= Battle of Kachkalyk =

1787 battle in Chechnya

- Part of the Sheikh Mansur Movement
Date	17 January 1787
Location	Kachkalyk, Chechnya
Result	Chechen victory; Heavy Russian casualties

Belligerents
Sheikh Mansur Movement	Russian Empire

Commanders and leaders
Ibba-Mullah †	(Russian Empire) Colonel Savalyev

Casualties and losses
20 killed 2,000 cattle captured	457 killed

The Battle of Kachkalyk, also known as the Battle of Ghachalq, was a surprise attack conducted by Chechen fighters of the Kachkalyks led by Ibba-Mullah, on a Russian army led by Colonel Savalyev on January 17, 1787.

== History ==
On January 17, 1787, the Russian Empire organized a large force under the command of Colonel Savalyev and launched a campaign into Chechnya. As the army climbed the heights of Kachkalyk, a historical region in Chechnya, fighters from the Kachkalyks, led by Ibba-Mullah, launched a surprise attack on the disorganized Russian army. The sudden ambush decimated Russian ranks, and after further fierce fighting, the mountaineer army left and retreated into the mountains. In the battle, up to 20 Chechens were killed, including Ibba-Mullah himself.

=== Russian punitive campaign ===
As a result, a second army, led by Colonel Rebinder, was mobilized and sent to Chechnya 2 days later, on January 19. The detachment was made up of a Grenadier Battalion. The detachment ravaged part of the Chechen plain and burnt down several villages, as a result of which about 80 people were killed and 4 people were captured, 800 rams and 30 heads of cattle were captured as booty, which were immediately distributed to the troops. Soon after the Russian soldiers returned to their garrisons.

== See also ==
- Battle of Tatartup
- Anapa campaign (1787)

== Sources ==
- Oztas, Ahmet (2013). A Page from the History of the North Caucasus: Imam Mansur Ushurma. EHESS. pp. 1–14.
- "Sheikh Mansur (Ushurma of Aldy)" (in Russian). 3 February 2020.
