= Battle of the Tokhtamysh River =

1790 battle at the Abazinka

- Part of Sheikh Mansur Movement and Russo-Turkish War (1787–1792)
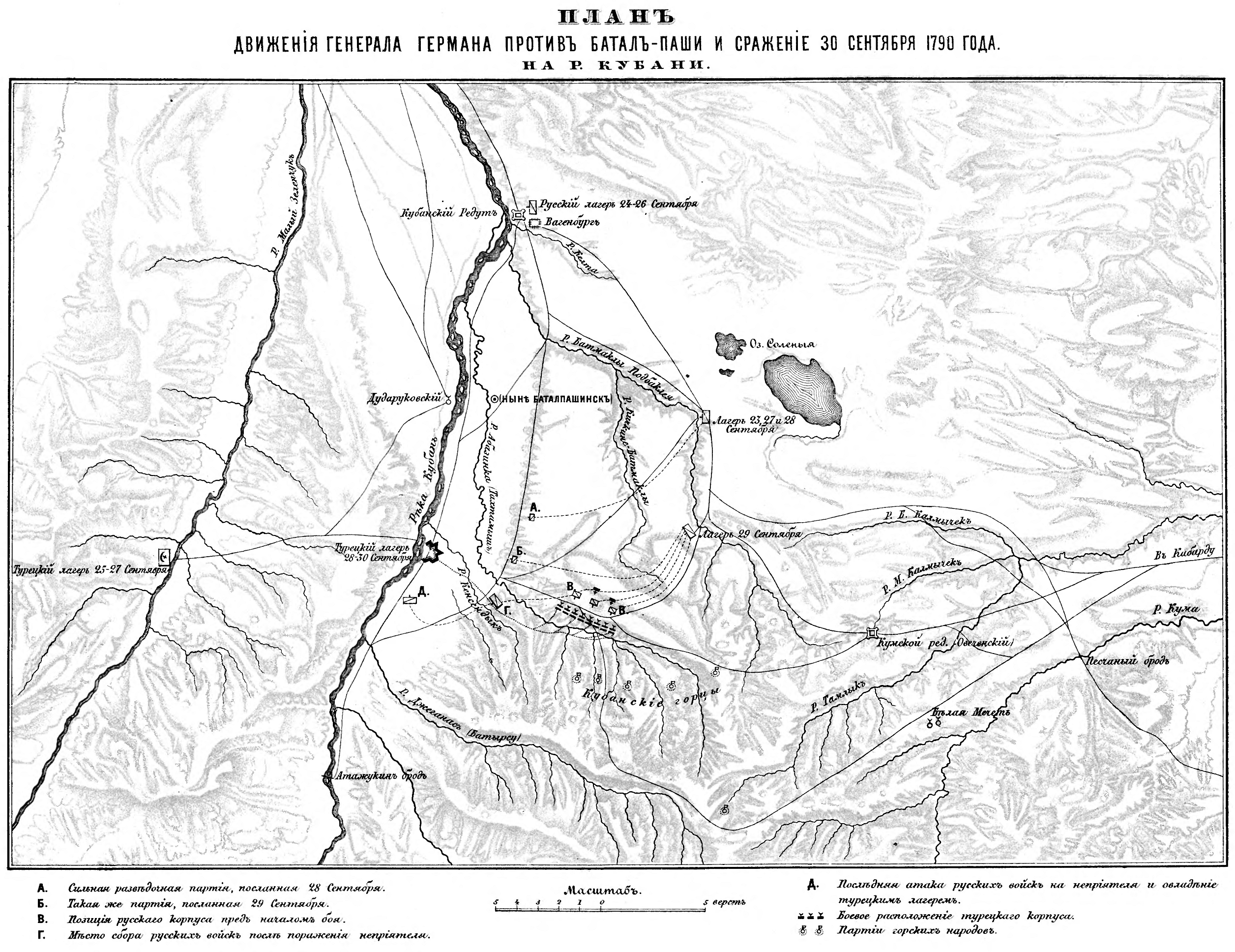
- Schematic of the battle
| Date | 30 September 1790 – 11 October 1790 |
| Location | Abazinka River (Tokhtamysh River) |
| Result | Russian victory |

Belligerents
| Ottoman Empire; Sheikh Mansur movement | Russian Empire |

Commanders and leaders
| Batal Hussein Pasha (POW); Aji Mustafa Pasha | (Russian Empire) Johann Hermann von Fersen (Russian Empire) Joseph Beerwitz (Russian Empire) Dimitry Orbeliani (Russian Empire) Colonel Butkevich (Russian Empire) Colonel Matzen (Russian Empire) Colonel Chemodanov (Russian Empire) Pavel Afrosimov (Russian Empire) Quartermaster General Städer |

Strength
| 25,000 Ottomans and mountaineers 30 cannons | 3,500–3,600 men 18 cannons |

Casualties and losses
| 1,000+ killed (per J. Hermann v. Fersen); 300+ died while fleeing (per QMG Städer); Hundreds drowned | 28 killed 115 wounded |

The Battle of the Tokhtamysh River, also known as the Battle of the Abazinka River, was a major battle between the Ottoman forces and the North Caucasians with a Russian army led by Johann Hermann von Fersen. The battle ended in a major Russian victory and forced the Ottomans and North Caucasians to flee. The main commander of the combined army, Batal Hussein Pasha, was captured, however, according to some sources, Batal surrendered himself without a fight to the Russians and betrayed his army.

== Prelude ==
On 20 September, General Johann Hermann von Fersen received the news that the army of Batal Pasha was advancing towards Kabardia, so, having gathered a detachment of 3,000 troops, he marched from the Kuma River to the Kuban River. On the 23rd, shots were heard from the mountaineers. Two days later, Batal Pasha arrived on the Bolshoy Zelenchuk, and on the 28th, he arrived on the Abazinka River (historically known as the Tokhtamysh River). The goal of Batal was to go to Kabardia, join forces with Kabardian fighters, and then attack the Russian fortress of Georgievskaya, while the goal of Hermann was to prevent the Batal's arrival in Kabardia at all costs.
Shortly after, Brigadier Beerwitz united with Hermann.

== Battle ==
On September 29, the Russian army, now counting 3,500 soldiers, approached the camp of Batal Pasha, located on the Abazinka River. Despite the fact that the Turkish forces were several times bigger, General Hermann decided to attack. On September 30 at 8 a.m., he divided his detachment into 5 columns and moved towards the camp. The vanguard of the Russian army, around 700 men strong, with 2 cannons and under the command of Major Prince Orbeliani was sent forth, with the task of occupying the heights of the river and Mount Podbakleya, and holding it until the arrival of the main army.
However, the mountaineer fighters noticed the advance of the vanguard and attacked it, but were forced to retreat after a fight, thus allowing Orbeliani to occupy the river heights.
Soon after, another column led by Brigadier Matzen and a detachment of rangers under Brigadier Beerwitz also advanced and occupied more of the river heights. He was soon attacked by a Turkish–Circassian detachment led by Aji Mustafa Pasha, and a fierce fight broke out. Strong cannon fire was also opened on both sides. In the battle, Pavel Afrosimov managed to destroy most of the Turkish Artillery battery on the right flank.

“The Turks, stretching their line over the Tokhtamys River, opened their batteries. Soon after their rapid artillery shots, Major Afrosimov hurried with his battery, and the infantry immediately joined me. ... The battle continued in all parts with various changes for about two hours; but nothing decisive could yet be applied; Meanwhile, artillery major Afrosimov managed to shoot down enemy batteries on their right flank; the fire was noticed less frequently and much weaker.” — Johann Hermann von Fersen

The attack was eventually repelled by Colonel Butkevich's cavalry detachment, and General Hermann gave the order to a column of rangers led by Brigadier Joseph Beerwitz to attack the left flank of the Turks, and Colonel Chemodanov's musketeer team to attack the right. However, Beerwitz encountered fierce Turkish–North Caucasian resistance, after which Colonel Mukhanov came to his aid. The combined army of Turks and North Caucasians were surprised by the detachment of Mukhanov, and thus were quickly overrun and forced to retreat back. Pursuing them, the Russians captured all of their artillery and eventually broke into Batal's camp. Following the Russian breakthrough and the complete defeat of the Turkish–Circassian left flank, the latter fled. Afterwards, from the left flank of the Russian army, Colonel Chemodanov's column approached the right flank, who, unable to withstand the Russian advance after the flight of the left flank, abandoned the battlefield, after which the Russian column captured all of their artillery.

Soon after, the Russian soldiers began celebrating, and the remaining Turkish and Circassian troops scattered and fled. There, the Russian troops stationed on the river heights began descending, and General Hermann himself gathered some troops to pursue them and began approaching their camp. 2 versts from the camp, a Circassian detachment attacked the advancing Russian soldiers, but they were eventually repelled by flankers, most notably the Rostov Carabiniers Regiment led by Captain Schreider, who was wounded during the clash. General Hermann sent a detachment of cavalry under Colonel Butkevich with infantry reinforcements to capture the camp.
Seeing his complete defeat, Batal Pasha and his Retinue went to meet Butkovich and surrendered to him.

== Aftermath ==
The result of the battle was a major Russian victory and completely overshowed Bibikov's severe defeat at the beginning of the year and prepared the way for a new campaign against Anapa.

While retreating, the defeated army was crushed again by the Kuban Army Corps under General Rozen.

=== Casualties ===
General Hermann reported that in the whole battle, 1 chief officer, 1 foreman and 26 lower ranks were killed, while 1 chief officer and 114 lower ranks were wounded. As for the Turkish–Circassian casualties, Hermann reports that on the battlefield up to the camp, 1,000 bodies were left behind, while several hundred people died while fleeing or by drowning in the Kuban River. The next day, a detachment under Chief Quartermaster Städer was sent to the Bolshoy Zelenchuk and reported that while on its way there, it saw another 300 bodies. Batal Pasha and an unknown number of troops were taken prisoner.

Hermann also reported that he captured more than 100 barrels of gunpowder, lead and various entrenching tools, as well as all of the enemies artillery.
