= Sheikh Mansur movement =

Eighteenth-century war

- Part of Caucasian War, Chechen–Russian conflict, Russo–Circassian War and 1787–1792 Russo–Turkish war
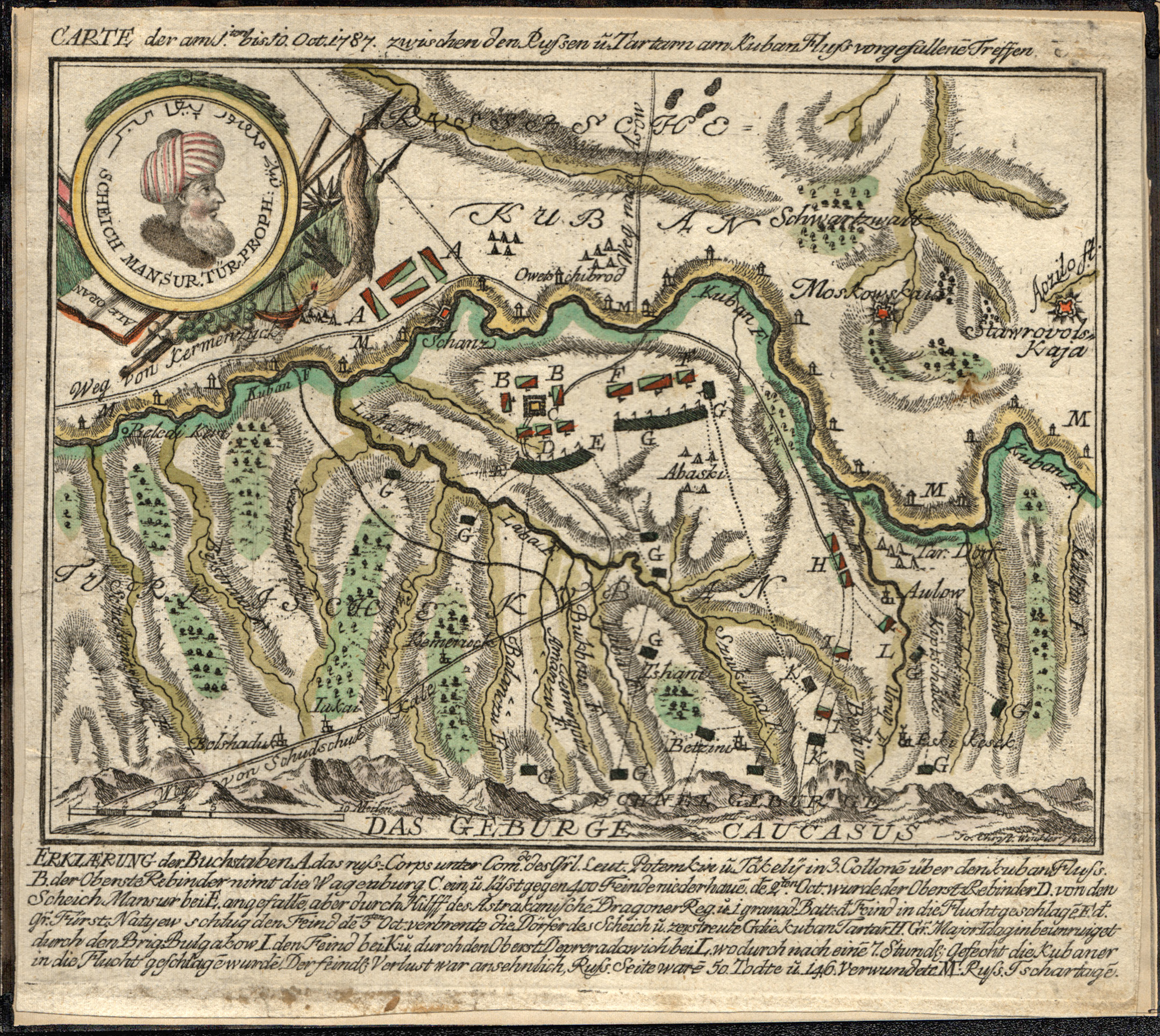
- Map of the Kuban River in October 1787 with Sheikh Mansur at the top left
| Date | 6 July 1785 – 22 June 1791 (5 years, 11 months, 2 weeks, 2 days) |
| Location | North Caucasus and Russian Empire |
| Result | Russian victory |

Belligerents
| First North Caucasian Imamate; Including: Chechnya; (1785–1787); Kabardians; (1785–1786); Circassia; (1787–1791); Kumyks; (1785–1787); Lezgins; (1785–1787); Other North Caucasians; Supported by: Ottoman Empire; (1787–1791) | Russian Empire; Including: Cossacks; Kumyk Khanates; Other North Caucasian loyalists |

Commanders and leaders
| Sheikh Mansur (WIA) (POW); Omar–Hadji (WIA); Osman–Hajji (WIA); Prince Alkhan †; Prince Atkhan †; Dol Mudarov (POW); Berd Khaptsug; Hadji Pasha; Ali Mustafa Pasha; Kose Pasha; Hussein Pasha; Tatal-Bey; Aji Mustafa Pasha; Batal Pasha (POW); Mustafa-Paşa (POW) | (Russian Empire) Catherine II; (Russian Empire) Grigory Potemkin; (Russian Empire) Pavel Potemkin; (Russian Empire) Peter Tekeli; (Russian Empire) Ivan Saltykov; (Russian Empire) Johann Fersen; (Russian Empire) Anton de Balmen; (Russian Empire) Ivan Gudovich; (Russian Empire) Pyotr Bagration (POW); (Russian Empire) Fyodor Apraksin; (Russian Empire) Ivan Zagryazhsky; (Russian Empire) Sergey Bulgakov; (Russian Empire) Anton Schitz; (Russian Empire) Ivan Depreradovich; (Russian Empire) Wrede Leontiev; (Russian Empire) Maxim Rebinder; (Russian Empire) Yuri Bibikov; (Russian Empire) Vasily Tomara; (Russian Empire) Ivan Veshnyakov; (Russian Empire) Bekovich Cherkassky; (Russian Empire) Ivan Lunin; (Russian Empire) Peter Sekhin; (Russian Empire) Ivan Kazin (WIA); (Russian Empire) Nikolai de Pieri †; (Russian Empire) Sergei Komarsky † |

Strength
| Northeast Caucasians: 29,000 (Note: According to Pavel Potemkin: "The Kumyks alone, together with other mountain peoples, the number of which cannot be determined, could easily field up to 5,000 men; The Aksaevites, together with the Toplin and Andreevsky and other Lezgin peoples, could gather up to 2,000 men, the Chechens (only lowland Chechnya) – up to 4,000 men, the Kabardians – up to 8,000 men, except for Lesser Kabarda, now scattered in different places, but with the addition of the latter, the total number could increase to 10,000." "Thus, the number of mountain militias (excluding the Northwestern Caucasians) could reach up to 29,000 men."); 10,000 Circassians and Nogais; 40,000 | (Russian Empire) 27,000–35,000 |

Casualties and losses
| Total: 18,645; +7,344 killed; 4,301 wounded; 7,000 captured; 95 cannons captured or destroyed | Total: 16,805; 9,494 killed; 6,809 wounded; 480 captured; 22 cannons captured or destroyed |

The Sheikh Mansur movement, (Note: Russian: Движение шейха Мансура) was a major war between the Russian Empire and the North Caucasians, caused by the Chechen religious and military leader Sheikh Mansur, who opposed the Russian expansionist policies and wanted to unite the North Caucasians under a single Islamic state.

Starting off as a failed Russian campaign to capture Sheikh Mansur, who had spread Islam among the Chechens, it quickly turned to a region-wide anti-Russian insurgency. Although victorious at first, brutal Russian tactics, among them burning and destruction of villages as well as repeating military losses of the mountaineers, led to the decline of the insurgency, which saw Mansur lose many of his supporters. He left for Circassia in July 1787, where he suffered his final defeat during the siege of Anapa of 1791. Regardless, he is honored as a national hero among the Chechens and Circassians in the current day.

== Territory ==
At the height of his power, the authority of Sheikh Mansur encompassed the entire North Caucasus from Dagestan to Circassia

== Background ==
=== Sheikh Mansur ===
Uscherman (Note: Mansur's birth name; Russian documents mention him as Ushurma) was born around the year 1760 to a poor family in Aldy (modern–day Grozny). He spent most of his life shepherding and herding live stock until travelling to Dagestan around the year 1778 to study Islam.

In 1784, he declared himself an Imam and in February of 1785 he held his first public ceremonies. He called on the Chechens to abandon their old pagan traditions and observe the laws of Islam. He quickly grew a following, and soon most of Aldy began accepting Islam.

== First Phase (July – December 1785) ==
=== Aldy Expedition ===
Between April and June of 1785, the Russian Empire began preparing for a campaign against the rebellious Chechens and to capture Sheikh Mansur. In early July, a 3,000 strong Russian detachment led by the Russian officer Nikolai de Pieri was sent to Aldy and Alkhan–Yurt. The detachment arrived at Aldy on July 7 and entered the village, only to find it almost empty. The Russian army burnt the village down and began retreating, although without having captured Sheikh Mansur.
In the forest near the village, several hundred Chechen fighters led by Mansur himself surrounded the Russian detachment and dispersed it through the woods, killing 745 soldiers (5 officers, 740 soldiers) and capturing another 162 (8 officers, 154 soldiers) as well as two cannons. Thus, the detachment was defeated and Pieri himself was killed. According to Mansur, during interrogations, only around 100 Chechen fighters died.
As a result, Mansur rose in popularity across the North Caucasus, and several thousand fighters from across the region came to join his army, allowing him to conduct military operations only days after the battle. On the 8th of the same month, another Russian detachment led by Fyodor Apraksin attacked the Chechen village Alkhan–Yurt, defeated its defenders and destroyed the village during the Battle of Alkhan–Yurt. This did not change the mood of the rebels however, who kept joining Mansur's camp.

=== First campaign against Kizlyar ===
Mansur held a speech to all of his followers, urging them to attack Russian fortifications and fight Russian expansion. He himself announced that he would attack Kizlyar soon.

==== Attack on Karginsk ====
A few days after the Battle of Aldy, on July 14, the rebels, counting more than 5,000, attacked the Karginsk redoubt. They started a fire, which soon spread to the powder magazine, as a result of which the entire redoubt, along with most of its defenders, blew up. Mansur's forces stormed the redoubt and captured the remaining defenders, as well as four cannons. This was the first victory of Mansur outside Chechnya.

==== Siege of Kizlyar ====
On July 15, the rebels began their siege of Kizlyar. In total, they launched 5 attacks on the fortress, but each one was repelled. Towards the end of the day, they retreated to their camps.

Early next day, the Russian command sent the Tomsk infantry regiment to attack the rebel camp and push them away from Kizlyar. The regiment however suffered heavy casualties and was forced to retreat back to the fortress, ending the first siege of Kizlyar in no deciding victory for either side.

Mansur held a speech afterwards, in which he complimented his army on the capture of the Karginsk redoubt and the defeat of the Tomsk regiment, but also motivated them to keep fighting. His speech worked, and almost non of the rebels perceived the retreat from Kizlyar as a defeat. In general, wealthy and powerful nobles and princes of the North Caucasus refused to join Mansur, while many of the peasants and civilians did, as the former feared Russian punitive campaigns against them or losing their power. There were notable exceptions however, such as Akhmet Dudarov from Ossetia or several of the sons of the rulers of the Kumyk Khanates.

As rumors about a second campaign against Kizlyar began to spread, the Russian command undertook several defensive operations and began reinforcing Kizlyar. The Astrakhan infantry regiment as well as a 2,000 strong Kalmyk detachment were sent to the fortress.

=== Grigoriopolis campaign ===
The Kabardian princes sent an invitation to Sheikh Mansur, which, according to the report Major Zhiltsov, Mansur accepted, and he travelled to Kabardia on July 26. Immediately, Russian commanders sent reinforcements to the Grigoriopolis redoubt, and also sent a detachment led by Brigadier Fyodor Apraksin to the Malka River to prevent Mansur from meeting the Kabardians. Mansur managed to meet the princes of Lesser Kabardia, with whom he planned future attacks and campaigns. He also convinced the princes Dol Mudarov and Berd Khaptsug to join him and attack Grigoriopolis.

On July 29, the rebel army arrived at Grigoriopolis and encircled it. They tried entering the fortress, but failed. With their experience from the Attack on Karginsk, the rebels began burning down houses, stables and other buildings around the fortress and tried to climb the walls again. This attack was repelled with heavy losses.
After a day, 180 Russian soldiers stormed out of the fortress and conducted a surprise attack on the mountaineers, who were caught off guard and forced to retreat, ending the Battle of Grigoriopolis.

=== Minor Military operations ===
In August of 1785, Mansur announced that the second attack on Kizlyar would soon start. However, many highlanders opposed this choice. The Kachkalikov clan (Ghachalkkhoy clan) (Note: Chechen: Гӏачалкхой, romanized: Ghachalkkhoy; Extinct Chechen clan which inhabited the Kachkalikov ridge) Chechens and other Chechen clans invited Mansur to discuss future operations. At the council, they declared that they agreed to jointly oppose Russia, but not against Kizlyar, but against the numerous settlements between the Shelkozavodskaya and Shchedrinskaya Cossack villages. They did not hope for luck near Kizlyar and believed that for a start it would be better to capture the weakly defended villages, steal herds of horses and capture people. Mansur agreed, but he did not want to abandon his plans for campaigns against Kizlyar, Vladikavkaz and others because he believed that only such major operations would decide the outcome of the war. Soon after, the highlanders began attacking military settlements on the Terek River.

The next day, 400 rebels attacked the Kalinovka village, but were repelled by the Cossacks who were warned and had prepared. The same day, 200 rebels conducted several successful raids on soldiers' settlements near Vladikavkaz, during which they captured 800 heads of cattle and 50 people. Several other successful raids found success as well.

The recent successes also motivated the Circassians, and they began picking up arms against the Russian forces. Around 1,800 Circassian fighters gathered at the Kuban River, ready to attack the Russian fortifications.

The troops and settlers were forced to live without letting go of their weapons. Not a single trade caravan, not a single transport with goods and weapons, not a single delegation could set off without a large military convoy. In fact, the troops, Cossacks and settlers were locked up in the walls of their settlements. Mansur's plan was to drive them back to Russia and prevent them from seizing the lands of the Chechens and other Caucasian peoples.

On August 4, a detachment of Kabardians attacked a Russian army (~2,000 strong) on the Malka River, but was repelled. The Kabardians suffered 24 losses. In September, 1,000 rebels marched on Naurskaya, while another detachment attacked Mozdok. The Kabardians also constantly invaded the Russian borders, stole cattle and took people into captivity. In the autumn of 1785, the rebellious Kabardians made their way across the line to the Kura River, plundered the Cherkesskaya village and took all the inhabitants with them. The example of the rebellious Chechens and Kabardins was followed by the peoples beyond the Kuban. The Russian troops, which consisted mainly of infantry, could not successfully counteract the detachments of cavalry, who made quick and unexpected movements. Dispersed along the entire border in small detachments, they could not concentrate in time to deliver a strong blow. The cavalry regiments on the Caucasian line were in a particularly bad state. They were not manned; there was also a great shortage of horses.

Among the captives of the rebel army was a Georgian named Peter, and in a letter he sent to the commander of Kizlyar, he stated: "I swear to God they have 20,000 cavalry and 15,000 infantry, and their will to march on Kizlyar in 2 weeks is strong!" Although the information given by Peter about the size of the army of the highlanders is strongly exaggerated, it is known that a large number of fighters gathered under the banner of Mansur—Greater than the army during the First siege of Kizlyar. General Potemkin began to act. In addition to measures of military intimidation, he continued to send out letters and proclamations, trying to win over either the peasants or the rulers. However, these attempts had no serious effect. "Many reports assure me," the Kizlyar commandant Veshnyakov wrote to the Kostek ruler Khamza Alishev, "that the highlanders are going to march into the Russian borders, and their path will certainly pass through the Kumyk villages. Being loyal to the Russian side, you should forbid the highlanders from passing through their villages, and dismantle the ferry across the Koisu River so that they cannot use it."

In the late autumn of 1785, the entire Russian border from the Black Sea to the Caspian Sea was on fire, subjected to constant attacks by local peoples. General Potemkin was forced to reorganize the line's defenses. Of all the available troops, he made three large detachments. One was supposed to hold back the Kumyks, Dagestanis and Chechens, the other — the Kabardians, the third — the Circassians.

Until then, not using military means to prevent the attacks of the mountaineers, Potemkin again sent out proclamations to the peoples who were on the side of Mansur. From some places he got answers. In a letter dated October 12, 1785, in the Tatar (Kumyk) language, residents and foremen of the villages of Bolshie Atagi, Chechen-Aul and Aldy reported that the imam living with them had no hostile intentions towards the Russians. Sheikh Mansur only glorifies the Muslim religion, demands strict observance of the law, and executes thieves without mercy. At the same time, the foremen frankly admitted that without the permission of the imam they could not and did not dare to enter into negotiations with the authorities. "We are in strict obedience to Imam Mansur," the Chechen elders wrote, "we do whatever he orders. He is a person honored and chosen by God, kind and just, and does not order to offend Christians and other lawless people, but calls to observe the Muslim law. He does not want the side of your loss. Therefore, now, whatever he commands, we will do it."

=== Second campaign against Kizlyar ===
Mansur launched a second campaign against Kizlyar and arrived at the fortress on August 19, 1785. His army counted between 10,000 and 12,000 men, while the Russian side assembled 2,500 soldiers and an unknown number of civilian fighters. The mountaineers launched several attacks on the fortress, but all were repelled by the Russian cannon fire.

On August 21, the rebels attacked the Tomsk infantry regiment, consisting of 720 soldiers, which was stationed outside the fortress. Both sides suffered heavy casualties, but it was the Tomsk regiment which retreated first. The forces of Mansur pursued the retreating soldiers, but their advance was eventually halted by Russian cannon fire. On August 22, the army of Mansur split into three parts and began retreating. Mansur himself retreated to Kabardia.

=== Aftermath of the Siege of Kizlyar and further raids ===
The result of the second siege of Kizlyar was heavy on Mansur and saw him lose support from many of his supporters. Despite that, the situation still remained tense: In the same month, Kabardian fighters attacked the detachment of Major General Shemyakin, stationed at the tops of the Malki River near the Beshtovy Mountains. They repeatedly invaded the border line with large forces, carrying out robberies and raids. At the same time, the Circassians invaded the Line and attempted to take possession of the Prochnokop fortress. Between September and December, a 20,000 strong Dagestani army led by Umma Khan V and some of Mansur's companions invaded Georgia and devastated the region Imereti.

Mansur decided to go on a campaign in the Aksai principality, which he would force to join him. The Aksai people generally supported him: "If the imam starts moving towards Kizlyar again," Kilyakaev reported, "the Andreevites will stick to him. Now he has the intention, having left the dwelling, to take the first camp on the Yaryk-su River, where he will force the owners of Aksaev to join him, and then move on to the Kazma tract. At present, the army gathered by Mansur is not yet in large numbers." In a letter from the Andreevsky owner Temir Khamzin to foreman Veshnyakov, it was reported that the rulers of Ali-Soltan Kambulatov, Chepalov, Adzhimurtaza-liyev with their bridles and subject peasants still remain on the side of Mansur and "do not agree to leave their malicious intentions... The princes Aksaevsky between they agreed on an oath that they would not interfere in the crowd of the Aldy Shih and did not obey his orders."

In early September 1785, Mansur, being in the village of Goryachevskoye, subject to the Aksaev princes, began to assure its inhabitants that he was waiting for the arrival of Chechen detachments and after that he would go again to Kizlyar or to the Kalinovskaya village. "The Kumyks ask me to go to Kizlyar," said the imam, "and the Chechens want to attack the Kalinovskaya village. After the council, we will decide where to go." However, the meeting never took place. Without waiting for the arrival of the Chechen detachments, Mansur went to the Yaryk-su River and hoisted his banner here. With him arrived up to 500 troops, several Kabardian rulers and Kumyk princes. The food was soon used up, after which most of the highlanders were forced to go home.

Through his letters and speeches, Mansur once again managed to motivate the North Caucasians in picking up arms against the Russian administration. The movement was joined by the Ingush and Ossetians in September. On September 17, Ingush and Ossetian fighters gathered near Vladikavkaz and began attacking Russian fortifications. In response, the Russian command sent forces under Captain Pakhomov. In the same month on the 30th, Lieutenant Colonel Matzen noted that "the Ingush and Ossetians, after the movement of the mountaineers to Kizlyar, became agitated and, forgetting the oath, began to attack their rulers and Russian posts both on the plains and in the mountains."

During this time, a rumor spread that the Ottoman Empire would join the war on the side of the mountaineers. This motivated the Circassians, who began conducting more and better coordinated attacks on Russian fortifications. On October 1, Circassian fighters attacked a fortified Russian redoubt. The next day, October 2, a Circassian force, numbering 300 fighters, crossed the Kuban River and attacked a Russian redoubt. The same day, another Circassian detachment attacked the Kuban redoubt. On October 4, by order of Mansur, 400 rebels attacked the Kalinovka village, but were met with heavy cannon fire while trying to cross the Terek River and were forced to return. On October 10, 2,000 Circassians tried breaking through the North Caucasus Line to Stavropol, but were repelled on the Kuban River. The same day, up to 1,000 Circassians attacked Russian fortifications, as a result of which both sides suffered heavy casualties. Around the same time, 400 Kabardian fighters conducted a successful raid on the Nino village and captured around 500 horses and 800 sheep. Another detachment made its way to the Konstantinogorsk fortress and destroyed several military settlements and captured 31 people.

=== Decline of the insurgency ===
==== Campaign to Kabardia ====
On October 12, Mansur and his forces moved to Aksai, where they prepared to cross the Terek River. Not far from there was a Russian detachment led by Colonel Savelyev. The detachment consisted of a battalion of grenadiers, two musketeer companies and Cossacks from the villages located along the Terek. When he found out about the advance of Mansur, he took a part of the detachment with him to stop the rebels from crossing. Watching from the edge of a dense forest, Savelyev opened cannon fire on the crossing rebels. Heavy cannon and rifle fire forced the rebels to retreat, who moved upstream the Terek and then disappeared behind a dense forest.

Mansur moved with his detachment to the town Braguny and he himself returned to Aldy (village) to convince Chechen fighters to join him. The meeting was successful. On October 22, Mansur, with his army that now counted around 6,000 fighters, made his way to Kabardia, where he planned to unite with the Kabardians and act together. He was constantly followed by Colonel Savelyev and also Ivan Lunin, who had just arrived. Eventually, Larion Nagel was also involved, as Potemkin believed that this could be the chance to end the movement of Mansur completely. Nagel was tasked with preventing Mansur from uniting with the Kabardians.

Potemkin himself, with an army of 5,000, moved towards the Beshtov Mountains (Beshtau) and settled down on the Malka River, intending to take part in the operation at the final stage. There, Potemkin sent a letter to the Kabardian princes in which he called on them to not join Mansur. However, this letter differed from other Russian letters to the North Caucasian princes, as this proclamation did not involve politics nor military, but rather, religion.

"God is omnipotent, wise and infinite. He created the heavens, the world and the inevitable flow of nature. For the good of man, by the power of his spirit, he appointed legislators, of whom the first was Moses, then Jesus Christ and, finally, all of Asia honors Muhammad as the third chosen prophet of God. The Koran says that after these three lawmakers there will be no more prophecy. Where did Imam Mansur come from? Why do people blindly believe him, not knowing either the law or the scriptures of the Koran? The deceiver, taking advantage of the blindness of people, promises them miracles, but has he even done a single thing? He encouraged the peoples to shed a great sound to all ends of the Universe — who heard this sound? He promised to release a voice from heaven in order to blind and deafen those of other faiths — who heard this heavenly voice, who saw Russian soldiers deaf and blinded?
Now, having returned to the line, I want to use the weapon entrusted to me to punish daring criminals. Clergy, be sure that I will not touch their law; people, be sure that I will leave all the faithful alone and accept them under the protection of the imperial arms; I will persecute, defeat and punish criminals until they come with repentance to ask for mercy."

The Kabardian response to the letter was mixed, although some princes did go over to the Russian side. Mansur failed to unite with the Kabardians due to the lack of food, so he wanted to go to Chervlenaya. There, they were shot at by the troops of Colonel Lunin, which prevented them from taking the village.

After a few days, Mansur decided to go to Kabardia to restock on food. However, the forces of Larion Nagel were waiting for him there.

===== Battle of the Malka =====
On October 30, the mountaineers surrounded Nagel by occupying gorges and the forest. They then feinted a retreat, with the plan of luring the Russian detachment into the dense forest, were the Caucasian highlanders were superior. However, this did not work. Then, the forces of Mansur went into attack, but were repelled. The battle ended in no deciding victory for either side.

===== Battle of Tatartup =====
On November 2 at 7 a.m., Mansur launched a strong attack on several sides on Nagel's forces near Tatartup. Nevertheless, the tide of the battle was going over to the Russian side. Seeing this, Mansur launched a battle cry to the fighting Chechens and Kumyks and he himself rode into battle against the Russians. His fighters attacked the Russian troops and a fierce battle broke out, in which both sides suffered heavy casualties. Movable shields on wheels were also invented by Mansur's fighters during the battle, which served as a protection from Russian artillery. The Russian troops began retreating and Nagel went to Mozdok for reinforcements. Mansur took the opportunity and instantly retreated to Kabardia.

==== Aftermath and the decline of the insurgency ====
Upon returning to Aldy, according to P. G. Butkov, "he was received by his compatriots without the enthusiasm that they had for him before." Aldy elders feared Russian punitive campaigns and didn't believe that Mansur would be able to protect him. Unrest began not only in his native village, but throughout the entire camp of Mansur's supporters. Throughout December 1785, the Russian Empire received several letters from North Caucasian communities, promising them no harm in the future. Among those was also Aldy and Atagi.

Potemkin began noticing the change of the mood of the rebels. He declared that if the rebels don't surrender, he will "bring the thunder of arms and a sharp sword to defeat the criminals." He also promised 300 rubles to anyone who captured Mansur and brought him alive to the Russians, and 500 rubles for those who "bring his head". Now Mansur was also at risk of being betrayed by his companions.

At the end of 1785, Russian troops arrived near the Baksan river, ready to cross it to Kabardia. It was there where the Kabardian princes held a meeting in which it was decided to surrender to Russia. Most of the princes surrendered, except for Dol Mudarov. The situation began to worsen for Mansur, and he was forced to leave his native village and went to Shali, where he moved to the brother of his wife. He continued to send letters to the tribes of the North Caucasus and to his fellow villagers of Aldy, in which he hoped for his support and declared: "All our troubles are the wrath of God, the Lord's punishment for the weakening of faith, mutual disagreements and failure to fulfill the instructions of the Prophet. Purify yourself, become faithful warriors of Allah, and victories will certainly come!"

== Second Phase (January 1786 – June 1787) ==
=== Revival of the movement ===
Mansur's letters had effect. Soon, rumors about his miracles began spreading, such as that Mansur could appear where ever he wished and disappear whenever he wanted, a story about Mansur's ride on a magic horse to the Azov sea, or that he could heal the sick just by laying his hands on them. By January 1786, the entire Caucasus was engulfed in uprisings. The Ottoman Empire also seemed to be interested in the movement of the North Caucasians.

Mansur spent most of 1786 in reviving the movement and urging and encouraging the North Caucasians to pick up arms against the Russian Empire, raid the North Caucasus Line as well as Russian and Cossack fortifications. According to General Shemyakin, Mansur, with a detachment of 80 fighters, appeared in Chechen villages and made "demands from the Chechens three people from each mosque and twenty kopecks from the yard for their maintenance." He also notes that the people still had great respect for the Sheikh.
Mansur continued mobilization and eventually travelled to Endirey, where many people joined his army. Soon, many Kumyks and also Karabulaks joined the rebel camp. Mansur's plan was to later go to Kabardia and join forces with the Circassians, after which they would attack the Caucasus line.
The letters of Mansur to North Caucasian princes were successful and several nobles joined him, such as Ali-Soltan Chepalov and Murtazali Chepalov. Umma Khan V also began showing interest. The Russian Empire sent an appeal to the princes who joined Masur, calling on them to leave him, however, the appeal of the Russian command to the mountaineers had no effect. Chechens and Kabardians, together with Trans-Kubans, continued to carry out attacks on military patrols, pickets and fortifications of Russian troops on the Caucasian line. General Shemyakin reported that a detachment of 100 Chechens crossed the Terek River and attacked the military guard of the Tomsk regiment not far from the Nizhny Yar tract. On the same day, Prime Major Prince Urakov, a Kabardian officer, was captured by the Chechens. He was later ransomed from them by the Russians for 500 rubles.
Although the Ingush weren't supporters of Mansur, after letters sent to them by the Sheikh they were ready to give Amanats and act against the Russian Empire together with the Chechens and Kabardians.

After the Russian administration realized that they couldn't capture Mansur, they tried discrediting him. They wrote a letter, which was apparently supposed to go to Mansur, but "accidentally" got into the hands of Armenian merchants, who spread its content to the North Caucasus. The letter portrayed Mansur as a secret ally of Russia and was written by Major Ivan Abramov. However it wasn't long before the North Caucasians realized the deception and thus the letter had little to no effect on Mansur's status among the mountaineers.

=== Invasion of Kabardia, capture of Dol Mudarov and effects ===
At the end of July, 1786, around 4,000 Russian troops and 4 cannons under the command of Larion Nagel were sent to Kabardia to prevent the Ingush from joining Mansur and also to capture Dol Mudarov, one of Mansur's closest companions. The campaign of Nagel in Kabardia was completely unexpected by the people. Mudarov managed to gather an army, but after realizing the several times larger Russian army, he and his forces retreated into the mountains.
Nagel began stealing the cattle of the Kabardians, but refused to burn Kabardian villages in hopes of Mudarov's surrender. If the Russian army managed to capture all of their cattle and burn their fields, the Kabardian fighters would starve to death, which eventually forced Mudarov to leave the mountains and surrender. He was later released under the condition that he would not rebel against the Russian Empire again.
The capture of Dol Mudarov was a heavy blow to Mansur. Not only did one he lose one of his closest companions, but Mudarov's surrender caused other North Caucasian princes to go over to the Russian side in fear of being invaded. Chepalov Hadji Murtazaliev, also one of Mansur's closest associates, also left him. Umma Khan V, who had previously promised Mansur that he would join him and bring with him a large army, also realized that he would not benefit from an alliance with the Sheikh. The Kumyk peoples and princes of Endirey and Aksai held a meeting and decided that they would not join Mansur. For the remainder of the year, Mansur continued mobilizing the North Caucasian peoples.

=== Battle of Kachkalikov and Russian response ===
A Russian army was organized to punish the rebellious Kachkalikov clan. On January 17, 1787, while passing through the Kachkalikov ridge, a mountainous area, they were ambushed by Chechen fighters, who inflicted heavy casualties on them, after which the Chechens retreated behind the mountains.
In response, a second army was mobilized on January 19, who invaded Chechnya and burnt down several villages, after which they returned to their garrisons.

=== Karabulak campaign ===
By holding religious sermons and speeches, Mansur motivated people to join his army, promising them the capture of Vladikavkaz. According to Major Elagin, Mansur's plan was to invade the Karabulaks (known as Orstkhoy in Chechen and Ingush) who, according to Mansur, did not live in accordance to the teachings of Muhammad, so he would resort to force to punish them.
With a force of around 1,000 fighters, Mansur invaded the land of the Karabulaks in mid–June 1787 and his campaign ended within a week.
Mansur managed to occupy some Karabulak villages despite meeting fierce resistance from the locals. The Karabulaks then called for Russian help, and after the arrival of Russian troops, Mansur's small militia was forced to retreat.

== Third Phase (July 1787 – June 1791) ==
=== Mansur leaves for Circassia ===
On July 5, Mansur left Chechnya and was already beyond the Kuban River. On July 11, in a report to Prince Grigory Potemkin, it was reported that Mansur was beyond the Kuban, and that the Circassians had already pleaged alliagance to him.

Later that year, the Russian administration received several reports that the Circassians planned to carry out attacks on the Caucasus line, and that Mansur "movitates them to do so". In response, in a short time, 13 more fortified redoubts were erected on the North Caucasus Line. The Russian forces in the Caucasus were reformed, prepared and equipped in case of Circassian attacks.
According to the reports of Colonel Nagel, Mansur's influence in Circassia was great, and due to his speeches and cermons, the Circassians conducted more raids on the Caucasus line.

=== Anapa campaign of 1787 and start of the Russo-Turkish War of 1787–1792 ===
On August 21, the Russian Empire declared war on the Ottoman Empire. During that time, Mansur prepared his Circassian and organized a large–scale invasion of Russia.
Potemkin soon found out about Mansur's plan and sent a force of 8,000 soldiers and 35 cannons, led by Colonel Maxim Rebinder. The goal of the campaign was the final defeat of Mansur. He himself managed to gather a combined army of Circassians, Nogais and Chechens, counting between 7,000 to 8,000.

On September 20, Russian forces led by Colonel Rebinder arrived on the Zelenchuk River and planned to conduct a surprise attack on Mansur's forces, who was only 20 miles away. However, upon arriving at the location, Mansur was not there, but instead, a Circassian army camp defended by a fence of 600 carts. The Russian forces attacked the camp but the Circassians defending it put up fierce resistance, repelling several Russian attacks, while also suffering heavy casualties themselves to artillery fire. The biggest Russian casualty was the death of the Cossack chieftain Yanov. The next day, on September 21, the Russian forces captured the camp.

==== Battle of the Urup River ====
The same day, Mansur's forces conducted a surprise attack on the Russian army and inflicted heavy casualties on them, pushing the Russians back and even dispersing 2 squadrons and part of the Cossacks. The entire detachment found itself in a difficult situation, but soon reinforcements arrived and Rebinder launched a counterattack. Mansur retreated back to his army camp and was reinforced by 3,000 fighters from several Circassian tribes, Kipchak Turks and Abazins. On the 22nd, Mansur's forces attacked again, but were repelled and began retreating. He was pursued by Rebinder, but Rebinder was eventually forced to stop his advance due to heavy casualties. Rebinder went to the upper reaches of Bolshoi Zelenchuk, burnt down the house in which Mansur had settled, as well as several local villages.

==== Aftermath and end of the campaign ====
On September 25, Mansur, leading a detachment of 300 to 400 fighters, ambushed the Russian army and almost crushed its rearguard, despite the mountaineers being poorly equipped, with many not even having fire arms, but instead bows and arrows. After a 2 hour long battle, Mansur retreated.

On the same day, General Ratiev received the order to withdraw from Circassia due to the heavy losses that the Russian army suffered during the campaign. Up to 200 people were killed, and several times more wounded.

=== Campaign in October ===
With the onset of autumn, Pavel Potemkin sent General Peter Tekelli and Ataman Ilovaisky on a new campaign to Circassia, with the goal of "defeating the adjacent peoples where the rebellious Shih Mansur had his stay". The detachment of Tekelli counted 12,750 soldiers. Taking with them a month's supply of food, the force crossed the Kuban river on October 14. For several days, Tekelli moved up the Zelenchuk River, but didn't encounter Mansur anywhere.
The Circassians inhabiting the Kuban river left their homes and moved into the mountains and settled in inaccessiable gorges. However, the detachments of Colonel Rebinder and Ratiev approached them and in a fierce battle on October 18, the Russian forces defeated the Abazins, who suffered heavy casualties and were forced to retreat to the mountains as well. During that time, General Tekelli received the information that Mansur had gathered a large army and was located between the Zelenchuk and Kafar Rivers.

==== Battle of the Kafar River ====
Tekelli sent Rebinder to the upper reaches of the Zelenchuk, he himself went to the Kafar River, where, on the 19th of October, he met the 5,000 strong army of Sheikh Mansur. Mansur's army was poorly equipped, with daggers, sabers and outdated flintlock guns. In the battle that ensued, Mansur's fighters were defeated and forced to retreat to the Urup River.

==== October 1787 Battle of the Urup River ====
The next day, Tekelli was informed that Mansur's fighters had settled in the gorges of the Urup River, so he sent a detachment under General Ratiev to the river, while he himself went to the upper reaches of the Urup.
The Russian forces approached the river and the mountaineers were now unable to flee, as they were trapped in the gorge. Mansur's forces suffered heavy casualties and it seemed that he himself would be captured or killed. With his commanders, he travelled through the snowy mountains, through which even the locals didn't know any routes. He eventually reached the Turkish fortress Sudzhuk–Kale, modern–day Novorossiysk.
Disappointed by the result of the campaign, Tekelli ordered his commanders to burn down the villages of the Besleney and Temirguy tribes.
As a result of the whole campaign, over 300 Circassian villages were destroyed and the Russian forces failed to capture Mansur, who soon later rebuilt his army.

==== Aftermath ====
Brigadier Gorich Bolshoy was given instructions, together with Tekelli's expedition and the Kabardian rulers, to launch an attack on the rebel Trans-Kubans. Having gathered a detachment of five thousand people, the Kabardian rulers attacked the Abazas, Bashilbays and Temirgoys, took the amanats from them and obliged them to be loyal to Russia. However, the mountain peoples were not afraid, but, on the contrary, irritated by the cruelty of punitive actions, continued to attack Russian fortifications. Often the Kabardians themselves joined Mansur's troops and were their best guides.

General Tekelli reported that the Circassians did not lose hope in Mansur despite the heavy defeat. He went on to found the "Kabardian militia", made up of around 900 Kabardian cavalry from across Kabardia, however the militia proved to be inaffective and Circassian militias kept raiding the Caucasus line.

The remainder of the year was used by Russian troops to prepare their forces for the war against the Ottoman Empire.

=== New uprisings among the North East Caucasians ===
On January 1, 1788, Tekelli reported to St. Petersburg that Mansur sent a letter to the Chechens, in which he stated that he had gathered up to 15,000 men and several artillery and will return to Chechnya. But until then, he ordered them to constantly carry out attacks on the Russian border. And the Chechens, General Tekelli noted, "supported by assurances from the shikha, gathering in large detachments, they carry out attacks everywhere."

On January 4, Chechen detachments from the villages of Shali, Germenchuk and Goryachev attacked the Novogladkovskaya state post office along the Kizlyar road and captured the sergeant of the Kizlyar garrison battalion Osipov and seven Greben Cossacks. "Inflamed by Mansur's letters," Tekelli reported, "the Chechens are increasingly disobeying their rulers and elders and launching attacks on the Russian borders."
On January 16, 600 Chechen fighters crossed the Terek and attacked a plantation located forty miles from the village of Chervlenaya. Shortly before, the detachment passed through villages owned by the Aksai Kumyk princes, who were loyal to the Russian Empire, however the princes did not inform the Russian authorities about the attack.
The Circassians also continued their attacks on Russian forts, however not as large as before. In the meantime, Mansur tried convincing the Circassian princes and nobles to pick up arms against the Russian Empire. In February 1788, an Armenian merchant, who staid in Aldy for a while, reported that Mansur had sent a letter to the Chechens, in which he promised them that he would soon return with an army of 20,000 and that if he goes to war against the Russian army, "no enemy will be left alive".

=== Anapa campaign of 1788 ===
In April 1788, Pavel Potemkin ordered Peter Tekelli to organize a new campaign against Sudzhuk–Kale and Anapa. However, the strong flood of mountain rivers postponed the campaign to August 1788. A large army under Lieutenant General Talyzin to the crossing of the Kuban with orders to explore the path to Anapa and conduct reconnaissance of Turkish forces. On September 11, the Russians crossed the Kuban river. The Russians successfully overcame enemy attacks and crossed the Ubin river on September 25.

==== Battle of the Ubin River ====
Near the river, Tekelli divided the Russian army into two detachments. A third detachment, led by Lieutenant Colonel Mansurov, went to the upper reaches of the river and discovered a Turkish-Circassian camp. The meeting was unexpected, and before Mansurov was ready to prepare his forces, he was already surrounded by the forces of Sheikh Mansur and Aji Mustafa Pasha. The army of Mansur and Mustafa Pasha was made up of a total of 10,500; 8,000 of whom were Circassians and the remaining 2,500 Turks. Mansurov formed a defensive formation and repelled enemy attacks until reinforcements arrived, which lasted for about 5 hours, after which the combined Turkish–Circassian forces retreated.

==== First siege of Anapa ====
On October 13, the Russian troops approached the Anapa fortress. In the fortress, a garrison of 12,000 was stationed, with an additional 10,000 Circassian and Nogai troops led by Mansur.
The Russian troops began opening fire on Anapa. In the meantime, a Turkish force, among whom was also Mansur, left the fortress and launched a strong attack on the Russians, forcing them to retreat back. Some time later, the Caucasian Corps arrived. The Russian troops wanted to storm Anapa, however, Tekelli refused, and returned to back to Russia.

==== Aftermath ====
The Anapa campaign of 1788 was the end of major hostilities between the two sides for the remainder of 1788 and also 1789. Empress Catherine the Great and Pavel Potemkin were furious at Tekelli for his refusal to storm Anapa, which led to him being deposed from the position of the leader of the Russian forces in the Caucasus and was replaced with Ivan Saltykov. However he did not hold this position for long due to health problems and was recalled and replaced with Yuri Bibikov.
Except for minor raids, most of 1789 was spent by Mansur with sending letters to the North Caucasian peoples, urging them to pick up arms against Russia. In May, a large Turkish army landed on the Black Sea coast and entered Anapa. The Russian command feared that the Ottomans were preparing for a campaign. During that time, they also found out that Mansur had completely restored his army and was preparing for the war. In response, the Russians sent several detachments to the border to Circassia to block invading Russian borders.

=== Anapa campaign of 1790 ===
In response to recent Ottoman and rebel activities, in February 1790, with an army of 7,609 troops, Yuri Bibikov, commander of the Caucasian Corps, invaded Circassia. The Caucasian Corps had no experience in fighting during the harsh weather conditions of winter, and later in the campaign the food supply turned out that the food supply the detachment was given was not enough.
Hearing about the advance of the Russian troops, Circassian families left their houses and fled to the mountains, while others remained and declared their submission to the Russian Empire. During that time, Bibikov received the news that the garrison of Anapa was currently weakly defended and that only 500 troops were stationed in the fortress.
During the whole campaign, Circassian fighters, led by Mansur, frequently entered into skirmishes with the Russians. The deeper the Russian army went into enemy territory, the more frequent and aggressive these ambushes and skirmishes became. Eventually, the Circassian began using scorched earth tactis and set up more ditches and ambushes. By order of Mansur, the Circassians surrounded Bibikov from all sides and frequently attacked Russian troops, cutting off communication between smaller detachments and the remaining army.

==== Battle of the Shibza River ====
On March 15, the exhausted Russian forces reached the Shibza River, not far from Anapa. There, they entered into battle with a 2,000 strong Turkish army led by Aiji Mustafa Pasha. After occupying the heights of the river, the Russians repelled the attack and forced the Ottomans to retreat.

==== Second siege of Anapa ====
Bibikov approached Anapa and occupied a village not far from it. The fortress was defended by around 20,000 soldiers, which were the combined forces of the fortress garrison and the fighters of Mansur. On March 24, two detachments from the defending side left the fortress, one commanded by Aji Mustafa Pasha and Batal Hussein Pasha. The attack was repelled by the Russians though. Batal Pasha retreated back to the fortress, however Mustafa did not manage to reach the fortress gates in time and was forced to go to Sudzhuk–Kale. Then, Bibikov planned to storm the fortress.
However, for the next two days, a severe snow storm hit the Russian troops, killing 150 Russian horses and in a report from Bibikov, he stated that all of his commanders fell ill, except for him. He was left with no other option but to retreat. In the battle, around 1,000 Russians were either killed or wounded.
From that moment began what happened to the Pieri detachment at Aldy. During the whole retreat back to Russia, Russian troops were constantly ambushed and had no more food left. After more than a month, on the 4th of May, Russian troops arrived.

==== Aftermath ====
The Russian casualties counted 2,202 soldiers, with several hundred more dying in the following months due to sicknesses. Yuri Bibikov was deposed as the commander of the Caucasian Corps and was replaced with Anton de Balmen, who also took part in the campaign. He died however in the same year due to his illness which he caught during the campaign.

=== Attempts for a third campaign against Kizlyar ===
After the failed campaign of 1790, Mansur returned to Chechnya, hoping to gather forces and march on Kizlyar again. Uprisings broke out in Dagestan. The Russian Empire, who had recently occupied Crimea, also found out that the Tatars were arming themselves for an anti-Russian uprisings as a result of letters from a "Trans–Kuban Sheikh", which was Sheikh Mansur.

Meanwhile, the Ottoman Empire sent more troops to reinforce Anapa and Sudzhuk–Kale. Russian agents reported that 25,000 Turkish troops had arrived on the Black Sea coast. Back in fall of 1789, Mansur established contact with the Turkic tribes of Central Asia, in which he urged them to march on Astrakhan and destroy the city. His letters found responses from the Turkic tribes — Major General Peutling, noted that "from various Kyrgyz clans, malicious people went to the Volga River to capture our people and drive away cattle."

=== Batal Pasha's campaign through the North Caucasus ===
Batal Pasha decided to travel to the North Caucasus with a large army, in hopes of convincing the North Caucasians to join him. With 33,000 troops and 30 cannons, he went to Kabardia. In response, the Russian side began planning military operations: The plan was that Lieutenant General Baron Rosen should approach the Kuban with his troops, and the Russian fleet from Taman would carry out sabotage against Anapa. Preparations for the operation were completed, but then Count de Balmain died suddenly. General Sergei Bulgakov was appointed the new commander of the Caucasian Corps troops.

The command on the Caucasian line formed three offensive detachments led by Major Generals German and Bulgakov, as well as Brigadier Matzen. The commander of the Kuban Jaeger Corps, Lieutenant General Baron Rosen, and the military ataman Ilovaisky were ordered to carry out an expedition beyond the Kuban against the Circassians.
On September 28, Batal Pasha entered Kabardia, where he hoped to defeat the Russian army and occupy the Georgievskaya fortress.

==== Battle of the Tokhtamysh River ====
On September 29, Russian forces led by General German approached the camp of Batal Pasha, and on September 30, they attacked. 700 Russian troops were sent forth to occupy the heights. He was attacked by a group of mountaineers, but the attack was repelled. Other Russian detachments then also went forth and occupied the River's heights. They were attacked by a Turkish force led by Mustafa Pasha, which was also repelled. Then, Russian forces attacked the left and right flanks of the Turkish–mountaineer army but encountered fierce resistance. Colonel Mukhanov came to their aid, and the surprise attack launched by him at the Ottomans and Circassians forced them to retreat, and Russian forces broke into the camp. The Battle of the Tokhtamysh River ended in a Russian victory and the capture of Batal Pasha and 30 cannons.

After the victory, Lieutenant General Baron Rosen invaded the Circassian lowlands and burnt down several Circassian villages, forcing many to surrender to the Russians. Russian forces withdrawed from the North Caucasus and returned to the North Caucasus Line on November 2, 1790.

At the end of 1790, General Bulgakov, who had not shown himself to be anything special, was replaced as commander of the troops by 48-year-old Chief General Ivan Vasilyevich Gudovich. He was ordered to organize a new campaign against Anapa.

=== Fourth and final Anapa campaign ===
On May 9, a large Russian detachment and 36 cannons under Ivan Gudovich began moving towards Anapa. While moving around the Kuban river, Gudovich placed small garrisons to guard the Kuban.

The garrison of Anapa numbered 10,000 troops, with an additional 15,000 North Caucasians, commanded by Mustafa Pasha. The fortress had 83 cannons and 12 Fortress mortars.

After uniting with other detachments, the Russian army counted 12,170 men and 40 cannons.

The Russian army approached Anapa on June 10 and cut off all outside access to the fortress.

==== Final siege of Anapa ====
On June 12, the Russian forces set up their artillery, and on June 18, they opened fire on the fortress. The fire continued for another day and resulted in the destruction of a large portion of Anapa, including the house of Mustafa Pasha himself. On the 20th, Gudovich sent people to the Pasha in order to negotiate peace. The Russians asked for the surrender of Anapa, promised that the garrison will be spared. If not, a large and brutal attack would be carried out. Mustafa Pasha was ready to accept the offer, but Sheikh Mansur insisted on resistance. The influence of Mansur on the soldiers of Anapa was so great to the point that the troops stopped listening to the Pasha, and soon the garrison opened fire on the Russian troops.
Gudovich decided to launch a surprise attack on the fortress. On June 21, the Russian troops launched a heavy attack on a part of the fortress that was weakly defended and where the walls weren't as high.

At midnight, Russian troops opened fire on the weak bastion, under the cover of which the Russian columns attacked. On 1 pm, the troops retreated. The Turks began celebrating, however half an hour before down, the Russians began bombarding the Russian fortress. Soon after, Russian troops began climbing the walls and eventually occupied the bastion. While a fierce battle was taking place near the walls, 8,000 Circassians stormed outside the fortress and attacked Russian troops. The attack was hardly stopped by the Cossacks, and then completely repelled by Major General Zagryazhsky.

Soon, Russian troops began climbing the wall of the main fortress and repeated attacks resulted in heavy losses of the defenders. Not long after, the Turkish garrison surrendered. The entire defence of the fortress was now only held by the mountaineers led by Sheikh Mansur.
On June 22, at 8 am, Russian forces broke into Anapa and captured all the fortress artillery and 13,532 Turks and a small number of mountaineers, who were unable to fight due to severe wounds. Among them was also Mustafa Pasha, his son Batal Bey and many other Turkish commanders. 8,000 defenders were killed, less tried escaping the fortress via the sea and drowned.

Meanwhile, locked into a warehouse, Mansur refused to surrender. He had no Murids left, as all of them were killed in the battle. Having taken refuge in the powder magazine, Mansur continued firing at the Russians, who refused to storm the warehouse, as Mansur had a lit torch and threatened to blow the building up. The Russians sent a Chechen negotiator to Mansur, promising him the position of an honorary prisoner and decent content in St. Petersburg, where he should be sent to be presented to Empress Catherine II. The general also promised to grant him freedom as a prisoner of war immediately after the conclusion of a peace treaty with Turkey. However, Mansur refused to accept these terms and continued firing.
However, Mansur began running out of ammunition. In the end, he refused to blow up the powder magazine, as he believed that this was suicide, which is strictly prohibited in Islam. He was soon after captured and sent to St. Petersburg, where he was sentenced to life in prison in the Shlisselburg Fortress. He died there on April 13, 1794.

== Aftermath ==
Mansur's capture drained the morale of his remaining supporters, after which the insurgency began to decline. A few days after the siege of Anapa, Russian forces captured the fortress Sudzhuk-Kale, where they met no resistance, along with 25 cannons.

=== Long term effects ===
Mansur's life and teachings had immense effects on the history of the North Caucasus. This resulted in the creation of a new direction in Islam, Caucasian Muridism. This teaching combines the severe asceticism and selflessness of Sufism with participation in ghazavat — the war for faith.

Mansur essentially reformed mountain society and laid the foundations of its statehood, which was implemented by the imams of Chechnya and Dagestan in the 1830s–1850s. He also put an end to the process of national consolidation of the Chechens from the Assy River in the west to Aksai and Aktash in the east, from the peaks of the Main Caucasus Range in the south to the Terek in the north. It was thanks to him that the Chechens, according to contemporaries, entered the 19th century as "the strongest people of the Caucasus" and could be proud of the fact that under the leadership of "Shikh-Imam-Mansur" they were "leaders of almost all the peoples living in the Caucasus Mountains." Many contemporaries noted that thanks to him, Islam was finally being established itself not only in Chechnya, but also in the neighboring regions of the North Caucasus.

== Chronology ==
Chronology of the notable events of the movement:

=== 1785 ===
- February: First public appearances of Mansur.
- March–April: Russian preparations for a campaign against Mansur.
- June: Russian detachment (3,000, 6 cannons) under Nikolai de Pieri invade Chechnya.
- 6–7 July: Battle of Aldy: Defeat of the Russian forces (3,000, 6 cannons) by the Chechens (500 fighters). Russian casualties: 745 killed, 162 captured, 2 cannons. Chechens: 100 killed.
- 8 July: Battle of Alkhan–Yurt: Defeat of the Chechens by Brigadier Fyodor Apraksin. Chechen losses: 170 killed.
- 14 July: Attack on Karginsk: Defeat and capture of the Karginsk redoubt. Russian losses: Heavy; Most of the army killed and captured.
- 16 July: July Siege of Kizlyar: Mansur's forces (5,000+ fighters) attack Kizlyar, but are repelled.
- 17–18 July: Battle with the Tomsk Regiment: The Tomsk infantry regiment (~800 soldiers) attack the camp of Mansur, but are repelled. Heavy Russian casualties.
- 26 July: Mansur travels to Kabardia and convinces some Kabardian princes to join him in the campaign against Grigoriopolis.
- 29–30 July: Battle of Grigoriopolis: Mansur's forces attack the Grigoriopolis Redoubt, but are repelled by the Russian defenders (1,000 soldiers).
- July–August: Several major raids carried out on Russian and Cossack settlements by order of Mansur.
- 20 August: August Siege of Kizlyar: Mansur's forces (10,000–12,000 fighters) attack Kizlyar, but are repelled by the Russian army (2,500–3,000 soldiers, + civilian militias).
- 21 August: Attack on the Tomsk Regiment: Mansur's fighters attack the Tomsk infantry regiment (720 soldiers), but are forced to stop after Russian artillery.
- September: Ingush and Ossetians began attacking Russian fortifications near Vladikavkaz in support for the movement.
- September–December: Umma Khan V, together with some of the commanders of Mansur (20,000 fighters), invade Georgia.
- 1–2 October: Circassians attack Russian fortifications.
- 4 October: Mansur's forces (400 fighters) attempt to attack Kalinovka, but are repelled by Russian artillery.
- 10 October: Circassians (2,000 fighters) try to attack Stavropol, but are repelled on the Kuban River. Another Circassian detachment (1,000 fighters) attacks Russian fortifications. Both sides suffer heavy losses. Meanwhile, a Kabardian detachment (400 fighters) launch a successful raid on the village Nino and capture 500 horses and 800 sheep. Another Kabardian detachment destroyed several Russian redoubts and capture 31 people.
- 12 October: Mansur and his army try to cross the Terek River, but are repelled by Russian artillery.
- 30 October: Mansur's forces (6,000 fighters) try to take Chervlenaya, but are repelled by the detachment of Ivan Lunin.
- 30 October: Battle of the Malka: Mansur's detachment (6,000 fighters) clashes with the detachment of Larion Nagel (4,000 soldiers). The battle ended in no deciding victory for either side.
- 2 November: Battle of Tatartup: Mansur's fighters (20,000 strong), reinforced by Kabardian detachments, clash with Nagel's forces again near Tatartup, but are repelled. North Caucasian losses: 200 killed. Russian losses: 60 killed.
- December: The Russian Empire promises 300 rubles for the head of Mansur.
- End of the year: Decline of the insurgency.

=== 1786 ===
- January: New phase of the uprising, revival of the movement.
- End of July: Russian forces (4,000 soldiers, 4 cannons) led by Larion Nagel invade Kabardia: Capture of Dol Mudarov and the destruction of the Kabardian resistance.

=== 1787 ===
- 17 January: Battle of Kachkalikov: Chechen cavalry fighters ambush a Russian detachment and inflict heavy losses on them, retreating short after.
- 19 January: Russian invasion: In response, Russian detachment invades Chechnya and burns down several villages.
- Mid–June: Karabulak campaign: Mansur's troops (1,000 fighters) invade the Karabulaks, but are forced to retreat after a week.
- 5 July: Mansur moves to Circassia.
- 21 August: Russo–Turkish War: The Russian Empire declares war on the Ottoman Empire.
- 20–25 September: Anapa campaign of 1787: Russian forces (8,000 soldiers, 35 cannons) invade Circassia, with the goal of capturing Anapa. Mansur's forces counted 10,000–11,000 fighters. Russian losses: Up to 200 killed, several hundred wounded.
- 21–22 September: Battle of the Urup River: Russian forces attack a Circassian camp and capture it after heavy losses. Then Mansur's forces (7,000–8,000) attack the Russians and push them back, but are repelled after Russian reinforcements. 3,000 Circassians then reinforce Mansur's army. Russian army withdrew after heavy losses.
  Russian troops attack and burn down several Circassian villages.
- 25 September: Battle of the Kuban River: Mansur's fighters (300–400 fighters) attack a Russian detachment, inflict heavy casualties and then retreat. End of the Anapa campaign with the failure of the Russian troops.
- 14 October–winter: New campaign of the Russian troops against Circassia. Destruction of 300 Circassian villages and Mansur's army.
- 19 October: Battle of the Kafar River: Russian forces (12,750 soldiers) clash with the army of Mansur (5,000 fighters). Defeat of Mansur and his retreat to the Urup River.
- 20 October: Battle of the Urup River: Complete annihilation of Mansur's forces, Mansur himself and his closest commanders barely manage to escape alive.

=== 1788 ===
- 4 January: Chechen fighters attack the Novogladkovskaya state post office near Kizlyar, capturing the sergeant of the Kizlyar garrison battalion Osipov and 7 Cossacks.
- 16 January: Battle of Shchedrinskaya: Detachment of Chechens (600 fighters) attack Shchedrinskaya, but are repelled b a team of rangers (70 soldiers).
- 11 August–14 October: Anapa campaign of 1788: Failed Russian campaign to take Anapa.
- 26 September: Battle of the Ubin River: Russian detachment is attacked by a Turkish–Circassian detachment (10,500 soldiers), but are forced to retreat.
- 13 October: 1788 siege of Anapa: Russian forces clash with the defenders of Anapa (22,000 soldiers), and plan to storm the fortress, however Peter Tekeli refused.
- 15 October: The garrison of the fortress Vladikavkaz is evacuated due to constant raids by Chechen fighters.

=== 1789 ===
- Fall: Mansur establishes contacts with Turkic tribes of Central Asia.

=== 1790 ===
- 10 February–4 May: Anapa campaign of 1790: Russian army (7,609 soldiers, 26 cannons) invade Circassia and attack Anapa but are forced to withdraw after heavy losses (2,202 soldiers lost).
- 15 March: Battle of the Shibza River: Turkish–Circassian forces (2,000 soldiers) attack the Russian detachment, but are repelled.
- 24–26 March: 1790 siege of Anapa: Russian forces attempt to storm Anapa, but a severe snowstorm forces them to retreat. Russian losses: 1,000 killed and wounded. End of the Anapa campaign of 1790 in victory for the Ottoman Empire and Sheikh Mansur.
- Unknown date: Mansur returns to Chechnya to call the people to a third campaign against Kizlyar.
- September: Turkish army (33,000 troops, 30 cannons) invade the North Caucasus in hopes of raising the North Caucasians to revolt against the Russian Empire.
- 29–30 September: Battle of the Tokhtamysh River: Russian forces (3,500 soldiers) attack and defeat the army of Batal Pasha (33,000 soldiers, 30 cannons). Batal Pasha, along with other Turkish commanders are captured.

=== 1791 ===
- 12–22 June: Final siege of Anapa: Russian forces (12,170 soldiers, 40 cannons) attack Anapa, defended by 25,000 combined Turkish–North Caucasian army. Defeat of the Ottomans and North Caucasians: 8,000 dead, about 150 drowned and 13,532 captured. Russian losses: 4,500. Mansur himself is also captured and sent to St. Petersburg, where he is sentenced to life in prison, ending the Sheikh Mansur movement in a victory for the Russian Empire.
- 30 June: Russian forces capture the fortress Sudzhuk-Kale with no resistance. 25 cannons are captured by the Russian army.

== See also ==
- Sheikh Mansur – first Imam of the North Caucasus
