= Siege of Anapa (1791) =

1791 battle of the Russo-Turkish War (1787–1792)

Storming of Anapa
- Part of the Russo-Turkish War (1787–1792), the Caucasian War, and the Sheikh Mansur Movement
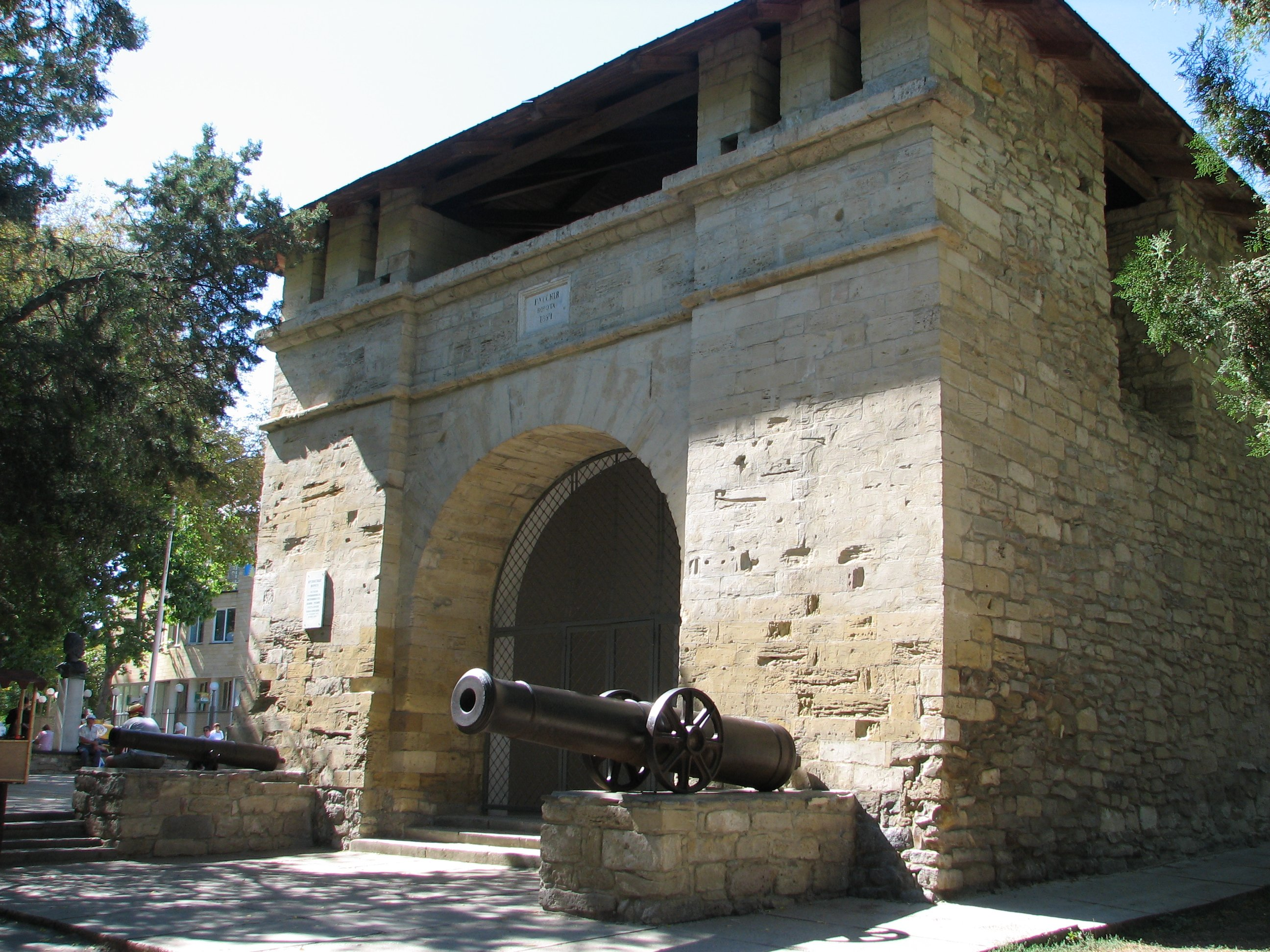
- Gate of the Anapa fortress
Date	June 22 (O.S.) / July 3 (N.S.), 1791
Location	Anapa fortress, Circassia
Result	Russian victory

Belligerents
Russia	Ottoman Empire; Circassia

Commanders and leaders
(Russian Empire) Ivan Gudovich (Russian Empire) Ivan Zagryazhsky (Russian Empire) Sergey Bulgakov (Russian Empire) Anton Schitz (Russian Empire) Ivan Depreradovich	(Circassia) Mansur Ushurma (POW) (Ottoman Empire) Mustafa-Paşa (POW)

Strength
18,000 to approx. 23,910 (Note: 15 battalions, 3,000 jaegers, 54 squadrons, 2 Cossack regiments: 22,920 approx. minimum number as per the norm of those times; maximum approx. 24,900; arithmetic mean 23,910.); • 12,000 excluding tactical and operational reserves and wagon fort (all of the above were engaged)	23,000 to 33,000: 1st claim: • 15,000-strong Ottoman garrison (Anapa); • 8,000-strong Circassian relief; 2nd claim: • 10,000 Turks and 15,000 Tatars, Nogais, South Kubanians, and other tribesmen in the garrison; • 8,000-strong South Kubanian relief

Casualties and losses
2,995 (killed, wounded) to 4,000 privates and 93 officers	8,000 killed and wounded 6,412 prisoners of war (excluding 7,588 women), drowned, or dead 95 cannons

The siege of Anapa or the storming of Anapa (Russian: Штурм Анапы; Adyghe: Быгъуркъал Къэуцухьэ; Turkish: Anapa Kuşatması) was an encounter that took place on July 3, 1791, when the Russian Empire successfully attacked the Turkish-regulated Anapa fort in Circassia as part of the Russo-Turkish War and the Russo-Circassian War.

== Summary ==
=== Previous events ===
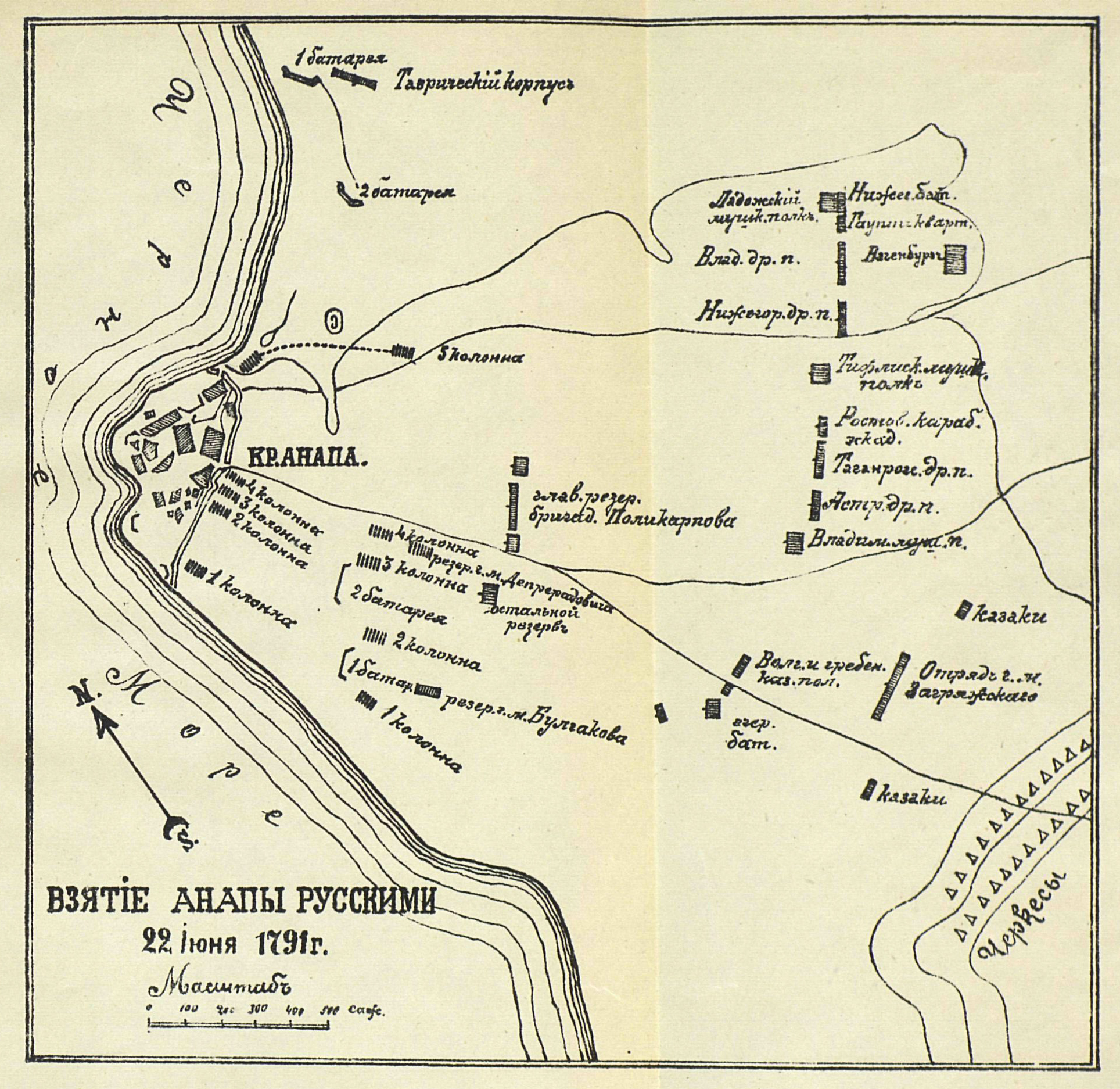
Map of the siege

Anapa, under the name of Bighurqale, was one of the important ports of the Circassians. It was especially frequented by Ottoman merchant ships and missionaries.

During the reign of Catherine II the Russian army started entering Circassia and started the construction of forts in an attempt to quickly annex Circassia. In 1763, Russian forces occupied the town of Mezdeug (modern-day Mozdok) in Eastern Circassia, turning it into a Russian fortress. Thus began the first hostilities between the Circassians and the Russian Empire. The Circassians repeatedly asked the Ottomans for help, to no avail.

The Ottoman Empire lost its protection over the Crimean Khanate with the 1774 Treaty of Küçük Kaynarca. The Russians were continuing their efforts in the Russo-Circassian War to annex Circassia. The Circassians requested help and alliance from the Ottomans. The Ottomans also appointed Ferah Ali Pasha as the guard of Soghujaq in Circassia.

In 1781, on the eastern coast of the Black Sea, the Ottomans, under the leadership of French engineers, built a strong fortress in order to ensure Turkish influence in Circassia and as a base for future operations against Russia in the Kuban and the Don, as well as in the Crimea. The fortress was built on a promontory protruding into the sea and adjoined the sea on three sides. Only one eastern side adjoined the land, which was protected by a high rampart and a deep ditch with sheer walls. The shaft and ditch were partially paved with stone, 4 bastions were built on the shaft, as well as a powerful fortification to protect the fortress gates.

In 1790, a large Russian army led by General Yury Bogdanovich Bibikov crossed the Kuban river and entered the territory of Western Circassia. Bibikov managed to reach Anapa, but failed to capture the castle. He also suffered heavy losses during his retreat. After this defeat, Bibikov was removed from his post and Circassian attacks on Russian forts increased significantly.

=== Gudovich's campaign ===
On January 23 (O.S.), 1791, General-in-Chief Ivan Gudovich, who had just been appointed commander-in-chief of the Kuban and Caucasian corps, received an order from Prince G. A. Potemkin-Tavrichesky to capture Anapa. For the new campaign, Gudovich formed a detachment of 15 battalions, 3,000 snipers, 54 cavalry squadrons and 2 Cossack regiments with 36 field guns. Preparations for the campaign were very serious, taking into account previous failures: the troops were supplied with everything necessary, rear communications were arranged in the form of a chain of small fortifications (the total number of their garrisons was up to 2,500 people), and food transports were prepared.

The total number of the detachment was more than 15 thousand people. The Anapa garrison consisted of 15,000 Turks and Circassians, had 95 guns, and there were several ships armed with guns in the harbor.

On May 29 (O.S.), 1791, Gudovich's detachment crossed the Kuban. The Russian camp was established and in June the first siege battery for 10 guns was laid. Circassian tribes near the region raided Gudovich's camp in an attempt to assist the Turkish castle. Gudovich conducted several strategies to cut off Anapa from the assistance of Circassians. On June, 4 more siege batteries for 32 guns were erected, during continuous bombardment great destruction was made in the fortress, part of the fortress artillery was destroyed.

=== Storming of the castle ===
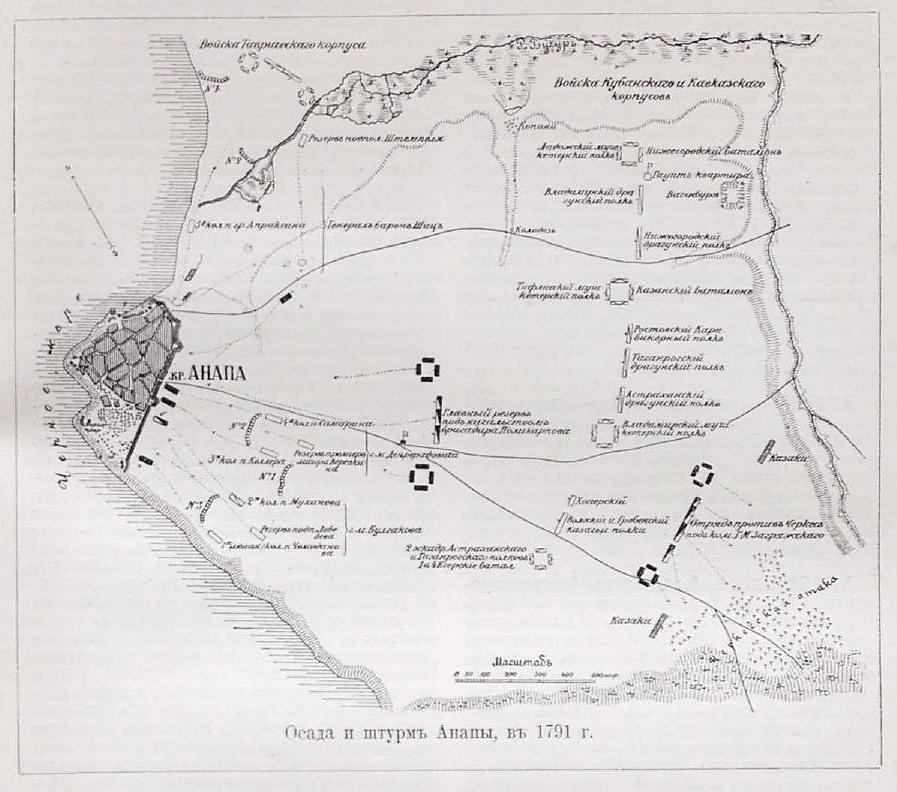
Map of the siege. Three attacking wings are indicated by braces near Anapa fortress. The two southern wings consist of 2 columns each. From top to bottom, under the command of generals: Baron von Schitz, Depreradovich, and Bulgakov. The detachment under General Zagryazhsky from the right below is directed against the Circassians.

Having no funds for a long-term siege, the Russians constantly attacked from the rear and having received information about the approach of the Turkish fleet with reinforcements to Anapa, Gudovich decided to storm Anapa. 5 attacking columns were formed, four of which struck in the southern part of the fortress, where its defense was most damaged. The fifth column was making a distracting detour with the task of breaking into the city along the seashore. The entire cavalry and 16 guns were allocated to the reserve as a separate detachment in case of an attack by the highlanders from the rear. At midnight on June 22 (July 3 N.S.), 1791, all siege batteries began a powerful bombardment of the fortress, under the cover of which the attacking columns secretly reached their starting lines.

The Turkish–Circassian troops were led by three-tug Mustafa Pasha (Paşa), his assistant was Mansur Ushurma, a Chechen sheikh who fought for Circassia and who sent out his appeals demanding militia in the name of religion. At 4 o'clock in the morning the assault began. The Russian troops broke into the ditch and began to climb the walls, but there they were met with strong return fire from the defenders. With great difficulty, the attackers managed to break into the shaft, where the battle reached extreme bitterness.

Soon after the start of the assault, an 8,000 men army of Circassians and Turks conducted a surprise attack into the Russian camp, but could not break into it, and were defeated after a fierce battle.

Having sent the last reserve into battle, Gudovich directed his attack on the fortress gates. They managed to capture and open, after which part of the cavalry received an order to break into the city, partly on horseback, partly on dismount. Only then was it possible to break the organized resistance of the garrison and push it back to the sea.

Once the Russian army entered the fortress, as per Gudovich's orders, the Anapa fort were razed to the ground, wells were poisoned and houses were burned. The entire fort was destroyed. In memory of the capture of the fortress, only one gate was left. After that, the Russian troops left the ruins of the once formidable Turkish fortress. On July 10, Russian troops left Anapa.

=== Consequences ===
The loss of Anapa prompted the Turkish government to abandon Circassia and make peace with Russia: and the Treaty of Jassy was signed.

In his report, General Gudovich reported to Prince Potemkin:

Your Majesty's command has been carried out, Anapa was taken this day at 7 o'clock in the morning. The assault was brutal and bloody, the enemy defended for 5 hours. The victory was finally, with the blessing of the Almighty, carried out successfully...

Making use of the turmoil caused by the fall of the castle, Fyodor Bursak organized several raids against the Western Circassians, and personally ordered his men to burn Circassian villages they see, even those who were loyal to the Russian Empire.

=== Losses ===
The battle lasted over 5 hours. Of the garrison, about 8,000 people died, 13,532 defenders and citizens were taken prisoner (including women). A small part (about 150 people) escaped on ships. Almost all artillery was captured or destroyed (83 cannons and 12 mortars), 130 banners were taken. Among the prisoners were: Mustafa Pasha, his another assistant (the son of Bartal Pasha), many Turkish officials, and Sheikh Mansur, who locked himself in the cellar, stubbornly defended himself there and refused to surrender until General Bulgakov threatened to blow it up.

In the Russian side, according to Russian governmental documents, 23 officers and 1,215 privates were killed, 71 officers and 2,401 privates were wounded.

== See also ==
- Anapa campaign (1787)
- Anapa campaign (1790)
