= Siege of Anapa (1788) =

1788 siege of Anapa
- Part of Anapa campaign of 1788 of the Sheikh Mansur Movement and Russo-Turkish War (1787–1792)
| Date | 13 – 15 October 1788 |
| Location | Anapa Fortress, Ottoman Empire |
| Result | North Caucasian–Ottoman victory |

Belligerents
| Sheikh Mansur Movement; Ottoman Empire | Russian Empire |

Commanders and leaders
| Sheikh Mansur; Tatal-Bey | (Russian Empire) Peter Tekeli (Russian Empire) Johann Hermann von Fersen |

Strength
| 22,000 • 10,000 • 12,000 | 17,500; 33 cannons |

Casualties and losses
| 700 killed | 300 killed 12 cannons |

The siege of Anapa of 1788 was a major confrontation between the North Caucasians led by Sheikh Mansur and Turkish troops led by the commander of Anapa, Tatal-Bey, with a Russian force led by General Peter Tekeli. During the battle, the Russian army managed to force the Turks and North Caucasians into the fortress, after which they began besieging it. However, according to General Tekeli, the Russian army was not ready to storm Anapa yet, and if they managed to capture fortress, it would be difficult to hold. Thus, the Russian troops retreated from Anapa on October 15, 1788, and, except for minor skirmishes with Circassian mountaineers, the siege of Anapa was the last major battle of the campaign and the year 1788 as a whole.

== Background ==
On April 22, Prince Grigory Potemkin ordered General Peter Tekeli to quickly begin military operations in the North Caucasus and attack the fortresses of Sudzhuk-Kale and Anapa. However, the unusually strong flood of mountain rivers in 1788 forced Tekeli to postpone the campaign to August of the same year.

== Prelude ==
On August 11, Peter Tekeli began the campaign and on September 11, hecrossed the Kuban River. Russian forces successfully overcame enemy attacks and crossed the Ubin River on September 25. Having crossed the River, Tekeli divided his troops into a few datchments, among whom, a force led by Boris Mansurov, marched along the Ubin and met a united army of Turks and North Caucasians led by Aji Mustafa Pasha. In the following Battle of the Ubin River, Mansurov's troops were surrounded, but Mustafa Pasha was forced to retreat after the arrival of Russian reinforcements. Following the retreat, Russian troops continued their advance towards Anapa.

== Battle ==
On 13 October, the Russian detachments united and approached the fortress. During this time, a large garrison was located in the fort, preparing it for defense.

The next day, General Hermann, with a detachment of 1 Dragoon Brigade and the Volga Cossack Regiment made a Reconnaissance to Anapa. However, the Anapa artillery suddenly opened heavy fire on the detachment. There, near the Artillery battery, the commander of the Anapa fortress, Tatal–Bey was seen, together with his large Retinue, among whom was also Sheikh Mansur. At the same time, Turkish troops began coming out and hoisted their horsetails and banners on the rampart. Seeing this as sign, North Caucasian fighters, who were hiding in the forest near Anapa, came out, advanced 11 cannons and under the cover of its fire, launched a fierce attack on the Russian troops and forced them to retreat. Janissaries stormed out of the fortress gates and also launched a heavy attack on Hermann's detachment, bringing him into a difficult situation. German's detachment was eventually rescued by the rangers who arrived in time, and then by the detachment of Major General Prince Ratiev. However, now the rangers themselves were in a critical position: Having occupied the village Kuchugury, they were barely managing to repel the attacks of the Circassians.

The Anapa garrison then launched a Sortie and attacked Russian Battalions from the rear. The rangers were saved from complete destruction by a Dragoon Brigade of Nizhny Novgorod and local villagers. The Brigade quickly struck from the flank, repelling the Janissaries and opening the opportunity for the rangers to join the fight. The mountaineers rushed to attack, but were forced to stop the advance after an artillery battery placed by Peter Talyzin rained down cannon fire on the highlanders.

Towards the end of the day, the Turkish–North Caucasian troops returned to the fortress and the main Russian army began advancing on Anapa and started besieging the city. The Russian commanders wanted to storm the fortress, but Peter Tekeli refused. In his marching Journal, he wrote:

According to the notes of Major General Shevich and Colonel German, Anapa cannot be taken soon, except by storm, but I, on the general advice, did not start this for the reason that, having taken the said city, it would not be possible to hold it. For mere glory without any other kind and benefit, losing troops seemed unforgivable to me. For a formal siege there was not enough artillery and not enough charges.”

The Russian troops eventually lifted the siege and began retreating. As a result of the battle, the North Caucasia and Turkish losses amounted to 700 killed.
