= Battle of Aldy =

1785 military conflict in Chechnya

- Part of the Sheikh Mansur Movement
Date	6th – 7th July 1785
Location	Aldy forest, Chechnya (Modern–day Grozny, Chechen Republic, Russia)
Result	Chechen victory

Belligerents
Mansur's fighters	Russian Empire

Commanders and leaders
Sheikh Mansur; Osman–Hajji	(Russian Empire) Pavel Potemkin (Russian Empire) Nikolai de Pieri † (Russian Empire) Sergei Komarsky † (Russian Empire) Ivan Kazin (WIA) (Russian Empire) Vasily Tomara (Russian Empire) Pyotr Bagration (POW)

Units involved
Chechen fighters from Aldy and Alkhan–Yurt	~Tomsk Infantry Regiment: 2 Grenadier Companies Astrakhan Infantry Regiment; ~Kabardian Jaeger Regiment: 2 Battalions 100s of Cavalry Cossack Detachments Artillery

Strength
600	2,000; 2 cannons

Casualties and losses
Chechen claim: 300: 100 killed; 200 wounded; Russian claim: 300 killed: 40 Chechen nobles	1,000+: 745+ killed (Note: 740 lower ranks and 5 officers); 162 prisoners of war (Note: 154 lower ranks and 8 officers); Several hundred wounded; 2 cannons captured

The Battle of Aldy, also known as the Battle of the Sunzha River, was a failed military expedition launched by the Russian Empire with the aim of capturing Sheikh Mansur, who, through his speeches and teachings had gained a wide following the North Caucasus, especially in his hometown Aldy. His teachings on Jihad ("Gazavat" (Note: Chechen: Г1азот, romanized: Ghazot; Russian: Газават, romanized: Gazavat)) and his idea of the unification of the North Caucasian tribes under a single Islamic state concerned the Russian administration, who, as a result, sent a 3,000 strong force under Nikolai de Pieri in order to capture him.

The Russian force was led by Colonel Nikolai de Pieri. It was approximately 3,000 men strong and had 6 cannons. The detachment arrived in the Chechen village Aldy on July 6, 1785, which it captured after a short skirmish with Chechen fighters. The Russians burnt the village down and began retreating to the Sunzha River, where, in the forest of Aldy, it was ambushed by Mansur's fighters, and as a result, the detachment was destroyed and dispersed. In total, 745 soldiers, including Pieri himself and several other commanders were killed and 162 captured. Additionally, hundreds of soldiers were wounded, and the detachment lost both of its cannons. (Note: The detachment originally had six cannons, but Pieri took only two to Aldy, while the remaining ones were kept at the Sunzha River and other strategic places) According to Sheikh Mansur, the Chechen side only suffered approximately 100 killed and 200 wounded.

== Names ==
The event is mainly known as the Battle of Aldy, Battle of the Aldyn forest, Battle of the Sunzha River or just Battle of the Sunzha. Russian authorities at that time referred to it as the Aldy Operation, Aldy Expedition or the Aldy Insurgency.

== Background ==
=== Sheikh Mansur ===
Sheikh Mansur, born Ucherman, was an ethnic Chechen from the Elistanzhkhoy teip. He was born into a peasant family in Aldy, a large village situated on the Sunzha River. Local traditions recount that in his youth, he studied the Quran and Arabic, but due to his family's lack of wealth, he could not pursue an Islamic education. Instead, he spent much of his childhood herding livestock and engaging in agricultural work.
In 1783, Mansur reappeared among his people dressed in distinctive clothing, sparking rumors about his religious and spiritual practices. These rumors led the inhabitants of Aldy to begin referring to him as an Imam. By 1784, news of the new Chechen Imam had spread beyond his home village.
In March 1785, Mansur delivered his first public speeches, calling on the Chechens to forsake their customs of raiding, robbing, and murdering, as well as to cease smoking tobacco and drinking alcohol. He urged them to forgive others, give alms to the poor, and adhere to Islam. His teachings rapidly gained popularity, attracting people from across the North Caucasus to Aldy to hear him speak.
Mansur's teachings eventually extended into the political realm. His objectives included a return to pure Islam, the abolition of adat (traditional customs), Jihad against the North Caucasian pagans, and ultimately, Jihad against the Christians Russian Empire. Additionally, he sought to unite the North Caucasians under the banner of Islam. These ambitions alarmed Russian authorities, prompting them to organize an expedition to arrest Sheikh Mansur. Russian fortresses on the North Caucasus Line were also reinforced.

=== Plan ===
In late June 1785, following unsuccessful ultimatums issued to the North Caucasian peoples, Pavel Potemkin, the commander of Russian forces in the North Caucasus, resolved to deploy a military force under the command of Colonel Nikolai de Pieri to Aldy with the objective of crushing the insurgency and capturing Sheikh Mansur.
The plan involved dispatching a Russian force under the command of Colonel de Pieri, who was tasked with penetrating the stronghold of the rebellious mountaineers in the village of Aldy. He was instructed to approach Aldy from the southwest, a direction deemed by Russian authorities as an unlikely avenue for an attack. From this position, the Russian troops would discreetly encircle the village, proceed to infiltrate it, and subsequently locate Mansur's residence. Their objective was to apprehend Mansur and capture all Chechen guards present. The objective was to surprise Sheikh Mansur and the Chechen insurgents and capture Mansur alive. Upon successfully apprehending Mansur, de Pieri was instructed to deliver him to the headquarters of the Russian authorities.
In case of strong unexpected Chechen resistance, Major general Nikolai Shemyakin, who would be stationed at Alkhan–Yurt, would go to Aldy to support Pieri.

== Prelude ==
=== Russian troops and strength ===
The Russian force under de Pieri was made up of the Astrakhan Infantry Regiment, the Tomsk Infantry Regiment, one battalion from the Kabardian Jaeger Regiment, two grenadier companies, 100 Cossacks and several hundred cavalry and 6 cannons.
As for the strength of the Russian troops, they originally numbered 3,000, but only 2,000 were present during the battle. The remaining 1,000 were stationed along the Russian escape route, guarding it, for example the Wagon fort that was established approximately 2,1 kilometres above the Sunzha River that was guarded by 400 Russian troops under Captain Shurinov.

=== Beginning of the expedition ===
On July 3, 1785, Russian forces arrived at the Cossack village of Kalinovskaya. The following day, they crossed the Terek River. On July 5, at 4 PM, the Russians commenced their march towards Aldy. Pieri had planned to cross the Sunzha River that same night. However, Sergei Komarsky, one of the Russian commanders, along with a local Chechen from Alkhan-Yurt, cautioned him that reaching the Sunzha River that day was impossible and would exhaust the Russian soldiers. Pieri however ignored their advice and continued the march.

On July 6, at approximately 5 AM, Colonel Pieri's detachment reached the Sunzha River. Before entering the forest adjacent to the river, they established a defensive Wagon fort two versts from the crossing, leaving their supply train protected by 400 musketeers and two cannons under the command of Captain Shurinov.

=== Alkhan–Yurt skirmish ===
As the detachment approached the river, they were observed by inhabitants of Alkhan-Yurt, a Chechen village located on the right bank of the Sunzha, 3.2 versts upstream from Aldy. A skirmish ensued between Pieri's forces and the villagers. Despite this encounter, Pieri's detachment, consisting of the Kabardian Jaeger Battalion, two grenadier companies from the Astrakhan Infantry Regiment, and two cannons, proceeded towards the river crossing. Vasily Tomara, one of the Russian commanders, reports: «A firefight began at the river and in the wagon fort behind us. From the moment our detachment arrived at the Sunzha, the Chechens attempted to seize our passage out of the forest. From 5 AM to 11 AM, they continuously engaged us in skirmishes, and their numbers steadily increased.»
The people of Alkhan–Yurt sent for help from Aldy, and soon, fighters from Aldy began arriving in Alkhan–Yurt and joined the skirmish.

The Russian plan had failed — The approach of Russian troops now spread in Aldy. Mansur took charge of the Aldy fighters and moved to the forest. There is another version as well, according to which Mansur already knew about the Russian invasion and even provoked it by telling Russian authorities that he wasn't prepared for an attack.

Eventually, the Pieri detachment crossed the Sunzha River, but as the Russians advanced further into Chechnya, skirmishes with Chechen fighters intensified, soon escalating into a full-scale battle. Consequently, Pieri stationed Vasily Tomara with a number of troops near the Sunzha River to guard the bridge.

The Russian troops proceeded to the forest of Aldy, where they encountered narrow roads. During this movement, Pieri received reports of increased Chechen attacks on the Wagonburg fort. Sergei Komarsky advised Pieri to retreat and reoccupy the Sunzha bridge, a suggestion Pieri declined. Nevertheless, adjustments were necessary: Captain Kugaevsky, initially guarding the Sunzha bridge, was replaced by Tomara, while Kugaevsky was dispatched to support the Pieri detachment. From the opposite bank of the Sunzha, the Chechens engaged in a firefight with approximately 100 Greben Cossacks.

== Battle ==
=== Aldy Skirmish ===
While intense fighting was going on between the detachment of Tomara with the Chechen rebels at the Sunzha River, the main Russian forces advanced towards Aldy. Captain Kugaevsky, leading a contingent of 120 soldiers, had already passed the Aldy forest and was ambushed by Chechen fighters. The engagement resulted in a Russian retreat as Chechen fighters inflicted heavy casualties, including 60 deaths and the capture of Captain Kugaevsky himself, who sustained injuries. Survivors of the encounter managed to retreat under the cover of heavy artillery fire.

=== Capture of Aldy and its destruction ===
Eventually, the principal Russian force traversed the Aldy forest and positioned themselves approximately half a kilometer from Aldy. According to Turkish sources, emissaries sent by Mansur approached Pieri, appealing to the Russian forces to not attack and that Mansur's had not gotten permission from Allah to wage war. If this meeting took place, it had no effect.

Subsequently, under Pieri's command, artillery bombardment was initiated on the village, paving the way for the Russian troops to occupy it. Following a fierce engagement with Chechen fighters that resulted in the death of Mansur's elder brother, the village fell under Russian control. Between 10 and 11 AM, amidst continuous skirmishes with Chechen fighters, Russian forces launched an assault on Mansur's house, but found no one except his Standard-bearer, who was killed by Russian troops. But Mansur had long left. The entire village had been evacuated; women, children, and the elderly sought refuge in nearby forest shelter, while Mansur took command of the Chechen fighters, departed from the village, and strategically cut off the Russian retreat routes. This maneuver effectively trapped the Russian forces within Aldy, unbeknownst to Pieri.

Meanwhile, Pieri directed the Russian troops to burn down Mansur's house. Subsequently, the Russian army withdrew half a kilometer from Aldy and halted to rest and replenish their ammunition. However, the Chechen fighters disrupted the Russian troops' rest: By using Hit-and-run tactics, groups of Chechen fighters emerged from the forest, fired at the Russian troops with gunfire, and swiftly withdrew back into the cover of the woods. After suffering 20 deaths, Pieri ordered cannon fire against the Chechen fighters. Despite this measure, the unpredictability of the Chechen fighters' movements rendered the cannon fire useless.
Pieri issued an order to seize all livestock from the village, a decision opposed by Sergei Komarsky on the grounds that the troops were tired from a long march and intense battle. Despite Komarsky's objection, Pieri insisted on his decision and threatened to remove Komarsky from command.

For some time, Pieri awaited the arrival of local elders, anticipating their request to spare the village and return the seized cattle, after which he would demand from the elders to hand Mansur over. However, no delegation from Aldy arrived, and instead, attacks from the Aldyns intensified. In response, Pieri took command of the 4th, 5th, and 6th Companies of the Kabardian Jaeger Regiment. He invaded Aldy again, expelled the remaining villagers, and ordered the village to be burnt to the ground. Following Aldy's destruction, Pieri gave the order to retreat.

=== Retreat and main battle ===
==== Begin of the retreat ====
As the Russian forces commenced their retreat, they discovered that Mansur's fighters had cut off their escape route. Komarsky proposed to Pieri that they adopt a defensive Square formation and await reinforcements. Pieri, however, dismissed Komarsky's suggestion, ordering him that his "orders be obeyed without further ado".

During the retreat, the Russian troops were organized as follows: leading the vanguard was the grenadier company of the Astrakhan regiment, accompanied by the first cannon. Following them was Lieutenant Myznikov with the 1st company of the Kabardian Jaeger Battalion, alongside Second Lieutenant Lyakhovich. Behind them marched the second grenadier company of the Astrakhan regiment, positioned with the second cannon. Bringing up the rear was the 6th company of the Kabardian Jaeger Battalion, responsible for safeguarding the flanks of the retreating Russian army. The remaining Kabardian Jaeger companies were positioned along the flanks.

The Russian troops initially withdrew from the village with ease, though occasional gunfire could still be heard coming from the burning houses. However, upon entering the forest, the situation dramatically shifted into a full-scale battle.
As the Russians advanced further into the dense forest, they found themselves encircled on all sides by Chechen fighters. Using Guerrilla warfare, the Chechens emerged from behind trees, unleashing a relentless barrage of rifle fire on the retreating Russian forces, resulting in heavy casualties. Pieri himself sustained a wound in the left eyebrow during the engagement.

==== Capture of the second cannon ====
As the panic among the retreating soldiers increased, they released all captured cattle and hastily made their way towards the Sunzha bridge. Before covering even a kilometer through the forest, the wounded Kugaevsky approached Ivan Kazin, commander of the Astrakhan Regiment, and urgently reported that most of the soldiers guarding the second cannon at the rear had been killed. Responding swiftly, Kazin rallied a group of soldiers and rushed to the Astrakhan company responsible for the cannon's defense. However, upon arrival, it was already too late—the cannon had fallen into the hands of Chechen fighters. Risking his life, Kazin led his men in an attempt to recapture the cannon. What ensued was a fierce and intense hand-to-hand combat, where Russian soldiers fought with bayonets and Chechen fighters countered with swords and daggers. The fight ended in a complete Russian defeat, with half of Kazin's soldiers killed and many more wounded. Kazin himself received a wound in the leg. The Russians also failed to recapture the cannon.

After failing to recapture the second cannon, Kazin and his men advanced to the front in an effort to protect the first cannon from relentless Chechen assaults. This also proved useless, as the horses pulling the cannon were killed. Consequently, the Russian soldiers were forced to carry the cannon themselves, carry boxes of shells while continuously fending off Chechen attacks.

==== Attack on the detachment headquarters ====
The Chechens launched a fierce assault on the center of the Russian army's headquarters, where Colonel Pieri was. During the attack, Pieri sustained a second wound, which proved fatal. His Orderly, the young lieutenant Pyotr Bagration a future hero of the Napoleonic Wars, rallied a group troops to protect Pieri. Intense Hand-to-hand combat ensued between the Russian soldiers and the Chechen fighters. Bagration continued fighting off the Chechen attackers until he fell unconscious due to bloodlos, following which he was captured. Meanwhile, the Astrakhan regiment, tasked with covering the flanks of the Russian force, suffered heavy casualties. Overwhelmed, they began to flee onto the road, where they became easy targets for rifle fire.

==== Retreat to the bridge and death of Komarsky ====
The gunfire intensified, but eventually, the soldiers spent all of their ammunition and resorted to using bayonets. Similarly, the Chechens, having also depleted their ammunition, charged at them with swords and daggers. The remaining soldiers hastily retreated to the bridge and were stopped by Sergei Komarsky several times, who ordered them to charge at the Chechens. Komarsky, who was wounded in the leg, remained in line with a small number of rangers and continued to retreat to the crossing, fighting off the advancing Aldyns with bayonets. Shortly before the bridge, Komarsky fell from his second wound and had no more strength left to move, and several other killed soldiers fell on top of him.

The death of de Pieri and Komarsky caused complete disarray among the remaining Russian troops. It was here, that, according to Pavel Potemkin, Russian order collapsed and the soldiers fled. He wrote "The mountaineers cut down their unarmed men and took those wandering around the forest prisoner.".

==== Capture of the first cannon ====
Ivan Kazin led the remaining remnants of the detachment, commanding them to continue moving the cannon forward. However, due to the significant casualties suffered by Kazin's troops, the Chechens succeeded in capturing the first and final cannon as well. The surviving soldiers, many of whom were wounded, managed to bring the injured Kazin to the Sunzha bridge with great difficulty.

==== Crossing the Sunzha bridge ====
As a result, only a small portion of the army managed to cross the Sunzha. During the retreat, the detachment's commander was killed, and nearly all officers were either killed, wounded, or captured. Both cannons were seized, along with all soldiers who attempted to flee through the forest. Upon reaching the Sunzha, the soldiers hurriedly plunged into the river and swam to the opposite bank. The pursuing mountaineers fired indiscriminately at the soldiers crossing the ford, killing many in the process. A rumor later spread in Chechnya that after this battle, the Sunzha turned red with blood and was covered with the caps of Russian soldiers floating on its waves.

The battle did not conclude there. After crossing the Sunzha, Chechen fighters, now also arriving from Alkhan–Yurt launched an assault on the Russian troops stationed at the Sunzha bridge under the command of Vasily Tomara. Tomara rallied the remaining soldiers and, while engaging the Chechens, managed to retreat to the Wagenburg fort. The fighting continued there for another two hours, allowing the Russian soldiers time to prepare for their final retreat.

Before setting off, the Russian troops beat their drums, hoping to signal any remaining soldiers in the forest to rejoin the main army. However, no one responded. Suddenly, the Chechen fire ceased. According to Chechen legends, Osman-Hajji, a loyal supporter of Mansur, released the captured Pyotr Bagration without demanding a ransom (See Legends section).

==== Retreat from Chechnya ====
Gradually, the battle drew to a close as fighters from Aldy and Alkhan-Yurt consolidated under Mansur's leadership in front of the entrance of the forest. Mansur aimed to eliminate the Russian forces, but Tomara, focused solely on saving what remained of his troops, took action. He loaded the wounded onto carts, formed a square formation, and ascended the mountain, pursued relentlessly by 500 Chechens on foot and horseback. Despite their exhaustion, the Russians continued their retreat, intermittently engaging the approaching Chechens with gunfire. The pursuit persisted until 10 PM, when the Chechens halted due to darkness.

== Aftermath ==
=== Casualties ===
In total, the Russians had lost more 1,000 men, approximately more than half of the soldiers that participated in the battle. 745 of them were killed, and among them were 740 lower ranks and 5 officers. 162 people were captured by the Chechens, among whom were 154 lower ranks and 8 officers, and several hundred were wounded. The Kabardian Jaegers suffered the most casualties, suffering almost 600 killed (only a few survived). The Astrakhan Regiment suffered 110 killed, while the Tomsk regiment suffered 71 killed.

According to Mansur during his Interrogation, approximately 100 Chechens were killed and another 200 wounded. However, according to Russian reports, 300 Chechens were killed, including 40 "noble" Chechens. This report is most likely exaggerated, as there were only 500 – 600 adult males in Aldy at that time, many of whom did not take part in the battle.

=== Battle of Alkhan–Yurt ===
On July 6, Brigadier Fyodor Apraksin received orders from General Leontyev to support Pieri's detachment. However, Apraksin only arrived on July 8, by which time the remnants of Pieri's detachment had long since departed.

Upon reaching Alkhan-Yurt, Apraksin ordered cannon fire on the village, but received no answer from its inhabitants. He dispatched Ural Cossack detachments to the village, yet encountered no resistance initially. However, as the Cossacks entered the ford, they were ambushed by Chechen fighters. The ensuing battle lasted for two hours until the Chechens exhausted their ammunition, after which Apraksin's troops set the village on fire.

The Chechens attempted to cross to the other side of the Sunzha River to save their crops, which had been set on fire by the Russian forces. This move rendered them vulnerable to artillery fire and further attacks by the Ural Cossacks, as well as two squadrons of Astrakhan dragoons. The conflict resulted in approximately 270 Chechen fatalities, including Osman-Hajji, who had been dispatched by Sheikh Mansur.

In his report to Potemkin, Apraksin highlighted the effective use of artillery but indicated his refusal to advance to Aldy, where "the newly–minted Sheikh" was located. The defeat at Alkhan-Yurt did not hinder the rise of Sheikh Mansur, on the controary, it embittered the Chechens even more, fueling their desire for retribution.

=== Chechen and North Caucasian reaction ===
The Battle of Aldy represented the most devastating defeat suffered by the Russians in the North Caucasus up to that time. The Russian detachment lost more than a third of its personnel and completely failed to accomplish its mission.

In the aftermath of the battle, Mansur visited Aldy to express his profound sympathy to the families of the Shuhada (martyrs). Dhikr and other Islamic rituals were conducted in honor of the fallen. One week following the funerals, ceremonies and celebrations were held to mark the significant victory. People gathered for the celebration not only from Chechnya but from across the entire Caucasus. The people of Aldy slaughtered cows and sheep to feast their guests and provided alms to the poor. Organizing such celebrations was particularly challenging, as Aldy had been utterly devastated by the tsar's troops. Mansur, just like the rest of his people, lost everything: His house was burnt to the ground, his elder brother died, and he lost all of his possessions.

The utter destruction of their village did not demorilize the people of Aldy however, but only strengthened their determination to take revenge on the Russians. Mansur held a speech, addressing his fighters:

"Renowned sons of the Chechen people, celebrated in legends!

I bow deeply before you today. Thanks to the great Allah, to you, and to your unyielding spirit, we have overcome the treacherous enemy who invaded our land. The enemy is cunning and sought to destroy us by taking us by surprise. But he did not consider that Allah is with us, that He is in our hearts and in our prayers. Yes, it is He who aided us in our righteous cause. The invaders planned to surround our village early in the morning while we were still asleep and drown us in a sea of blood. They miscalculated and found what they brought us—death. But there is no joy in our hearts. The loss of our best sons is a tragedy for us. No one can bring them back, but they will forever remain in our memory.

Those who gave their lives for us left behind families—mothers, fathers, wives, and children. From this day forward, we will care for them and assist in all matters. All those whom we buried today were the best and bravest sons of our people, of all the peoples of the Caucasus. They once again showed that while we, the highlanders, can be killed, it is impossible to defeat us, to break our spirit. And in this lies our strength. Now we must remain vigilant, we must thank God, pray, give alms, and prepare to repel new enemy incursions. What has happened is only the beginning. Only our readiness to offer a worthy response, our steadfastness and unity can sober the enemy and make him reconsider. Although it is hard to believe that defeat will teach the tsar's commanders anything. Their misfortune is that they consider us savages, incapable of resistance. They thought we would scatter at the first cannon shot. We proved them wrong. Let's see if they understand this lesson.

My brave people! I am proud to be a Muslim and a son of Chechnya. I am always with you, in joy and in sorrow. We will strive to avoid war not because we fear the enemy, but because war is hateful to the Almighty. We do not need it either. But if we are not allowed to live in peace, we will all rise as one to defend our land. May the Almighty Allah help us in our righteous cause!"

=== Russian reaction ===
The defeat of the Pieri detachment came as a shock to Russian authorities. The commanders of the North Caucasus Line immediately strengthened the Caucasus line fortifications. Non–strategic forces and redoubts were abandoned, and large fortresses, such as Kizlyar, Mozdok, Vladikavkaz and others. Potemkin also ordered Russian troops to be sent to Kabardia in order to prevent them from joining Mansur's army. Potemkin, studying the orders, reports, dispatches and interrogations of the participants of the Aldy campaign makes an attempt of explaining the Russian defeat:

"it is easy to understand that Pieri, despising the Chechen people, did not wait for Brigadier Apraksin's detachment and wanted to accomplish everything alone. Thus, he rushed through the same narrow passage, which was already filled with Chechens, hoping to easily disperse them. If instead of this route from the village of Aldy he had gone through Khan-Kale, not only would the misfortune have been avoided, but there also would have been no bloodshed, as the Chechens, expecting Pieri's detachment at the same passage, would not have been able to hinder him."

Potemkin also criticised the destruction of Aldy by Russian troops. According to him in his report, Pieri should have first asked the Chechens to hand over Mansur, because then the Chechens would know why Russian troops appeared "and perhaps they would prefer to hand over the villain rather than fight for him and expose themselves to revenge."

=== Legends ===
According to a North Caucasian legend, during the final assault on Vasily Tomara's position, the Chechens abruptly ceased their fire. Emerging from the forest, a group of Aldy fighters carrying a white flag approached, bearing the gravely wounded Pyotr Bagration. Osman-Hajji, the Chechen man carrying the flag, stepped forward and addressed Tomara.

"The Imam saw how this man fought," said Osman Hajji. "He respects brave men, even if they are enemies."

"Thank you and we are ready to pay the ransom," replied Tomara.
"We don’t sell or buy brave men," Osman-Hajji responded.

Thus, Bagration was handed over without a ransom.

Another legend recounts a similar event:

A Chechen fighter approached the Russian headquarters on the Sunzha River, carrying the wounded Pyotr Bagration. The Russians, astonished by the noble gesture, inquired:

"Mansur gives the officer away just like that, without ransom?"

"I don't take ransom for real men," said the mysterious figure, handing over Bagration before vanishing back into the forest. Only later did the Russians realize that this man was Sheikh Mansur himself.
