= Battle of Shchedrinskaya =

1788 military conflict in Chervlyonnaya

- Part of Sheikh Mansur Movement
Date	16th January 1788
Location	Plantage near Chervlyonnaya (Shchedrinskaya)
Result	Russian victory

Belligerents
Chechen fighters	Russian Empire

Commanders and leaders
Unknown	(Russian Empire) Lieutenant Gagarin

Units involved
Detachment of Chechen fighters from the villages Sunzha, Germenchuk, Shali, Aldy and others	Team of Rangers

Strength
~600	70

Casualties and losses
22 killed 50 drowned	14 killed

On January 16, 1788, Chechen fighters attempted to attack a plantation near Chervlyonnaya, spurred by Sheikh Mansur's letters urging them to attack Russian settlements. However, the Russian Empire repelled the attack.

== History ==
After suffering a heavy defeat in the 1787 October Campaign, Sheikh Mansur was forced to retreat to the fortress Sudzhuk-Kale. There, he began sending several letters to the peoples of the Caucasus, called on them to fight against the Russian Empire and attack Russian and Cossack settlements. In one of the letters, sent to the Chechens on January 1, Mansur promised them that he would soon return to Chechnya with an army of 6,000 cavalry, 9,000 infantry, and artillery, after which he would go to war with the Russians. Until then, he told them to intensify in their attacks on Russian borders. Caucasus Viceroy Peter Tekeli commented that "supported by assurances from the shikh, gathering in large detachments, they carry out attacks everywhere."

The Chechens began carrying out more raids, such as a raid on the Novogladkovskaya state post office near Kizlyar, capturing the sergeant of the Kizlyar garrison battalion Osipov and several Cossacks. "Inflamed by Mansur's letters," Tekelli reported, "the Chechens are increasingly disobeying their rulers and elders and launching attacks on the Russian borders."

On the night of January 16, a detachment of 600 Chechens crossed the Terek River and made their way to the plantation, 40 miles from the village Chervlyonnaya. The detachment, according to Russian authorities, included several people from villages considered loyal to the Russian Empire. The Chechens had passed through villages subject to the Aksai princes, previously considered loyal to Russia, leading pro-Russian Chechen princes to claim that the Aksai nobility were "not strong to keep their subjects, inflamed by Mansur's letters."

The same day, the Chechens attacked the plantation, but there they were met by a team of 70 rangers. The disorganized Chechens were repelled and suffered 22 deaths. While trying to flee across the Terek River, another 50 fighters drowned.
