= Anton de Balmen =

Russian general of Scottish origin (1741–1790)

Viceroy of Caucasus
- In office 1790
- Preceded by: Ivan Saltykov
- Succeeded by: Ivan Gudovich

Personal details
- Born: 1741
- Died: 15 October 1790 (aged 48–49) Georgiyevsk

Military service
- Commands: Rostov Carabinieri Regiment; Russian Caucasian corps
- Battles/wars: Russo-Turkish War (1768–1774); Sheikh Mansur movement; Russo-Turkish War (1787–1792)

Count Anton Bogdanovich de Balmen (Russian: Антон Богданович де Бальмен; 1741 – 15 October 1790) was a Russian general of Scottish origin who served as the governor-general of Kursk and Oryol. He was also a commander of the Russian Caucasian Corps.

== Biography ==
A member of the de Balmen family, his father came to Russia during the reign of Empress Anna and entered the Russian service as a major. Since childhood, Anton de Balmen was enlisted in the Preobrazhensky Life Guards Regiment. In 1758, he was an ensign, and three years later, he was promoted to lieutenant colonel.

He participated in the Russian-Turkish War in 1770, as commander of the Rostov Carabinieri Regiment, where he distinguished himself during the assault on Bendery and the capture of the Perekop fortifications and the city of Kaffa by storm. Rose to the rank of major-general in 1774. He served in the army in Ukraine and participated in the liquidation of the Zaporozhian Sich. He was promoted to lieutenant-general in 1780.

In 1784, de Balmain was appointed director of First Cadet Corps. From 1786 to 1789 he was the Governor-General of Kursk and Oryol. On 20 November 1786, he was awarded the Order of St. George of the 4th degree.

He was appointed commander of Russian Caucasian Corps from May to October 1790, during Russo-Turkish War of 1787–1792, where, after the unsuccessful expedition of General Yuri Bibikov to Anapa, matters were in extremely poor condition. De Balmen arrived in the Caucasus completely ill with consumption and died on 4 October 1790, in Georgievsk. Among other awards, Balmen had the Order of St. Alexander Nevsky.

== Family ==
He was married to Countess Elena Antonovna de Vieira, granddaughter of Peter I's associate Anton de Vieira (1682–1745). For the merits of Count de Balmen, Empress Catherine II granted his widow 500 serfs and several thousand acres of land, and placed the children in educational institutions at public expense. They had several children:

- Alexander Antonovich (1781–1848), was brought up in the First Cadet Corps. He was a Russian commissar under Napoleon I during his stay on the island of St. Helena in 1815-1821. His notes were placed in the "Russian Archive" for 1868. He was married to Glafira Nikolaevna Svistunova (b. 1801). Grandfather of Elizabeth Augustovna Shar (1858–1888), wife of the artist Vasily Surikov (1848–1916);
- Sofya Antonovna (d. 1822), graduate of the Smolny Institute, married to M. S. Kozlovsky (1774–1853);
- Elena Antonovna, a graduate of the Smolny Institute;
- Karl Antonovich (1786–1812), major general, died of wounds in Vilna;
- Pyotr Antonovich, graduate of the Corps of Pages;
  - Yakov (1813–1845), was an adjutant of General Alexander von Lüders and died in the Caucasus in the Dargin expedition of 1845;
  - Sergei (b. 1816), a close friend of Taras Shevchenko, was arrested in 1848 and was under police surveillance;
  - Alexander (1819–1879), commanded the 3rd Brigade of the 2nd Guards Cavalry Division in the Russian-Turkish Ear of 1877–1878.

== Sources ==
- Stepanov, V.B. (2005). Наместники и губернаторы Курского края. 1779-1917 гг. Исторические очерки [Governors and Governors of the Kursk Territory 1779-1917 Historical essays] (in Russian). Курская городская тип. ISBN 5-8386-0058-6.
- Sytin, Ivan (1911). "Бальмен, де, Антон Богданович, граф" [Balmen, de, Anton Bogdanovich, Count]. Военная энциклопедия [Military Encyclopedia] (in Russian). Vol. 4. Saint Petersburg: Военная энциклопедия Сытина.
