= Battle of the Shibza River =

- Part of Anapa campaign of 1790 of the Sheikh Mansur movement and Russo-Turkish War (1787–1792)
Date	15th March 1790
Location	Shibza River, near Anapa
Result	Russian victory

Belligerents
Ottoman Empire; Sheikh Mansur movement	Russian Empire

Commanders and leaders
Aji Mustafa Pasha; Sheikh Mansur	(Russian Empire) Yuri Bibikov

Strength
2,000	7,600; 16 cannons

Casualties and losses
~100 killed	~400 killed

The Battle of the Shibza River (also spelled Shibze) was a short battle between Russian forces led by Yuri Bibikov and combined Turkish–Circassian troops led by Aji Mustafa Pasha. It ended in a Russian victory.

== History ==
On February 10, General Yuri Bibikov launched the Anapa campaign of 1790 and crossed the Kuban River. Despite that harsh winter climate, with his troops not having been trained to fight in winter conditions, as well as constant skirmishes with Circassian fighters led by Sheikh Mansur, Bibikov continued his campaign.
With not much food left the Russian forces, on March 15, 1790, arrived at two gorges overlooking the Anapa plain. Going along the left gorge, he reached the Shibza River, where the exhausted Russian army was suddenly attacked by a 2,000 strong Ottoman–Circassian force led by Aji Mustafa Pasha. Despite the poor condition of the Russian troops, they managed to occupy the River heights and forced the enemy army to retreat after a short battle. Soon after, Bibikov continued his campaign, but he was accompanied by constant skirmishes with Circassian fighters led by Sheikh Mansur. Nevertheless, this did not stop him and he continued advancing towards Anapa, where he suffered a crushing defeat, which forced him to flee and end his campaign.
