= Battle of the Kuban River =

1787 battle between the Russian Empire and North Caucasian insurgents

- Part of Anapa campaign of 1787 of the Sheikh Mansur movement
Date	25 September 1787
Location	Kuban River
Result	Inconclusive; Attack repelled; Heavy Russian casualties; End of the campaign

Belligerents
Sheikh Mansur movement: Circassians	Russian Empire

Commanders and leaders
Sheikh Mansur	Unknown

Units involved
Detachment of Circassians	Kazan Infantry Regiment

Strength
300	1,500

Casualties and losses
Unknown	200 killed 400 wounded

The Battle of the Kuban River in September 1787 was an ambush by Mansur's forces on the Russian rear guard. The attack was repelled with heavy Russian losses.

== History ==
After their failed military operations in Circassia, the Russian detachment, led by General Ratiev, made its way to the Caucasus line. While going along the Kuban River, the Kazan infantry Regiment was sent forth for the safety of the remaining army, as there could be potential ambushes and traps on the River Gorge. In the night of 25 September, Mansur's forces, numbering between 300 and 400 fighters, under the cover of darkness, launched a surprise attack on the Kazan Infantry Regiment, which formed the rear guard of the Russian army.
Mansur almost managed to crush the regiment, but his forces were poorly equipped, with most being armed with bows and arrows instead of firearms. After a two-hour long battle, Mansur's fighters retreated.
Shortly after, the Russian army received the order to withdraw their forces and retreat beyond the Kuban, due to the failure of the campaign and the large amount of losses suffered by the Russians. Up to 200 were killed, several hundred were wounded.
