= Battle of Alkhan–Yurt =

1785 skirmish in Chechnya

- Part of the Sheikh Mansur Movement
Date	8 July 1785
Location	Alkhan–Yurt (Modern–day Alkhan–Yurt, Republic of Chechnya, Russian Federation) 43°14′00″N 45°33′57″E
Result	Russian victory

Belligerents
Sheikh Mansur Movement	Russian Empire

Commanders and leaders
Prince Atkhan †; Prince Alkhan †; Osman–Hadji (WIA)	(Russian Empire) Fyodor Apraksin

Casualties and losses
270 killed	215 killed

The Battle of Alkhan–Yurt, or the Battle of Alkhanov was a military engagement between the Russian troops led by Brigadier Fyodor Apraksin and the villagers of the Chechen village of Alkhan–Yurt as well as volunteers from Aldy. Brigadier Apraksin was originally supposed to help the Pieri detachment at Aldy but arrived too late and was ambushed by Chechen fighters when trying to capture the village Alkhan–Yurt. The Chechens however suffered heavy casualties.

== History ==
On July 6, Brigadier Fyodor Apraksin received an order from General Wrede Leontiev to approach the Aldy crossing, from which he was 32 kilometers away, to help the retreating Pieri detachment. Despite the guide's assurances that the path to the crossing was not long, the soldiers arrived there only in the afternoon of July 8. By this time, the remnants of Pieri's detachment were no longer here.

Apraksin then went to Alkhan–Yurt and opened rifle fire on it, but no one responded, so he sent a detachment of Ural Cossacks to the village. The detachment went through the village and did not meet anyone, but as they descended to the ford, Chechen fighters came out behind bushes and trees and ambushed the Cossacks. The fighters also sometimes gathered in large crowds and attacked. In his report, Apraksin reported that, fearing large losses from his soldiers, he did not cross to the other side of the Sunzha to punish the residents of Aldy, “where the newly–minted Sheikh was also found.”
After around 2 hours, the shooting by the Chechens stopped, as they ran out of ammunition, after which Brigadier Apraksin burnt down the whole village and it's grain crops. The Russian soldiers went to the Sunzha River to restock on water for their horses, but as they approached it, they were ambushed again by Chechen forces. At the same time, the rebels tried to cross to this side of the Sunzha and save the bread that had been set on fire by the tsarist troops. The Ural Cossacks, reinforced by two squadrons of Astrakhan dragoons, were sent against them. In the shootout that ensued between the rebels and Apraksin's troops, about 30 highlanders were killed, as well as the prince of the village, Atkhan, and also prince Alkhan and an elder of Aldy, Osman–Hadji, who was sent by Sheikh Mansur. They led the Chechen forces on horseback, but succumbed to cannon fire.

“During the battle,” noted Brigadier Apraksin in his report, “the Chechens were all on fresh horses and always kept a few fathoms from the forest so that they could quickly take cover.” After the burning of the village of Prince Alkhan, it was decided to steal the herd that belonged to the residents of Alkhan–Yurt — Up to two hundred heads of cattle. Returning to Malaya Kabarda, Brigadier Apraksin compiled a very lavish report on the victories of his detachment. It was reported, for example, that “a huntsman's bandoleer was removed from one dead man, and one banner and a drum were knocked off; the shape shows that it came from the false prophet (Sheikh Mansur) himself. The drum and banner were given to the Ural Cossacks, and the cattle were divided among the lower ranks of the entire detachment”. Despite the defeat of the Chechens, this did not hinder the rapid growth of Sheikh Mansur popularity in the North Caucasus.
