= Anapa campaign (1787) =

Russian military failed attack to capture fortress of Anapa

- Part of Sheikh Mansur Movement
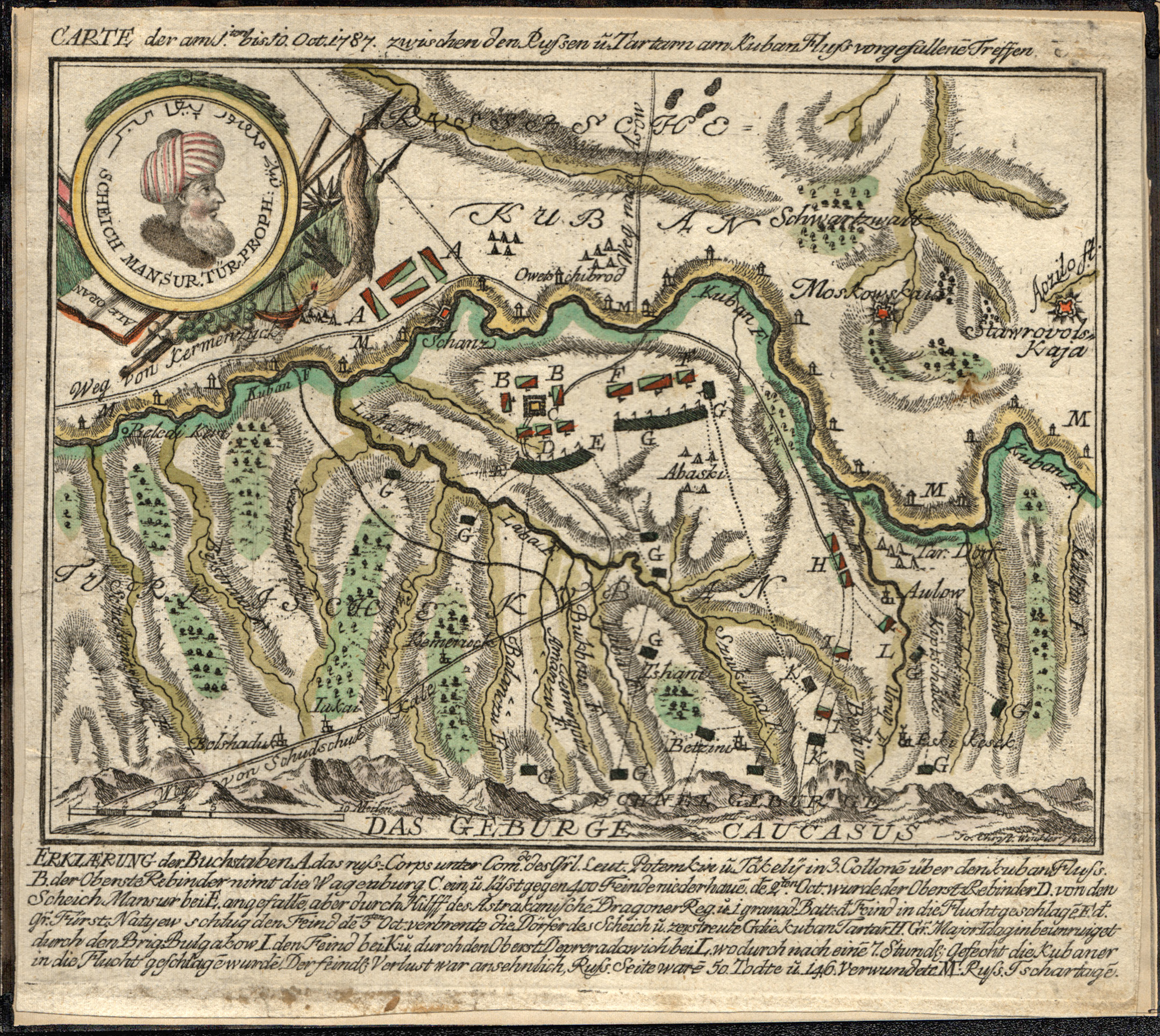
- Map of the Kuban River in October 1787, with Sheikh Mansur at the top–left
Date	20–25 September 1787
Location	Anapa, Circassia, North Caucasia
Result	North Caucasian–Ottoman victory

Belligerents
Sheikh Mansur Movement; Ottoman Empire	Tsardom of Russia

Commanders and leaders
Sheikh Mansur; Kose Pasha	(Russia) Maxim Rebinder (Russia) General Ratiev

Strength
11,000	8,000; 35 cannons

Casualties and losses
Unknown	200+ killed 400+ wounded

The Anapa campaign (1787) was a military expedition launched by the Russians to capture the fortress of Anapa. The Russians failed to capture the fort.

== Background ==
The Ottoman Empire declared its war on Russia on August 13, 1787. The empress of Russia, Catherine the Great, declared war against the Ottomans in response. These events made the Ottomans establish an alliance with the Chechen leader, Sheikh Mansur. The Ottomans sent expensive presents, hoping to recruit the Caucasians to join them in their ranks. Imam Mansur was also seeking help from the Ottomans against the Russians, saying that he exhaustively fought the Russians continuously. The Ottoman sultan dispatched a clock and binoculars as a gift and recognized Mansur as the leader of the Caucasian people. The Ottomans also dispatched the governor of Trabzon, Kose Mustafa Pasha, to Anapa in order to support Imam Mansur. Mansur learned of the Ottoman march and went to meet them.

== Campaign ==
Catherine dispatched an army to conquer the Ottoman fortress of Anapa, and Tsemez, a Russian force consisting of 8,000 men and 35 cannons, led by General Potemkin, was marching towards Anapa. Mansur was marching as well; however, he encountered the Russian army in Obun, a place between Laba and Urup. Imam Mansur's force was 7,000 men, consisting of people from Circassia, Chechenia, Kuban, and the Nogais. Mansur fought the Russians from September 20 to 22. The Chechens weren't able to compete with the Russians, so they withdrew. Immediately after this battle, Potemkin marched to Anapa and arrived there on September 25. The Russians thought Anapa was abandoned; however, the Imam with a detachment of 300 people, under the cover of darkness, attacked the rearguard of the Russian troops and almost crushed it, After a two-hour battle, Mansur's warriors retreated.

On the same day, General Ratiev and his troops received an order to retreat beyond the Kuban. The main goal for this campaign did not end in success. Russian troops failed to capture the rebel imam and defeat his troops. In the battle with the Caucasians, the Russians suffered significant losses. Up to 200 people were killed, and there were also a large number of wounded. In this regard, on September 25, Potemkin ordered the troops to return to the shores of the Kuban.

== See also ==
- Anapa campaign (1788) – second Russian campaign against Anapa
- Anapa campaign (1790) – third Russian campaign against Anapa

== Bibliography ==
- Oztas, Ahmet (2013). A Page from the History of the North Caucasus: Imam Mansur Ushurma. EHESS. pp. 1–14.
- Şahin, Mustafa (2017). Şahin, Büşra (ed.). Aşk Özgürlüktür Şeyh Şamil (in Turkish). YAYINEVİ. pp. 1–235. ISBN 9786058299702.
- Kutlu, Tarık (2005). Çeçen direniş tarihi [History of the Chechen resistance] (in Turkish). Anka Yayınları. pp. 1–637. ISBN 9789759044046.
- Мусаев, Алаудин (2007). Шейх Мансур [Sheikh Mansur] (in Russian). pp. 68–69.
