= Kachkalyk =

Kachkalyk Качкалык Качкалик Къачкъалыкъ
- Selo
- Location within Republic of Dagestan Location within Russia
- Coordinates: 42°37′N 47°19′E
- Country: Russia
- Region: Republic of Dagestan
- District: Buynaksky District
- Time zone: UTC+3:00

Kachkalyk (Russian: Качкалык; Dargwa: Качкалик; Kumyk: Къачкъалыкъ,Qaçqalıq) is a rural locality (a selo) in Chankubinsky Selsoviet, Buynaksky District, Republic of Dagestan, Russia. The population was 421 as of 2010. There are 3 streets.

== Geography ==
Kachkalyk is located 34 km southeast of Buynaksk (the district's administrative centre) by road. Chankurbe and Kadar are the nearest rural localities.
