= Johann Hermann von Fersen =

Imperial Russian Army officer (1740–1801)

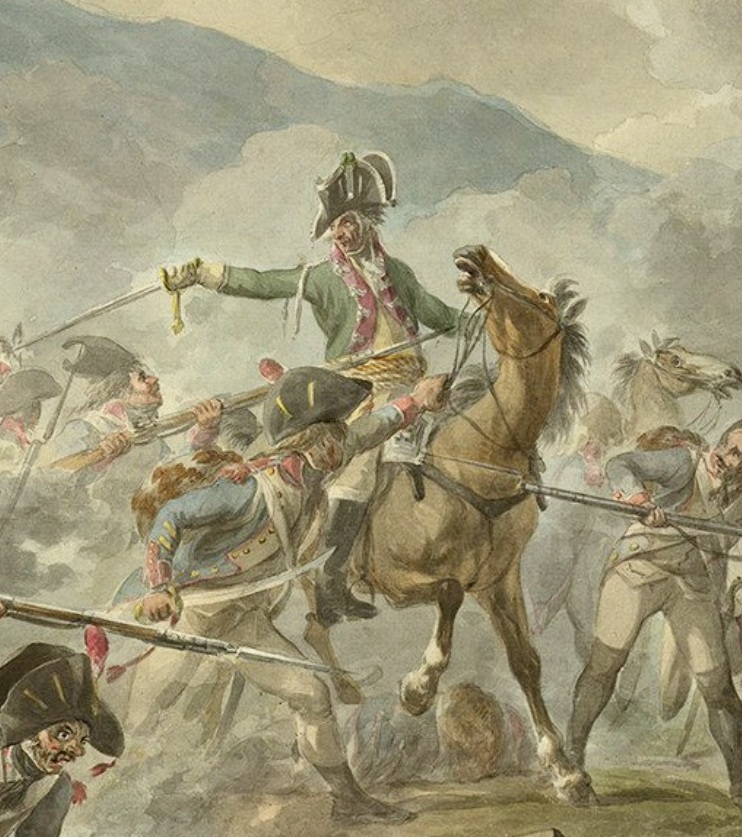
Fersen (mounted) being captured at the Battle of Bergen

General of the Infantry Johann Hermann von Fersen (Russian: Иван Иванович Герман фон Ферзен, romanized: Ivan Ivanovich German fon Ferzen; 1740 – 9 June 1801) was an Imperial Russian Army officer. Born in the Electorate of Saxony, he joined the Russian army in 1770.

== Life ==
He was involved in the battles at Larga and Kagul during the Russo-Turkish War of 1768–1774 and in the military operations against Yemelyan Pugachev. He won the battle in Upper Kuban against Seraskier Batal-Bey and his 18,000 Turks and 15,000 Highlanders, capturing Batal-Bey and his whole camp. In 1792 he was appointed quartermaster-general under Mikhaïl Kretchetnikov in Lithuania and in 1794 he commanded a special corps in Poland.

Under Paul I of Russia he served first as quartermaster-general then commanded the Russian contingent in the failed 1799 Anglo-Russian invasion of Holland. He was defeated at the Battle of Bergen and taken prisoner. Before news of his defeat reached Saint Petersburg, he had been promoted to General of the Infantry, but he was later excluded from service by Tsar Paul.

The captured Hermann was sent to the fortress of Lille. The French were ready to exchange him for all the French generals taken prisoner in Italy, but Paul I did not agree to this, and Herman remained in captivity until the conclusion of peace. Upon his return from captivity, Herman presented an explanation of his actions and on November 6, 1800, he was again allowed into the Russian army, but received no further appointments. These unfortunate events affected his health, and on 9 June 1801, he died in Saint Petersburg.

== Sources ==
- http://www.biografija.ru/show_bio.aspx?id=24220
- Russian Biographical Dictionary
