= Anapa campaign (1790) =

Russian military failed attack to capture fortress of Anapa

- Part of Sheikh Mansur Movement and Russo-Turkish War (1787–1792)
Date	10 February (Note: Russian army crosses the Kuban River) – 4 May (Note: Russian army arrive at Grigoriopolis) 1790
Location	Circassia and the Ottoman Empire (Modern–day Republic of Adygea and Krasnodar Krai, Russian Federation)
Result	North Caucasian–Ottoman victory; Heavy Russian casualties; Failure of the Russian army to capture Anapa

Belligerents
Sheikh Mansur Movement; Ottoman Empire	Russian Empire

Commanders and leaders
Sheikh Mansur; Kose Pasha; Hussein Pasha	(Russian Empire) Yuri Bibikov

Units involved
Unknown	Separate Caucasian Corps: 14 Infantry Battalions; 6 Dragoon Squadrons; 7 Cossack Regiments

Strength
15,000–48,000	7,609; 26 cannons

Casualties and losses
630 killed Unknown	2,202 killed
- The campaign costed the Russian Empire more than 52,000 rubles and ended in a serious Russian defeat. As a result, Yuri Bibikov, the commander of the Separate Caucasian Corps, was dismissed and replaced by Anton de Balmen, and the army which Bibikov led into Circassia was awarded a special silver medal on a blue ribbon, with the inscription: "For loyalty".

The Anapa campaign in the winter of 1790 was a military expedition launched by Russia to capture the fortress of Anapa. The expedition failed.

== Background ==
The fort of Anapa is located on Krasnodar Krai and facing the black sea and Crimea. In the past centuries, it was a trading post where Turks, Greeks, and Genoese people came to buy slaves from Circassia and Abkhazia. By the end of the 18th century, the fort became a battleground between the Ottomans, Russians, Circassians, Crimeans, and Nogai people due to its location. In 1787, the Ottoman Empire declared war on Russia. The Chechen leader, Sheikh Mansur, who was allied with the Ottomans at the time, took a position to defend Anapa from the Russian army.

== Campaign ==
In March 1790, Russia dispatched a military expedition to conquer the Ottoman fort of Anapa. The fort had a garrison of 15,000 men, led by Battal Hussein Pasha. The Russians were led by General Yuri Bibikov, who had a force of 12,000 men. Bibikov arrived at a village near the fort and attacked it; he also began attacking Circassian and Nogai tribes, defeating them. Pasha dispatched a force under Kose Mustasa Pasha to aid the tribes; however, he was defeated and forced back to the fort.

After his victory, Yuri attacked the fort of Anapa on March 24. The Russian troops did not have scaling ladders, horses, or food, and the hostile Caucasian population began attacking them. The Russian attack on the fort was also repulsed by heavy Ottoman artillery and attacks from the forces of Sheikh Mansur. As a result, the Russians called off the attack and withdrew. Yuri lost 5,000 men and 1,000 sick and wounded died 40 days later. The Russian Tsarina, Catherine the Great, dismissed Yuri, who was later sent for trial.

== See also ==
- Anapa campaign (1787) – first Russian campaign against Anapa
- Anapa campaign (1788) – second Russian campaign against Anapa

== Bibliography ==
- Мусаев, Алаудин (2007). Шейх Мансур [Sheikh Mansur] (in Russian). pp. 73–74.
- Oztas, Ahmet (2013). A Page from the History of the North Caucasus: Imam Mansur Ushurma. EHESS. pp. 1–14.
- Şahin, Mustafa (2017). Şahin, Büşra (ed.). Aşk Özgürlüktür Şeyh Şamil (in Turkish). YAYINEVİ. pp. 1–235. ISBN 9786058299702.
- Sergei R. Grinevetsky، Igor S. Zonn، Sergei S. Zhiltsov، Aleksey N. Kosarev، Andrey G. Kostianoy (2014), The Black Sea Encyclopedia.
- M. Sadık Bilge (2005), Osmanlı Devleti ve Kafkasya: Osmanlı varlığı döneminde Kafkasya'nın siyasî-askerî tarihi ve idarî taksimâtı, 1454-1829.
