= Urup (river) =

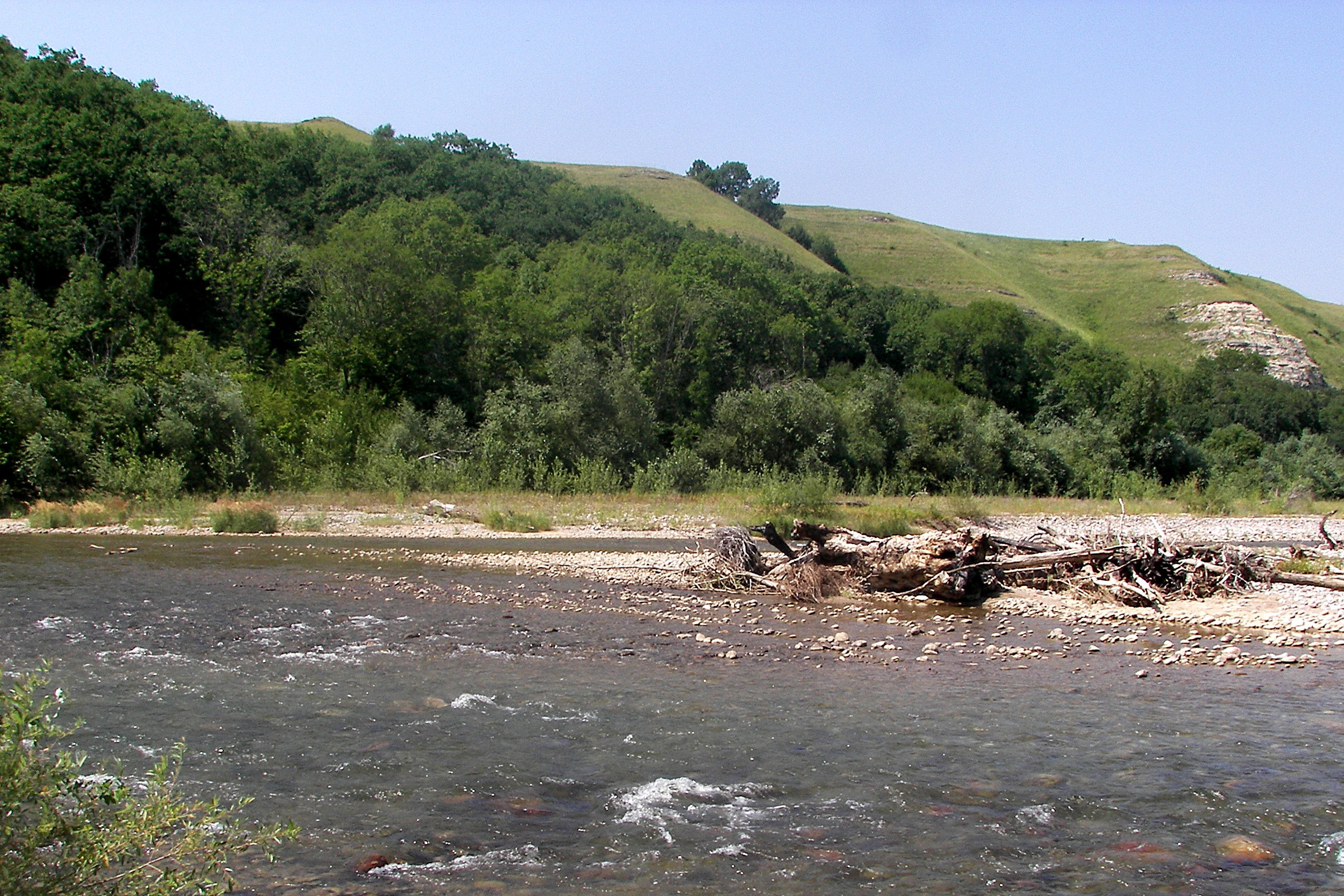

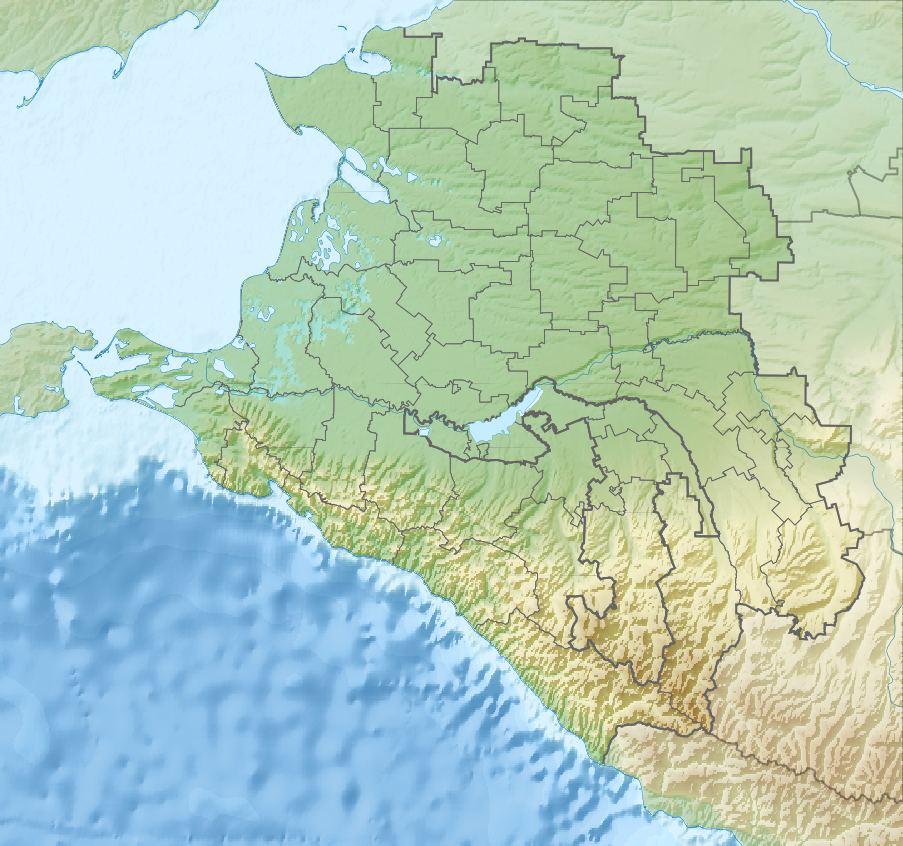
- Location within Krasnodar Krai Location within European Russia

Physical characteristics
- Mouth: Kuban
  - coordinates: 44°59′17″N 41°10′06″E
- Length: 231 km (144 mi)
- Basin size: 3,220 km^{2} (1,240 sq mi)

Basin features
- Progression: Kuban→ Sea of Azov

The Urup (Russian: Уруп) is a river in the North Caucasus. It is a left tributary of the Kuban, which it joins at Armavir. It is 231 kilometres (144 mi) long, and has a drainage basin of 3,220 square kilometres (1,240 sq mi).
