= Battle of Amir-Hajji-Yurt =

1825 Battle between the Russian Empire and the North Caucasians

- Part of Caucasian War, Insurgency in the North Caucasus (1825-1826)
- Map of the North Caucasian Imamate between approx. 29 May – 7 July along with the Locations of Bey-Bulats Campaign.
Date	19−20 July [O.S. 7–8 July] 1825 (2 Hours)
Location	Amir-Hajji-Yurt Fortress, North Caucasus Line, Russian Empire (Modern-day Hangish-Yurt, Gudermessky District, Chechnya) 43°24′47″N 46°14′14″E
Result	Major North Caucasian Victory: Destruction of the Fortress
Territorial changes	Rebel forces take control of the banks of the Sunzha River.; Kabardia, the Endirey Kumyks, Nadterechny Chechens and several other North Caucasian peoples join the rebellion.

Belligerents
(Chechnya) Caucasian Imamate	Russian Empire

Commanders and leaders
(Chechnya) Bey-Bulat Taymiev (Chechnya) Muhammad al-Quduqli (Chechnya) Dibir-Ali of Gumbet (Chechnya) Chanka Andalov	(Russian Empire) Captain Osipov † (Russian Empire) Second-Lieutenant Dimitriev (POW) 2 other Senior Officers

Units involved
Imamate Forces: Chechen Tribes: Kachkalyks; Michiks; Ichkerians; Aukhs; Other Clans from Greater Chechnya; 300 Mountain Dagestanis; 200 Cavalry; 100 Infantry; Aksay Kumyks	Fortress Garrison: 43rd Jaeger Regiment: 117; 3 Officers; 114 Lower ranks; Fortress Artillery: 26; 1 Officer; 25 Lower Ranks; 41st Jaeger Regiment: 24; Apsheron Regiment: 7; Kura Regiment: 7; 1 Licorne cannon

Strength
Total: 2,000+; 2 Columns: Bey-Bulat Taymiev; Muhammad al-Quduqli	181 (Note: According to other sources, the garrison was 155 strong, however, this is a misconception, as this excludes the 26-strong artillery team in the fortress.); 4 officers; 177 lower ranks; 1 Licorne cannon

Casualties and losses
Less	Total: 112 (Note: According to other sources, the entire garrison was either wiped out, drowned or were captured.); 84 KIA; 1 officer; 83 lower ranks; 14 WIA; 14 POW; 1 officer; 13 lower ranks; 1 Licorne cannon captured
- Approximate location of the Amir-Hajji-Yurt Fortress in modern-day Chechnya.

The Battle of the Amir-Hajji-Yurt Fortress (Note: Russian: Амир-Аджи-Юрт, romanized: Amir-Adji-Yurt; Often transliterated as Amir-Adzhi-Yurt; Sometimes also transliterated as Amīr-Hājjī-Yūrt or Ameer-Hadji-Yourt.) was a major battle between the Russian Empire and North Caucasian rebels led by Bey-Bulat Taymiev. During a night attack, the mountaineers stormed and captured the fortress, inflicted heavy casualties on the Russian garrison, and forced the remaining defenders to flee.

The battle was significant because it marked the first time that North Caucasian mountaineers successfully stormed and captured a Russian fortress during Alexey Yermolov. It also demonstrated to the Russian authorities the seriousness of the Caucasian Insurgency and the growing influence of Bey-Bulat Taymiev. The victory greatly raised rebel morale and helped the uprising spread further.

== Background ==
=== Amir-Hajji-Yurt ===
Map of the North-East sector of the North Caucasus Line. Amir-Hajji-Yurt can be seen on the Terek River.

Amir-Hajji-Yurt was established in 1820 as a small Russian redoubt on the Terek River, between the Cossack stanitsas of Shelkovskaya and Shchedrinskaya. It was constructed as part of the expansion of the Russian defensive line under General Aleksey Yermolov, primarily to protect a ferry crossing over the Terek. Its construction, together with several other fortifications in the region, was supervised by General Stahl.

In April 1821, the fortification was attacked by a large Chechen force. Its small garrison of 25 soldiers, commanded by non-commissioned officer Makhonin, successfully repelled the attack despite losing more than half its men, including Makhonin himself. In 1822, the garrison of the abandoned Neotstupny Stan fortification was transferred to Amir-Hajji-Yurt, where additional earthworks were hastily constructed.

Despite these improvements, Amir-Hajji-Yurt remained a relatively weak fortification. According to Russian military historian Vasily Potto, its defenses consisted primarily of a wattle fence surrounded by a shallow ditch that could easily be jumped across. By July 1825, its artillery consisted of a single defective quarter-pood Licorne cannon.

=== Unrest in the North Caucasus in the 1820s ===
In the 1820s, anti-Russian movements spread across the North Caucasus for several reasons. Punitive expeditions, the destruction of villages, heavy taxes, and the humiliating execution of local people under general Aleksey Yermolov led Muslim preachers, most notably Muhammad al-Yaraghi, Abd al-Qadir of Germenchuk, Muhammad al-Quduqli, and several others, to preach Gazavat. (Note: Russian: Газават, Chechen: Г1азот, romanized: Ghazovt, Arabic: غَزْوَة, romanized: Ghazwah, meaning raid or military expedition.) These preachers were supported by the famous Bey-Bulat Taymiev, the most influential leader in Chechnya at the time.

In 1821-1822, a major rebellion broke out in Chechnya, but it was suppressed by the Russian Empire. During the period leading up to the campaign in Chechnya in the spring of 1825, Russian forces destroyed several major villages in Chechnya. Over the following months, Chechen leaders and clergy began preparing for another uprising.

On 29 May 1825, a national congress of leaders from across the North Caucasus, including Chechnya, Ingushetia, Karabulak, Kabardia, Kumykia, and other regions, was held in Mayrtup. At the congress, a new rebellion was declared, Imam Muhammad al-Quduqli was elected Imam of the movement, and Bey-Bulat Taymiev was chosen as its military leader. Soon afterwards, fighters from across the North Caucasus began gathering in Mayrtup.

== Prelude ==
=== Gathering of the Rebel Forces ===
Messengers were sent throughout Chechnya, Ingushetia, and neighboring lands to announce the election of the new Imam. Chechnya and Ingushetia rose in rebellion, while the Aksay Kumyks appealed to Bey-Bulat to free them from Russian rule.

On 22 June, 200 Dagestani cavalry and 100 infantry under the Qadi of Gumbet, Dibir-Ali of Gumbet arrived in Ichkeria. After their arrival, Bey-Bulat sent messengers to the Michik Chechens, calling for one man from every household to join the uprising. The Michik Chechens answered the call, assembled, and marched toward Mayrtup. On the way, they were joined by Chechens from Ichkeria, Aukhs, Kachkalyks, and other clans of Greater Chechnya, bringing the total rebel force to more than 2,000 men.

=== Movement of the Rebel Forces ===
The rebels marched through Shali and occupied the village of Atagi. At this point, General Nikolay Grekov understood the seriousness of the situation. After gathering all available troops, he set out toward Atagi on 30 June to engage the rebels in battle. However, Bey-Bulat avoided a direct confrontation and withdrew to Goyty. There, he divided his army into two groups. One group, led by Imam Muhammad al-Quduqli, was sent east to encourage the Kumyks to join the rebellion, while Bey-Bulat himself went to the Karabulaks and Ingush people to raise support among them. Grekov's forces were too small to continue the pursuit, and he withdrew to Grozny.

Grekov understood the importance of keeping the Kumyks under Russian control. Their proximity to Dagestan, the possibility of receiving support from there, and the risk that the rebellion could spread throughout Dagestan led him to begin suppressing the uprising in Kumykia. Grekov also knew that the rebels threatened the fortresses of Amir-Hajji-Yurt, Pregradny Stan, and Gerzel-Aul. With a detachment of two companies of rangers, 30 Cossacks, and two guns, he arrived at Gerzel-Aul on 7 July. At 7 AM, he sent a message to Captain Osipov, commander of Amir-Hajji-Yurt, warning him of an expected rebel attack.

=== March and Skirmish at Aksay ===
On 7 July, Russian forces under Grekov reached Aksay after a forced march. Their sudden arrival temporarily calmed the situation in the town. Grekov gathered the Kumyk elders and urged them to remain loyal to the Russian state. A few accepted his appeal, but most left later that day for the insurgent camp located above Aksay.

Around noon, insurgent forces led by Dibir-Ali and Chanka Andalov descended from the mountains and exchanged fire with local inhabitants. Grekov moved into the valley to engage them, but the insurgents withdrew toward the Kachkalyk Ridge. Because his detachment was exhausted from the forced march, Grekov did not pursue them and remained at Aksay.

After withdrawing from the area around Aksay, the insurgents moved toward Amir-Hajji-Yurt, a small Russian fortification on the Terek River, about 25 versts from Aksay by the direct route. They then hid in the forest near the fortress.

=== Preparations for the Defense ===
Aware of the danger, Grekov sent Osipov an order to remain cautious. Later that evening, an inhabitant of Aksay delivered another note from Grekov, warning that large groups of Chechens were moving toward the post and would probably attack during the night.

Despite these warnings, Osipov did not take sufficient defensive measures. According to the account, after receiving the Order of St. Anne, 3rd Class with Bow, he showed little concern about a possible attack. When he received Grekov's final note, Osipov placed it under his pillow. After being questioned about the warning, he ordered preparations for an alarm but then dismissed the soldiers to their barracks. He also did not reinforce the usual night guard at the gate. His lack of precaution was also shown in the handling of the artillery park, which had been temporarily stored in the open under a canopy of dry boards while the cellar was being renovated. The garrison remained in the barracks and other quarters, with the soldiers expected to take their assigned positions only if an alarm was raised.

== Battle ==
=== Opposing Forces ===
==== Russian Side; The Amir-Hajji-Yurt Fortress and its Garrison ====
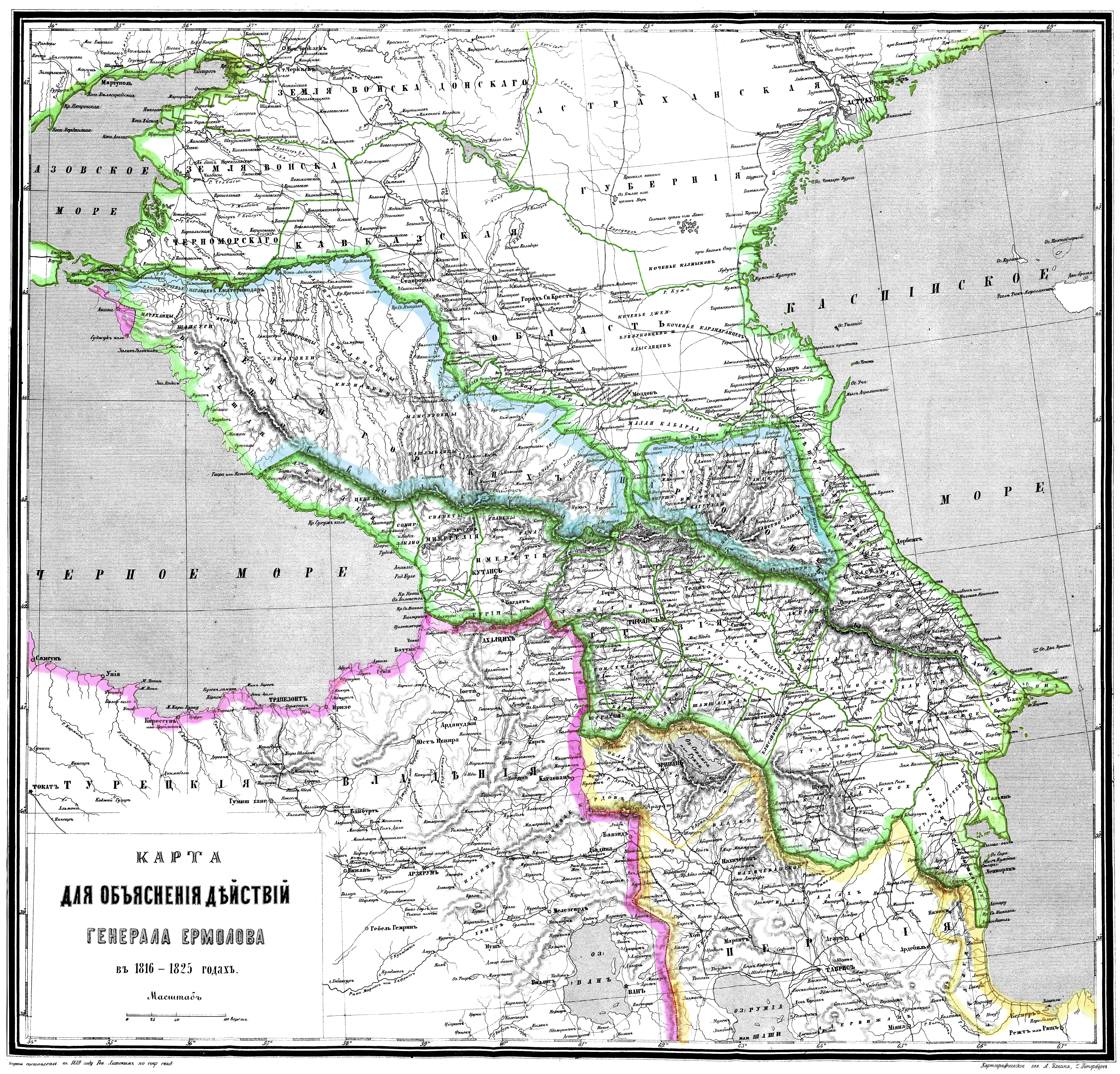
Map of the Caucasus during the time of Alexey Yermolov (1816-1825). Amir-Hajji-Yurt can be seen South of the Terek River, to the East of modern-day Braguny.

The Amir-Hajji-Yurt fortification was weakly constructed. It consisted mainly of a wattle fence surrounded by a ditch, which could reportedly be crossed or jumped over without much difficulty.

At the time of the attack, the Amir-Hajji-Yurt fortification had a garrison of 180 men under Captain Osipov of the 43rd Jäger Regiment.

- The force included:
  - 43rd Jaeger Regiment: 117 men
    - 3 senior officers (including captain Osipov)
    - 114 lower ranks
  - 41st Jaeger Regiment: 24 men
  - Apsheron Regiment: 7 men
  - Kura Regiment: 7 men
  - Garrison artillery: 26 men
    - 1 senior officer
    - 25 lower ranks

The fortification was also equipped with a damaged quarter-pood Licorne gun, while another artillery piece was stationed at the Terek crossing. Lisanevich and Grekov considered the garrison large enough to defend the small fortification.

Sources give slightly different figures for the strength of the Russian garrison. Some place it at 184 men, while others give a figure of 155. The lower figure appears to exclude the 26-man artillery detachment stationed in the fortress.

==== North Caucasian Side ====
The rebels numbered more than 2,000 men, and were divided into two columns, led by Bey-Bulat Taymiev and Imam Muhammad al-Quduqli.

=== Advance of the First Rebel Column ===
At dawn, the first rebel column, which had taken cover in the forest to the right of Amir-Hajji-Yurt, began advancing toward the fort. The darkness, strong wind, smoky sky, and tall grass helped conceal their movement. A few dozen sazhen from the fort, the rebels crouched down and began crawling toward the fortification through the tall grass.

=== Storming of the Fortress ===
At around 20 sazhen from the fortification, the rebels stood up and charged toward Amir-Hajji-Yurt without firing any shots or giving battle cries. The attack was so quiet that the sentries did not immediately realize that an assault had begun. The sentry on the rampart barely had time to fire before he was killed by the Chechens. Soon after, the wattle fence collapsed, and only then was the alarm raised. The rebels crossed the ditch and entered the fortress.

=== Battle inside the Fortress ===
The insurgents encountered little organized resistance inside the fortress. They entered the soldiers' barracks, which had been left open during the night, and began killing the sleeping soldiers. Other soldiers, still disoriented from sleep, emerged from the barracks one by one and were attacked by the rebels, who had already captured several rifles and surrounded the barracks.

=== Battle at the Exit Gate ===
The exit on the opposite side of the fortress was defended by around 10 men led by a Non-commissioned officer. They formed up and prepared to fire, but initially held their fire because it was difficult to distinguish Russian soldiers from the rebels in the confusion. Captain Osipov eventually joined them with a group of soldiers and opened rifle fire on the attackers. Soon afterwards, he managed to turn the Licorne gun toward the rebels and fired two rounds of grapeshot, causing them to scatter. However, the Russian soldiers were unable to take advantage of this moment. The garrison had become divided and lost its cohesion, making any late attempt at organized resistance ineffective.

=== Assault of the Second Column ===
After the fighting at the barracks, the second rebel column attacked the fortress from the left side. The insurgents entered the fortification and occupied the soldiers' dugouts and office quarters. They then began attacking a wooden shed that contained the garrison's stores, supplies, and property, as well as cast-iron cannons brought from the destroyed fortification of Neotstupny Stan. Several barrels of gunpowder were also stored there. The shed, or barn, caught fire, which quickly spread through the fortification. Soon, much of the fortress was burning. The fire allowed some Russian soldiers to escape, as it forced the attackers to gather in safer areas.

Eventually, the fire reached the gunpowder stored in the shed, causing a massive explosion. Buildings, ammunition boxes, gun carriages, cannons, and both Chechens and Russian soldiers gathered nearby were thrown across the surrounding area. The explosion was so powerful that some bodies were reportedly thrown across the Terek River.

=== Flight of the Russian Soldiers and the Death of Osipov ===
The only survivors of the explosion were the soldiers defending the exit gate alongside Osipov, who had by then been wounded by either a sabre or a gunshot, as well as other soldiers who had gathered there. Seeing that the fortress was lost and that further resistance was impossible, while hundreds of voices could be heard outside the fortification, suggesting another attack, Osipov decided that continuing the defense would be futile. He shouted to the remaining soldiers, “Save yourselves wherever you can,” and was the first to enter the river. The others, including the two remaining senior officers, followed him. Both officers and almost all of the soldiers gathered at the exit gate managed to escape, but Osipov drowned in the river.

== Aftermath ==
The battle lasted for 2 hours and as a result of the fighting, the fire and the explosion, the fortress of Amir-Hajji-Yurt was completely destroyed.

=== Casualties ===
==== Russian Casualties ====
Russian casualties were heavy. The commander of the fort, Captain Osipov, and 83 lower ranks were killed. The commander of the fortress artillery, Second Lieutenant Dimitriev, and 13 members of the artillery detachment were captured. Two officers and 81 lower ranks escaped, including 14 wounded men, bringing the total number of Russian casualties to 112. The rebels also captured the fort's only cannon. It was reported that on the following day, only 25 Russian bodies could be identified, while many of the remaining bodies were so badly mutilated that it was impossible to determine whether they were Russians or Chechens.

According to other sources, the garrison was either completely destroyed, drowned while attempting to escape, or captured.

==== North Caucasian Casualties ====
The number of casualties among the mountaineers is unknown, although the sources indicate that their losses were lower than those of the Russian garrison.

=== Significance and North Caucasian Reaction ===
The fall of Amir-Hajji-Yurt was significant because it marked the first time that North Caucasian forces successfully stormed and captured a Russian fort during Alexey Yermolovs reign. The victory also raised rebel morale and helped the uprising spread further. Within the next few days, the strength of the rebel army reportedly doubled from 2,000 to 4,000 men. The uprising then began to spread beyond the Terek River among the Nadterechny Chechens. Unrest also grew among the Endirey and Aksay Kumyks, as well as the Kachkalyks. In the west, the Karabulaks and Ingush were also "in motion". By this point, rebellion had spread across much of the North Caucasus, from the Black Sea in the west to the Caspian Sea in the east.

=== Russian Reaction ===
The Russian authorities were shocked and confused by the fall of Amir-Hajji-Yurt. General Grekov wrote to Yermolov: “I not only expected an attack on Amir-Hajji-Yurt, I was certain that the swindlers could carry it out in order to distract me from Gerzel-Aul, but I could never have imagined that the rebels would shake the fortification.”

“I was enraged,” Yermolov wrote in his notes, “by this incident, which arose solely from our own carelessness. Even more annoying was the fact that this success could strengthen the rebel faction, increasing the number of believers in the false prophet.”

According to N. A. Volkonsky, Grekov now realized that he was no longer dealing with "scum," but with an armed and powerful enemy. The "new doctrine," which he had previously dismissed as "religious nonsense," had developed into a "political stimulus" that was adopted "unanimously" by "the entire population of Greater and Lesser Chechnya."

Following the destruction of Amir-Hajji-Yurt, the Russian command began redistributing its limited forces along the left flank. On 9 July, Grekov ordered the evacuation of the post at Zlobny Okop, supplied Gerzel-Aul from Vnezapnaya and reinforced its garrison with a company of the 41st Jäger Regiment, while leaving another company at Vnezapnaya. He then marched toward Groznaya through Kargalinskaya with about 120 infantry and roughly the same number of Cossacks; 250 men of the 41st and 130 of the 43rd Jäger Regiment, several Cossacks and twelve guns remained at Gerzel-Aul.

=== Further Campaigns ===
Following the destruction of Amir-Hajji-Yurt, the insurgent forces, taking advantage of the Russian inactivity on the Sunzha Line and wanting to keep their success going, attacked the Pregradny Stan fortress, where they burnt down part of the fort, capturing several people along with 2 Licorne cannons.

The insurgents reportedly considered advancing toward Groznaya, but rumors of Grekov's approach prevented them from doing so.

The rebel forces later besieged Gerzel-Aul, but failed to capture the fortress and dispersed after Russian reinforcements arrived. The Gerzel-Aul Massacre followed soon afterwards.

== See also ==
- Bey-Bulat Taymiev — Leader of the rebel forces.
- Muhammad al-Quduqli — Leader of the rebel forces.
- Siege of the Evil Trench Fortress — Previous major battle of the war.
- Battle of Pregradny Stan — Next major battle of the war.

== Sources ==
=== Bibliography ===
==== Historical Works ====
===== Russian =====
- Волконский, Н. А. (1886). "Глава III" [Chapter 3]. In Чернявский, И. С. (ed.). Война на Восточном Кавказе с 1824 по 1834 г. в связи с мюридизмом [The War in the Eastern Caucasus from 1824 to 1834 in Connection with Muridism]. Кавказский сборник (in Russian). Vol. 10. Тифлис: Типография Окружного штаба Кавказского военного округа. pp. 97–143 – via DrevLit.
- Потто, В. А. (1887). "IX. Чеченский мятеж." [9. Chechen Rebellion.]. Кавказская война в отдельных очерках, эпизодах, легендах и биографиях [The Caucasian War in Separate Essays, Episodes, Legends and Biographies] (in Russian). Vol. 2: Ермоловское время (2nd ed.). Санкт-Петербург: Издание книжного склада В. А. Березовского. pp. 143–153 – via VosLit.
- Сахно-Устимович, П. М. (2006) [19th century]. Миловидов, Б. П. (ed.). "Описание чеченского похода 1826 г." [Description of the Chechen Campaign of 1826]. Звезда (in Russian) (10): 145–179 – via VosLit.

===== English =====
- Baddeley, John F. (1908). "Chapter IX: 1820–1825". The Russian Conquest of the Caucasus (PDF). London, New York, Bombay, Calcutta: Longmands, Green and Co. pp. 135–151. LCCN 09002520. OCLC 4470030. OL 7004549M – via Internet Archive.

==== Modern Scholarship ====
===== Russian sources =====
- Ахмадов, Я. З.; Хасмагомадов, Э. Х. (2005). "Глава II. Чечня в первой трети XIX века. Взаимоотношения с Российской империей" [Chapter 2. Chechnya in the first third of the 19th century. Relations with the Russian Empire]. История Чечни в XIX-XX веках [History of Chechnya in the 19th-20th Centuries]. История Чечни с древнейших времен до конца XVIII века (in Russian). Москва: Пульс. pp. 40–122. ISBN 5-93486-046-1 – via eLIBRARY.RU.
- Гапуров, Ш. А.; Товсултанов, Р. А. (2019). "Глава 3. Народное восстание в Чечне в 1825-1826 гг. под руководством Бей-Булата Таймиева" [Chapter 3. The national uprising in Chechnya in 1825–1826 led by Bey-Bulat Taimiev]. In Магамадов, С. С. (ed.). Бей-Булат Таймиев и его время (Российско-чеченские отношения в первой трети XIX века) [Bey-Bulat Taimiev and His Time (Russian-Chechen Relations in the First Third of the 19th Century)] (in Russian). Грозный: АО «Издательско-полиграфический комплекс „Грозненский рабочий“». pp. 293–371. ISBN 978-5-4314-0391-0. OCLC 1143826539 – via Bavarian State Library.
- Хожаев, Д. А. (1998). "Тайми Биболт" [Taymi Bibolt]. In Мазаева, Тамара (ed.). Чеченцы в Русско-Кавказской войне [Chechens in the Russo-Caucasian War] (in Russian). Грозный–Санкт-Петербург: Седа. pp. 45–59. ISBN 5-85973-012-8. Archived from the original on 22 December 2014.
- Тесаев, З. А. (2020). "Таймиев Бей-Булат (1779–1831)" [Taymiev Bey-Bulat (1779–1831)] (PDF). In Гапуров, Ш. А.; Магамадов, С. С. (eds.). Исторические личности Чечни (XI–XXI вв.) [Historical Personalities of Chechnya (11th–21st Centuries)] (PDF) (in Russian). Vol. 1, Book 1: Political and Public Figures. Грозный: АО «Издательско-полиграфический комплекс „Грозненский рабочий“». pp. 169–176. ISBN 978-5-4314-0422-1 – via eLIBRARY.RU.

===== English =====
- Anchabadze, George (2009). "The Chechens and Ingush in the Caucasian War". In Gelashvili, N. (ed.). The Vainakhs (PDF). Translated by Paichadze, T. (2nd ed.). Tbilisi: Caucasian House. pp. 53–64. OCLC 587764752. OL 28289915M – via Ilia State University.
- Gammer, Moshe (1994). "Chapter 4: Ermolov". Muslim Resistance to the Tsar: Shamil and the Conquest of Chechnia and Daghestan. London; Portland, Oregon: Frank Cass. pp. 29–38. ISBN 0-7146-3431-X. LCCN 91023436. OCLC 24067184. OL 1544359M – via Open Library.

==== Articles ====
- Gelaeva, Zara Alaudinovna; Kindarova, Yaha Abdullaevna; Mukaeva, Taisa Shamzatovna (2024). "The Revolt of 1825 in Chechnya Led by Beibulat Taimiev". In Bataev, Dena Karim-Sultanovich; Gapurov, Shakhrudin Aidievich; Osmaev, Abbaz Dogievich; Akaev, Vakhit Khumaidovich; Idigova, Lalita Musaevna; Ovhadov, Musa Rukmanovich; Salgiriev, Ali Ruslanovich; Betilmerzaeva, Maret Muslamovna (eds.). Social and Cultural Transformations in the Context of Modern Globalism – SCTCMG 2023. International Scientific Conference "Social and Cultural Transformations in the Context of Modern Globalism" (SCTCMG 2023). European Proceedings of Social and Behavioural Sciences. Vol. 134. London: European Publisher. pp. 178–185. doi:10.15405/epsbs.2024.10.22. ISBN 978-1-80296-133-1. ISSN 2357-1330.

==== Websites ====
- "Кампания на Северном Кавказе 1825 г." [Campaign in the North Caucasus in 1825 CE]. Руниверс (in Russian).
  - "Чеченский поход (экспедиция в аулы Гойту, Урус-Мартан, Гехи)" [Chechen Campaign (expedition to the villages of Goytu, Urus-Martan, and Gekhi)]. Руниверс (in Russian).
  - "Бой у Амир-Аджи-Юртовского укрепления" [Battle at the Amir-Hajji-Yurt Fortification]. Руниверс (in Russian).
