= Battle of Pregradny Stan =

1825 Military Conflict between the Russian Empire and the North Caucasians

- Part of Caucasian War, Insurgency in the North Caucasus (1825-1826)
- Map of the North Caucasian Imamate between approx. 29 May – 7 July along with the Locations of Bey-Bulats Campaign.
Date	Sometime between 8–11 July 1825
Location	Pregradny Stan Fortress, Sunzha Line, Russian Empire (Modern-day Sernovodskoye, Sernovodsky District, Chechnya) 43.312924°N 45.183219°E
Result	North Caucasian Victory

Belligerents
(Chechnya) North Caucasian Imamate	Russian Empire

Commanders and leaders
(Chechnya) Bey-Bulat Taymiev	Unknown

Units involved
North Caucasian fighters	Fortress Garrison: Vladikavkaz Garrison Regiment; 1–2 Infantry Companies; 100 Cossacks; 19th Artillery Brigade; 2 Licornes

Strength
2,000–3,000	1–2 infantry Companies; 100 Cossacks 2 Licornes

Casualties and losses
Unknown	Unknown; Several POW; 2 Licorne cannons captured
- Approximate location of the Pregradny Stan fortress in modern-day Chechnya.

The Battle of Pregradny Stan (Note: Russian: Преградный Стан, romanized: Pregradny Stan, lit. 'Barrier Camp') was an attack on the Pregradny Stan Fortress by North Caucasian rebels led by Bey-Bulat Taymiev during the 1825-1826 Insurgency in the North Caucasus. The rebels burnt part of the fortress down, captured several people and 2 Licorne cannons before retreating.

== Pregradny Stan ==
Map of the North-East sector of the North Caucasus Line. Pregradny Stan can be seen on the Sunzha River.

Pregradny Stan was a small redoubt built in 1817 under Major General Ivan Delpozzo on Yermolov's orders, near Kazakh-Kichu on the Sunzha River. Its initial garrison comprised one to two companies of the Vladikavkaz Garrison Regiment, 100 Cossacks, and two cannons. The fort lacked an internal water supply: the Sunzha lay approximately 530 metres from its perimeter and 810 metres from its gate. To protect soldiers collecting water, the forest across the river was cleared to cannon-shot distance.

== Background ==
After a national congress in Chechnya declared a new uprising under the leadership of Muhammad al-Quduqli and Bey-Bulat Taymiev in late May 1825, rebellion spread across parts of the North Caucasus. The rebels achieved an early success in late June, when they captured the Evil Trench Fortress after a week-long siege.
Around the same time, Taymiev led the main rebel force from Mayrtup through Shali to Atagi, which they occupied. In response, General Nikolay Grekov advanced to confront them, but the rebels avoided a direct engagement and withdrew to Goyty. From there, part of the force moved toward the Karabulaks. On 7 July, the rebels, now numbering 2,000 men, launched a surprise attack on the Amir-Hajji-Yurt fortress, capturing and destroying the fortification. (Note: See Battle of Amir-Hajji-Yurt.)

== Battle and Aftermath ==
Taking advantage of Grekov's absence from the Sunzha area, the weakened state of the Groznaya garrison, and their recent successes, a force under Bey-Bulat Taymiev attacked the fortress of Pregradny Stan, while the main army under Muhammad al-Quduqli advanced towards the Gerzel-Aul Fortress, which they besieged on 9 July. They burned several buildings, captured a number of prisoners and two Licorne cannons, and then withdrew.

Following the attack, the rebel forces moved downstream with the apparent intention of advancing on Groznaya. After receiving reports of their movement, Nikolay Grekov marched from Gerzel-Aul toward Groznaya with his troops, which allowed the main rebel army, by now 3,000 strong, under Imam Muhammad al-Quduqli to besiege Gerzel-Aul. Taymiev then changed direction and took up positions near Umakhan-Yurt. Another part of the rebel force, led by Imam Muhammad al-Quduqli, was operating in the same area and was launching constant attacks on the Gerzel-Aul fortress and threatened the strategically important redoubt at Stary-Yurt, which could have disrupted communications between the Sunzha and Aksay lines. On 11 July, Taymievs forces joined Muhammad al-Quduqli's siege of the siege of Gerzel-Aul.

== See also ==
- Bey-Bulat Taymiev — Leader of the rebel forces.
- Battle of Amir-Hajji-Yurt — Previous major battle of the war.
- Siege of Gerzel-Aul — Next major battle of the war.

== Sources ==
=== Bibliography ===
==== Historical Works ====
- Потто, В. А. (1887a). "V. Грозная.." [5. Groznaya.]. Кавказская война в отдельных очерках, эпизодах, легендах и биографиях [The Caucasian War in Separate Essays, Episodes, Legends and Biographies] (in Russian). Vol. 2: Ермоловское время (2nd ed.). Санкт-Петербург: Издание книжного склада В. А. Березовского. pp. 143–153 – via VosLit.
- Потто, В. А. (1887b). "IX. Чеченский мятеж." [9. Chechen Rebellion.]. Кавказская война в отдельных очерках, эпизодах, легендах и биографиях [The Caucasian War in Separate Essays, Episodes, Legends and Biographies] (in Russian). Vol. 2: Ермоловское время (2nd ed.). Санкт-Петербург: Издание книжного склада В. А. Березовского. pp. 143–153 – via VosLit.

==== Modern Scholarship ====
- Ахмадов, Я. З.; Хасмагомадов, Э. Х. (2005). "Глава II. Чечня в первой трети XIX века. Взаимоотношения с Российской империей" [Chapter 2. Chechnya in the first third of the 19th century. Relations with the Russian Empire]. История Чечни в XIX-XX веках [History of Chechnya in the 19th-20th Centuries]. История Чечни с древнейших времен до конца XVIII века (in Russian). Москва: Пульс. pp. 40–122. ISBN 5-93486-046-1 – via eLIBRARY.RU.
- Гапуров, Ш. А.; Товсултанов, Р. А. (2019). "Глава 3. Народное восстание в Чечне в 1825-1826 гг. под руководством Бей-Булата Таймиева" [Chapter 3. The national uprising in Chechnya in 1825–1826 led by Bey-Bulat Taimiev]. In Магамадов, С. С. (ed.). Бей-Булат Таймиев и его время (Российско-чеченские отношения в первой трети XIX века) [Bey-Bulat Taimiev and His Time (Russian-Chechen Relations in the First Third of the 19th Century)] (in Russian). Грозный: АО «Издательско-полиграфический комплекс „Грозненский рабочий“». pp. 293–371. ISBN 978-5-4314-0391-0. OCLC 1143826539 – via Bavarian State Library.
- Клычников, Ю. Ю. (1998). Деятельность А. П. Ермолова на Северном Кавказе (1816–1827) (PDF) (Candidate of Historical Sciences dissertation) (in Russian). Армавир: Армавирский государственный педагогический институт.
- Хожаев, Д. А. (1998). "Тайми Биболт" [Taymi Bibolt]. In Мазаева, Тамара (ed.). Чеченцы в Русско-Кавказской войне [Chechens in the Russo-Caucasian War] (in Russian). Грозный–Санкт-Петербург: Седа. pp. 45–59. ISBN 5-85973-012-8. Archived from the original on 22 December 2014.
- Тесаев, З. А. (2020). "Таймиев Бей-Булат (1779–1831)" [Taymiev Bey-Bulat (1779–1831)] (PDF). In Гапуров, Ш. А.; Магамадов, С. С. (eds.). Исторические личности Чечни (XI–XXI вв.) [Historical Personalities of Chechnya (11th–21st Centuries)] (PDF) (in Russian). Vol. 1, Book 1: Political and Public Figures. Грозный: АО «Издательско-полиграфический комплекс „Грозненский рабочий“». pp. 169–176. ISBN 978-5-4314-0422-1 – via eLIBRARY.RU.

==== Articles ====
- Gelaeva, Zara Alaudinovna; Kindarova, Yaha Abdullaevna; Mukaeva, Taisa Shamzatovna (2024). "The Revolt of 1825 in Chechnya Led by Beibulat Taimiev". In Bataev, Dena Karim-Sultanovich; Gapurov, Shakhrudin Aidievich; Osmaev, Abbaz Dogievich; Akaev, Vakhit Khumaidovich; Idigova, Lalita Musaevna; Ovhadov, Musa Rukmanovich; Salgiriev, Ali Ruslanovich; Betilmerzaeva, Maret Muslamovna (eds.). Social and Cultural Transformations in the Context of Modern Globalism – SCTCMG 2023. International Scientific Conference "Social and Cultural Transformations in the Context of Modern Globalism" (SCTCMG 2023). European Proceedings of Social and Behavioural Sciences. Vol. 134. London: European Publisher. pp. 178–185. doi:10.15405/epsbs.2024.10.22. ISBN 978-1-80296-133-1. ISSN 2357-1330.
