= Kachkalyk Expedition (1803) =

1803 Russian Expedition in Chechnya

- Part of the Caucasian War
- Map of the Kachkalykov society of Chechnya and 6 of its major villages in the year 1800. Isti-Su and Naim-Berdy, the main locations of the expedition, can be seen in the modern Gudermessky District.
Date	5−7 July [O.S. 23−25 June] 1803
Location	Kachkalyk, Chechnya (Modern-day Gudermessky District and Kurchaloyevsky District, Chechnya) 43°15′37″N 46°12′44″E
Result	Russian Victory: 2 peaceful Chechen villages devastated; 10,000 rubles worth of lifestock seized

Belligerents
Kachkalyks	Russian Empire; Cossacks

Commanders and leaders
Unknown	(Russian Empire) Vasily Shepelev

Units involved
Kachkalyk Fighters	North Caucasus Line; Saratov Musketeer Regiment; 15th Jäger Regiment; Several Companies of the Kizlyar Garrison; 5 Dragoon Squadrons; Greben Cossacks; Terek Cossacks; Semeyniye Cossacks; 2 cannons

Strength
Up to 1,000	1,200 2 cannons

Casualties and losses
Russian Reports: 10; 9 KIA; 1 POW; Material losses: ~10,000 rubles worth of lifestock seized; 960 cattle; 127 buffaloes; 24 horses	Russian reports: 0
- Most of the profit made from the captured lifestock was used to ransom Colonel Ivan Delpozzo, who was captured by Chechen Abreks the year before.
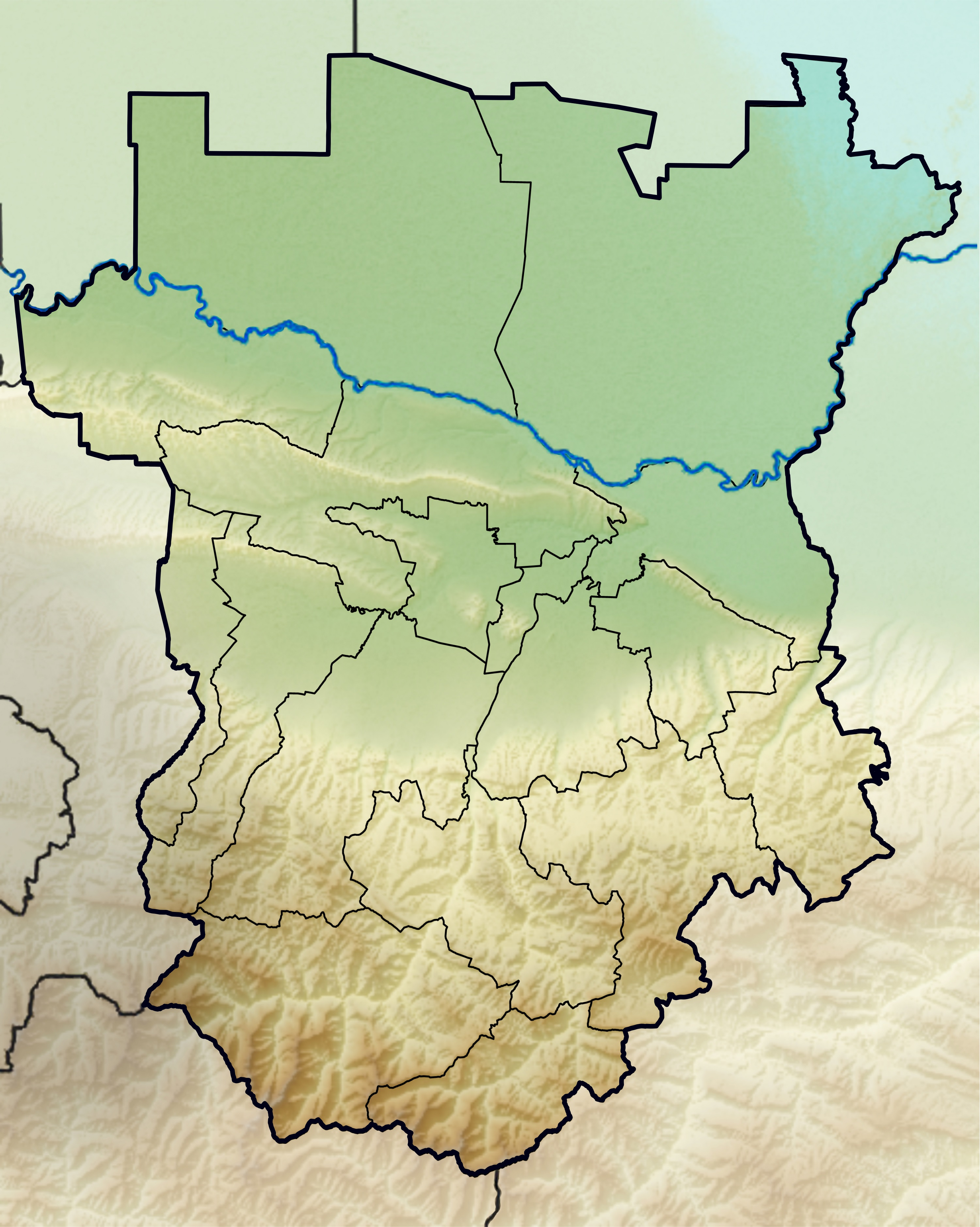
- Location of the Kachkalyk Ridge in modern-day Chechnya.

The Kachkalyk Expedition was a Russian military expedition conducted against the Kachkalyks (Note: The Kachkalyks were a historical Chechen society that inhabited the Kachkalyk Ridge in modern-day Chechnya.) in the summer of 1803. Its main objectives were to punish the Chechens for the capture of Colonel Ivan Delpozzo the previous year and to seize livestock from the local population to secure his release through ransom.

The expedition was successful, as the Chechen forces were caught by surprise and offered little resistance. Russian troops seized cattle, buffaloes, and horses valued at approximately 10,000 rubles. The proceeds from the captured livestock were subsequently used to pay the ransom for Ivan Delpozzo.

== Background ==
Following the suppression of Sheikh Mansur's uprising, the eastern section of the Caucasian Line experienced a period of relative peace. However, by the end of the eighteenth century, hostilities between Cossack detachments and Chechen communities had resumed. These clashes included small-scale raids, livestock seizures, and punitive expeditions. In 1799, a detachment of Greben Cossacks under Major Zachotov raided Isti-Su, (Note: Modern-day Melchkhi, Gudermessky District, Chechnya. Historically also referred to as Goryachenskaya.) seizing livestock and capturing two Chechens along with their horses.

In late 1802, Pavel Tsitsianov was appointed commander-in-chief of the Russian forces in the Caucasus. One of the first issues he faced was the capture of Colonel Ivan Delpozzo, who had been taken prisoner on 27 September 1802 by a group of Chechen Abreks led by Bey-Bulat Taymiev.

=== Capture of Ivan Delpozzo ===
On 27 September 1802, Colonel Ivan Delpozzo, who would later become commander of the North Caucasus Line, was travelling to Paraboch accompanied by three Greben Cossacks when his party was ambushed by 20 Chechen Abreks led by Bey-Bulat Taymiev. All three Cossacks were killed, while Delpozzo was captured and taken to Germenchuk, where his captors demanded a ransom of 20,000 silver rubles for his release.

=== Negotiations for the Release of Ivan Delpozzo ===
A translator named Alikhanov, who had extensive family connections and influential contacts in Chechnya, was appointed to negotiate Delpozzo's release. Alikhanov travelled to Germenchuk, where he negotiated with the Abreks and succeeded in reducing the ransom to 4,200 silver rubles. However, Russian authorities feared that the Abreks might accept the payment but refuse to release Delpozzo, instead taking the person delivering the money captive.

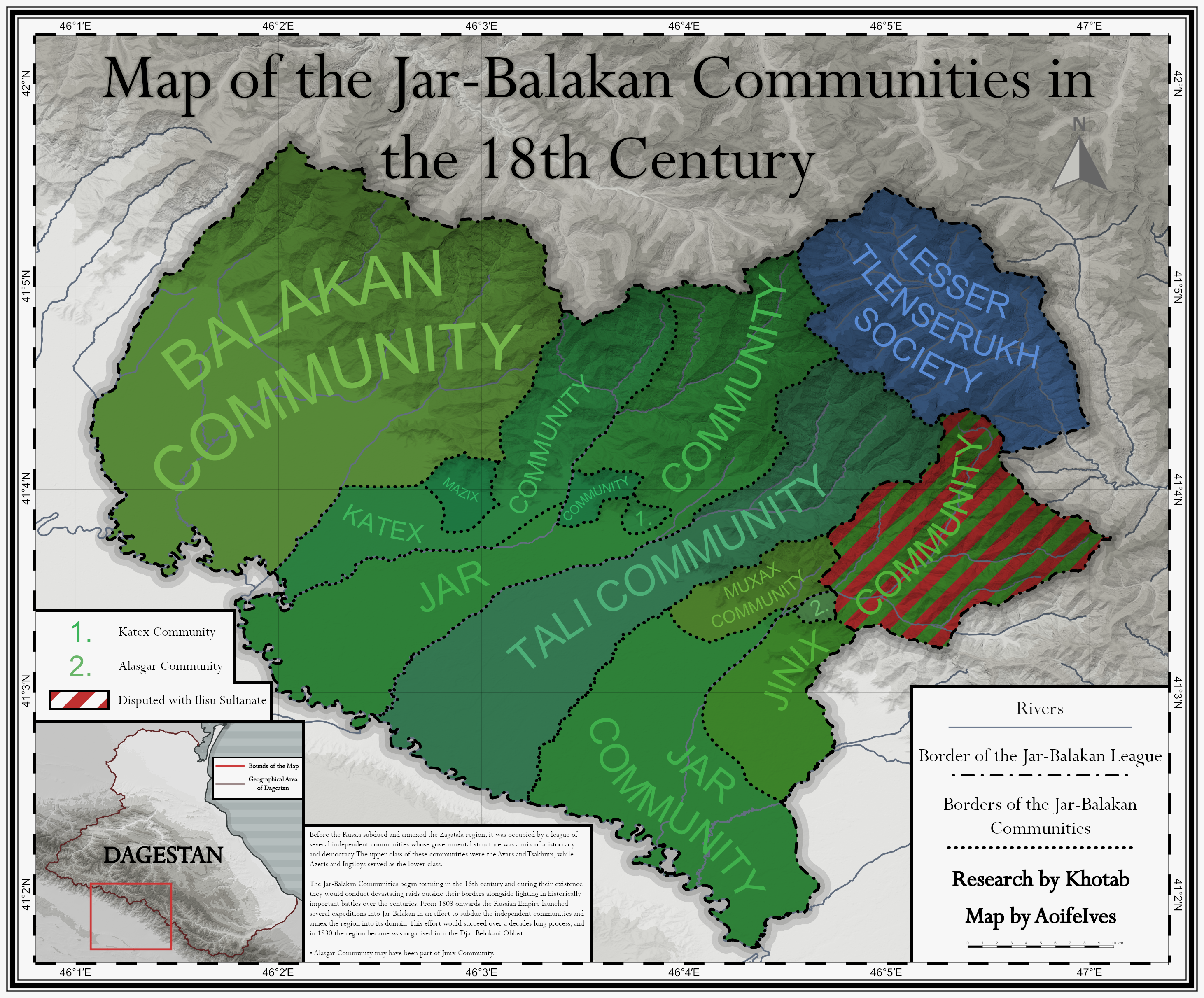
Map of the Jar-Balakan communities in the 18th century.

Following these negotiations, Russian authorities under Pavel Tsitsianov ordered the Jar-Balakan communities to secure Delpozzo's release. The Russian Empire had recently suppressed an uprising by the Jar-Balakan people and threatened to sell all Jar-Balakan prisoners of war if they failed to secure his freedom. In return, Russian authorities promised to release between 60 and 100 Jar-Balakan captives if they succeeded.

Meanwhile, Tsitsianov ordered Vasily Shepelev, commander of the North Caucasus Line, to carry out a punitive operation against the villages through which Delpozzo's captors had passed.

== Prelude ==
=== Tsitsianov's orders ===
In the summer of 1803, Pavel Tsitsianov ordered General Vasily Shepelev, commander of the troops stationed along the Caucasian Line, to organize a military expedition into Chechnya. The operation aimed to punish Chechen communities by seizing their livestock and destroying their grain crops.

Tsitsianov instructed Shepelev to act "without wasting any time, to punish them by depriving them of grain, as the most severe of all punishments."

Beyond conventional military operations, Tsitsianov introduced a strategy aimed at weakening Chechen resistance by systematically destroying crops and seizing livestock. Rather than relying solely on direct military engagements, this approach sought to deprive Chechen communities of their food supplies and means of survival, eventually forcing them into submission through starvation. According to the cited sources, this was the first systematic use of such a strategy in the conflict. Similar methods were later employed by Alexey Yermolov during his command of Russian forces in the Caucasus.

However, General Shepelev expressed concerns that attacking peaceful Chechen villages uninvolved in the raids would worsen relations with the Russian Empire, increase hostility toward Russian authorities, and undermine efforts at reconciliation. He also recognized that many Chechen communities living near the Terek River maintained peaceful relations with Russia and should not be held responsible for attacks committed by others. This differed from Tsitsianov's approach, which made little distinction between peaceful and hostile Chechen communities. On 15 June 1803, Shepelev wrote to Tsitsianov:

"Having received Your Excellency's notification... about the Chechens being deprived of their permanent bread... I am holding back from sending a detachment there only because I do not know whether to differentiate these people into peaceful and non-peaceful... I ask your permission as to how I should proceed in such a case, so as not to make a mistake and punish some instead of others..."

Tsitsianov responded by ordering that peaceful Chechen villages be given ten days to secure Delpozzo's release. Those that failed to comply would be treated as hostile:

"The peaceful Chechen villages, which almost always guide the non-peaceful and even harbor them, are to be informed that within 10 days they are to release and present to him the lost Colonel Delpozzo, and if they do not comply, they are to be treated as non-peaceful."

=== Russian preparations ===
Following Tsitsianov's orders, Shepelev assembled a military detachment from several units stationed along the Caucasian Line. The force consisted of troops from the Saratov Musketeer Regiment, the 15th Jäger Regiment, several companies of the Kizlyar garrison, and five squadrons of dragoons. Additional cavalry was provided by the Greben, Semeyniye, and Mozdok Cossacks.

In total, the Russian force numbered approximately 1,200 men, supported by two cannons. The troops assembled near Shchedrinskaya before crossing the Terek River on 23 June 1803.

== Expedition ==
The Russian force departed from Shchedrinskaya and crossed the Terek River during the night of 23 June 1803. The operation was planned as a surprise attack to prevent the Chechens from gathering a large force and organizing effective resistance. After crossing the river, Russian troops concealed themselves in difficult terrain and monitored the movements of local livestock.

After locating the livestock, the Cossacks were sent to seize the animals and drive them across the Terek on 25 June. Meanwhile, the main Russian force advanced against the nearby Chechen villages of Isti-Su and Naim-Berdy, (Note: Usually located near modern-day Oyskhara.) two of the six Kachkalyk villages considered loyal to the Russian Empire and reportedly uninvolved in the capture of Ivan Delpozzo.

Up to 1,000 Kachkalyk Chechens from neighboring villages gathered to assist the inhabitants and advanced against the Cossacks, but were met with artillery and rifle fire. Caught by surprise, the Chechen fighters were unable to organize effective resistance, and the encounter resulted in a brief exchange of fire.

After trampling the grain crops and seizing the livestock, the Russian detachment withdrew across the Terek River, completing the operation on the same day.

== Aftermath ==
=== Casualties and fate of Isti-Su and Naim-Berdy ===
On 11 August 1803, Shepelev submitted a report to Tsitsianov detailing the results of the expedition. According to his report, nine Chechens were killed and one was captured during the brief exchange of fire, while the Russian force "suffered no damage".

Russian troops seized 960 cattle, 127 buffaloes, and 24 horses from the Kachkalyks, while also destroying their grain crops. The captured livestock was subsequently sold for approximately 10,000 silver rubles.

Having lost much of their food supply and means of livelihood, the inhabitants of Isti-Su and Naim-Berdy began carrying out raids against the Caucasian Line.

=== Release of Ivan Delpozzo ===
Of the proceeds from the sale of the captured livestock, 8,400 rubles, twice the previously agreed ransom, were allocated to secure Ivan Delpozzo's release. The negotiator Alikhanov travelled to Germenchuk to deliver the payment, and Delpozzo was released in 1804 after more than a year in captivity.

Following his release, Delpozzo returned to Russian military service with the rank of major general and was appointed bailiff of the Kabardian people. He later served as commander of the North Caucasus Line from 1814 to 1818.

=== Further Russian operations and situation in Chechnya ===
Later in 1803, Russian troops under Major Savelyev carried out two additional punitive expeditions into Chechnya. These operations contributed to a further deterioration of relations between Chechen communities and the Russian Empire, accompanied by an increase in Chechen raids against the Caucasian Line.

Small groups of Chechen fighters crossed the fortified line and attacked Cossack patrols, pickets, and military outposts. For example, on 31 May 1803, Chechen fighters captured four Cossacks near the Chasovensky outpost. In late July of the same year, a combined group of Chechens and Ingush also attacked the fortress of Vladikavkaz.

Russian military historian Vasily Potto described this period of increased raids and small-scale fighting as a "Bandit War", reflecting the growing tensions between the Russian Empire and the North Caucasian highlanders.

== See also ==
- Paraboch Ambush — Capture of Ivan Delpozzo by Chechen Abreks.

== Sources ==
=== Bibliography ===
==== Historical Works ====
- Потто, В. А. (1887). "LII. Генерал Дельпоццо" [52. General Delpozzo]. Кавказская война в отдельных очерках, эпизодах, легендах и биографиях [The Caucasian War in Separate Essays, Episodes, Legends and Biographies] (in Russian). Vol. 1: От древнейших времен до Ермолова (2nd ed.). Санкт-Петербург: Издание книжного склада В. А. Березовского; Типография Е. А. Евдокимова. pp. 688–696 – via Восточная литература.

==== Modern Scholarship ====
- Ахмадов, Я. З.; Хасмагомадов, Э. Х. (2005). "Глава II. Чечня в первой трети XIX века. Взаимоотношения с Российской империей" [Chapter 2. Chechnya in the first third of the 19th century. Relations with the Russian Empire]. История Чечни в XIX-XX веках [History of Chechnya in the 19th-20th Centuries]. История Чечни с древнейших времен до конца XVIII века (in Russian). Москва: Пульс. pp. 77–121. ISBN 5-93486-046-1 – via eLIBRARY.RU.
- Гапуров, Ш. А.; Товсултанов, Р. А. (2019). "Глава 1. Чечня в начале XIX века. Начало военно-политической деятельности Бей-Булата Таймиева" [Chapter 1. Chechnya at the beginning of the 19th century. The beginning of the military-political activities of Bey-Bulat Taymiev]. In Магамадов, С. С. (ed.). Бей-Булат Таймиев и его время (Российско-чеченские отношения в первой трети XIX века) [Bey-Bulat Taimiev and His Time (Russian-Chechen Relations in the First Third of the 19th Century)] (in Russian). Грозный: АО «Издательско-полиграфический комплекс „Грозненский рабочий“». pp. 33–156. ISBN 978-5-4314-0391-0. OCLC 1143826539 – via Bavarian State Library.
- Хожаев, Д. А. (1998). "Тайми Биболт" [Taymi Bibolt]. In Мазаева, Тамара (ed.). Чеченцы в Русско-Кавказской войне [Chechens in the Russo-Caucasian War] (in Russian). Грозный–Санкт-Петербург: Седа. pp. 45–59. ISBN 5-85973-012-8 – via Internet Archive.

==== Articles ====
- Гапуров, Ш. А.; Товсултанов, Р. А.; Товсултанова, М. Ш. (2020). "Военно-политическая обстановка в Чечне в начале XIX в." [Military-Political Situation in Chechnya at the Beginning of the XIXth Century] (PDF). Вестник Академии наук Чеченской Республики [Bulletin of the Academy of Sciences of the Chechen Republic] (in Russian) (4 (51)). Грозный: Академия наук Чеченской Республики: 40–45. doi:10.25744/vestnik.2020.51.4.007. ISSN 2076-2348.

==== Websites ====
- Бирюков, А. В. (1998). "Обзор отношений России и Чечни в XVIII — первой половине XIX в." [Overview of Relations between Russia and Chechnya in the 18th and First Half of the 19th Century]. Библиотека Андрея Бирюкова (Авторская интернет-версия статьи) (in Russian). Андрей Викторович Бирюков. § «Борьба с чеченцами и их соседями в XIX в.».
- Гапуров, Ш. А. (2002). "Россия и Чечня в первой четверти XIX века" [Russia and Chechnya in the First Quarter of the 19th Century]. Чеченская библиотека Пашкова Романа (in Russian).
