= Paraboch Ambush =

1802 military conflict in Chechnya

- Part of Chechen-Russian conflict
- Map of the North Caucasus Line. The Ivanovsky Fortress can be seen near modern-day Paraboch.
Date	9 October [O.S. 27 September] 1802
Location	Near the Paraboch Village, Russian Empire (Modern-day Paraboch village, Shelkovskoy District, Chechnya) 43°28′22″N 46°17′41″E
Result	Chechen Abrek Victory

Belligerents
Chechen Abreks	Russian Empire; Greben Cossacks

Commanders and leaders
Bey-Bulat Taymiev	(Russian Empire) Ivan Delpozzo (POW)

Strength
21	4

Casualties and losses
0	Total: 4; 3 KIA; 1 POW
- Location of the Paraboch village in modern-day Chechnya.

The Ambush near Paraboch was Bey-Bulat Taymievs second attack against the Russian Empire, following not long after his first attack, the Terek Cordon Raid. Bey-Bulat, at the head of 20 Chechen Abreks, successfully ambushed colonel Ivan Delpozzo, capturing him and killing all of his guards, after which the colonel was taken to Germenchuk.

This incident, along with his previous raid led to the rise of Bey-Bulat Taymievs political and military, with Chechens across Chechnya joining his forces in masses.

== Background ==
Following the suppression of Sheikh Mansur's uprising, the eastern section of the Caucasian Line experienced a period of relative peace. However, by the end of the eighteenth century, hostilities between Cossack detachments and Chechen communities had resumed. These clashes included small-scale raids, livestock seizures, and punitive expeditions. In 1799, a detachment of Greben Cossacks under Major Zachotov raided Isti-Su, (Note: Modern-day Melchkhi, Gudermessky District, Chechnya. Historically also referred to as Goryachenskaya.) seizing livestock and capturing two Chechens along with their horses.

The ambush at Paraboch followed not long after Bey-Bulats previous raid on a cordon on the Terek River, where he burnt down a Russian outpost and killed 11 Cossack guards guarding it. (Note: Main article: Terek Cordon Raid.)

== Ambush ==
On the morning of 27 September 1802 (Note: 9 October N.S.; According to Russian military historian Vasily Potto, the ambush took place on 20 September.) Colonel Ivan Delpozzo, accompanied by three Greben Cossacks, set out for the nearby village of Paraboch. At the time, the banks of the Terek River were covered by dense forests, which provided cover for Chechen fighters conducting raids against Russian and Cossack forces. The forest extended as far as Paraboch, and the road leading to the village passed through thick vegetation.

As Delpozzo and his escort travelled through the forest, they were suddenly ambushed by a group of 20 Chechen fighters, led by Bey-Bulat Taymiev. The attackers emerged from dense bushes covered with grapevines and hops near a bend in the road, taking the party by surprise. Within minutes, all of the guards and the coachman were overpowered and shot dead by the Chechens, leaving Delpozzo alone and unarmed. He attempted to defend himself with his walking cane and continued resisting until he was wounded by a sabre and collapsed from exhaustion.

Recognizing Delpozzo's identity, the attackers decided to capture him alive in the hope of obtaining a substantial ransom. They placed a lasso around his neck and forced him to accompany them, striking him repeatedly with his own cane. He was eventually bound and placed across a horse's saddle before being taken across the Terek River to the Chechen village of Germenchuk.

Several months after his capture, Russian authorities received information that Delpozzo's captors were demanding a ransom of 20,000 silver rubles in exchange for his release.

== Aftermath ==
=== Rise of Bey-Bulat Taymiev ===
The capture of Ivan Delpozzo, along with his previous Terek Cordon Raid resulted in Chechen fighters joining Bey-Bulats forces in masses, with Bey-Bulat Taymiev being reported as the foreman (Note: Chechen: Юрт-Да, romanized: Yurt-Da, lit. 'Father of the village'.) of Shali and the Chief Chechen horseman (Note: Chechen: б1о-баьчча, romanized: B'o-Bäçça.) in 1807.
In the report on this raid, Bey-Bulat is first mentioned by name. The Tsarist command, in its orders to active troops, wrote: An unknown villain — the Chechen Beybulat — crossed the Terek naked and committed a grave atrocity, for which this scoundrel must be captured.

=== Russian Response ===
The capture of I. P. Delpozzo shocked the entire Caucasus leadership. Pavel Tsitsianov, who had just recently become the viceroy of the Caucasus decided to take harsh measures against the Chechens and North Caucasians in general. In addition to military action against the mountaineers, Tsitsianov, for the first time in the history of the conflict, applied a new method: systematically, over a period of years, destroying the grain of the Chechens and drive away their lifestock in order to deprive them of their livelihood and suppress them through starvation. This strategy would later be adopted by Alexey Yermolov during his time as the commander of the Russian forces in the Caucasus.

After the negotiations, Pavel Tsitsianov ordered the commander of the North Caucasus Line, Vasily Shepelev, to punish the Chechen villages through which the abreks had passed as well as capture their lifestock to use its proceeds as ransom for Delpozzo. Shepelev gathered 1,200 men, crossed the Terek River on 23 June, 1803 and attacked 2 peaceful Chechen villages belonging to the Kachkalyk society on the 25th. The Chechens, caught by surprise, were unable to offer any serious resistance, and the Russian troops captured over 1,100 head of lifestock and sold them for 10,000 rubles, most of which was used to ransom Ivan Delpozzo (See below). (Note: Main article: Kachkalyk Expedition (1803).)

Russian armies under Major Savalyev carried out two more punitive expeditions in Chechnya later that year, while the Chechens responded by even more raids on the North Caucasus Line, known as the Bandit War.

=== Captivity and Release of Ivan Delpozzo ===
Ivan Delpozzo was held in extremely harsh conditions in the village of Germenchuk. According to Alikhanov, who visited him:
“Before him was no a man, but a skeleton. Heavy shackles hung on his arms and legs; A thick iron ring with a huge padlock was placed around his neck, and from this ring a heavy chain passed through the wall of the Saklya and secured outside to a thick and sturdy post. Ivan Delpozzos bed was a tattered piece of sheepksin thrown on the bare floor, and he wore almost no clothing. The old man, as Alikhanov later recounted, would sometimes cry like a child, then, emboldened, would joke about his chains and talk about the vicissitudes of human fate.”

A translator named Alikhanov, who had extensive family connections and influential contacts in Chechnya, was appointed to negotiate Delpozzo's release. Alikhanov travelled to Germenchuk, where he negotiated with the Abreks and succeeded in reducing the ransom to 4,200 silver rubles. However, Russian authorities feared that the Abreks might accept the payment but refuse to release Delpozzo, instead taking the person delivering the money captive.

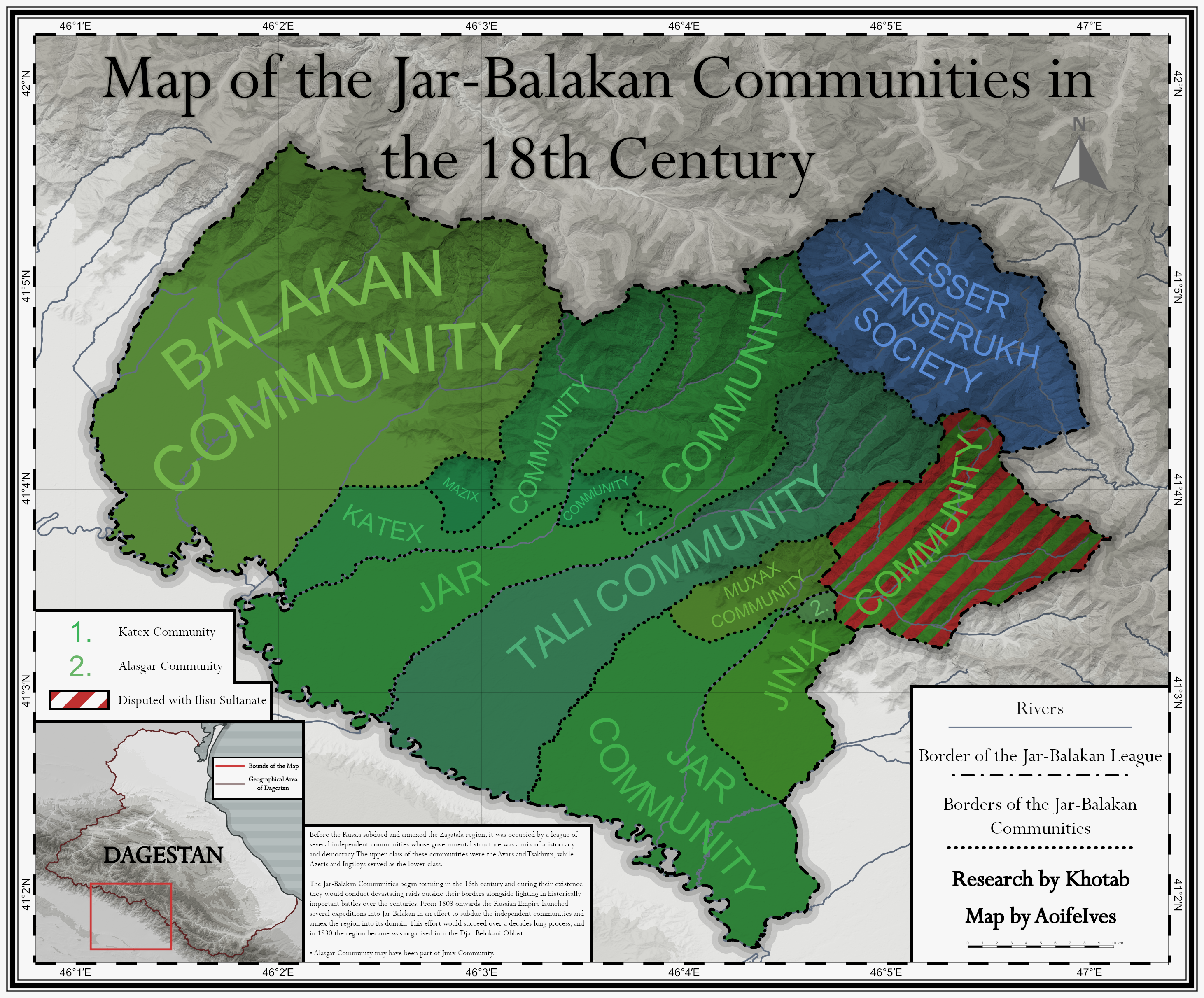
Map of the Jar-Balakan communities in the 18th century.

The Russian command engaged mountaineer mediators in negotiations for Ivan Delpozzos release, specifically the Shamkhal of Tarki and the Jar-Balakan Lezgins. Following these negotiations, Russian authorities under Pavel Tsitsianov ordered the Jar-Balakan communities to secure Delpozzo's release. The Russian Empire had recently suppressed an uprising by the Jar-Balakan people and threatened to sell all Jar-Balakan prisoners of war if they failed to secure his freedom. In return, Russian authorities promised to release between 60 and 100 Jar-Balakan captives if they succeeded.

Meanwhile, Tsitsianov ordered Vasily Shepelev, commander of the North Caucasus Line, to carry out a punitive operation against the villages through which Delpozzo's captors had passed.

After the successful expedition, Ivan Delpozzo was ransomed for 8,400 silver rubles, twice the agreed amount.

Following his release, Delpozzo returned to Russian military service with the rank of major general and was appointed bailiff of the Kabardian people. He later served as commander of the North Caucasus Line from 1814 to 1818.

== See also ==
- Bey-Bulat Taymiev — Leader of the Chechen Abreks.
- Ivan Delpozzo — Colonel captured by Bey-Bulat during the ambush, future commander of the North Caucasus Line.
- Terek Cordon Raid — Bey-Bulats previous and first attack on the Russian Empire.
- Kachkalyk Expedition (1803) — Russian expedition in response to the capture of Ivan Delpozzo.

== Sources ==
=== Bibliography ===
==== Historical Works ====
- Потто, В. А. (1887). "LII. Генерал Дельпоццо" [52. General Delpozzo]. Кавказская война в отдельных очерках, эпизодах, легендах и биографиях [The Caucasian War in Separate Essays, Episodes, Legends and Biographies] (in Russian). Vol. 1: От древнейших времен до Ермолова (2nd ed.). Санкт-Петербург: Издание книжного склада В. А. Березовского; Типография Е. А. Евдокимова. pp. 688–696 – via Восточная литература.

==== Modern Scholarship ====
===== Russian =====
- Авторханов, А. Г. (1930). К основным вопросам истории Чечни: К десятилетию Советской Чечни [On the Basic Questions of the History of Chechnya: On the Tenth Anniversary of Soviet Chechnya] (in Russian). Грозный: Чечизд-во «Серло». pp. 1–105.
- Ахмадов, Я. З.; Хасмагомадов, Э. Х. (2005). "Глава II. Чечня в первой трети XIX века. Взаимоотношения с Российской империей" [Chapter 2. Chechnya in the first third of the 19th century. Relations with the Russian Empire]. История Чечни в XIX-XX веках [History of Chechnya in the 19th-20th Centuries]. История Чечни с древнейших времен до конца XVIII века (in Russian). Москва: Пульс. pp. 77–121. ISBN 5-93486-046-1 – via eLIBRARY.RU.
- Гапуров, Ш. А.; Товсултанов, Р. А. (2019). "Глава 1. Чечня в начале XIX века. Начало военно-политической деятельности Бей-Булата Таймиева" [Chapter 1. Chechnya at the beginning of the 19th century. The beginning of the military-political activities of Bey-Bulat Taymiev]. In Магамадов, С. С. (ed.). Бей-Булат Таймиев и его время (Российско-чеченские отношения в первой трети XIX века) [Bey-Bulat Taimiev and His Time (Russian-Chechen Relations in the First Third of the 19th Century)] (in Russian). Грозный: АО «Издательско-полиграфический комплекс „Грозненский рабочий“». pp. 33–156. ISBN 978-5-4314-0391-0. OCLC 1143826539 – via Bavarian State Library.
- Хожаев, Д. А. (1998). "Тайми Биболт" [Taymi Bibolt]. In Мазаева, Тамара (ed.). Чеченцы в Русско-Кавказской войне [Chechens in the Russo-Caucasian War] (in Russian). Грозный–Санкт-Петербург: Седа. pp. 45–59. ISBN 5-85973-012-8. Archived from the original on 22 December 2014.
- Тесаев, З. А. (2020). "Таймиев Бей-Булат (1779–1831)" [Taymiev Bey-Bulat (1779–1831)] (PDF). In Гапуров, Ш. А.; Магамадов, С. С. (eds.). Исторические личности Чечни (XI–XXI вв.) [Historical Personalities of Chechnya (11th–21st Centuries)] (PDF) (in Russian). Vol. 1, Book 1: Political and Public Figures. Грозный: АО «Издательско-полиграфический комплекс „Грозненский рабочий“». pp. 169–176. ISBN 978-5-4314-0422-1 – via eLIBRARY.RU.

===== English =====
- Gammer, Moshe (2006). "Chapter 4: The Beginning of the Caucasian War". The Lone Wolf and the Bear: Three Centuries of Chechen Defiance of Russian Rule. Pitt Series in Russian and East European Studies. Pittsburgh, Pennsylvania: University of Pittsburgh Press. pp. 31–44. ISBN 0-8229-5898-8. OCLC 62329896. OL 22724688M – via Open Library.

==== Articles ====
- Гапуров, Ш. А.; Товсултанов, Р. А.; Товсултанова, М. Ш. (2020). "Военно-политическая обстановка в Чечне в начале XIX в." [Military-Political Situation in Chechnya at the Beginning of the XIXth Century] (PDF). Вестник Академии наук Чеченской Республики [Bulletin of the Academy of Sciences of the Chechen Republic] (in Russian) (4 (51)). Грозный: Академия наук Чеченской Республики: 40–45. doi:10.25744/vestnik.2020.51.4.007. ISSN 2076-2348.

==== Websites ====
- Бирюков, А. В. (1998). "Обзор отношений России и Чечни в XVIII — первой половине XIX в." [Overview of Relations between Russia and Chechnya in the 18th and First Half of the 19th Century]. Библиотека Андрея Бирюкова (Авторская интернет-версия статьи) (in Russian). Андрей Викторович Бирюков. § «Борьба с чеченцами и их соседями в XIX в.».
