= Evil Trench Fortress =

19th-Century Russian Fortress in Chechnya

- Злобный Окоп
- Part of the North Caucasus Line
- Groznensky District, Chechnya
- Map of Lesser Chechnya and part of the Vladikavkaz district. The Evil Trench Fortress (Zlobny Okop) can be seen on the Sunzha River.

Site information
- Type: Fortress
- Owner: Russian Empire
- Operator: Imperial Russian Army
- Controlled by: Russian Empire
- Condition: Destroyed

Location
- Location within modern-day Chechnya.
- Location within Chechnya
- Coordinates: 43.256659°N 45.582888°E

Site history
- Built: 1820
- Built by: Nikolay Grekov
- Fate: Captured and destroyed by North Caucasian rebels in 1825; subsequently abandoned by Russian authorities.
- Demolished: 1825
- Battles/wars: Caucasian War; Insurgency in the North Caucasus (1825-1826); Siege of the Evil Trench Fortress

Garrison information
- Garrison: 130; 100 Infantry; 30 Cossacks

The Evil Trench Fortress (Russian: Злобный Окоп, romanized: Zlobniy Okop) was a Russian fortification built during the Caucasian War in 1820 by Nikolay Grekov. It was destroyed and abandoned in 1825 when North Caucasian rebels captured it after a week-long siege.

== Location and Establishment ==
Map depicting the Evil Trench Fortress and other fortress on the North Caucasus Line in Chechnya.

The fortress was established near the Three Brothers tract on the Sunzha River in 1820 by Nikolay Grekov. It was located southwest of the historical Chechen villages of Amir-Khan-Kichu (Note: Chechen: Iаьмирханан гечо, romanized: 'Ämirkhanan Gecho.) and Kalkan-Yurt, near modern-day Alkhan-Yurt, and formed part of a wider Russian effort to strengthen the North Caucasus Line and to fend off Chechen raids.

These measures were aimed at putting pressure on the Chechens. Alexey Yermolov wrote: "I wish to forgive only in the case when they will be completely dependent on us for their means of existence."

The location had strategic importance because, “when the water level in the Sunzha rose, there was one of the best crossing points for bands of robbers”.

== Design and Garrison ==
The fortress was a small redoubt forming part of the Russian fortifications along the Sunzha River, known as the Sunzha Line. Its garrison was made up of 100 Russian infantrymen and 30 Cossacks.

== History ==
The fortress received its name, “Evil Trench”, from the Battle of Aldy, where, in 1785, a Russian force under colonel Nikolay de Pieri was destroyed in an ambush by Chechen forces under Sheikh Mansur. This was the point where de Pieri crossed the Sunzha River on his way to Aldy.

=== Destruction ===
In late May 1825, a large rebellion broke out in the North Caucasus under the newly elected Imam Muhammad al-Quduqli and Bey-Bulat Taymiev. The Evil Trench fortress saw the first major engagement of the rebellion when a detachment of rebels led by the Chechen leader Yahya Khan of Chakhkeri besieged the fortress. The garrison was forced to abandon the fortress and flee to Groznaya after its water supply was exhausted. The rebels subsequently captured and destroyed the fortress, after which it was abandoned by the Russian authorities.

== Sources ==
=== Bibliography ===
==== Historical Works ====
- Дубровин, Н. Ф. (1888). История войны и владычества русских на Кавказе [History of the War and Russian Rule in the Caucasus] (in Russian). Vol. 6: Ртищев и Ермолов [Rtishchev and Yermolov]. Санкт-Петербург: Типография Департамента уделов. pp. I–XII, 1–756 – via Электронная библиотека ГПИБ.
- Эсадзе, С. С. (1909). Штурм Гуниба и пленение Шамиля: Исторический очерк Кавказско-горской войны в Чечне и Дагестане [The Storming of Gunib and the Capture of Shamil: A Historical Essay on the Caucasian Mountain War in Chechnya and Dagestan] (in Russian). Тифлис: Военно-исторический отдел; Типография штаба Кавказского военного округа. pp. [6], I–II, 1–208, 4 – via Электронная библиотека ГПИБ.

==== Modern Scholarship ====
- Гапуров, Ш. А.; Товсултанов, Р. А. (2019). Магамадов, С. С. (ed.). Бей-Булат Таймиев и его время (Российско-чеченские отношения в первой трети XIX века) [Bey-Bulat Taimiev and His Time (Russian-Chechen Relations in the First Third of the 19th Century)] (in Russian). Грозный: АО «Издательско-полиграфический комплекс „Грозненский рабочий“». pp. 1–656. ISBN 978-5-4314-0391-0.
- Клычников, Ю.Ю. (1998). Деятельность А. П. Ермолова на Северном Кавказе (1816–1827) [The Activities of A. P. Yermolov in the North Caucasus (1816–1827)] (PDF) (Candidate of Historical Sciences dissertation) (in Russian). Армавир: Армавирский государственный педагогический институт. pp. 1–256.

==== Journals ====
- Головлёв, А. А. (2017). "К двухсотлетнему юбилею Грозного: урбанонимия и микротопонимия. Статья 2. О местонахождении аулов и хуторов, находившихся на территории современного города" [To the 200th anniversary of Grozny: urbanonymy and microtoponymy. Article 2. On the location of auls and hamlets situated within the territory of the modern city]. Региональное развитие (in Russian) (5 (23)). ISSN 2410-1672.
