= Red Army (disambiguation) =

The Red Army was the army of Soviet Russia (1918–1922) and the Soviet Union (1922–1946).

Red Army may also refer to:

== Armies ==
- Bavarian Red Army of the Bavarian Soviet Republic
- Catholic and Royal Army of western French royalists opposed to the French Revolution, also known as the "Red Army" because of its Sacred Heart emblem
- Chinese Red Army, later known as the People's Liberation Army
- Hungarian Red Army of the Hungarian Soviet Republic
- Mongolian People's Army, the Red Army of Mongolia
- Chechen Red Army , the Red Army of Chechnya

== Insurgent, militia, militant and terrorist groups ==
- Red Army Faction (1970–1998), a far-left militant terrorist group in Germany
- Red Army Faction (1968–1971), a far-left communist militant organization originating in Japan
- Japanese Red Army (1971–2001), an international communist terrorist group originating in Japan
- United Red Army (1971–1972), a Japanese far-left far-left militant organization
- Lal Sena ("Red Army", 1974–1990), a communist militia group in northwestern India
- Red Army of Turin, Italy, formed in 1919 to defend socialist activities
- Red Brigades (1970–2000s), a violent Italian insurgent group
- Ruhr Red Army (1920), a large military organisation of the Ruhr Workers Councils in Germany

== Sports ==
- HC CSKA Moscow, the ice hockey team of the Central Sports Army Club in Moscow, Russia, often called "Red Army" in English
- Persepolis F.C., a football team from Tehran, Iran, often called "Red Army" by media and supporters
- Red Army, another name for the Russian Five ice hockey line of the Detroit Red Wings in the NHL in the 1990s
- Red Army (football), football hooligan firm of Manchester United FC, England

== Other ==
- Red Army, the opposing force to the Blue Army in the American web series machinima Red vs. Blue
- Red Army (film), a 2014 documentary about the Soviet hockey team
- Red Army (novel), a 1989 Cold War novel by Ralph Peters
- Red Army Standard Ammunition, a brand and supplier of ammunition cartridges in the United States
- Milwaukee Electric Tool enthusiasts are often called the “Red Army”

== See also ==
- Red Guards (disambiguation)
- Red Ribbon Army in Dragon Ball
- Soviet Army, successor of the Red Army
