= Terek Cordon Raid =

1802 Raid against the Russian Empire

Terek Cossack Cordon Raid
- Part of Caucasian War
Date	Autumn 1802
Location	Cossack outpost on the Terek River (Modern-day Chechnya)
Result	Chechen Abrek Victory

Belligerents
Chechen Abreks	Russian Empire; Cossacks

Commanders and leaders
Bey-Bulat Taymiev	Unknown

Strength
8	Unknown

Casualties and losses
Unknown	11 KIA

In the fall of 1802, the future Mekhk-Da of Chechnya, Bey-Bulat Taymiev, led his first attack against the Russian Empire when he led a group of fighters in an attack on a Cossack outpost on the Terek River. The Abreks burnt the outpost down, killing 11 Cossack guards and retreated immediately afterwards. This attack, along with the Paraboch Raid soon after made Bey-Bulat famous in Chechnya and gave rise to his political and military career.

== History ==
In the autumn of 1802, Bey-Bulat Taymiev, leading a group of 7 fighters, crossed the Terek River on inflated goat skin cloacks, and made his way to a Cossack cordon. With the aim of avenging the killed Chechens, especially Bey-Bulats friend, the Chechen fighters attacked the Cossack outpost, killed 11 guards, captured their weapons, and burnt the outpost down. He then made his way back across the Terek in the same way.

The tsarist command, in its orders to the active troops, wrote: “An unknown villain — the Chechen Beybulat — crossed the Terek naked and committed a grave atrocity, for which this scoundrel must be captured.”

This attack made Bey-Bulat gain the reputation of a "Daring Abrek" among the Russian authorities, and along with his raid on Paraboch in September of the same year, this raid caused Bey-Bulat to become famous across Chechnya.

== See also ==
- Bey-Bulat Taymiev — Leader of the Chechen Abreks.
- Paraboch Raid — Bey-Bulat Taymievs next raid.

== Sources ==
=== Bibliography ===
- Авторханов, А. Г. (1930). К основным вопросам истории Чечни: К десятилетию Советской Чечни [On the Basic Questions of the History of Chechnya: On the Tenth Anniversary of Soviet Chechnya] (in Russian). Грозный: Чечизд-во «Серло». pp. 1–105.
- Ахмадов, Я. З.; Хасмагомадов, Э. Х. (2005). "Глава V. Выдающиеся деятели Чечни первой половины XIX века" [Chapter 5. Prominent figures of Chechnya in the first half of the 19th century]. История Чечни в XIX-XX веках [History of Chechnya in the 19th-20th Centuries]. История Чечни с древнейших времен до конца XVIII века (in Russian). Москва: Пульс. pp. 240–274. ISBN 5-93486-046-1 – via eLIBRARY.RU.
- Хожаев, Д. А. (1998). "Тайми Биболт" [Taymi Bibolt]. In Мазаева, Тамара (ed.). Чеченцы в Русско-Кавказской войне [Chechens in the Russo-Caucasian War] (in Russian). Грозный–Санкт-Петербург: Седа. pp. 45–59. ISBN 5-85973-012-8. Archived from the original on 22 December 2014.
