= Siege of the Evil Trench Fortress =

1825 Military Conflict between the Russian Empire and the North Caucasians

- Part of Caucasian War, Insurgency in the North Caucasus (1825-1826)
- Map depicting the Evil Trench Fortress and other fortress on the North Caucasus Line in Chechnya.
Date	Late June 1825 (1 week)
Location	Evil Trench Fortress, Sunzha Line, Russian Empire (Near modern-day Alkhan-Yurt, Groznensky District, Chechnya) 43.256659°N 45.582888°E
Result	North Caucasian Victory: Destruction of the Fortress
Territorial changes	Rebel forces take control of the banks of the Sunzha River.

Belligerents
(Chechnya) North Caucasian Imamate	Russian Empire; Cossacks

Commanders and leaders
(Chechnya) Yahya Khan of Chakhkeri	Unknown

Strength
Unknown	130; 100 Russian Infantry; 30 Cossacks
- Approximate location of the Evil Trench Fortress in modern-day Chechnya.

The Siege of the Evil Trench Fortress (Note: Russian: Злобный Окоп, romanized: Zlobniy Okop, lit. 'Evil trench'.) was the first major engagement of the 1825–1826 Insurgency in the North Caucasus. North Caucasian forces led by Yahya Khan of Chakhkeri captured and destroyed the fortress after a week-long siege.

== Evil Trench Fortress ==
Map of Lesser Chechnya and part of the Vladikavkaz district. The Evil Trench Fortress (Zlobny Okop) can be seen on the Sunzha River.

The Evil Trench Fortress (Zlobny Okop) was a Russian fortification established in 1820 by Nikolay Grekov near the Chechen villages of Amir-Khan-Kichu, (Note: Chechen: Iаьмирханан гечо, romanized: 'Ämirkhanan Gecho.) and Kalkan-Yurt, close to present-day Alkhan-Yurt. Its garrison consisted of 100 Russian infantrymen and 30 Cossacks.

== Background ==
During the 1820s, anti-Russian movements spread across the North Caucasus, driven by punitive expeditions, the destruction of villages, heavy taxation, and the execution of local inhabitants under General Aleksey Yermolov. In the first half of 1825, North Caucasian leaders began preparing a new uprising against the Russian Empire.
On 29 May, a congress of North Caucasian leaders was held in Mayrtup, Chechnya. The meeting declared a new rebellion under the leadership of the newly elected Imam Muhammad al-Quduqli and the Chechen leader Bey-Bulat Taymiev.

== Siege and Aftermath ==
Following the declaration of the rebellion on 29 May, an open armed rebellion began in late June, when rebel forces led by Yahya Khan of Chakhkeri, an associate of Bey-Bulat Taymiev, besieged the Evil Trench Fortress near present-day Alkhan-Yurt. The siege lasted for about a week. After the fortress's water supply was exhausted, the Russian garrison broke out and retreated to the Groznaya Fortress. This happened at the same time the main rebel force under Taymiev had occupied Atagi. (Note: See also: Battle of Amir-Hajji-Yurt § Movement of the Rebel Forces.)

After capturing the Evil Trench Fortress, the North Caucasian forces destroyed the fortress, which was subsequently abandoned by the Russian authorities. The victory strengthened the position of the rebels along the Sunzha River, and, according to Russian reports, it "emboldened" the Chechens and allowed them to control the riverbanks "to such an extent that our troops could no longer mow enough hay."

Some sources instead attribute the siege and capture of the Evil Trench Fortress to Bey-Bulat Taymiev, placing it after his capture of the Amir-Hajji-Yurt fortress and before the Siege of Gerzel-Aul. However, this is a misconception, as the siege of Zlobny Okop lasted for a week, while the battle of Amir-Hajji-Yurt ended on 8 July and the siege of Gerzel-Aul began on 10 July.

== See also ==
- Bey-Bulat Taymiev — Main leader of the rebel forces.
- Battle of Amir-Hajji-Yurt — Next major battle of the war.

== Sources ==
=== Bibliography ===
==== Historical Works ====
- Дубровин, Н. Ф. (1888). История войны и владычества русских на Кавказе [History of the War and Russian Rule in the Caucasus] (in Russian). Vol. 6: Ртищев и Ермолов [Rtishchev and Yermolov]. Санкт-Петербург: Типография Департамента уделов. pp. I–XII, 1–756 – via Электронная библиотека ГПИБ.
- Потто, В. А. (1887). "Чеченский мятеж." [Chechen Rebellion]. Кавказская война в отдельных очерках, эпизодах, легендах и биографиях [The Caucasian War in Separate Essays, Episodes, Legends and Biographies] (in Russian). Vol. 2. Санкт-Петербург. pp. 130–179 – via Восточная литература.
- Эсадзе, С. С. (1909). Штурм Гуниба и пленение Шамиля: Исторический очерк Кавказско-горской войны в Чечне и Дагестане [The Storming of Gunib and the Capture of Shamil: A Historical Essay on the Caucasian Mountain War in Chechnya and Dagestan] (in Russian). Тифлис: Военно-исторический отдел; Типография штаба Кавказского военного округа. pp. [6], I–II, 1–208, 4 – via Электронная библиотека ГПИБ.

==== Modern Scholarship ====
- Гапуров, Ш. А.; Товсултанов, Р. А. (2019). Магамадов, С. С. (ed.). Бей-Булат Таймиев и его время (Российско-чеченские отношения в первой трети XIX века) [Bey-Bulat Taimiev and His Time (Russian-Chechen Relations in the First Third of the 19th Century)] (in Russian). Грозный: АО «Издательско-полиграфический комплекс „Грозненский рабочий“». pp. 1–656. ISBN 978-5-4314-0391-0.
- Хожаев, Д. А. (1998). Мазаева, Тамара (ed.). Чеченцы в Русско-Кавказской войне [Chechens in the Russian-Caucasian War] (in Russian). Грозный-Санкт-Петербург: Седа. pp. 1–250. ISBN 5-85973-012-8. Archived from the original on 2014-12-22.

==== Articles ====
- Головлёв, А. А. (2017). "К двухсотлетнему юбилею Грозного: урбанонимия и микротопонимия. Статья 2. О местонахождении аулов и хуторов, находившихся на территории современного города" [To the 200th anniversary of Grozny: urbanonymy and microtoponymy. Article 2. On the location of auls and hamlets situated within the territory of the modern city]. Региональное развитие (in Russian) (5 (23)). ISSN 2410-1672.
