= Kisten Ridge =

Mountains in Russia

Geography
- Region: Caucasus
- Parent range: Caucasus Mountains
- Borders on: Lesser Caucasus

Kisten Ridge — one of the mountain ranges of the Greater Caucasus (separated from the main ridge at Mount Barbalo), located in the northeastern part of it, along the left bank of the Andy Koisu River. It forms the watershed of the basin of this river with the rivers of the Sunzha River basin (generally speaking, the Terek-Sulak watershed). From the slopes of the river flow Aksay, Aktash.

The length of the ridge is approximately 60 km, the maximum height is 2736 m. It is composed mainly of limestone of the Cretaceous period. Mountain meadow landscapes are widespread on tops, mountain-forest landscapes on northern slopes, and bush-steppe shrubs on southern ones (much steeper).

Along the ridge passes the border between Chechnya and Dagestan in their mountainous part.
