= Red Guards (disambiguation) =

The Red Guards were a student-led paramilitary social movement during the Chinese Cultural Revolution.

Red Guard(s) or Redguards may also refer to:

== Communist and socialist groups ==
- Worker-Peasant Red Guards, militia in North Korea
- Red Guards (Russia), during the Russian Revolution and the Russian Civil War
- Red Guards (Finland), during the Finnish Civil War
- Red Guard Party, a militant Chinese-American civil rights group closely modeled after the Black Panthers
- Red Guards (Bavaria), in the Bavarian Soviet Republic
- Red Guards (Hungary), in the Hungarian Soviet Republic (1918–1919)
- Red Guards (Italy), during the Biennio Rosso
- Young Red Guards Cadet Corps, a paramilitary unit in North Korea
- Red Guards (USA), American Marxist–Leninist–Maoist collectives
- Red Guards (Ceylon), military wing of the Janatha Vimukthi Peramuna

== Other groups ==
- Red Guard of Senegal, a gendarmerie in charge of presidential security

== Fictional uses ==
- Red Guards (Emperor's Royal Guard), fictional elite Imperial corps of the Star Wars universe
- The Red Guard (novel), a 1967 novel in the Killmaster series of spy novels
- Redguards, a fantasy race of The Elder Scrolls universe
- The Elder Scrolls Adventures: Redguard, a 1998 computer game based on The Elder Scrolls universe

== See also ==
- Red Army (disambiguation)
- Red Guardian, fictional character
- Red Scare
- Red Squad
