= Chechen Red Army =

Chechen Red army
- Leader: Aslanbek Sheripov
- Dates active: 1919-1920
- Country: Soviet Union
- Allegiance: Chechnya
- Ideology: Communism
- Political position: Far-Left
- Size: 3,000

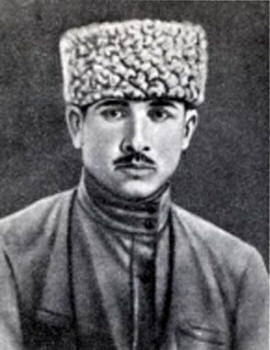
Commander of the Chechen Red Army Aslanbek Sheripov

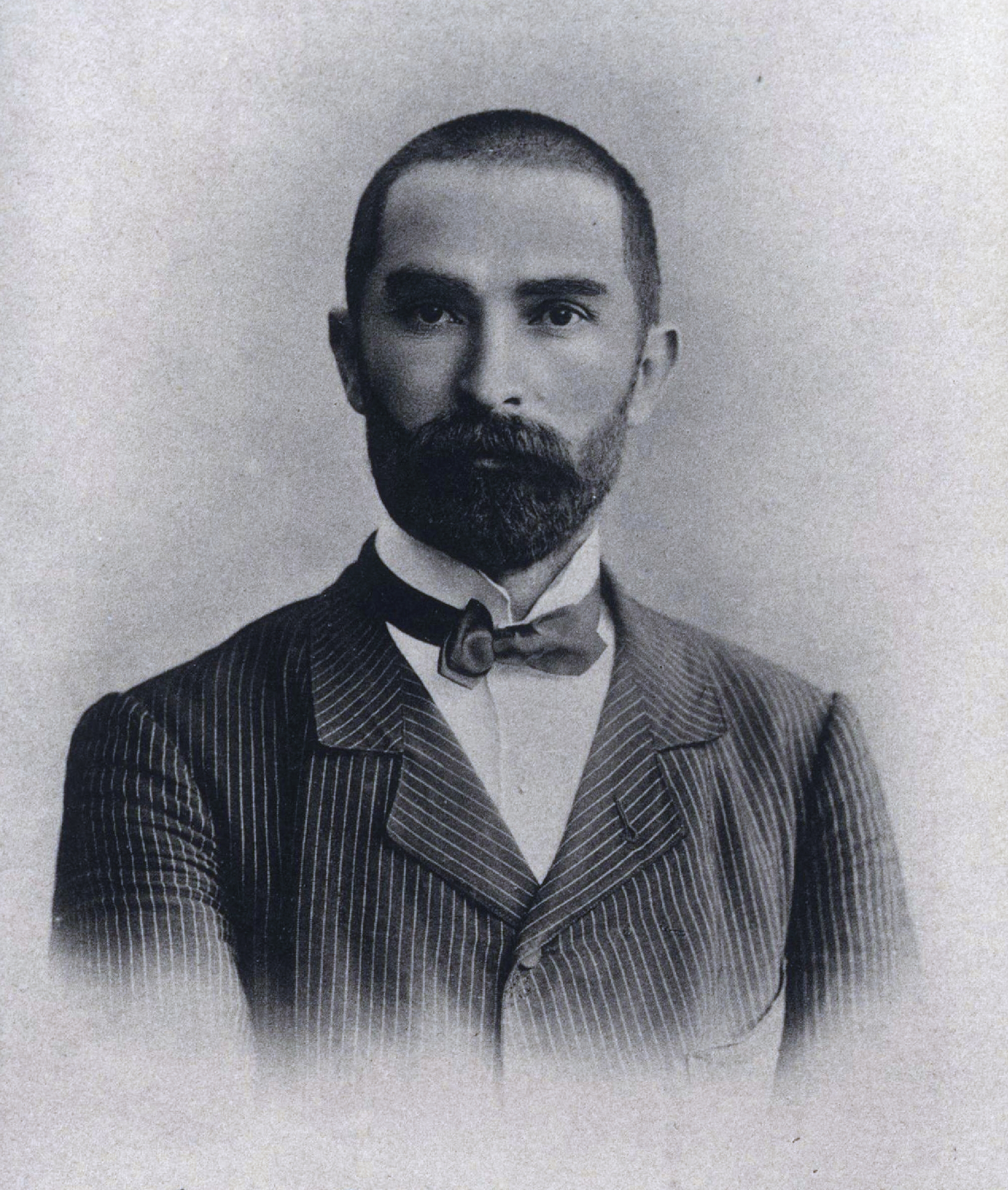
Head of the Goyty People's Council Tashtemir Eldarkhanov

The Chechen Red Army was created in August 1918. It participated in the battles of the Russian Civil War. The center of formation of the Chechen military units became the Goyty People's Council. The organizers of the army were Aslanbek Sheripov and Tashtemir Eldarkhanov. Military leadership was exercised by Aslanbek Sheripov. The army included residents of Chechen villages who supported the new government.

== Region ==
The formation of the Chechen Red Army began on the territory of the Urus-Martan district (Goyty, Alkhan-Yurt, Starye Atagi).Then its zone of influence spread to the Shatoysky district.

== Number ==
In April 1918, a Chechen Red Army regiment of 520 fighters (the largest unit) was formed in the village of Goyty. Another smaller regiment was created in Alkhan-Yurt. In Starye Atagi, a hundred Red Army soldiers were mobilized. By the summer of 1918, the Chechen Red Army numbered 3,000 fighters and consisted primarily of rural self-defense units dispersed across 18 villages.

== History ==
=== Hundred Days' Battles ===
The first mission of the Chechen Red Army was to cover the area from the Khankala Gorge to the outskirts of Grozny in order to protect the rear of the Grozny proletariat. From August to November 1918, battles took place in Grozny against the Bicherakhovites. Chechen units played a major role in protecting the rear of the soldiers' and workers' units, ensuring their supplies of ammunition and food. Near the Petropavlovskaya stanitsa, the Chechens routed a detachment of White Cossacks assisting the Bicherakhovites.

At this time, the Yermolovskaya stanitsa was under the control of counterrevolutionaries. In the vicinity of the stanitsa, fierce battles between the Red Army and the White Cossacks raged continuously. In October 1918, the Red Army dismantled the railway line leading from the stanitsa to Grozny, causing an enemy armored train to derail. Around the same time, the Chechens disrupted telephone communications between the Groznenskaya stanitsa and other stanitsas of the Sunzhenskaya Line.

Contradictions within the Goyta People's Council, to which Aslanbek Sheripov was effectively subordinate, led to a public announcement of the latter's resignation. On October 13, this announcement, addressed to the government of the Terek Soviet Republic, was published in the Vladikavkaz newspaper "People's Power." In response, the Terek People's Council, acting on its own authority, appointed Sheripov commander of the Chechen Red Army.

On November 12, 1918, thanks to the joint actions of the Grozny proletariat, Red Cossack detachments led by Alexander Dyakov, and the Chechen Red Army, the siege of Grozny was lifted, and the Bicherakhovites were forced to retreat.

At the end of November 1918, the 5th Congress of the Peoples of the Terek opens in Vladikavkaz, where Sergo Ordzhonikidze warns delegates of a new danger threatening the peoples of the Terek Oblast. He calls on the peoples of the Terek to defend Soviet power from the Chermoyev gangs with the same determination with which they fought against the Bicherakhov gangs. Following Ordzhonikidze, Aslanbek Sheripov spoke out: “The Chechen Red Army, not out of fear but out of conscience, asks to be sent to any front, and will fight the counterrevolutionaries at any time.”.

=== Invasion of the Armed Forces of South Russia ===
In January 1919, the troops of Denikin advanced toward the Terek. The 11th Army RKKA retreated to Astrakhan. The small forces of the Terek Soviet Republic, advancing to meet the White Guards, were routed. In early February, Denikin's forces approached Vladikavkaz. Two military units were sent from Grozny to assist the city's defenders. Denikin's forces sent three of their divisions to Grozny. The Red Army soldiers did not have sufficient forces to defend the city. On the night of February 2–3, the surviving Grozny residents were forced to retreat to the Sunzha (a tributary of the Terek)]. Here they joined up with Alexander Dyakov's Red Cossacks and together fought off the advancing Denikinites for several days. Residents of several villages plundered and disarmed the retreating troops. In the villages of Gekhi, Goyty, Gekhichu, Bamut, Urus-Martan, and several others, on the contrary, the Red Army soldiers received aid, shelter, and protection. For example, in Goyty, the family of one of the leaders of the Grozny proletariat, Nikolai Gikalo, was taking refuge during these days. A participant in these events, Alexei Kosterin, wrote that during this period, at least five thousand Red Army soldiers found refuge in Chechen villages. The Chechen units retreated to the mountains, where they began to gather strength to continue the fight. Denikin's forces began preparing a campaign against the Chechen villages where the Red Army soldiers had taken refuge, which became known to the Red Army leadership. The villages began preparing for defense. Denikin's intelligence reported to their leadership:

From captured Bolshevik documents

== Sources ==
- Abazatov, M. A. (1962). Из истории Гражданской войны в Чечено-Ингушетии [From the History of the Civil War in Checheno-Ingushetia] (in Russian). Grozny: Chechen-Ingush Book Publishing House.
