= Runivers =

Russian culture and history website

- Runivers homepage
- Company type: Nonprofit
- Website type: Online Library
- Headquarters: Moscow
- Owner: Runivers (non-profit)
- Website: http://runivers.ru/
- Commercial: No
- Launched: 2007
- Current status: Active

Runivers (Russian: Руниверс) is a site devoted to Russian culture and history. Runivers targets Russian speaking readers and those interested in Russian culture and history.

Runivers is an online library aimed to provide free access to authentic documents, books and texts related to Russian history, which were previously kept in major libraries and state archives. This project is not-profit.

The main body of the collection consists of facsimile copies of books and journals published before 1917 as well as archive photos and documents on the history and culture of Russia.

The digitalizing is supported by Transneft.

== Collection ==
=== Books and publications ===
As of August 2010, Runivers claimed to contain over 1,500 books (high quality facsimile copies of original materials) mostly about Russian history. Also Runivers provides access to encyclopedias, document collections and photos. Many of the publications were not available for general public or were forbidden in Soviet Union (e.g. works of Russian philosophers). The site includes a calendar with daily updates related to memorable events and people.

=== Photo collection ===
Runivers offers a collection of photographs taken by distinguished Russian photographers at the turn of the 20th century. Each photo gallery is accompanied by the biography of the photographer. The captions give information about the picture, objects on it and a place where it was taken.

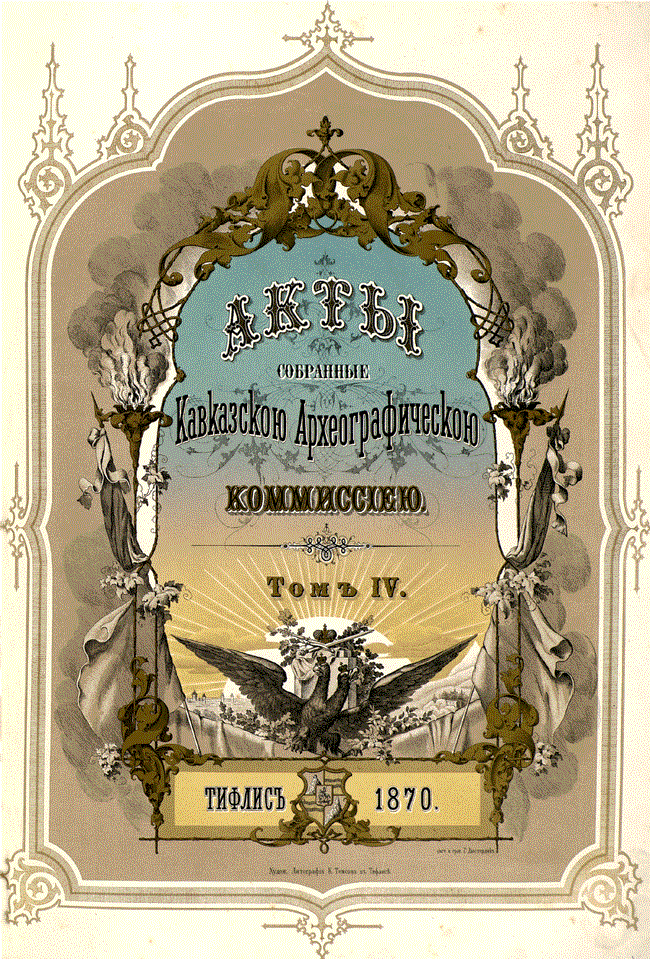

There are galleries of:

- Dmitriev, Maksim Petrovich
- Den'er, Andrey Ivanovich
- Levitsky, Sergei Lvovich
- Karl Karlovich Bulla
- Barschevskiy, Ivan Fedorovich
- Karelin, Andrey Osipovich
- Karrik, Vasiliy Andreevich
- Prokudin-Gorsky, Sergey Mikhaylovich

=== Encyclopedias ===
Runivers features a military history encyclopedia combined from:

- Encyclopedic Military Lexicon. Sankt-Petersburg. 1852–1855 (Военный энциклопедический лексикон)
- Encyclopedia of Military and Marine Sciences. Sankt-Petersburg. 1883–1897 (Энциклопедия военных и морских наук)
- Military Enceclopedia. Published by Sytin. Sankt-Petersburg. 1911–1915 (Военная энциклопедия Сытина)

=== Other parts ===
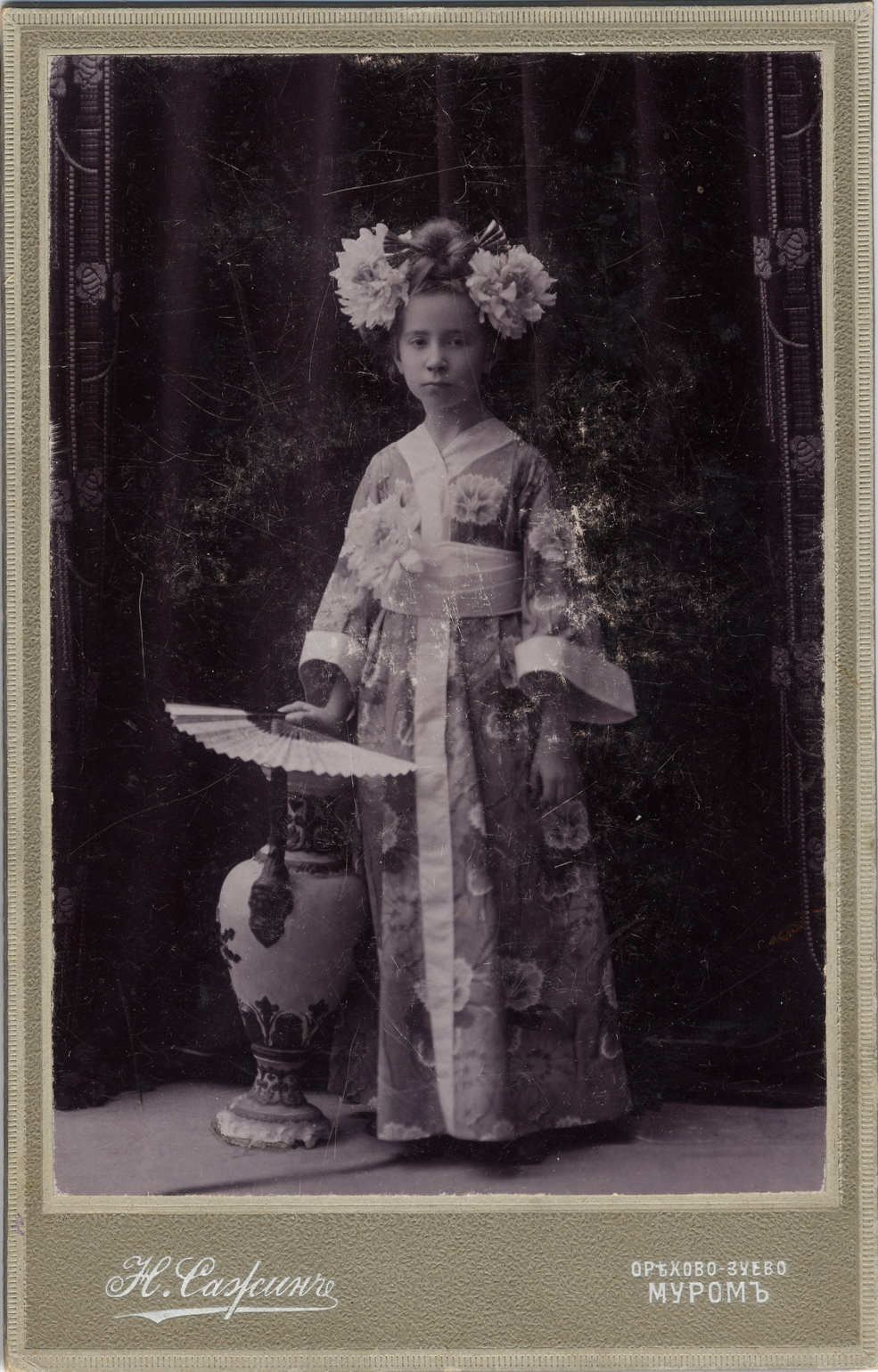
Photo by N.N. Sazhin, c. 1900

- Complete collection of laws of Russian Empire
- Complete collection of military encyclopedias
- Many other dictionaries and encyclopedias
- Periodical. Journal "Questions of philosophy and psychology" was not available for general public in Soviet Union
- Brockhaus and Efron Encyclopedic Dictionary
- Archival documents collected by Russian Academy of Sciences and the Archeographic Commission
- Collection of books on military and marine history of Russia
- There are more than 3200 historical documents presented in the Runivers covering the following topics:

- Katyn Massacre
- Crimea: history as a part of Russian Empire
- Sevastopol and Russian Navy
- Molotov–Ribbentrop Pact
- Kuril Islands: history of question
- East Prussia: history and way to Russia

- Biographies and main works of Russian philosophers as well as their books, manuscript, letters, diaries.

== See also ==
- Project Gutenberg
- Google Books
- Europeana
- World Digital Library
- Library of Congress
