= Aksay (river) =

River in the Northern Caucasus

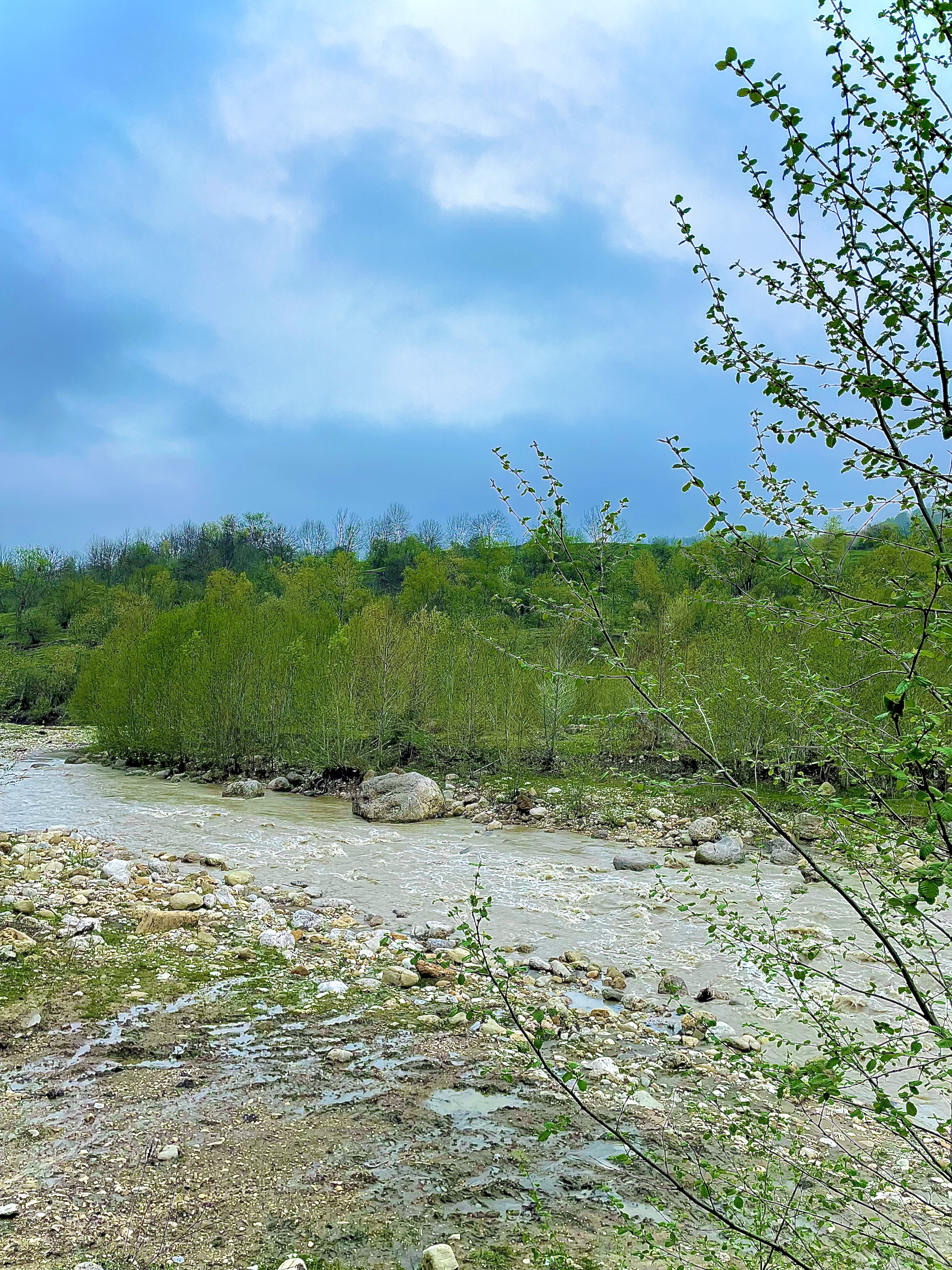
- Aksay river near Dargo, Chechnya

Location
- Country: Russia
- Region: Chechnya, Dagestan

Physical characteristics
- Source
  - location: northern slopes of the Kisten Ridge, Dagestan
  - coordinates: 42°50′59″N 46°19′23″E
  - elevation: 2,080 m (6,820 ft)
- Mouth: Babayurtovsky District, Dagestan
  - coordinates: 43°27′47″N 46°50′7″E
  - elevation: −14 m (−46 ft)
- Length: 144 km (89 mi)
- Basin size: 1,390 km^{2} (540 sq mi)
- Discharge
  - average: 5.17 m^{3} (183 cu ft) per second

The Aksay (Russian: Аксай) is a river in the Northern Caucasus region of Russia that flows through Chechnya and Dagestan. It originates in the northern slope of the Kisten Ridge region in Dagestan and flows into the Aksai reservoir, which is connected by a canal to the Aktash river. It is 144 kilometers (89 mi) long, and has an overall slope of 14.5m/km. The river is the left tributary of the Aktash.

== Tributaries ==
The main tributaries are:

- Yamansu
