= Greben Cossacks =

Group of Cossacks in the northern Caucasus

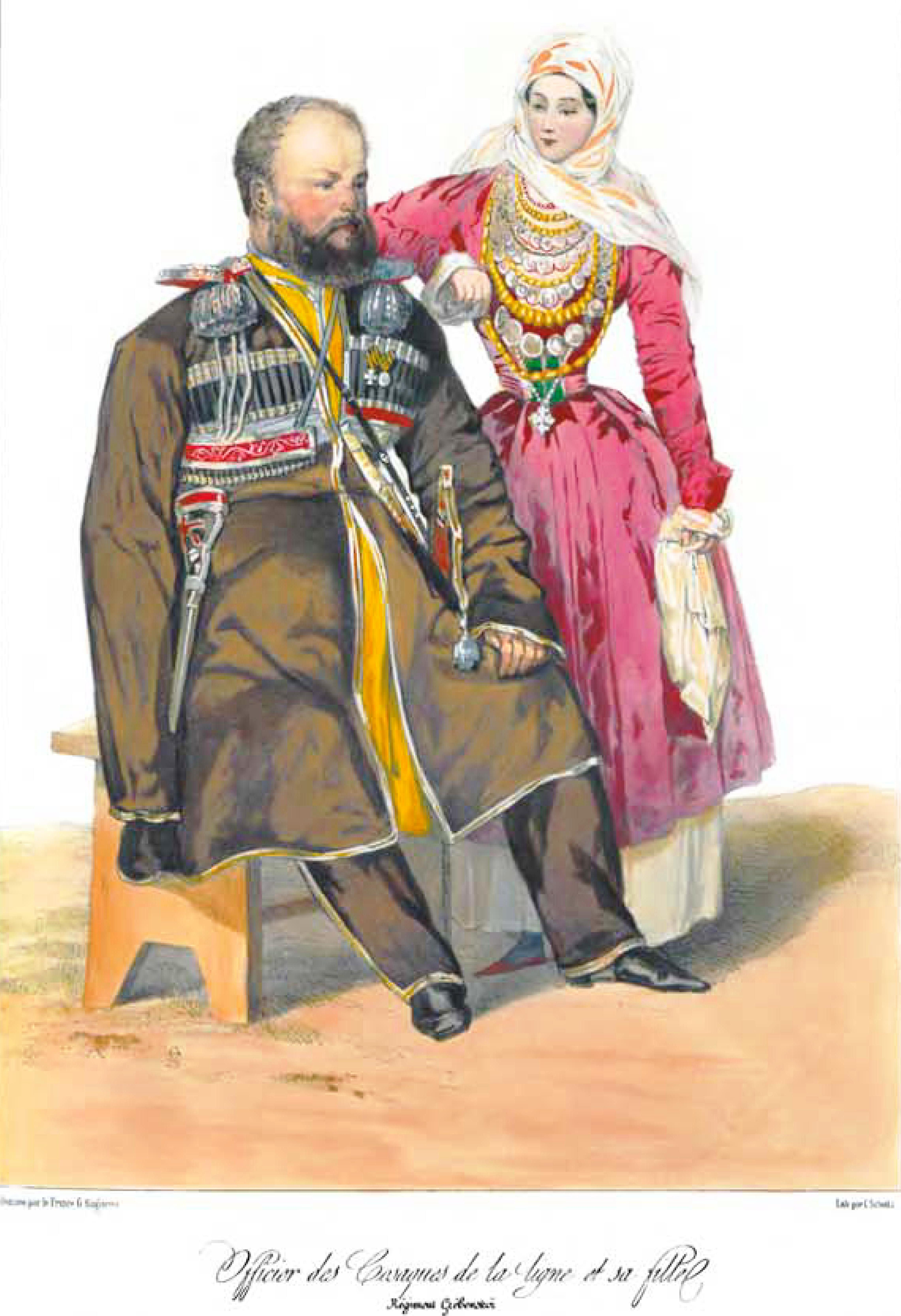
Scenes, landscapes, customs and costumes of the Caucasus drawn from nature by Prince G. Gagarin.

The Grebensky Cossacks or Grebentsy was a group of Cossacks formed in the 16th century from Don Cossacks who left the Don area and settled in the northern foothills of the Caucasus. The Greben Cossacks are part of the Terek Cossacks. They were influenced by Chechen and Nogai culture and most were bilingual in the Russian language and the Nogai language.

== Name ==
According to the article on Grebentsy in ЭСБЕ (1893), whose author — a writer V. E. Rudakov — is referring to some historians, who, in turn, allegedly relied on materials from «Book to the Big Drawing» and the legend of the Grebensky icon (Note: Legend under the early Ryazan Metropolitan Stefan Yavorsky.), claimed that Grebensky Cossacks descended from the Don Cossacks who settled in the Caucasus, whose community originally lived in the interfluve Seversky Donets and Kalitva near a hill called the Grebensky mountains, hence the name of these Cossacks — Grebensky.

== General information ==
=== Settlement territory ===
Modern scholars have no information about the settlement area of Grebentsy on the right side of the Terek River (old Russian Terka / Terki). Basic facts about these Cossacks appear after their relocation to the left bank of the river. In 1712 (Note: According to the "Chronicle of the Guards Cossack Units" of 1912, the Grebens moved from the right bank of the Terek to the left earlier - in 1711.) the Grebensky Cossacks moved to the left bank of the Terek River in the area of the fortification of the Terka / Terki (Note: There is a mistake in the "Soviet Military Encyclopedia": instead of a Terka/Terki a fortification-fortress, to which the Grebens moved, named a Tarka.) (Sunzhensky fortification).

== Bibliography ==
- Казачьи войска (Хроники гвардейскихъ казачьихъ частей помѣщены въ книгѣ ИМПЕРАТОРСКАЯ Гвардія). СПб.: Справочная книжка ИМПЕРАТОРСКОЙ Главной Квартиры. 1912.. Подъ редакціей В. К. Шенкъ, составилъ В. Х. Казинъ
- "Гребенские казаки". Советская военная энциклопедия [в 8 томах]. Vol. 3 (Гражданская — Йокота) (Министерство обороны СССР. Институт военной истории ed.). Moscow: Воениздат. 1977.. Председатель Гл. ред. комиссии Н. В. Огарков
- V. E. Rudakov [in Russian] (1893). "Гребенцы, или гребенскіе казаки". In K. K. Arsenyev (ed.). Brockhaus and Efron Encyclopedic Dictionary. Vol. IX^{A} (Гравилатъ — Давенантъ). Saint Petersburg: publishing house F. A. Brockhaus and I. A. Efron. pp. 585–586.
- Wixman. The Peoples of the USSR p. 51.
