= Goyty =

Goyty Гойты ГӀойтӀа
- Selo
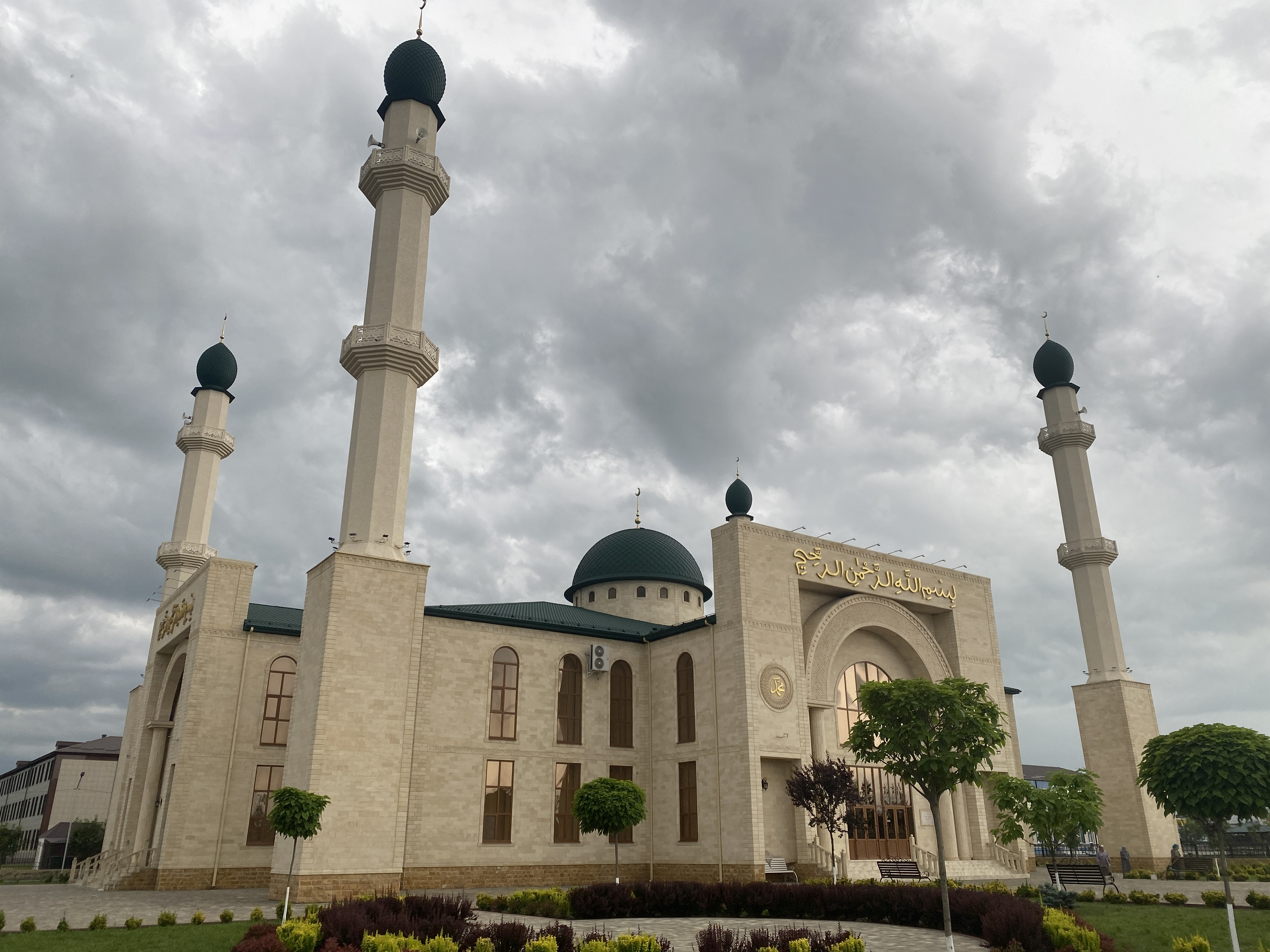
- Goyty Mosque

- Location within Chechnya Location within Russia
- Coordinates: 43°09′51″N 45°37′20″E
- Country: Russia
- Region: Chechnya
- District: Urus-Martanovsky District
- Time zone: UTC+3:00

Goyty (Russian: Гойты, Chechen: ГӀойтӀа, Ġoytha) is a rural locality (a selo) in Goytinskoye Rural Settlement of Urus-Martanovsky District, in Chechnya, Russia. Population: 16,177 (2010 census); 13,221 (2002 census);
