= Dalkhan Khozhaev =

Chechen author, fighter

Dalkhan Abdulazizovich Khozhaev

Personal details
- Born: 18 April 1961 Grozny, Chechen-Ingush ASSR, USSR
- Died: 26 July 2000 (aged 39) Valerik, Achkhoy-Martanovsky District, Chechnya, North Caucasus
- Awards: Qoman Siy

Military service
- Allegiance: Chechen Republic of Ichkeria
- Years of service: 1994 - 2000
- Rank: Brigadier General
- Battles/wars: First Chechen War: Battle of Grozny (1994-1995); Second Chechen war: Battle of Grozny (1999-2000)

Dalkhan Abdulazizovich Khozhaev (18 April 1961 – 26 July 2000) was a Chechen historian, field commander, brigadier general and author with numerous works on the centuries-old confrontation between Chechnya and Russia, as well as the First Chechen War. He commanded a special brigade and was loyal to Ruslan Gelayev.

== Early life ==
Dalkhan Khozhaev was born on 18 April 1961 in Grozny into the Chechen teip of Benoy. Dalkhan's father Abdul-Aziz Khozhaev was a commercial worker and his mother Zura Bibulatova was a Chechen and Russian language teacher. Both of his parents came from Novye Atagi. In 1983 he graduated from the faculty of History of the Chechen-Ingush State University.

Between 1985 and 1991, he was a methodologist of the station of young tourists, as well as a researcher at the Chechen-Ingush Republican Regional Museum.

== Works ==
He was the author of works on the history of the national liberation movement of Chechnya in the 19th century. As well as the Head of the Archives Department, which was later destroyed. Since 1994 he was a member of the Cabinet of Ministers and as well as the State Defense Council of the Chechen Republic of Ichkeria.

== Death ==
On the night of 26 July 2000 in the village of Valerik, Khozhaev was shot dead by a sniper while staying the night with some relatives in a private household. The Russian military was blamed for the killing, but denied their involvement in his death. The federal forces believed that Arbi Barayev, a longtime enemy of Ruslan Gelayev, was involved in the killing. Possibly due to Dalkhan's loyalty to Ruslan Gelayev.
