= North Caucasus Line =

Russian forts and Cossack settlements

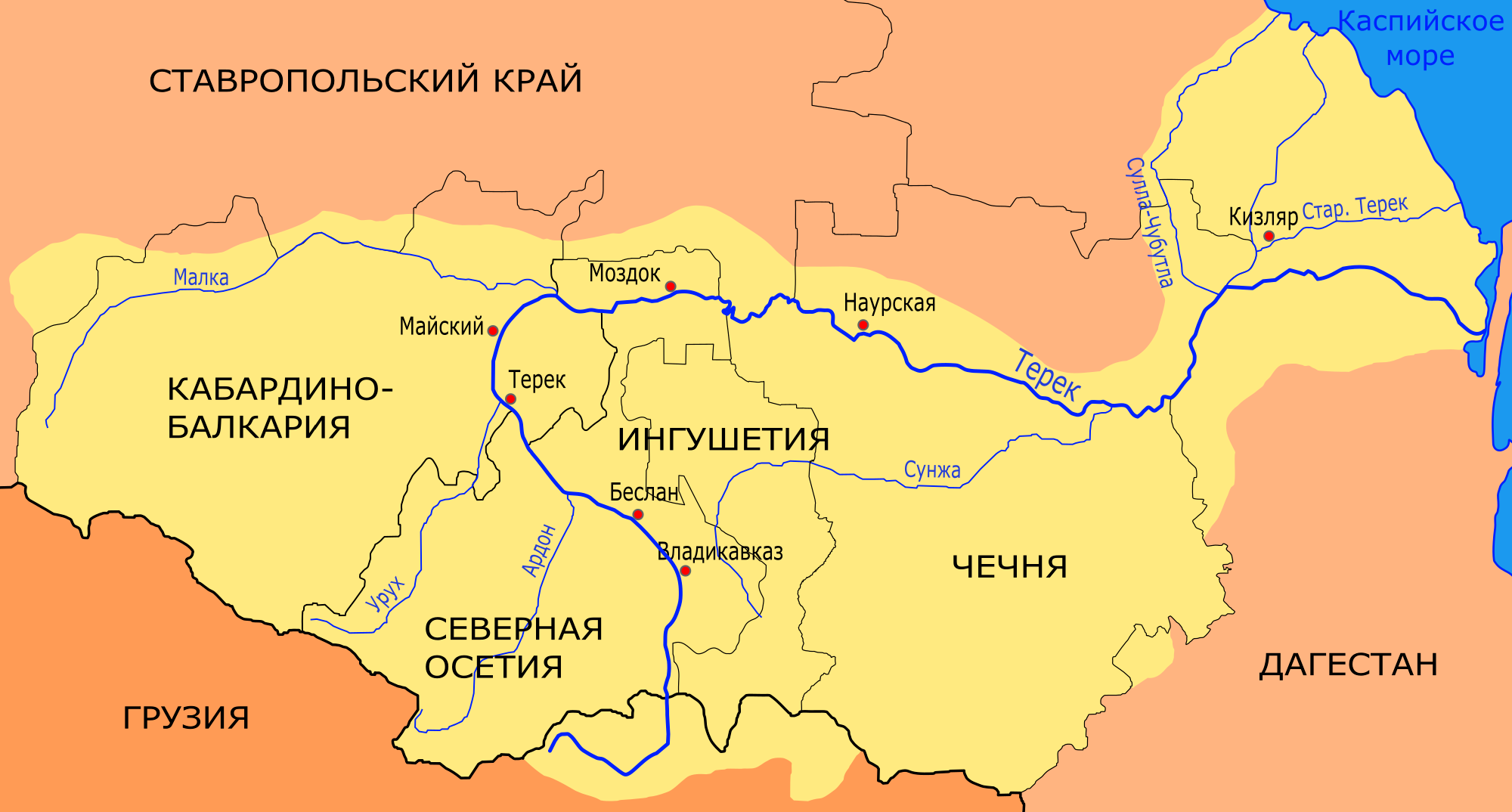
The Terek drains the northeast Caucasus into the Caspian Sea. The Malka is its northwest tributary and the Sunzha River is inside the great bend of the Terek.

The Kuban drains the northwest Caucasus rivers into the Sea of Azov. The Laba is the fourth river from the left.

The North Caucasus Line (Russian: Кавказская линия) was a line of Russian forts and Cossack settlements along the north side of the Caucasus Mountains. Originating in the mid-16th century with a small number of free Cossacks near the Caspian Sea, from the mid-18th century the line was pushed west and used as a base to conquer the mountains to the south and to settle the steppes to the north.

== Background ==
=== Geography ===
The distribution of Cossack settlements was determined by three roughly parallel lines. The first was the line between the Caucasus foothills and the lowlands. The second was the line between forest and steppe. It is difficult to trace this line, as much of the forest has been cleared for agriculture, but it is clear that a belt of forest steppe extended north of the foothills onto the plain. The third line was marked by three, and later five, rivers. In the east, the Terek River catches the rivers that flow north from the Caucasus and drains them into the Caspian. In the west, the Kuban River drains the Caucasus rivers west into the Sea of Azov. In the center, the Malka River catches the mountain rivers and flows east into the Terek. The Terek, Malka, and Kuban made a natural military line. Later two other rivers became important. The Terek first flows north, turns somewhat west, and makes a bend before flowing east. Inside this bend, the Sunzha River flows northeast into the Terek and catches most of the mountain rivers. Once the Terek was controlled, it became the next military line. In the west, the Kuban also flows north before swinging west. Inside this curve, the north-flowing Laba River was the next military line.

In the east, along the Terek, the soil is poor and rainfall is low. Dense peasant settlement became possible only when the line was pushed west to the Stavropol highland in the center in the late 18th century.

Around 1500, Russia began to push south from its heartland in Muscovy. Everything south of the Black Sea and the Caucasus was controlled by the Nogai nomads. In 1556, Russia moved down the Volga, capturing Astrakhan at the north end of the Caspian Sea. The land south of the Terek along the Caspian Sea was controlled by various Khanates nominally subject to Persia, the northernmost of which later became the Shamkhalate of Tarki.

=== Caucasus Cossacks ===
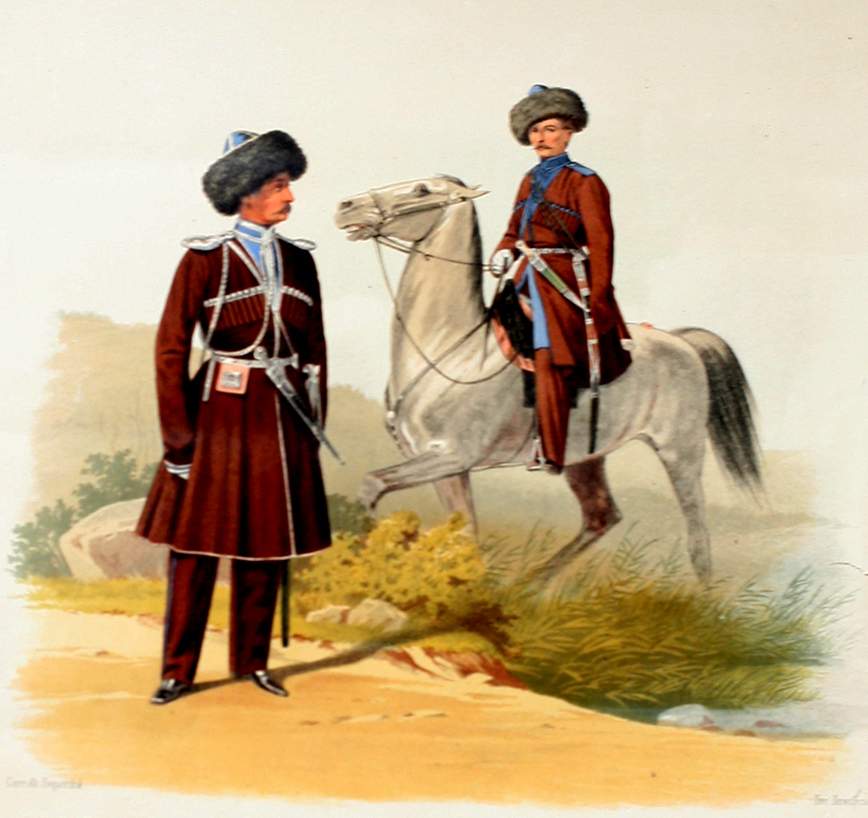
A Terek Cossack about 1860. His uniform copies the native dress, the caucasian burka: papakha, cherkeska with gazerei and kinzhal

Cossacks lived all along the southern Russian frontier; most were of non-Russian ancestry. Originally runaway serfs and adventurers who went to the frontier to live a free life, they were gradually brought under government control by being hired as mercenaries. By the later period, the Cossack was basically a fighting farmer who supported himself but was available for military service. Their usual duties were guarding villages against raiders, protecting convoys, especially along the Georgian Military Road, and serving as auxiliaries to the regular army. Cossack villages attracted locals who were slowly absorbed into the Cossack community. Georgians and Armenians moved to the north side of the mountains, some of them becoming Cossacks. In 1829, vagrants (brodyagi) were rounded up and made to work in Cossack villages for three years, after which they might become Cossacks. Although they normally had to be Orthodox, a number of Cossacks, including military officers, were Muslim. They adopted the local dress and economic methods. Horses and weapons were often bought from the mountaineers. In 1828, Cossacks were forbidden to approach peasants working in the fields because they could not be distinguished from native raiders. Raiding between Cossacks and natives was common. The local people also raided each other, but reports of Cossacks raiding other Cossacks are few. When they were not raiding each other there was a good deal of economic and personal interaction. This was especially true in the early period, in which there were many free Cossacks, whom the government were unaware of. In 1744, the Greben Cossacks had 450 men but could round up 1,500 more if they recruited using financial incentives. Free Cossacks usually appear in the records as “criminal fugitive Cossacks” when they engaged in raiding or piracy. Before the Russian state began a serious attempt at conquest in the early 19th century, the Caucasus Cossacks were almost another local tribe.

== History ==
=== c. 1550–1711: Early Settlements ===
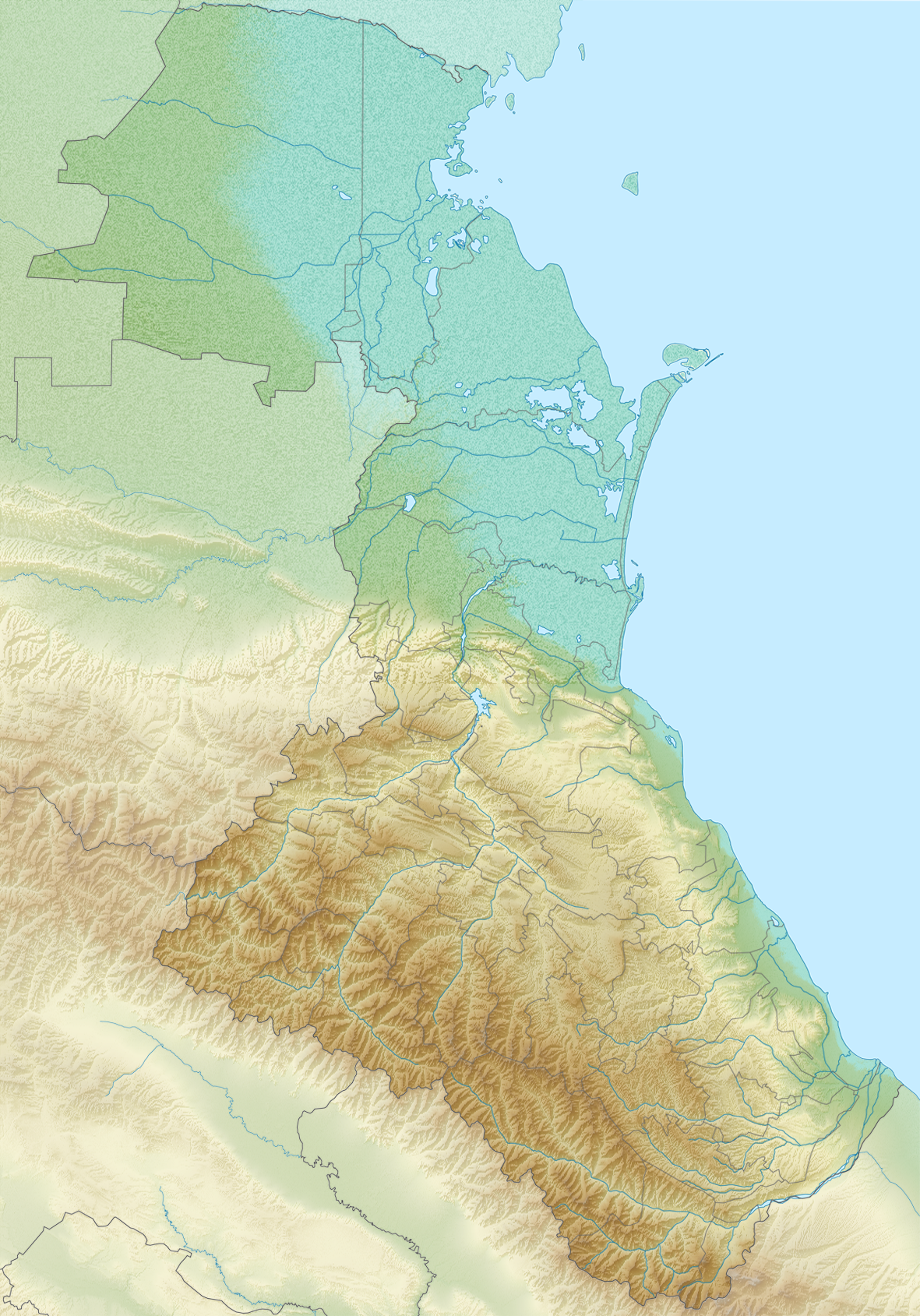
Early forts on a map of Dagestan
= Terek River with delta
= Sunzha River

Free Cossacks were living on the lower Terek by the first half of the 16th century. The usual dates are 1520 and 1563, but the matter is very obscure. To the west of the Terek Cossacks lived the Greben Cossacks. They were formally distinguished in 1736. Before that date, a distinction between Greben and Terek Cossacks is questionable. Few records are available from this period, those which do exist pertain mostly to matters of warfare.

Early forts: In 1556, Russia occupied Astrakhan at the head of the Caspian Sea and began interacting with Kabardia in the center of the North Caucasus. In 1567, Sunzha Ostrog (1567–1579) was built at the mouth of the Sunzha at the east end of Kabardian territory. It moved several times. It was abandoned under Turkish pressure in 1571, rebuilt in 1578, then was abandoned again the following year. In 1588 Tersky Gorod (1588–1722) was founded in the Terek delta. In 1623, it had 500 Cossacks on the government payroll. By the late 17th century, it is said to have had a population of 20,000, mostly non-Russian. In 1708, it was burned by "Kuban Tatars". It was abandoned in 1722. In 1635, Sunzha Ostrog (1635–1653) was restored. In 1653 Persia forced its abandonment (the so-called Russo-Persian War (1651-1653)).

Early Wars: Russian relations with Kabardia were more diplomatic than militaristic. In 1560, four years after the capture of Astrakhan, Cheremisinov attacked Tarki, burned it and withdrew. In 1594, Prince Khvorostinin led 5,000 Terek, Astrakhan and Yaik Cossacks south to attack Tarki, but was soundly defeated. Later on in 1604–05, Ivan Buturlin attacked Tarki as well, but was also defeated. In both of these conflicts, the Dagestanis allowed the Russians to take the town, only to surround, harass, and attack them when they were forced to retreat. The first war was requested by the Kabardians and the last two by the Georgian kings who did nothing to help. In 1605, the rebel Ilya Muromets was on the Terek. In 1614, some Terek Cossacks helped attack Ivan Zarutsky at Astrakhan. In the 1680s, 1,500 Don Cossack Old Believers settled on the Kuma River.

=== 1711–1763: the Russian state gains control of the Cossacks ===
Around 1711, the Greben Cossacks moved to a more defensible position on the north bank of the Terek. In 1717, some 500 of them participated in Prince Alexander Bekovich-Cherkassky's campaign against the Khanate of Khiva in Central Asia. Only two returned. In 1720, the Greben Cossacks were placed under the governor of Astrakhan, then under the Russian War College (Russian: Военная коллегия) the following year. In 1722, the Russian Emperor Peter the Great tried to conquer the west side of the Caspian Sea. The entire garrison of Tersky Gorod was moved 130 miles south to Svyatoy Krest (Holy Cross) Fort (1722–1736) on the lower Sulak River. Tersky Gorod was abandoned and only the Greben Cossacks remained on the Terek. In 1723-24, 1,000 families of Don Cossacks were moved to the Sulak and its Agrakhan branch, forming the Agrakhan Cossack Host. Svyatoy Krest was too far advanced and even more unhealthy than the lower Terek. When it was abandoned in 1735–36, only 200 of its garrison had survived to be moved to the new fort at Kizlyar. The Cossacks who moved back north became the Terek-Semeinoe Host (between the Greben Cossacks and Kizlyar) and the Terek-Kizlyar Host (east of Kizlyar on the lower Terek). The Terek-Kizlyar Host had the worst land and less than 200 men on active duty. About a third of them were converted natives. The Terek-Semeinoe Host had about 450 men for most of the period, most of whom were descended from Don Cossacks. They were merged with the Greben Cossacks in 1745 and separated again in 1755. Kizlyar (1735–present) was founded on the Terek when Svyatoy Krest was abandoned and remained the largest Russian town in the Caucasus until Stavropol surpassed it in the early 19th century. In 1773, Kizlyar had a garrison of 1,277 men and a civilian and Cossack population of 4,197. Only 8% of the population was Russian. The town had three Orthodox churches, one monastery, four mosques, and one Armenian church.

=== 1763–1864: Westward expansion, massive peasant colonization and war in the mountains ===
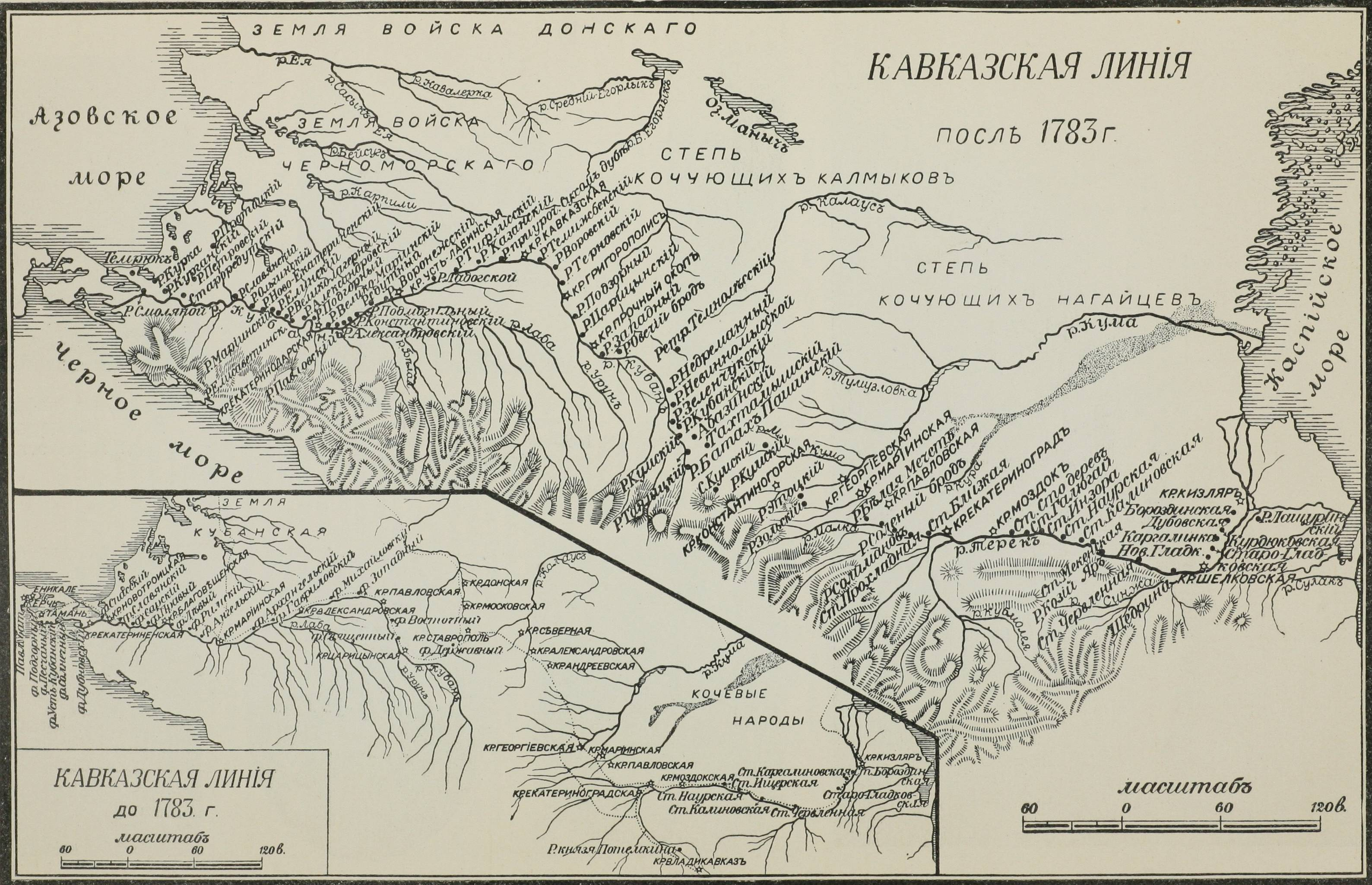
North Caucasus Line

In the mid-18th century, there were only 1,162 active-duty Cossacks in the North Caucasus. By 1851, there were 86,538.

Westward expansion was associated with the annexation of Georgia south of the mountains. In 1769, Totleben crossed the mountains to fight the Turks. In 1783, eastern Georgia became a Russian protectorate, and in 1800 it was annexed. Since the only good road south was through Darial Pass, the Russians had to hold what would later become the Georgian Military Highway. Mozdok (1763–present) at the north end of the highway was founded in 1763. In 1770, it became a fortress independent of Kizlyar. It quickly attracted a large native population, many of whom were fugitive serfs from the mountains. In 1765, the Mozdok Mountain Command was formed from converted natives. They were used mostly for convoy duty along the Military Highway. Ossets were encouraged to settle along the highway and efforts were made to re-convert them (many had formerly been Christians). There was a gap of about 65 miles between Mozdok and the westernmost Greben Cossacks. From 1770 to 1799, this area was settled by Don and Volga Cossacks. Vladikavkaz, at the north end of the pass, was founded in 1784. It was partly abandoned at the time of Sheikh Mansur and was re-established in 1803.

In 1777, Russia began building a line of forts between Mozdok and Azov. In that year, Stavropol and Georgievsk were founded along this line (Georgievsk was the seat of the Caucasus Governorate from 1802 to 1822). That same year, the Volga regiment was formed from Volga Cossacks on the eastern part of this line. Each new fort became a magnet for both legal and illegal settlers. 68,000 peasants were settled in 1781–84, and 68,000 more by the end of the century.

Far to the west, in 1708, the Nekrasov Cossacks settled on the Kuban. They were refugees from the Bulavin Rebellion and lived in Crimean-Nogai territory. They seem to have gradually broken up and merged with other groups. In 1783, the same year that Georgia became a Russian vassal, Russia annexed the Khanate of Crimea and thereby inherited its claim over the Nogai nomads. In 1787, the Black Sea Cossack Host was given the land between Azov and the Kuban. By 1794, 25,000 people had settled along the Kuban. Krasnodar was founded in 1794. The Kuban line became the base for the Russo-Circassian War. The line was pushed west to the Laba River.

In the center, the line was pushed south from the Terek to the Sunzha. Grozny was founded in 1818. In 1824, general Aleksey Yermolov created the Mountain Cossack regiment between the Volga and Mozdok regiments. These new "Cossacks" were created by decree, the government declaring that various Cossacks, state peasants, and natives were now Cossacks. During the Murid War, Chechens were driven north or south of the two rivers. The Sunzha Regiment was founded in 1845.

During the Russo-Circassian War (until 1864) in the west and the Murid War (1830–1859) in the east, the line was the northern base for the conquest of the mountains. When the fighting ended, the Cossacks were no longer needed for local fighting, but they remained a rather distinct community.

A proper account of peasant settlement north of the line on the Black Sea-Caspian Steppe would require census figures which do not seem to exist.

== See also ==
- Russian conquest of the Caucasus
- Terek Cossacks
- Kuban Cossacks
- Caucasus Line Cossack Host
- North Caucasus Railway

== References and notes ==
- Thomas M. Barrett, At the Edge of Empire: The Terek Cossacks and the North Caucasus Frontier 1700–1860, 1999
- Arthur Tsutsiev, Atlas of the Ethno-Political History of the Caucasus, 201419th-century
