= Astemir Karabulaksky =

Prominent figure in the Caucasian War

Astemir
- Аьстамар
- Military career
- Allegiance: Caucasian Imamate
- Rank: Naib
- Conflicts: Caucasian War: Insurgency in the North Caucasus (1825-1826); Raids on Caucasian Line (Note: See #Raids.)

Astemir (Chechen/Ingush: Аьстамар, romanized: Ästamar; fl. 1822–1825) was an Orstkhoy outlaw (abrek) and governor (naib) in Caucasian Imamate. Astemir was the companion and brother-in-law of Beibulat Taimiev. In 1825, even participating in uprising of Chechnya. He was a prominent figure, leading the units of outlaws in raids on the Imperial Russian Caucasian Line.

== Background ==
Astemir was of Orstkhoy ethnic background. (Note: Historically Orstkhoy were described either as a Chechen or an Ingush tribe, sometimes as an independent Vainakh ethnic group. See also Orstkhoy#General information.) Astemir was married to the sister of Beibulat Taimiev, therefore he was his brother-in-law. The family lived in a slum in a dense forest, at the foot of the Black Mountains, eight versts away from the small village of Uzeni-Yurt, located on the banks of Argun River. He used Uzeni-Yurt as his meeting place to gather outlaws for his raids.

== Raids ==
In 1822, Astemir with his detachment failed to rob the Grozny fortress and steal the livestock – he instead rushed to Stary-Yurt and evicted 191 families out, together with all their livestock and property. Aleksey Yermolov was outraged by the accident and commanded Nikolai Grekov to burn down all the empty houses of Stary-Yurt. He also blamed the commendant of redoubt of Stary-Yurt for his inaction; Nikolai Grekov and Artamon Chernov were also blamed.

After the successful victory of Beibulat Taimiev at Khankala Gorge in 1825 against Russian forces under leadership of Sorchan, he planned to take control of the Grozny fortress. Thus, Astemir with a hundred men made an expedition to the Nadterechny villages, while Beibulat made one to Nazran. This operation utterly failed as Nadterechny Chechens didn't rise up and Astemir retreated beyond Sunzha River with a small amount of livestock stolen.

On Summer of 1827, Astemir helped Beibulat Taimiev gather a partisan detachment of 700 men. The detachment later on the 21 of August of the same year destroyed a Cossack outpost on Terek River and on the 17 of September tried to take control of Grozny but were defeated.

== See also ==
- Groznaya Expedition (1827)

== Bibliography ==
- Anchabadze, G. Z. (2009). Gelashvili, N. (ed.). The Vainakhs (the Chechen and Ingush) (PDF). Translated by Paichadze, T. (2nd ed.). Tbilisi: Kavkasiuri saxli. pp. 1–122.
- Dubrovin, N. F. (1891). "Из истории войны и владычества русских на Кавказе (Кази-мулла, как родоначальник мюридизма и газавата)" [From the history of war and Russian rule in the Caucasus (Kazi-mullah as the founder of muridism and ghazavat)]. Voenny Sbornik (in Russian). No. 3. SPb.: Tip. Gl. upr. udelov.
- Karpeev, I. V. (1997). "Абреки" [Abreks]. In Kaziev, Sh. M.; et al. (eds.). Шамиль: Иллюстрированная энциклопедия [Shamil: Illustrated Encyclopedia] (in Russian). Mosvka: Ēkho Kavkaza. pp. 169–170. ISBN 5-900054-01-2.
- Potto, V. A. (1889). Кавказская Война, Tom. 5: Время Паскевича, или Бунт Чечни [Caucasian War, Vol. 5: The Time of Paskevich, or the Revolt of Chechnya] (in Russian). Tiflis: Tip. Okruzhnogo shtaba Kavkazskogo veonnogo okruga. pp. 1–320 – via Wikisource.
- Potto, V. A.; Anosov, N. S.; Tomkeev, V. I. (1904). Potto, V. A. (ed.). Утверждение русского владычества на Кавказе [The assertion of Russian rule in the Caucasus]. Vol. 3: Part 1. Tiflis: Tip. shtaba Kavkazskogo veonnogo okruga. pp. 1–527.
