= Groznaya Raid (1825) =

1825 Military Conflict between Chechnya and the Russian Empire

- Part of of the Insurgency in the North Caucasus (1825-1826) of the Caucasian War
- Design of the Groznaya Fortress during the Caucasian War.
| Date | 10 September [O.S. 29 August] 1825 |
| Location | Groznaya Fortress and Mamakaev Village, Sunzha Line, Russian Empire (Modern-day Grozny and Alkhan-Churt, Chechnya) 43°18′43″N 45°41′20″E |
| Result | Chechen Victory |
| Territorial changes | Chechen fighters occupy the fortress barracks before retreating. |

Belligerents
| Chechnya | Russian Empire |

Commanders and leaders
| (Chechnya) Bey-Bulat Taymiev | (Russian Empire) Terenty Sorochan (Russian Empire) Second Lieutenant Zhigalov |

Units involved
| Chechen fighters from Kurchaloy, Dikhi, Urus-Martan, Atagi, Karabulak Martan and Khankala. | Groznaya Garrison: 41st Jaeger Regiment; 2nd Carabinier Company; 4th, 5th and 6th Jaeger Regiment Companies; 43rd Jaeger Regiment; 1st Carabinier Company; 1st, 2nd, 3rd, 8th and 9th Jaeger Regiment Companies; 36 cannons |

Strength
| Total: 120 Horsemen; 2 Columns: Bey-Bulat Taymiev; Unknown; Russian Claim: 2,000 (Strongly exaggerated) | 2,722 (Note: Strength of Groznaya between the end of 1825 and beginning of 1826.) 36 cannons |

Casualties and losses
| Total: 18; 8 KIA; 1 POW; 9 WIA; 5 rifles captured | Total: 9; 1 KIA; 8 WIA; 1 Senior Officer; 7 Lower Ranks |
- Location of the Groznaya Fortress in modern-day Chechnya.

The raid on Groznaya in 1825 was an attack on the Russian fortress of Groznaya by Chechen forces under the newly elected Mekhk-Da of Chechnya, Bey-Bulat Taymiev during the Caucasian War and the North Caucasian insurgency of 1825–1826. On the night of 29 August 1825, Taymiev advanced from Khankala towards the fortress with his men. A force of 120 men, divided into two columns, attacked the lunette and an outpost. The raiders briefly occupied the barracks before smashing through the main gate and withdrawing.

The raid was primarily intended as a symbolic and demonstrative action. Shortly afterward, Taymiev met with Chechen elders and presented the attack as evidence that a relatively small force could strike a major Russian fortress. This helped persuade the elders to provide additional fighters and supplies. The raid strengthened rebel morale and support for Taymiev's insurgency, while also exposing weaknesses in Groznaya's outer defenses, which were reinforced soon afterward.

== Background ==
By late summer 1825, the uprising in Chechnya had continued despite the setbacks suffered by the insurgents during the fighting around Gerzel-Aul. After a split among the rebel leadership in July, Bey-Bulat Taymiev gathered new supporters and formed a force of about 2,000 men, which moved through Shali, Khankala, Lesser Chechnya, Goyty and Gekhi. Russian forces on the Left Flank of the North Caucasus Line had been weakened by the preceding months of fighting, while the scale of the uprising prompted Aleksey Yermolov to return to Chechnya and concentrate available troops there.

Groznaya, situated on the Sunzha, was one of the principal Russian fortresses in Chechnya and an important base for operations into the surrounding region. By August, Taymiev's forces were increasingly active in the area between Lesser Chechnya and the Khankala Gorge, bringing the insurgency into the immediate vicinity of the fortress.

== Prelude ==
On 23 August, Taymiev appeared near Stary-Yurt with about 300 men, intending to attack the Russian fortification there. Detachments sent from Groznaya with two guns prevented him from crossing the Sunzha, after which he dispersed most of his force. During the following days, Taymiev concentrated on organizing the villages supporting the uprising. Turgaks were appointed in Atagi and Dikhi, while local contingents were ordered to remain ready for further operations. The inhabitants of Khankala were instructed to strengthen the gorge, maintain pickets and disrupt communications with Groznaya, while a selected force of 500 horsemen was to be kept in constant readiness.

The Russian command meanwhile anticipated an attack on Groznaya. Because the fortress's fortified suburb was considered weakly defended, Yermolov sent two companies of the 41st Jäger Regiment to reinforce it. On 29 August, Taymiev assembled about 400 men in Lesser Chechnya and arrived at Khankala that evening.

== Raid ==
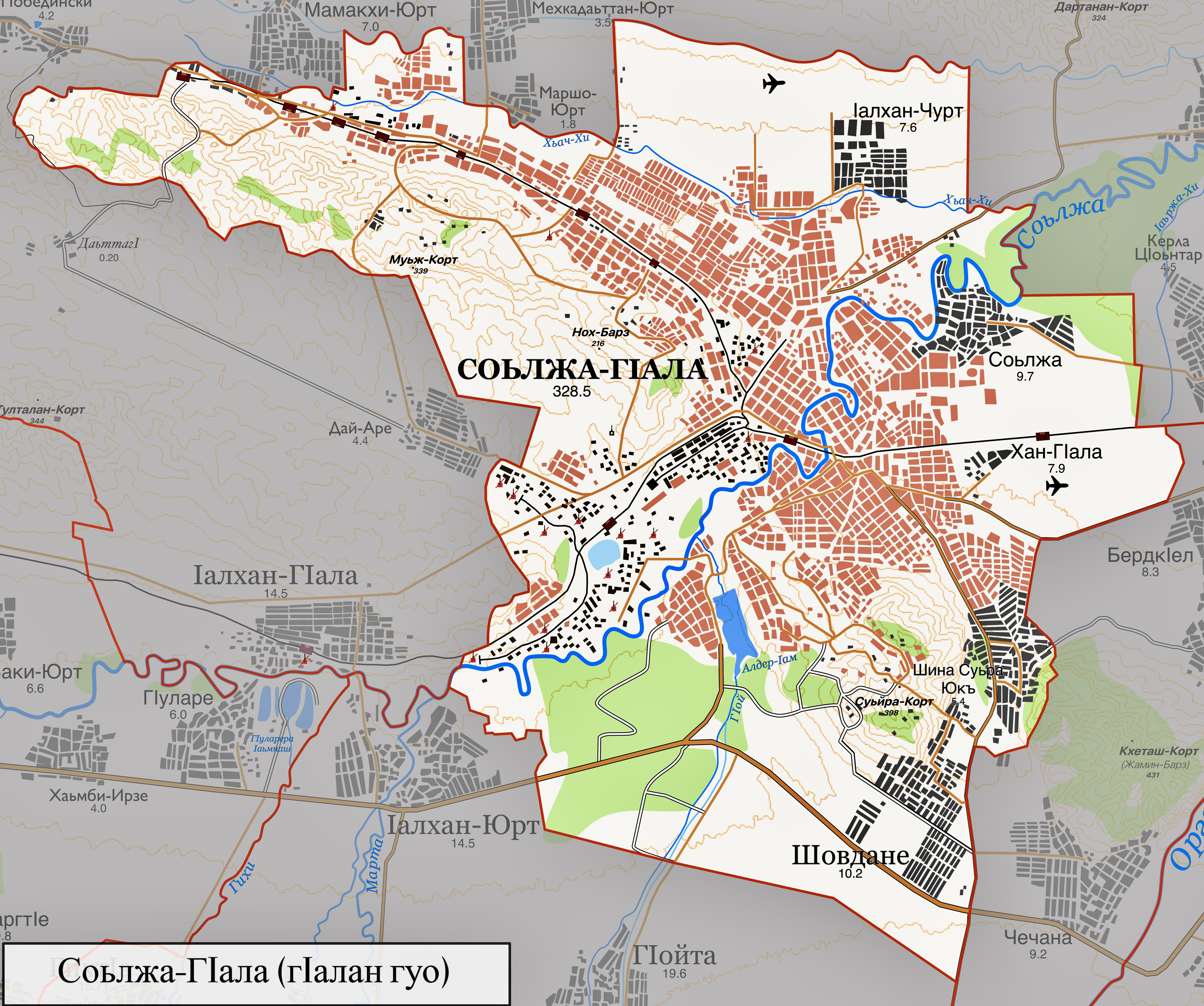
Modern map of Grozny. Alkhan-Churt can be seen Northeast of the city.

After reinforcing his army with men from the Khankala gorge, Bey-Bulat advanced under cover of darkness to the outskirts of the Groznaya Fortress. There, 120 selected horsemen were chosen for a reconnaissance-in-force mission. Bey-Bulat divided them into two columns of 60 men each and personally commanded one of the columns.

=== Diversionary Attack ===
Bey-Bulat sent the second column toward a fortification on the outskirts of Groznaya near the village of Mamakaev (Note: Near modern-day Alkhan-Churt. Some scholars also locate Mamakaev near modern-day Pervomayskaya.) to carry out a diversionary attack and draw the garrison's attention away from the main assault.

Under cover of darkness, the raiders approached the position and crawled toward a concealed Russian guard post near an angular artillery battery by Mamakaev. The sentries detected the approaching party and opened fire before it could reach the position. Once discovered, the raiders charged the defenses with a battle cry, but were met by musket fire from the night guard and grapeshot from the Russian artillery.

Unable to break through the defenses, the diversionary column withdrew under fire.

=== Main Attack ===
Trained mountain scouts secretly infiltrated the fortress and opened its gates, allowing the main assault column under Taymiev to enter the fortress Lunette. The Chechens then attacked the soldiers' Barracks, which were empty because the garrison, having been warned of a possible attack, had already taken up positions on the walls.

After leaving the barracks, the Chechens encountered a night guard commanded by Second Lieutenant Zhigalov. The guards opened fire before engaging them in Hand-to-hand combat with their Bayonets. Taymiev's men drew their sabres and daggers and fought their way through the Russian troops, moving in mounted formation from one end of the fortress to the other while firing and striking at soldiers in their path. Upon reaching the exit gate on the opposite side of the fortress, the raiders forced it open and rode out.

The main Chechen force positioned near Groznaya was unable to support the raiders inside the fortress after being discovered by the garrison and coming under artillery fire from both the front and the extension battery.

== Aftermath ==
=== Casualties ===
On the Russian side, one artilleryman was killed during the fighting in the Lunette. One officer was wounded by a dagger, while seven lower-ranking soldiers were also wounded.

On the Chechen side, eight fighters were killed and ten were wounded. One of the wounded was captured by Russian soldiers. Another wounded fighter was a Karabulak from the village of Karabulak Martan, whom N. A. Volkonsky described as “a well-known swindler”. Of the eight killed, three were left behind in the fortress. Russian soldiers also recovered five rifles.

=== Immediate Aftermath ===
Following the retreat from Groznaya, Bey-Bulat Taymiev arrived in Atagi on the evening of 30 August, where he held a large meeting with elders and other local leaders. He spoke about the success of the operation, emphasized the small size of the force that had managed to break into the fortress, and called on the mountain people to rally under his banner before the beginning of autumn and the expected Russian counteroffensive. He argued that if such a small force could achieve so much, a larger army could capture Groznaya, after which their authority would once again extend as far as the Terek River.

=== Significance and Chechen Reaction ===
The attack has been interpreted as a demonstrative, propagandistic and psychological operation, or as a reconnaissance-in-force, rather than a serious attempt to capture the Groznaya fortress. Its purpose was to demonstrate that a small force could successfully challenge a larger, better-armed and fortified enemy.

The meeting at Atagi on 30 August resulted in an agreement to attack Groznaya a second time, this time with the participation of forces from Lesser Chechnya. The planned attack did not take place, however, because Bey-Bulat became concerned about the strength of his support among the Endirey Kumyks, particularly because of the presence of Alexey Yermolov at the Vnezapnaya Fortress. After sending one of his supporters to investigate, Bey-Bulat learned that the Endireyans remained supportive and were waiting for him to arrive with an army. The subsequent campaign toward Endirey nevertheless failed to produce the expected uprising, as the presence of Russian troops prevented the local Kumyks from openly joining the rebellion.

=== North Caucasian Reaction ===
Russian sources also describe unrest among the Ingush people. Volkonsky reports that the Karabulaks, Galashians and many Nazranians openly supported the rebellion and were waiting for Bey-Bulat to arrive with an army. When Bey-Bulat assembled a force on 4 September for the march toward Endirey, many Karabulaks and Nazranians joined him, particularly those who had fled their homes following the execution of the rebel leader Jambulat Tsechoev.

In Dagestan, Muhammad al-Yaraghi, recently freed from captivity, continued preaching holy war against the Russian Empire: “In the name of the Prophet, I command you,” al-Yaraghi declared, “return to your homeland, gather the people, read my instructions to them, arm yourselves, and go forth on the Gazavat! ... Liberate the Muslims, your brothers.”

In Kabardia, unrest connected with the wider uprising developed into the Kabardian insurgency, during which a rebel force attacked and destroyed the Soldatskaya stanitsa on 29 September. In support of the Kabardian rebels, Bey-Bulat sent 300 Chechen horsemen on 9 October, followed by another 100 horsemen on 21 October.

=== Russian Reaction ===
The attack exposed weaknesses in Groznaya's defenses. In response, Alexey Yermolov wrote to Sorochan:

“I have received a report regarding the attack carried out by the Chechens on the lunette and, at the same time, on the outer bailey. At the former location, precautions were insufficient, for 60 Chechens should not have been able to enter unnoticed, especially since, hiding along the bank, they could only have advanced one by one. Please order Major Fedoseyev to reinforce the lunette’s enclosure with a palisade. In your spare time, order that the moat near the outer bailey be widened and deepened and that a rampart be built... Issue orders for the prompt delivery of provisions and do not delay the supply wagons by even a single minute. Please send a detachment of troops to Neftyanka to meet the transport. The jaeger companies will remain in Grozny, and you may, in turn with the others, employ them to improve the outpost’s fortifications. With this increase in your troop strength, you may conduct some patrols along the left bank of the Sunzha to monitor the behavior of the inhabitants of the villages subject to us—occasionally toward Stary Yurt, to keep it in line. It will not hurt if our Chechens living along the Terek occasionally witness troop movements and realize that there is a means of keeping them themselves in obedience… I repeat: exercise the strictest caution.”

The tsarist command later reported Bey-Bulat's force as numbering 2,000 men and described it as including Chechens, Karabulaks and Ingush. Dalkhan Khozhaev argues that this figure was exaggerated in an attempt to explain the failure to prevent the attack.

== See also ==
- Bey-Bulat Taymiev — Leader of the Chechen forces.
- Battle of Khankala (1825) — Next major battle of the war.
- Groznaya Raid (August 1825) — Bey-Bulats second (attempted) attack on Groznaya.
- Groznaya Expedition (1827) — Bey-Bulats third attack on Groznaya.

== Sources ==
=== Bibliography ===
==== Historical Works ====
- Волконский, Н. А. (1886). "Глава III and Глава IV" [Chapter 3 and Chapter 4]. In Чернявский, И. С. (ed.). Война на Восточном Кавказе с 1824 по 1834 г. в связи с мюридизмом [The War in the Eastern Caucasus from 1824 to 1834 in Connection with Muridism]. Кавказский сборник (in Russian). Vol. 10. Тифлис: Типография Окружного штаба Кавказского военного округа. pp. 97–184 – via DrevLit.
- Эсадзе, С. С. (1909). "Глава II" [Chapter 2]. Штурм Гуниба и пленение Шамиля: Исторический очерк Кавказско-горской войны в Чечне и Дагестане [The Storming of Gunib and Capture of Shamil: A Historical Sketch of the Caucasian Mountain War in Chechnya and Dagestan] (in Russian). Тифлис: Военно-исторический отдел; Типография штаба Кавказского военного округа. pp. 23–42 – via Электронная библиотека ГПИБ.

==== Modern Scholarship ====
===== Russian =====
- Ахмадов, Я. З.; Хасмагомадов, Э. Х. (2005). "Глава II. Чечня в первой трети XIX века. Взаимоотношения с Российской империей" [Chapter 2. Chechnya in the first third of the 19th century. Relations with the Russian Empire]. История Чечни в XIX-XX веках [History of Chechnya in the 19th-20th Centuries]. История Чечни с древнейших времен до конца XVIII века (in Russian). Москва: Пульс. pp. 40–122. ISBN 5-93486-046-1 – via eLIBRARY.RU.
- Хожаев, Д. А. (1998). "Тайми Биболт" [Taymi Bibolt]. In Мазаева, Тамара (ed.). Чеченцы в Русско-Кавказской войне [Chechens in the Russo-Caucasian War] (in Russian). Грозный–Санкт-Петербург: Седа. pp. 45–59. ISBN 5-85973-012-8. Archived from the original on 22 December 2014.
- Тесаев, З. А. (2020). "Таймиев Бей-Булат (1779–1831)" [Taymiev Bey-Bulat (1779–1831)] (PDF). In Гапуров, Ш. А.; Магамадов, С. С. (eds.). Исторические личности Чечни (XI–XXI вв.) [Historical Personalities of Chechnya (11th–21st Centuries)] (PDF) (in Russian). Vol. 1, Book 1: Political and Public Figures. Грозный: АО «Издательско-полиграфический комплекс „Грозненский рабочий“». pp. 169–176. ISBN 978-5-4314-0422-1 – via eLIBRARY.RU.

===== English =====
- Gammer, Moshe (2006). "Chapter 4: The Beginning of the Caucasian War". The Lone Wolf and the Bear: Three Centuries of Chechen Defiance of Russian Rule. Pitt Series in Russian and East European Studies. Pittsburgh, Pennsylvania: University of Pittsburgh Press. pp. 31–44. ISBN 0-8229-5898-8. OCLC 62329896. OL 22724688M – via Open Library.

==== Articles ====
===== Russian =====
- Головлёв, А. А. (2017). "К двухсотлетнему юбилею Грозного: урбанонимия и микротопонимия. Статья 2. О местонахождении аулов и хуторов, находившихся на территории современного города" [To the 200th anniversary of Grozny: urbanonymy and microtoponymy. Article 2. On the location of auls and hamlets situated within the territory of the modern city]. Региональное развитие (in Russian) (5 (23)). ISSN 2410-1672.
- Товсултанов, Р. А.; Галимова, Л. Н. (2016). "Бей-Булат Таймиев – выдающийся военно-политический деятель Чечни первой трети XIX века" [Bey-Bulat Taymiev as an outstanding military and political figure of Chechnya in the first third of the 19th century]. Самарский научный вестник [Samara Journal of Science] (in Russian). 5 (4): 109–113. doi:10.17816/snv20164207. ISSN 2309-4370.

===== English =====
- Gelaeva, Zara Alaudinovna; Kindarova, Yaha Abdullaevna; Mukaeva, Taisa Shamzatovna (2024). "The Revolt of 1825 in Chechnya Led by Beibulat Taimiev". In Bataev, Dena Karim-Sultanovich; Gapurov, Shakhrudin Aidievich; Osmaev, Abbaz Dogievich; Akaev, Vakhit Khumaidovich; Idigova, Lalita Musaevna; Ovhadov, Musa Rukmanovich; Salgiriev, Ali Ruslanovich; Betilmerzaeva, Maret Muslamovna (eds.). Social and Cultural Transformations in the Context of Modern Globalism – SCTCMG 2023. International Scientific Conference "Social and Cultural Transformations in the Context of Modern Globalism" (SCTCMG 2023). European Proceedings of Social and Behavioural Sciences. Vol. 134. London: European Publisher. pp. 178–185. doi:10.15405/epsbs.2024.10.22. ISBN 978-1-80296-133-1. ISSN 2357-1330.

==== Websites ====
- Саралиева, Л. Ш. (28 January 2014). "Восстание в Кабарде в 1825 г.: причины, ход, последствия". Современные проблемы науки и образования (in Russian). Издательский дом «Академия Естествознания». ISSN 2070-7428.
