= Groznaya Expedition (1827) =

1827 Military Conflict between Chechnya and the Russian Empire

- Part of Caucasian War and Russo-Persian War (1826–1828)
- Design of the Groznaya Fortress during the Caucasian War.
Date	24 September [O.S. 12 September] 1827
Location	Groznaya Fortress, Sunzha Line and Shchedrinskaya, Russian Empire (Modern-day Grozny and Staro-Shchedrinskaya, Shelkovskoy District, Chechnya) 43°18′43″N 45°41′20″E
Result	Russian Victory

Belligerents
Chechnya	Russian Empire; Cossacks; Braguny Khanate; Chechen Loyalists

Commanders and leaders
(Chechnya) Bey-Bulat Taymiev	Groznaya: (Russian Empire) Terenty Sorochan Shchedrinskaya: Ustarkhan Kudenetov

Strength
700; 400 Infantry; 300 Cavalry	Unknown

Casualties and losses
Groznaya: “Insignificant” Shchedrinskaya: Total: 4; 1 KIA; 2 WIA; 1 POW	Unknown
- Location of the Groznaya Fortress in modern-day Chechnya.

Between late August and early September, the Mekhk-Da of Chechnya, Bey-Bulat Taymiev, launched a series of operations against Russian settlements and fortifications along the Sunzha and Terek Rivers, most notably Groznaya and Shchedrinskaya. These operations were unsuccessful: His first attempt against Groznaya failed, while a second attack on the fortress was repelled, as was the diversionary attack on Shchedrinskaya.

Following the failure of the expedition, Taymiev abandoned further operations against the Sunzha and Terek lines and moved toward Greater Chechnya and the Kumyk Plain. Most of his remaining forces soon deserted him however following several Persian defeats during the Russo-Persian War of 1826–1828.

== Background ==
The 1825 uprising in Chechnya led by Bey-Bulat Taymiev was suppressed following a series of Russian campaigns under Aleksey Yermolov in 1826. By the end of May, organized resistance had largely collapsed, and Taymiev left Chechnya, travelling first to Dagestan and later beyond the Kuban and to Anapa.

The outbreak of the Russo-Persian War (1826–1828) created new opportunities for resistance in the North Caucasus. Persian authorities attempted to encourage uprisings against the Russian Empire and established contacts with several Caucasian leaders, including Taymiev. Together with other opponents of Russian rule, he became involved in efforts to renew unrest in Chechnya and Dagestan. Despite these efforts, no large-scale uprising initially developed in Chechnya, although armed raids along the Caucasian Line continued through 1826 and 1827.

== Prelude ==
During the Russo-Persian War (1826–1828), renewed attempts were made to encourage resistance to Russian rule in Chechnya. A letter sent from Tabriz and signed by several North Caucasian figures, including Bey-Bulat Taymiev, called on the Chechens to take up arms against the Russian Empire.

In late August 1827, Taymiev returned to Chechnya with six supporters and a considerable sum of money. He immediately sent agents throughout the region and called for a general uprising. Men who agreed to follow him as far as the Alazani were promised five silver rubles, while those continuing beyond the river were promised full maintenance. Taymiev also received assistance from fugitive Kabardians sent from beyond the Kuban, who distributed proclamations encouraging the North Caucasian population to rise against Russian rule.

Taymiev's return increased unrest in Chechnya. Supported by Muhammad al-Quduqli, he began attracting followers, while armed groups became increasingly active around Groznaya.

=== August Attempted Raid on Groznaya ===
On 27 August, Bey-Bulat Taymiev made an earlier attempt to attack Groznaya with a force of around 700 men. The force was divided into two groups. About 300 mounted fighters demonstrated in front of the fortress in an attempt to draw the Russian garrison into the open, while approximately 400 infantry remained concealed behind the Sunzha, intending to attack the fortress once its defenders had been drawn away.

Colonel Sorochan led troops out of Groznaya against the mounted detachment, but did not pursue it far because he lacked sufficient forces for a prolonged pursuit. He soon returned to the fortress, preventing Taymiev's concealed force from carrying out the planned attack. The attempt therefore ended without an assault on the fortress itself. The failure did not end Taymiev's plans against Groznaya, and he began preparing a second attempt in September.

== Expedition ==
=== Diversion Attack on Shchedrinskaya ===
On 10 September, Taymiev ordered preparations for an apparent crossing of the Terek and sent part of his force toward the stanitsa of Shchedrinskaya. The movement was intended to divert Russian attention from Groznaya and weaken the vigilance of its garrison before a renewed attack on the fortress.

On 11 September, the detachment was discovered in a forest by Chechen loyalists from Braguny. Under their prince, Ustarkhan Kudenetov, the Chechen loyalists attacked the detachment, dispersing it through the forest. The attackers suffered 1 killed, 2 wounded and 1 captured.

=== Groznaya ===
The diversionary attack on Shchedrinskaya succeeded in drawing the attention of the Russian garrison in that direction. Taking advantage of this, Bey-Bulat Taymiev launched a surprise attack on the fortress on the night of 12 September. By that time, however, the garrison had been reinforced on the orders of Georgi Emmanuel with a reserve of Line Cossacks, some of whom had been hastily summoned from Kabardia. Taymiev's forces were repelled by grapeshot from the fortress artillery and by the Cossacks, forcing them to retreat toward Khankala. The attack on groznaya had failed for a second time.

According to Vasily Potto, the Chechens suffered only minor losses during the attack, as the following day, the Russians only found one dead horse and a blood-stained Chechen pistol that had been pierced by grapeshot.

== Aftermath ==
Following the failures at Shchedrinskaya and Groznaya, Bey-Bulat Taymiev abandoned further operations against the Sunzha and Terek lines. He instead moved toward Greater Chechnya and the Kumyk plain, where he hoped to gather additional support. His force was reinforced by fighters arriving from Dagestan.

These plans were soon weakened by Russian victories in the Russo-Persian War (1826–1828). News of the capture of Sardar-Abad, Erivan and Tabriz caused the Dagestani fighters who had joined Taymiev to disperse. His remaining force was reduced to no more than about 80 men, bringing his attempt to expand the movement following the raids to an end.

At the same time, relations between the Russian authorities and the Chechens were beginning to change. Under Gustav Engelhardt, commander of the Left Flank of the Caucasian Line, Russian policy in Chechnya became more moderate. During 1826–1827, Taymiev gradually shifted his political position and began distancing himself from his alliance with the Dagestani leader Noh Khan. By December 1827, Engelhardt had drawn up a new plan for the administration of the Chechens, while negotiations increasingly began to replace open armed resistance.

== See also ==
- Bey-Bulat Taymiev — Leader of the Chechen forces.
- Groznaya Raid (1825) — Bey-Bulats first attack on Groznaya.

== Sources ==
=== Bibliography ===
- Волконский, Н. А. (1886). "Глава 7" [Chapter 7]. In Чернявский, И. С. (ed.). Война на Восточном Кавказе с 1824 по 1834 г. в связи с мюридизмом [The War in the Eastern Caucasus from 1824 to 1834 in Connection with Muridism]. Кавказский сборник (in Russian). Vol. 10. Тифлис: Типография Окружного штаба Кавказского военного округа. pp. 54–83 – via DrevLit.
- Потто, В. А. (1889). "XVIII. Чечня после Ермолова" [18. Chechnya after Yermolov]. Кавказская война в отдельных очерках, эпизодах, легендах и биографиях [The Caucasian War in Separate Essays, Episodes, Legends and Biographies] (in Russian). Vol. 5: Время Паскевича. Тифлис: Типография Окружного штаба Кавказского военного округа. pp. 123–128.
- Ахмадов, Я. З.; Хасмагомадов, Э. Х. (2005). "Глава II. Чечня в первой трети XIX века. Взаимоотношения с Российской империей" [Chapter 2. Chechnya in the first third of the 19th century. Relations with the Russian Empire]. История Чечни в XIX-XX веках [History of Chechnya in the 19th-20th Centuries]. История Чечни с древнейших времен до конца XVIII века (in Russian). Москва: Пульс. pp. 40–122. ISBN 5-93486-046-1 – via eLIBRARY.RU.
- Товсултанов, Р. А.; Галимова, Л. Н. (2016). "Бей-Булат Таймиев – выдающийся военно-политический деятель Чечни первой трети XIX века" [Bey-Bulat Taymiev as an outstanding military and political figure of Chechnya in the first third of the 19th century]. Самарский научный вестник [Samara Journal of Science] (in Russian). 5 (4): 109–113. doi:10.17816/snv20164207. ISSN 2309-4370.
