= Orstkhoy =

Historical ethnoterritorial society among the Ingush and Chechen people

Orstkhoy Арштхой Орстхой
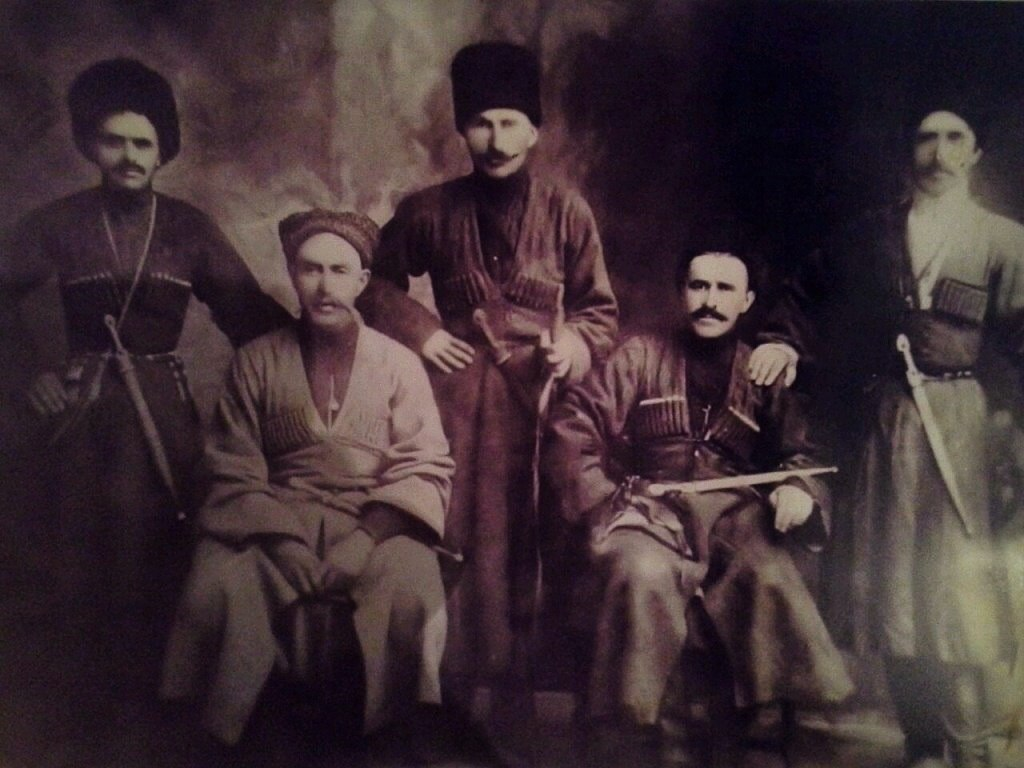
- Orstkhoy abreks from Sagopshi

Total population
- c. 70,000 (2006)

Regions with significant populations
- Russia: ?
- Chechnya: ?
- Ingushetia: ?
- Dagestan: ?

Languages
- Chechen, Ingush

Religion
- Sunni Islam

The Orstkhoy, (Note: Chechen and Ingush: Орстхой. (See the section about other names below.)) historically commonly known under their exonyms: Karabulaks, Balsu, Baloy, Kalkhan, are a historical ethnoterritorial society among the Chechen and Ingush peoples. Their homeland is in the upper reaches of the Assa and Fortanga rivers in the historical region of Orstkhoy-Mokhk (the Sernovodsky District and the border part of the Achkhoy-Martanovsky District of the Chechen Republic, Russia, as well as most of the Sunzhensky District of Ingushetia). In the tradition of the Chechen ethno-hierarchy, it is considered one of the nine historical Chechen tukkhums, in the Ingush tradition as one of the seven historical Ingush shahars.

== Name ==
The name Orstkhoy in their native language (Chechen or Ingush) is "Орстхой", (Note: See [[#CITEREF|]] for the Chechen Dictionary and see Куркиев 2005, p. 330; Бекова et al. 2009, p. 542 (as PDF); Барахоева, Кодзоев & Хайров 2016, p. 56 for the Ingush dictionary) written as "Orstxoj" in the old Latin writing system. (Note: See Macijev 1927, pp. 7–8 for the Chechen dictionary; See Мальсагов 1925, pp. 5–6; Ужахов 1927, p. 6 (2 as PDF) for the Ingush dictionary.) Different theories exist around the origin of the word:

1. The theory of it coming from the word "Are" (Аре), which means plains or steppes, and respectively translating the word as the "inhabitants of the plains". (Note: Горепекин 2006, p. 16; Malsagov 1969, p. 275; Мальсагов 1970, p. 24; Далгат 1971, p. 115)
2. The theory of it coming from the river Arshtynka, proposed by Ya. Z. Ahmadov. According to this theory, the etymology of the river Arshtynka itself goes back to the Proto-Iranian word arashan, which according to Ya. Z. Akhmadov translates as "tasty/clean water".
3. The theory of the word Ershtkhoy (Note: In the work of A. S. Suleymanov, different options for naming the Orstkhoy society are given – "Arstakh", "Arstkhoy", "Arshtkhoy" and "Orstkhoy" (See section Different variants of the word). However, to explain the etymology of the ethnonym, he chose the word form "Erstkhoy".) coming from the three components – härashachu, khithepa and khoi. This theory proposed by A. S. Suleymanov, is explained by him as translating as "Black (from) the river of patrol (guard)". According to the researcher, the evolution of the change in this ethnonym could proceed approximately in the following way: Härzhachu khi thera khoi → Härsh hithera khoi → Harshtkhoy → Ershtkhoy.
4. The theory of it coming from the word ors (орс; other variants: арс, урс, ерс), whose root means "wooded mountain", less commonly "forest". This theory proposed by Ya. S. Vagapov, was almost in the same way explained by another Chechen scientist A. D. Vagapov, however, the morpheme was in the form of arts (Chechen), oarts (Ingush) and ars (dialect). A. D. Vagapov translated the word as "wooded mountain" or "foothills". (Note: In modern dictionaries, the morpheme orts is indicated in the meaning of "the northern slope of the mountain overgrown with forest", sometimes it is noted that the meaning obsolete.) The pre-revolutionary publicist K. M. Tumanov erected ars/artsto the prehistoric period and found in Armenian and Georgian toponyms. (Note: For example, Artsakh (part of Syunik), Arsis (the name is associated with the city of Musasir), Artsevani ("foothill village"), Karars/Kararts ("black/charred Arts"), etc.) In addition to the root, in the ethnonym Orstkhoy, Ya. S. Vagapov singled out suffixes -t- (toponymic), -x- (persons), -o- (nominal), as well as the plural ending -y. The researcher associated this ethnonym, for example, with the Orsoi, raising these names close to the meaning of "forest-mountain people" or "forest people".

There's some other variants of the name such as Arshte, Arshtkhoy, Arstkhoy, Oarshtkhoy, Oarstkhoy, Ärshtkhoy or Ershtkhoy:

Variants of the name
| Name | Romanization | Language | Author | Date | Refs |
|---|---|---|---|---|---|
| Arschte | Arschte | Ingush | Georg Hassel | 1821 | |
| Арште Ариш-Тояй | Arshte Arish-Toyai | Ingush Chechen | S. M. Bronevsky | 1823 | |
| Арштхой | Arshtkhoy | Ingush | F. I. Gorepekin | 2006 (c. 1900s) | |
| Ærštxuoj | Arshtkhuoj | Ingush | A. N. Genko | 1930 | |
| Арштхой; Оарштахой | Arshtkhoy; Oarshtakhoy | Ingush | Z. K. Malsagov | 1963 | |
| Арстах; Орстхой; Арстхой Аьрстхой; Эрштхой; Арштхой | Arstakh; Orstkhoy; Arstkhoy Ärstkhoy; Ershtkhoy; Arshtkhoy | Chechen, Ingush | A. S. Suleymanov | 1978 | |
| Оарштхой; Оарстхой | Oarshtkhoy; Oarstkhoy | Ingush | N. D. Kodzoev | 2021 | |

== General information ==
=== Ethnicity ===
==== Ingush origins ====
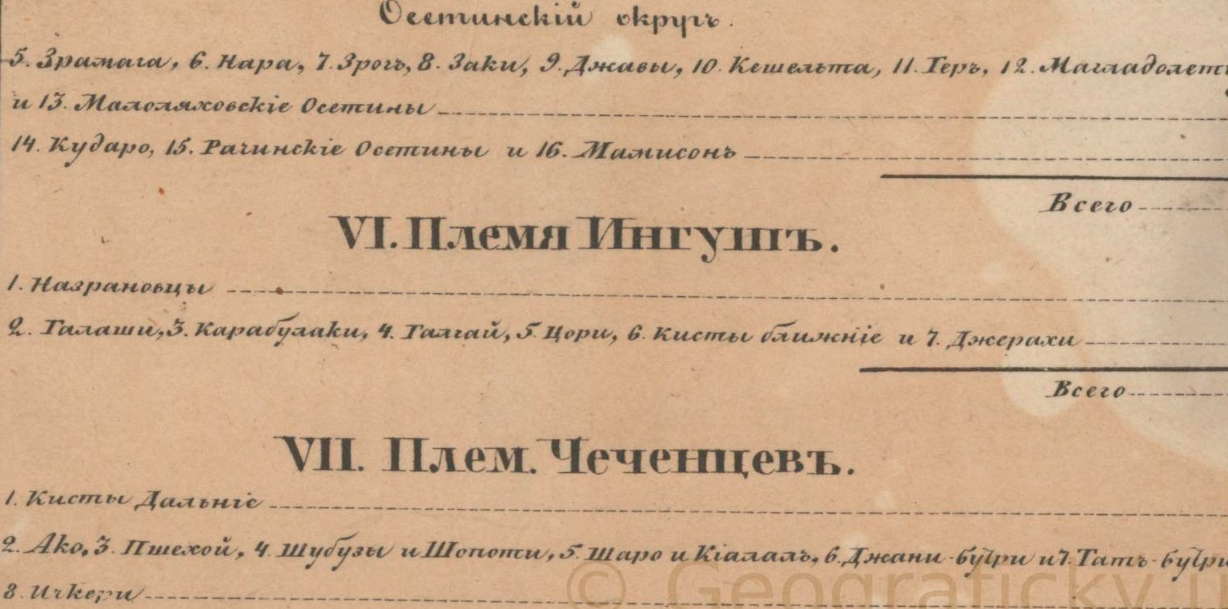
Fragment of the map of the Caucasian region in 1842 showing the societies like the Orstkhoy as a part of the Ingush

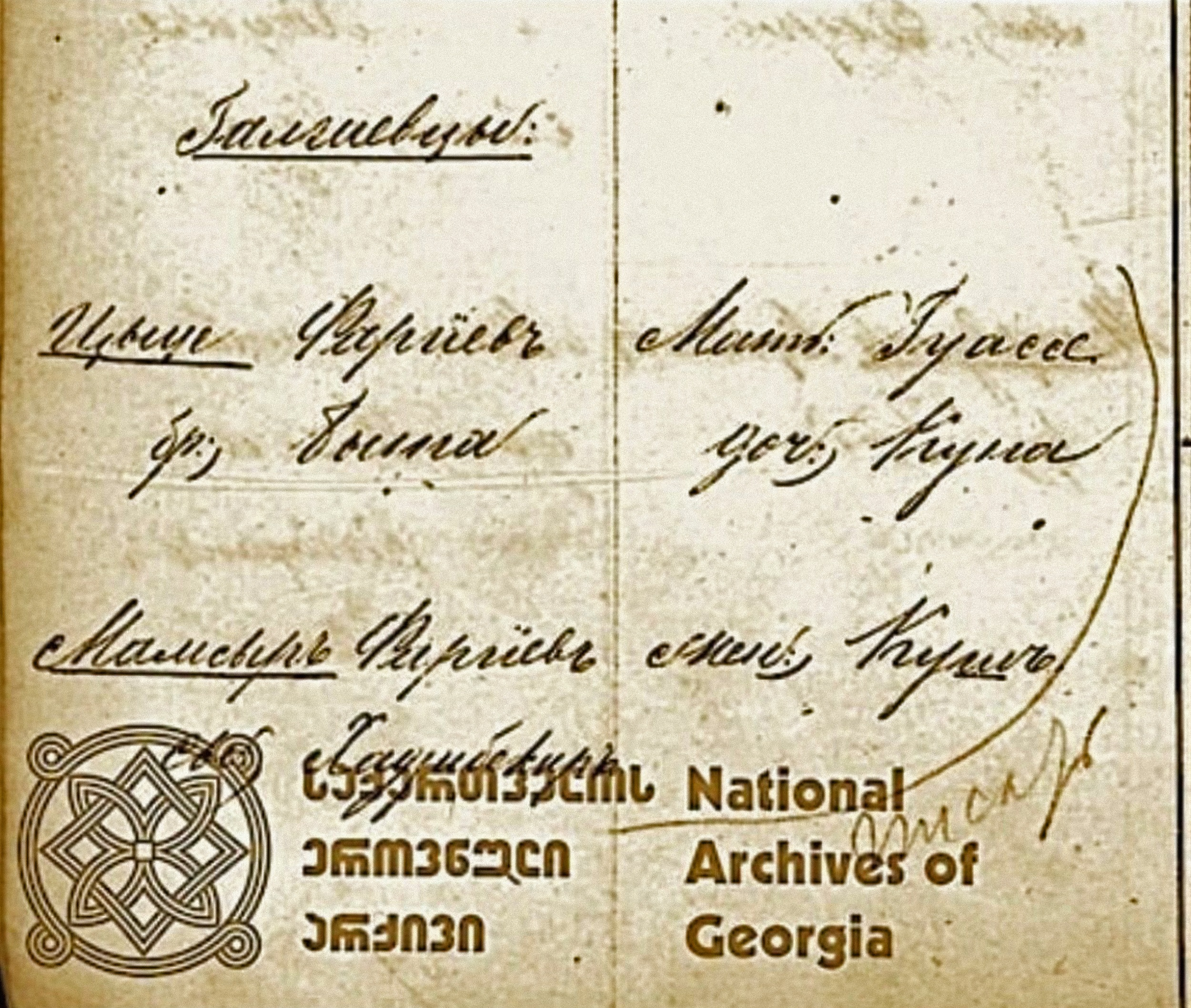
Fargievs (Orstkhoy) in the family lists of the village of Sagopshi in 1862. Signed as Ghalghaï (Галгаевцы).

The first descriptions of the Orstkhoys by European authors in the second half of the 18th century identified them with the Ingush. The first author was J. A. Güldenstädt, who mentions the majority of Orstkhoy villages among other Ingush proper and opposes all of them together to the Chechens. Ten years later, L. L. Shteder, making notes about Karabulaks, gives an almost textbook description of the unique details of typical Ingush vestments, cited by travelers and authors of the late 18th-19th centuries, often replicated on the images of that era. (Note: For example by Peter Simon Pallas, Julius Klaproth and others.) The German scientist Professor Johann Gottlieb Georgi, in his fundamental encyclopedic Description of all the peoples living in the Russian state wrote about Karabulaks stating that, "Before anything they were called Yugush (Ingush), but they call themselves Arshtas", while another German scientist, P. S. Pallas, also states that the Karabulaks specifically come from the Ingush (Ghalghaï).

The German geographer and statistician Georg Hassel, in his geographical description of the Russian Empire and Dshagatai mentioned Orstkhoy as an Ingush tribe and also some of Orstkhoy ancestral villages as Ingush when enlisting the territorial division of the Ingush. Subsequently, S.M. Bronevsky confirmed the identity of the Orstkhoy with the Ingush. Just like Güldenstädt, S. M. Bronevsky also mentioned many Orstkhoy ancestral villages as Ingush in 1823. General Staff I.I. Nordenstamm in his "Brief Military statistical description" compiled from information collected during the expedition in 1832 stated that "the Kara-Bulakh language is similar to the Galash dialect, and the latter is similar to the Galgai and Kist dialects." Platon Zubov and Nikolay Danilevsky stated that the Kists, Ingush and Karabulaks all speak the same language. Nikolay Danilevsky also noted that the Chechen dialect differed from the root language.

In 1842, Nazranians and part of Karabulaks made an appeal to the Russian administration where they called themselves "Ingush people".

In the Russian Empire, on the basis of scientific, statistical and ethnographic data, the Orstkhoy were officially classified as Ingush alongside Galashians, Nazranians and other Ingush societies. (Note: Генко 1930, p. 685 referring to the "Statement of the peoples living between the Black and Caspian Seas in the area subject to Russia with the meaning of the population of these tribes, the degree of their obedience to the government and the form of government", 1833 (RGVIA F. 13 454., Op. 12., D 70), an extract from Statement... was published in the appendix to the Military Statistical Description of the Terek Region by G. N. Kazbek, part I, Tiflis, 1888, p. 4.) In "Overview of the political state of the Caucasus" in 1840 as well as in the "Military Statistical Review of the Russian Empire" in 1851, the Orstkhoy are indicated as Ingush. The Orstkhoy were perceived as Ingush by Imperial Russia, as well as in the Imamate of Imam Shamil. (Note: According to information from the Arabic "Map of Shamil's possessions", stored in the National Archives of Georgia and its Russian translation of the same year with "Explanation to the districts of Dagestan" for the retinue of His Imperial Majesty, entitled "Dagestan's Imam and Warrior Shamil". The map was compiled by a Chechen naib Yusuf Safarov from Aldy on Shamil's orders specifically for sultan Abdul-majid I (1839-1861), and sent to Istanbul with the Ottoman officer Hadji Ismail, who arrived from him to Shamil, but was intercepted on the way back in Georgia. In a special table, twice entitled "Explanation of how many districts in Dagestan are on this map and into how many parts Dagestan is divided", there is a special column "Ingush division (iklim)", under which are named "Mardzhy", "Galgaï", "Inkush", "Kalash", "Karabulaq". Total "5".)

I. Ivanov, in his article "Chechnya" published in the Moskvityanin magazine, wrote that Chechnya borders on the west with the Ingush tribes Tsori, Galgai, Galash and Karabulak. The Czech-German biologist and botanist Friedrich Kolenati in his work about the Caucasians, wrote about the Orstkhoy as an Ingush tribe alongside Galashians, Kists and others. Adolf Berge in his work "Chechnya and Chechens" gave the following nomenclature of the Ingush: Nazranians, Karabulaks, Galashians, Dzherakh, Kists (Note: Including the Distant Kists and Nearby Kists.) Galgai, Tsorins and Akkins. V. A. Volkonsky stated that the Ingush people consist of societies to which he added Orstkhoy and one of the subgroups of Orstkhoy – Merzhoy. A. Rzhevusky in his work "Tertsy" wrote about Karabulaks and Galashians as the restless and militant Ingush societies. According to V. Chudinov, the Karabulaks, Galashians and Alkhons are Ingush who belong to the Arshtkhoy tribe. According to Vasily Potto, Nazranians and Orstkhoy are Ingush societies who once formed one rather a significant and powerful tribe. Russian Count and Minister of War Dmitry Milyutin wrote in his memorials that the Orstkhoy are Ingush who made up part of the Ingush population of the Vladikavkazsky okrug.

Later in the 20th-21st centuries, the Orstkhoy as one of the Ingush societies were indicated by I. Pantyukhov, John F. Baddeley, G. K. Martirosian, E. I. Krupnov, N. A. Sotavov, M. S. Meyer and O. S. Pavlova.

In Soviet times, Orstkhoy were also officially included in the Ingush, as reflected on their passports. (Note: Волкова 1973, p. 170; Шнирельман 2006, pp. 209–210 (referring to Волкова 1973, pp. 162, 170–172).) In Great Soviet Encyclopedia, Orstkhoy are indicated as Ingush. In the scientific community in the second half of the 20th to the early 21st century, the ethnicity of the Orstkhoy is defined as one of the Ingush societies. (Note: For example Крупнов 1971, pp. 119, 152, 174; Павлова 2012, pp. 56, 83.) The Soviet historian and ethnographer E.I Krupnov in 1971 wrote in his book "Medieval Ingushetia" that the remaining Karabulaks (Orstkhoy) who don't consider themselves Chechens live in Ingushetia in villages such as Arshty, Dattykh, Bamut, Sagopshi.

In the censuses conducted before the Deportation, the vast majority of population of the tribal villages Sagopshi, Dattykh, Alkun, Sarali Opiev, Bamut, Gandalbos was Ingush. (Note: • In 1874 the population of Sagopshi consisted entirely of Ingush. In 1890 the population of Sagopshi consisted entirely of Ingush. In 1926 the population of Sagopshi was majority Ingush. • In 1890 the population of Alkun consisted entirely of Ingush. In 1914 the population of Alkun consisted entirely of Ingush. In 1926 the population of Alkun consisted predominantly of Ingush. • In 1890 the population of Sarali Opieva consisted entirely of Ingush. In 1914 the population of Sarali Opieva consisted entirely of Ingush. • In 1890 the population of Dattykh consisted entirely of Ingush. In 1926 the population of Dattykh consisted predominantly of Ingush. • In 1926 the population of Gandalbos consisted entirely of Ingush. • In 1926 the population of Bamut consisted predominantly of Ingush.)

==== Chechen origins ====
===== 18th century =====
The first descriptions of the Orstkhoys by European authors in the second half of the 18th century identified them with the Chechens. The first author was the German cartographer and printmaker Jacob von Staehlin who in his work "Geographical menology for 1772" included the Karabulaks (Orstkhoy), Chechens, Atakhizs and also Tavlins in the territory of "Kumytskaya or Sandy land", also referred by him as the "Chechen land". J. A. Güldenstädt mentions that Karabulaks speak in a Chechen or Midzheg dialect of the Kistin language and that Chechens are often understood as the whole Kistin nation (in this case Nakh Peoples). In 1781, L.L. Städer, while making notes about the Karabulaks, mentions that the Chechens share with them one origin and language. Johann Gottlieb Georgi also mentions that the Karabulak language consists of Kistin and Chechen dialects."

===== 19th century =====
Many Russian and European authors noted during the early and late 19th century that the Orstkhoy tribe was part of the Chechen nation, among them Baron R. F. Rozen who in 1830 believed that the Chechens are divided … into societies under the name of Chechens themselves or Mechigiz, Kachkalyks, Mechikovites, Aukhites and Karabulaks (Orstkhoy) …" Nordenstam also remarked in 1834 that "Karabulaki (Orstkhoy), Aukhites and Kachkalyk people speak dialects of the Chechen language". Also of note is Nikolay Danilevsky who in 1846 noted that the Karabulaks are a subgroup of the Chechen nation. Ivanov connected a part of Karabulaks with the "Peaceful Chechens" and Kolenati referred to the land Karabulaks inhabit on as Chechnya. Russian colonels such as Baron Stahl mentioned the Orstkhoy by the Chechen self name "Nakhche" in 1849. The Russian-German general A.P. Berger in 1859 also connected the Chechen self name "Nakhche" to the Orstkhoy:

“Here is the calculation of all the tribes into which it is customary to divide the Chechens. In the strict sense, however, this division has no basis. It is completely unknown to the Chechens themselves. They call themselves Nakhche, i.e. "people" and this refers to the entire people who speak the Chechen language and its dialects. The mentioned names were given to them either from auls, like Tsori, Galgaï, Shatoi, etc., or from rivers and mountains, like Michikovtsy and Kachkalyks. It is very likely that sooner or later all or most of the names we have given will disappear and the Chechens will retain one common name.

The military historian A. L. Zisserman, who served 25 years in the Caucasus, also mentions the Karabulaks in his book, stating, "All this valley up to the right bank of the Terek River is inhabited…. Karabulaks and Chechens, etc., belonging by language and customs, with insignificant differences and shades, to one Chechen tribe (Nachkhė)." In the Bulletin of the Imperial Russian Geographical Society for 1859, Karabulaki-Orstkhois are noted as Chechens. 19th-century Caucasian military historian V. A. Potto also attributed the Karabulaks to the Chechen people.

Historian N. F. Dubrovin in 1871 in his historical work History of war and dominion of Russians in the Caucasus states the following: in addition to these societies, the Chechen tribe is divided into many generations, which are named by Russians by the names of auls, or mountains, or rivers, in the direction of which their auls were located. For example, Karabulaki (Orstkhoevtsy), on a plain irrigated by the rivers Assa, Sunzha, and Fortanga, etc. Several encyclopedias of the late 19th and early 20th centuries attribute the Karabulaks (Orstkhoys) to the Chechen people.

In 1862, after the Caucasus War, several Orstkhoy villages (Meredzhi, Yalkharoy, Galai and the villages surrounding them) were put into the Ingushskiy Okrug until 1866, when they were ceded to the Argunskiy Okrug due to them belonging to the same nation as the locals (Chechen) and geographically closer to the central governance of the Okrug.

===== 20th century =====
The Soviet historian and ethnographer E.I Krupnov in 1971 noted in his book "Medieval Ingushetia" that at present time, the Karabulaks (Orstkhoy) are classified more as Chechens than Ingush in the scientific circles, without denying their proximity to the Ingush.

Soviet ethnographers like the famous N.G Volkova who interviewed Vainakh people noted that from her interviews in 1973 the Chechen highlanders identify Orstkhoy as "Nokhchi" (self-name of Chechens) but that Chechens living on the Martan river brought them closer to Ingush people. The Ingush however identified Orstkhoy as a separate nation whose language was closer to Chechen. The Orstkhoy themselves according to Volkova identified closer to "Nokhchi" (self-name of Chechens) and saw themselves as one nation with Chechens. The Orstkhoy also said that no one considers them Ingush but that they were written down as Ingush on their passports.

===== National census =====
The inhabitants of over 20 native highland villages of Orstkhoy: Tsecha-Akhke, Meredzhi, Gerite, Muzhgan, Yalkharoy, Galai etc. were all ethnic Chechens according to 5 censuses conducted before the deportation (1874–1926).

== History ==
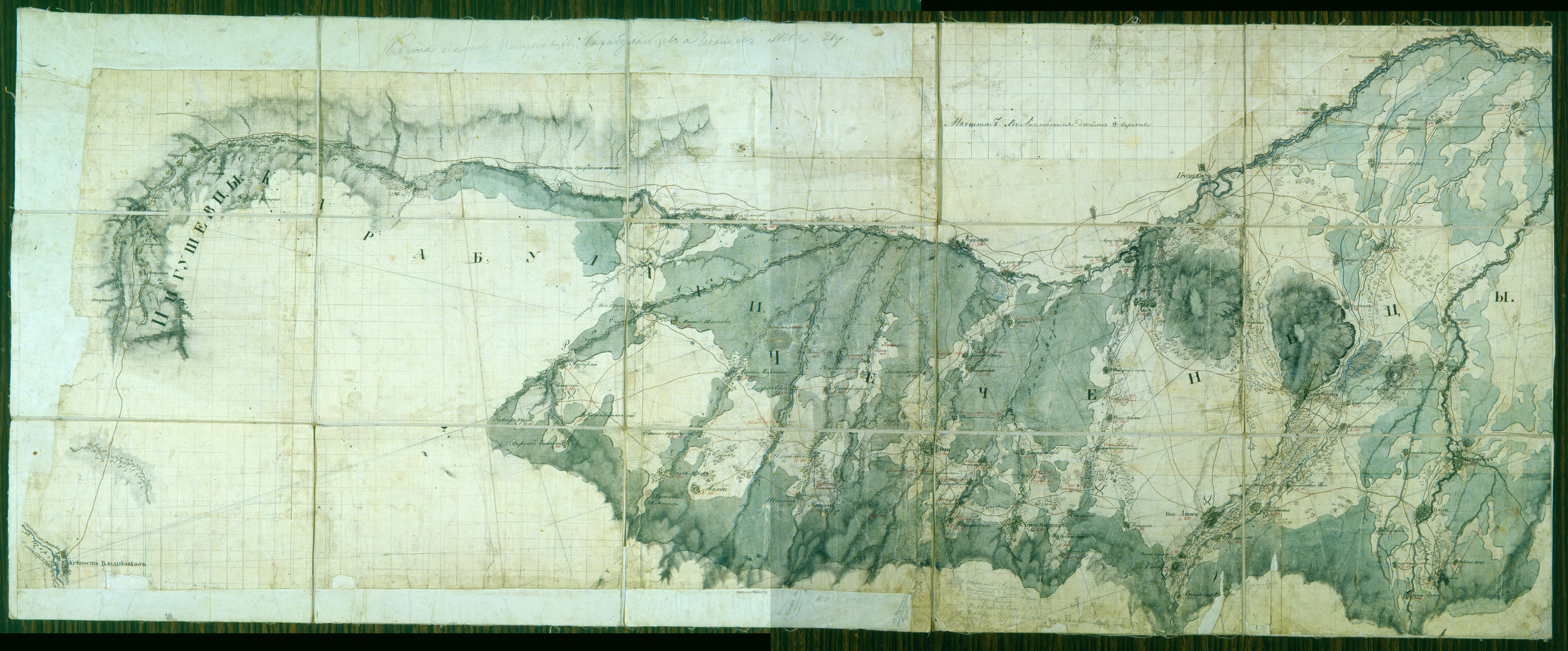
Map showing Ingush (Ингушевцы), Karabulaks (Карабулахи) and Chechens (Чеченцы) in 1825

=== Formation of the society ===
The Orstkhoy formed from settlers that came from the mountain region, with the date of the formation ranging from second half of the 16th to beginning of 18th century. (Note: The Ingush historian N. D. Kodzoev believed that the Orstkhoy society had been developing since the end of the 17th century. Although in his work, there is another statement: the researcher lists the Orstkhoy society among 6 Ingush shahars, whose formation he refers to more early period – by the 2nd half of the 16th – 17th centuries). Chechen historian Ya. Z. Akhmadov attributed the formation of the Orstkhoy society to the first decades of the 18th century.) They are said to be the first ones to master the plains in the region.

=== First mentions ===
The Orstkhoy first become known under the name Karabulaks in the document of the Collegium of Foreign Affairs signed by M. I. Vorontsov and A. M. Golitsyn dated 1763 in connection with the resettlement of a part of the Orstkhoys to the plain in the region of Aukh, modern day Dagestan. Later on, in the 70-90s of the same century, Orstkhoy are mentioned in the works of famous Western European and Russian authors such as J. A. Güldenstädt, L. L. Shteder, P. S. Pallas and others. Although the Orstkhoy were first mentioned in 1762 as Karabulaks, one of the sub-group of Orstkhoy, the Merzhoy clan (teip), is connected by some authors to the toponym Merezi mentioned in the documents of Russian Empire in the 1600s. (Note: The documents are two: 1) 1616, earlier than October 6th: "The petition of the Okochan servicemen of the Terek city, filed in the Terek order hut about harassment by the Kabardian prince Sunchaley Yanglychevich Cherkasskiy"; 2) 1619, later than May 4th: "An reportage from the Terek Governor N. D. Velyaminov to the Embassy order on bringing sherti by the Kabardian Murza Aleguk Sheganukov and on the request of the Kabardian Murzas to send military people to them for a joint fight against the Nogai Tatars".) The ethnonym Mereſchey mentioned in 1705 by Nicolaes Witsen is connected by some authors to Merzhoy as well.

=== Contacts with Russian Empire ===
In the document of the Collegium of Foreign Affairs signed by M. I. Vorontsov and A. M. Golitsyn dated 1763, it is recorded how half of the Orstkhoy took an act of oath to the Endirey Kumyk prince Adji-Murtazali, and under the conditions they would accept Islam, settled in the plain area under Endirey (modern day Aukh region, Dagestan). (Note: See the section #Settlement, where there's information about the descendants of those Orstkhoy settlers.) Accordingly, since the Endirey Ullubii was already vassal of Russia, it was believed that the Orstkhoy were passing under the protection of Russia.

In 1771, Orstkhoy took act of oath to Russian Empire. However it is worth saying that even after the oath of individual Caucasian society or clans, their relations remained the same. In fact, both sides took these types of oaths as a conclusion union treaties.

In 1782, due to a request of Ossetians and Orstkhoy, the Russian Empire built a fortress near Tatartup to protect the Ossetians and Orstkhoy from the raids conducted by Kabardians and mountain Chechens.

In the 1780s, Sheikh Mansur tried to fully convert the semi-pagan Orstkhoy to Islam and bring them to his side against the Russians, he had some successes as the Orstkhoy at times joined his movement and promised to fulfill his demands. In the end Sheikh Mansur failed to fully bring the Orstkhoy to his side and due to that there were often clashes and raids. In mid-June, having gathered 1,000 fighters, Mansur moved to Orstkhoy-Mokhk, with the goal of converting the remaining pagan Orstkhoy. He was forced to leave after the arrival of Russian detachments, however.

=== Caucasian War ===
During the Caucasian War, Orstkhoy bitterly resisted the Russian expansion in the region and were commonly referred as "un-ruly" or "half-conquered" by the Russian Empire, as they never really did bow under the Russian rule and continued on making raids on Russian royal fortifications and settlements.

In 1822, Ingush and Karabulaks together with Chechens participated in two Uprisings of Chechnya, which happened in the same year, against the Russian Empire.

During the beginning of 19th century, there was number of punitive expeditions made against Orstkhoy by the Russian Empire:

- In 1807, by Russian troops led by Major General P. G. Likhachev. Military historian V. A. Potto called this act "the last feat of Likhachev's fifteen years of service in the Caucasus".
- In 1825, by Russian troops to the Orstkhoy settlements along the rivers of Assa and Fortanga.

In 1827, Orstkhoy swore allegiance to Russia (i. e. recognized Russian citizenship) along with some other North Caucasian peoples, (Note: Tagaurians, Karabulaks, Digorians, Balkars, Uruspians, Chegils, Khulams, Bezengi, part of Chechens and Gumbets) thanks to the actions of the commander of the troops on the Caucasian Line, in the Black Sea and Astrakhan (as well as the head of the Caucasus Governorate) – General G. A. Emmanuel. Emmanuel was rewarded the Order of St. Alexander Nevsky for this accession because accordingly, it was "made not by force of arms, but smart orders".

In March 1840, the Galashian and Orstkhoy societies participated in the uprising of Chechnya and with their deputies together with Chechens solemnly swore allegiance to Imam Shamil in the large center village of Lesser Chechnya, Urus-Martan, thus becoming part of the Caucasian Imamate. The Orstkhoy district (naibstvo) of Imamate was known as Vilayet Arshtkhoy and it existed up until 1851, when it was disestablished after being conquered by Russian Empire.

As the letter of Muhammad Amin Asiyalav dating back to October 1848 states, the Naib of Vilayet Arshtkhoy (Arshtinskoe Naibstvo) was selected Muhammad-Mirza Anzorov, a Kabardian naib, who also at the time ruled Minor Chechnya as the district of Imamate:

"From the knowledgeable mudir, adherent of Islam Muhammadamin to his generous brothers and glorious friends, the valiant, zealous, brave inhabitants of Kalai and Arashdi – salam is constant.

And then – obedience to the imam is the duty of every person, and helping Islam is the duty of men.

You should obey the one who is placed over you, and he is our faithful brother Muhammadmirza."

In 1858, Orstkhoy, together with the Nazranians, the Galashians and the inhabitants of the Tarskaya Valley, took part in one of the episodes of the Great Caucasian War, the Nazran uprising, which was suppressed by Russia and its leaders executed or exiled.

=== As part of the Russian Empire ===
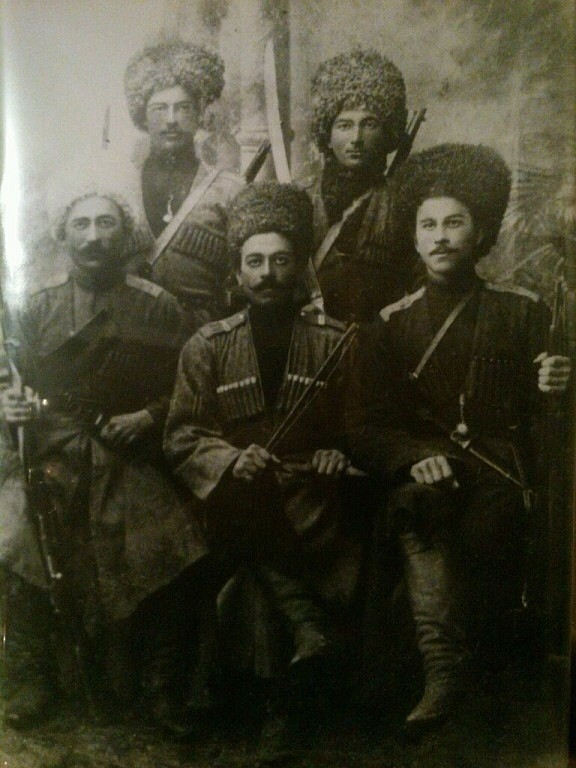
Orstkhoy in the Savage Division (Russian: Дикая Дивизия), a.k.a. the Caucasian Native Cavalry Division, a cavalry division of the Imperial Russian Army (beginning of the 20th century).

After the end of Caucasian War, Orstkhoy were part of the Ingushskiy Okrug as part of the Karabulakskiy Uchastok. In 1865, several thousand Orstkhoys were evicted/resettled in Turkey, in particular 1366 families, (Note: The Ingush historian N. D. Kodzoev indicated the number of settlers as following: "about 3-5 thousand Ingush (mostly Orstkhoy)".) in fact, the majority of them. The Karabulakskiy Uchastok itself was abolished due to the mass eviction of its inhabitants. In the ESBE it was even reported that the Orstkhoy are a tribe that "completely moved to Turkey". John F. Baddeley noted in his work The Russian Conquest of the Caucasus:

"After Shamil's fall, a large numbers of the Ingoushee, and notably the clan known as the Karaboulaks, who have left their names to the Cossack stanitsa, took part in the emigration of the Muhammadan tribes to Turkey, while those who remained have since acquired an evil reputation as the most daring highway robbers and assassins in the Caucasus."

== Notable people ==
- Astemir Karabulaksky, abrek, naib of Caucasian Imamate.
- Jambulat Tsechoev, companion of Bey-Bulat Taymiev, leader of the Insurgency in Ingushetia and Karabulak (1825-1826).
- Derbich Seyt, Naib of Imam Shamil, Qadi (Judge) of Katyr-Yurt from the Merzhoy teip.
- Vetin Zowrbi, Naib of Imam Shamil, commander of 100 men under the command of Naib Saadola Ospanov from the Merzhoy teip.
- Batal Hajji Belkhoroev (1824 – 1911), sheikh, imam, the founder of Batal Hajji wird.
- Dzhokhar Dudaev (1944 – 1996), Soviet Major General, leader of Chechen Republic of Ichkeria.
- Isa Munayev (1965 – 2015), Brigadier General of Chechen Republic of Ichkeria and commander of the Dzhokhar Dudayev Battalion.
- Akhmed Khuchbarov (1894 - 1956), abrek, guerilla fighter and warlord who led an vainakh resistance against the Soviet regime for 27 years up until his death in 1956.
- Maksharip Muzhukhoev (1942 – 2015), archeologist, historian (doctor of historical sciences).
- Tamerlan Gorchkhanov (1932 – 1994), Minister of Health and Social Protection of Ingushetia.
- Tarko Hajji Gardanov (1850 – 1920), imam, political and military figure, participant of Russian Civil War.
- Sulumbek of Sagopshi (1878 – 1911), abrek.

== See also ==
- Ingush people
- Ingush societies
- Galashians
- History of Chechnya
- Chechens
- Nakh Peoples

== Bibliography ==
- Anchabadze, George (2001). Vainakhs (The Chechen and Ingush). Tbilisi: Caucasian House. pp. 1–76.
- Meskhidze, J. I. (March–June 2006). "Shaykh Batal Hajji from Surkhokhi: towards the history of Islam in Ingushetia" (PDF). Central Asian Survey. 25 (1–2). Routledge: 179–181. doi:10.1080/02634930600903262. eISSN 1465-3354. ISSN 0263-4937. OCLC 202671183. S2CID 143571210.
- Павлова, О. С. (2012). Ингушский этнос на современном этапе: черты социально-психологического портрета [The Ingush ethnos at the present stage: features of the socio-psychological portrait] (in Russian). Москва: Форум. pp. 1–384. ISBN 9785911346652. OCLC 798995782.
- Сотавов, Н. А.; Мейер, М. С. (1991). Северный Кавказ в русско-иранских и русско-турецких отношениях в XVIII в. [North Caucasus in Russian-Iranian and Russian-Turkish relations in the 18th century] (in Russian). М.: Наука. pp. 1–221.
- Куркиев, А. С. (2005). Мургустов, М. С.; Ахриева, М. С.; Гагиев, К. А.; Куркиева, С. Х.; Султыгова, З. Н. (eds.). Ингушско-русский словарь: 11142 слова [Ingush-Russian dictionary: 11142 words] (in Russian). Магас: Сердало. pp. 1–545. ISBN 5-94452-054-X.
- Бекова, А. И.; Дударов, У. Б.; Илиева, Ф. М.; Мальсагова, Л. Д.; Тариева, Л. У. (2009). Ингушско-русский словарь [Ingush-Russian Dictionary] (in Ingush and Russian). Нальчик: «Республиканский полиграфкомбинат им. Революции 1905 г.». pp. 1–990. ISBN 978-5-88195-965-4.
- Барахоева, Н. М.; Кодзоев, Н. Д.; Хайров, Б. А. (2016). Ингушско-русский словарь терминов [Ingush-Russian dictionary of terms] (in Ingush and Russian) (2nd ed.). Нальчик: ООО «Тетраграф». pp. 1–288.
- Мальсагов, З. К. (1925). Ингушская грамматика со сборником ингушских слов [Ingush grammar with a collection of Ingush words] (in Russian). Владикавказ: Гостипография „СВЕТ“ И. А. О. pp. 1–224.
- Ужахов, М. Г. (1927). Ингушско-русский словарик [Ingush-Russian dictionary] (in Ingush and Russian). Владикавказ: Крайнациздат. pp. 1–185.
- Горепекин, Ф. И. (2006). "Краткие сведения о народе «ингуши»" [Brief information about the people "Ingush"]. In Албогачиева, М.С-Г.; Мартазанов, А. А. (eds.). Труды Фомы Ивановича Горепекина [Works of Foma Ivanovich Gorepekin] (in Russian). СПб.: Ладога. pp. 1–204. ISBN 5-98635-011-1.
- Malsagov, A. O. (1969). "О нарт-орстхойском эпосе ингушей и чеченцев" [About the Nart-Orstkhoy epic of the Ingush and Chechens]. In Petrosyan, A. A.; Alieva, A. I.; Gatsak, V. M.; Dalgat, U. B. (eds.). Сказания о нартах — эпос народов Кавказа [Tales of the Narts - the epic of the peoples of the Caucasus] (in Russian). Moskva: Nauka. pp. 255–281.
- Мальсагов, А. О. (1970). Нарт-орстхойский эпос вайнахов [Nart-Orstkhoy epic of the Vainakhs] (in Russian). Грозный: Чечено-Ингушское книжное издательство. pp. 1–178.
- Macijev, A. G. (1927). Noxčin-Örsin dešniꞑ žajna [Chechen-Russian dictionary] (in Russian). Rostov-Don: Krajnacizdat. pp. 1–183.
- Далгат, У. Б. (1971). Дахкильгов, И. А. (ed.). Героический эпос чеченцев и ингушей: Исследование и тексты [The Heroic Epos of the Chechens and Ingush: Research and Texts] (in Russian). Москва: Наука. pp. 1–469.
- Вагапов, Я. С. (2008). "Вайнахи и сарматы. Нахский пласт в сарматской ономастике" [Vainakhs and Sarmatians. Nakh layer in Sarmatian onomastics]. In Саралиев, Ш. Ю.; Мусаев, З. М.-С.; Хатуев, И. З.; Нунуев, С.-Х. М.; Кадиев, Р. А.; Алироев, И. Ю.; Акаев, В. Х.; Берсанов, Х.-А. А. (eds.). Чеченский архив (Сборник материалов по истории чеченского народа) [Chechen archive (Collection of materials on the history of the Chechen people)] (in Russian) (1st ed.). Грозный: ГУП «Кн. изд-во». pp. 48–113. ISBN 978-5-98896-076-8.
- Вагапов, А. Д. (2011). Овхадов, А. Д. (ed.). Этимологический словарь чеченского языка [Etymological dictionary of the Chechen language] (in Russian). Тбилиси: Меридиани. pp. 1–734. ISBN 978-9941-10-439-8.
- Туманов, К. М. (1913). О доисторическомъ языкѣ Закавказья (Изъ матеріаловъ по исторіи и языкознанію Кавказа) [About the prehistoric language of Transcaucasia (From materials on the history and linguistics of the Caucasus)] (in Russian). Тифлисъ: Типографія Канцеляріи Намѣстника Е. И. В. на Кавказѣ. pp. 1–117.
- Hassel, Georg (1821). Vollständige und neueste Erdbeschreibung des Russischen Reichs in Asia, nebst Dshagatai, mit einer Einleitung zur Statistik des Russischen Asiens, nebst des Dshagatischen Reichs [Complete and most recent geography of the Russian Empire in Asia, along with Dshagatai, with an introduction to the statistics of Russian Asia, along with the Dshagatic Empire] (in German). Vol. 12: Vollständiges Handbuch der neuesten Erdbeschreibung. Weimar: Verlag des geographischen Instituts. pp. 1–896.
- Броневскій, С. М. (1823). "Кисты (глава третья)" [Kists (chapter three)]. Новѣйшія географическія и историческія извѣстія о Кавказѣ (часть вторая) [The latest geographical and historical news about the Caucasus (part two)] (PDF) (in Russian). Москва: Типографія С. Селивановскаго. pp. 151–186.
- Генко, А. Н. (1930). "Из культурного прошлого ингушей" [From the cultural past of the Ingush]. Записки коллегии востоковедов при Азиатском музее [Notes of the College of Orientalists at the Asian Museum] (in Russian). Vol. 5. Ленинград: Издательство Академии наук СССР. pp. 681–761.
- Мальсагов, З. К. (1963). Оздоева, Ф. (ed.). Грамматика ингушского языка [Grammar of the Ingush language] (in Ingush and Russian). Vol. 5 (2nd ed.). Грозный: Чечено-Ингушское Книжное Издательство. pp. 1–164.
- Сулейманов, А. С. (1978). Шайхиев, А. Х. (ed.). Часть II: Горная Ингушетия (юго-запад) и Чечня (центр и юго-восток) [Part 2: Mountainous Ingushetia (southwest) and Chechnya (center and southeast)]. Топонимия Чечено-Ингушетии: в IV частях (1976-1985 гг.) (in Russian). Грозный: Чечено-Ингушское Книжное Издательство. pp. 1–233.
- Кодзоев, Н. Д. (2021). Хайрова, Р. Р. (ed.). Русско-ингушский словарь [Russian-Ingush dictionary] (in Ingush and Russian). Ростов-на-Дону: Типография «Лаки Пак». pp. 1–656. ISBN 978-5-906785-55-8.
- Гюльденштедт, Иоганн Антон (2002). "VI. Провинция Кистия, или Кистетия" [VI. Province of Kistia, or Kistetia]. In Карпов, Ю. Ю. (ed.). Путешествие по Кавказу в 1770-1773 гг. [Journey through the Caucasus in 1770-1773] (field research) (in Russian). Translated by Шафроновской, Т. К. Санкт-Петербург: Петербургское Востоковедение. pp. 238–243. ISBN 5-85803-213-3.
- Штедер, Л. Л. (2010). "Дневник Путешествия в 1781 году от пограничной крепости Моздок во внутренние области Кавказа" [Diary of a Journey in 1781 from the border fortress of Mozdok to the interior regions of the Caucasus]. Кавказ: европейские дневники XIII—XVIII веков [Caucasus: European Diaries of the 13th-18th Centuries] (in Russian). Translated by Аталиков, В. Нальчик: Издательство В. и М. Котляровых. pp. 202–221.
- Георги, И. Г. (1799). Описание всех обитающих в Российском государстве народов. Их житейских обрядов, обыкновений, одежд, жилищ, упражнений, забав, вероисповеданий и других достопамятностей [Description of all peoples living in the Russian state. Their everyday rituals, habits, clothes, dwellings, exercises, amusements, religions and other monuments] (in Russian). Vol. 2: о народах татарского племени. Санкт-Петербург: Императорская Академия Наук. pp. 1–246.
- Паллас, П. С. (1996). "Путешествие по южным провинциям российской империи в 1793 и 1794 годах" [Journey through the southern provinces of the Russian Empire in 1793 and 1794]. In Аталиков, В. М. (ed.). Наша старина [Our antiquity] (in Russian). Нальчик.
- Зубов, П. П. (1835). Картина Кавказскаго края, принадлежащаго Россіи и сопредѣльныхъ оному земель въ историческомъ, статистическомъ, этнографическомъ, финансовомъ и торговомъ отношеніяхъ [A picture of the Caucasus region belonging to Russia and adjacent lands in historical, statistical, ethnographic, financial and trade relations] (in Russian). Vol. 3. С. Петербургъ: Типографія Конрада Вингебера. pp. 1–272.
- Дѣло канцеляріи Кавказскаго комитета по просьбѣ Назрановского и части Карабулакского общества объ оставленіи за ними занимаемыхъ ими земель и о другихъ нуждахъ. Здѣсь же Высочайшее разрѣшеніе объ освобожденіи всѣхъ покорныхъ кавказскихъ горныхъ племенъ отъ платежа податей и повинностей и по предмету обращенія ихъ въ православіе [The case of the office of the Caucasian Committee, at the request of Nazranovsky and part of the Karabulak society, about leaving behind them the lands they occupied and about other needs. Here is also the Highest resolution on the release of all obedient Caucasian mountain tribes from the payment of taxes and duties and on the subject of their conversion to Orthodoxy] (in Russian). 1842. pp. 1–72.
- Данилевскій, Николай (1846). Кавказъ и его горскіе жители въ нынѣшнем ихъ положеніи [The Caucasus and its mountain inhabitants in their current position] (in Russian). Москва: Университетская типографія. pp. 1–197.
- "Обзор политического состояния Кавказа 1840 года" [Overview of the political state of the Caucasus in 1840]. www.vostlit.info (in Russian). 1840.
- "Кавказскій край" [Caucasian territory]. Военно-статистическое обозрѣніе Россійской имперіи: издаваемое по высочайшему повеленію при 1-м отделеніи Департамента Генеральнаго штаба [Military Statistical Review of the Russian Empire: published by the highest command at the 1st branch of the Department of the General Staff] (in Russian). Vol. 16: Part 1. St Petersburg: Типографія Департамента Генеральнаго штаба. 1851. pp. 1–274.
- Иванов, Иванъ (2 September 1851). Ржевскій, Д. (ed.). "Чечня" [Chechnya]. Москвитянинъ (in Russian). No. 19–20. Москва: Типографія Н. Степанова. pp. 172–200.
- Общенациональная Комиссия по рассмотрению вопросов, связанных с определением территории и границ Ингушетии (2021). Всемирный конгресс ингушского народа (ed.). Доклад о границах и территории Ингушетии (общие положения) [Report on the borders and territory of Ingushetia (general provisions)] (archival documents, maps, illustrations) (in Russian). Назрань. pp. 1–175.
- Чудинов, В. (1889). "Окончательное покореніе осетинъ" [The final conquest of the Ossetians]. In Чернявскій, И. С. (ed.). Кавказскій сборникъ [Caucasian Collection] (in Russian). Vol. 13. Тифлисъ: Типографія Окружнаго штаба Кавказскаго военнаго округа. pp. 1–122.
- Kolenati, Friedrich (1858). Die Bereisung Hocharmeniens und Elisabethopols, der Schekinschen Provinzund des Kasbek im Central-Kaukasus [Traveling through High Armenia and Elizabethopol, the Shekin Province and Kazbek in the Central Caucasus] (in German). Dresden: Yerlagsbuchhandlung von Rudolf Kuntze. pp. 1–289.
- Мартиросиан, Г. К. (1928). Нагорная Ингушия [Upland Ingushiya] (in Russian). Владикавказ: Государственная типография Автономной Области Ингушии. pp. 1–153.
- Крупнов, Е. И. (1939). "К истории Ингушии" [To the history of Ingushiya]. Вестник древней истории (in Russian). 2 (7). Москва: 77–90.
- Робакидзе, А. И., ed. (1968). Кавказский этнографический сборник. Очерки этнографии Горной Ингушетии [Caucasian ethnographic collection. Essays on the ethnography of Mountainous Ingushetia] (in Russian). Vol. 2. Тбилиси: Мецниереба. pp. 1–333.
- Крупнов, Е. И. (1971). Средневековая Ингушетия [Medieval Ingushetia] (in Russian). Москва: Наука. pp. 1–211.
- Волконскій, Н. А. (1886). "Война на Восточномъ Кавказѣ съ 1824 по 1834 годы въ связи съ мюридизмомъ" [War in the Eastern Caucasus from 1824 to 1834 in connection with Muridism]. In Чернявскій, И. С. (ed.). Кавказскій сборникъ [Caucasian collection] (in Russian). Vol. 10. Тифлисъ: Типографія Окружнаго штаба Кавказскаго военнаго округа. pp. 1–224.
- Ржевускій, А. (1888). Терцы. Сборникъ исторических, бытовыхъ и географическо-статистическихъ свѣдѣній о Терскомъ казачьем войскѣ [Tertsy. Collection of historical, everyday, geographical-statistical information about the Terek Cossacks army] (in Russian). Владикавказъ: Типографія Областнаго Правленiя Терской Области. pp. 1–292.
- Милютин, Д. А. (1919). Христіани, Г. Г. (ed.). Воспоминанія. Книга 1, 2, 3 [Memorials. Book 1, 2, 3] (in Russian). Vol. 1. Томскъ: Изданіе военной Академіи. pp. 1–458. ISBN 5998998936.
- Baddeley, John F. (1908). The Russian Conquest of the Caucasus: with maps, plans, and illustrations. Harlow: Longsmans, Greens and Co. pp. 1–518.
- Baddeley, John F. (1940). The Rugged Flanks of Caucasus. Vol. 1. London: Oxford University Press: Humphrey Milford. pp. 1–318.
- Волкова, Н. Г. (1973). Этнонимы и племенные названия Северного Кавказа [Ethnonyms and tribal names of the North Caucasus] (in Russian). Москва: Наука. pp. 1–210.
- Шнирельман, В. А. (2006). Калинин, И. (ed.). Быть Аланами: Интеллектуалы и политика на Северном Кавказе в XX веке [To be Alans: Intellectuals and Politics in the North Caucasus in the 20th Century] (in Russian). Москва: Новое Литературное Обозрение. pp. 1–348. ISBN 5-86793-406-3. ISSN 1813-6583.
- Потто, В. А., ed. (1904). Утвержденіе русскаго владычества на Кавказѣ. Vol. 3: Part 1. Тифлис: Типографія штаба Кавказскаго военного округа. pp. 1–527.
- Шмидт, О. Ю., ed. (1937). Большая советская энциклопедия [Great Soviet Encyclopedia] (in Russian). Vol. 28: Империалистическая война - Интерполяция (1st ed.). Москва: Советская энциклопедия. pp. 1–501.
- Зейдлиц, Н. (1878). Терская область. Список населённых мест по сведениям 1874 года [Terek region. List of populated places according to 1874]. Списки населенных мест Кавказского края (in Russian) (1st ed.). Тифлис: Типография Главного управлении наместника Кавказского. pp. 1–81.
- Терскій Областной Статистическій Комитет (1885). Благовѣщенскій, Н. А. (ed.). Списокъ населенныхъ мѣстъ Терской области: По свѣдѣніям къ 1-му января 1883 года [List of populated areas of the Terek region: According to information on January 1st of 1883] (in Russian). Владикавказъ: Типографія Терскаго Областнаго Правленія. pp. 1–78.
- Терскій Областной Статистическій Комитет (1890). Максимов, Е. (ed.). Сунженскій отдѣл [Sunzhensky Otdel]. Статистическиія таблицы населенныхъ мѣстъ Терской области (in Russian). Vol. 1. Issue 1. Владикавказъ: Типографія Терскаго Областнаго Правленія. pp. 1–85.
- Терскій Областной Статистическій Комитет (1915). Гортинскій, С. П. (ed.). Списокъ населенныхъ мѣстъ Терской области: (По даннымъ къ 1-му іюля 1914 года) [List of populated places in the Terek region: (as of July 1, 1914)] (in Russian). Владикавказъ: Электропечатня Типографія Терскаго Областнаго Правленія. pp. 2, 15–459.
- Северо-Кавказское кравое статистическое управление (1929). Поселенные итоги переписи 1926 года по Северо-Кавказскому краю [Settled results of the 1926 census in the North Caucasus region] (in Russian). Ростов-на-Дону: Отдел переписи. pp. 1–547 (as PDF).
- Штелин, Я. Я. (1771). Географическій мѣсяцословъ на 1772 годъ [Geographical menology for 1772] (in Russian). Санктпетербургъ: Императорская Академія наукъ. pp. 1–96.
- Dubrovin N. F. Chechens (Nakhche) // Book 1 "Caucasus". History of the war and domination of Russians in the Caucasus. - St. Petersburg: in the printing house of the Department of Goods, 1871. - T. I. - 640 p.
- Nadezhdin P.P. Caucasian mountains and highlanders // Nature and people in the Caucasus and beyond the Caucasus. - St. Petersburg: Printing house of V. Demakov, 1869. - p. 109. - 413 p.
- Berzhe A.P. The eviction of the highlanders from the Caucasus // Russian antiquity. - St. Petersburg, 1882. - T. 36. - No. 10−12.
- Yu. M. Elmurzaev. Pages of the history of the Chechen people. - Grozny: Book, 1993. - S. 7 - 8. - 112 p. — ISBN 5-09-002630-0.
- Encyclopedia of military and marine sciences / edited by G.A. Leer. - St. Petersburg: Type. V. Bezobrazov and Comp., 1889. - T. IV. — 659 s
- Encyclopedic Dictionary, Man - Chuguevsky regiment. - St. Petersburg: F. A. Brockhaus (Leipzig), I. A. Efron (St. Petersburg), 1903. - T. XXXVIII.
- Berger A. P. Chechnya and Chechens. - Tiflis: printed from the Highest H.I.V. permission in the printing house of the Main Directorate of the Viceroy of the Caucasus, 1859. - S. I-VII, 1–140. — 140 p. : from ill. and maps.
- Encyclopedic Dictionary / edited by: prof. Yu. S. Gambarov, prof. V. Ya Zheleznov, prof. M. M. Kovalevsky, prof. S. A. Muromtsev, prof. K. A. Timirzyaev. - Moscow: Russian Bibliographic Institute Granat, 1930. - T. 48.
- Tsalikov A. T. The Caucasus and the Volga region. - Moscow: M. Mukhtarov, 1913. - p. 35. - 184 p. - History, Ethnology of individual territories.
- Rittikh A. F. IX // Tribal composition of the contingents of the Russian army and the male population of European Russia. - St. Petersburg: Type. Cartographic institution A. A. Ilyin, 1875. - p. 331. - 352 p.
- Tkachev G. A. Ingush and Chechens in the family of nationalities of the Terek region. - Vladikavkaz: Terek region. board, 1911. - p. 150. - 152 p.
- Кодзоев, Н. Д. (2002a). История ингушского народа. Глава 5. Ингушетия В XIX В. § 1. Ингушетия в первой половине XIX в. Основание Назрани [History of the Ingush people. Chapter 5. Ingushetia in the XIX Century § 1. Ingushetia in the first half of the XIX century. Foundation of Nazran] (in Russian). Archived from the original on 2019-07-23.
- Кодзоев, Н. Д. (2002b). "Ингушетия в XV-XVIII вв." [Ingushetia in the 15th-18th centuries]. История ингушского народа [History of the Ingush people] (chapter) (in Russian). Archived from the original on 2012-05-11.
- Ахмадов, Я. З. (2009). Очерк исторической географии и этнополитического развития Чечни в XVI-XVIII веках [Essay on the historical geography and ethnopolitical development of Chechnya in the 16th-18th centuries] (in Russian). Грозный: Благотворительный фонд поддержки чеченской литературы. pp. 1–422. ISBN 978-5-91821-013-0.
- Берже, А. П., ed. (1875). Акты, собранные Кавказской археографической комиссіею [Acts collected by the Caucasian Archaeographic Commission] (in Russian). Vol. 6: Part 2. Тифлисъ: Типографія Главнаго Управленія Намѣстника Кавказскаго. pp. 1–950.
- Кушева, Е. Н. (1963). Народы Северного Кавказа и их связи с Россией (вторая половина XVI — 30-е годы XVII века) [The peoples of the North Caucasus and their relations with Russia (the second half of the 16th - 30s of the 17th century)] (in Russian). Москва: Издательство Академии наук СССР. pp. 1–368.
- Демидова, Н. Ф.; Кушева, Е. Н.; Персов, А. М. (1957). Кумыков, Т. Х.; Кушева, Е. Н. (eds.). Кабардино-русские отношения в XVI-XVIII вв.: Документы и материалы [Kabardino-Russian relations in the XVI-XVIII centuries: Documents and materials] (in Russian). Vol. 1. Москва: Издательство Академии наук СССР. pp. 1–476.
- Кушева, Е. Н. (1997a). "Челобитная служилых „окочан" Терского города, поданная в Терской приказной избе, о притеснениях со стороны кабардинского кн. Сунчалея Янглычевича Черкасского" [The petition of the „Okochan” servicemen of the Terek city, filed in the Terek order hut about harassment by the Kabardian prince Sunchaley Yanglychevich Cherkasskiy]. In Волкова, Н. Г. (ed.). Русско-Чеченские отношения: Сборник документов [Russian-Chechen relations: Collection of documents] (in Russian). Москва: Восточная Литература. ISBN 5-02-017955-8.
- Кушева, Е. Н. (1997b). "Отписка терского воеводы Н. Д. Вельяминова в Посольский приказ о принесении шерти кабардинским мурзой Алегукой Шегануковым и о просьбе кабардинских мурз прислать к ним ратных людей для совместной борьбы с ногайскими татарами" [An reportage from the Terek Governor N. D. Velyaminov to the Embassy order on bringing sherti by the Kabardian Murza Aleguk Sheganukov and on the request of the Kabardian Murzas to send military people to them for a joint fight against the Nogai Tatars]. In Волкова, Н. Г. (ed.). Русско-Чеченские отношения: Сборник документов [Russian-Chechen relations: Collection of documents] (in Russian). Москва: Восточная Литература. ISBN 5-02-017955-8.
- Witsen, N.A C. (1705). Noord en Oost Tartarye, ofte bondig ontwerp van eenige dier landen en volken, welke voormaels bekent zijn geweest [North and East Tartarye, or too succinct outline of some of those lands and peoples formerly known] (in Dutch). Vol. 2. Amsterdam: François Halma. pp. 1–467.
- Долгиева, М. Б.; Картоев, М. М.; Кодзоев, Н. Д.; Матиев, Т. Х. (2013). Кодзоев, Н. Д. (ed.). История Ингушетии [History of Ingushetia] (4th ed.). Ростов-на-Дону: Южный издательский дом. pp. 1–600. ISBN 978-5-98864-056-1.
- Кодзоев, Н. Д. (2020a). О 'добровольном вхождении' Ингушетии в состав Российской империи [On the 'voluntary entry' of Ingushetia into the Russian Empire] (in Russian). Назрань: ООО «Кеп». pp. 1–64.
- Бутков, П. Г. (1869). Броссе, Л. (ed.). Матеріалы для новой исторіи Кавказа, съ 1722 по 1803 годъ: Хронологическій и алфавитный указатели [Materials for the new history of the Caucasus, from 1722 to 1803: Chronological and alphabetical indexes] (in Russian). Vol. 3. Санктпетербургъ: Типографія Императорской Академіи Наукъ. pp. 1–621.
- Гаджиев, В. Г.; Рамазанов, Х. Х. (1959). Даниялов, Г.-А. Д. (ed.). Движение горцев Северо-Восточного Кавказа в 20—50 гг. XIX века [The movement of the highlanders of the North-Eastern Caucasus in the 20–50s of 19th century] (in Russian). Makhachkala: Дагестанское книжное издательство. pp. 1–787.
- Зиссерман, А. Л. (1889). Бартенев, П. И. (ed.). "Фельдмаршалъ князь А. И. Барятинскій: Глава IV" [Field Marshal knyaz A. I. Baryatinsky: Chapter 4]. Русскій архивъ (in Russian). No. 2. Moscow: Университетская типографія. pp. 274–358 (292–376 (PDF).
- Потто, В. А. (1886). Кавказская война в отдельных очерках, эпизодах, легендах и биографиях [Caucasian war in separate essays, episodes, legends and biographies] (in Russian). Vol. 1: От древнейших времен до Ермолова. С.-Петербургъ: Типографія Е. Евдокимова.
- Ястребцев, Е. (1912). "Эммануэль, Георгий Арсеньевич" [Emmanuel, Georgy Arsenievich]. In Половцов, A. A. (ed.). Русскій биографическій словарь (in Russian). Vol. 24: Щаповъ — Юшневскій. С.-Петербургъ: Типографія Главнаго Управленія Удѣловъ. pp. 230–233 – via Wikisource.
- Дагестанский филиал АН СССР (1989). Народно-освободительное движение горцев Дагестана и Чечни в 20-50-х годах XIX в: Всесоюзная научная конференция, 20-22 июня 1989 г.: тезисы докладов и сообщений [The people's liberation movement of the highlanders of Dagestan and Chechnya in the 20-50s of the XIX century: All-Union Scientific Conference, June 20–22, 1989: abstracts of reports and messages]. Makhachkala: Дагестанский филиал АН СССР. pp. 1–190.
- Хожаев, Д. А. (1998). Мазаева, Тамара (ed.). Чеченцы в Русско-Кавказской войне [Chechens in the Russian-Caucasian War] (in Russian). Грозный-Санкт-Петербург: Седа. pp. 1–250. ISBN 5-85973-012-8. Archived from the original on 2014-12-22.
- Мухаммад-Амин (c. 1848). "Письмо Мухаммадамина к жителям Калая и Арашди" [Muhammadamin's letter to the inhabitants of Kalay and Arashdy]. www.vostlit.info (in Russian).
- Базоркин, М. М. (2002). "Дорога заговора и крови" [Road of conspiracy and blood]. In Куркиев, А. Б.; Дзарахова, З. М.-Т.; Тамазова, Л. О.; Демьяненко, Т. В. (eds.). История происхождения ингушей [The history of the origin of the Ingush] (PDF) (in Russian). Нальчик: «Эль-Фа». pp. 113–179.
- Штернберг, Л. Я. (1903). "Чеченцы" [The Chechens]. In Арсеньева, К. К.; Петрушевскій, О. О.; Венгеров, А. И.; Воейков, А. И.; Карѣева, Н. И.; Менделѣева, Д. И.; Радлов, Э. Л.; Соловьев, Н. О.; Сомов, А. И.; Шевяков, В. Т.; Янжула, И. И. (eds.). Энциклопедическій словарь Брокгауза и Ефрона (in Russian). Vol. 38: Человѣкъ — Чугуевскій полкъ. С.-Петербургъ: Семеновская Типолитографія (И.А. Ефрона). pp. 785–786 – via Wikisource.
- Албогачиева, М.С.-Г.; Мартазанов, А. М.; Соловьева, Л. Т., eds. (2013). Ингуши [The Ingush] (in Russian). Москва: Наука. pp. 1–512.
- Албогачиева, М. С.-Г. (2015). "Демаркация границ Ингушетии" [Demarcation of the borders of Ingushetia] (PDF). In Карпов, Ю. Ю. (ed.). Горы и границы: Этнография посттрадиционных обществ [Mountains and Borders: An Ethnography of Post-Traditional Societies] (in Russian). СПб.: МАЭ РАН. pp. 168–255. ISBN 978-5-88431-290-6.
