= Astemir =

Astemir is a masculine given name. It gave rise to the patronymic surname Astemirov. Notable people with the name include:

- Astemir (outlaw) (fl. 1822–1825), Orstkhoy outlaw (abrek) and governor (naib) in Caucasian Imamate
- Astemir Abazov (born 1996), Russian football player
- Astemir Apanasov (born 1989), Circassian singer, musician, and composer
- Astemir Borsov (born 1993), Russian kickboxer
- Astemir Gordyushenko (born 1997), Russian football player
- Astemir Sheriyev (born 1990), Russian football player
- Astemir Soblirov (born 1990), Russian football player
