= Foothills =

Hills before a mountain range

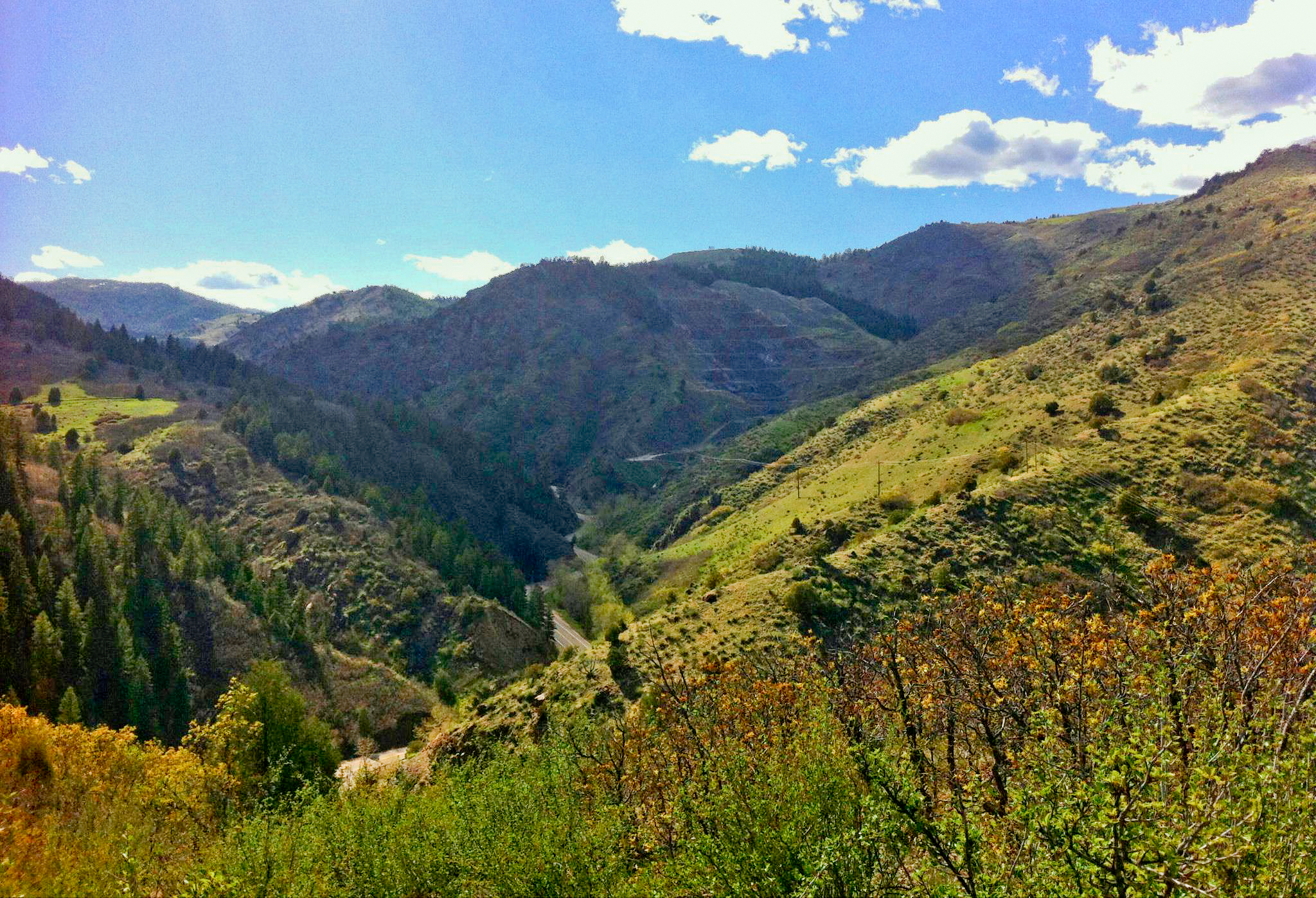
Rocky Mountain foothills near Denver, Colorado

Foothills or piedmont are geographically defined as gradual increases in elevation at the base of a mountain range, higher hill range or an upland area. They are a transition zone between plains and low relief hills and the adjacent topographically higher mountains, hills, and uplands. Frequently foothills consist of alluvial fans, coalesced alluvial fans, and dissected plateaus.

== Description ==
Foothills primarily border mountains, especially those which are reached through low ridges that increase in size closer and closer to the mountain, but can also border uplands and higher hills.

== Examples ==
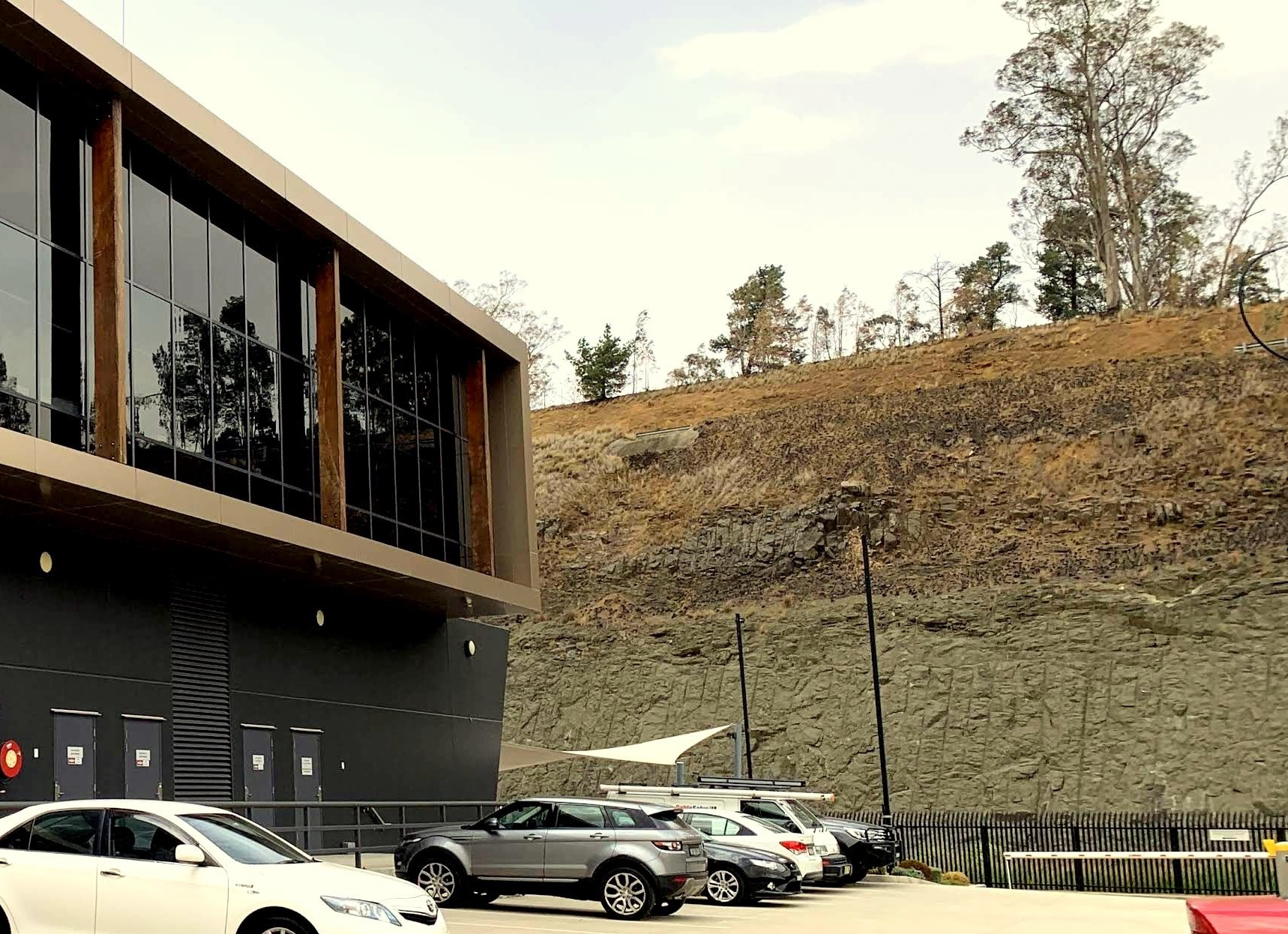
Foothills of Prospect Hill, New South Wales, Australia

Areas where foothills exist, or areas commonly referred to as the foothills, include the:

- Appalachian foothills in Western North Carolina and Northwestern South Carolina, USA
- Sierra Nevada foothills of California, USA
- Foothills of the San Gabriel Valley in Los Angeles County, California, USA
- Rocky Mountain Foothills in British Columbia, Colorado, and Alberta, Canada
- Silesian Foothills in Silesia, Poland
- Black Mountains in the North Caucasus, Russia
- Sivalik Hills along the Himalayas in the Indian subcontinent
- Catalina Foothills near Tucson, Arizona, USA
- Margalla hills near the Himalayas in Pakistan
- The Duars, Chos and Terai on the foothills of Himalayas (India)
- The foothills around Boise in Idaho, USA
- The foothills of the Dandenong Ranges in Melbourne, Australia. Generally the area from Ferntree Gully/Boronia/The Basin through to Belgrave
- The foothills of the Blue Mountains in Sydney, Australia
- The foothills of the Southern Alps in Mid-Canterbury, New Zealand
- The Judean Foothills between the Judean Mountains and Mediterranean Coastline in Israel
- The Satsop Hills of the Olympic Mountains in Washington State
- The Ammon, Idaho Foothills in Bonneville county, Idaho

== Synonyms ==
Another word for a foothill region is "piedmont", derived from "foot of the mount" in Romance languages. The Piedmont region of Italy lies in the foothills of the Alps, and several other foothills in other parts of the world are called "piedmont", and include:

- The piedmont of the United States which consists of the eastern foothills of the Appalachian Mountains.

Ecosystems of piedmonts (foothills) are often known as submontane zones, relating to the higher montane ecosystems.
