= Astemirov =

Astemirov (feminine: Astemirova) is a patronymic surname derived from the given name Astemir. Notable people with the surname include:

- Adil Astemirov (born 1961), Dagestani artist
- Anzor Astemirov (1976–2010), Islamist leader in the republic of Kabardino-Balkaria, in the North Caucasus
- Eter Astemirova (born 1943), Georgian engineer and politician
