= Battle of Khankala (1994) =

Conflict during the First Chechen War

- Part of the First Chechen War
Date	28 December 1994
Location	Khankala, Chechnya
Result	Russian victory
Territorial changes	Capture of Khankala by the Russian government

Belligerents
Russia	(Chechen Republic of Ichkeria) Chechnya

Commanders and leaders
Unknown	(Chechen Republic of Ichkeria) Umalt Dashaev †

Casualties and losses
Unknown	6 tanks destroyed 1 armoured vehicle destroyed

The Battle of Khankala was a failed attempt by the Chechen separatists to attack the Russian military base at Khankala using heavy weapons on 28 December 1994.

Khankala is a former Soviet military base and airstrip at the eastern outskirts of Grozny, also overtaking the main Rostov-Baku highway and cutting direct access into the Chechen capital of Grozny from the town of Argun. It was captured by a column of Russian troops led by elements of the 104th Guards Airborne Division in a surprise south-east dash from the village of Tolstoy-Yurt.

Reportedly, in the aftermath of the battle, the Chechen attackers were repelled by Russian paratroopers, losing six tanks and an armoured personnel carrier.
