= Chechen raid on Nazran (1810) =

Nazran War
- Part of Chechen–Ingush conflicts
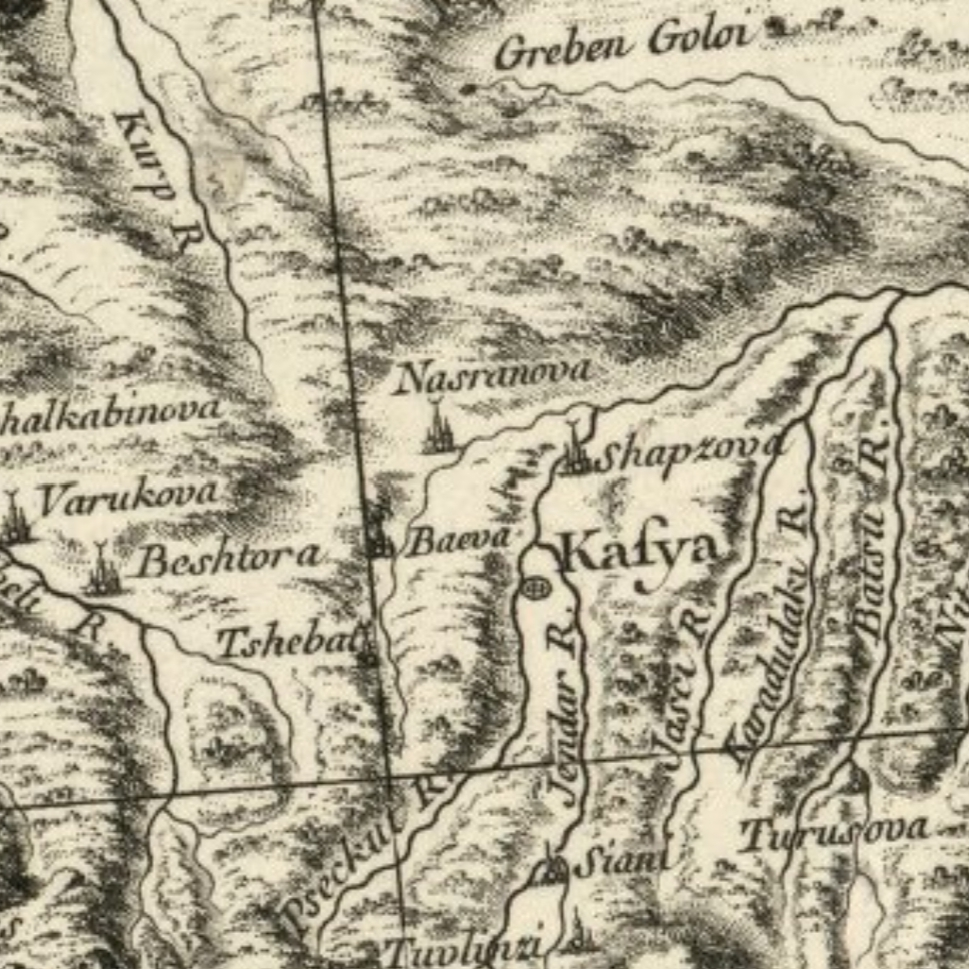
- Nazran ("Nasranova") on the map "Carte de la partie septentrionale de l'empire otoman" made in 1774.
Date	June 5, 1810
Location	Nazran region, North Caucasus, Ingushetia
Result	Ingush victory
Territorial changes	The Ingush settle in Nazran and submit to the Russian Tsar.: The raids on Nazran were temporarily halted.

Belligerents
Chechen societies Kabardia	(Ingushetia) Ingush societies

Commanders and leaders
Beibulat Taimiev; Albast Qanchoqo †; Yelzheruqo Abay †	(Ingushetia) Kartskhal Malsagov

Strength
About 600	(Ingushetia) >100

Casualties and losses
Unknown	Unknown

The Chechen raid on Nazran was an armed conflict between Ingush societies and Chechen groups supported by Kabardian nobles. The clash arose from territorial disputes and a struggle for influence in the Nazran region, which had been uninhabited ever since the Kabardians left it around 1730.

== History ==
=== Prelude ===
Attacks by Kabardians, Chechens, Nogais, and Kumyks were frequent in these areas, plundering the settlers, taking livestock and produce. For defence, Kartskhal Malsagov built a tall, two-storey wooden tower on four pillars, which could accommodate more than a hundred people. A guard was always stationed in the tower. The settlement was surrounded by a trench, with only one gate and a secret entrance to the trench. Secret trenches were dug 50 steps away from the trench and along the banks of the Nazranka and Sunzha rivers.

=== Battle ===
Two Kabardian nobles, Albast and Yelzheruqo, were unwilling to release the Ingush settlers from tribute and organized an attack on the village of Kartskhal Malsagov to seize livestock and agricultural produce. the conflict ended with the Ingush, led by Kartskhal, calling upon more than 100 armed horsemen from nearby mountain villages, achieving a victory over the princely forces and thereby defending their authority to the land. The Chechens, having learned that Kartskhal had taken possession of a place which they considered to be in dispute between them and the Kabardians, went to war against the Ingush. After losing the battle, the Chechens began to retreat. The Ingush set out in pursuit of them with drawn sabres in their hands, as a result of which the Chechens were driven back by the Ingush as far as the Nitty-khoy-khi River.

The Chechen–Kabardian raids on Nazran were described in the Acts collected by the Caucasian Archaeological Commission as follows:

On 5 June 1810, a Chechen detachment of about 600 men, supported by Kabardians, set out to raid Vladikavkaz. On their way back from the raid, the Chechens killed an Ingush shepherd and attempted to seize his sheep. A dispute arose between the Ingush and the Chechen party, as the Ingush were angered by the Chechens’ actions. Gathering a detachment, the Ingush caught up with the Chechens and engaged them in battle. The fighting ended with an Ingush victory; the Kabardian princes Abay Yelzheruqo and Albast Qanchoqo were killed in the battle.
