= John F. Baddeley =

John Frederick Baddeley
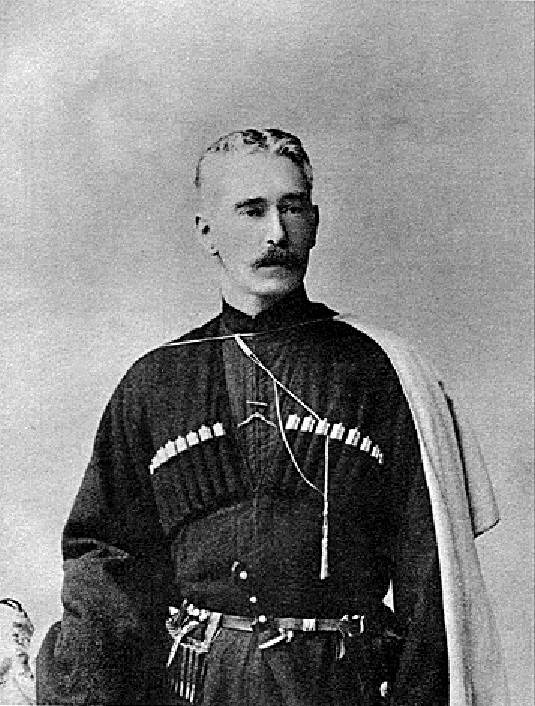
- Born: 1854; Oxford, Oxfordshire, England
- Died: 16 February 1940 (aged 85–86); Oxford
- Occupation(s): Journalist, geographer, historian
- Years active: 1879 – early 1935s
- Awards: Victoria Medal (geography)

John Frederick Baddeley (July 1854 – 16 February 1940) was a British traveller, writer and journalist, best known by his works on Russia and the Caucasus region. He was a Fellow of the Royal Geographical Society, 1902–1940.

He was educated at Wellington College, Berkshire. After visiting Russia for seven months in 1879, Baddeley became the Saint Petersburg correspondent for the London Standard, and began a lifelong relationship with that country, travelling widely and writing several important books on its history. In the summer of 1900 he made his first of several journeys to Siberia and the Russian Far East.

His most outstanding work was Russia, Mongolia, China, a monumental work, published in 1919 in two volumes as a limited edition of only 250 copies, with an elaborate frontispiece ("the book epitomised in a series of pictures", said Baddeley) drawn by Amédée Forestier and engraved by Emery Walker. It bore a dedication "To my friend of many years The Right Honourable Sir William Mather", stating that the production of the book was "due to his generosity alone". It earned Baddeley the Victoria Medal of the Royal Geographical Society, and has been later republished as facsimile.

Other Baddeley's works are The Russian Conquest of the Caucasus (1908), Russia in the 'Eighties', Sport and Politics (1921) and The Rugged Flanks of Caucasus (1940); this posthumously published work is dedicated to the geography, topography, history, archaeology, natural history, and ethnology of the Caucasus, including the oil fields of Baku and some pages on Nadir Shah.

== Bibliography ==
- Baddeley, John F. The Russian conquest of the Caucasus 1720—1860. London, New York, Bombay, Calcutta: Longmans, Green and Co., 1908. Reprinted Mansfield Centre, Conn.: Martino Pub., 2006. ISBN 1-57898-576-5.
- Baddeley, John F. Russia, Mongolia, China .... London: Macmillan and Company, 1919. Reprinted Mansfield Centre, Conn.: Martino Pub., 2006. ISBN 1-57898-641-9.
- Baddeley, John F. Russia in the 'eighties', sport and politics London: Longmans, Green and Co. 1921 OCLC 1663238.

== See also ==
- Caucasian War
