= Astemir Soblirov =

Russian footballer

Personal information
- Full name: Astemir Khazretaliyevich Soblirov
- Date of birth: 27 October 1990 (age 36)
- Place of birth: Germenchik, Kabardino-Balkaria, Russian SFSR
- Height: 1.82 m (6 ft 0 in)
- Position: Defender

Youth career
- 2006–2010: Spartak Nalchik

Senior career*
Years	Team	Apps	(Gls)
2011–2012	Torpedo Armavir	17	(0)
2012	Belshina Bobruisk	0	(0)
2013	Kavkaztransgaz-2005 Ryzdvyany	8	(0)
2014–2015	Angusht Nazran	30	(0)
2015–2017	Spartak Nalchik	44	(4)
2017	Luch-Energiya Vladivostok	19	(0)
2018	Armavir	14	(0)
2018	Urozhay Krasnodar	11	(0)
2021	FC Yevpatoria	7	(0)
2021	Zenit-Izhevsk	14	(0)
- * Club domestic league appearances and goals

Astemir Khazretaliyevich Soblirov (Russian: Астемир Хазреталиевич Соблиров; born 27 October 1990) is a Russian former football defender.

== Club career ==
He made his debut in the Russian Second Division for FC Torpedo Armavir on 21 August 2011 in a game against FC Energiya Volzhsky.

He made his Russian Football National League debut for PFC Spartak Nalchik on 11 July 2016 in a game against FC Kuban Krasnodar.

== Personal life ==
His brother Zhantemir Soblirov is also a footballer.
