= Kumyk =

Kumyk may refer to:

- Kumyks
- Kumyk language
