= Battle of Soldatskaya =

Circassian raid on Russia land in 1825

Raid on Soldatskaya Stanitsa
- Part of Russo-Circassian War, Caucasian War, Insurgency in the North Caucasus (1825-1826), Insurgency in Kabardia (1825)
Date	1825
Location	Soldatskaya Stanitsa
Result	Circassian victory
Territorial changes	Destruction of the stanitsa; capture of civilians

Belligerents
Kabardia (East Circassia)	(Russia) Russian Empire

Commanders and leaders
Jambolet Kushuk; Qantemir Baseqo; Aslanbech Batoqo	Unknown

Strength
~1,000 horsemen	Unknown

Casualties and losses
Unknown	Heavy; the stanitsa destroyed, many civilians killed or taken

Battle of Soldatskaya or Raid on Soldatskaya was a episode during the Russo-Circassian War, highlighting the fierce resistance of the Circassian people against Russian expansion in the North Caucasus.

== History ==
In the early 1825s, a Kabardian force of around 1,000 horsemen, led by Prince Zhambolat, Kantemir Basaev, and Roslambek Batokov, launched a raid on the Russian Cossack settlement of Soldatskaya Stanitsa. The attack resulted in the destruction of the stanitsa and the capture of civilians.
