= Black Mountains (Caucasus) =

Mountain range in the North Caucasus

The Black Mountains, also known as Arzhi-Arts, Black Forest, or Front Range (Chechen: ржи-Арц, lаржа-Арц, Russian: Чёрные горы) is a historical name for mountains in the Caucasus, an oronym encompassing the front mountain ranges of the northern slope of the system of the Greater Caucasus (mountain range — Caucasus Mountains, region — North Caucasus). They consist of discontinuous mountain massifs (short ridges), plateaus, chains of hills, and isolated peaks, stretching parallel to the north of the Main Caucasian Range, from the mouth of the Kuban River to the Sulak River (approximate direction: west-northwest to east-southeast).

In scientific and journalistic literature, there is no clear consensus on the extent of the oronym. In the orographic classification during the Russian Empire, the Black Mountains referred to three front ranges of the Greater Caucasus: the Rocky Ridge, Pasture Ridge, and Wooded Ridge. During the Soviet period, the term Black Mountains was limited to only two orographic units —the Pasture and Wooded Ridges— with the boundaries of the Black Mountains shortened, particularly in the west and east. Some Soviet and modern researchers, as well as local populations, use the name Black Mountains exclusively for the Wooded Ridge, especially in the segment located in Chechnya.

Today, the historical name Black Mountains encompasses a series of ridges (sometimes varying among different researchers), extending across the territories of Russia: Krasnodar Krai, Adygea, Karachay-Cherkessia, Stavropol Krai, Kabardino-Balkaria, North Ossetia, Ingushetia, Chechnya, and Dagestan. Due to differing interpretations of the Black Mountains' boundaries, various sources may report different morphometric characteristics.

1848 Map of Little Chechnya and Part of Vladikavkaz District, scale 3 versts per inch (1:126,000), F. 386, Op. 1, D. 2863 (3)

== Name ==
The first mention of the range appears on the 1848 Map of Little Chechnya and Part of Vladikavkaz District, compiled by the headquarters of the Separate Caucasian Corps with the inscription Arzhi-Arts or Black Mountains.

The peaks of the Black Mountains do not reach the snow line or high-altitude alpine meadows, being limited to the tree line. Likely, the name originated from the dense broadleaf forests that have covered the Black Mountains since ancient times, (Note: By the beginning of the 20th century, the forest on the northern slopes of the Black Mountain ridges had already been significantly cut down.) from the dark color of the dense forested ridges that give the mountains a dark hue. In the Geographical-Statistical Dictionary of the Russian Empire (1863–1885), the etymology of the Black Mountains range is described as follows: "…and it received its name because it is covered throughout its extent with dense, hard-to-access forest". A description of the Black Mountains in Chechnya and the same version of the origin of their name (second half of the 19th century):

To the right of the deep and steep bed of the Shalazhi River and to the left of the Valerik, a high, dense forest began, forming an impenetrable barrier to the movement of troops into the interior of the country. This forest was interrupted by river gorges into separate areas, sloping toward the Chechen Plain, then merging again into one continuous, endless thicket, climbing from ledge to ledge to the very ridge and stretching along the entire crest of the mountains with black-blue bristles, from which they received the name Black Mountains (Karatau).

In the Geographical-Statistical Dictionary of the Russian Empire, both words in the oronym were capitalized — Black Mountains, and the dictionary also listed another name for the Black Mountains — Black Forest. In the Brockhaus and Efron Encyclopedic Dictionary (1890–1907), the name was presented differently — the first word capitalized, the second lowercase — Black mountains. In the article Terek Region by Russian geographer N. Ya. Dinnik in the Encyclopedic Dictionary of Brockhaus and Efron, the Black Mountains were mentioned alongside the name Front Range. Occasionally, synonymous names for the oronym Black Mountains may be found, such as Chernogorye and Karatau (Turkic qara — "black", tay — "mountain").

The name Black Mountains in some languages of the peoples living within their bounds: among the Ingush Argash ('ar.ʁaʃ — of low mountains"), among the Chechens Arts (arts — "forested mountain").

== During the Russian Empire period ==
The understanding of the boundary of the Black Mountains during the period of the Russian Empire was the broadest— the name encompassed the modern independent orographic units of the Rocky, Pasture, and Forested Ridges (during the empire, these oronyms were not used), and likely all the mountains north of the Main Caucasian Range, stretching from the mouth of the Kuban River to the Sulak River. According to the Geographical-Statistical Dictionary of the Russian Empire, the Black Mountains are described as "a secondary ridge, forming as it were a foothill or ledge of the Main Caucasian Range", situated 30–80 versts from it, with the highest points of the Black Mountains located in Kabarda.

In the Encyclopedic Dictionary of Brockhaus and Efron, there was an article on the Black Mountains, which noted that their relief is most prominent in the Batalpashinsky District of the Kuban Oblast (modern parts of the territories of Krasnodar Krai, Karachay-Cherkessia, and Stavropol Krai) and the Terek Oblast (modern parts of the territories of Stavropol Krai, Kabardino-Balkaria, North Ossetia, Ingushetia, Chechnya, and Dagestan), with the highest peaks attributed by the article's author to the basin of the Ardon. In the same encyclopedia, in the article Caucasian Range by Russian geographer V. M. Masalsky, the relief of the Black Mountains was described in greater detail: it was noted that they run north of the Main Range at a distance of 17–60 versts, with their highest points listed along with their elevations—Kion-khok 11,230 feet, Kargu-khok 11,164 feet (the author added the basin of the Urukh to the basins of the highest peaks). In the article Terek Oblast by N. Ya. Dinnik in the Encyclopedic Dictionary of Brockhaus and Efron, in addition to Kion-khok and Kariu-khok (Kargu-khok in V. M. Masalsky), notable peaks such as Mat-khok 9,855 feet, Sardari-khok, and Bermatut were also included.

== Soviet Period ==
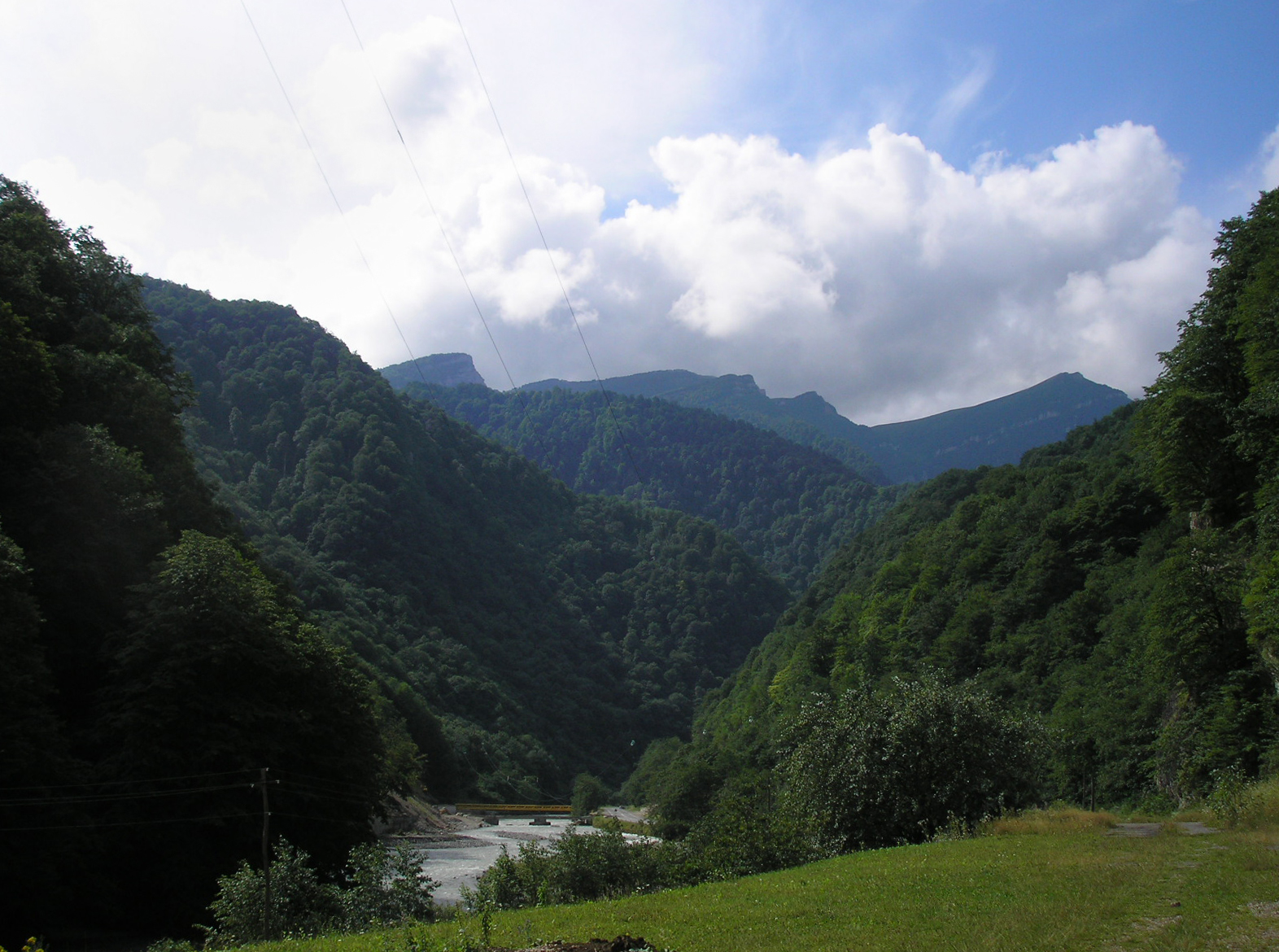
Black Mountains in the Alagir Canyon

During the Soviet period, the northern advance ridges of the Greater Caucasus system were divided into three oronymic units—Rocky, Pasture, and Forested Ridges. For some reason, the term "Black Mountains" came to refer only to the Pasture and Forested Ridges, excluding the Rocky Ridge. The first edition of the Great Soviet Encyclopedia (1926–1947) states that the Black Mountains "consist of two ranges: the Southern (Pasture Ridge)… and the Northern—Forested Ridge…" The highest points of the ridges were listed as Mount Fethus (1,744 m) for the Pasture Ridge and Mount Lysoi (up to 1,035 m) for the Forested Ridge. Additionally, in the article "Black Mountains" in the first edition of the Great Soviet Encyclopedia, the concept of Black Mountains in the Chechen AO was separately highlighted for unclear reasons, without explaining how they differ from the other Black Mountains in the North Caucasus.

In the second edition of the Great Soviet Encyclopedia (1950–1958), the name Black Mountains continued to encompass the Pasture and Forested Ridges, with the clarification that only part of the Pasture Ridge was included in the Black Mountains. The western and eastern boundaries of the oronym were now specified: from the meridian of the city of Maykop to the valley of the Argun. Elevation data was provided, ranging from 500–1,500 m, with the highest point, for unclear reasons, listed as the Djinal Ridge (1,542 m). The same boundaries for the Black Mountains were provided in the Concise Geographical Encyclopedia (1960–1966). In the third edition of the Great Soviet Encyclopedia (1969–1978), the Black Mountains were also defined as the ridges north of the Rocky Ridge, but the boundaries were slightly reformulated: the western boundary was now the Belaya River (with the eastern boundary remaining the Argun River). The elevations were listed up to 1,500 m.

Attempting to clarify the confusion arising from the division of oronyms, the Geographical Encyclopedic Dictionary (1989) added to the traditional formulation the note that "in areas with predominant meadows, the Black Mountains are called the Pasture Ridge". Several authors referred to the Black Mountains as solely the Forested Ridge, particularly characteristic of sections in Ingushetia and Chechnya (e.g., the authors of the work Chechen-Ingush ASSR 1971, V. V. Agibalova 1988). (Note: In addition to the reference to the Black Mountains as another name of the Lesisty Ridge in the work of V. V. Agibalova there is also a statement according to which it is not clear whether the author refers to the Black Mountains only as the Lesisty Ridge or combines the Lesisty Ridge together under this oronym.) In practice, during the Soviet period, the Black Mountains were considered part of the foothill zone of the North Caucasus.

== Nowadays ==
In contemporary scientific and journalistic literature, following the publications of the Soviet period, researchers include the Pasture and Forested Ridges within the Black Mountains (e.g., the authors of the work Ridges of the Greater Caucasus and Their Influence on Climate, 2001). Occasionally, as in some Soviet works, the term "Black Mountains" may refer solely to the Forested Ridge, particularly characteristic of the section of the Black Mountains in the Chechen Republic (e.g., Z. M. Bagalova, G. Z. Anchabadze). However, an increasing number of reference works are ceasing to mention this ancient oronym altogether.

== Bibliography ==
=== Books ===
- Agibalova, V. V. (1988). T. F. Malchevskaya (ed.). На Ассу через Армхи (Туристские маршруты Солнечной долины) [To Assu via Armkhi (Tourist Routes of the Sunny Valley)] (in Russian). Grozny: Chechen-Ingush Book Publishing House. p. 80. ISBN 5-7666-0011-9.
- Anchabadze, G. Z. (2001). Вайнахи [Vainakhs] (Monograph) (in Russian). Tbilisi: N. V. Gelashvili. p. 84.
- Akhmadov, Sh. B. (2002). Чечня и Ингушетия в XVIII — начале XIX века. (Очерки социально-экономического развития и общественно-политического устройства Чечни и Ингушетии в XVIII — начале XIX века). Монография [Chechnya and Ingushetia in the 18th – Early 19th Century: Essays on Socio-Economic Development and Socio-Political Structure of Chechnya and Ingushetia in the 18th – Early 19th Century] (in Russian). Elista: APP “Dzhangar”. p. 528.
- Bokova, V. F.; Vinogradov, V. B.; Zoev, S. O.; Ponomaryev, I. Z.; Rashkevich, N. A.; Pyzhikov, V. V.; Sagaydachny, Yu. M.; Smirnova, M. N.; Scherbakov, N. G. (1980a). "Physical and Economic-Geographical Overview". Физико- и экономико-географический очерк // По Чечено-Ингушетии (путеводитель) [Through Chechen-Ingushetia (Guidebook)] (in Russian) (2nd ed.). Grozny: Chechen-Ingush Book Publishing House. p. 176.
- Bokova, V. F.; Vinogradov, V. B.; Zoev, S. O.; Ponomaryev, I. Z.; Rashkevich, N. A.; Pyzhikov, V. V.; Sagaydachny, Yu. M.; Smirnova, M. N.; Scherbakov, N. G. (1980b). "Brief Physical and Economic-Geographical Overview". Краткий физико- и экономико-географический очерк // По Чечено-Ингушетии (путеводитель) [Through Chechen-Ingushetia (Guidebook)] (in Russian) (2nd ed.). Grozny: Chechen-Ingush Book Publishing House. p. 268.
- Rzhevusky, A. (1888). "Sleptsov's Activities in 1850–1851". Терцы. Сборник исторических, бытовых и географическо-статистических сведений о Терском казачьем войске [Tertsy: A Collection of Historical, Cultural, and Geographical-Statistical Information on the Terek Cossack Army] (in Russian). Vladikavkaz: Printing House of the Terek Region Administration. pp. 72–144.
- Efremov, Yu. V.; Iliechev, Yu. G.; Panos, V. D.; Panova, S. V.; Pogorelov, A. V.; Sheremetyev, V. M. (2001). "Morphometric and Morphological Characteristics of the Main Ranges". In Yu. V. Efremov (ed.). Морфометрическая и морфологическая характеристика основных хребтов // Хребты Большого Кавказа и их влияние на климат [The Ranges of the Greater Caucasus and Their Influence on Climate] (in Russian). Krasnodar: Prosveshchenie-Yug. p. 145. ISBN 5-93491-006-X.
- Chernyavsky, I. S. (1888). Летучий отряд в 1850 и 1851 годах. Кавказский сборник [Flying Detachment in 1850 and 1851. Caucasian Collection] (in Russian). Vol. XII. Tiflis: Printed at Ya. I. Liberman’s Printing House. pp. 345–479.
- Ryzhikov, V. V.; Grebenschikov, P. A.; Zoyev, S. O. (1971). Физико-географические условия // Чечено-Ингушская АССР [Physical-Geographical Conditions. Chechen-Ingush ASSR] (in Russian). Grozny: Chechen-Ingush Book Publishing House. pp. 8–116.

=== Dictionaries and Encyclopedias ===
- Nadelyaev, V. M.; Nasilov, D. M.; Tenishev, E. R.; Scherbak, A. M. (1969). Древнетюркский словарь [Old Turkic Dictionary] (in Russian). Leningrad: Nauka. p. 677.
- Kurkiev, A. S. (2005). Гӏалгӏай-Эрсий дошлорг: 11142 дош [Ingush-Russian Dictionary: 11,142 Words] (in Russian). Magas: Serdalo. p. 544. ISBN 5-94452-054-X.
- Bekova, A. I.; Dudarov, Y. B.; Iliyeva, F. M.; Malsagova, L. D.; Tarieva, L. U. (2009). Гӏалгӏай-Эрсий дошлорг: 24 000 дош [Ingush-Russian Dictionary: 24,000 Words] (in Russian). Nalchik: State Enterprise of the Kabardino-Balkarian Republic “Republican Polygraphic Combine named after the 1905 Revolution”. p. 983. ISBN 978-5-88195-965-4.
- Arsenyev K. K., Petrushevsky F. F. (1894). Кавказский хребет. Энциклопедический словарь [в 86 томах] [Caucasian Range. Encyclopedic Dictionary [in 86 volumes]] (in Russian). Vol. XIII^{A} (Historical Journals – Kalaidovich). St. Petersburg: F. A. Brockhaus and I. A. Efron. pp. 850–854.
- Arsenyev K. K., Petrushevsky F. F. (1901). Терская область. Энциклопедический словарь [в 86 томах] [Terek Region. Encyclopedic Dictionary [in 86 volumes]] (in Russian). Vol. XXXIII (Thermal Sensations – Tombazi). St. Petersburg: F. A. Brockhaus and I. A. Efron. pp. 82–90.
- Schmidt, O. Yu. (1934). Чёрные горы. БСЭ [Black Mountains. Great Soviet Encyclopedia [in 65 volumes + 1 unnumbered volume (USSR)]] (in Russian). Vol. 61 (Ch – Shakht) (1st ed.). Moscow: Soviet Encyclopedia Publishing House.
- Vvedensky, B. A. (1957). B. A. Vvedensky (ed.). Чёрные горы. БСЭ [в 51 т. + 2 кн. предм.-алф. указ [Black Mountains. Great Soviet Encyclopedia [in 51 volumes + 2 index books]] (in Russian). Vol. 47 (Tsuruoka – Sherbot) (2nd ed.). Moscow: Soviet Encyclopedia Publishing House. p. 198.
- Prokhorov, A. M. (1978). "Black Mountains". БСЭ [в 30 т. (т. №24 в 2 кн.) + 1 кн. алфав.-именн. указ [Great Soviet Encyclopedia [in 30 volumes (vol. 24 in 2 books) + 1 index book]] (in Russian). Vol. 29 (Chagan – Ex-le-Bain) (3rd ed.). Moscow: Soviet Encyclopedia Publishing House. p. 106.
- Tryoshnikov, A. F. (1989). Чёрные горы // Географический энциклопедический словарь [Black Mountains. Geographical Encyclopedic Dictionary] (in Russian) (2nd, expanded ed.). Moscow: Soviet Encyclopedia Publishing House. p. 524. ISBN 5-85270-057-6.
- Grigoryev, A. A. (1964). Чёрные горы. Краткая географическая энциклопедия [5 т.] [Black Mountains. Concise Geographical Encyclopedia [in 5 volumes]] (in Russian). Vol. 4 (Soviet Socialist Republic – Yugoslavia). Moscow: Soviet Encyclopedia Publishing House. p. 337.
- Semyonov-Tyan-Shansky, P. P. (1885). Чёрные горы. Географическо-статистический словарь Российской империи [Black Mountains. Geographical-Statistical Dictionary of the Russian Empire] (in Russian). Vol. V (Taardzhal – Yaya). St. Petersburg: V. Bezobrazov and Company Printing House. pp. 689–690.
- Arsenyev, K. K.; Petrushevsky, F. F. (1903). "Black Mountains". Чёрные горы. Энциклопедический словарь [в 86 томах] [Black Mountains. Encyclopedic Dictionary [in 86 volumes]] (in Russian). Vol. XXXVIII: Human – Chuguev Regiment. St. Petersburg: F. A. Brockhaus and I. A. Efron. p. 688.
