= Khankala =

Settlement in Groznensky District, Chechen Republic, Russia

Coordinates: 43°17′49″N 45°46′12″E

Khankala (Russian: Ханкала, Chechen: Хан-ГӀала, romanized: Ẋan-Ġala) is a settlement in Groznensky District of the Chechen Republic, Russia, located to the east of Grozny, the republic's capital. Population: 7,908 (2002 census).

The settlement is the location of a Russian military base, the headquarters of the 42nd Motor Rifle Division, and an airstrip. It was the site of the Battle of Khankala in 1994.

== See also ==
- 2002 Khankala Mi-26 crash
