= Vasily Potto =

Russian military historian (1836–1911)

Vasily Aleksandrovich Potto
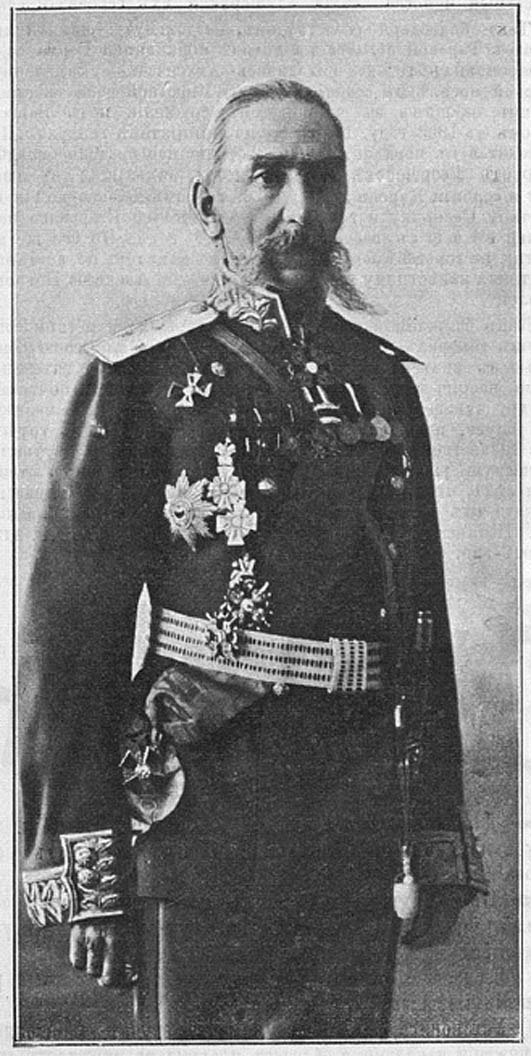
- Vasily Potto in 1909
- Born: January 1, 1836; Tula Governorate, Russian Empire
- Died: November 29, 1911 (aged 75)
- Military career
- Allegiance: Russian Empire
- Branch: Imperial Russian Army
- Service years: 1853–1911
- Rank: Lieutenant general (1907)
- Conflicts: Crimean War; Polish January Uprising
- Other work: Military historian

Vasily Aleksandrovich Potto (Russian: Василий Александрович Потто; 1 January 1836 – 29 November 1911) was a Russian lieutenant-general (1907) and military historian, known for his landmark works on the history of the Caucasian War.

== History ==
Born of a noble family of a German descent in the Tula Governorate, Potto was educated at the Orlovsky Bakhtin Cadet Corps. He served as a captain in the Crimean War (1853–55) and took part in putting down the Polish January Uprising (1863–64). In 1887 Colonel Potto was attached to the staff of the Caucasus Military District, where he was appointed head of the military and historical department in 1899. During his tenure in the Caucasus, Potto collected pieces of folk literature of the Caucasian mountain peoples and the Cossacks. He exploited his access to vast historical and first-hand material and produced a series of works pertaining to the Russian conquest of the Caucasus, including his monumental five-volume The Caucasian War in Different Essays, Episodes, Legends, and Biographies (1885–91).
