= Bey-Bulat Taymiev =

Bey-Bulat Taimin
- Born: c. 1779
- Died: 14 July 1832 (aged 52–53); Tangi-Chu, Chechnya, Caucasian Imamate
- Military career
- Allegiance: Chechnya; Caucasian Imamate
- Service years: 1802–1831
- Rank: General
- Conflicts: Caucasian War Chechen raid on Nazran (1810)

Bey-Bulat Taimin or Bey-Bulat Taimiev (Note: Chechen: Тайми Биболт, romanized: Taymi Bibolt; Russian: Бейбулат Таймиев, romanized: Beybulat Taimiev) (c. 1779–1832) was a North Caucasian military and political leader of Chechen origin from the Bilto teip, who led military campaigns against the Russian expansion in the North Caucasus, but also developed diplomatic relations with the Russians. In Chechen folklore, he is remembered as a figure of outstanding courage.

== Historical role ==
Bey-Bulat is an important figure in the history of resistance to colonialism in Chechnya, described as Chechnya's "greatest and most famous war leader" and by the Russian poet Alexandr Pushkin as "The renowned Bey-Bulat, the most feared man in the Caucasus". He may well be considered also as the first Chechen diplomat for his negotiating efforts at the height of armed clashes between mountaineers and regular troops. Taimin was a flexible politician and diplomat. He wanted good neighbourly relations between his people and the people of Russia, so he aimed at reconciling the interests of the two and called for peace talks. To this end, Taimin often met with the tsar's commissioner in the North Caucasus, General Yermolov. He established diplomatic contacts with Iran and Turkey and went to visit the countries personally.

Many historians say the role of Taimin in the political life of the North Caucasus in the first three decades of the 19th century was that of the leader of rebellions by Chechen and Ingush peoples. Among the uprisings that he led against the Russians was that in the name of Islam in 1825. However, he used his position to prevent revolts by mountaineers from turning into bloodshed and robbery. Taking the command of the mutinies, Taimin never stopped his diplomatic activity. The circumstances of his death remain unclear.

The political activity of Taimin lasted for 30 years. Sympathizing with his views, his struggle for independence and fair relations with Russia were Pushkin, Alexandr Griboyedov, the Decembrists, and later Mikhail Lermontov and Leo Tolstoy.

== In folklore ==
Though a real historical figure, Bey-Bulat Taimin is also a leading character of Chechen folklore. In poems and songs he is depicted as a legendary dare-devil. In oral narrative, the name of Bey-Bulat is associated with courage or reckless boldness.
