= Chechen–Russian conflict =

Centuries-long theater of the Russo-Caucasian conflict

- Part of Russo-Caucasian conflict
- Location of the Chechen Republic (red) within the Russian Federation
Date	8 March 1785 – 19 December 2017 (232 years, 9 months, 1 week and 4 days) (recent phase: 1991–2017)
Location	North Caucasus
Result	Russian victory; end of conflict proclaimed in 2017; Several wars between Russian and Chechen forces resulted in: Russian victory (1708, 1722, 1757, 1770, 1791, 1822, 1861, 1864, 1877, 1921, 1929, 1944); Khasavyurt Accord (1996); Russian victory (2009); Islamic State insurgency
Territorial changes	Chechnya incorporated into Russia as the Terek Oblast after the Murid War (1859–1917); Chechen independence in the MRNC (1917–1922); Chechen AO (later Checheno-Ingush AO) incorporated into the Soviet Union (1922–1936); Checheno-Ingush ASSR incorporated into the Russian SFSR (1936–1944; 1957–1991); Provisional government supported by Nazi Germany (1940–1944); Deportation of the Chechens and Ingush to Central Asia (1944–1957); Independence as the Chechen Republic of Ichkeria (1991–2000); Russia topples the leadership of Chechnya (2000–2017)

Belligerents
Chechen states, militants and allied groups	Russian Federation; (1991–2017)
Including: Caucasus Emirate; (2007–2017); Chechen Republic of Ichkeria; (1991–2007); Confederation of Mountain Peoples of the Caucasus; (1989–2000); North Caucasus National Committee; (1940–1944); Red Chechens; (1917–1922); Mountain Republic; (1917–1922); Caucasian Imamate; (1828–1859); Sheikh Mansur Movement; (1785–1791)	Preceded by: Soviet Union; (1922–1991); Soviet Russia; (1917–1922); (Russia) (Russia) Russian State; (1917–1920); Russian Empire; (1785–1917)

The Chechen–Russian conflict (Russian: Чеченский конфликт, romanized: Chechensky konflikt; Chechen: Нохчийн-Оьрсийн дов, romanized: Noxçiyn-Örsiyn dov) was the centuries-long ethnic and political conflict, often armed, between the Russian, Soviet and Imperial Russian governments and various Chechen forces. The recent phase of the conflict started after the dissolution of the Soviet Union in 1991 and ended with the oppression of Chechen separatist leaders and crushing of the separatist movement in the republic proper in 2017.

Formal hostilities in Chechnya date back to 1785, though elements of the conflict can be traced back considerably further. The Russian Empire ostensibly had little interest in the North Caucasus other than as a communication route to its ally the Kingdom of Kartli-Kakheti (eastern Georgia) and its enemies, the Persian and Ottoman Empires, but growing tensions triggered by Russian activities in the region resulted in an uprising of Chechens against the Russian presence in 1785, followed by further clashes and the outbreak of the Caucasian War in 1817. Russia officially won against the Imamate in 1864 but only succeeded in defeating the Chechen forces in 1877.

During the Russian Civil War, Chechens and other Caucasian nations lived in independence for a few years before being Sovietized in 1921. In 1944 on the grounds of dubious allegations of widespread collaboration with the advancing German forces, the Chechen nation as a collective were deported to Central Asia.

The most recent conflicts between the Chechen and Russian governments began in the 1990s. As the Soviet Union disintegrated, the Chechens declared independence in 1991. By late 1994, the First Chechen War broke out, and after two years of fighting, the Russian government negotiated a ceasefire in August 1996. In 1999, the fighting restarted, resulting in yet another major armed conflict, with a large number of casualties on both sides. There was vast destruction of the Chechen capital in the battle of Grozny. The Russian military established control over Chechnya in late April 2000, ending the major combat phase of the war, with insurgency and hostilities continuing for several years. The end of the conflict was proclaimed by Russian authorities in 2017, ending a centuries-old struggle, at least in name. However, armed Chechen groups continue to operate in opposition to Russian forces in Ukraine and Syria.

== Origins ==
The North Caucasus, a mountainous region that includes Chechnya, spans or lies close to important trade and communication routes between Russia and the Middle East, control of which have been fought over by various powers for millennia. Russia's entry into the region followed Tsar Ivan the Terrible's conquest of the Golden Horde's Khanates of Kazan and Astrakhan in 1556, initiating a long struggle for control of the North Caucasus routes with other contemporary powers including Persia, the Ottoman Empire and the Crimean Khanate.

During the 16th century, the Russian Tsardom tried to win influence in the North Caucasus by allying themselves with local princes such as the Temryuk of Kabardia and Shikh-Murza Okotsky of Chechnya. Temryuk controlled the Northwest Caucasus and with Russia's help he managed to stave off Crimean incursions. Northeast Caucasus was largely controlled by Shamkhal princes, Avar khans and the powerful Chechen princes Prince Shikh whose influence reached all of Northeast Caucasus. These princes bought weapons and settled Russian Cossacks near the Terek river to strengthen their rule and influence. Prince Shikh Okotsky had in his army around 500 Cossacks combined with 1,000 Okocheni (the Chechens of Aukh), and often waged anti-Iranian and anti-Ottoman campaigns in Dagestan.

Prince Shikh's politics gave the Russian Tsardom more influence in the Northeast Caucasus, several Russian forts were set up along the Terek river (among them the stronghold of Terki) and Cossack villages. Prior to this the Cossacks had almost no presence in Chechnya and Dagestan. These villages and forts caused Chechens to distrust Prince Shikh since forts were built on Chechen owned pastures. The Michkizi (lowland Chechens) and part of the Okoki (a Chechen tribe of Aukh) that were loyal to the Chechen Mullah Mayda joined the outcast Kumyk prince Sultan-Mut who for a very long time allied with the Chechens living south of the Terek-Sulak interfluve. Sultan-Mut was at first against the Russian policies in the Caucasus, he along with the Chechens, Kumyks and Avars fought Russian Cossacks and burned down Russian forts. The Russian Tsar countered this by sending military expeditions into Dagestan. Both of these expeditions resulted in Russian defeat and culminated in the Battle of the Karaman Field where a Dagestani-Chechen army under Sultan-Mut defeated the Russian army. These failed expeditions and battles by Russia led to the weakening of Prince Shikh and his assassination in 1596 by one of Sultan-Mut's brothers.

Sultan-Mut continued to pursue an anti-Russian policy into the early 17th century and was known to sometimes live among the Chechens and with them raid the Russian Cossacks. However, this started to change as Sultan-Mut several times tried to join the Russians and asked for a citizenship. This switch of policy angered many Chechens and led to them distancing from Sultan-Mut. This caused a mistrust in Aukh between the people of Endirey (Chechen-Kumyk city controlled by the Sultan-Mut family and his Chechen Sala-Uzden allies) and the Aukh Chechens.

In 1774, Russia gained control of Ossetia, and with it the strategically important Darial Pass, from the Ottomans. A few years later, in 1783, Russia signed the Treaty of Georgievsk with Heraclius II of the Kingdom of Kartli-Kakheti, making the eastern Georgian kingdom—a Christian enclave surrounded by hostile Muslim states—a Russian protectorate. To fulfill her obligations under the treaty, Catherine the Great, Empress of Russia, began construction of the Georgian Military Road through the Darial Pass, along with a series of military forts to protect the route. These activities, however, antagonized the Chechens, who saw the forts both as an encroachment on the traditional territories of the mountaineers and as a potential threat.

== History ==
=== Chechen conflict with the Russian Empire ===
==== Murat Kuchukov's insurgency ====
The first significant conflict between the Chechens (and other North Caucasian peoples) and the Russians broke out in 1708. This conflict was primarily driven by the actions of corrupt governors, local princes, and the imposition of discriminatory policies and taxes on the North Caucasian population. Tensions were further fueled by Murat Kuchukov, a Bashkir religious and military leader allied with the Turlov prince, Amirkhamza Turlov. As a result of Kuchukov's teachings, Kuchukov rallied over 1,600 fighters from across the North Caucasus, including 700 from the Chechen plain. Notably, a large portion of Kuchukov's forces were Aukhs.

In February 1708, these forces launched an assault on the Terki Fortress. However, the arrival of Russian and Kalmyk reinforcements turned the tide against the rebels. Ultimately, Murat Kuchukov was captured and subsequently executed, marking a decisive defeat for the North Caucasian insurgents.

==== Sheikh Mansur Movement and aftermath, 1785–1794 ====
Around this time, Sheikh Mansur, a Chechen imam, began preaching a purified version of Islam and encouraging the various mountain peoples of the North Caucasus to unite under the banner of Islam in order to protect themselves from further foreign encroachments. His activities were seen by the Russians as a threat to their own interests in the region, and in 1785, a 3,000 strong was sent to capture him. Failing to do so, it burned his unoccupied home village instead, but the force was ambushed by Mansur's followers on its return journey and annihilated, beginning the first Chechen–Russian war. Mansur grew in popularity and soon several thousand people from across the North Caucasus came to join his army. However, he failed to capture the fortresses of Kizlyar twice (Note: See: Siege of Kizlyar (July 1785); Siege of Kizlyar (August 1785)) and Grigoriopolis, after which many of his supporters left him. During his Campaign to Kabardia he suffered a crushing defeat at Tatartup. From there on began the decline of the insurgency, although Mansur continued mobilizing fighters, but in June 1787, he only managed to gather 1,000 men, who also soon left him after showing indecisivness in his campaigns. He left for Circassia in July of the same year, where he quickly gained the support of the Circassians. However, there he also suffered several heavy defeats, most notably during the battle of the Urup River, where he was almost hit by an arrow and barely managed to escape through the mountains. The insurgency was eventually put down after his final defeat at Anapa in July 1791, where he was captured. Mansur died in captivity in 1794.

==== Caucasian and Crimean Wars, 1817–64 ====
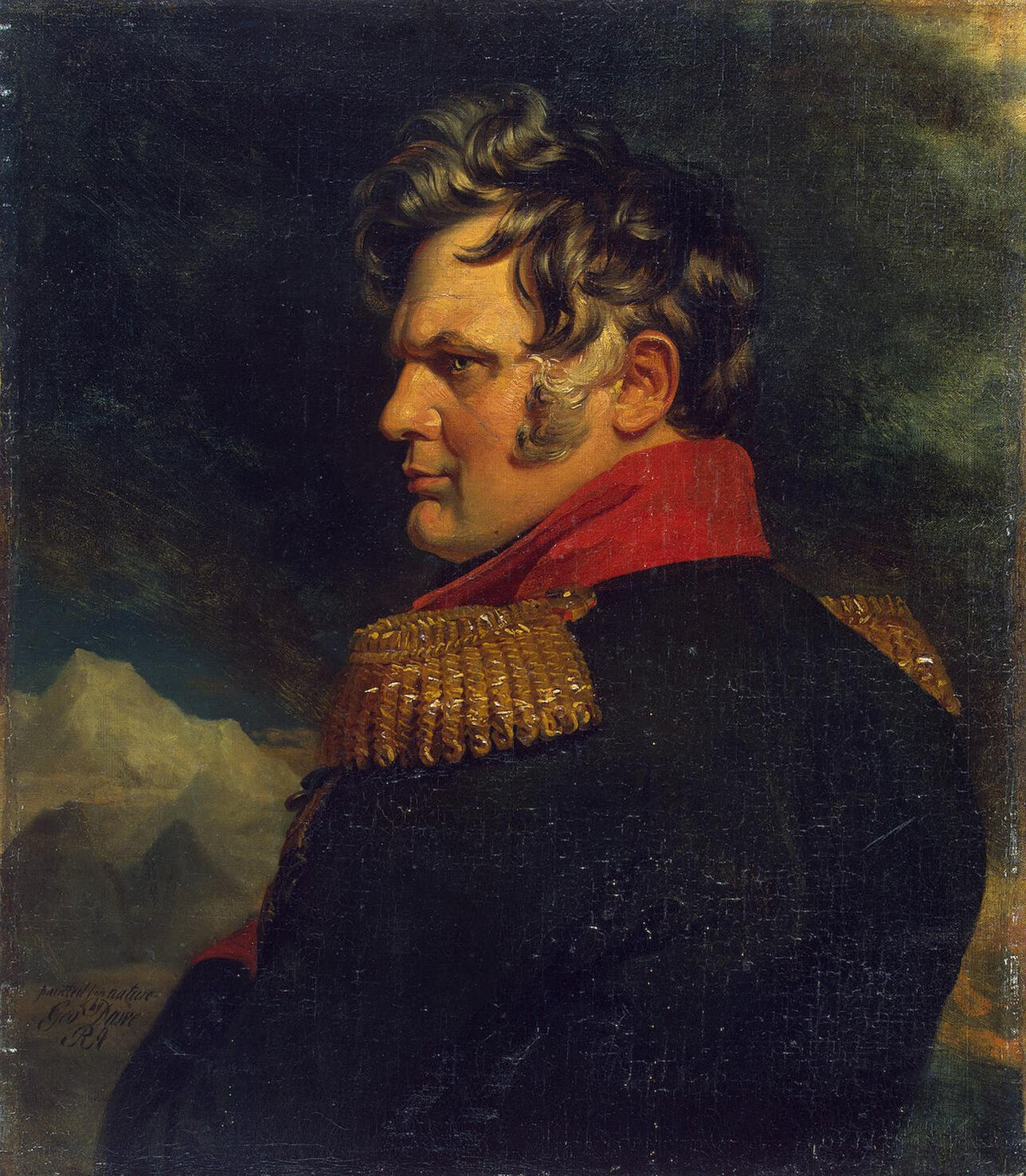
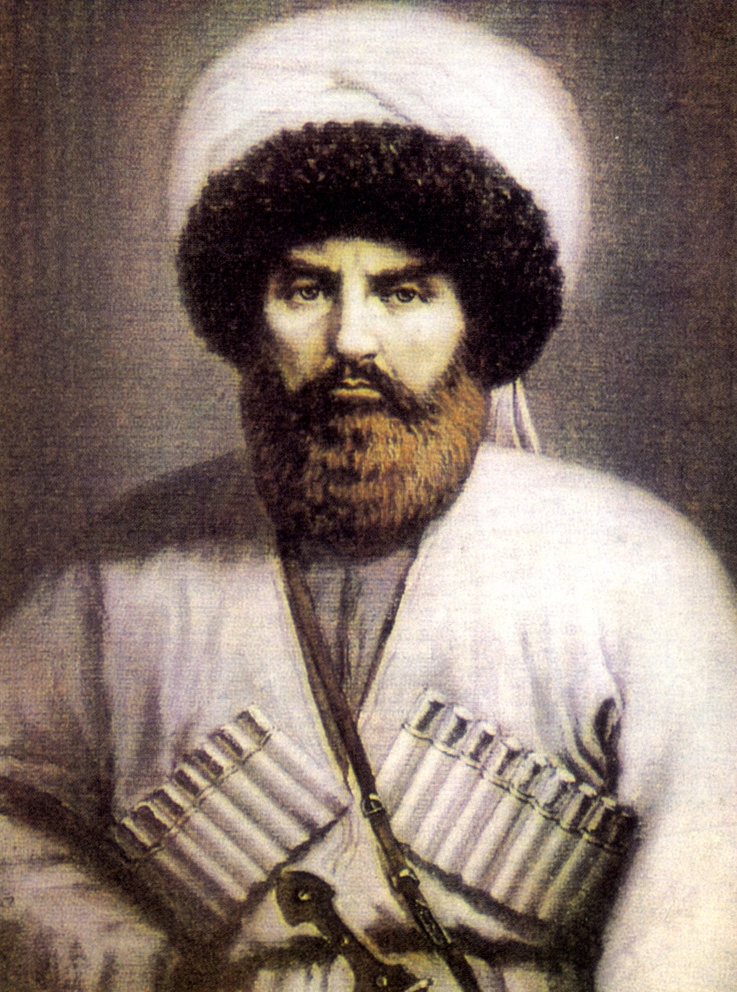
General Yermolov (left) and Imam Shamil (right)

After Russia's defeat of French Napoleonic forces in the 1812 war, Tsar Alexander I turned his attentions once more to the North Caucasus, assigning one of his most celebrated generals, Aleksey Petrovich Yermolov, to the conquest of the region. In 1817, Russian forces under Yermolov's command embarked upon the conquest of the Caucasus. Yermolov's brutal tactics, which included economic warfare, collective punishment and forcible deportations, were initially successful, but have been described as counterproductive since they effectively ended Russian influence on Chechen society and culture and ensured the Chechens' enduring enmity. Yermolov was not relieved of command until 1827.

A turning point in the conflict was marked in 1828 when the Muridism movement emerged. It was led by Imam Shamil, a Dagestani Avar. In 1834 he united the Northeast Caucasus nations under Islam and declared "holy war" on Russia. In 1845 Shamil's forces surrounded and killed thousands of Russian soldiers and several generals in Dargo, forcing them to retreat.

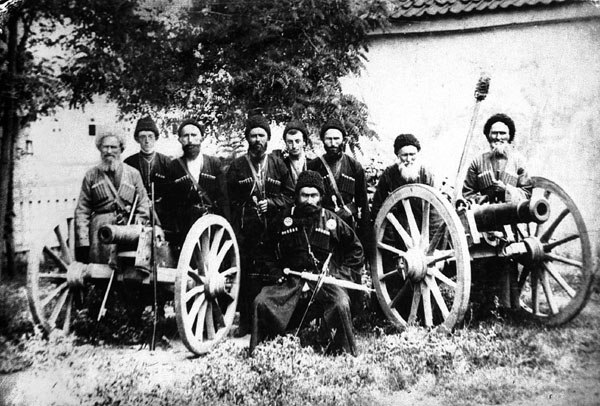
Chechen artillerymen in 1885

During the Crimean War of 1853–1856, the Chechens supported the Ottoman Empire against Russia. However, internal tribal conflicts weakened Shamil and he was captured in 1859. The war formally ended in 1862 when Russia promised autonomy for Chechnya and other Caucasian ethnic groups. However, Chechnya and the surrounding region, including northern Dagestan, were incorporated into the Russian Empire as the Terek Oblast. Some Chechens have perceived Shamil's surrender as a betrayal, thus creating friction between Dagestanis and Chechens in this conflict, with the Dagestanis being frequently accused by Chechens as Russian collaborators.

=== Russian Civil War and Soviet period ===
After the Russian Revolution, the peoples of the North Caucasus came to establish the Mountainous Republic of the Northern Caucasus. It existed until 1921, when they were forced to accept Soviet rule. Joseph Stalin personally held negotiations with the Caucasian leaders in 1921 and promised a wide autonomy inside the Soviet state. The Mountain Autonomous Soviet Socialist Republic was created that year, but only lasted until 1924 when it was abolished and six republics were created. The Checheno–Ingush Autonomous Soviet Socialist Republic was established in 1934. Confrontations between the Chechens and the Soviet government arose in the late 1920s during collectivization. It declined by the mid-1930s after local leaders were arrested or killed. The Chechen uprising of 1932 broke out in early 1932 and was defeated in March.

==== Ethnic cleansing of Chechens from their homeland ====
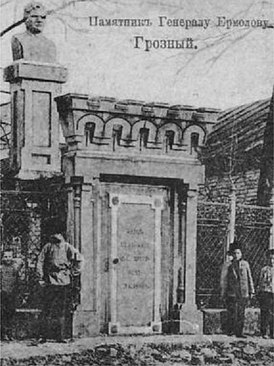
Statue of Aleksey Yermolov in Grozny with one of his quotes in reference to Chechens: "There is no people more vile and insidious under the sun." The statue was reinstated in 1949, four years after the Chechens were ethnically cleansed from their homeland, and it stood until 1989. In modern times Yermolov has been accused of genocide.

Nazi Germany invaded the Soviet Union in June 1941. Soviet historiography falsely accuses Chechens of joining the Wehrmacht en masse, although this notion is not accepted in any other academic instances. Modern Russian historiography itself also admits that there is little merit to these accusations. By January 1943, the German retreat started, while the Soviet government began discussing the deportation of Chechen and Ingush people far from the North Caucasus, this was despite the fact Chechens and Ingush served in the Red Army like any other of the nations in the Soviet Union. In February 1944, under the direct command of Lavrentiy Beria, almost half a million Chechens and Ingush were removed from their homes and forcibly settled in Central Asia in an act of ethnic cleansing. They were put in forced labor camps in Kazakhstan and Kirghizia. Estimates on casualties range from 170,000 up to 200,000, with some evidence also indicating that 400,000 people perished. The victims perished mostly due to hypothermia (freezing to death) and starvation, although massacres were not uncommon. The most notable of the massacres during the deportation was the Khaibakh massacre, in which an estimated 700 Chechen children, elderly and women were locked in a barn and burned alive, reportedly due to problems with their transportation. Mikhail Gvishiani, the officer responsible for the massacre was praised and promised a medal by Beria himself. A 2004 European Parliament resolution states that the deportation was a genocide.

==== Ethnic clashes (1958–65) ====
In 1957, Chechens were allowed to return to their homes. The Checheno–Ingush Autonomous Soviet Socialist Republic was reestablished. The violence began in 1958, upon a conflict between a Russian sailor and an Ingush youngster over a girl, in which the Russian was fatally injured. The incident quickly deteriorated into mass ethnic riots, as Slavic mobs attacked Chechens and Ingushes and looted their property throughout the region for four days. Ethnic clashes continued through the 1960s, and in 1965 some 16 clashes were reported, with 185 severe injuries, 19 of them fatal. By the late 1960s, the region calmed down and the Chechen–Russian conflict came to its lowest point until the dissolution of the Soviet Union and the eruption of Chechen Wars in 1990.

=== Post-Soviet era ===
==== Chechen Wars ====
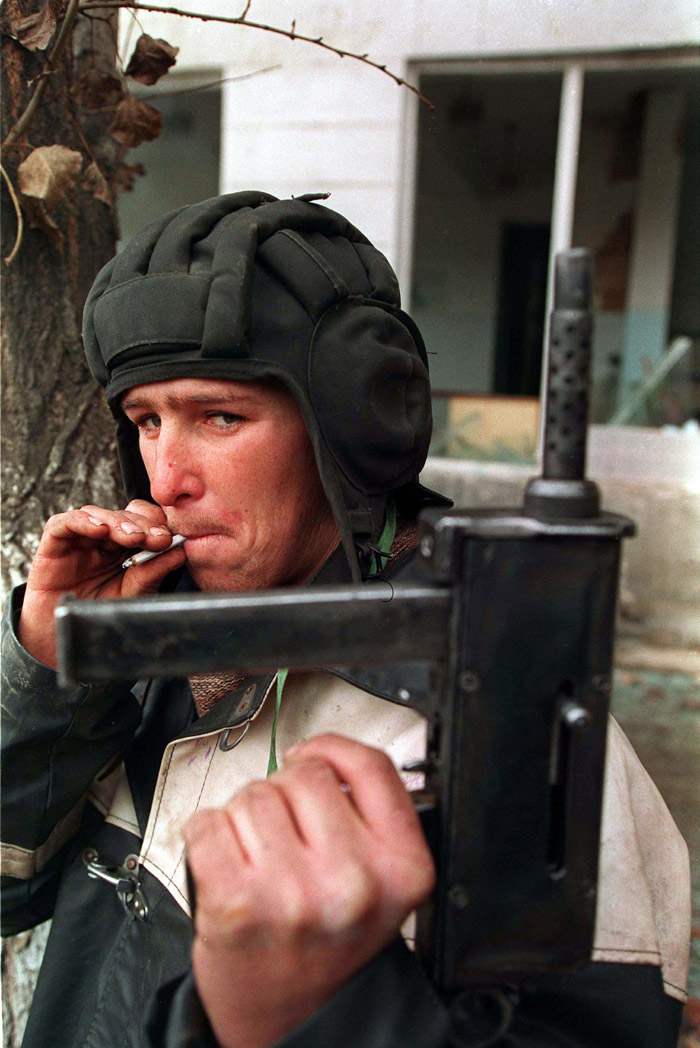
A Chechen fighter with a Borz submachine gun, 1995

In 1991, following the Chechen Revolution, Chechnya declared independence as the Chechen Republic of Ichkeria. According to some sources, from 1991 to 1994, tens of thousands of people of non-Chechen ethnicity (mostly Russians, Ukrainians and Armenians) left the republic amidst reports of violence and discrimination against the non-Chechen population. Other sources do not identify displacement as a significant factor in the events of the period, instead focusing on the deteriorating domestic situation within Chechnya, the aggressive politics of the Chechen president, Dzhokhar Dudayev, and the domestic political ambitions of Russian president Boris Yeltsin. Russian Army forces were commanded into Grozny in 1994 but, after two years of intense fighting, the Russian troops eventually withdrew from Chechnya under the Khasavyurt Accord. Chechnya preserved its de facto independence until the second war broke out in 1999.

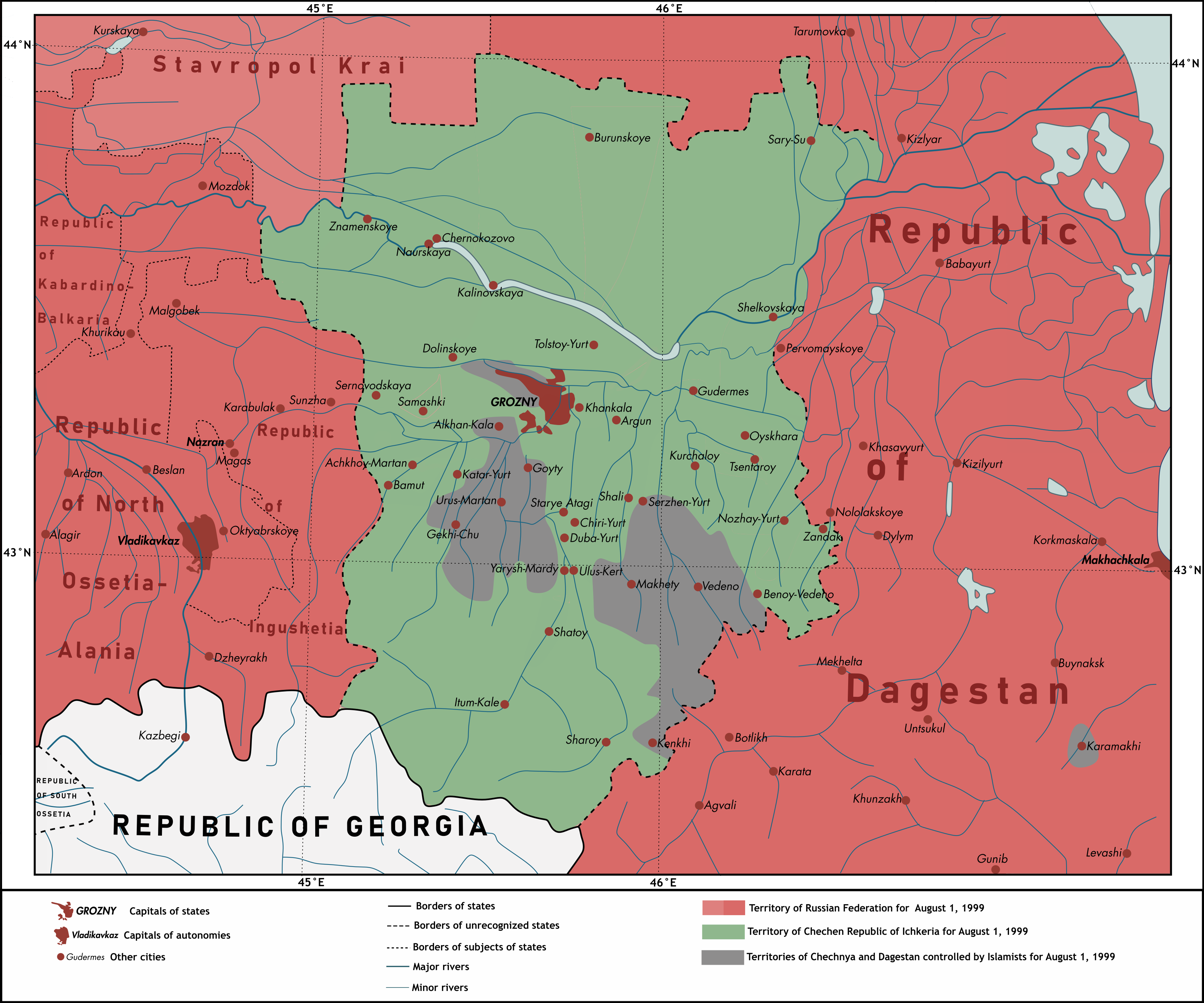
Situation in Chechnya in the period between the end of the First Chechen War and the beginning of the Second Chechen War: In red the territory under the control of the Russian Federation in green the territory under the control of the Chechen Republic of Ichkeria and in grey the areas under the control of the islamists.

In 1999, the Russian government forces started an anti-terrorist campaign in Chechnya, in response to the invasion of Dagestan by Chechen-based Islamic forces. By early 2000 Russia almost completely destroyed the city of Grozny and succeeded in putting Chechnya under direct control of Moscow by late April.

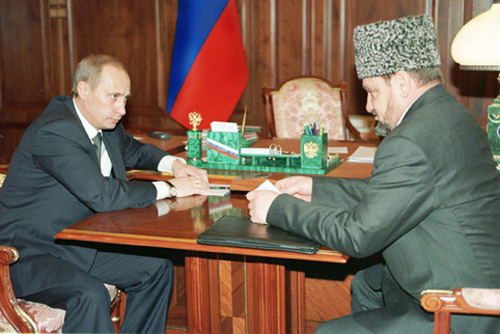
Akhmad Kadyrov (right), formerly a leading separatist mufti, had switched sides in 2000

==== Chechen insurgency ====
Since the end of the Second Chechen War in May 2000, low-level insurgency has continued, particularly in Chechnya, Ingushetia and Dagestan. Russian security forces have succeeded in eliminating some of their leaders, such as Shamil Basayev, who was killed on 10 July 2006. After Basayev's death, Dokka Umarov took the leadership of the rebel forces in North Caucasus until his death, owing to poisoning, in 2013.

Islamists from Chechnya and other North Caucasian republics have been blamed for a number of terrorist attacks throughout Russia, most notably the Russian apartment bombings in 1999, the Moscow theater hostage crisis in 2002, the Beslan school hostage crisis in 2004, the 2010 Moscow Metro bombings and the Domodedovo International Airport bombing in 2011.

Currently, Chechnya is now under the rule of its Russian-appointed leader Ramzan Kadyrov. Though the oil-rich region has maintained relative stability under Kadyrov, he has been accused by critics and citizens of suppressing freedom of the press and violating other political and human rights. Because of this continued Russian rule, there were minor guerilla attacks by separatist groups in the area. Further adding to the tension, jihadist groups aligned with the Islamic State and Al-Qaeda existed in the region.

Sociologist Georgi Derluguian described the situation in Chechnya as follows:

And during the second war, after 1999, the Russians adopted a strategy which they thought was very smart – using elements of the Chechen resistance, who previously fought against the Russians but were lured to the Russian side, as death squads. But when you use, basically, pirates and rogues as death squads and you entrust local power to them as the occupational authority, the result is that you destroy whatever is left of regular governance structures.

Although insurgency between the Russian government and the Chechen militants ended in 2017, elimination of militants continued afterwards.

=== Outside Russia ===
The conflict between Chechens and Russians is also seen outside the Russian border. During the Syrian Civil War, Chechen fighters that remain loyal to the collapsed Chechen Republic of Ichkeria and radical Chechen Islamists had also fought against Russian Army and its ally Bashar al-Assad in Syria, with desire to overthrow the Assad Government and replace it by a more Chechen-sympathized government.

In 2014, many anti-Russian Chechens volunteered to fight in the war in Donbas against Russia and the Russian separatist forces in Donbas as part of the Ukrainian volunteer battalions, forming the Sheikh Mansur and Dzhokhar Dudayev Battalions. The pro-Ukrainian Chechens see the Russo-Ukrainian War as a contribution to the larger anti-Russian struggle. While Chechen forces under Kadyrov have been present both during the annexation of Crimea by the Russian Federation and the subsequent War in Donbas.

On 23 August 2019, Zelimkhan Khangoshvili, a former military platoon commander for the Chechen Republic of Ichkeria during the Second Chechen War, was assassinated in a Berlin park, by a Russian FSB agent who was subsequently sentenced to life imprisonment by a German court.

Chechnya had significant involvement with the 2022 Russian invasion of Ukraine, pro-Russian Kadyrovites from Chechnya were deployed in Ukraine as a boost to the Russian forces. Western sources described the deployment of Chechen Kadyrovites as "leveraging the very presence of Chechen soldiers in Ukraine as a psychological weapon against Ukrainians". While the Ukrainian Chechen volunteer battalions resumed their fight against the Russian forces.

== Casualties ==
The exact number of Chechen casualties of this conflict are difficult to ascertain due to lack of records and the long time period of the clashes. One source indicates that at least 60,000 Chechens were killed in the First and Second Chechen War in the 1990s and 2000s alone. High estimates of these two wars range of up to 150,000 or 160,000 killed, as put by Taus Djabrailov, the head of Chechnya's interim Parliament.

According to the Russian Ministry of Ethnic Affairs, more than 21,000 Russians were killed in Chechnya from 1991 to 1999 (not counting those killed in military operations).

== See also ==
- Chechen involvement in the Russian invasion of Ukraine
- Islamic State insurgency in the North Caucasus
