= Battle of the Malka =

1785 conflict on the Malka river

- Part of Campaign to Kabardia of the Sheikh Mansur Movement
Date	30 October 1785
Location	Malka River, Kabardia (Near the Grigoriopolis redoubt)
Result	Inconclusive

Belligerents
Sheikh Mansur Movement: Chechens; Kabardians; Kumyks; Lezgins; Avars	Russian Empire

Commanders and leaders
Sheikh Mansur	(Russian Empire) Larion Nagel

Units involved
Unknown	Second Moscow Regiment; Kabardian Regiment: 1 Grenadier Battalion; Selenga Regiment: 1 Grenadier Battalion; Astrakhan Dragoon Regiment: 2 Squadrons; Mozdok Cossack Regiment; Cossacks

Strength
6,000	4,000

The Battle of the Malka River, also known as the Battle of Grigoriopolis (Note: Not to be confused with the Battle of Grigoriopolis of July 1785) took place on 30 October 1785, between the Russian Empire and the forces of Sheikh Mansur. The five hour–long battle ended in no deciding victory for either side.

== History ==
=== Prelude ===
Mansur had previously attempted to advance to Kabardia, where he would join forces with the Kabardians and conduct joined actions. However, upon receiving news that the Russian army was waiting for him there, and, especially since his army was running out of food, he tried occupying the Chervlenaya village, but a Russian detachment which had followed him, repelled the attack.
Mansur was in a difficult situation, as several days passed and his food supply was running out. He decided to go to Kabardia and restock on supplies. However, there, the detachment of Colonel Larion Nagel was waiting for him.

=== Battle ===
Mounted patrols of Sheikh Mansur, who always moved ahead of the rest of the mountaineer army, informed Mansur that the Russian forces were planning to ambush his army.
Mansurs troops quickly occupied the forest and gorges, thus completely surrounding the Russian detachment of Nagel. Then, the Russian troops advanced, and the highlanders began feinting a retreat, while also opening heavy fire on the Russian troops. Mansur's plan was to lure the Russian forces into the forest, where the North Caucasians had a clear advantage in fighting. Nagel however did not fall for the trick. Thus, the Russian advance stopped and waited for reinforcements to arrive.
Unlike the Russians, the rebels could not wait long, as their food supply was running out.ITt was necessary to get to the Kabardian villages as soon as possible. Mansur sent their compatriot, Prince Dol, to the residents of Greater Kabarda with the message that they needed to prepare food, since he would soon arrive to them with his army. This will happen as soon as he defeats the royal troops, which are already surrounded by him on all sides. Through Prince Dol, Mansur convinced the Kabardians that he would certainly defeat Nagel’s detachment or cut off the water in the mountain rivers, which would force the Russians to surrender.
At dawn of 30 October, Mansur launched an attack on the detachment from several sides. A fierce battle broke out, but ended in no deciding victory for either side. The mountaineers retreated back into the forest and closed several mountain rivers, which forced Nagel's army to leave and approach the fortified town of Tatartup. A few days later, Mansur attacked the fortification in what would become the Battle of Tatartup.

== See also ==
- Siege of Kizlyar (August 1785) — Last major battle between Mansur and the Russian Empire
- Battle of Tatartup — Next major battle between Mansur and the Russian Empire
