= Zolskoye Uprising =

Zolskoye Uprising (1913)
- Part of Russo-Caucasian conflict
Date	21–22 July 1913
Location	Zolskaya, Terek Oblast, Russian Empire
Result	Revolt suppressed by Russian forces; Dozens arrested and prosecuted; Harsh reprisals carried out against peasant communities

Belligerents
Kabardians; Supported by: Balkars	Russian Empire

Commanders and leaders
Unknown local leaders	Lt. Col. Klishbiev; Bekkourza Karaev

Strength
~Several hundred armed peasants	~500 cavalry troops (with artillery and machine guns)

Casualties and losses
Unknown	Unknown

The Zolskoye Uprising (also known as the Zolskaya Revolt) was a peasant uprising that occurred in July 1913 in the village of Zolskaya and surrounding areas in the Terek Oblast of the Russian Empire. It was part of a broader wave of social unrest in the North Caucasus driven by economic hardship, feudal exploitation, and colonial repression. Closely linked to the Cherek Uprising of the same year, the revolt reflected growing discontent among the Kabardian and Balkar peasantry.

== Background ==
During the early 20th century, tensions in the North Caucasus intensified due to land confiscations, forced labor, and feudal obligations enforced by local nobility known as taubiy (mountain lords). In the region of Zolskaya, land hunger and inequality triggered mounting dissatisfaction. Many peasants, recently freed from serfdom, remained dependent on large landowners and subject to punitive taxes and restrictions.

The immediate cause of the Zolskoye Uprising was widespread discontent with the abuses of local elites and resentment toward the privileged Zhankhotov family, who owned a large estate in the region. The revolt was also encouraged by the concurrent uprising in the Cherek Gorge.

== The Uprising ==
On 21 July 1913, rumors of a planned attack on the Zhankhotov estate reached the authorities. The Zhankhotov family fled their estate near Zolskaya and hid their valuables in nearby forests. The following morning, columns of armed peasants from Upper and Lower Shkanta marched toward the estate.

Upon arrival, the rebels:

- Freed imprisoned arabschiks (debt laborers) from the cellar.
- Released livestock and destroyed property.
- Demolished the two-story manor house and a stone wall surrounding the estate.
- Blocked roads and filled defensive ditches to deny access to government reinforcements.

The entire action took approximately two hours. The peasants then dispersed and returned to their villages, expecting retaliation.

== Government Response ==
On 24 July, officer Bekkourza Karaev arrived in the village of Balkaria with a small police detachment and summoned a public assembly of nearly 1,000 residents. Despite intense questioning, local villagers refused to identify ringleaders. They declared that the attack on the Zhankhotov estate was a collective act carried out by the whole community.

Karaev reported to the district governor that identifying agitators was impossible "due to the solidarity of the population."

On 25–26 July, a punitive cavalry unit of 500 troops with artillery and machine guns entered the Cherek and Zolskaya regions. On 30 July 1913, prominent figures Mirza Tsoraev, Khadzhimurza Mokaev, and Magomed Orakov were arrested for allegedly leading the unrest. In total, 58 individuals were criminally charged.

== Aftermath ==
Initially, the Russian legal system considered sentencing many of the accused to hard labor. However, following public pressure and recognition of the economic roots of the revolt, some legal concessions were made. In appeals, the events were described as stemming from "economic and class hostility between peasants and taubiy."

By 1915, the official stance shifted, and the uprising was increasingly framed as a local dispute with the Zhankhotovs, rather than a broader class rebellion. High-ranking officials, including Lt. Col. Klishbiev and Karaev, later withdrew or downplayed their original testimonies about the collective nature of the uprising.

== Legacy ==
The Zolskoye Uprising was one of several anti-feudal and anti-colonial revolts that erupted in the North Caucasus in the early 20th century. Though ultimately suppressed, it exposed the deep divisions between the ruling elite and the rural population, and it highlighted the willingness of Kabardian and Balkar peasants to resist exploitation.

The revolt also forced the Russian imperial authorities to make temporary concessions and highlighted the fragility of colonial rule in the region. Together with the Cherek Uprising, it helped lay the groundwork for further unrest leading up to the Russian Revolution.

== See also ==
- Cherek Uprising (1913)
- Kabardino-Balkaria
