= Cherek Uprising (1913) =

- Part of Russo-Caucasian conflict
Date	22 July 1913
Location	Terek Oblast, Russian Empire (today Cherek Gorge, Kabardino-Balkaria)
Result	Destruction of the Zhankhotov estate; Arrest of leaders and suppression of the uprising; 58 participants prosecuted

Belligerents
Balkars; Supported by: Kabardians	Russian Empire

Commanders and leaders
Mirza Tsoraev; Khadzhimurza Mokaev; Magomed Orakov	(Russian Empire) Bekkourza Karaev (Russian Empire) Lt. Col. Klishbiev

Strength
~700+ armed peasants (estimate)	Unknown, but more ~500 cavalry troops (reinforcements, 25–26 July)

Casualties and losses
Unknown	Unknown

The 1913 Cherek Uprising was a peasant revolt that occurred in the Cherek Gorge of the Terek Oblast (present-day Kabardino-Balkaria), part of the Russian Empire, in July 1913. It was triggered by widespread discontent among Balkar peasants over the privatization and sale of communal forest lands by local feudal elites, known as taubii, particularly the Zhankhotov and Zhenokov families.

== Background ==
In the 19th century, Balkar communities held extensive communal pasture and forest lands. However, from the 1880s onward, local taubii began registering these lands as private property and selling them to outside merchants. In 1912–1913, the Karasuy and Babugent forests were sold to timber merchants Bondarenko and Saferov, cutting peasants off from traditional access to firewood.

The situation worsened when hired guards began detaining and beating peasants for collecting wood. On 19 July 1913, several peasants were arrested and imprisoned in a cellar on the Zhankhotov estate, sparking mass outrage.

== The Uprising ==
On 22 July 1913, approximately 700 peasants from 20 villages in the Cherek Gorge organized a coordinated march to the Zhankhotov estate. The estate had already been abandoned by its owners, who had sent warnings to local authorities and moved valuables into the forest.

The rebels:

- Freed imprisoned peasants and released livestock
- Deployed an armed group to guard against military response from Nalchik
- Demolished the two-story Zhankhotov house, stone fences, and a trench blocking the Karasuy forest road
- Dumped all stone material into the Cherek River

The uprising lasted only a few hours. After destroying the estate, the rebels peacefully dispersed.

== Government Response ==
On 24 July, Bekkourza Karaev convened a mass assembly in an attempt to identify leaders. Over 1,000 villagers attended but refused to name anyone, insisting that the action was communal. On 25–26 July, a 500-strong cavalry unit with artillery arrived in the gorge.

On 30 July, three leaders—Mirza Tsoraev, Khadzhimurza Mokaev, and Magomed Orakov—were arrested and imprisoned. A total of 58 individuals were indicted.

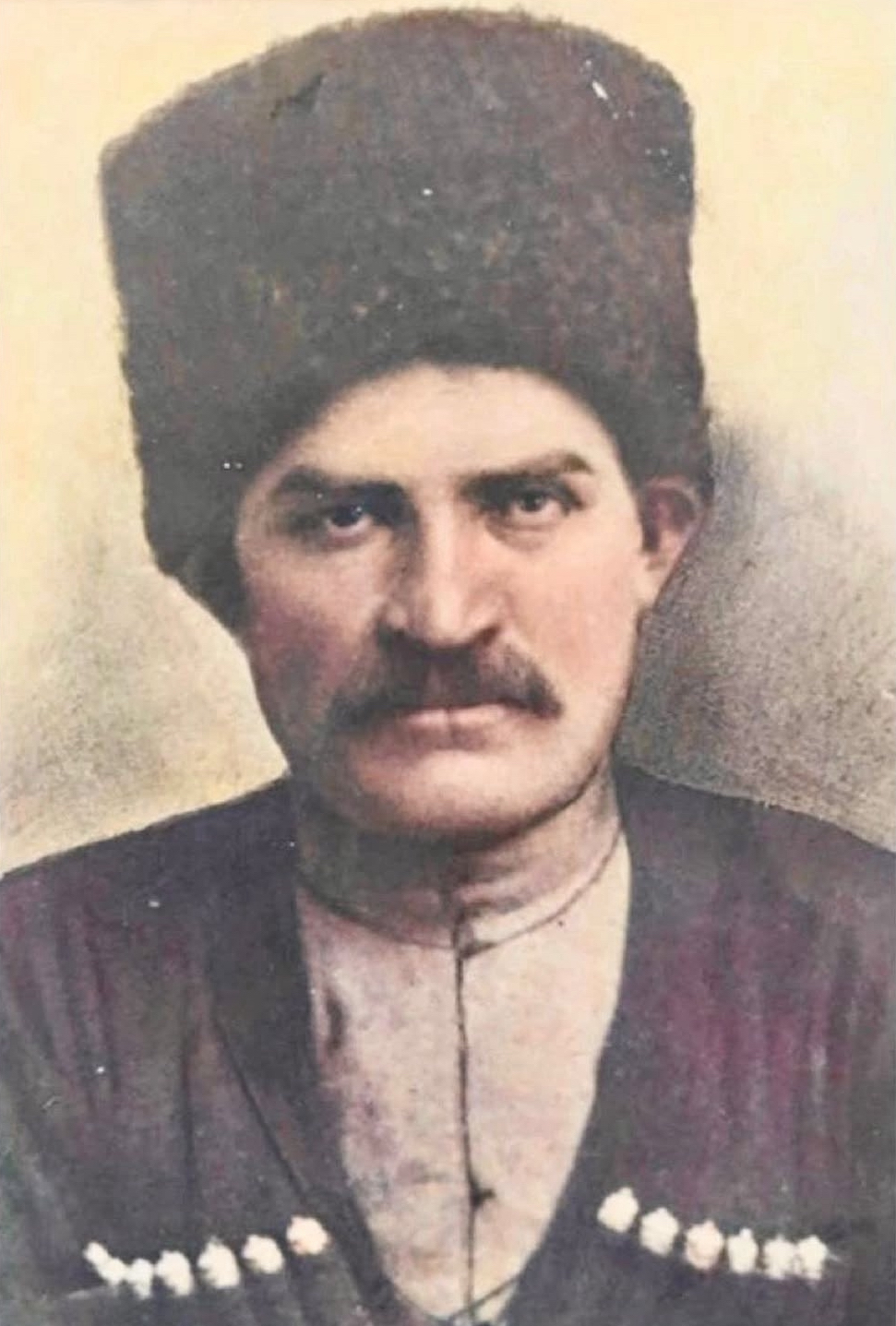
Mirza Tsoraev, leader of the Cherek Uprising (1913)

== Legal Proceedings and Interpretation ==
Initial indictments described the uprising as the result of "economic and social antagonism" between peasants and taubii, and participants faced the possibility of penal servitude. However, by 1915, imperial authorities reclassified the event as a private dispute, minimizing its class-based and revolutionary nature.

Officials like Karaev and Klishbiev later retracted earlier statements, reflecting a shift in state strategy to downplay widespread discontent.

== Legacy ==
The Cherek Uprising, along with the Zolskoye uprising, is remembered as a symbol of anti-feudal and anti-colonial resistance by the Balkar and Kabardians peoples. It exposed the fragility of rural governance and foreshadowed broader unrest leading to the Russian Revolution of 1917.

In 1983, a memorial commemorating the 70th anniversary of the uprising was erected near Kashkhatau.

== See also ==
- Zolskoye Uprising
- Kabardino-Balkaria
- Russian Revolution of 1917
