= Pierre Reichel =

- Citizenship: Switzerland
- Education: University of Lausanne
- Years active: 1993 - ongoing
- Organization: International Committee of the Red Cross
- Known for: humanitarian worker

Pierre Reichel is a Swiss humanitarian and long-time representative of the International Committee of the Red Cross (ICRC). Reichel has worked for the ICRC in various conflict zones for many years. His name is particularly noted in humanitarian circles and archival memoirs for his selfless service in war zones, his moral support for prisoners, and his work in securing the release of prisoners.

== Life and education ==
Due to the principles of security and impartiality, the personal biographical information of representatives and delegates of the International Committee of the Red Cross (ICRC), including Pierre Reichel, such as their exact day, month, year and city of birth, is not officially disclosed to the public. However, information on his LinkedIn page indicates that he received his higher education at the University of Lausanne in Switzerland. His university years spanned the years 1975–1992. He began his humanitarian mission in 1993 as a delegate for the International Committee of the Red Cross and has been working for this organization for more than 30 years.

== Humanitarian activity ==
Pierre Reichel maintains his status as an experienced specialist in the Swiss and international humanitarian system. He has worked for the ICRC for many years in various conflict zones. Reichel has served in some of the world's most hot and difficult conflict zones throughout his career.

=== International Missions ===
- Azerbaijan (1990s): During the First Nagorno-Karabakh War, he was the ICRC representative in Baku and the conflict zones. He delivered letters to the families of Azerbaijani prisoners of war ("Red Cross letters") and led the process of releasing prisoners and returning them to their homeland. For his activities in Azerbaijan, he was called the "Guardian of Prisoners" (Guardian Angel of Prisoners). Thus, he carried out the mission of visiting Azerbaijani prisoners of war and hostages held in Armenian captivity, checking their conditions of detention and helping them to maintain contact with their families. In May 1996, he directly participated in the process of returning Azerbaijani prisoners of war and hostages to Baku, and carried out a mediation mission in accordance with the principles of international humanitarian law.
- North Caucasus: After completing his mission in Azerbaijan, he carried out humanitarian work in the North Caucasus (during the Chechen–Russian conflict and its aftermath) for 8 years.
- Afghanistan (Kandahar and Mazar-i-Sharif): During the tense period of the conflicts, he served as the head of delegation and representative in Kandahar for 1 year and in Mazar-i-Sharif for 2 years.
- Iraq (Erbil and Kirkuk): Participated in humanitarian crisis management missions in Erbil, Iraq for 1 year and then in the Kirkuk region.
- South Ossetia (Tskhinvali): Served as the head of the ICRC's Tskhinvali office for 3 years from around 2012 onwards.

== Memories of Azerbaijani prisoners of the First Karabakh War ==
In a post on Todaypress.tv's Instagram page, it was noted that Pierre Reichel played an important role in the fate of hundreds of Azerbaijanis held in Armenian captivity during the First Karabakh War as a representative of the International Committee of the Red Cross. His risking his life and entering the occupied Shusha prison and working to improve the harsh, unsanitary conditions there was highly appreciated. As a result of Reichel's efforts, cruel guards were removed, and the prisoners were provided with warm clothing, medicine and other necessary assistance. Most importantly, he achieved the official registration of secretly held Azerbaijani prisoners, preventing their disappearance without a trace and secret killings. Pierre Reichel is remembered with great respect in the memory of the people he saved. Reichel's activities are confirmed by eyewitness accounts in the investigative documentary "Shadow of the Cross." In the film, Kazimov, who was captured by the Armenians during the First Karabakh War, notes that Pierre Reichel replaced the entire staff of the Shusha prison, from the governor to the guards. Kazimov maintains contact with him to this day and still keeps his phone number. Continuing his speech, he notes, "If it weren't for him, I might not be here today."
