= Siege of Kizlyar (August 1785) =

1785 military conflict at Kizlyar Fortress

- Part of Sheikh Mansur Movement
Date	20–21 August 1785
Location	Kizlyar fortress, North Caucasus Line, North Caucasia
Result	Sheikh Mansur failed to capture the Kizlyar fortress.

Belligerents
Sheikh Mansur Movement; Chechens; Kabardia; Aksay Kumyks	Russian Empire

Commanders and leaders
Sheikh Mansur; Dol Mudar	(Russian Empire) Ivan Veshnyakov (Russian Empire) Bekovich Cherkassky (Russian Empire) Ivan Lunin (Russian Empire) Peter Sekhin

Units involved
Followers of Mansur; Kumyk raiders Kabardian militias	(Russian Empire) Tomsk Infantry Regiment (Russian Empire) Astrakhan Regiment (Russian Empire) Kizlyar Regiment (Russian Empire) Greben and Terek Cossacks; ~Georgian, Armenian and Kalmyk civilian militias

Strength
10,000–12,000	>3,000 Regulars; Unknown amount of irregulars, Cossacks and civilian fighters

Casualties and losses
200–1,000 killed	~410 killed 876 wounded

The Siege of Kizlyar in August 1785 was the second and final attempt of Chechen forces and Highlander allies led by Sheikh Mansur to capture the Kizlyar fortress.

== History ==
In 1784, in Chechnya, a charismatic village imam, Imam Mansur, began preaching in his sermons that all the peoples of the North Caucasus should unite against Russia. Imam Mansur quickly assembled an army and, during this period, wrote letters to the other peoples of the Caucasus. The Circassians had already been fighting Russia since 1763, and they joined Mansur's army.

During the Siege of Kizlyar in July 1785, Imam Mansur attempted to capture Kizlyar but was unsuccessful. In July 1785, he subsequently attacked the Grigoriopolis Redoubt, however his attack didn't achieve any success. After the defeat in Grigoripolis, the Kumyk people invited Sheikh Mansur to their country. With the support of Kumyk nobles, Mansur launched another attack on Kizlyar on 19 August 1785. During the siege, however, the Russians bribed some of the Kumyk princes, who turned against Mansur. As the latter began withdrawing his forces, he was ambushed by a Russian army, including an infantry regiment from Tomsk, which was coming to help, but Mansur managed to withdraw his forces without suffering many losses.

Following the failed siege, Sheikh Mansur withdrew into Kabardia, where he gathered reinforcements from the Kabardians and other North Caucasian allies. Russian forces under Colonel Larion Nagel pursued him in an attempt to destroy his army before it could recover. On 30 October 1785, the two sides clashed at the Battle of the Malka. Although the Russians managed to repel Mansur's forces, they suffered significant casualties and were forced to withdraw to the fortified town of Tatartup after local forces cut off nearby water sources. A few days later, Mansur pursued the retreating Russians and attacked their position, beginning the Battle of Tatartup.

== See also ==
- Battle of Grigoriopolis
- Battle of the Malka (1785)
- Sheikh Mansur
- Siege of Kizlyar (July 1785)
