= Battle of Grigoriopolis =

1785 battle in North Caucasia

- Part of Sheikh Mansur Movement
Date	29 – 30 July 1785
Location	Grigoriopolis Redoubt, North Caucasus Line, North Caucasia
Result	Russian victory

Belligerents
Sheikh Mansur Movement: Chechens; Greater & Lesser Kabardia; Kumyks; Lezgins; Nogais; Gazikumukhs	Russian Empire

Commanders and leaders
Sheikh Mansur; Dol Mudarov; Berd Khaptsug	(Russian Empire) Friedrich Ludwig von Wrede (Russian Empire) Cornet Pavlov (POW)

Units involved
Unknown	Companies of the Moscow and Selenga Infantry Regiments; Cossacks

Strength
Unknown	~1,000; Including: 100+ Cossacks

Casualties and losses
Unknown	362 killed 174 wounded 59 captured

The Battle of Grigoriopolis, or the siege of Grigoriopolis was a 2 day long siege of the Grigoripolis Redoubt by Sheikh Mansur's forces which ultimately failed and forced the North Caucasians to retreat.

== Grigoriopolis Redoubt ==
“This redoubt (Grigoriopolis) is located on a gentle and treeless slope of the mountain,” one of the contemporaries describes the redoubt, “Near it, on the right and left sides, there are deep hollows. To the rear, a mile away from it, is the top of a mountain covered with forest.”

== History ==
=== Background ===
Mansur was invited by the Kabardian princes to discuss further actions against the Russian Empire. According to the report of Major Zhiltsov, Mansur accepted the invitation and travelled to Kabardia on 26 July 1785. Immediately, Grigoriopolis was reinforced with a battalion of musketeers. Fyodor Apraksin was ordered to go to the Malka River to prevent the Chechens from uniting with the Kabardians. In his report, the major wrote that on 26 July, the prince of Lesser Kabardia Zhembulat rode up to him and reported that "Sheikh Mansur, with his villainous crowd, intends to attack Grigoriopolis in the near future." To more accurately verify this, Zhiltsov immediately sent him to Kabardia. Upon his return, he reported that Prince Dol and Uzden Berd Khaptsug with their subordinates had gone to Mansur and that they were going to take part in Mansur’s campaign against Grigoriopolis.
At the very end of July, Prince Zhembulat came to the fortification for the second time and reported that Mansur and a detachment of Chechens had already entered Little Kabarda and were located in the Dolovaya Mosque, which was located on a hill. Then Mansur went to the house of Prince Dol, and from there he sent a man for princes Kelemet, Kaituk and other rulers, including prince Zhembulat. Upon the arrival of the invitees, Sheikh Mansur began to persuade them to join him.

=== Prelude and preparations ===
Having secured the support of many Kabardian princes, Sheikh Mansur began his march on Grigorioplis. On the morning of 29 July, the troops of Sheikh Mansur began gathering in a forest near the redoubt. Chechen and Kabardian horsemen jumped out of the forest several times with their banners and badges.
As the detachments of mountaineers near the forest continued to accumulate, Lieutenant Colonel Wrede sent a truce to them to ask for what purpose they had gathered. The envoy however was shot at by the mountaineers and forced to retreat. After that, the fortress began taking defensive measures and preparing for the incoming rebel attack. All troops were brought into the fortification and located along the walls. Weak places were filled with food trains, and the gaps and cracks between the carts were filled with boards, logs and other material. State horses and oxen, located in the fortification, were placed in different buildings and in a ditch. Private livestock, having no place in the fortification, were left behind the rampart and placed in the dugouts of the Selenginsky regiment that were not far from the fortification; the doors and windows of these dugouts were hastily boarded up.

=== Battle ===
At about 2 p.m. in the afternoon, the forces of Mansur surrounded the redoubt from all sides and cut off all communication with the fortress through the mountains and on the plain. The rebels intercepted a dispatch to Vladikavkaz, sent with translator Tsygankov, accompanied by seven Cossacks. At a distance of more than a mile from the fortification, the small detachment was surrounded by highlanders, who then opened fire on it. Lieutenant Colonel Wrede immediately sent Cornet Pavlov with several Cossacks to help. Although Pavlov’s team arrived in time to help Tsygankov, they themselves were surrounded and eventually captured.

The army of the mountaineers descended into the ravines surrounding Grigoriopolis and began besieging it, opening fire on the redoubt with their rifles. Sheikh Mansur was visible among the mountaineer army, wearing white clothes.
The fire fight, which began at 2 p.m. in the afternoon, continued until late twilight. The first attack of the rebels ended in a failure of capturing the redoubt. Then, using their successful experience from the Attack on Karginsk, the rebels began burning down barns, stables and other buildings around the fortress that belonged to the Astrakhan infantry regiment. The dense smoke that was created by the fire greatly hampered the aim of the redoubt's artillery. Then, Mansur's soldiers, under the cover of the smoke, began climbing the walls of the fortification. This attack was eventually repelled by the Russian troops, but not without suffering heavy casualties themselves.

The siege lasted for two days, and the whole time, the Russian soldiers remained without water, as all the water was used to extinguish the fire started by the highlanders. Colonel Wrede, the commander of the fortress, was forced to make a foray outside of the fortress. The tide of the battle was dependent on the operation.
Under the command of Colonel Wrede, around 180 Russian soldiers (80 rangers, 100 Cossacks), under the cover of cannon fire, rushed at the highlanders and a fierce battle ensued, as a result of which the mountaineers, were caught by surprise, began retreating, allowing the Russian detachment to reach the river, fill up tubs with it and began retreating back to the fortress before the rebels had time to reorganize and attack again.
Ultimately, the rebels failed to take Grigoriopolis. The same reason as for the failure at Kizlyar: Lack of experience in attacking well-fortified and defended fortifications. When trying to capture fortifications, they acted spontaneously, which often proves inefficient. The rebels also did not fully master the tactics of organized fire combat in open areas. Knowing how to perfectly defend and attack in mountain and forest conditions, in open, flat terrain, the mountaineers were forced to retreat in direct contact with regular troops.

== See also ==
- Siege of Kizlyar (July 1785) – Battle preceding the Battle of Grigoriopolis
- Siege of Kizlyar (August 1785) – Battle succeeding the Battle of Grigoriopolis
