= Attack on Karginsk =

Part of the Sheikh Mansur movement in 1785

Attack on the Karginsky Redoubt
- Part of July 1785 Siege of Kizlyar of the Sheikh Mansur Movement
Date	14th July 1785
Location	Karginsk Redoubt, ~8 kilometers from Kizlyar
Result	North Caucasian victory
Territorial changes	Karginsk Redoubt captured by Mansur's forces

Belligerents
Sheikh Mansur Movement	Russian Empire

Commanders and leaders
Sheikh Mansur	Unknown

Strength
5,000+	~3,500

Casualties and losses
Unknown	~1,172 killed 1,894 wounded 259 captured 4 cannons

The Attack on Karginsk took place on 14 July 1785. Sheikh Mansur attacked Karginsk Redoubt with his army of North Caucasians before advancing on Kizlyar, which ended in a success for the former and his capture and looting of the redoubt. The attack was the first victory of Sheikh Mansur outside of Chechnya.

== History ==
The forces of the highlanders, numbering more than 5,000 people, led by Sheikh Mansur, made their way to Kizlyar to capture and destroy it. On 14 July, the rebels arrived near Karginsk. Mansur's forces approached the Karginsk redoubt, located around 8 kilometers from Kizlyar. Motivated by their victory over Pieri's detachment, the rebels began their attack on the redoubt. Capturing the redoubt only defended by a small garrison turned out to be a difficult task, especially since the garrison was made up of experienced and well trained soldiers. The lack of experience of the North Caucasians in capturing fortresses also played a crucial role. As a result, several attacks by the forces of Mansur were repelled. Sheikh Mansur realized that a direct attack on the redoubt could lead to heavy losses, so he called his commanders into the camp to discuss further actions. The highlanders began gathering everything burnable and built large fires, causing nearby wooden houses to catch fire and burn down. The fire eventually spread to the redoubt walls. The Russian soldiers tried extinguishing the fire with water from a nearby river, but their access to it was cut off by Mansur's troops. A strong wind carried the fire across the redoubt, eventually reaching the powder magazine. The entire fortification, together with most of its defenders, blew up. Following that, the forces of Mansur successfully stormed the bastion and captured the remaining defenders, as well as 4 cannons.

== See also ==
- Sheikh Mansur — Commander of the North Caucasian army, Imam of the North Caucasus
- Battle of Aldy — Battle a few days before the attack on Karginsk
- Siege of Kizlyar (July 1785) — Battle following right after the attack on Karginsk
