= Russo-Caucasian conflict =

Conflict between Russians and Caucasians

- Ethnic map of the Caucasus region from 1995
Date	c. 1550 – ongoing (c. 475 years) (recent phase: 1991 – ongoing)
Location	North Caucasus, spillover in South Caucasus
Status	Ongoing
Territorial changes	Following the conflict with Kumyks, Russia largely withdraws from the Caucasus for nearly 115 years (1560–1607); After the Russo-Circassian War and genocide, Circassians are expelled from the Kuban region, which is resettled by Russians and Cossacks (1763–1878); North Caucasian states are incorporated into Russia as the Terek Oblast after the Caucasian War (1864–1917); North Caucasian independence in the MRNC and NCE (1917–1922); Caucasian AOs (Karachay, Kabardino-Balkaria, Ossetia, Checheno-Ingushetia, Dagestan) are incorporated into the Soviet Union (1922–1936); Caucasian ASSRs (Karachay-Cherkessia, Kabardino-Balkaria, Ossetia, Checheno-Ingushetia, Dagestan) are incorporated into the Russian SFSR (1936–1944; 1957–1991); Provisional government supported by Nazi Germany (1940–1944); Deportations of the Karachays, Baklars, Chechens and Ingush to Central Asia (1943–57); Independence of the Chechen Republic of Ichkeria (1991–2000); Beginning of Insurgency in Dagestan (1999); Russia topples the leadership of Chechnya and Caucasus Emirate (2000–2017)

Belligerents
Caucasian states, militants and allied groups	Russian Federation; (1991–Present)
Including: IS–CP (since 2015); Caucasus Emirate; (2007–2017); Chechen Republic of Ichkeria (since 1991); CMPC (1989–2000); North Caucasus National Committee; (1940–1944); Red Caucasians; (1921–1924); North Caucasian Emirate (1919–1920); Mountain Republic; (1917–1922); Ossetians (1801–1850); Caucasian Imamate; (1828–1859; 1877–1878); Ingushetia; (1817–1858); Dagestan nations; (1800–1859); Chechen tribes; (1791–1840; 1859–1861); Karachay-Balkars; (1787–1834; 1855); Sheikh Mansur; (1785–1791); Abazinia (1778–1864); Kabardia (1763–1825); Circassia; (1711–1864; 1877–1878); Nogais (1569–1783); Shamkhalate of Tarki (1556–1813; 1823; 1831; 1843)	Preceded by: Soviet Union; (1922–1991); Soviet Russia; (1917–1922); (Russia) (Russia) White Movement; (1917–1920); Russian Empire; (1721–1917); Tsardom of Russia (1547–1721)

The Russo-Caucasian conflict is a protracted ethnic and political struggle between various North Caucasian peoples and Russian, Soviet, and Imperial Russian authorities. This conflict dates back to the 16th century, as Russian forces sought to expand southward. Various Caucasian groups, including Abazins, Circassians, Chechens, Ingush, Karachay-Balkars, Ossetians and Dagestanis (various Dagestani nations), resisted Russian control through both armed and diplomatic means. The conflict’s modern phase intensified following the Soviet Union’s collapse in 1991, with separatist aspirations and resistance movements that continued to face suppression into the 21st century.

== Background ==
=== Geopolitical Significance ===
The Caucasus region, bridging Europe and Asia, holds immense geopolitical importance. Its strategic location between the Black and Caspian Seas, coupled with its rugged terrain, has made it both a barrier and a gateway to southern territories. Russia’s desire to control the Caucasus stems from its ambitions to secure borders, control trade routes, and expand influence toward the Middle East.

Topography of the Caucasus

=== Russian-Kumyk Wars and Initial Encounters ===
The origins of the Russo-Caucasian conflict can be traced back to the 16th century, coinciding with the Russian Empire’s expansion into the Caucasus region. The Kumyks, a Turkic people residing in Dagestan, were among the first to mount organized resistance against Russian encroachment, engaging in the Russian-Kumyk Wars throughout the 16th and 17th centuries. Their opposition not only laid the groundwork for broader alliances among various Caucasian groups but also set a precedent for the multi-ethnic resistance movements that would characterize subsequent conflicts.

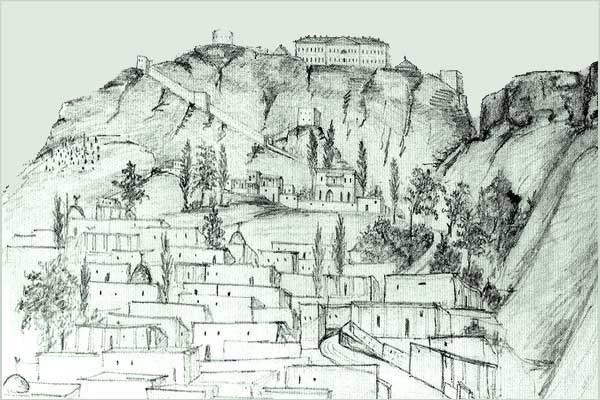
Capital of Tarki

Russian expansion into the Caucasus began under Ivan the Terrible, who initially sought to establish ties with the Kabardians. His marriage to Maria Temryukovna, a Kabardian noblewoman, temporarily aligned Kabardia with Russian interests. However, following her death, the relationship soured, leading the Kabardians, along with the Kumyks and Nogays, to launch raids against Russian forces. This growing resistance culminated in 1571, when Devlet Giray, the Crimean Tatar khan, allied with the Nogays to execute a devastating raid on Moscow, highlighting the challenges faced by Russia in securing its southern frontier.

The conflict began to intensify around 1556, when Russia captured Astrakhan, extending its reach into the North Caucasus and bringing it into direct contact with the Kumyks. This conquest disrupted Kumyk trade routes and further heightened tensions. Throughout the late 16th century, these conflicts continued sporadically, laying the groundwork for the larger Russo-Caucasian conflicts that would unfold in the 18th and 19th centuries. The Kumyks' resistance and collaboration with other local groups foreshadowed the volatility of the region and the protracted conflicts that were to follow, as diverse Caucasian peoples united against Russian expansionist policies.

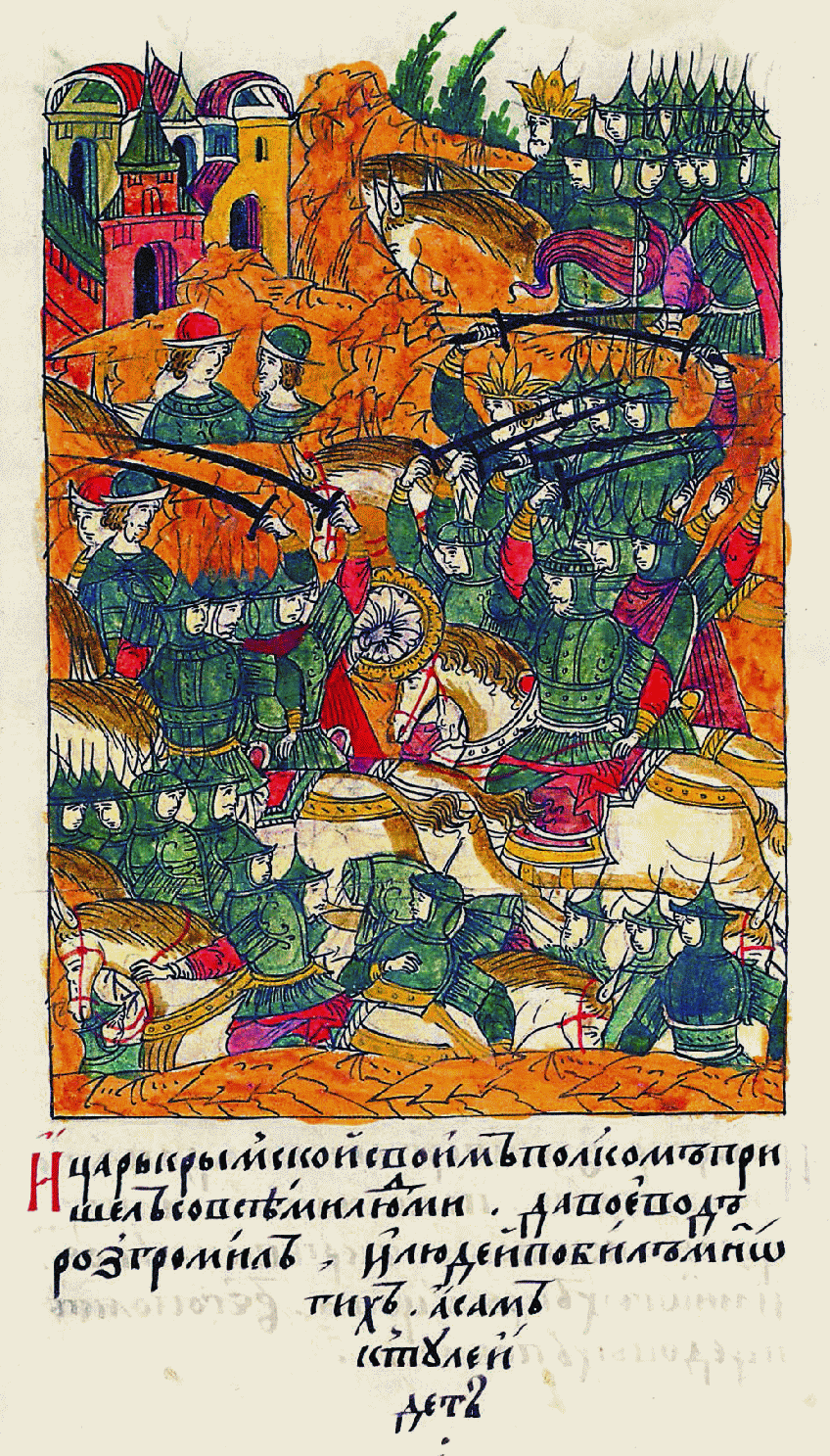
Miniature of the Illustrated Chronicle

The main conflicts began in 1560, when the Russians plundered the capital of the Kumyks, the city of Tarki. Soon, under pressure from the Crimeans, the Russians were forced to retreat. In 1591, the campaign was repeated, as a result of the campaign, the Kumyk tsar was wounded, and Georgia promised to become a Russian citizen. Further attempts at expansion were unsuccessful, in 1594 the Kumyks repelled the campaign, and in 1607 almost completely exterminated the invading forces.

== History ==
=== Early Wars and Peter the Great’s Expansion ===
In the early 18th century, Tsar Peter the Great embarked on a series of campaigns to extend Russia’s reach into the Caucasus, marking the start of consistent Russian interventions in the region. His first significant attempt was in 1711 during the Pruth River Campaign, where Russian forces briefly advanced into Circassian territories. During the campaign, Tatar and Circassian farms suffered greatly. When trying to catch up with the invaders, the Circassians were defeated on the Chany River. The Russians were unable to consolidate their successes and were forced to withdraw troops under Treaty of the Pruth.

A decade later, Peter renewed his focus on the region with the Russo-Persian Campaign (1722–1723), aiming primarily at Dagestan and Azerbaijan. Although Circassia was not the main target of this campaign, it marked a turning point for Russian strategy in the Caucasus and set the stage for future conflicts. By this time, Circassian resistance to Russian expansion along the Black Sea coast had also begun to intensify, foreshadowing the larger Russo-Circassian War that would erupt later in the 18th century. This era of Russian campaigns laid the groundwork for a prolonged struggle over the Caucasus, initiating tensions that would eventually culminate in over a century of conflict.

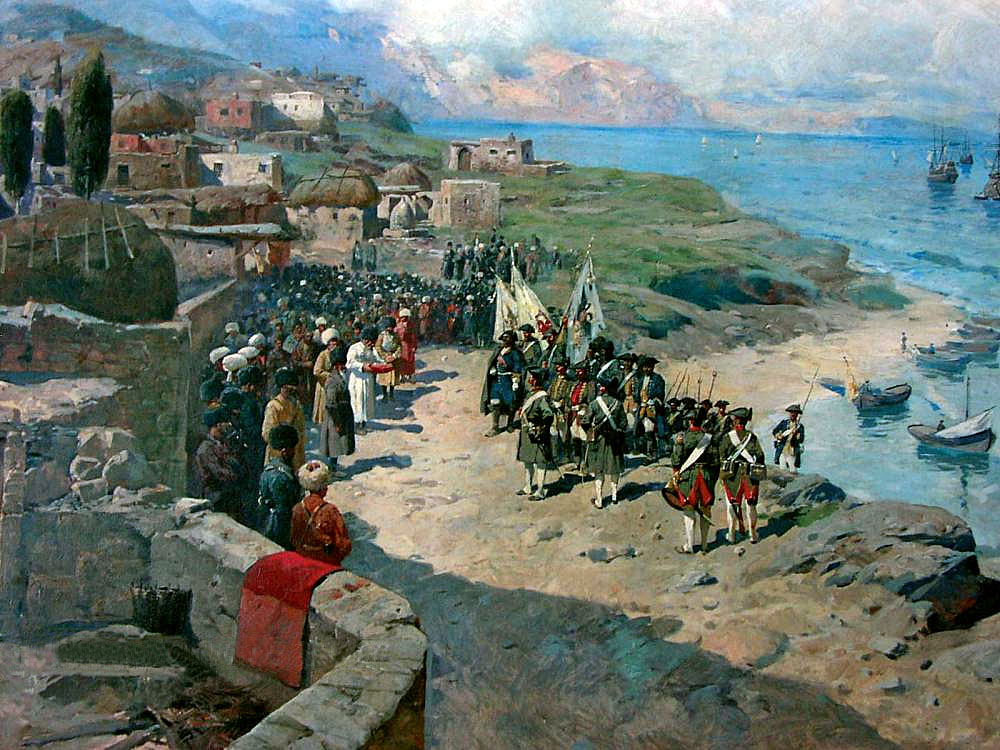
Peter I in Tarki, the capital of Tarki Shamkhalate; by Franz Roubaud

=== Russo-Circassian War (1763–1864) ===
The Russo-Circassian War was a protracted struggle between the Russian Empire and the Circassian people of the North Caucasus, lasting from 1763 to 1864. As part of Russia’s broader campaign to control the Caucasus region, this war saw Circassian resistance characterized by guerrilla tactics and strategic use of mountainous terrain. The Circassians, who received limited support from the Ottoman Empire, fought to preserve their homeland and autonomy. By the war’s end, Russian forces killed and forcibly displaced large portions of the Circassian population, killing and expelling an estimated 1 million to 2 million people to the Ottoman Empire. Many perished from starvation, disease, and harsh travel conditions in what is now widely known as the Circassian Genocide. Georgia’s Parliament formally recognized this genocide in 2011, and Circassian activists continue to seek broader international recognition.

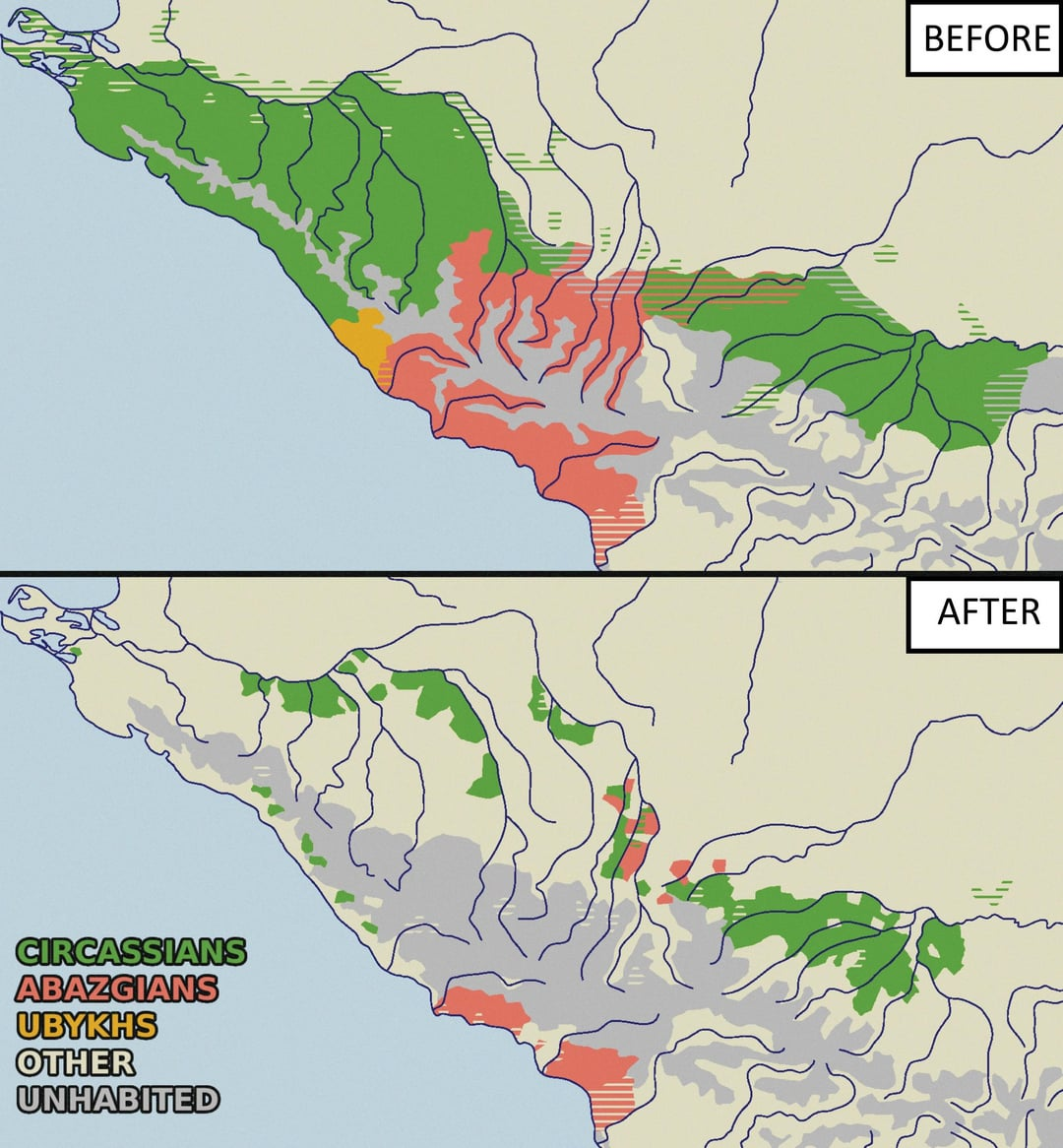
Map of Circassians, Abazgians and Ubykhs before and after the Circassian Genocide

=== Sheikh Mansur’s Movement (1785–1791) ===
In 1785, Sheikh Mansur, a Chechen muslim leader, organized one of the first large-scale North Caucasian resistances against Russian expansion. Inspired by Islamic teachings, Mansur’s vision united fighters across the Caucasus, emphasizing cultural and religious independence. Though ultimately defeated and captured in 1791, Mansur’s movement laid the foundation for later resistance efforts and inspired future leaders. He remains a symbol of defiance against Russian dominance, and his call for a united Caucasian front set the stage for subsequent, religiously motivated resistance.

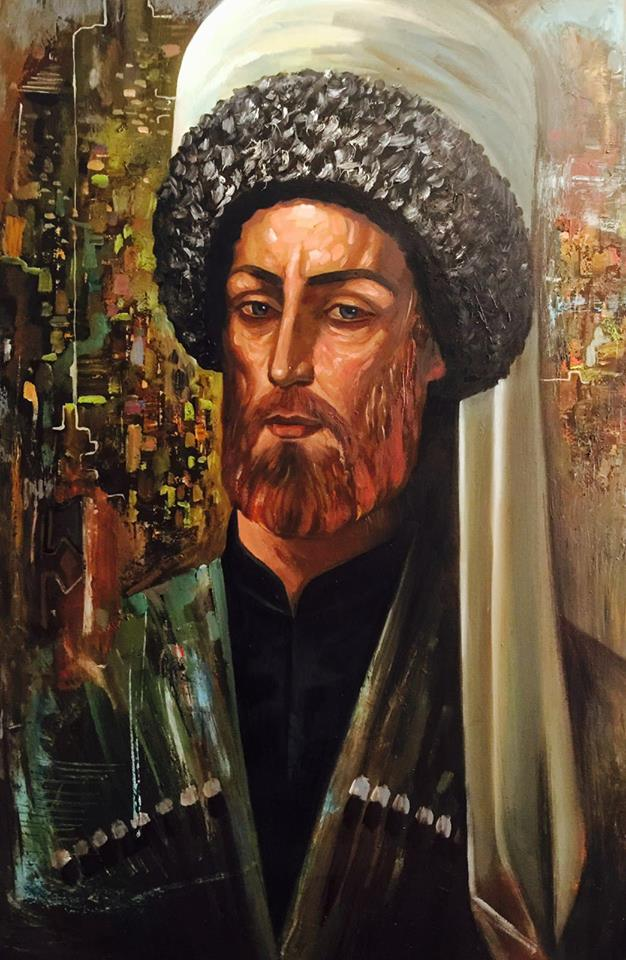
Sheikh Mansur‘s Portrait

=== Caucasian War (1817–1864) and the Imamate of Imam Shamil ===
The Caucasian War (1817–1864) was the bloodiest phase of the broader Russo-Caucasian conflict. Imam Shamil, a Dagestani leader of Avar descent, became a central figure in the North Caucasian resistance when he proclaimed the Caucasian Imamate in 1834, seeking to unify the region’s ethnic and religious groups, including the Chechens, Avars, and Lezgins. Shamil led a powerful guerrilla campaign from the mountainous regions, effectively holding off Russian advances for years until his capture in 1859. While Shamil’s capture marked the end of his Imamate, resistance continued in various forms. Shamil is remembered as a symbol of resilience, embodying the North Caucasian struggle to protect their identity, independence, and way of life against Russian expansionism.

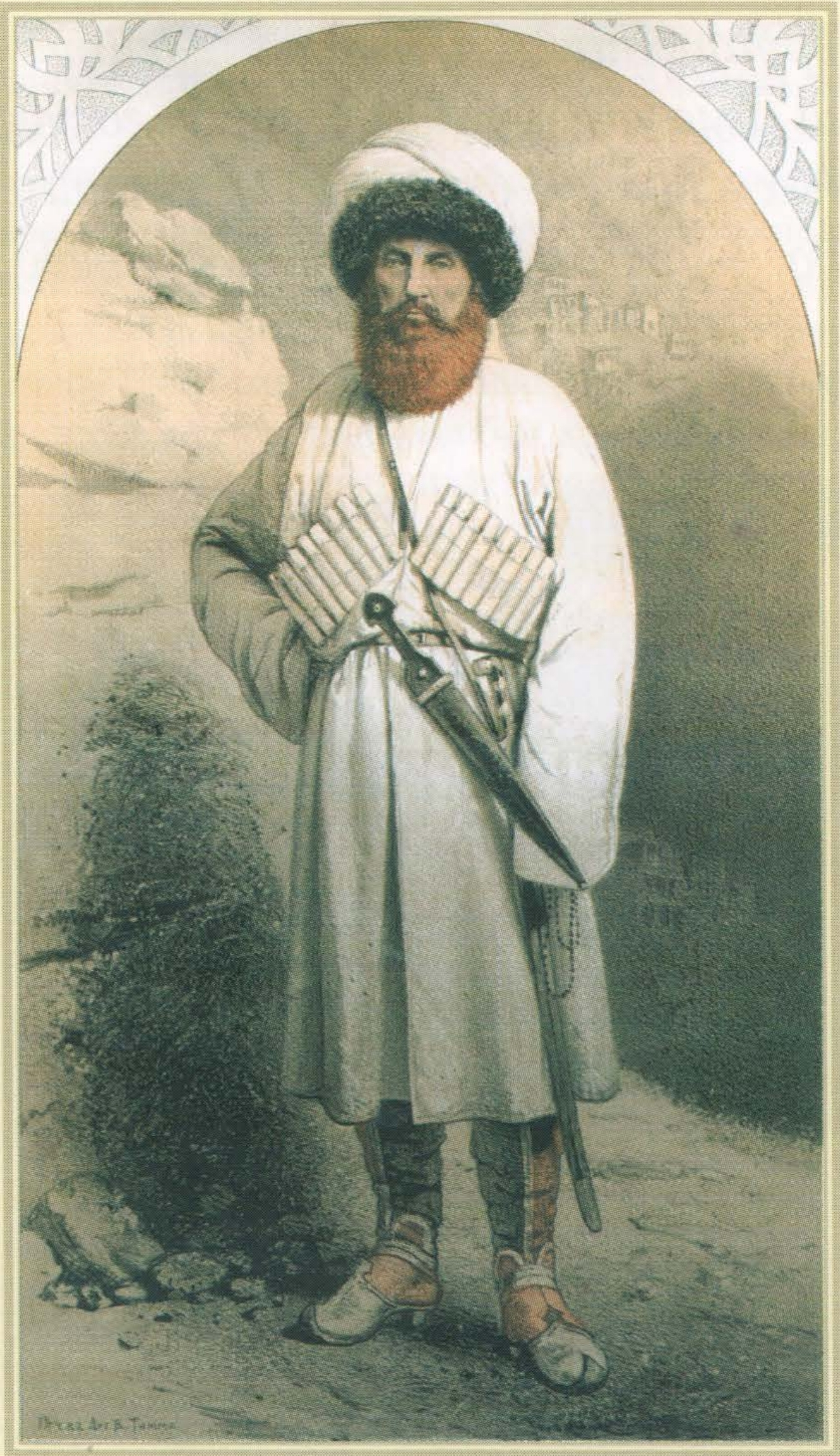
Imam Shamil, Lithography by Vasily Timm

=== Brief Independence Movements (1917–1921) ===
The collapse of the Russian Empire in 1917 after the Bolshevik Revolution provided a brief opportunity for North Caucasian independence. In 1917, the Mountainous Republic of the Northern Caucasus (MRNC) was declared, encompassing regions inhabited by North Caucasian peoples. The North Caucasian Emirate (NCE) followed shortly after, grounded in Islamic governance. However, the newly formed Soviet Union quickly reasserted control, and by 1921, the Red Army had dismantled both republics. Though short-lived, the MRNC and NCE remain symbols of North Caucasian independence aspirations.

Map of MRNC

=== Soviet Era and Deportations ===
During World War II, Soviet leader Joseph Stalin accused the Chechens, Ingush, Karachays, and Balkars of collaborating with Nazi Germany, despite minimal evidence. In 1944, Stalin ordered mass deportations as part of Operation Lentil, forcibly relocating over 500,000 Chechens and Ingush, as well as over 110,000 of Karachays and Balkars, to remote areas in Central Asia. Transport conditions were severe, with an estimated 25–45% mortality rate due to starvation, exposure, and disease. Survivors faced harsh conditions until 1957, when they were allowed to return. These deportations left lasting trauma within North Caucasian communities.

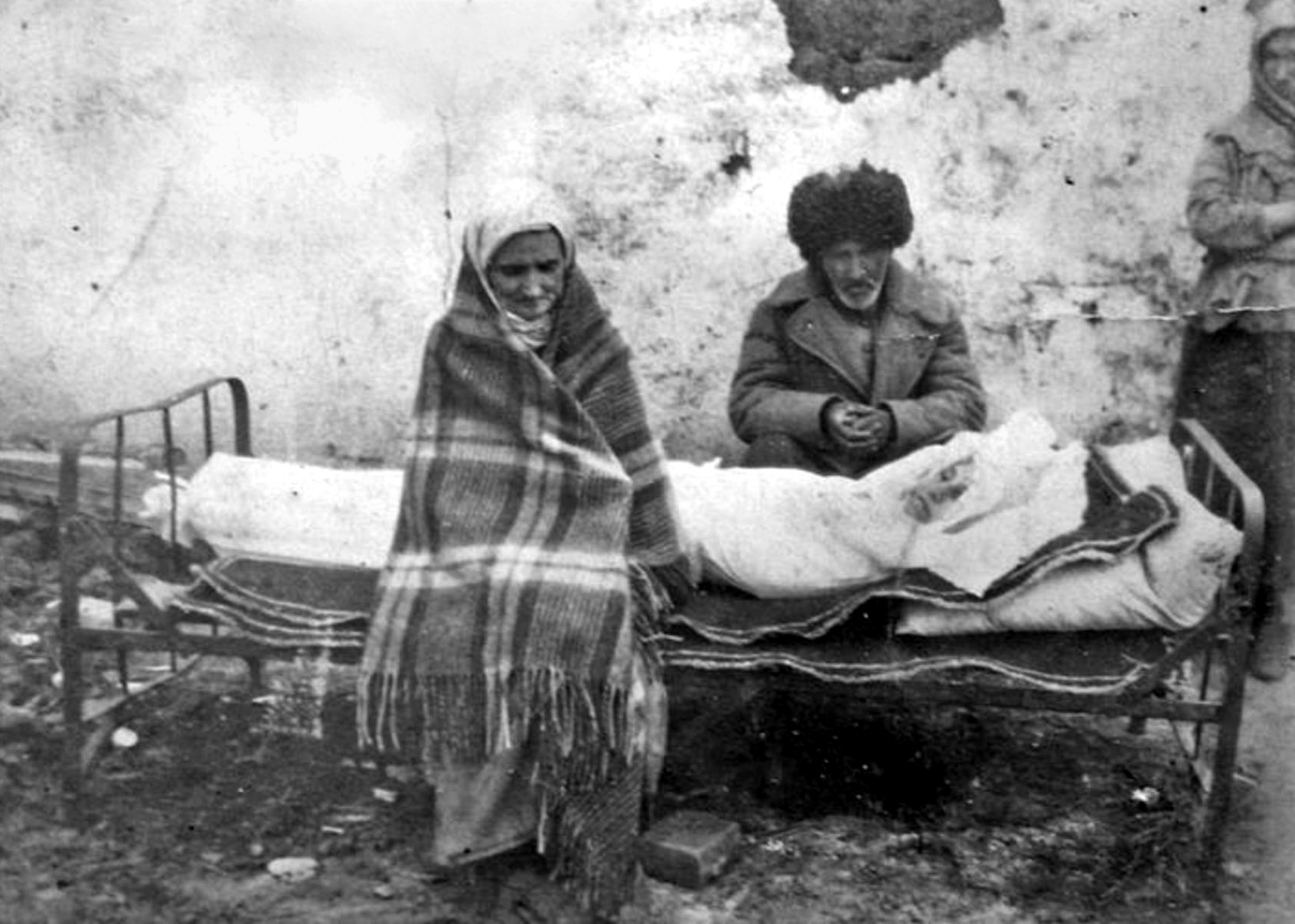
An Ingush family mourning the death of their daughter in Kazakhstan

=== Modern Insurgencies (1990s–Present) ===
Following the dissolution of the Soviet Union in 1991, the North Caucasus saw renewed uprisings, particularly in Chechnya. The First Chechen War (1994–1996) and Second Chechen War (1999–2000) resulted in tens of thousands of deaths and widespread destruction, especially in Chechen cities like Grozny. Concurrently, tensions also escalated in other parts of the region, notably with the 1992 Ossetian-Ingush War, where the Russian government intervened on behalf of the Ossetians, exacerbating ethnic divisions and fueling further conflict. The Chechen conflict sparked a broader Islamist insurgency across the North Caucasus that continues sporadically to this day, with clashes in Dagestan, Ingushetia, and Kabardino-Balkaria underscoring the enduring tensions in the region.

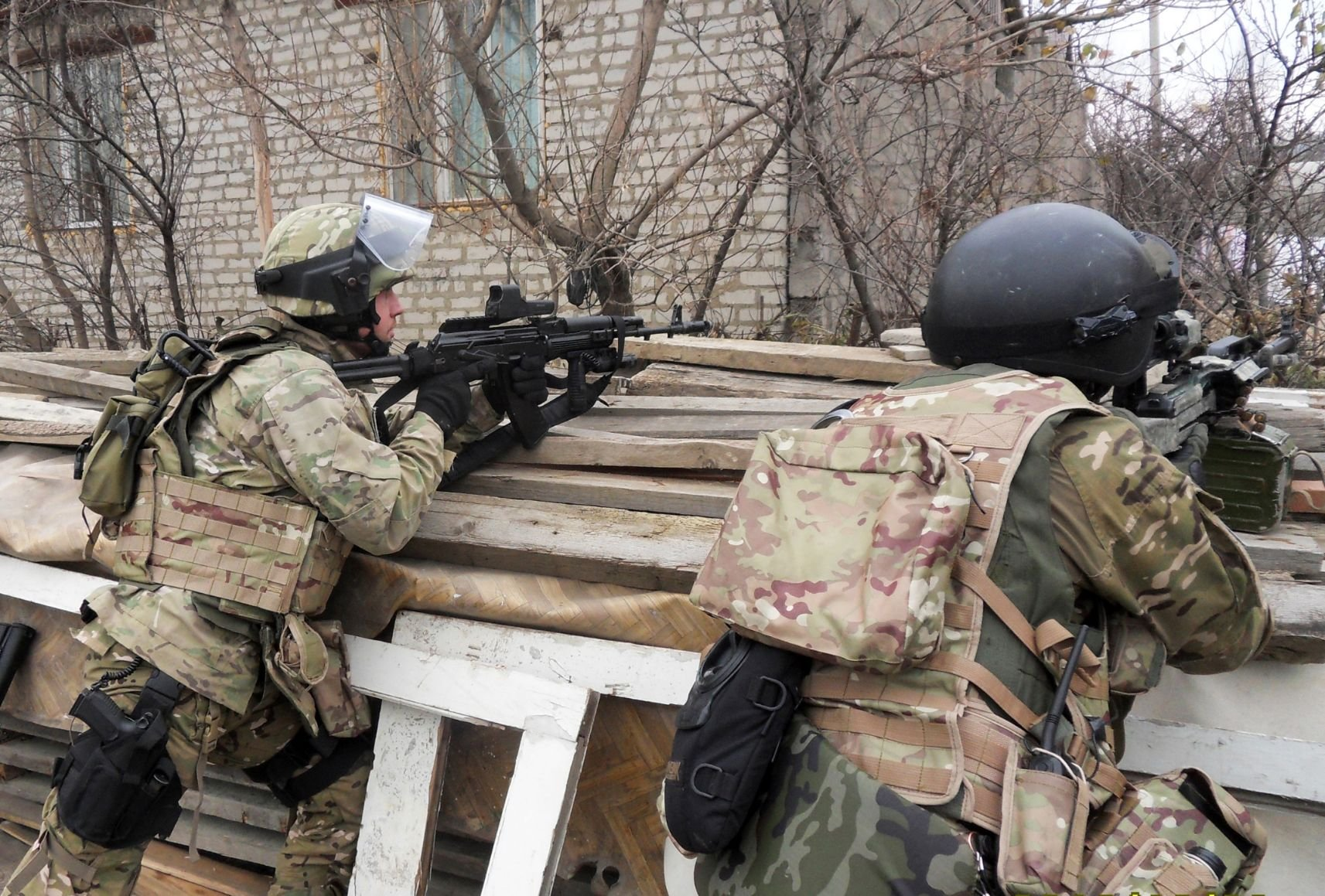
Employees of the FSB of Russia during a special operation in Makhachkala

== Cultural and Social Impacts ==
The Russo-Caucasian Conflict has deeply shaped the culture, society, and identity of North Caucasian communities. Forced migrations, like the Circassian Genocide and Stalin’s deportations, severed populations from their homelands, scattering diaspora communities across the Middle East, Europe, and the Americas. In particular:

• Diaspora and Memory: The North-Caucasian diasporas actively preserve their cultural heritage and have played key roles in advocating for international recognition of historical atrocities, such as the Circassian Genocide.

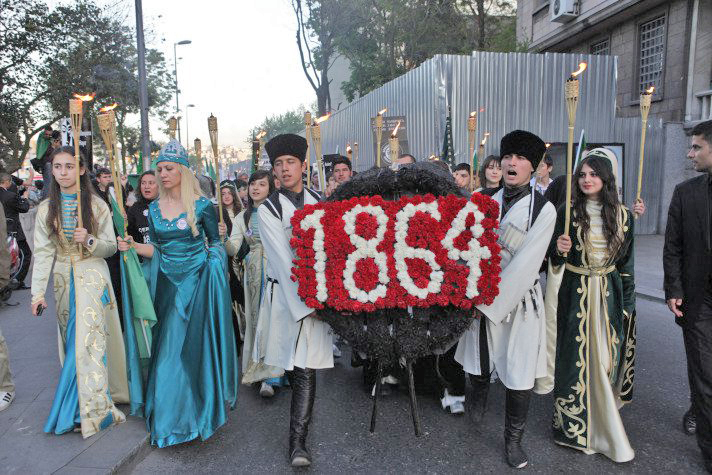
Circassians marching to commemorate the Circassian genocide in Taksim Square, Istanbu

• Traditional Practices: Indigenous languages, customs, and Islamic traditions have been instrumental in preserving North Caucasian identity despite efforts at Russification during both Tsarist and Soviet times.

• Symbolic Resistance: Figures like Imam Shamil and Sheikh Mansur have become cultural icons, representing the spirit of resistance and unity among North Caucasian groups. Annual commemorations of key events, including deportations and genocide, reinforce the collective memory of these historical traumas.

Modern North Caucasian culture reflects a blend of resilience, historical awareness, and ongoing advocacy for autonomy, often in tension with Russian federal policies aimed at integration.

== South Caucasus Situation ==
The South Caucasus comprising present-day Georgia, Armenia, and Azerbaijan has had a unique yet deeply intertwined role in the Russo-Caucasian conflict. Russian ambitions in the South Caucasus added layers of complexity to the prolonged struggle for control of the Caucasus, impacting local cultures, loyalties, and resistance movements. This region saw Russian expansion, local alliances, and complex legacies of forced displacements and conflicts.

=== Russian Expansion, Local Alliances, and Loyalties ===
During the early 19th century, Russian ambitions turned southward, bringing Armenia, Georgia, and Azerbaijan under imperial control as Russia aimed to secure its position between the Ottoman and Persian Empires. Initially, some South Caucasian communities viewed Russia as a protector against Ottoman and Persian dominance, particularly among Christian communities in Armenia and Georgia. This led to a period of loyalty to the Russian Empire, with Georgian and Armenian leaders often collaborating with Russian authorities to maintain regional stability. Over time, however, loyalty shifted as Russia asserted more direct control over the South Caucasus, dissolving local governance structures and limiting autonomy.

Political map of the eastern part of the Southern Caucasus between 1795–1801

=== Resistance, Displacement, and the Deportation of Meskhetian Turks ===
As Russian policies intensified, local resistance grew, particularly as the empire’s control restricted traditional forms of self-governance. In Azerbaijan, local khanates initially resisted Russian encroachment but were ultimately annexed and incorporated into the empire. Tensions were further strained by Russian-led population movements that disrupted regional demographics. In 1944, under Stalin’s orders, the Meskhetian Turks, a Muslim minority, were forcibly deported from Georgia to Central Asia due to alleged security concerns. Thousands suffered from harsh conditions, and the deportation left lasting divisions and grievances within the region.

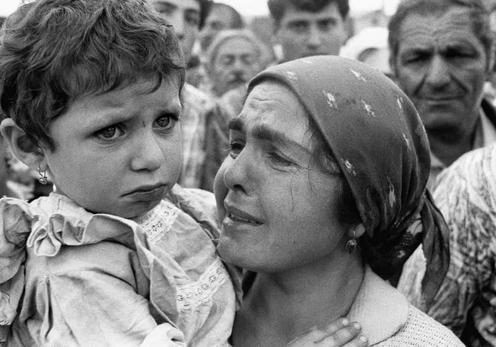
A deported Meskhetian Turk woman and her child in exile in Uzbek SSR

=== Conflicts in Abkhazia and South Ossetia ===
Russian influence in the South Caucasus left a legacy of ethnic tensions, particularly in Abkhazia and South Ossetia. These regions sought independence from Georgia following the dissolution of the Soviet Union, leading to the Abkhaz-Georgian and Ossetian-Georgian conflicts in the early 1990s. Russia’s involvement in these conflicts including direct support for separatist movements further destabilized the region and contributed to the fragmentation of Georgian territory. The 2008 Russo-Georgian War exacerbated these divisions, with Russia formally recognizing Abkhazia and South Ossetia as independent states, a move that has since strained Georgian-Russian relations and maintained high levels of regional tension.

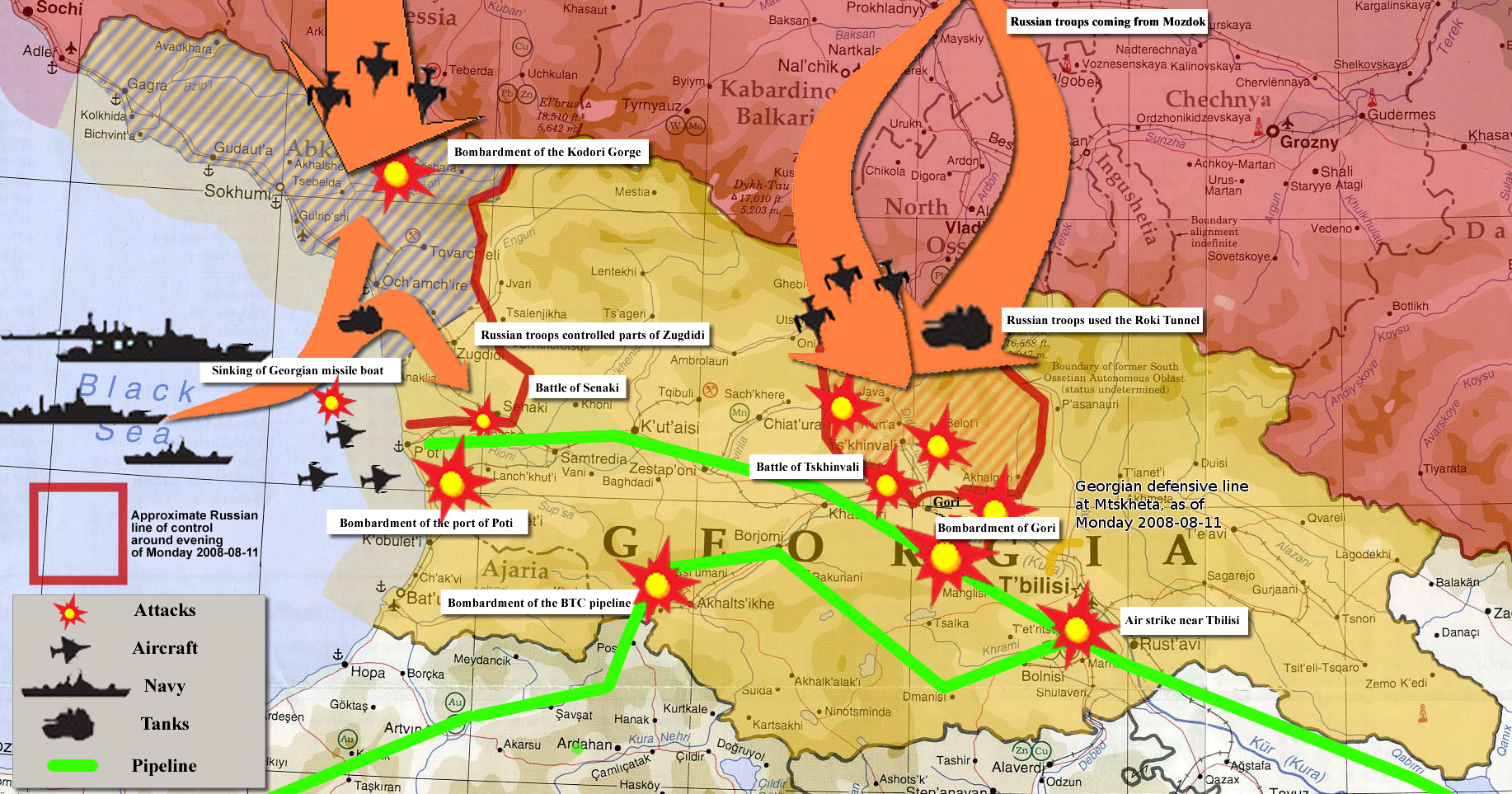
Map of Georgia War in 2008

=== Armenian Conflicts and Russian Alignment ===
In Armenia, Russian influence reshaped both local governance and national identity, with Armenian communities often aligning with Russia for protection against neighboring powers. However, Armenia’s ties to Russia have also drawn it into complex regional politics, notably in its longstanding conflict with Azerbaijan over Nagorno-Karabakh. Russian involvement has been pivotal, both as a mediator and as an ally to Armenia, reflecting a broader pattern of Russia’s strategic balancing in the South Caucasus.

Map of 2020 Nagorno-Karabakh War

=== Legacy and Modern Impacts ===
Russia’s control over the South Caucasus left enduring legacies of cultural shifts, forced displacements, and political instability. The region remains geopolitically significant, with Russian influence still prominent. The forced resettlements and deportations, such as those of the Meskhetian Turks, and the legacy of Russian support for Abkhaz and Ossetian separatism, have fueled ongoing regional divides and mistrust. Today, Russia’s role in the South Caucasus continues to shape the region’s security dynamics, with long-standing ethnic and political divisions rooted in centuries of imperial ambition and complex alliances. This legacy underscores the continued relevance of the Russo-Caucasian conflict and the struggle for autonomy and stability in the Caucasus.

== Current Situation ==
Today, the Russo-Caucasian Conflict manifests in complex social, political, and economic dimensions, with the North Caucasus region under ongoing Russian control. Many North Caucasians perceive this as a continuation of historical occupation, as the Russian government maintains a significant military and security presence in the area, often justifying it under the pretext of counter-terrorism. This has fostered a climate of tension, where Russian authorities are seen as enforcing policies that limit local autonomy and cultural expression. Additionally, frequent clashes between Caucasian residents and Russian security forces underscore persistent regional discontent.

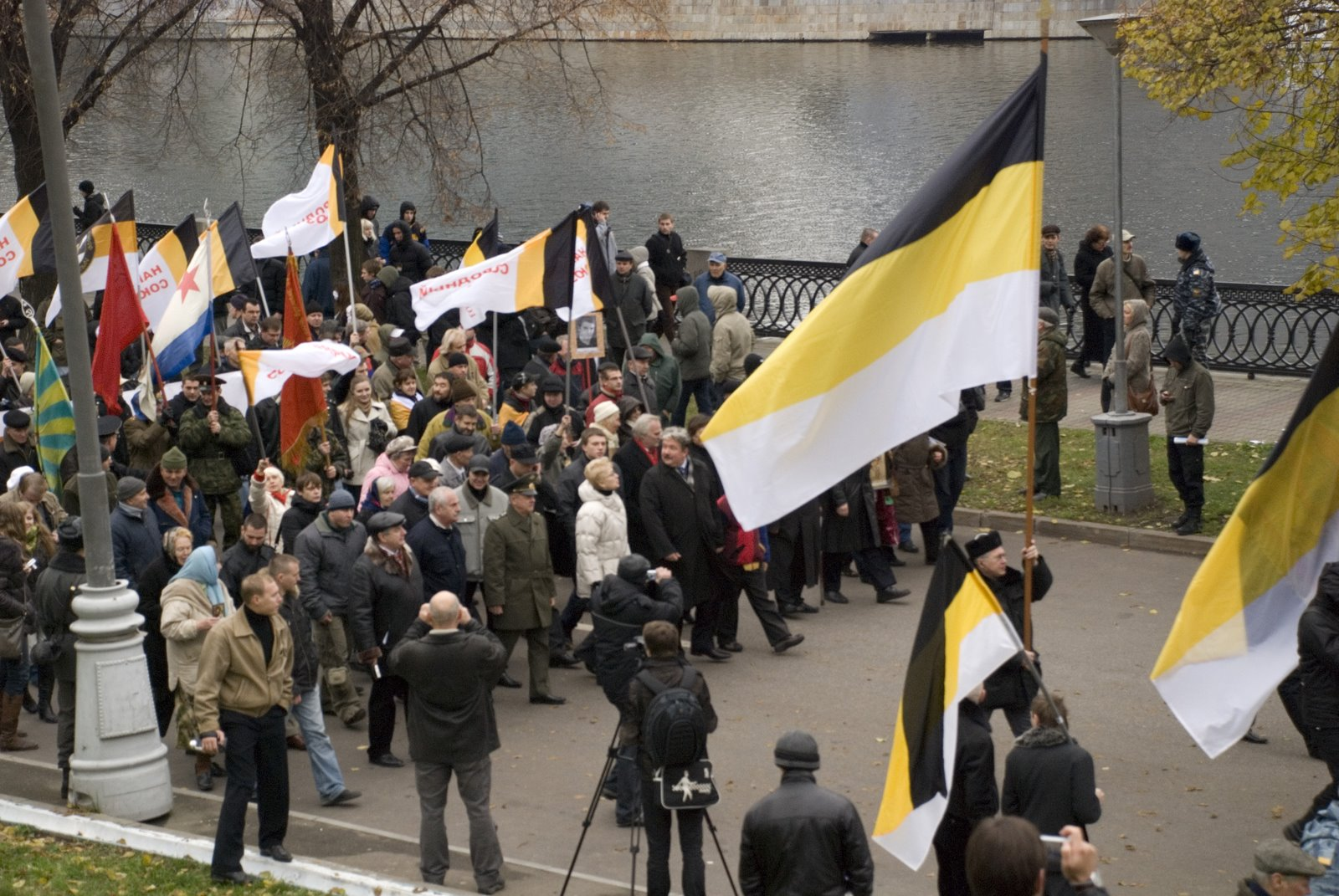
Demonstration of the Russian nationalists in Moscow

In Russian society, discrimination and xenophobia against Caucasians have intensified. Common slogans like „stop feeding Caucasians“, “Russia for Russians” and “Moscow for Muscovites” reflect a segment of public opinion that resists the presence of Caucasians in major cities and other parts of Russia. Government policies and nationalist rhetoric have at times fueled these sentiments, reinforcing stereotypes and marginalizing North Caucasians within Russian society. Caucasians in Russia face routine discrimination and racial profiling in areas such as employment, housing, and law enforcement. Caucasian communities in urban centers often experience disproportionate scrutiny from police, and media portrayals can sometimes further stigmatize these groups.

Survey by Levada Center in which participants are asked if they agree with the phrase "Russia for Russians."

Clashes between ethnic Russians and North Caucasians frequently arise, both in urban settings and in the Caucasus region itself. These confrontations, fueled by underlying ethnic and social tensions, contribute to a cycle of distrust and resentment on both sides. Despite the formal integration of the North Caucasus into the Russian Federation, the region remains economically underdeveloped and socially volatile, with a high unemployment rate and limited access to resources compared to other parts of Russia.

== Modern Recognition ==
The legacy of the Russo-Caucasian Conflict has prompted varying degrees of recognition and awareness in contemporary discourse, particularly regarding historical injustices faced by indigenous groups in the Caucasus. In recent years, there has been a growing acknowledgment of the atrocities committed during the conflicts, including the Circassian Genocide, as well as the widespread deportations of various ethnic groups.

=== Circassian Genocide ===
In 2011, the Parliament of Georgia formally recognized the Circassian Genocide, which occurred during the Russo-Circassian War (1763–1864) and resulted in the deaths and forced displacement of hundreds of thousands of Circassians. This recognition has been part of a broader movement among Circassian activists and diaspora communities who advocate for international acknowledgment of the genocide and seek reparations and the right of return for displaced Circassians. Various other countries, including Turkey and the United States, have seen similar discussions about recognizing the historical injustices faced by the Circassian people.

=== Soviet Deportations ===
The deportations of Chechens, Ingush, Karachays, and Balkars during World War II under Stalin’s regime are also increasingly recognized as acts of genocide by various scholars and human rights organizations. The European Parliament acknowledged the deportation of Chechens as a genocidal act in 2004, emphasizing the need for remembrance and acknowledgment of these historical traumas.

=== Contemporary Impact ===
Modern recognition of these historical events has influenced current discussions on human rights, autonomy, and the rights of indigenous peoples in the North Caucasus. In Russia, however, governmental narratives often downplay or deny the historical grievances associated with the Russo-Caucasian Conflict, reflecting ongoing tensions between the Russian state and the various ethnic groups in the region. Activists continue to push for broader recognition of their rights, cultural heritage, and historical injustices, highlighting the complex interplay between history, identity, and politics in contemporary Caucasian society.

== Sources ==
- Potto, Vasily (1887). "Петровские походы" [Peter's campaign]. Кавказская война [Caucasian war] (in Russian). Vol. I: From ancient times to Ermolov. Типография Евдокимовой.
- Egorshina, O.; Petrova, A. (2023). История русской армии [The history of the Russian Army] (in Russian). Moscow: Edition of the Russian Imperial Library. ISBN 978-5-699-42397-2.

== See also ==
- Russian conquest of the Caucasus
- Russian Civil War
- Deportation of the Meskhetian Turks
- Chechen–Russian conflict
- War in Dagstan
- War in Ingushetia
- War in Kabardino-Balkaria
- Insurgency in the North Caucasus
- Georgian Civil War
- Nagorno-Karabakh conflict
- Islamic State insurgency in the North Caucasus
