= Siege of Kizlyar (July 1785) =

1785 military conflict at Kizlyar Fortress

- Part of Sheikh Mansur Movement
Date	14 – 18 July 1785
Location	Kizlyar fortress, North Caucasus Line, North Caucasia (Modern–day Kizlyar, Republic of Dagestan, Russian Federation) 43°51′N 46°43′E
Result	Inconclusive; Strategic North Caucasian victory; Large booty captured; Karginsk redoubt captured; Tactical Russian victory

Belligerents
Sheikh Mansur Movement: Chechnya; Greater & Lesser Kabardia; Kumyks; Avars; Nogais; Laks; Lezgins; Other Dagestanis	Russian Empire

Commanders and leaders
Sheikh Mansur; Dol Mudarov	(Russian Empire) Ivan Veshnyakov

Strength
5,000+	4,700+

Casualties and losses
Unknown	912 killed 1,174 wounded 4 cannons

The Siege of Kizlyar (July 1785) was the second major confrontation between the Russian Empire and the forces of Sheikh Mansur. The North Caucasians hoped to capture the fortress of Kizlyar, which was the Russian economic center of the North Caucasus. Despite fierce fighting, they failed due to the fortress's strong fortifications and defense. After retreating, the Russian command dispatched the Tomsk infantry to attack the rebels both to demonstrate strength and repel them from Kizlyar, but the regiment was forced to retreat with heavy losses, resulting in the four-day-long Siege of Kizlyar with neither side winning a decisive victory.

== Kizlyar fortress ==
A description of the Kizlyar fortress by German traveler Johann Anton Güldenstädt:

“The city and fortress of Kizlyar lies nine miles below Borozdinskaya on the left bank of the Terek, where it continues its course, having the Borozda River on its left side. The Terek near Kizlyar is now very shallow; especially in spring and autumn, the flow of water in it is almost imperceptible. Kizlyar stands on a low, clayey and swampy bank, which is not only dirty during snowmelt and rainy weather, but also prone to flooding; that’s why they tried to help with this by building dams, which they diligently monitor during water flows. When the East and South winds blow from the mountains in Kizlyar and throughout the Terek, they cause dryness and cold. Near Kizlyar and beyond, the wet and swampy soil and many standing waters often fill the air with thick and stinking fumes.

The city is divided into 4 parts:
The Fortress. It lies on the left bank of the Terek, almost at the source of the Kizlyarka, and does not have any buildings around it. It contains public buildings and garrison barracks.

Soldiers' settlement near Terek, several hundred steps above the fortress. The actual so–called city. It lies on the left bank between the confluence of the Kizlyarka and the old Terek. It contains the houses of the various peoples with whom the city is inhabited, and the city is divided into 8 quarters.

The Armenian quarter, which the Russians call the Armenian settlement, and the Tatars call Armentir.
Georgian quarter, in Russian Gruzinskaya Sloboda, and in Tatar Kurtse–Aul.
The quarter of the newly baptized or proselites, in Tatar Kristiaul, that is, a Christian village. It consists of Nogai and Kumyk Tatars, as well as Circassians, who in former times accepted the Christian faith, of which there are quite a few today. Quarter of the Terek Cossacks. Both these and the newly baptized make up the Terek army. They received their name from the former Terks; the current ones are all baptized and come from either Tatars or Circassians.
Okochirsky quarter. Residents of the Kumyk village of Okochir moved to Kizlyar and settled there. Nowadays it is inhabited by Kumyks and Nogais, who have preserved the Mohammedan law.
Circassian quarter, in Tatar Cherges–aul. It is inhabited by Circassians of Mohammedan law, who for the most part were subjects of Prince Bekevich.
Quarter of the Kazan Tatars, in Tatar Kazante-aul. They moved here from Kazan, practice farming and receive a per capita salary, which none of the other residents of the Terek pay.
Tezik-aul quarter. Persians live in it, whom the Russians call thesesirs from the Persian “tudshir”, that is, merchant. They bargain with Armenians and Georgians, do not pay taxes and do not perform military service. All these quarters are surrounded on the field side by an earthen rampart.

The fourth part of the city lies northwest of Kizlyarka, in a wide plain; it is separated from the entire city, which is why the Tatars call it Kirda-Yuler, that is, a field building. It contains vineyards and vegetable gardens of the inhabitants, where many Georgians and Armenians live.

Due to the lack of forests, a small number of houses were built according to the Russian model from logs, but for the most part from raw and burnt bricks. Most of the houses are mud huts, built from thin poles and cut straw mixed with clay, from which the roof is made. They are quite low inside. Since both the soil and the coating of houses soften and become covered with salt in wet weather, the dwellings throughout the Terek, built in the above-mentioned manner, are neither strong nor healthy. The wood rots very quickly, and the bricks, diluted with salt, become so loose that they rub in the fingers.

== Background ==
Throughout the summer of 1785, there was an intensive accumulation of troops in the Mansur camp, who were motivated by the Chechen victory at Aldy. In his letters and proclamations to various mountain peoples, the imam called on them to unanimously stand with him against the common enemy - the Russian troops and the local princes allied with them. These calls found a response among the Kabardians and Dagestanis, who were ready to join the rebels at any time, not to mention the imam's compatriots, the majority of whom went over to his side. Many mountaineers personally came to Aldy to listen to the imam's sermons. In one of the speeches he held, he said:

“Proud sons of the Caucasus!

For hundreds of years, our ancestors defended their lands from uninvited guests who tried to enslave us by force. Tens of thousands of conquerors laid down their heads here. But this did not become a lesson for those who today want to conquer our region. The riches of the Caucasus haunt our enemies. We have to constantly defend ourselves. The enemies destroy our homes, burn crops, kill the elderly, women and children. They build fortresses on our land, cut down our forests to make it easier for them to attack us, raise pigs, not caring about our laws and customs. They want to drive us into the mountains so that we will die of hunger.

But Allah heard our prayers. Brave Chechens, Kabardians, Avars, Kumyks and our other brothers are ready to stand together against a common enemy. We must destroy all enemy fortresses — Kizlyar, Vladikavkaz, Mozdok and others. If we do not destroy them, the enemy will build similar ones here on our land. And then we will say goodbye to our freedom, forget about our pride. Our ancestors, who defended their fatherland from the enemy at the cost of their lives, will not forgive us for this, our descendants will not forgive us for this, and finally, the great Allah will not forgive us for this. Today our goal is Kizlyar. By destroying it, we will break the first link in the black chain of slavery strangling our native Caucasus. This is not just a war, but a Gazavat. (Note: Meaning Holy War) Everyone who gives his life in this holy war will be blessed and become a martyr. The battle will not be easy, but we are inspired by the fact that we are fighting for a just cause. This means that the Lord himself is with us. Real men are known on the battlefield. Therefore, do not be afraid of the enemy, do not retreat back! May the Almighty help us drive out the disbelievers from our land!”

Unrest increasingly spread across Chechnya, Kabarda and Dagestan. New volunteers joined Mansur's army, and more princes and other rulers expressed a desire to join his campaign against Kizlyar. Of all the fortifications of the Caucasian line, Kizlyar had the greatest strategic importance and was a connecting link between the North Caucasus, Transcaucasia and Russia. Kizlyar was the primary administrative and economic center of the North Caucasus.
By taking Kizlyar, the imam hoped to break the connection between the North Caucasus and Astrakhan, thereby blocking the main road between Russia and the Caucasus.

== Attack on Karginsk (Prelude) ==
On July 14th, Mansur's forces advanced towards the Karginsk redoubt, located 8 kilometers from Kizlyar. The first few attacks by the highlanders were repelled, after which they started several large fires, eventually reaching the powder magazine and subsequently blowing up the entire redoubt, together with its defenders. Mansur's fighters stormed the redoubt soon after, and captured the remaining Russian soldiers, as well as four cannons. This was the first victory of Mansur outside Chechnya.

== Siege ==
=== Advance towards the fortress ===
Motivated by their success, the rebels advanced towards the fortress on July 15. Meanwhile, in the fortress, panic broke out among the population. One of the eyewitnesses describes the scene:

“The picture is of a very sad nature. Frightened children screamed, women cried and, losing their heads, did not know what to do. Gray-haired old men looked gloomily at their families, removed and hid their belongings. Many, not believing in the possibility of holding the city, fled to the Astrakhan steppes...”

In the evening of the same day, the Cossacks were sent to meet the North Caucasian army.
The night passed, but the next day, people began yelling “They are coming!”, and the fortress fell into panic again. To encourage the people, Russian and Armenian priests walked the streets, sang prayers and sprinkled holy water on the Christians and the walls of the fortress. Soldiers began preparing for the coming battle and stood on the fortress walls.
At noon, the rebel forces began crossing the Terek River, where they were met by Cossack fighters, who suffered heavy casualties attempting to stop their advance. By evening, Mansur's forces had crossed the river and they moved to storm the fortress fence.

=== Main battle ===
==== Siege of Kizlyar ====
In total, Mansur's forces conducted five major attacks on the fortress, but each time they were repelled by the cannon and rifle fire coming from the fortress. The fifth attack was the most brutal one, and it seemed that the tide of the battle had gone over to Mansur. At some places, the attackers even managed to climb the fortress walls. The Russian side threw its last reserves at the slowly approaching highlanders, with even civilians picking up arms to fight them.
The fierce fight lasted for more than an hour, and with the onset of night the Russians finally managed to repel the attack, and Mansur's army retreated to their camps.

==== Battle with the Tomsk Regiment ====
Early next morning, the Russian side planned an attack on the rebel camp with the Tomsk infantry regiment — The only unit that was capable of fighting after the fierce battle the day before. The attack was mainly psychological — It was supposed to demonstrate to the rebels the ability of the Kizlyar army to take active actions. The regiment was also tasked with pushing Mansur's army away from the fortress. Lining up in a square, and, accompanied with the beating of drums, the regiment left the fortress walls and advanced towards the rebel camp.
Having realized that he would no longer be able to capture Kizlyar, Mansur focused all of his remaining strength to defeat the Tomsk infantry regiment. The attack of Mansur's troops was carried out from 4 sides at the same time and was so successful that the regiment, having suffered heavy losses, were forced to retreat back into the fortress. During the retreat, the soldiers kept their formations, which is the main reason why the entire regiment wasn't completely destroyed.

On the next day, July 18th, Mansur ordered his troops to stop their assaults and Kizlyar and move away from the fortress. He realized that his army wasn't capable yet of storming well–fortified and defended fortresses, and that further assaults on Kizlyar could lead to heavy losses, which he couldn't allow. After leaving Kizlyar, he allowed his troops to return to their homes to rest and replenish, while he returned to his native village Aldy.

== Aftermath ==
Mansur gave a speech afterwards, in which he congratulated his army on the capture of Karginsk and the defeat of the Tomsk infantry regiment, but also motivated them to keep fighting.

“Dear compatriots! Free sons of the Caucasus!

We proved to the enemies that they will not have a quiet life on our land. The enemy realized that we would repay him in kind for the raids on our villages. We did not hide our raid on Kizlyar from the enemy. They did not go to the fortress like robbers, under the cover of darkness. We failed to take the city — apparently, it was the will of the Almighty. And yet our campaign was not in vain. The enemy is stunned by our actions. With the help of Almighty Allah and thanks to you, courageous sons of the mountains, we were able to destroy significant enemy forces and blow up the Karginsky redoubt along with its defenders. I congratulate you on this success. Now our enemies will no longer be able to plunder our villages with impunity. The people woke up, they realized that the fate of the fatherland is in their hands.

We did not storm Kizlyar. You cannot fight against cannons and rifles with pikes and daggers. But you can’t lose heart because of one failure. The time will come when not only Kizlyar, but also all other fortresses will submit to us. Our task is to raise all the Caucasian peoples to fight the invaders. We have lit only the spark from which the fire should flare up. Only by uniting will the peoples of the Caucasus be able to protect their lands. May God help us become brothers and find a common language with everyone who comes to us with goodness and not with war. Remember, everything is in the hands of the Almighty! Believe in him! Pray to him! Give alms to everyone in need! Your wealth will not decrease from this, but will only increase. Be diligent in faith, follow the law, cleanse your souls from filth. Know that everything you have done in this world, good and bad, will be remembered to you on the Day of Judgment.”

Mansur's speech had effect; Almost none of his supporters perceived the retreat from Kizlyar as a defeat.

The retreat from Kizlyar did also not hinder the movement from spreading across the region. Many people continued leaving their rulers and princes to join the army of Sheikh Mansur. The princes of Endirey wrote in a letter to Kizlyar commander Veshnyakov:

“The people have abandoned our obedience: they have an intention to drive us out of the village,...”

At a meeting held by the people of Endirey, it was decided that if there was any traitor among them who revealed the plans of Sheikh Mansur to the Russian authorities, then “Kill such a person and plunder and burn the house with his estate”.

As for the failure of the mountaineers to take Kizlyar was the lack of special equipment, weapons, and, most importantly, experience.

== See also ==
- Sheikh Mansur — Commander of the North Caucasian army, Imam of the North Caucasus
- Battle of Aldy — Failed Russian expedition to capture Mansur a few days before the Siege of Kizlyar
- Attack on Karginsk — Battle just before the Siege of Kizlyar
- Battle of Grigoriopolis — Next major battle after the Siege of Kizylyar
- Siege of Kizlyar (August 1785) — Second Campaign of Mansur against Kizlyar
