= Battle of Tatartup =

1785 conflict at Tatartup Fortress

- Part of Sheikh Mansur Movement
Date	2 November 1785
Location	Tatartup fortress, North Caucasus Line, Russian Empire
Result	Russian victory; Decline of Mansur's insurgency

Belligerents
Sheikh Mansur Movement: Chechens; Kabardia; Kumyks; Dagestanis	Russian Empire

Commanders and leaders
Sheikh Mansur	(Russian Empire) Larion Nagel

Strength
20,000	4,000: 2 Moscow regiments; 1 rifle battalion; 2 Kabardia and Selenga squadrons; 300 Don and Greben Cossacks

Casualties and losses
200	60

The Battle of Tatartup took place on 21 November 1785 between the Russian Empire and several North Caucasian nations led by Sheikh Mansur and ended in a second major defeat for the latter, which led to most of his soldiers leaving him, after which he took refuge in Anapa.

== History ==
After the defeat at Malka, the Russian Empire planned the complete destruction of the resistance movement Sheikh Mansur caused across the North Caucasus. A special unit was organized under the command of Colonel Nagel. This unit was composed of two regiments from Moscow, a rifle battalion, two squadrons from Kabardia and Selenga, and 300 Don and Greben Cossacks. On 21 November 1785, Colonel Nagel invaded Small Kabardia.
Having heard of the approach of the Russian army, Sheikh Mansur organized a small unit of Chechens, Kabardians, Kumyks and Dagestanis. The two sides met at the Tatartup fortress near the Malka River. During the fierce fighting that ensued, both sides suffered heavy casualties, and both Mansur and Nagel planned to withdraw their troops from the battle. Mansur first gave the order of retreat, and his troops returned home, while he took refuge in Anapa.
The result of this defeat was heavy for Mansur, because many of his supporters, amongst Kabardins, Kumyks and Daghestanis, lost their confidence in him, left Mansur and asked for forgiveness from the Tsarina of Russia. At the beginning of 1786, Dol Mudarov, Psheh of Small Kabardia and faithful supporter of Mansur was captured by the Russian army.

Although most of his men left him, Sheikh Mansur continued waging Guerrilla warfare against Russian soldiers, numbering an army of 600.

== See also ==
- Sheikh Mansur
- Battle of the Malka

== Sources ==
- Oztas, Ahmet (2013). A Page from the History of the North Caucasus: Imam Mansur Ushurma. EHESS. pp. 1–14.
- Kutlu, Tarık (2005). Tarihte Kafkasya [Caucasus in History] (in Turkish). Istanbul.
- Berkok, İsmail (1958). Çeçen Direniş Tarihi [History of the Chechen resistance] (in Turkish). Istanbul.
