= Sheikh Mansur =

Chechen Islamic and military leader

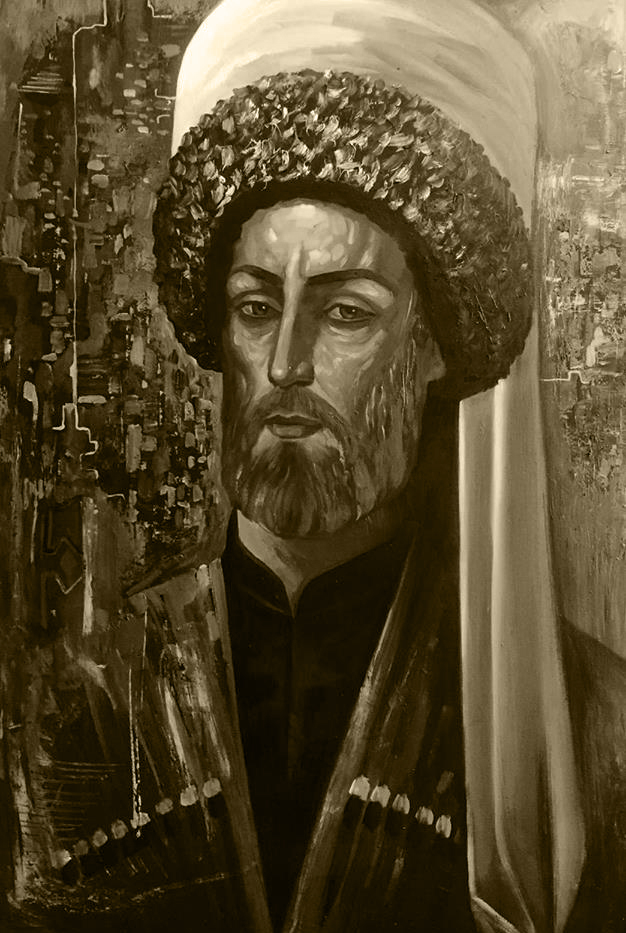
- A modern imagined depiction of Sheikh Mansur

Leader of the Sheikh Mansur movement
- Reign: 1785–1791
- Born: Ushurma/Uchermak c. 1760; Aldi, Chechnya
- Died: 13 April 1794; Shlisselburg, Russian Empire
- Military career
- Allegiance: Chechnya; Circassia
- Service years: About 6 years
- Conflicts: Sheikh Mansur movement; Chechen and Dagestani campaign (1785); Battle of Aldy; First Kizlyar; Attack on Karginsk; Battle with the Tomsk Regiment; Battle of Grigoriopolis; Second Kizlyar; Battle of Tatartup; Western Caucasus campaign (1787–1791); First Anapa campaign; Battle of the Urup River; Battle of the Kafar River; Second Urup River; Second Anapa campaign; Battle of the Ubin River; Siege of Anapa (1788); Third Anapa campaign; Battle of the Shibza River; 1790 siege of Anapa; Battle of the Tokhtamysh River; Second siege of Anapa; Final Siege of Anapa (POW)

Religious life
- Religion: Islam
- Denomination: Sunni
- Profession: Imam

Muslim leader
- Based in: Chechnya and Circassia
- Post: Religious leader of the Sheikh Mansur movement
- Period in office: 1785–1791

Sheikh Mansur (born Ushurma or Uchermak, c. 1760 – 13 April 1794) was a Chechen military commander and Islamic leader who led a resistance movement against Russian expansion into the Caucasus from 1785 until his capture in 1791. Sheikh Mansur is considered the first leader of the resistance in the North Caucasus against Russian imperialism. He remains a hero of the Chechen and North Caucasian peoples in general, and their struggle for independence.

== Biography ==
Sheikh Mansur, whose birth name was Ushurma or Uchermak, was born in Aldi, a small aul (village) located on the Sunzha River in Chechnya, near the modern-day Chechen capital of Grozny. Since he described himself as being a little over 30 years old to his Russian captors in 1791, it is assumed that he was born around 1760. He came from a family of poor Chechen farmers of the Elistanzhi teip (clan). His father's name was Shebesse or Shahbaz, and his family had previously lived in the village of Khattuni before settling in Aldi. Ushurma tended to his neighbors' flocks in his early life. Contemporary Russian and Ottoman sources report that he was illiterate, but he may have received some basic education from a local mullah or scholars in neighboring Dagestan, which was a significant center of Islamic learning. He married a woman named Checha and, according to one source, had a son and two daughters. According to another source, he had only two children. It is frequently assumed that he joined the Naqshbandi Sufi order, but, according to Michael Kemper, there is no evidence of this.

When Ushurma was 26 years old or older, he renounced ordinary life, divorced his wife, and secluded himself. He saw a vision of two mounted messengers from the prophet Muhammad who tasked him with preaching Islam to the Chechens and nearby peoples. Like earlier leaders who claimed supernatural powers, he often covered his face in front of his disciples. Some Russian sources incorrectly claim that he called himself a prophet. In 1784, he adopted the name Mansur (meaning "victorious" in Arabic) and began to style himself as the sheikh and imam of the mountain peoples. He called on them to adhere closely to the Sharia and to reject what he considered non-Islamic practices, such as customary law (adat), consumption of wine, and smoking tobacco. This was not easy in Chechnya, where Islamic tradition was not as entrenched as it was in Dagestan. The egalitarian implications of his message made it gain popularity among indigent peasants and other marginalized groups. Russian expansion had disrupted the pre-existing social order of various peoples of the North Caucasus, and inequality was rising between the lower classes and the nobility, who often collaborated with the Russians.

In March 1785, two earthquakes occurred which may have been seen as omens by local people. After this, Mansur rallied the Chechens to attack Kabarda in order to force them to adhere to the Sharia. It is not certain whether he was already advocating a holy war against the Russians. Despite this, Sheikh Mansur's actions came to the attention of the Russian military authorities, who sent a force under Colonel Pieri to capture the Chechen leader. The Russian force assaulted and destroyed Mansur's native village of Aldi, forcing its population to flee to the mountains. Sheikh Mansur and his disciples evaded capture and conducted a surprise attack on the Russians while they marched back. 600 Russian soldiers and officers, including Colonel Pieri, were killed. This success was seen as proof of that Mansur had the support of God. Nobles from Kabarda and Dagestan who had previously hesitated to join Mansur now brought their well-armed forces to his side. In the summer of 1785, Mansur's army, reportedly 10,000 strong, attacked the Russian town of Kizlyar and besieged it, but they had to abandon the siege because of the Russian cannons. They also failed to take the smaller fort of Grigoriopolis. Despite these setbacks, Mansur attacked Kizlyar again in August 1785. This failed attempt left many of his men dead and caused others to desert. Nevertheless, several influential Kabardian leaders and numerous Chechens, Kumyks and Dagestanis remained at his side. It was the subsequent defeat of Mansur's army in November 1785 by a Russian contingent commanded by Colonel Nagel that caused Mansur's noble allies to abandon him.

Mansur continued to attack Russian fortresses from the mountains of Chechnya. Losing many of his followers, he tried to achieve a truce with the Russians, but they would accept nothing less than his unconditional surrender. He sought followers in the Western Caucasus, inhabited by the Circassians. This may have also been motivated by the greater attention he was receiving from the Ottoman Empire, which had previously dismissed him as a "rabble-rouser". With another war between the Russian and Ottoman empires approaching, the Ottoman command in the Black Sea forts of Anapa and Soğucak saw an opportunity to unite the Circassian tribes through Sheikh Mansur and use them for military purposes. Mansur conducted several successful raids across the Kuban just before the beginning of the Russo-Turkish War. He took hundreds of prisoners and more livestock. However, a Russian expedition sent at the beginning of the war, in August 1787, inflicted several defeats on Mansur. He fought his last battle on the Urup River on 20 September 1787, against a Russian force commanded by General Peter Tekeli. After this, Mansur fled to Anapa. When Anapa fell to the Russians, he was captured and transported to Saint Petersburg, where Catherine the Great inspected him. He was initially held at the Peter and Paul Fortress. After he stabbed a guard to death during his interrogation, he was moved to the fortress of Shlisselburg, east of Saint Petersburg, where he died on 13 April 1794.

== Appearance ==
Sheikh Mansur is said to have had a striking physical appearance. Imam Shamil, a later leader of Muslim resistance to Russian expansion who was born three years after the Chechen leader's death, heard about Mansur from people who knew him personally. He said;

"Sheikh Mansur had a manly, fascinating appearance and, despite the fact that he did not know how to read and write, possessed an extraordinary gift of speech. [...] He was so tall that in a crowd of people he seemed to be sitting astride a horse.

The Russian historian Grigory Prozritelev also describes Mansur as follows:

"[a] tall, handsome, slender brunet with a pale face and passionate speech. [...] The young missionary's powerful speech and ardent preaching to the point of selflessness, along with his handsome, outstanding appearance, quickly gave him admirers of both sexes."

== Evaluation and legacy ==
Sheikh Mansur is considered a predecessor to the 19th-century Muslim resistance movement to Russian expansion into the Caucasus. John F. Baddeley writes that Mansur was "the first to preach and lead the... Holy War against the infidel Russians in the Caucasus [...] he it was who first taught them that in religious reform lay the one chance of preserving their cherished liberty and independence". Islamic scholar Alexander Knysh states that it is remarkable that Sheikh Mansur was able to resist the Russians for so long despite a number of personal disadvantages: he lacked the "Sufi credentials" of later Caucasian leaders, apparently lacked a formal religious education, and came from the lower classes (like most of his followers), which at first made the Ottomans ignore him and caused the nobility to either reject him or abandon him once there were setbacks. Knysh concurs with Baddeley that Mansur was "a born leader of men, endowed with some high qualities to a very remarkable degree". Mansur was revered by Imam Shamil, who credited him with effecting the Muslim revival in the North Caucasus.

Academic and popular sources were often confused about Sheikh Mansur's religious ideology, frequently characterizing him as a "false prophet", "charlatan" or "impostor". According to Knysh, this confusion derived from Russian authorities' lack of understanding of Islamic doctrines, reinforced by exaggerations by Sheikh Mansur's mostly illiterate followers. In the 18th century, a hoax appeared in a Florentine newspaper which alleged that Mansur was actually a former Dominican monk named Giovanni Battista Boetti; these claims were taken seriously by some 19th-century authors. Sheikh Mansur was the subject of two Romantic novels in the mid-19th century: one in Russian by V. I. Savinov (Shikh Mansur, 1853) and one in English by E. Spencer (The Prophet of the Caucasus, 1840).

Sheikh Mansur became a central nationalist symbol during the Chechen struggle for independence from Russia in the 1990s. In 1990, in one of the last acts of the Chechen-Ingush ASSR, Grozny's airport was named after Sheikh Mansur; the name has since been changed. Under the Chechen Republic of Ichkeria, the main square of Grozny, now called Akhmat Kadyrov Square, was named after Sheikh Mansur. Streets and squares in different parts of Chechnya were also named in Mansur's honor, although these have been renamed under Ramzan Kadyrov's leadership. Sheikh Mansur remains a popular figure in Chechnya. According to journalist Maaz Bilalov, books and articles about Mansur are popular, songs and poems are written about him, and his (fictional) portrait can be found in many houses. The Sheikh Mansur Battalion, a Chechen unit fighting on the Ukrainian side in the Russo-Ukrainian War, is named after him.

== See also ==
- Caucasian Imamate
- Russo-Circassian War
- Caucasian War
- Russian–Kumyk Wars
- Ghazi Muhammad
