= Nazran uprising =

Uprising of Ingush in 1858

Nazran Uprising
- Part of the Murid War
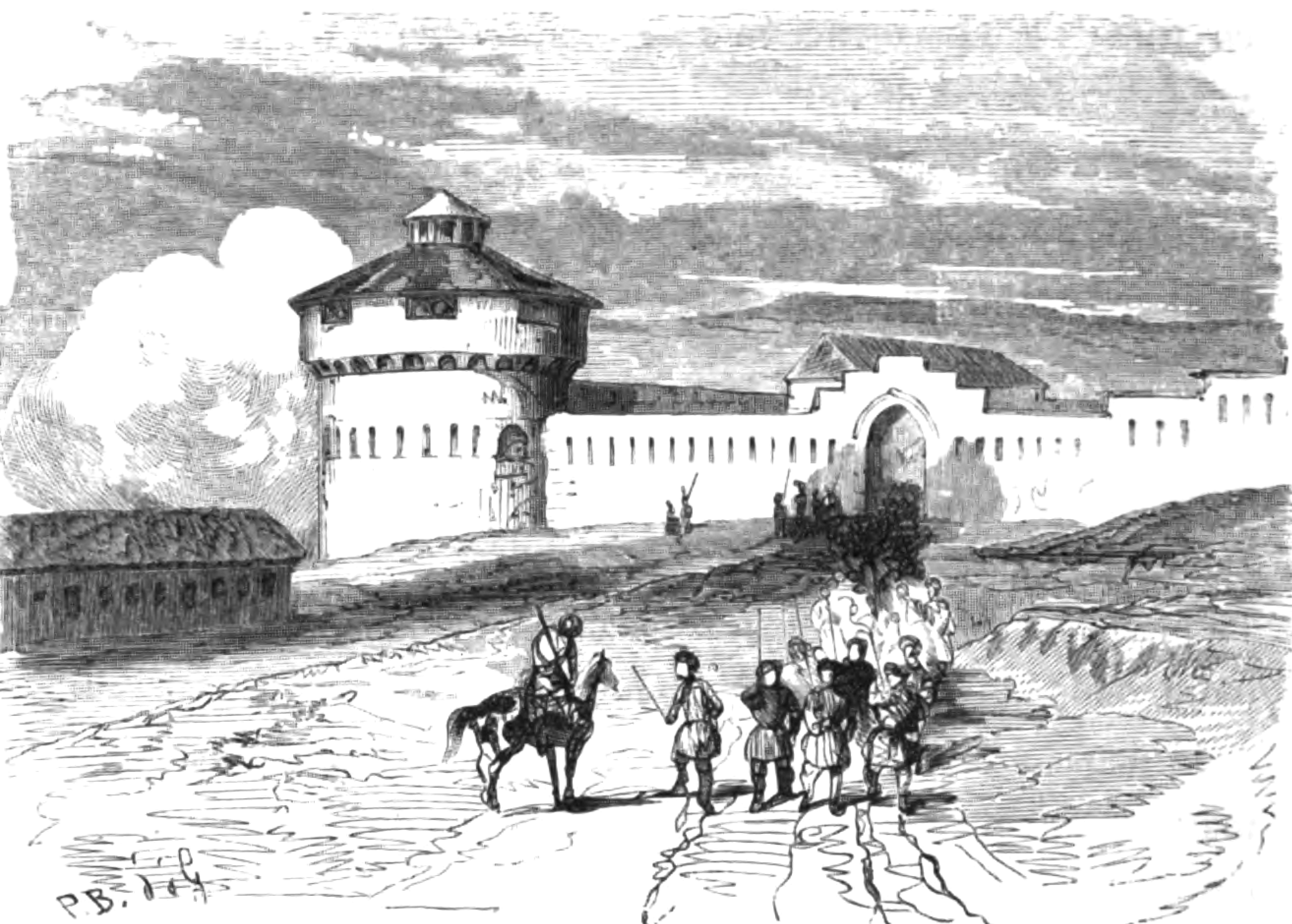
- Drawing of Nazran Fortress in 1859
Date	23 May – August 1858
Location	Nazran, Ingushetia
Result	Russian victory; Uprising suppressed; Leaders of the uprising executed or exiled

Belligerents
Russian Empire	(Ingushetia) Ingush rebels (Note: Consisted of Nazranians, Karabulaks and Galashians.); Supported by: Caucasian Imamate

Commanders and leaders
(Russian Empire) Pavel Zotov	(Ingushetia) Chandyr Archakov (executed); (Ingushetia) Mohammed Mazurov (executed); (Ingushetia) Jagostuko Bekhoev; (Ingushetia) Urusbi Mugaev (executed); (Ingushetia) Bashir Ashiev (executed); (Ingushetia) Dzhogast Bekhoev; Imam Shamil

Strength
Unknown	(Ingushetia) 5,000; First invasion: 8,000; Second invasion: 4,000

Casualties and losses
+16 killed +24 wounded	Heavy, at least 412 casualties

The Nazran uprising (Ingush: Наьсарен гӀовттам, romanized: Näsaren ġovttam, IPA: [ˈnɛ̯æsəɾʲeŋ ˈɣʷɔʊtːəm]; Russian: Назрановское восстание) of the Ingush people against Tsarist Russia took place during the Murid War in 1858.

In 1858, the Tsarist administration began forcibly enlarging small settlements into larger ones and banning Ingush highlanders from carrying knives. On 23 May, an attempt by the Bailiff of the Nazranian and Karabulak peoples to obtain necessary information about the number of residents in Nazranian Society, which brought unrest among the Ingush, became the final impetus for the uprising. Fearing an uprising, the bailiff requested military reinforcements at Nazran. On 24 May, Colonel Pavel Zotov arrived with Russian troops from Vladikavkaz Fortress. About 5,000 rebels unsuccessfully attempted to storm the Nazran Fortress once they had learned about the capture of deputies they had sent to Zotov. Russian troops repulsed the attackers with artillery and rifle fire. The leaders of the uprising, except Dzhogast Bekhoev, who escaped, were executed.

The Ingush sought the support of Imam Shamil, who decided to use this movement to combat the Russian offensive on Dagestan. In June 1858, he invaded Chechnya and soon arrived in Ingushetia. where the rebels welcomed him. The invasion failed due to division among the Nazranians and weak support for Shamil, who had insufficient supplies and the Nazranians did not provide him with any. Shamil retreated to Caucasian Imamate. In August, Shamil and a force of 4,000 again tried to break through to the Area of Nazran but in the Sunzha Valley, Russian forces led by Colonel Mishchenko immediately attacked Shamil's forces, which were completely destroyed, forcing Shamil retreat with a large number of casualties.

== Names ==
The Nazran uprising is known in Russian sources by various names, such as the "Nazran rebellion", the "Nazran outrage", the Nazran riot, the Nazran incident, and the "uprising of Ingush". The most-commonly used name is "Nazran uprising". Official documents refer to it as the "Nazran rebellion" (Назрановское возмущение).

== Background ==
The uprising took place toward the end of the Caucasian War, when Russia was expanding into the Caucasus. Russia had already carried out earlier military expeditions to Ingushetia, like the 1830 expedition of General Ivan Abkhazov and the 1832 expedition of Baron Georgi Rozen. Beginning in 1845, Russian authorities displaced the Ingush and built Cossack stanitsas on the site of their former villages in order to construct the Sunzha line. The Ingush had formed small villages on the plains with several families in each. In the 1850s, to make it easier to control and oversee the local population, Russian authorities planned to forcibly merge small settlements into larger ones, requiring every village to have at least 300 households.

According to reports of Russian officials, the forcible consolidation of villages, and the organized census were the reasons for the uprising. Soviet Russian historian Nikolai Pokrovsky disagreed with this version, saying the actual cause was the expropriation of Ingush lands to free up land, on which the future Cossack stanitsas could be established. The stanitsas divided Ingushetia into two parts: mountainous and plain. The uprising may also have been caused by a ban on carrying knives. According to Commander-in-Chief of the Caucasian Army and General Aleksandr Baryatinsky:

The main reason for the Nazran uprising was the impossibility of having proper supervision of the inhabitants during scattered settlement in separate farms, and therefore I recognized it necessary to settle them in large auls in the places we had chosen [...] At the same time, completely independently of this, the Committee established in Vladikavkaz to analyze personal and land rights of the natives demanded from the Nazran deputies information on the population. Opponents of public order took advantage of the clash of these two circumstances and angered the people.

== Storming of Nazran Fortress ==
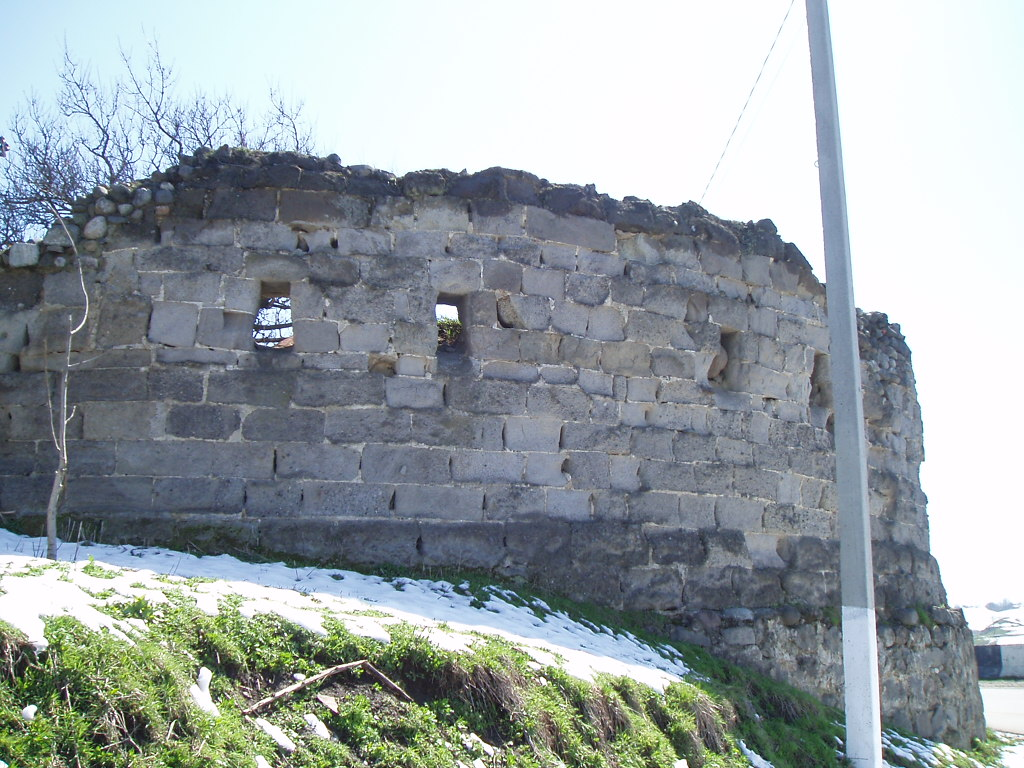
Remains of Nazran Fortress in 2011.

On 23 May 1858, the final impetus for the uprising was an attempt by the bailiff of the Nazranian and Karabulak peoples to obtain information about the number of residents in Nazranian society to resolve the issue of land acquisition and merge small villages into larger ones. Few Ingush agreed to move to Russia's appointed large settlements; most were against this, the foremen told the bailiff he would not permit those who wanted to move to large villages to do so. In the evening, gangs of Ingush horsemen traveled around the surrounding villages and with gunshots called people to arms to the heights opposite Nazran Fortress. To prevent the escalation of the uprising, the bailiff asked Russian authorities to send military reinforcements to Nazran.

The following day, Colonel Pavel Zotov arrived with Russian troops from Vladikavkaz Fortress. Zotov ordered the local Nazranian foremen to calm the people.

On 25 May, Ingush of Russian officer ranks appeared before Pavel Zotov, who wanted to send them to the crowds of rebellious Ingush so that they could influence the rebels in his favor. The crowd did not accept these officers and threatened to kill them. By noon, a deputation of 6 people, including four main leaders of the uprising, went to Zotov and stated the Ingush people did not want to settle in large villages, and that they did not know who had been involved in the gangs and would not extradite them. Zotov demanded an end to the unrest and kept four leaders of the movement as hostages. The rebels, numbering about 5,000, unsuccessfully tried to storm Nazran Fortress once they learned about the capture of the deputies. Russian troops repulsed the attackers with artillery and rifle fire, killing 370 rebels, while the Russians suffered 16 killed and 24 wounded.

The uprising affected neighboring Ingush societies that were also raising movements. On May 28, the Khamkhins held a public meeting to provide assistance to the Nazranians; they invited the Feappii and Dzherakh but these societies did not attend the meeting. At the same time, according to one Russian report, "a huge party of disobedient people stands not far from the village of Tsorins".

The uprising was led by three men: Chandyr Archakov, Magomet Mazurov and Dzhagostuko Bekhoev. Together with mullahs Bashir Ashiev (an ethnic Kumyk) and Urusbi Mugaev, they planned the uprising and took part in writing a letter to Imam Shamil on behalf of the entire Nazranian society with a proposal to take an oath of allegiance to Shamil and secede from Russian rule. Shamil replied to the letter with an appeal, calling for them to join his army.

== Imam Shamil's support ==
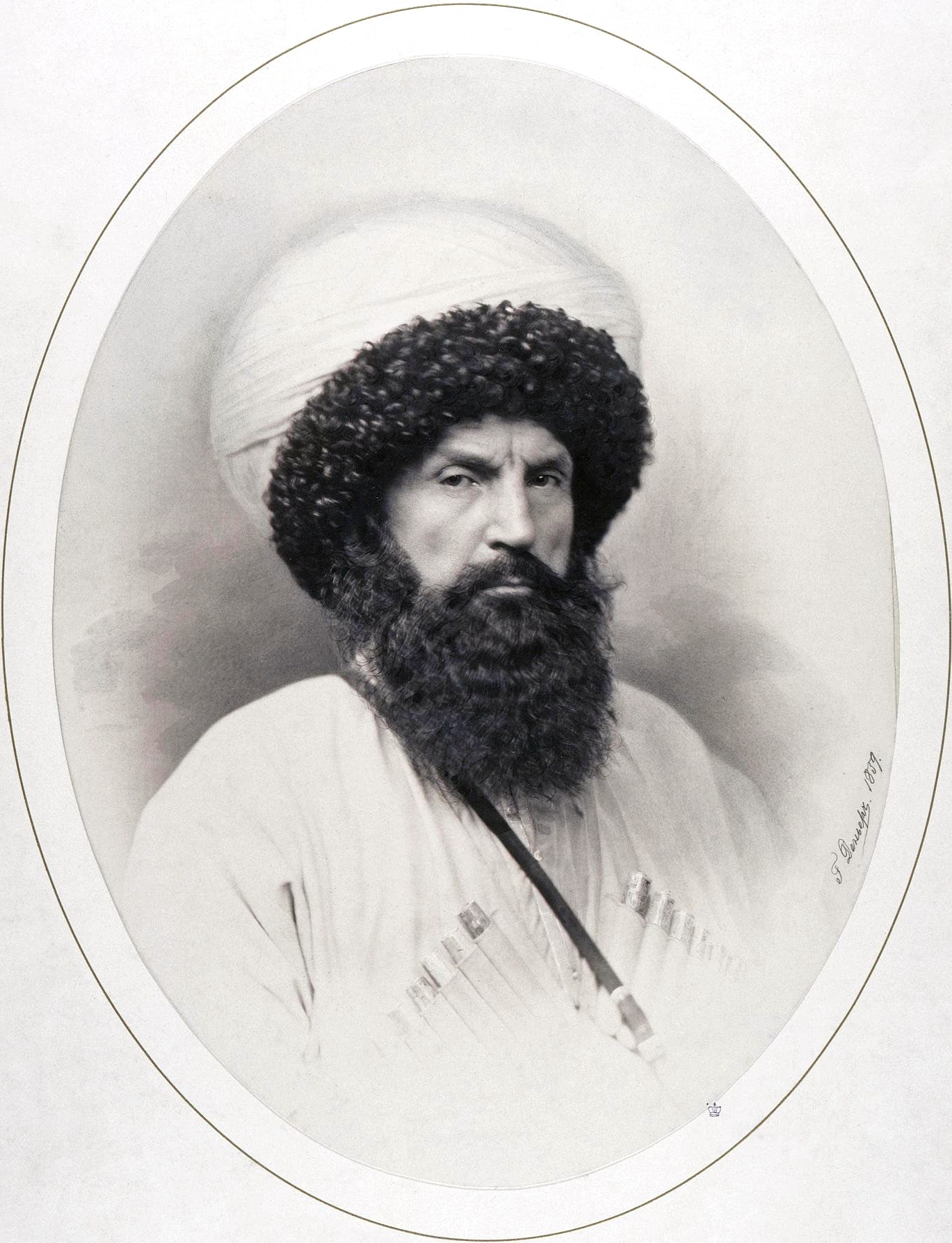
Imam Shamil in 1859.

The Ingush sought the support of Shamil, who decided to use this movement to further his political plans to combat the Russian offensive on Dagestan. On 29 May, Sabdulla Gekhinskiy, the naib (governor) of Gekhi, sent seven messengers to the Galashians and Nazranians with the announcement of Shamil's imminent arrival, and offered to hand over the amanats. (Note: Amanat–hostage, given as security for a contract.) On 1 June, the messengers returned to Shamil with the amanats brought from these societies. Shamil sent the amanats back, promising support and providing them with an appeal to the Ingush people for a general uprising. He carried out a general mobilization, gathering an 8,000-strong army—mostly Tavlins. In response to Shamil mobilizing troops, Russian forces gathered two divisions, six battalions, fourteen companies, sixteen Cossack sotnia, twenty-two cavalry, and foot-and-mountain guns. These Russian forces were located at strategically important points in Assinovskaya, Achkhoy-Martan, Tarskaya Valley, and in front of the Vladikavkaz fortress. By taking advantage of the uprising of the Nazranians and Galashians, Shamil invaded Little Chechnya.

Ingush rebels greeted Shamil's appearance in Ingushetia with joy. The Galashians recognized his power and handed over the amanats. A majority of Karabulak and Galashian elders defected to Shamil but weak support for him and division among Nazranians caused his failure. Shamil had insufficient supplies and the Nazranians did not provide him with any. Shamil was forced to retreat and on 9 June, one of Shamil's detachments under the command of his son Kazi-Magomet was defeated in a minor skirmish near the village of Achkhoy, losing 50 people.

During Shamil’s retreat, some of the Nazranians, mainly from the Temirkhanov family, pursued and crushed his rearguard. Shamil moved to the Fortanga river and, occupied the villages of Alkun and Muzhichi in Assa Gorge. From there, Shamil tried to reach Vladikavkaz along the Akhki-Yurt Gorge. On 13 June, Shamil's forces camped in the upper reaches of the Sunzha river but the Russian forces again reinforced their troops with 600 Alagir, and Kurtat, the Ossetian militia and 200 of the mountain Cossack regiment, which were force-marched to Vladikavkaz.

Shamil, realizing he would not be able to break through to the plains, gave the order to retreat and on 15 June, the troops moved toward Meredzhi and Dattykh. While Shamil's troops were retreating, Russian troops simultaneously retook their territories from the retreating Shamil's army. After Shamil passed through Akkin and Shatoy societies, and crossed both currents of the Argun river, he dissolved part of the army and retreated to the Imamate's capital Vedeno.

In August 1858, Shamil and a force of 4,000 again tried to break through to the Nazran area but in the Sunzha Valley, Russian forces led by Colonel Mishchenko immediately attacked Shamil's forces, which were completely destroyed, leaving Shamil no choice but to retreat. Shamil lost 370 of his men and 1,700 weapons while the Russians had only 16 men dead and 24 wounded. According to Shamil, he was invited by Mussa Kundukhov, the commander of the Military-Ossetian okrug, who promised to cooperate with him.

== Aftermath ==
The Nazran uprising ended with a defeat for the rebels, which marked the conquest of Ingushetia by the Russian Empire. The leaders of the uprising; Chandyr Archakov, Magomed Mazurov, Dzhogast Bekhoev, mullahs Bashir Ashiev and Urusbi Mugaev were sentenced to death by hanging. Bekhoev escaped but later returned with confession and was forgiven by the Russian authorities; the others were hanged on 25 June 1858. Thirty-two people were each sentenced to 1,000 times running the gauntlet, thirty to hard labor, five to indefinite work in mines, and twenty-five to work in factories for eight years.

Furthermore, as recommended by Adjutant General Aleksandr Baryatinsky, the tsar of Russia Alexander II deprived the Nazranians of few privileges granted to them by Russia: 1) the Russian banner granted to them, 2) the dismissal of the two banner bearers and the termination of their annual salary of twelve silver rubles, and 3) the right not to pay taxes to the Russian authorities.

After the uprising, the Russian authorities forcibly merged smaller settlements into larger ones in the fall of 1858 to the spring of 1859 as they planned before the uprising. Thus were founded the villages of Plievo, Barsuki, Gamurzievo, Altievo, Nasyr-Kort, Bazorkino, Ekazhevo, Surkhakhi and Kantyshevo, which were later populated by Ingush of the rivers of Assa, Sunzha and Kambileyevka in the late 1850s to early 1860s, whose villages were transformed into stanitsas and resettled by Cossacks.

The rebels' defeat may have saved them from a planned program of the Russian authorities by which they would have been deported to the Don river with their empty lands being then settled by Russians in order to increase latter's population in the Caucasus. The Russian authorities concluded after the uprising:

If only the offer to peaceful Nazranians to concentrate in large villages, on the plot of land they occupied, served as a pretext for an uprising, then the offer to the mountaineers, who have to express humility, to leave their homeland and go to the Don will serve as a pretext for a fierce war and, therefore, will lead to extermination, and not the obedience of the highlanders.

== Sources ==
=== Russian sources ===
- Anchabadze, G. Z. (2001). Gelashvili, N. V. (ed.). Вайнахи [Vainakhs] (PDF) (in Russian). Tbilisi: Kavkazskiy dom. pp. 1–97.
- Arapov, D. Yu.; Babich, I. L.; Bobrovnikov, V. O.; Gakkaev, J.; Kazharov, V. Kh.; Krishtopa, A. E.; Solovyeva, L. T.; Sotavov, N. A.; Tsutsiev, A. A. (2007). Bobrovnikov, В. О.; Babich, I. L.; Redkollegiya serii "Okrainy Rossiyskoy imperii" (eds.). Северный Кавказ в составе Российской империи [North Caucasus as part of the Russian Empire]. Historia Rossica (in Russian). Moskva: Novoe literaturnoe obozrenie. ISBN 978-5867935290.
- Schmidt, O. Yu.; et al., eds. (1926). "Аманат" [Amanat]. Bolshaya sovetskaya entsoklopediya (in Russian). Vol. 2: Akonit - Anri (1st ed.). Moskva: Izd-vo Bolshaya sovetskaya entsoklopediya. col. 374 – via Wikisource.
- Dadaev, Yusup (2009). Наибы и мудиры Шамиля [Naibs and mudirs of Shamil] (in Russian). Makhachkala: DINEM. ISBN 978-5-91446-011-9.
- Dolgieva, M. B.; Kartoev, M. M.; Kodzoev, N. D.; Matiev, T. Kh. (2013). Kodzoev, N. D.; et al. (eds.). История Ингушетии [History of Ingushetia] (4th ed.). Rostov-Na-Donu: Yuzhnyy izdatelsky dom. ISBN 978-5-98864-056-1.
- Genko, A. N. (1930). "Из культурного прошлого ингушей" [From the cultural past of the Ingush] (PDF). Записки коллегии востоковедов при Азиатском музее [Notes of the College of Orientalists at the Asian Museum] (PDF) (in Russian). Vol. 5. Leningrad: Izd-vo Akademii nauk SSSR. pp. 681–761.
- Gritsenko, Nikolai (1971). Классовая борьба крестьян в чечено-ингушетии на рубеже XIX-XX веков [The class struggle of peasants in Chechen-Ingushetia at the turn of the 19th-20th centuries] (in Russian). Grozny: Chech.-Ing. kn. izd-vo.
- Matiev, Timur; Muzhukhoeva, Elza (2013). "Социально-политическое развитие в XIX—начале XX века" [Socio-political development in the 19th - early 20th centuries]. In Albogachieva, Makka; Martazanov, Arsamak; Solovyeva, Lyubov (eds.). Ингуши [The Ingush]. Narody I kultury (in Russian). Moscow: Nauka. pp. 58–69. ISBN 978-5-02-038042-4.
- Martirosian, G. K. (1933). История Ингушии: Материалы [History of Ingushiya: Materials] (in Russian). Ordzhonikidze: Serdalo.
- Milyutin, Dmitry (2004). Zakharova, Larisa (ed.). Воспоминания 1856-1860 [Memorials 1856-1860] (in Russian). Moscow: ROSSPEN. ISBN 5-8243-0350-9.
- Narochnitsky, A. L.; et al., eds. (1988). История народов Северного Кавказа (конец XVIII в. — 1917 г.) [History of the peoples of the North Caucasus (late 18th century - 1917)] (in Russian). Moskva: Nauka. ISBN 5-02-009408-0.
- Osmanov, Ahmed. "Ингуши́" [The Ingush]. Great Russian Encyclopedia (in Russian).
- Pokrovsky, N. I. (2000) [1941]. Gadzhiev, V. G.; Pokrovsky, N. N. (eds.). Кавказские войны и имамат Шамиля [Caucasian Wars and Shamil's Imamate] (in Russian). Moskva: ROSSPEN.
- Shnirelman, V. A. (2006). Kalinin, I. (ed.). Быть Аланами: Интеллектуалы и политика на Северном Кавказе в XX веке [To be Alans: Intellectuals and Politics in the North Caucasus in the 20th Century] (in Russian). Moskva: Novoe literaturnoe obozrenie. ISBN 5-86793-406-3. ISSN 1813-6583.
- Skitsky, B. V. (1972). Tedtoev, A. A. (ed.). Очерки истории горских народов [Essays on the history of mountain peoples] (in Russian). Ordzhonikidze: In-t istorii, ekonomiki, yaz. i lit. pri Sovete Ministrov SOASSR.
- Tsutsiev, A. A. (1998). Осетино-ингушский конфликт (1992—...): его предыстория и факторы развития. Историко-социологический очерк [Ossetian-Ingush conflict (1992–...): its background and development factors. Historical and sociological essay] (in Russian). Moskva: ROSSPEN. ISBN 5-86004-178-0.
