= Barsuki, Ingushetia =

Rural locality in Ingushetia

Barsuki Барсуки
- Selo

Other transcription(s)
  - Ingush: Буро́-Кӏале́ (Note: • Modernly mentioned as 'Buro-K'ale' (Ingush: Буро́-Кӏале́), however in the past, the village was mentioned as 'Buro-K'alkhe' (Ingush: Буро-КIалхе).)
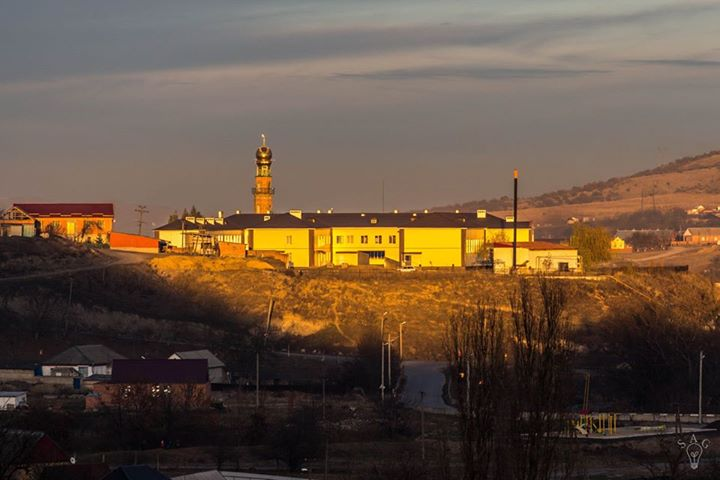
- Interactive map of Barsuki
- Location of Barsuki Barsuki (Republic of Ingushetia)
- Coordinates: 43°15′39″N 44°48′28″E
- Country: Russia
- Federal subject: Ingushetia
- Founded: 1836
- Elevation: 523 m (1,716 ft)

Population (2010 Census)
  - Total: 10 333
  - Estimate (2021): 7,601

Administrative status
  - Subordinated to: Nazranovsky District
- Time zone: UTC+3 (MSK)
- Postal code: 386128
- OKTMO ID: 26605410101

Barsuki (Ingush: Буро́-Кӏале́, romanized: Buro-Kʼale) is a rural locality (a selo) in Nazranovsky District of the Republic of Ingushetia, Russia. It forms the municipality of the rural settlement of Barsuki as the only settlement in its composition.

== Geography ==
The village is located at the confluence of the Nazranka River with the Sunzha, northeast of the district center of the city of Nazran. The main part of the village is located between Sunzha (in the east) and the Alkhanchurt Canal (in the west). On the eastern outskirts of the village are the federal highway "Kavkaz" and the railway line of the North Caucasian Railway (section Beslan - Sleptsovskaya).

The nearest settlements: in the northwest - the village of Verkhnie Achaluki, in the northeast - the village of Plievo, in the east - the village of Gazi-Yurt, in the south - the village of Ekazhevo and in the southwest - the city of Nazran.

== Etymology ==
The Russian name of the settlement, according to some sources, goes back to the name of the officer Bortsak Malsagov. The Ingush name of the village "Буро́-Кӏале́" (also "БурокIалхе") is translated as "under the fortress" or "under the fortification".

== History ==
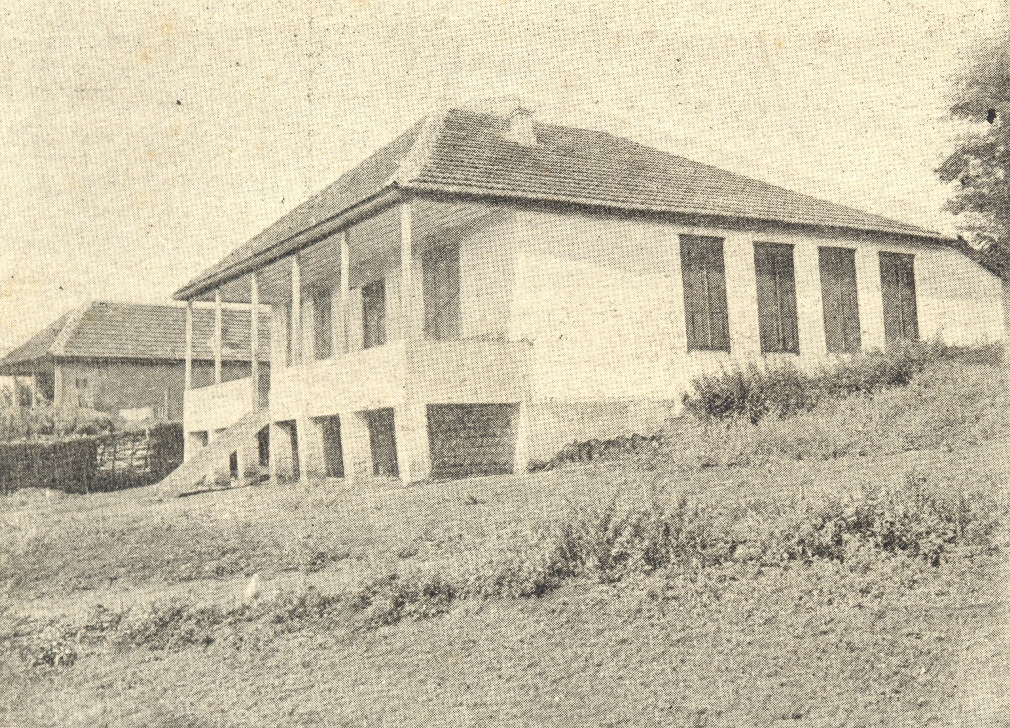
School in the village of Barsuki

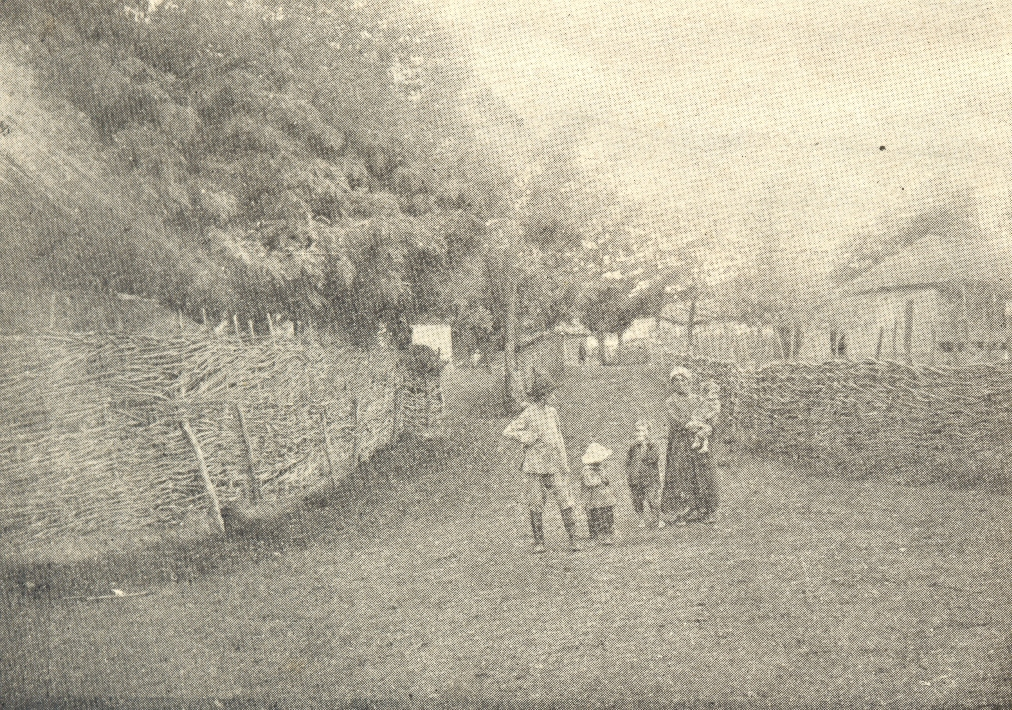
Street in the village of Barsuki

Barsuki was founded in 1836. Characteristics of the village (village Bursuka) as of 1874: "at the confluence of the Nazranovka River into the Sunzha river", 232 houses, 1161 residents (577 males and 584 females), Ingush (Sunni Muslims) live.

As of 1925, the village of Bursuki was the center of the Bursukovsky village council of the Nazranovsky district of the Ingush Autonomous Oblast of the North Caucasus Krai, which also included the Nazran fortress. The village consisted of 492 households, 2472 people lived in it (1217 males and 1255 females). The settlement at the Nazran fortress included only 13 households, 121 people lived (69 males and 52 females). The village had 2 wells, a primary school, 14 small industrial enterprises (including 12 mills and 2 forges), a state sack point, and 2 party organizations. Also, one school of the first stage was located in the settlement at the Nazran fortress.

From 1944 to 1958, during the period of the deportation of Chechens and Ingush and the abolition of the Chechen-Ingush Autonomous Soviet Socialist Republic, the village was called Khordzhin (translated from Ossetian — "fruitful").

As of January 1, 1990, the village was the center of the Barsukinsky village council, which also included two small farms — Tibi-Khi and Blue Stone. In the village itself, on that date, 3002 people of the actual population lived.

In 1995, the village of Barsuki was abolished and included in the city of Nazran as one of the administrative districts. In 2009, on the basis of the abolished Barsukinsky administrative district, withdrawn from the city, the village of Barsuki was recreated and a municipal formation was formed on its basis with the status of a rural settlement as part of the Nazranovsky district.

== Notable people ==
- Magomet-Mirza Tarievich Altemirov — statesman and military figure. Head of the Ingush militia in 1920–1932.
- Idris Beysultanovich Zyazikov — statesman. The first head of the Ingush Autonomous Oblast.
- Dzhabrail Dabievich Kartoyev (1907–1981) — military, public and economic figure, holder of five military orders, Hero of the Soviet Union (November 1943).
- Bagaudin Zyazikov — writer, translator, critic, journalist.
- Tamerlan Temirsoltanovich Nugzarov (1942–2020) — circus rider, animal trainer, People's Artist of the RSFSR (1985).

== Bibliography ==
- Барахоева, Н. М.; Кодзоев, Н. Д.; Хайров, Б. А. (2016). Ингушско-русский словарь терминов [Ingush-Russian dictionary of terms] (in Ingush and Russian) (2 ed.). Нальчик: ООО «Тетраграф». pp. 1–288.
- Кодзоев, Н. Д. (2021). Хайрова, Р. Р. (ed.). Русско-ингушский словарь [Russian-Ingush dictionary] (in Ingush and Russian). Ростов-на-Дону. pp. 1–656. ISBN 978-5-906785-55-8.
- Мальсагов, З. К. (1963). Оздоева, Ф. (ed.). Грамматика ингушского языка [Grammar of the Ingush language] (in Ingush and Russian). Vol. 5 (2nd ed.). Грозный: Чечено-Ингушское Книжное Издательство. pp. 1–164.
- Волкова, Н. Г. (1974). Этнический состав населения Северного Кавказа в XVIII — начале XX века [Ethnic composition of the population of the North Caucasus in the 18th - early 20th centuries] (in Russian). Москва: Наука. pp. 1–276.
- Оздоев, И. А. (1980). Оздоева, Ф. Г.; Куркиев, А. С. (eds.). Русско-ингушский словарь: 40 000 слов [Russian-Ingush dictionary: 40,000 words] (in Ingush and Russian). Москва: Русский язык. pp. 1–832.
