= Kantyshevo =

Kantyshevo Кантышево
- Village
- Location within Republic of Ingushetia Location within Russia
- Coordinates: 43°13′N 44°38′E
- Country: Russia
- Region: Republic of Ingushetia
- District: Nazranovsky District
- Time zone: UTC+3:00

Kantyshevo (Russian: Кантышево) is a rural locality (a village) in Nazranovsky District, Republic of Ingushetia, Russia. Population:16,783 (2021 census);

== Geography ==
This rural locality is located 11 kilometres (6.8 mi) from Nazran (the district's administrative centre), 16 kilometres (9.9 mi) from Magas (capital of Republic of Ingushetia) and 1,504 kilometres (935 mi) from Moscow. Dolakovo is the nearest rural locality.
