= Ali-Yurt =

Ali-Yurt Али-Юрт
- Village
- Location within Republic of Ingushetia Location within Russia
- Coordinates: 43°08′N 44°50′E
- Country: Russia
- Region: Republic of Ingushetia
- District: Nazranovsky District
- Time zone: UTC+3:00

Ali-Yurt (Russian: Али-Юрт) is a rural locality (a village) in Nazranovsky District, Republic of Ingushetia, Russia. Population:6,366 (2021 census);

== Geography ==
This rural locality is located 11 kilometres (6.8 mi) from Nazran (the district's administrative centre), 4 kilometres (2.5 mi) from Magas (capital of Republic of Ingushetia) and 1,520 kilometres (940 mi) from Moscow. Magas is the nearest rural locality.
