= Plievo =

Rural locality in Ingushetia

Plievo Плиево
- Selo

Other transcription(s)
  - Ingush: Пхьилекъонгий-Юрт (Note: • Commonly mentioned as 'Phileqongiy-Yurt' (Ingush: Пхьилекъонгий-Юрт), however the village was sometimes mentioned as 'Pheleq-Yurt' (Ingush: Пхьелекъ-Йурт).)
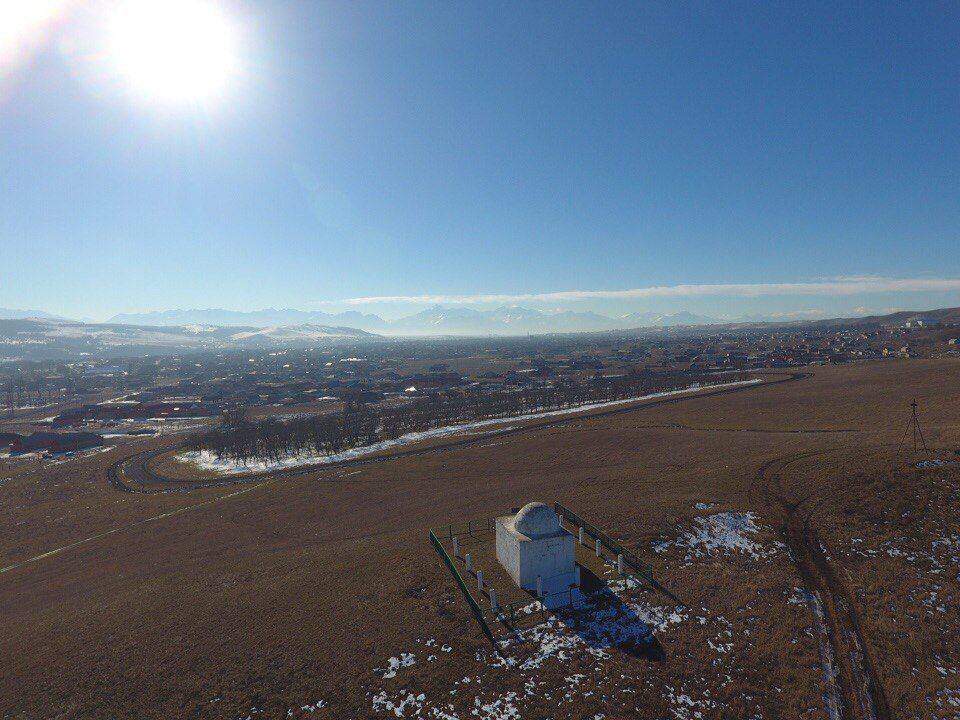
- View of the village from the mausoleum "Borga-Kash"
- Interactive map of Plievo
- Location of Plievo Plievo (Republic of Ingushetia)
- Coordinates: 43°17′02″N 44°50′22″E
- Country: Russia
- Federal subject: Ingushetia
- Founded: 1781
- Elevation: 481 m (1,578 ft)

Population (2010 Census)
  - Total: 13 685
  - Estimate (2021): 16 440

Administrative status
  - Subordinated to: Nazranovsky District
- Time zone: UTC+3 (MSK)
- Postal code: 386124
- OKTMO ID: 26605405101

Plievo (Ingush: Пхьилекъонгий-Юрт, romanized: Phileqongiy-Yurt) is a rural locality (a selo) in Nazranovsky District of the Republic of Ingushetia, Russia. It forms the municipality of the rural settlement of Plievo as the only settlement in its composition.

== Geography ==
The village is located on the left bank of the Sunzha River, east of the Alkhanchurt Canal, 3 km northeast of the regional center - the city of Nazran and 11 km north of the city of Magas.

To the south and east of the village is the federal highway "Kavkaz". The railway line of the North Caucasian Railway (section Beslan - Sleptsovskaya) passes through the village itself and the Plievo station operates.

The nearest settlements are: in the northeast — the city of Karabulak, in the east — the village of Yandare, in the south — the village of Gazi-Yurt, in the southwest — the village of Barsuki and in the northwest - the villages of Upper Achaluki and Middle Achaluki.

== History ==
On the territory of the rural settlement of Plievo, to the north of the village itself, there is a historical monument mausoleum "Borga-Kash", which dates back to 1405–1406.

According to official data, the village of Plievo was founded in 1781 (although a later date, 1836, is also found in scientific works). The first settlers were representatives of the Pliev taïp, which is also the reason for the name of the village (Ingush: Пхьилекъонгий-Юрт, Phileqongiy-Yurt literally means, according to some sources, “the village of the sons of Pkhyile”, that is, "the village of the Plievs").

Characteristics of the village (village "Пліева") as of 1874: "near Sunzha, on the Grozny postal road", 247 houses, 1315 inhabitants (645 males and 670 females), Ingush (Sunni Muslims) live.

As of 1925, the village of Plievo was the center of the village council of the Nazranovsky district of the Ingush Autonomous Oblast of the North Caucasus Krai, it consisted of 573 households, 2668 people lived in it (1351 males and 1317 females). In the village there was a school of the first stage, 8 mills, which at that time were classified as small industrial enterprises, 2 state filling points and 2 party organizations.

In 1944, in connection with the deportation of Chechens and Ingush and the abolition of the Chechen-Ingush ASSR, the village of Plievo was transferred to the North Ossetian ASSR and renamed Akhsar (translated from Ossetian — "valor", "heroism"). After the restoration of the Chechen-Ingush ASSR in 1958, the village was returned to its historical name - Plievo.

According to information on January 1, 1990, the village of Plievo was the center of the Pliev village council, which, in addition to it, included the Gazi-Yurt farm and several small settlements - the villages of Albastbalka and Razdolie, as well as settlements at Duekers 4, 6 and 7 on the Alkhanchurt Canal. In the village itself, on that date, 5812 people of the present population lived.

In 1995, Plievo was abolished and included in the city of Nazran as one of the administrative districts. In 2009, on the basis of the abolished Plievsky administrative district, withdrawn from the city, the village of Plievo was recreated and a municipal formation was formed on its basis with the status of a rural settlement as part of the Nazranovsky District.

== Bibliography ==
- Волкова, Н. Г. (1974). Этнический состав населения Северного Кавказа в XVIII — начале XX века [Ethnic composition of the population of the North Caucasus in the 18th - early 20th centuries] (in Russian). Москва: Наука. pp. 1–276.
- Оздоев, И. А. (1980). Оздоева, Ф. Г.; Куркиев, А. С. (eds.). Русско-ингушский словарь: 40 000 слов [Russian-Ingush dictionary: 40,000 words] (in Ingush and Russian). Москва: Русский язык. pp. 1–832.
- Барахоева, Н. М.; Кодзоев, Н. Д.; Хайров, Б. А. (2016). Ингушско-русский словарь терминов [Ingush-Russian dictionary of terms] (in Ingush and Russian) (2 ed.). Нальчик: ООО «Тетраграф». pp. 1–288.
- Кодзоев, Н. Д. (2021). Хайрова, Р. Р. (ed.). Русско-ингушский словарь [Russian-Ingush dictionary] (in Ingush and Russian). Ростов-на-Дону. pp. 1–656. ISBN 978-5-906785-55-8.
- Мальсагов, З. К. (1963). Оздоева, Ф. (ed.). Грамматика ингушского языка [Grammar of the Ingush language] (in Ingush and Russian). Vol. 5 (2nd ed.). Грозный: Чечено-Ингушское Книжное Издательство. pp. 1–164.
