= Barsuki =

Barsuki (Russian: Барсуки; Kazakh: Борсык) is the name of several geographical locations.

== Kazakhstan ==
- Barsuki Desert, Aktobe Region

== Bryansk Oblast ==
As of 2012, three rural localities in Bryansk Oblast bear this name:

- Barsuki, Rognedinsky District, Bryansk Oblast, a village in Sharovichsky Rural Administrative Okrug of Rognedinsky District; 53°57′N 33°46′E
- Barsuki, Surazhsky District, Bryansk Oblast, a village in Dubrovsky Rural Administrative Okrug of Surazhsky District; 53°13′N 32°29′E
- Barsuki, Zhiryatinsky District, Bryansk Oblast, a settlement in Vorobeynsky Rural Administrative Okrug of Zhiryatinsky District; 53°9′N 33°19′E

== Chelyabinsk Oblast ==
As of 2012, one rural locality in Chelyabinsk Oblast bears this name:

- Barsuki, Chelyabinsk Oblast, a village in Travnikovsky Selsoviet of Chebarkulsky District

== Republic of Ingushetia ==
As of 2023, one rural locality in the Republic of Ingushetia bears this name:

- Barsuki, Ingushetia, a selo in Nazranovsky District

== Ivanovo Oblast ==
As of 2012, two rural localities in Ivanovo Oblast bear this name:

- Barsuki, Kineshemsky District, Ivanovo Oblast, a village in Kineshemsky District
- Barsuki, Yuryevetsky District, Ivanovo Oblast, a village in Yuryevetsky District

== Kaluga Oblast ==
As of 2012, five rural localities in Kaluga Oblast bear this name:

- Barsuki, Dzerzhinsky District, Kaluga Oblast, a village in Dzerzhinsky District
- Barsuki, Kirovsky District, Kaluga Oblast, a village in Kirovsky District
- Barsuki, Kuybyshevsky District, Kaluga Oblast, a village in Kuybyshevsky District
- Barsuki, Mosalsky District, Kaluga Oblast, a village in Mosalsky District
- Barsuki, Zhukovsky District, Kaluga Oblast, a village in Zhukovsky District

== Moscow Oblast ==
As of 2012, three rural localities in Moscow Oblast bear this name:

- Barsuki, Lukhovitsky District, Moscow Oblast, a village in Gazoprovodskoye Rural Settlement of Lukhovitsky District; 54°48′N 39°21′E
- Barsuki, Mozhaysky District, Moscow Oblast, a village in Poretskoye Rural Settlement of Mozhaysky District; 55°41′N 35°36′E
- Barsuki, Yegoryevsky District, Moscow Oblast, a village in Yurtsovskoye Rural Settlement of Yegoryevsky District; 55°17′N 39°9′E

== Novgorod Oblast ==
As of 2012, one rural locality in Novgorod Oblast bears this name:

- Barsuki, Novgorod Oblast, a village in Krasnoborskoye Settlement of Kholmsky District

== Pskov Oblast ==
As of 2012, seven rural localities in Pskov Oblast bear this name:

- Barsuki, Loknyansky District, Pskov Oblast, a village in Loknyansky District
- Barsuki (Lekhovskaya Rural Settlement), Nevelsky District, Pskov Oblast, a village in Nevelsky District; municipally, a part of Lekhovskaya Rural Settlement of that district
- Barsuki (Lobkovskaya Rural Settlement), Nevelsky District, Pskov Oblast, a village in Nevelsky District; municipally, a part of Lobkovskaya Rural Settlement of that district
- Barsuki, Novorzhevsky District, Pskov Oblast, a village in Novorzhevsky District
- Barsuki, Opochetsky District, Pskov Oblast, a village in Opochetsky District
- Barsuki (Idritsa Urban Settlement), Sebezhsky District, Pskov Oblast, a village in Sebezhsky District; municipally, a part of Idritsa Urban Settlement of that district
- Barsuki (Sebezh Urban Settlement), Sebezhsky District, Pskov Oblast, a village in Sebezhsky District; municipally, a part of Sebezh Urban Settlement of that district

== Ryazan Oblast ==
As of 2012, one rural locality in Ryazan Oblast bears this name:

- Barsuki, Ryazan Oblast, a village in Koldyukovsky Rural Okrug of Kasimovsky District

== Smolensk Oblast ==
As of 2012, eleven rural localities in Smolensk Oblast bear this name:

- Barsuki, Dorogobuzhsky District, Smolensk Oblast, a village in Ushakovskoye Rural Settlement of Dorogobuzhsky District
- Barsuki, Karmanovskoye Rural Settlement, Gagarinsky District, Smolensk Oblast, a village in Karmanovskoye Rural Settlement of Gagarinsky District
- Barsuki, Samuylovskoye Rural Settlement, Gagarinsky District, Smolensk Oblast, a village in Samuylovskoye Rural Settlement of Gagarinsky District
- Barsuki, Monastyrshchinsky District, Smolensk Oblast, a village in Barsukovskoye Rural Settlement of Monastyrshchinsky District
- Barsuki, Ivanovskoye Rural Settlement, Pochinkovsky District, Smolensk Oblast, a village in Ivanovskoye Rural Settlement of Pochinkovsky District
- Barsuki, Stodolishchenskoye Rural Settlement, Pochinkovsky District, Smolensk Oblast, a village in Stodolishchenskoye Rural Settlement of Pochinkovsky District
- Barsuki, Roslavlsky District, Smolensk Oblast, a village in Kostyrevskoye Rural Settlement of Roslavlsky District
- Barsuki, Safonovsky District, Smolensk Oblast, a village in Ignatkovskoye Rural Settlement of Safonovsky District
- Barsuki, Ugransky District, Smolensk Oblast, a village in Vskhodskoye Rural Settlement of Ugransky District
- Barsuki, Vyazemsky District, Smolensk Oblast, a village in Khmelitskoye Rural Settlement of Vyazemsky District
- Barsuki, Yelninsky District, Smolensk Oblast, a village in Mutishchenskoye Rural Settlement of Yelninsky District

== Tula Oblast ==
As of 2012, four rural localities in Tula Oblast bear this name:

- Barsuki, Barsukovsky Rural Okrug, Leninsky District, Tula Oblast, a settlement in Barsukovsky Rural Okrug of Leninsky District
- Barsuki, Khrushchevsky Rural Okrug, Leninsky District, Tula Oblast, a village in Khrushchevsky Rural Okrug of Leninsky District
- Barsuki, Venyovsky District, Tula Oblast, a village in Mordvessky Rural Okrug of Venyovsky District
- Barsuki, Yasnogorsky District, Tula Oblast, a village in Arkhangelskaya Rural Territory of Yasnogorsky District

== Tver Oblast ==
As of 2012, five rural localities in Tver Oblast bear this name:

- Barsuki, Maksatikhinsky District, Tver Oblast, a village in Zarechenskoye Rural Settlement of Maksatikhinsky District
- Barsuki, Torzhoksky District, Tver Oblast, a village in Vysokovskoye Rural Settlement of Torzhoksky District
- Barsuki, Zapadnodvinsky District, Tver Oblast, a village in Ilyinskoye Rural Settlement of Zapadnodvinsky District
- Barsuki, Zharkovskoye Rural Settlement, Zharkovsky District, Tver Oblast, a village in Zharkovskoye Rural Settlement of Zharkovsky District
- Barsuki, Zharkovsky Urban Settlement, Zharkovsky District, Tver Oblast, a settlement under the administrative jurisdiction of Zharkovsky Urban Settlement in Zharkovsky District

== Tyumen Oblast ==
As of 2012, one rural locality in Tyumen Oblast bears this name:

- Barsuki, Tyumen Oblast, a village in Zonovsky Rural Okrug of Yurginsky District

== Vladimir Oblast ==
As of 2012, two rural localities in Vladimir Oblast bear this name:

- Barsuki, Gus-Khrustalny District, Vladimir Oblast, a village in Gus-Khrustalny District
- Barsuki, Melenkovsky District, Vladimir Oblast, a village in Melenkovsky District
