= Kartskhal Malsagov =

18th-century Ingush political leader

- Illustration of Kartskhal based on the monument in Nazran
- Born: 18th century Angusht or Targim
- Died: Early 19th century
- Occupation: Starshina

Kartskhal Ortskhoevich Malsagov (Ingush: Малсаганаькъан Орцха Карцхал; Uorcxa Kharcxal) (Note: The name is recorded with several variants in the literature: Korsal in Gadzhiev 2019, p. 189; Katsyl, Kertsil Ortskhanovich in Malsagov 2005, p. 101; Kertskhal in Martirosian 1933, p. 35; and Kartsal Torgemov in Genko 1930, p. 695.) was an 18th-century Ingush political leader and elder from the Targimkhoy clan. Ingush tradition credits him with establishing a settlement at the confluence of the Sunzha and Nazranka rivers, on the site of the present-day city of Nazran.

== History ==
One of the earliest documented references to Kartskhal was in a record dated 4 December 1786, concerning the interrogation of Ganzhebi, a Chechen elder from the village of Aldy. The record reportedly mentions a Korsal, described as the elder of an Ingush village on the Nazran River. In 1781, L. Shteder observed Ingush watch posts in the area, which were used to warn residents of the Kambileyevka settlements of approaching danger. Following the fortification of the Mozdok–Vladikavkaz line in 1784–1786 and 1803–1804, the Nazran area was firmly occupied by the Ingush, according to the cited historical accounts.

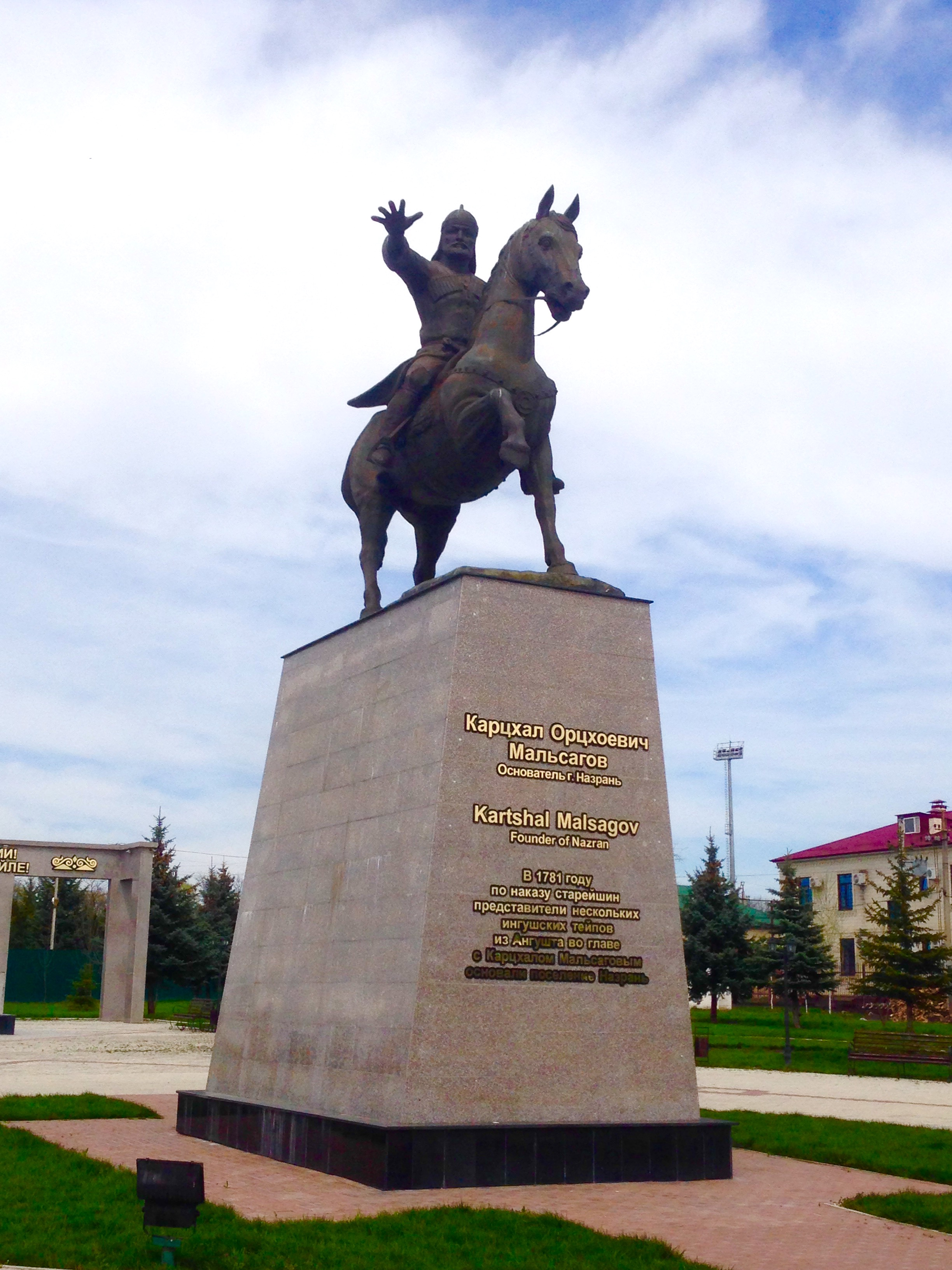
Monument to Kartskhal Malsagov in Nazran

=== Tradition ===
According to researchers writing in the 19th and 20th centuries, Ingush oral tradition holds that in the mid-18th century Kartskhal took ten families bearing the same clan name, together with members of other families, from Angusht and settled on the banks of the Nazranka (Näsyr) and Sunzha rivers.

The Nazran area had reportedly been uninhabited since around 1730, when the Kabardians left it. Before Kartskhal's migration, Kabardians lived nearby in small hamlets. A. Tutaev's account, as quoted by A. Malsagov, relates a conversation in which Prince Nasyr told Kartskhal that the ancestors of the Kabardian princes had been told that the lands had formerly belonged to the Ghalghai (Ingush). The territory was described as extending from the Terek River to Mozdok, then across the Kabardian ridge to Sernovodsk, and onward toward the Assa and Fortanga rivers, Dattykh, Tsecha-Akhki, and Gellam. Nasyr said that most of the princes had decided to leave for Kabarda, although two brothers, Albast and Elzharko, disagreed.

Two Kabardian princes, Albast and Elzharko, were reportedly unwilling to release the Ingush settlers from rent and organized an attack on Kartskhal's settlement in order to seize livestock and agricultural produce. According to Tutaev, as cited by Malsagov, the Ingush, led by Kartskhal, called for assistance from more than 100 armed horsemen from nearby mountain villages and defeated the princes' forces, defending their claim to the land.

A large forest once grew along the Sunzha and Nazranka rivers, with beech, oak, ash, and other trees. Dalgat wrote that the forest later disappeared, partly through local use and mainly through felling by Russian troops. In Tutaev's account, a source of saltpeter on the Sunzha was used by Kartskhal and his people to make gunpowder by mixing it with sulfur and charcoal. They also brought lead-bearing ore from the mountains to make bullets.

The settlement was reportedly subject to raids by Kabardians, Chechens, Nogais, and Kumyks, who seized livestock and food. Kartskhal is said to have built a tall, two-storey wooden watchtower supported by four posts, capable of holding more than one hundred people. A guard was stationed there continuously. A ditch was dug around the settlement, leaving one main gate and a concealed entrance; concealed defensive positions were dug about 50 paces away and along the banks of the Nazranka and Sunzha. The tower served as a defensive strongpoint during a conflict with Chechens who considered the area disputed between themselves and the Kabardians. After the Chechens were defeated and fled, the Ingush pursued them as far as the Nitkhoy stream.

Later, in the late 18th century, Surkho Malsagov moved to the area with his younger son Ovlurg and settled about one and a half versts from the site of the future Nazran Fortress. Surkho began building a stone tower following the architectural traditions of mountainous Ingushetia. It later became known as the Ovlur Tower (Ingush: Овлург-гӀала). According to Albast Tutaev, Surkho began construction and Ovlurg completed the tower in the first decade of the 19th century.

== Legacy ==
Accounts of the Malsagov clan describe Kartskhal as an influential and respected figure among the Ingush. The accounts also portray him as strict toward members of his community: people found guilty of theft were reportedly put in leg stocks and placed in a pit. Kartskhal reportedly lived to the age of 117 and died childless.

A monument to Kartskhal Malsagov was erected in central Nazran in December 2013.

== Bibliography ==
- Albogachiev, M. (2024). "К дате основания первого постоянного ингушского поселения в районе современного г. Назрани" [On the date of foundation of the first permanent Ingush settlement in the area of present-day Nazran]. Исторический журнал: научные исследования [Historical Journal: Scientific Research] (in Russian) (3): 130–148.
- Conquest, Robert (1970). The Nation Killers: The Soviet Deportation of Nationalities. London: Macmillan. p. 222. ISBN 0333105753.
- Dalgat, Bashir (2008). Родовой быт и обычное право чеченцев и ингушей: исследование и материалы 1892–1894 гг [Clan life and customary law of the Chechens and Ingush: research and materials from 1892–1894] (in Russian). Moscow: IMLI RAN. p. 380. ISBN 978-5-9208-0307-8.
- Dolgieva, M.; Kartoev, M. M.; Kodzoev, N. D.; Matiev, T. Kh. (2013). История Ингушетии [History of Ingushetia] (in Russian) (4th ed.). Rostov-on-Don: Yuzhny Izdatelsky Dom. p. 600. ISBN 978-5-98864-056-1.
- Gadzhiev, Z. (2019). "К вопросу о датировке основания города Назрань как ингушского поселения, существующего не менее 250 лет" [On dating the foundation of Nazran as an Ingush settlement existing for at least 250 years]. Вестник Ингушского научно-исследовательского института гуманитарных наук им. Ч. Э. Ахриева [Bulletin of the Ch. E. Akhriev Ingush Research Institute for the Humanities] (in Russian) (2). Magas: 171–191.
- Genko, Anatoly (1930). "Из культурного прошлого ингушей" [From the cultural past of the Ingush]. Записки коллегии востоковедов при Азиатском музее АН СССР [Proceedings of the Board of Orientalists at the USSR Academy of Sciences' Asian Museum] (in Russian). Vol. 5. Leningrad. pp. 681–761.
- Malsagov, A. (2005). Ингуши. Краткая история, их участие в войнах России [The Ingush: A brief history and their participation in Russia's wars] (in Russian). Pyatigorsk: RIA KMV. p. 341. ISBN 5-89314-038-9.
- Martirosian, Georgy (1933). История Ингушии [History of Ingushetia] (in Russian). Ordzhonikidze: Serdalo.
- Yakovlev, Nikolai (1925). Ингуши [The Ingush] (in Russian). Moscow: Tipografiya Gosizdata “Krasny Proletary”. p. 134.
