= Magas, Russia =

New capital city of Ingushetia, Russia

Magas Магас
- Town
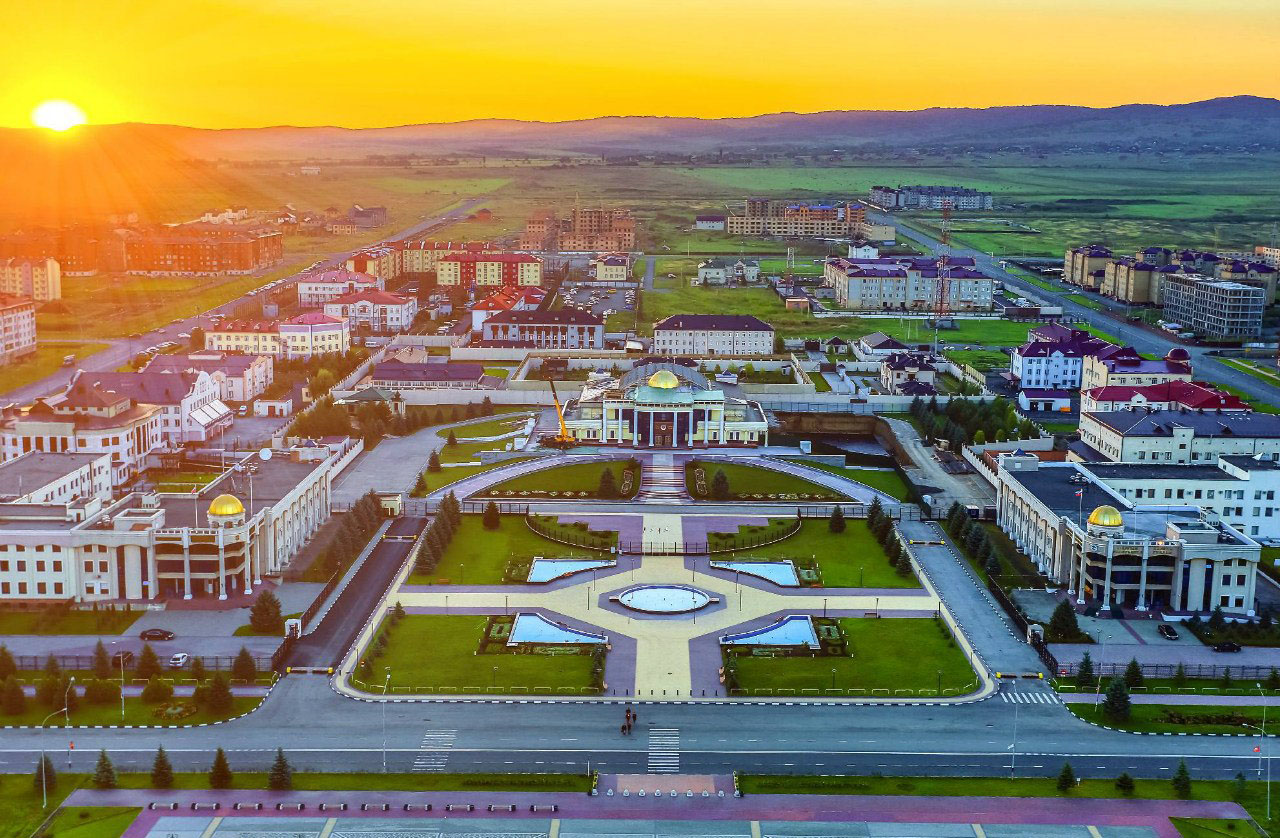
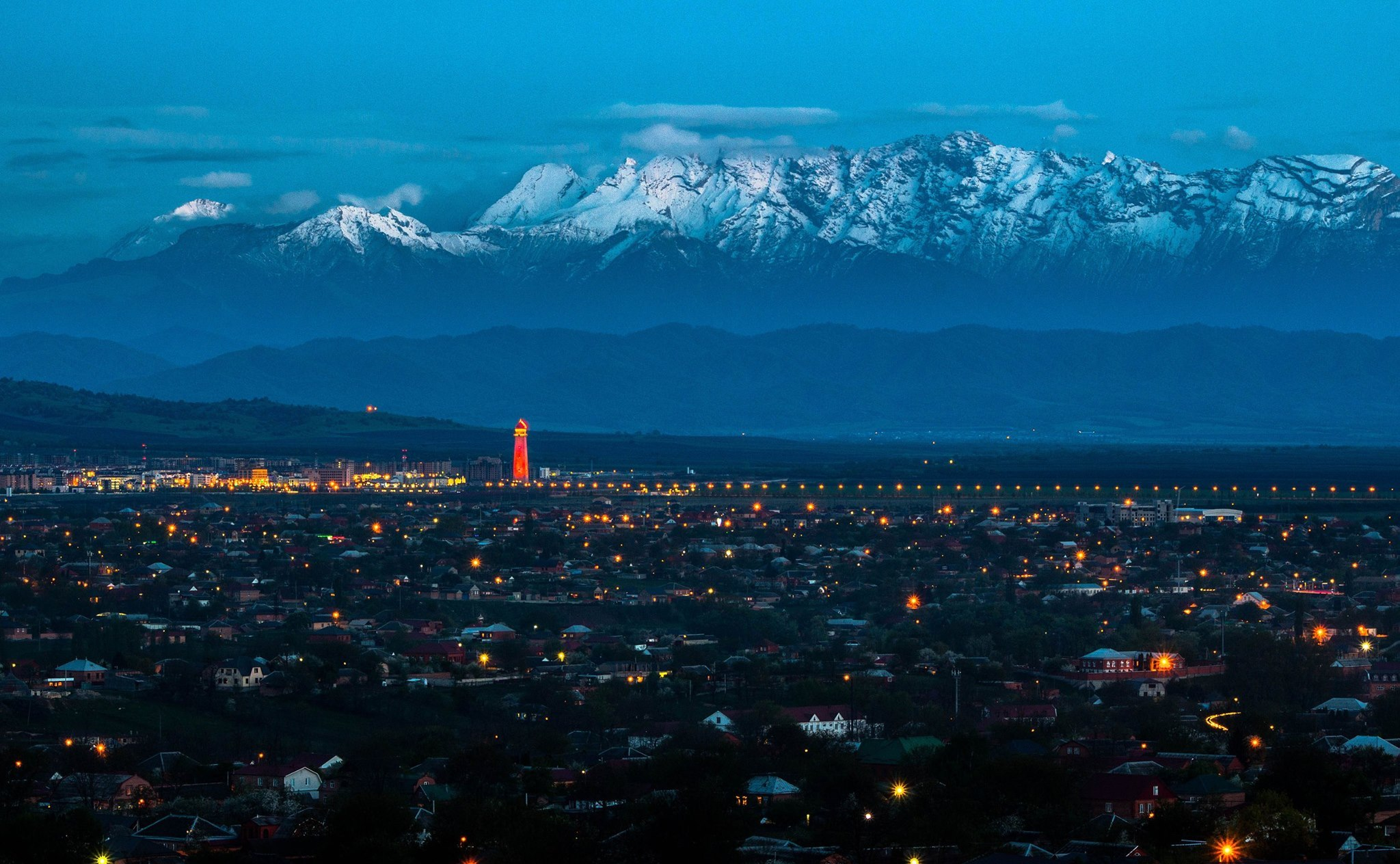
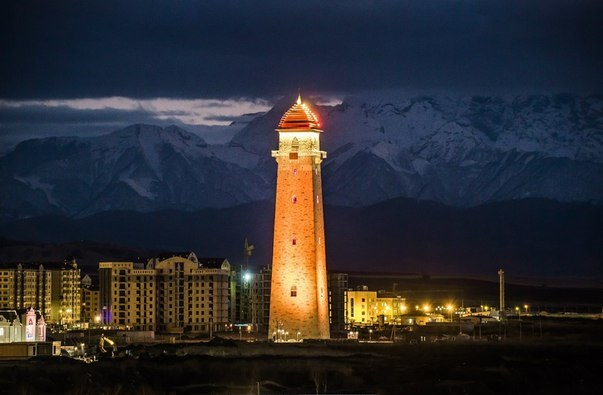
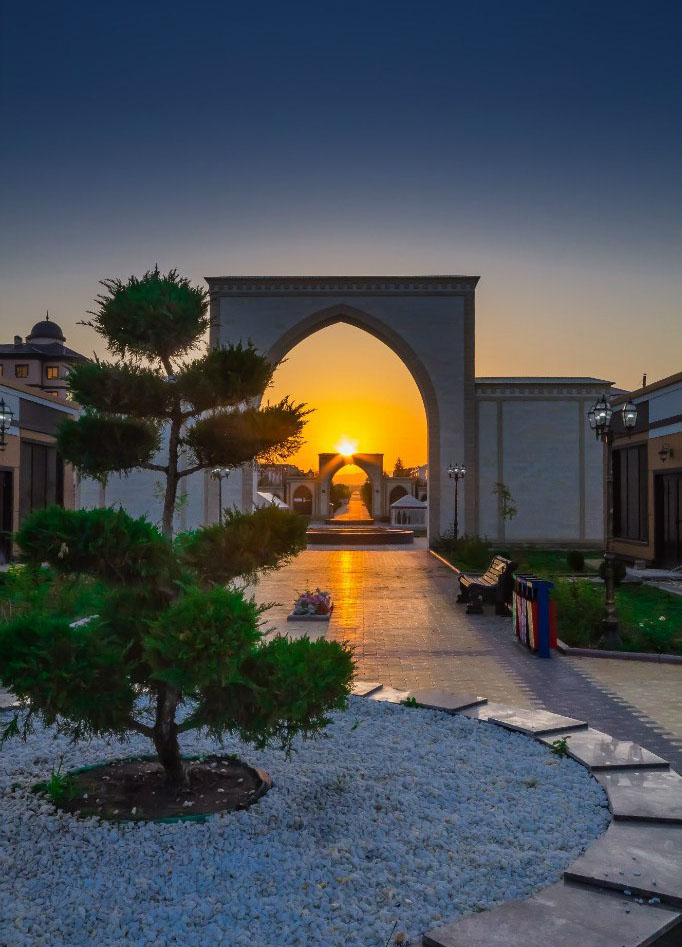
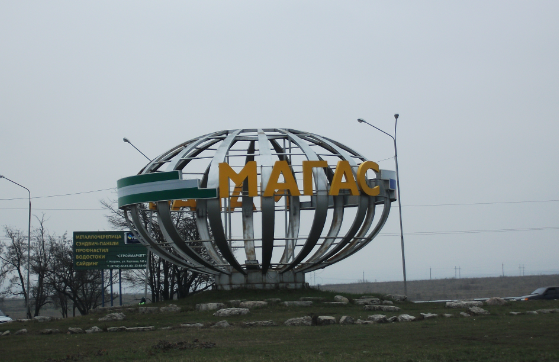
- From the top to bottom-right, View of Central Magas, The City at night, Tower of Concord, Kadyrov Alley, Entrance Sign

- Flag Coat of arms
- Interactive map of Magas
- Location of Magas Magas (European Russia) Magas (Russia) Magas (Europe)
- Coordinates: 43°10′N 44°48′E
- Country: Russia
- Federal subject: Ingushetia
- Founded: 1995
- Town status since: 2000

Government
  - Body: Town Council
  - Mayor: Zayt Ortskhanov

Area
  - Total: 12.6261 km^{2} (4.8750 sq mi)
- Elevation: 200 m (660 ft)

Population (2010 Census)
  - Total: 2,502
  - Estimate (2025): 19,199 (+667.3%)
  - Density: 198.2/km^{2} (513.2/sq mi)

Administrative status
  - Subordinated to: town of republic significance of Magas
  - Capital of: Republic of Ingushetia
  - Capital of: town of republic significance of Magas

Municipal status
  - Urban okrug: Magas Urban Okrug
  - Capital of: Magas Urban Okrug
- Time zone: UTC+3 (MSK)
- Postal code: 386001
- Dialing code: +7 8734
- OKTMO ID: 26701000001
- Website: www.adm-magas.ru

Magas (Russian and Ingush: Магас) is the capital town of Ingushetia, Russia. It was founded in 1995 and replaced Nazran as the capital of the republic in 2002. Due to this distinction, Magas is the smallest capital of a federal subject in Russia. In 2019, it had a population of 8,771 inhabitants, up from 5,841 in 2010 and 272 in 2002.

== History ==
The Republic of Ingushetia came into existence in 1992, having been split from the Chechen–Ingush ASSR. Nazran, the largest of three towns of the new republic, was made a temporary capital.

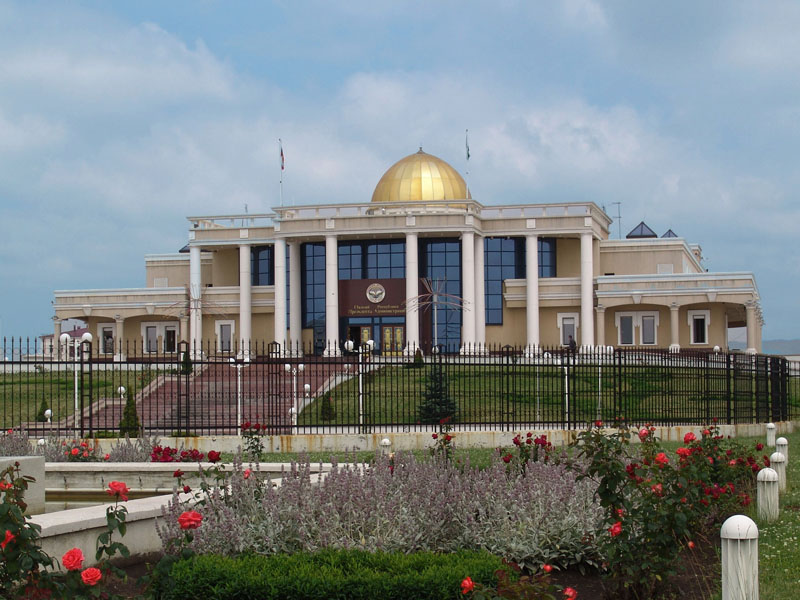
Presidential Palace

In 1995, President Ruslan Aushev founded Magas just a few kilometers south of Nazran, naming it after the medieval city of Maghas. The new town was supposed to serve purely for administrative needs. Magas/Maghas is 28 miles from the frontline for parts of 1942–1943.

It replaced Nazran as capital of the Republic in 2002.

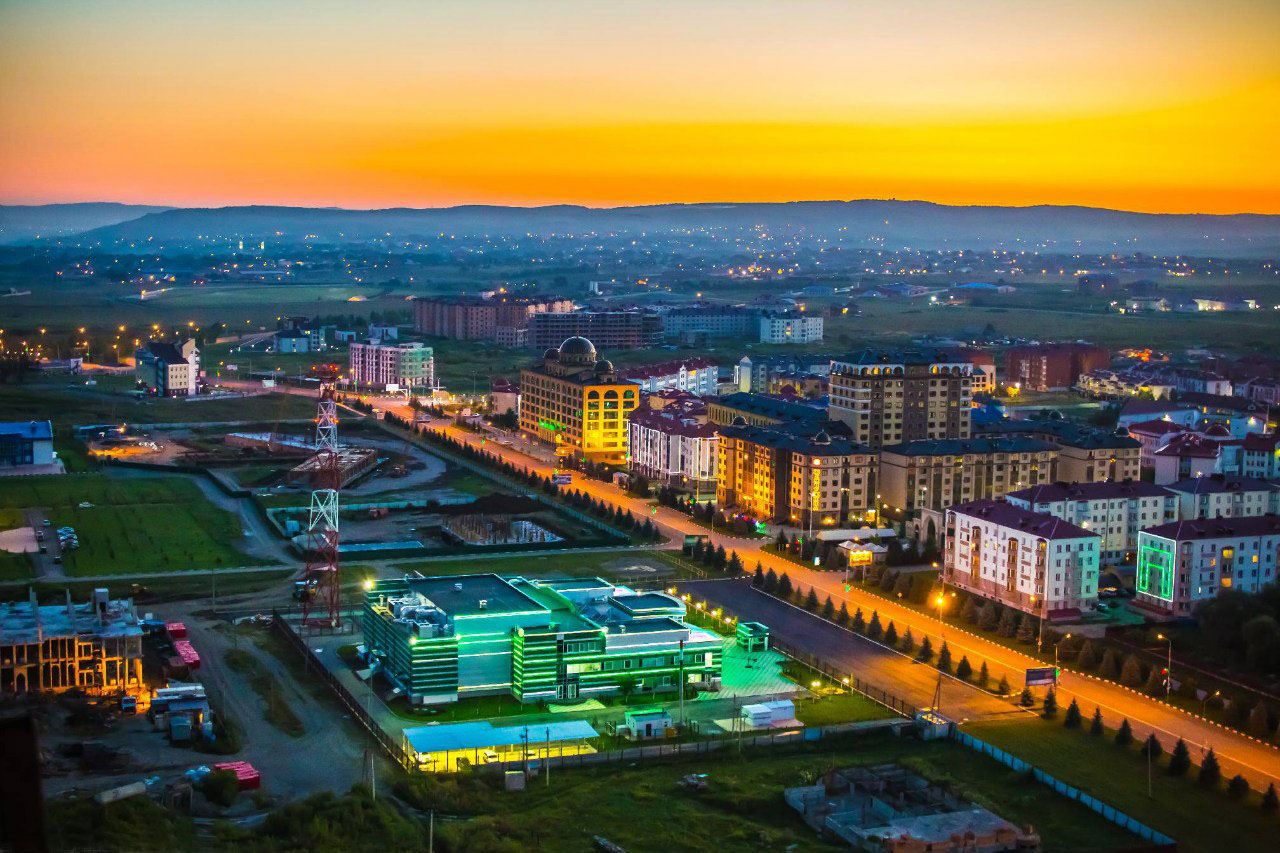
City of Magas from the height of the Consent Tower

The name is given in Persian as Magas or Makas. The name Magas is a homonym of the Persian word magas, meaning "fly", and the medieval writers al-Mas'udi and Juvayni made plays on words about the city's name. The Chinese transcription Muzashan uses the characters for wood (mu, 木) and mountain (shan, 山), which John Latham-Sprinkle interprets as a possible reference to the city's location in rough terrain.

== Geography ==
=== Location ===
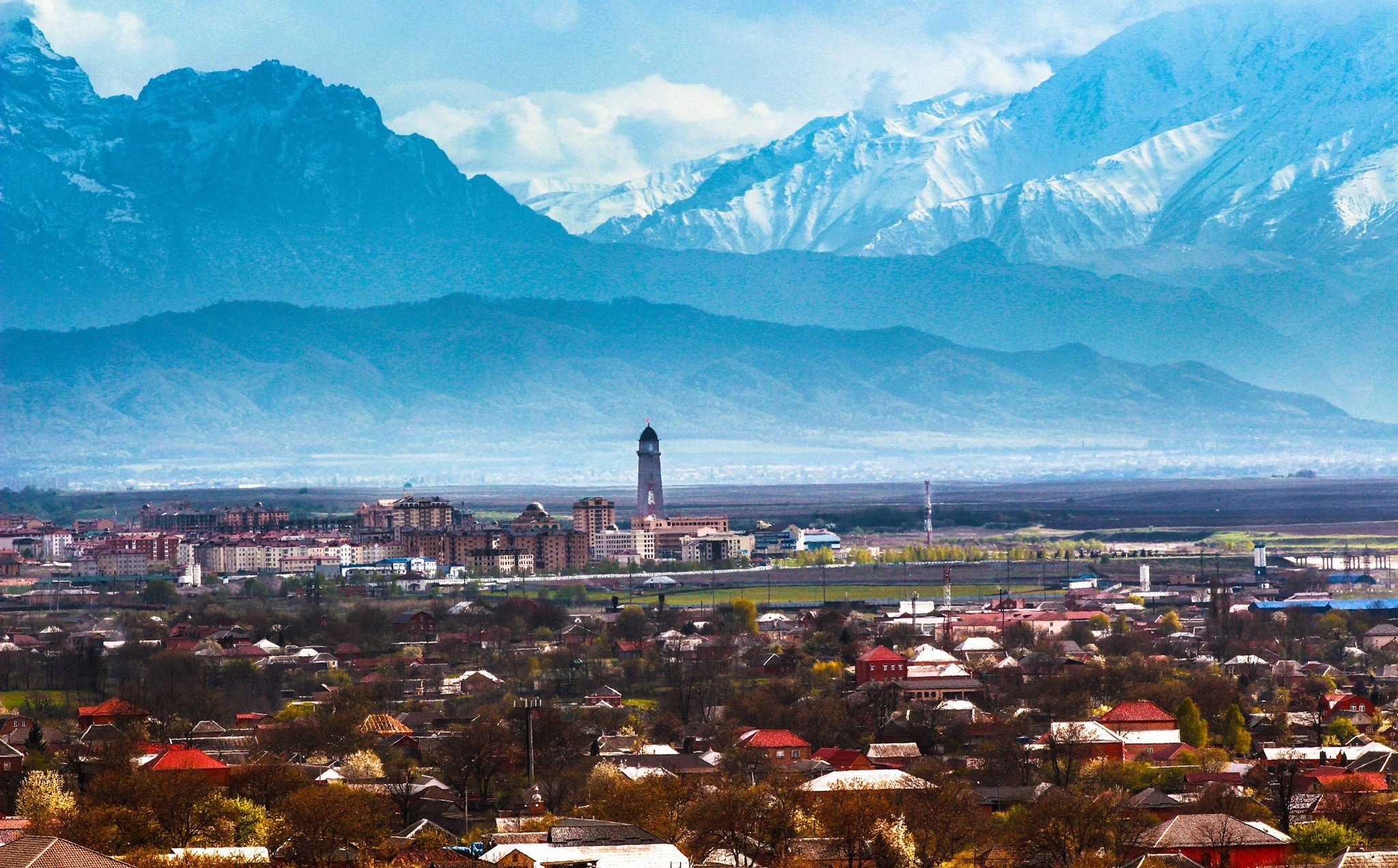
View of Magas

Magas is located in the western area of Ingushetia, at the borders with Prigorodny Raion of North Ossetia-Alania. It is surrounded by Nazranovsky Raion, and the nearest settlements are Ekazhevo, the city of Nazran, and Ali-Yurt. The town is also 30 km from the North Ossetian-Alanian capital city, Vladikavkaz.

=== Administrative and municipal status ===
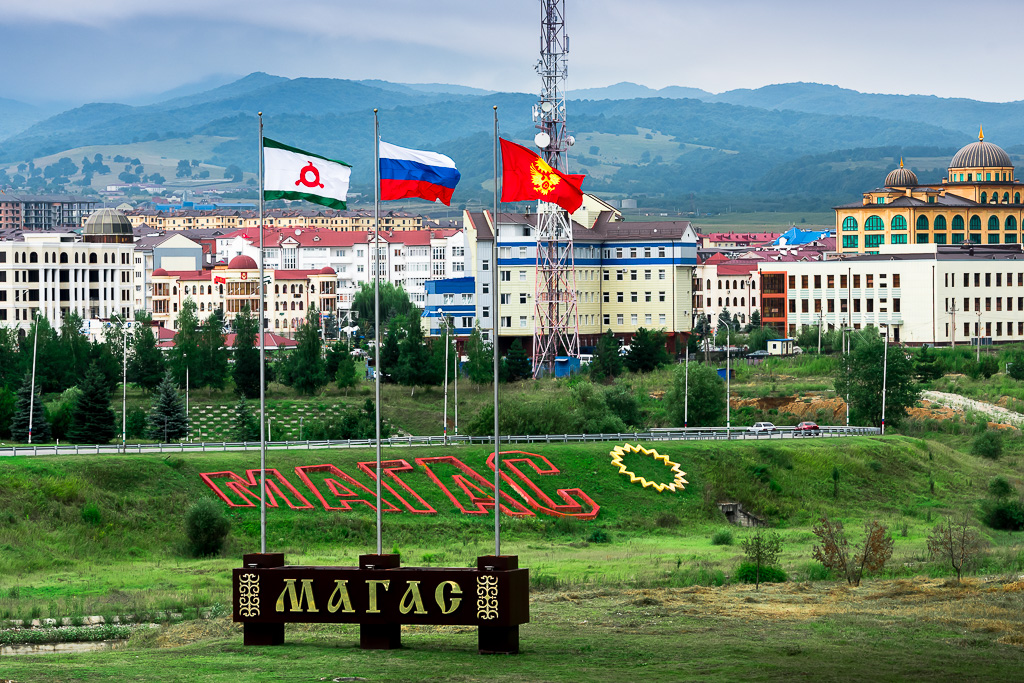
Entrance to Magas

Magas is the capital of the republic. Within the framework of administrative divisions, it is incorporated as the town of republic significance of Magas—an administrative unit with the status equal to that of the districts. As a municipal division, the town of republic significance of Magas is incorporated as Magas Urban Okrug.

=== Climate ===
Magas has a humid continental climate (Köppen climate classification: Dfb) with warm summers and cold winters.

Climate data for Magas
Month	Jan	Feb	Mar	Apr	May	Jun	Jul	Aug	Sep	Oct	Nov	Dec	Year
Mean daily maximum °C (°F)	2.0 (35.6)	3.6 (38.5)	8.3 (46.9)	13.8 (56.8)	18.7 (65.7)	22.8 (73.0)	25.7 (78.3)	26.0 (78.8)	20.7 (69.3)	14.6 (58.3)	8.3 (46.9)	3.7 (38.7)	14.0 (57.2)
Daily mean °C (°F)	−2.3 (27.9)	−0.9 (30.4)	3.4 (38.1)	9.0 (48.2)	14.3 (57.7)	18.5 (65.3)	21.2 (70.2)	21.3 (70.3)	16.4 (61.5)	10.3 (50.5)	3.9 (39.0)	−0.7 (30.7)	9.5 (49.2)
Mean daily minimum °C (°F)	−6.1 (21.0)	−5.0 (23.0)	−1.4 (29.5)	3.8 (38.8)	9.2 (48.6)	13.5 (56.3)	16.2 (61.2)	16.5 (61.7)	12.1 (53.8)	6.3 (43.3)	0.2 (32.4)	−4.3 (24.3)	5.1 (41.2)
Average precipitation mm (inches)	35 (1.4)	37 (1.5)	62 (2.4)	75 (3.0)	102 (4.0)	110 (4.3)	77 (3.0)	70 (2.8)	67 (2.6)	57 (2.2)	42 (1.7)	34 (1.3)	768 (30.2)
Average relative humidity (%)	85	81	75	66	65	63	60	62	66	74	80	85	72
Mean monthly sunshine hours	89.9	93.2	127.1	159	229.4	261	269.7	263.5	213	161.2	93	77.5	2,037.5
Mean daily sunshine hours	2.9	3.3	4.1	5.9	7.4	8.7	8.7	8.5	7.1	5.2	3.1	2.5	5.6
Source: Climate data(1991-2021) Weather2visit

== Demographics ==
Magas' population, with a hundred inhabitants at the beginning, increased in early 2010s.

Population over time
2001	2002	2003	2006	2007	2008	2009	2010	2011	2012	2013	2014	2015
100	275	300	337	338	354	415	2,502	2,581	3,367	4,106	4,756	5,841

== Gallery ==
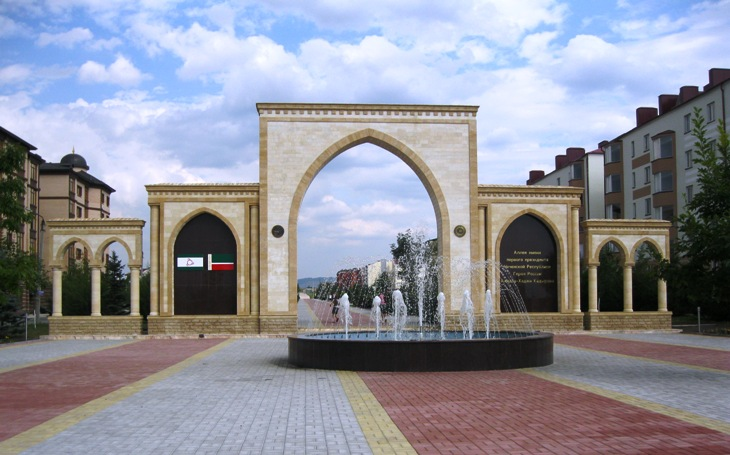
The fountain of "Akhmad Kadyrov Alley"

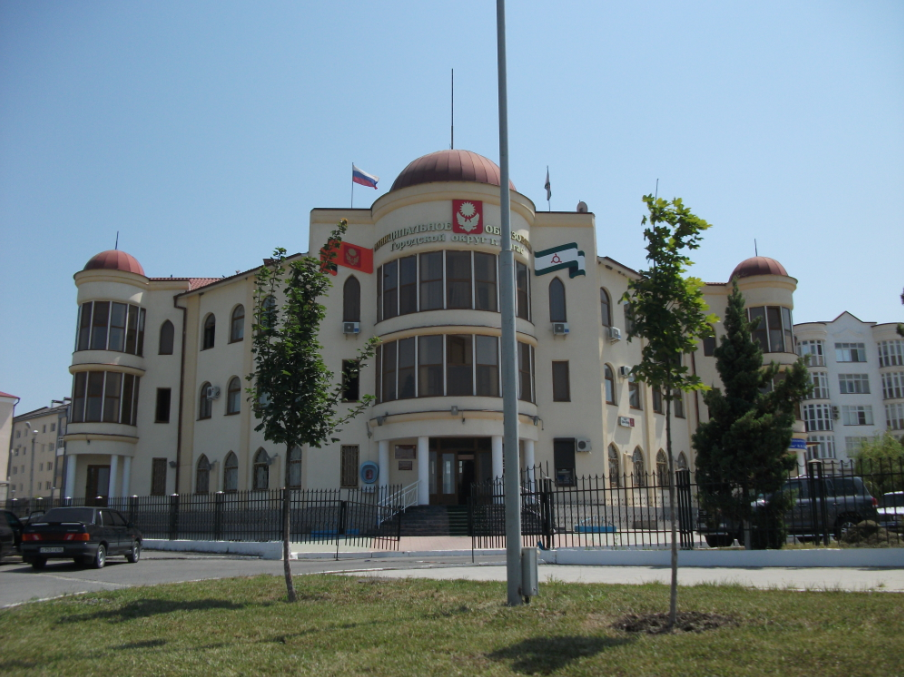
Magas town hall

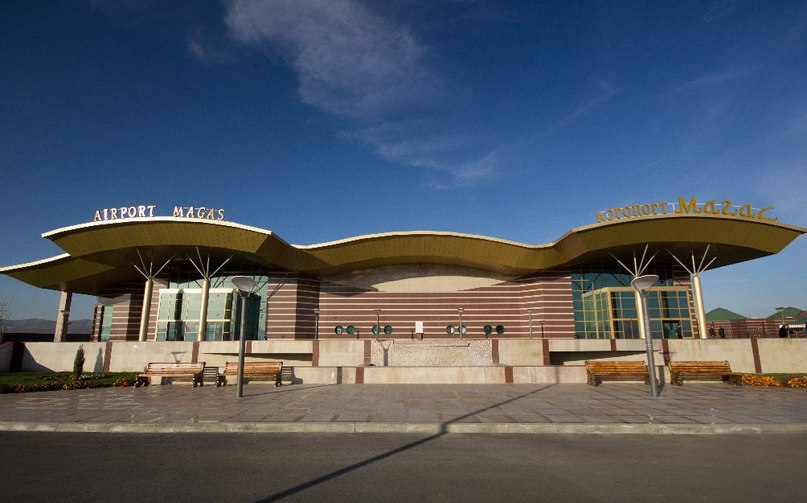
Magas Airport

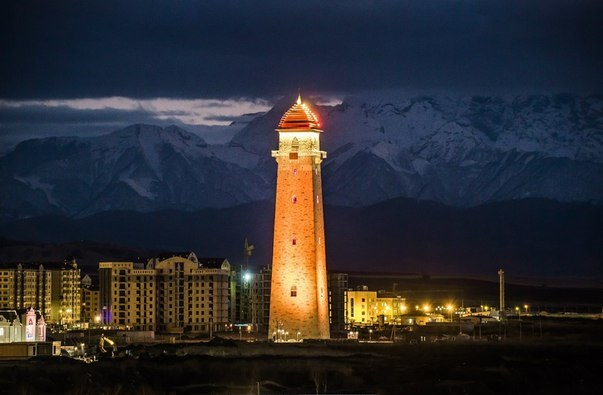
Tower of Concord

== Transport ==
Magas Airport serves the town and the nearby city of Nazran, which is home to the nearest train station.
