= Ekazhevo =

Rural locality in Ingushetia

Ekazhevo Экажево
- Selo

Other transcription(s)
  - Ingush: Экажакъонгий-Юрт (Note: • Commonly mentioned as 'Ekažaqongiy-Yurt' (Ingush: Экажакъонгий-Юрт), however the village was sometimes mentioned as 'Ekkazhe qungiy yurt' (Ingush: Эккаже къунгий йурт) or 'Ekkažaqongiy-Yurt' (Ingush: Эккажакъонгий-Юрт).)
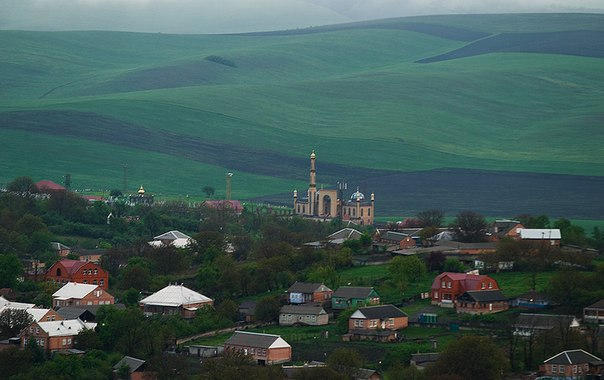
- Interactive map of Ekazhevo
- Location of Ekazhevo Ekazhevo (Republic of Ingushetia)
- Coordinates: 43°12′29″N 44°49′07″E
- Country: Russia
- Federal subject: Ingushetia
- Founded: 1836
- Elevation: 541 m (1,775 ft)

Population (2010 Census)
  - Total: 15 658
  - Estimate (2021): 27 224

Administrative status
  - Subordinated to: Nazranovsky District
- Time zone: UTC+3 (MSK)
- Postal code: 386126
- OKTMO ID: 26605430101

Ekazhevo (Ingush: Экажакъонгий-Юрт, romanized: Ekažaqongiy-Yurt) is a rural locality (a selo) in Nazranovsky District of the Republic of Ingushetia, Russia. It forms the municipality of the rural settlement of Ekazhevo as the only settlement in its composition.

== Geography ==
The village is located on both banks of the Sunzha river, at the confluence of the Konch tributary, opposite the Nasyr-Kort and Gamurzievsky districts of the city of Nazran, with which the village is connected by a road bridge. The capital of the republic, Magas, is located 2 km south of the village, the village of Surkhakhi is 4 km southeast, in the upper reaches of the Konch river.

== History ==
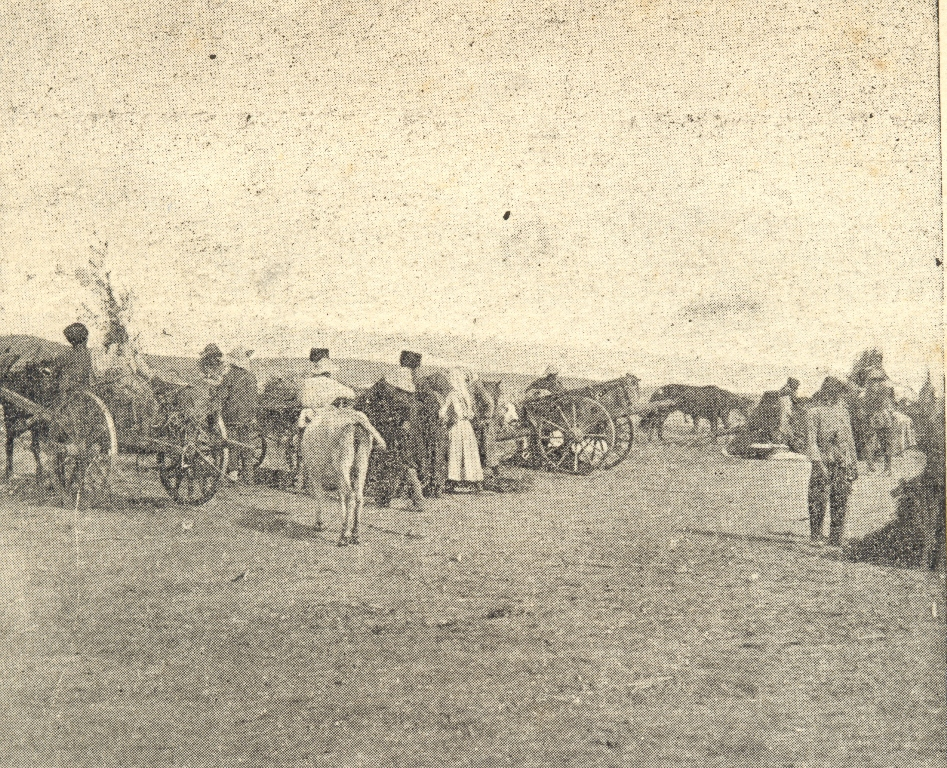
Bazar near the aul of Ekazhevo (1928)

The earliest archaeological sites found in the vicinity of the village of Ekazhevo date back to the Mousterian era in Ingushetia. There is also the "Ekazhevsky settlement" related to the Kuro-Araxes culture (Bronze Age).

Also, the village of Ekazhevo is included in the zone of one of the largest groups of archaeological sites (including Alanian settlements), where, according to some researchers, the medieval Magas, the capital of the Alanian state, which included the territory of modern Ingushetia, could be located.

To date, directly in the village of Ekazhevo, archaeologists have recorded: on the eastern outskirts of the village — "Ekazhevsky settlement No. 1 Achamza-boarz" ("Acham-boarz"); 50 m from the settlement "Achamza-boarz" — "Ekazhevsky settlement No. 2"; 2.5 km northeast of the village — "Ekazhevsky settlement No. 3".

The village of Ekazhevo (Ingush: Эккажакъонгий-Юрт, Ekažaqongiy-Yurt) is translated literally as "the village of the sons of Ekazh", the first settlers of which were representatives of the Ekazhev family, says Ph.D. Alimbek Kurkiev in the book "On some toponymic names of planar Ingushetia".

From 1944 to 1958, during the period of the deportation of Chechens and Ingush and the abolition of the Chechen-Ingush Autonomous Soviet Socialist Republic, the village was called Novo-Ardonskoye (Novoardonskoye, Novy Ardon).

At various times, such leaders as Shamil Basayev and Said Buryatsky were killed in the village itself and in its environs. The special operation carried out in the village was the subject of a number of extensive articles in the human rights press in Russia and the CIS.

== Infrastructure ==
There are 6 comprehensive schools in Ekazhevo. The largest potato farm in the republic.

== Notable people ==
- Artagan Albogachiev — deputy of the Supreme Soviet of the Chechen-Ingush Autonomous Soviet Socialist Republic, delegate to the Congress of the Communist Party of the Soviet Union, Hero of Socialist Labour.
- Issa Kostoyev — State Counselor of Justice 2nd class, investigator, known for the capture of the serial killer Andrei Chikatilo.
- Abubukar Kostoyev — police colonel, Hero of the Russian Federation
- Khizir Khadziev — abrek, national hero of the Ingush.

== Bibliography ==
- Uzhakhov, M. G. (1927). Ингушско-русский словарик [Ingush-Russian Dictionary] (in Ingush and Russian). Vladikavkaz: Kraynatsizdat. pp. 1–185.
- Барахоева, Н. М.; Кодзоев, Н. Д.; Хайров, Б. А. (2016). Ингушско-русский словарь терминов [Ingush-Russian dictionary of terms] (in Ingush and Russian) (2 ed.). Нальчик: ООО «Тетраграф». pp. 1–288.
- Кодзоев, Н. Д. (2021). Хайрова, Р. Р. (ed.). Русско-ингушский словарь [Russian-Ingush dictionary] (in Ingush and Russian). Ростов-на-Дону: Типография «Лаки Пак». pp. 1–656. ISBN 978-5-906785-55-8.
- Мальсагов, З. К. (1963). Оздоева, Ф. (ed.). Грамматика ингушского языка [Grammar of the Ingush language] (in Ingush and Russian). Vol. 5 (2nd ed.). Грозный: Чечено-Ингушское Книжное Издательство. pp. 1–164.
- Оздоев, И. А. (1980). Оздоева, Ф. Г.; Куркиев, А. С. (eds.). Русско-ингушский словарь: 40 000 слов [Russian-Ingush dictionary: 40,000 words] (in Ingush and Russian). Москва: Русский язык. pp. 1–832.
- Долгиева, М. Б.; Картоев, М. М.; Кодзоев, Н. Д.; Мамиев, Т. Х. (2013). История Ингушетии (in Russian) (4 ed.). Ростов-на-Дону: Южный издательский дом. pp. 1–600. ISBN 978-5-98864-056-1.
- Кодзоев, Н. Д. (2001). "Местонахождение и значение названия аланской столицы города Магас" [Location and meaning of the name of the Alanian capital city of Magas]. Вестник Археологического центра (in Russian) (1). Назрань: 43–52.
