= Kambileyevka =

River in North Ossetia–Alania, Russia

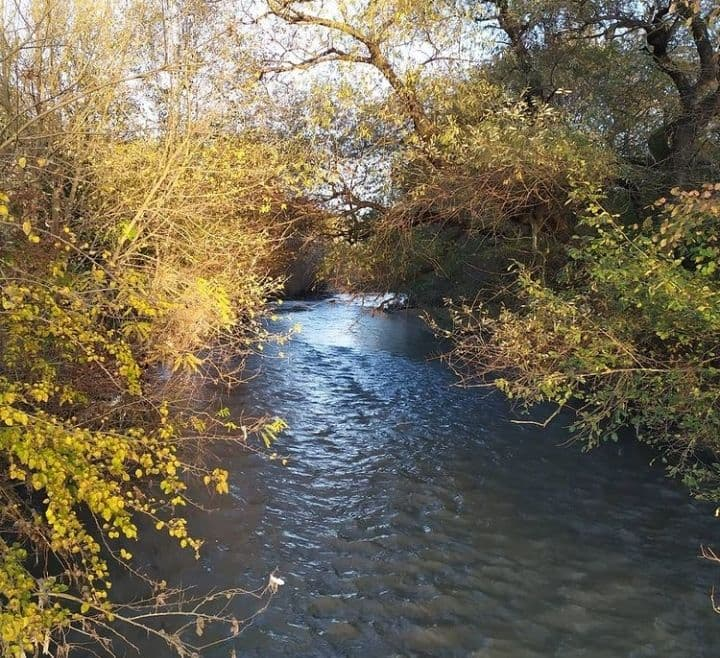

- Location within North Ossetia–Alania Location within Caucasus Mountains Location within European Russia

Location
- Country: North Ossetia–Alania (Russia)

Physical characteristics
- Source
  - location: Caucasus Mountains
- Mouth: Terek
  - coordinates: 43.2664°N 44.2712°E
- Length: 99 km (62 mi)
- Basin size: 954 km^{2} (368 sq mi)

Basin features
- Progression: Terek→ Caspian Sea

The Kambileyevka (Iron Ossetic: Хуымæллæджы дон, romanized: Xwymællæĝy don, Ingush: Гӏалми, romanized: Ghalmi, Russian: Камбилеевка) is a river of North Ossetia–Alania in southwestern Russia. It is a right tributary of the Terek. The river is 99 kilometres (62 mi) long, with a drainage basin of 954 square kilometres (368 mi^{2}).
