= Nazran =

Former capital city in Ingushetia, Russia

Nazran Назрань
- City

Other transcription(s)
  - Ingush: Наьсаре
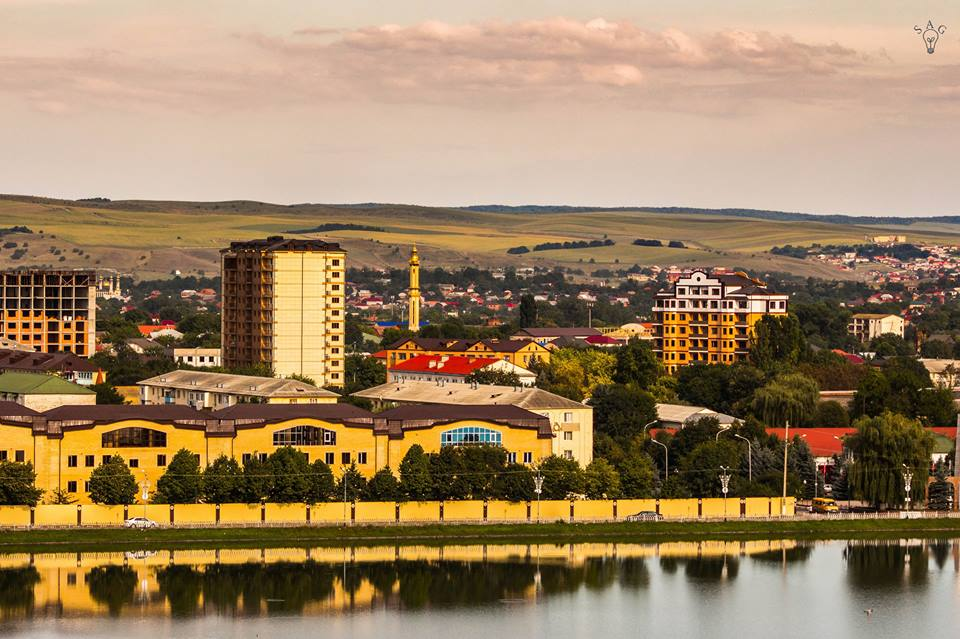
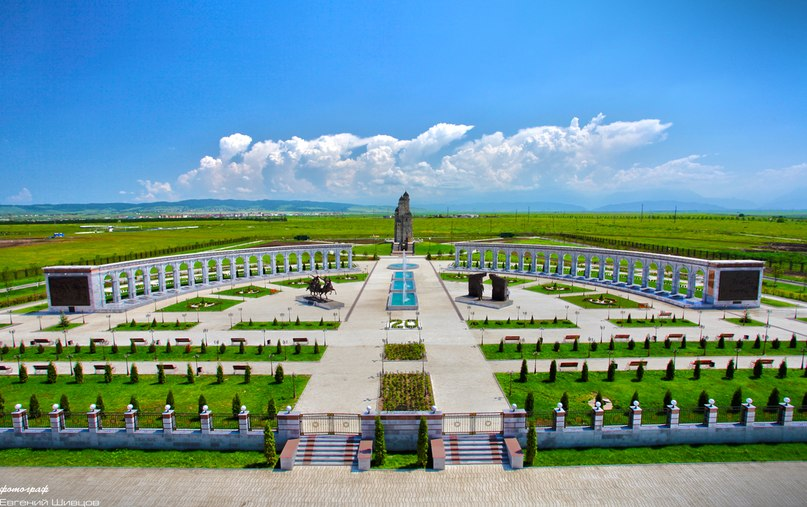
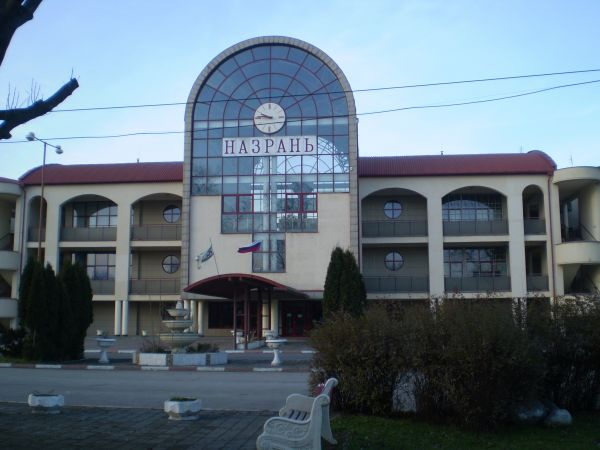
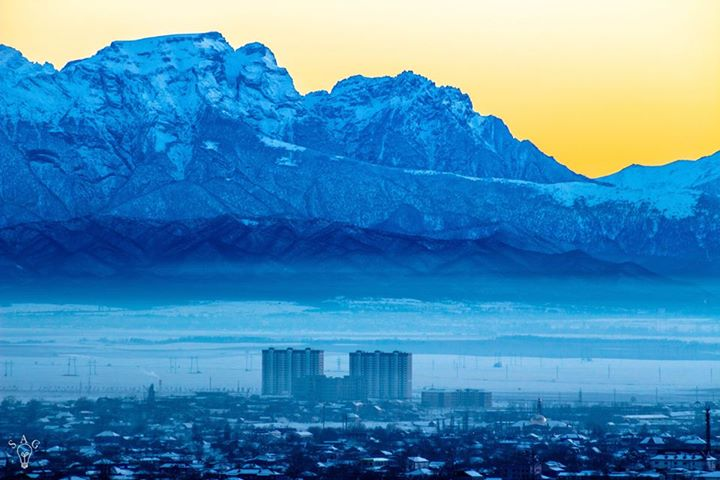
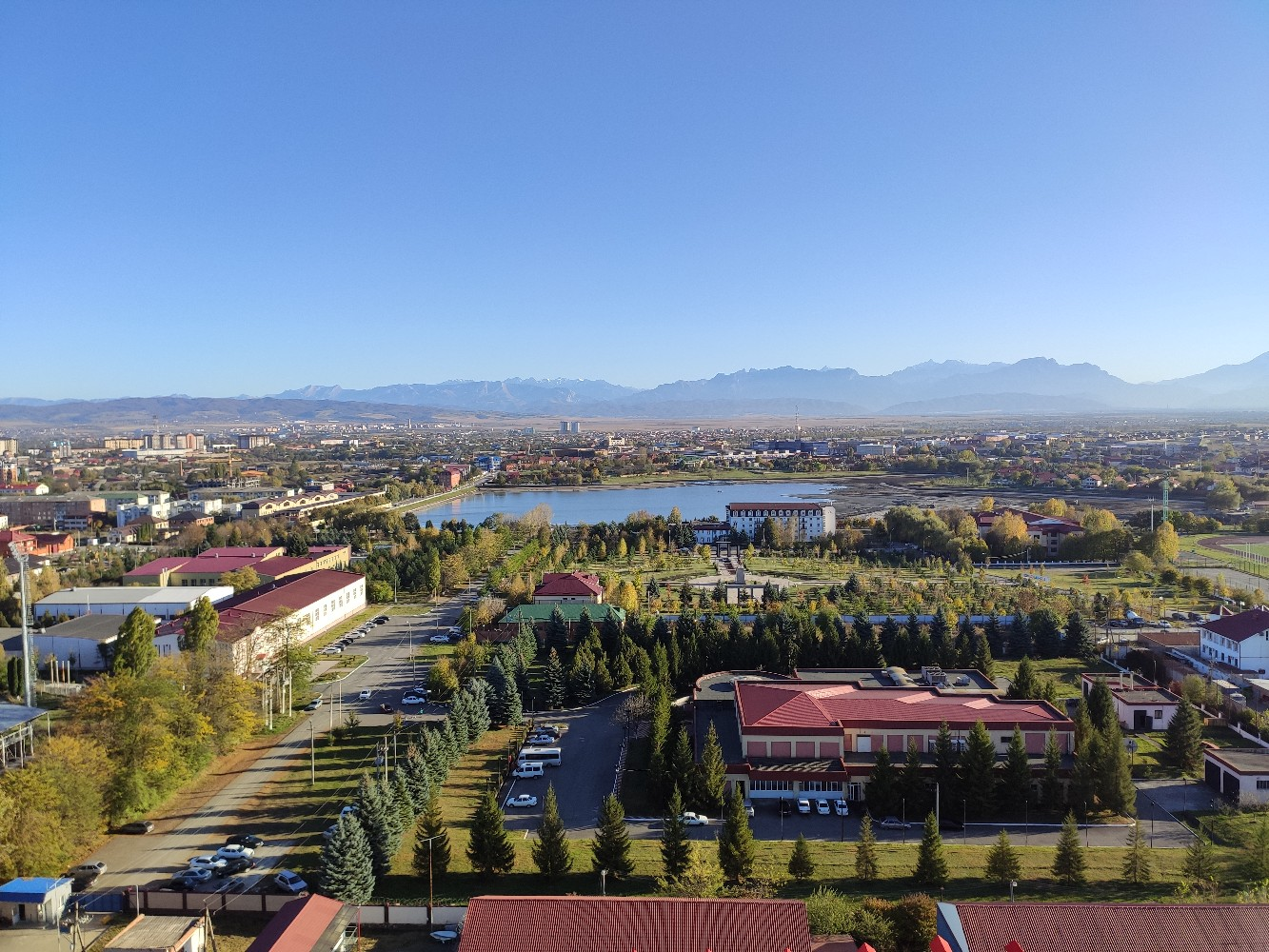
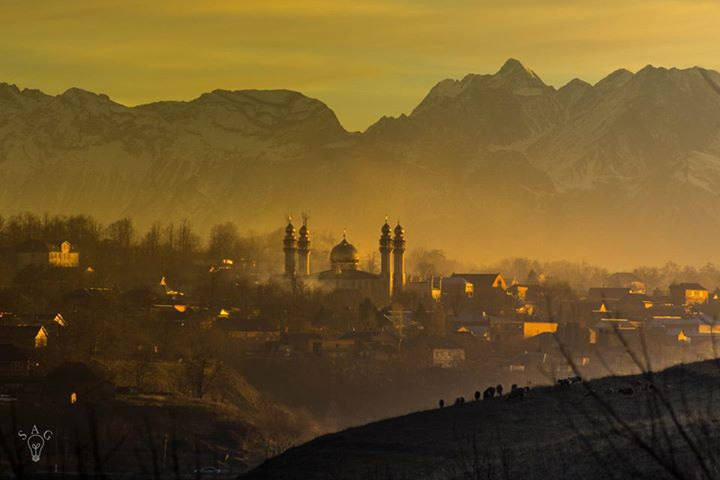
- Skyline of the town from the side of the Nazran pond Memorial of memory and glory Nazran Train Station A view of the Matt-loam from the side of Nazran The Zavodskoy raion of Nazran Gamurzievo

- Flag Coat of arms
- Interactive map of Nazran
- Location of Nazran Nazran (Republic of Ingushetia)
- Coordinates: 43°13′N 44°46′E
- Country: Russia
- Federal subject: Ingushetia
- Founded: 1781 (Note: The official founding date of Nazran considered 1781 which is based on the fact that Russian officer L. L. Shteder mentioned the Ingush post on a high cape between the Sunzha and Nazranka rivers in that year. The decision on this historical determination of the date of the founding of the city was made at the conference held by the Nazran city administration on July 15, 2000. However the aul Nazran has been mentioned earlier as Nasranova in the year 1774 on the map "Carte de la partie septentrionale de l'empire otoman" made by Giovanni Antonio Rizzi Zannoni. Overall, in the documents of 1780s, there has been mentioned various times about an Ingush village on the Nazranka river as well as the mention of the Nazran by its name.)
- City status since: 1967

Government
  - Head: Uruskhan Evloev

Area
  - Total: 80 km^{2} (31 sq mi)
- Elevation: 200 m (660 ft)

Population (2010 Census)
  - Total: 93,335
  - Estimate (2024): 126,292 (+35.3%)
  - Rank: 183rd in 2010
  - Density: 1,200/km^{2} (3,000/sq mi)

Administrative status
  - Subordinated to: city of republic significance of Nazran
  - Capital of: Nazranovsky District, city of republic significance of Nazran

Municipal status
  - Urban okrug: Nazran Urban Okrug
  - Capital of: Nazran Urban Okrug, Nazranovsky Municipal District
- Time zone: UTC+3 (MSK)
- Postal codes: 386100–386106, 386700, 386899
- Dialing code: +7 87322
- OKTMO ID: 26706000001
- Website: www.nazrangrad.ru

Nazran (Russian: Назра́нь; Ingush: Наьсаре, romanized: Näsare) is the largest city in Ingushetia, Russia. It served as the republic's capital from 1991 to 2000, until it was replaced by Magas, which was built for this purpose. It is the most populous city in the republic, with a population of 122,350 in the 2021 census.

== Etymology ==
The name of the town, possibly, derives from the name of the legendary first settler Nyasar (Ingush: Наьсар, also referred as Närt-Näsar Ingush: Наьрт-Наьсар, lit. 'Hero Näsar'). (Note: Alimbek Kurkiev who held this point of view, did not rule out the possibility of certain connection of 'Nazran' with the mineral water Narzan, found in present-day Stavropol Krai, or with the Kabardian name of Kislovodsk, Nartsanē/Nartsana (Kabardian: Нарцанэ/Нартсана).)

The town is associated by Leonid Lavrov with the Arabic word "al nasaraa" (النصارى), (Note: In Russian transliteration of Leonid Lavrov насрāнӣй.) meaning "Christian", because supposedly Christianity held on for longer in Nazran than in other neighboring places in Ingushetia. Lavrov said that Muslims were already present here in 1405–1406. Vladimir Markovin also stated that the name of Nazran has an Arabic origin while quoting Lavrov. (Note: Markovin used this as one of the arguments that the spread Christianity by Georgians had strong influence on Chechens and Ingush, in particularly their culture and language.)

== History ==
=== 18th–20th centuries ===
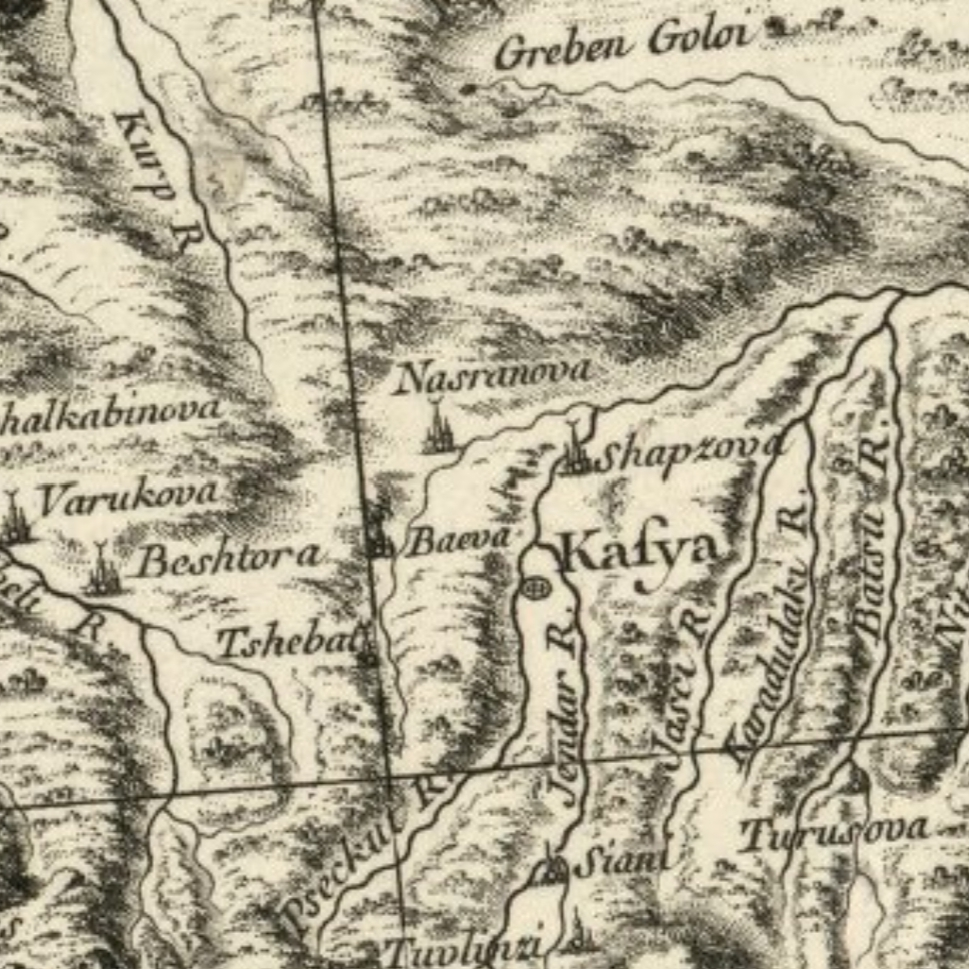
“Nasranova” (Nazran) on a detail of Giovanni Antonio Rizzi Zannoni’s Carte de la partie septentrionale de l'empire otoman, published in 1774.

The aul of Nazran was founded in the late 18th century. According to accounts recorded by researchers in the 19th and 20th centuries, the establishment of Nazran is traditionally attributed to Kartskhal Malsagov, an Ingush elder (starshina) and political leader of the Targimkhoy clan. Drawing on Ingush oral tradition, these accounts relate that, in the mid-18th century, Kartskhal led ten families of his clan, together with members of other families, from Angusht to the banks of the Nazranka and Sunzha rivers, where they established a settlement on the site of present-day Nazran.

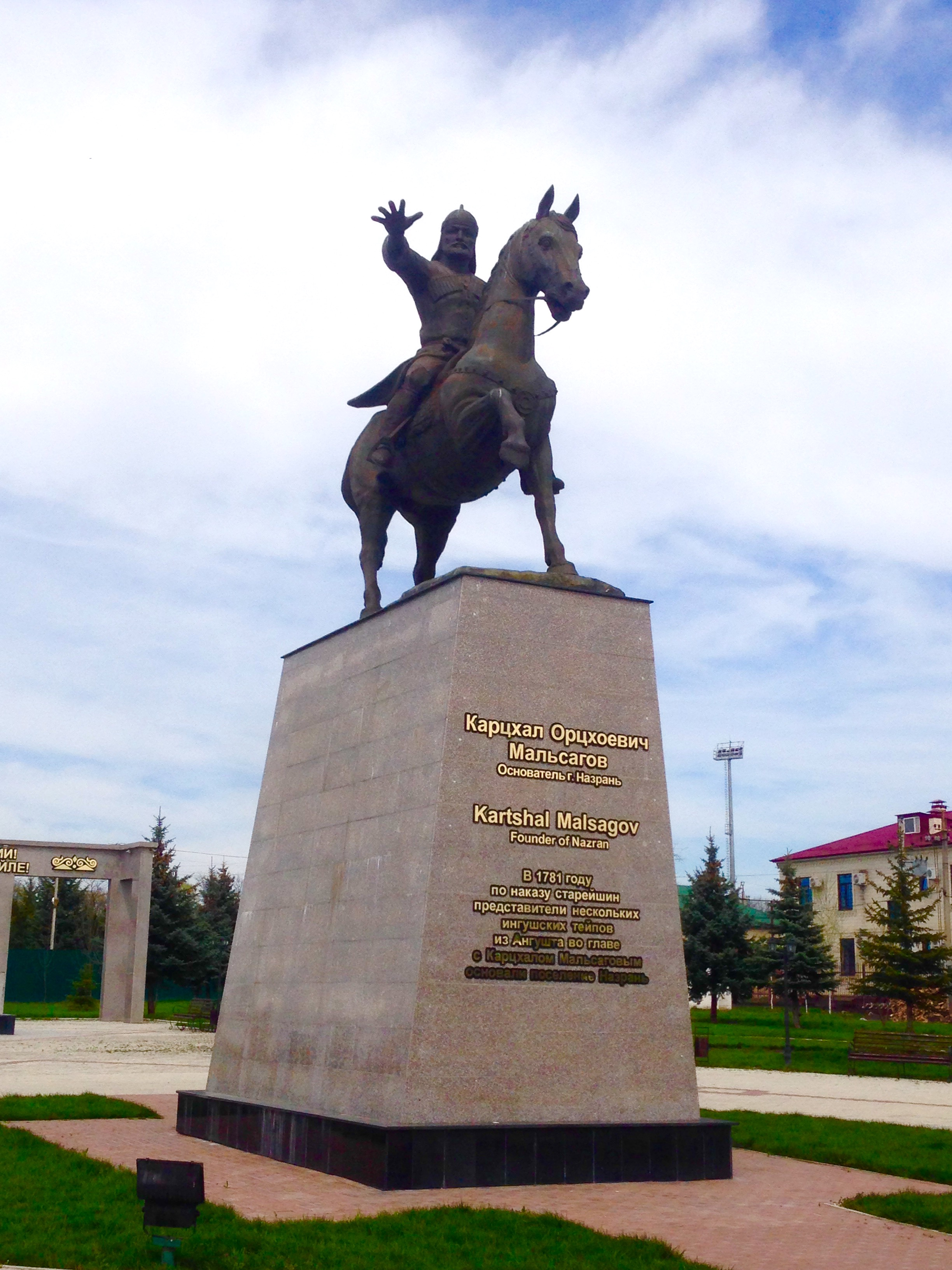
Monument to Kartskhal Malsagov, the founder of Nazran

The official date of the founding of Nazran is considered 1781. This is based on the report of L. Shteder, who during his expedition to Caucasus in 1781, noticed Ingush outposts on the river of Nazranka.

A Russian military fortress was founded in Nazran in 1817. In 1858, Nazran became the center of a major uprising by the Ingush people against the Russian Empire during the Caucasian War. The revolt was sparked by Russian policies aimed at forcibly consolidating small Ingush settlements into larger villages, along with restrictions on local customs and the confiscation of Ingush lands. In May, thousands of Ingush rebels attempted to capture the Nazran Fortress but were repelled by Imperial troops. By August 1858, the uprising had been suppressed, and many of its leaders were executed or exiled.

Nazran was granted town status in 1967.

During the Russian Empire, the settlement was the administrative capital of the Nazranovsky Okrug of the Terek Oblast. During the Soviet period, Nazran was the administrative center of Nazranovsky District within the Chechen–Ingush Autonomous Soviet Socialist Republic. After the Republic of Ingushetia and the Chechen Republic were separated in 1991, the town became the republic's capital. This brought about a sharp increase in population: while counting 18,246 inhabitants according to the 1989 Census, during the 2002 Census Nazran had as many as 125,056 inhabitants.

=== 21st century ===
==== 2004 rebel raid on Nazran ====
In 2004, a group of Chechen and Ingush militants carried out a large-scale raid on Ingushetia, led by Shamil Basayev. The overnight attacks targeted fifteen official buildings in Nazran, and at least three towns and villages located on the Baku-Rostov highway that crosses the republic from east to west.

The raid lasted nearly five hours, and the assailants – said to number 200 to 300 – withdrew almost unscathed; the raiders apparently lost only two men during the attacks. The rebels killed 67 members of security forces, including the republic's Interior Minister Abukar Kostoyev, his deputy Zyaudin Kotiev, top prosecutors, and other officials; they also captured and looted the MVD's armory and police depots. 25 civilians, including a local United Nations worker, were killed in the crossfire.

Federal Interior Minister Rashid Nurgaliyev met with General Vyacheslav Tikhomirov, the commander of Russia's Interior Ministry forces, and blamed them for the high number of deaths. Tikhomirov decided to resign after the meeting.

==== 2008 protests ====
Widespread protests erupted in January 2008, with a strong government response. The disturbances appear to have been fueled by heavy-handed government and para-military activity, including abductions, arrests and murders. Protesters demanded the resignation of President Zyazikov.

==== 2009 bombing ====
In August 2009, a suicide bomber drove a truck filled with explosives into the Nazran police headquarters. Russian news agencies reported that 25 were killed in the attack, and roughly 140 were wounded. It is believed that more bodies may still be in the rubble, yet to be found. The police headquarters was completely destroyed in the attack, including up to 30 police vehicles and munition stores.

== Geography ==
=== Location ===
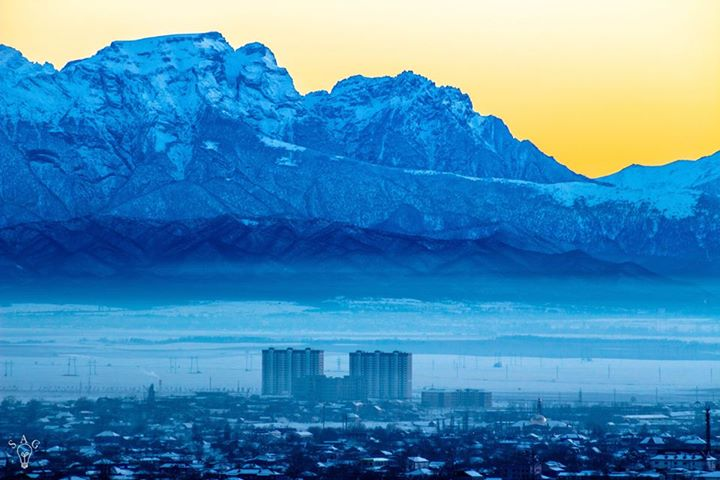
View of Nazran

Nazran is located in the western area of Ingushetia, at the borders with Prigorodny Raion of North Ossetia-Alania. It also borders the raion of Nazranovsky; and the nearest settlements are Ekazhevo, the new town of Magas, and Barsuki. It is 27 km from the North Ossetian-Alanian capital city, Vladikavkaz, 19 from Karabulak and 54 from Malgobek.

=== Administrative and municipal status ===
Within the framework of administrative divisions, Nazran serves as the administrative center of Nazranovsky District, even though it is not a part of it. As an administrative division, it is incorporated separately as the city of republic significance of Nazran—an administrative unit with the status equal to that of the districts. As a municipal division, the city of republic significance of Nazran is incorporated as Nazran Urban Okrug.

=== Climate ===
Nazran has a humid continental climate (Köppen climate classification: Dfb).

Climate data for Nazran
| Month | Jan | Feb | Mar | Apr | May | Jun | Jul | Aug | Sep | Oct | Nov | Dec | Year |
|---|---|---|---|---|---|---|---|---|---|---|---|---|---|
| Mean daily maximum °C (°F) | 2.0 (35.6) | 3.6 (38.5) | 8.3 (46.9) | 13.8 (56.8) | 18.7 (65.7) | 22.8 (73.0) | 25.7 (78.3) | 26.0 (78.8) | 20.7 (69.3) | 14.6 (58.3) | 8.3 (46.9) | 3.7 (38.7) | 14.0 (57.2) |
| Daily mean °C (°F) | −2.3 (27.9) | −0.9 (30.4) | 3.4 (38.1) | 9.0 (48.2) | 14.3 (57.7) | 18.5 (65.3) | 21.2 (70.2) | 21.3 (70.3) | 16.4 (61.5) | 10.3 (50.5) | 3.9 (39.0) | −0.7 (30.7) | 9.5 (49.2) |
| Mean daily minimum °C (°F) | −6.1 (21.0) | −5.0 (23.0) | −1.4 (29.5) | 3.8 (38.8) | 8.3 (46.9) | 13.5 (56.3) | 16.3 (61.3) | 16.5 (61.7) | 12.1 (53.8) | 6.3 (43.3) | 0.2 (32.4) | −4.3 (24.3) | 5.0 (41.0) |
| Average precipitation mm (inches) | 35 (1.4) | 37 (1.5) | 62 (2.4) | 75 (3.0) | 102 (4.0) | 110 (4.3) | 77 (3.0) | 70 (2.8) | 67 (2.6) | 57 (2.2) | 42 (1.7) | 34 (1.3) | 768 (30.2) |

== Transportation ==
Nazran is located on the M29 federal highway and has a railway station on the Rostov-on-Don–Baku line. Magas Airport serves the city and the near town of Magas.

== Sport ==
FC Angusht Nazran is the city's association football club. Its home ground is the Rashid Aushev Central Stadium.

== Twin cities ==
- Kislovodsk, Russia.

== Gallery ==
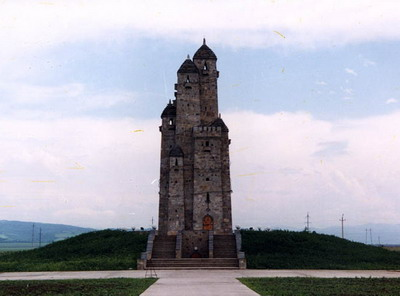
Memorial for the memory of victims of political oppressions in Nazran

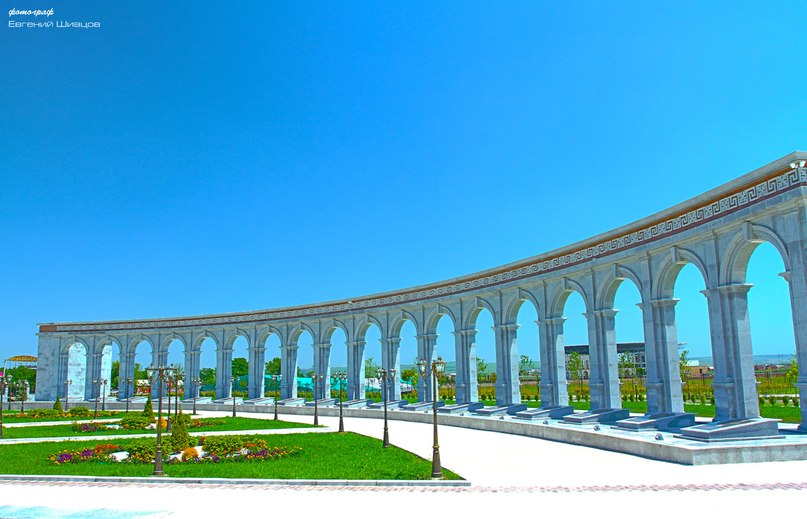
Memorial of Remembrance and Glory

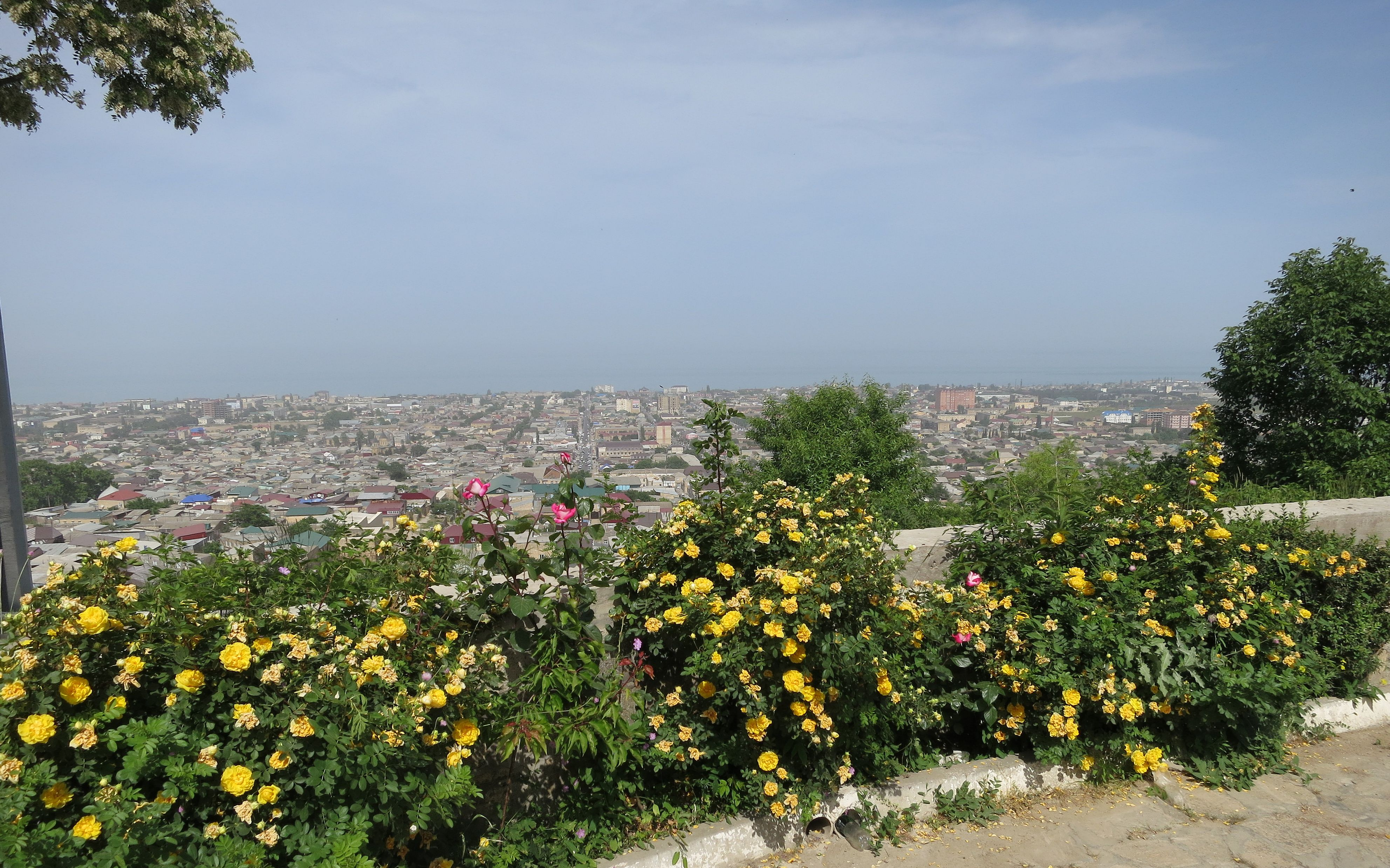
Panoramic view

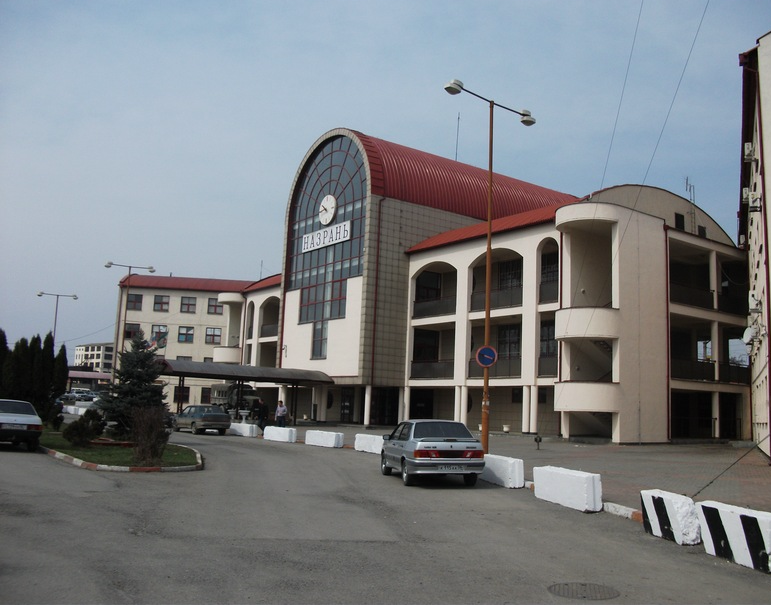
Railway station building

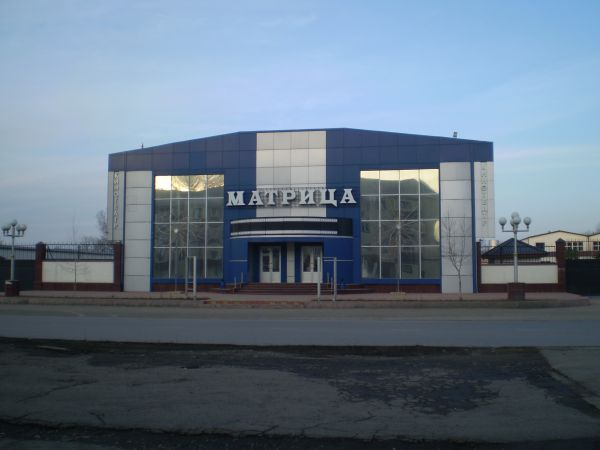
Cinema "Matritsa"

== Bibliography ==
=== English sources ===
- Conquest, Robert (1970). The Nation Killers: The Soviet Deportation of Nationalities. London: Macmillan. p. 222.

=== German sources ===
- Peter Simon Pallas (1797). Tagebuch einer Reise die im Jahr 1781 von der Granzfestung Mosdok nach dem innern Caucasus unternommen worden [Diary of a journey made in 1781 from the Grand Fortress of Mozdok to the inner Caucasus] (in German). St. Petersburg und Leipzig: Ben Johann Zacharias Logan. pp. 1–142.

=== Russian sources ===
- Администрация города Назрань (April 3, 2024). "Наш город Назрань" [Our city Nazran]. www.nazrangrad.ru (in Russian).
- Алироев, И. Ю. (1978). Вопросы отраслевой лексики [Questions of industry vocabulary] (in Chechen, Ingush, and Russian). Грозный: Чечено-Ингушский гос. унив. pp. 1–131.
- Гаджиев, З. Т. (2019). Барахоева, Н. М.; Дзарахова, З. М.-Т.; Жеребило, Т. В. (eds.). "К вопросу о датировке основания города Назрань как ингушского поселения, существующего не менее 250 лет" [On the question of dating the founding of the city of Nazran as an Ingush settlement that has existed for at least 250 years] (PDF). Вестник Ингушского научно-исследовательского института гуманитарных наук им. Ч.Э. Ахриева (in Russian). No. 2. Магас. pp. 171–191.
- Жуков, Е. М.; et al., eds. (1964). "Двинск—Индонезия" [Dvinsk—Indonesia]. Советская историческая энциклопедия. Vol. 5. М.: Советская энциклопедия. col. 1–960.
- Kurkiev, A. S. (1978). "Вопросы ингушской антропонимики" [Questions of Ingush anthroponymy]. In Aliroev, I. Yu.; Selimov, A. A.; Shekurova, V. G.; Bibulatov, N. S. (eds.). Вопросы отраслевой лексики [Questions of industry vocabulary] (in Russian). Grozny: ChIGU. pp. 19–35.
- Kurkiev, A. S. (1979). Основные вопросы лексикологии ингушского языка [The main questions of the lexicology of the Ingush language] (in Russian). Grozny: ChIKI. pp. 1–254.
- Markovin, V. I. (1987). "О христианизации горцев северо-восточного Кавказа и храме Датуна в Дагестане" [On the Christianization of the Highlanders of the North-Eastern Caucasus and the Temple of Datong in Dagestan]. In Magomedov, D. M.; Mammaev, M. M. (eds.). Художественная культура средневекового Дагестана: сборник статей [Artistic culture of medieval Dagestan: collection of articles] (PDF) (in Russian). Makhachkala: DF AN SSSR. pp. 37–48.
- Malsagov, A. (2005). Ингуши. Краткая история, их участие в войнах России [The Ingush: A brief history and their participation in Russia's wars] (in Russian). Pyatigorsk: RIA KMV. p. 341. ISBN 5-89314-038-9.
- Lavrov, L. I. (1966). Bolshakov, O. G.; Gardanov; et al. (eds.). Эпиграфические памятники Северного Кавказа X—XVII вв. [Epigraphic monuments of the North Caucasus in the 10th–17th centuries]. Памятники письменности Востока (in Russian). Vol. 1. Moscow: Nauka. pp. 1–299.
- Поспелов, Е. М. (2008). Географические названия России. Топонимический словарь [Geographical names of Russia. Toponymic Dictionary] (in Russian). Москва: АСТ, Астрель. pp. 1–523. ISBN 978-5-17-054966-5.
- Сулейманов, А. С. (1980). Лепиев, А. С. (ed.). Часть III: (Предгорная равнина Чечено-Ингушетии) [Part 3: (Piedmont plain of Checheno-Ingushetia)]. Топонимия Чечено-Ингушетии: в IV частях (1976–1985 гг.) (in Russian). Грозный: Чечено-Ингушское Книжное Издательство. pp. 1–220.
- Твёрдый, А. В. (2008). Макаренко, Ю. Г. (ed.). Кавказ в именах, названиях, легендах: опыт топонимического словаря [Caucasus in names, titles, legends: Toponymic Dictionary Experience] (in Russian). Краснодар: Платонов И. pp. 1–432. ISBN 978-5-89564-044-9.
- Шмидт, О. Ю.; et al., eds. (1939). "Назрановцы" [The Nazranians]. Большая Советская Энциклопедия (in Russian). Vol. 41: Наган — Нидерландское искусство (1st ed.). Москва: Советская энциклопедия. col. 52 – via Wikisource.

== Documents ==
- Народное Собрание Республики Ингушетия. Закон №5-РЗ от 23 февраля 2009 г. «Об установлении границ муниципальных образований Республики Ингушетия и наделении их статусом сельского поселения, муниципального района и городского округа», в ред. Закона №9-РЗ от 4 марта 2014 г. «О внесении изменений в Закон Республики Ингушетия "Об установлении границ муниципальных образований Республики Ингушетия и наделении их статусом сельского поселения, муниципального района и городского округа"». Вступил в силу со дня официального опубликования. Опубликован: "Ингушетия", №26–27, 3 марта 2009 г. (People's Assembly of the Republic of Ingushetia. Law #5-RZ of February 23, 2009 On Establishing the Borders of the Municipal Formations of the Republic of Ingushetia and on Granting Them the Status of a Rural Settlement, Municipal District, and Urban Okrug, as amended by the Law #9-RZ of March 4, 2014 On Amending the Law of the Republic of Ingushetia "On Establishing the Borders of the Municipal Formations of the Republic of Ingushetia and on Granting Them the Status of a Rural Settlement, Municipal District, and Urban Okrug". Effective as of the day of the official publication.).
