= Nazranovsky District =

Nazranovsky District Назрановский район (Russian)
- District

Other transcription(s)
  - Ingush: Наьсарен шахьар
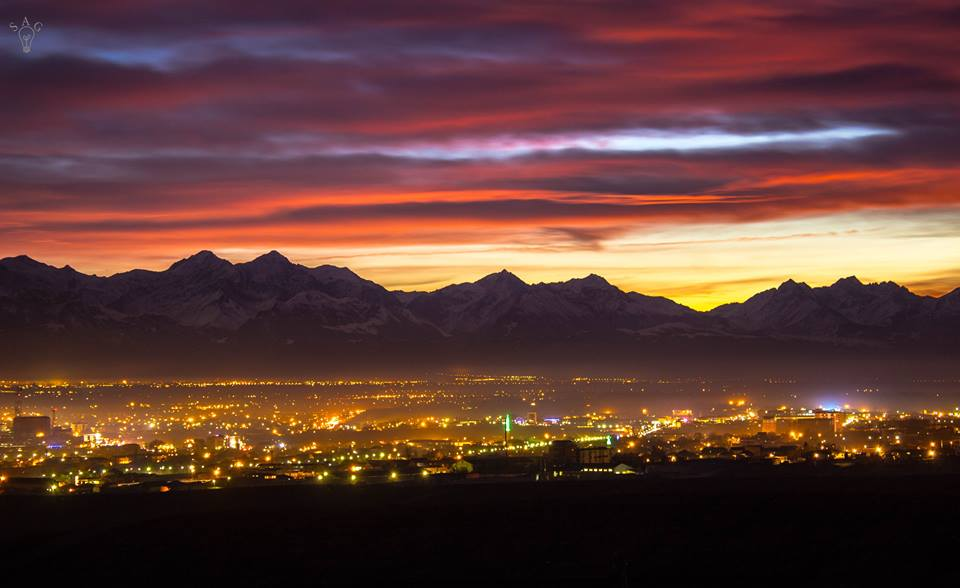
- Nazranovsky District against the backdrop of the Caucasus Mountains

- Flag Coat of arms
- Location of Nazranovsky District in the Republic of Ingushetia
- Coordinates: 43°13′N 44°46′E
- Country: Russia
- Federal subject: Republic of Ingushetia
- Established: 7 November 1924
- Administrative center: Nazran

Area
  - Total: 430.4 km^{2} (166.2 sq mi)

Population (2010 Census)
  - Total: 87,851
  - Density: 204.1/km^{2} (528.7/sq mi)
  - Urban: 0%
  - Rural: 100%

Administrative structure
  - Inhabited localities: 10 rural localities

Municipal structure
  - Municipally incorporated as: Nazranovsky Municipal District
  - Municipal divisions: 0 urban settlements, 9 rural settlements
- Time zone: UTC+3 (MSK)
- OKTMO ID: 26605000
- Website: http://nazran-rayon.ru

Population of Nazranovsky District
- 2010 Census: 87,851
- 2002 Census: 85,021
- 1989 Census: 78,956
- 1979 Census: 66,187

Nazranovsky District (Russian: Назра́новский райо́н; Ingush: Наьсарен шахьар, Näsaren šaꜧar) is an administrative and municipal district (raion), one of the four in the Republic of Ingushetia, Russia. It is located in the central and western parts of the republic. The area of the district is 430.4 square kilometers (166.2 sq mi). Its administrative center is the town of Nazran (which is not administratively a part of the district). As of the 2010 Census, the total population of the district was 87,851.

== Administrative and municipal status ==
Within the framework of administrative divisions, Nazranovsky District is one of the four in the Republic of Ingushetia and has administrative jurisdiction over all of its ten rural localities. The town of Nazran serves as its administrative center, despite being incorporated separately as a town of republic significance—an administrative unit with the status equal to that of the districts.

As a municipal division, the district is incorporated as Nazranovsky Municipal District. Its ten rural localities are incorporated into nine rural settlements within the municipal district. The town of republic significance of Nazran is incorporated separately from the district as Nazran Urban Okrug, but serves as the administrative center of the municipal district as well.
