= Nazran okrug =

District in Caucasus

Coordinates: 43°13′N 44°46′E

Nazran okrug Назрановский округ
- Okrug
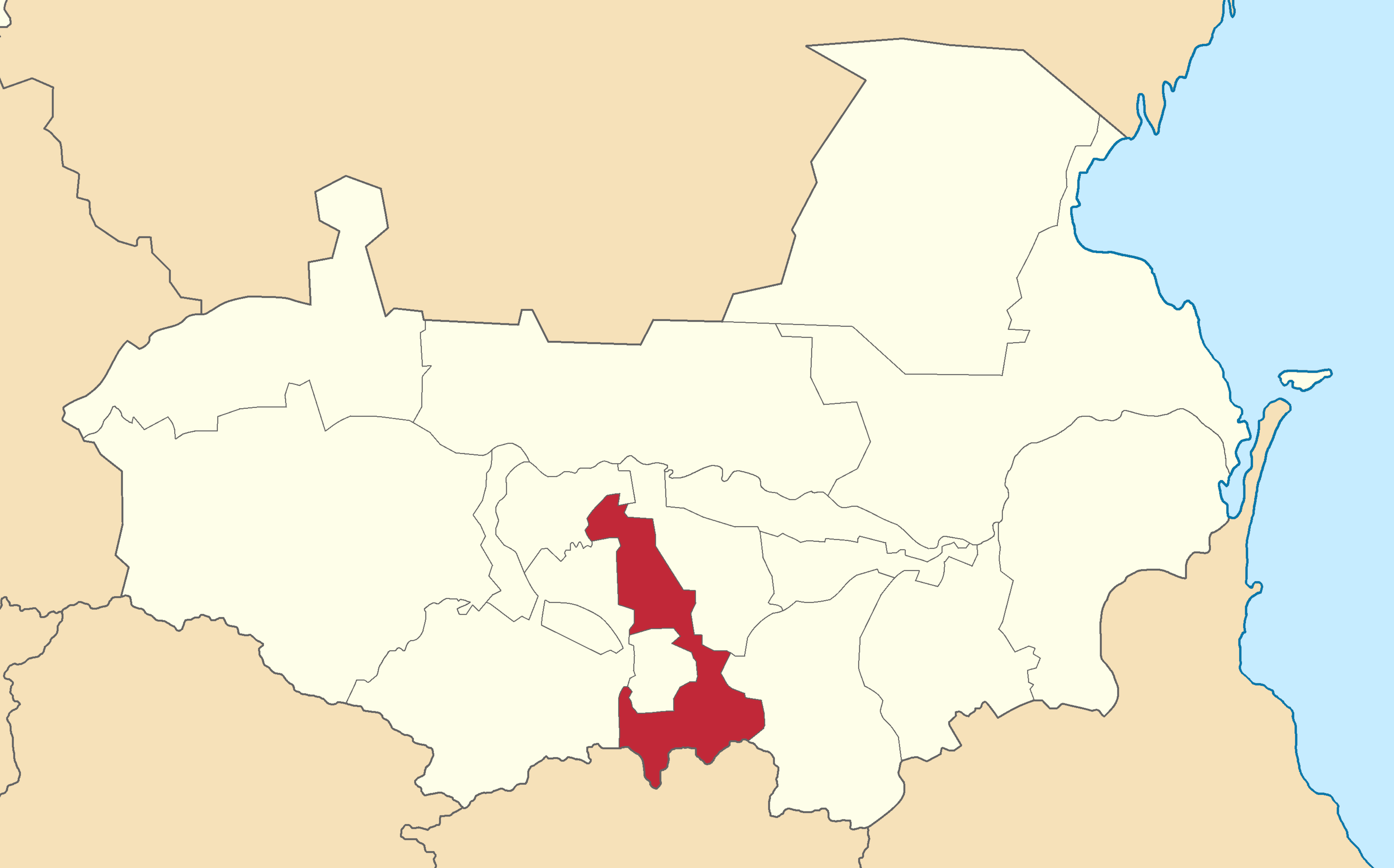
- Location in the Terek Oblast
- Country: Russian Empire
- Viceroyalty: Caucasus
- Oblast: Terek
- Established: 1905
- Abolished: 1924
- Capital: Vladikavkaz

Area
  - Total: 1,526.14 km^{2} (589.25 sq mi)

Population (1916)
  - Total: 59,046
  - Density: 38.690/km^{2} (100.21/sq mi)
  - Rural: 100.00%

The Nazran okrug, (Note: Russian: Назрановский округ, pre-reform orthography: Назрановскій округъ, romanized: Nazranovskiy okrug; Ingush: Наьсарен окре, romanized: Näsaren okre) known after March 1917 as the Ingush okrug, (Note: Russian: Ингушский округ, pre-reform orthography: Ингушскій округъ, romanized: Ingushskiy okrug; Ingush: Гӏалгӏай окре, romanized: Ghalghaj okre) was a district (okrug) of the Terek Oblast of the Caucasus Viceroyalty of the Russian Empire, and after 1921, the Mountain ASSR of the Russian SFSR within the Soviet Union. The district had a population of 59 thousand and area approximating 1,500 square kilometres (580 mi^{2}), the smallest of all the Terek Oblast's subdivisions in both measures. The administrative centre of the district was the city of Vladikavkaz.

Due to the Tsarist government's redistribution of land to Cossacks, local peasantry were forced to rent land from the Cossack landowners. As a result of the constant hostilities with the neighbouring Cossacks, the district was formed in 1905 as a separate subdivision for Ingush people. The district passed between the Mountainous Republic of the North Caucasus, the Terek Soviet Republic, and the Armed Forces of South Russia, until finally passing to the control of the Red Army. The area of the Nazran okrug presently corresponds to part of the North Caucasian Federal District of Russia.

In 1916, the district was almost exclusively populated by North Caucasians—predominantly Ingush—with Russians forming less than 1 percent of the population. The district contained 135 settlements, some of which underwent a series of repressions due to raids by local Ingush outlaws.

== History ==
=== Establishment ===
Due to mutual hostility and constant conflicts between Ingush and Cossack peoples, the Russian government was forced to form a separate district for Ingush. By a decree of 8 December [O.S. 25 November] 1905, the Ingush populated land, consisting of seventeen plain villages and four mountain societies, (Note: Dzherakh, Fyappiy, Khamkhins, Tsorins.) was carved from the Sunzhensky otdel to temporarily create Nazran okrug. Despite the fact that this territorial reform was intended to solve the immediate practical problem not in favor of the Ingush and with the reform subsequently displacing numerous Ingush farms and entire villages located on lands leased from the Cossacks outside the otdel, the Ingush met this reform with great enthusiasm. The very fact of the restoration of the national-territorial district inspired great hopes, especially since the government itself admitted that the ataman of the Sunzhensky otdel, under whose control the Ingush were previously, due to his military duties, didn't have the opportunity to pay due attention arrangement of civil and economic life of the Ingush population.

Due to the reform being temporary, the local population was worried. In January 1908, elected from the Ingush people, lieutenant Tatre Albogachiev, Shaptuko Kuriev and Duguz Hadzhi Bekov arrived in Tiflis in order to intercede with the Viceroy of Caucasus, Illarion Vorontsov-Dashkov, on "the approval of the temporarily formed Nazran okrug." The request was granted and the Nazran okrug within its specified boundaries was approved on 10 June 1909. The okrug's administration and the mountain verbal court were established on a common basis with other okrugs of Terek Oblast] By a decree of 6 August [O.S. 24 July] 1909, Nazran okrug was deemed permanent.

The seat of the district administration was appointed Nazran which, in practice, didn't function as the seat of the administration due to a lack of suitable buildings. Instead, Vladikavkaz was appointed the seat of the administration up until January 1917 by a decree of February 1913 of the State Council and the State Duma.

=== Imperial Russian rule ===
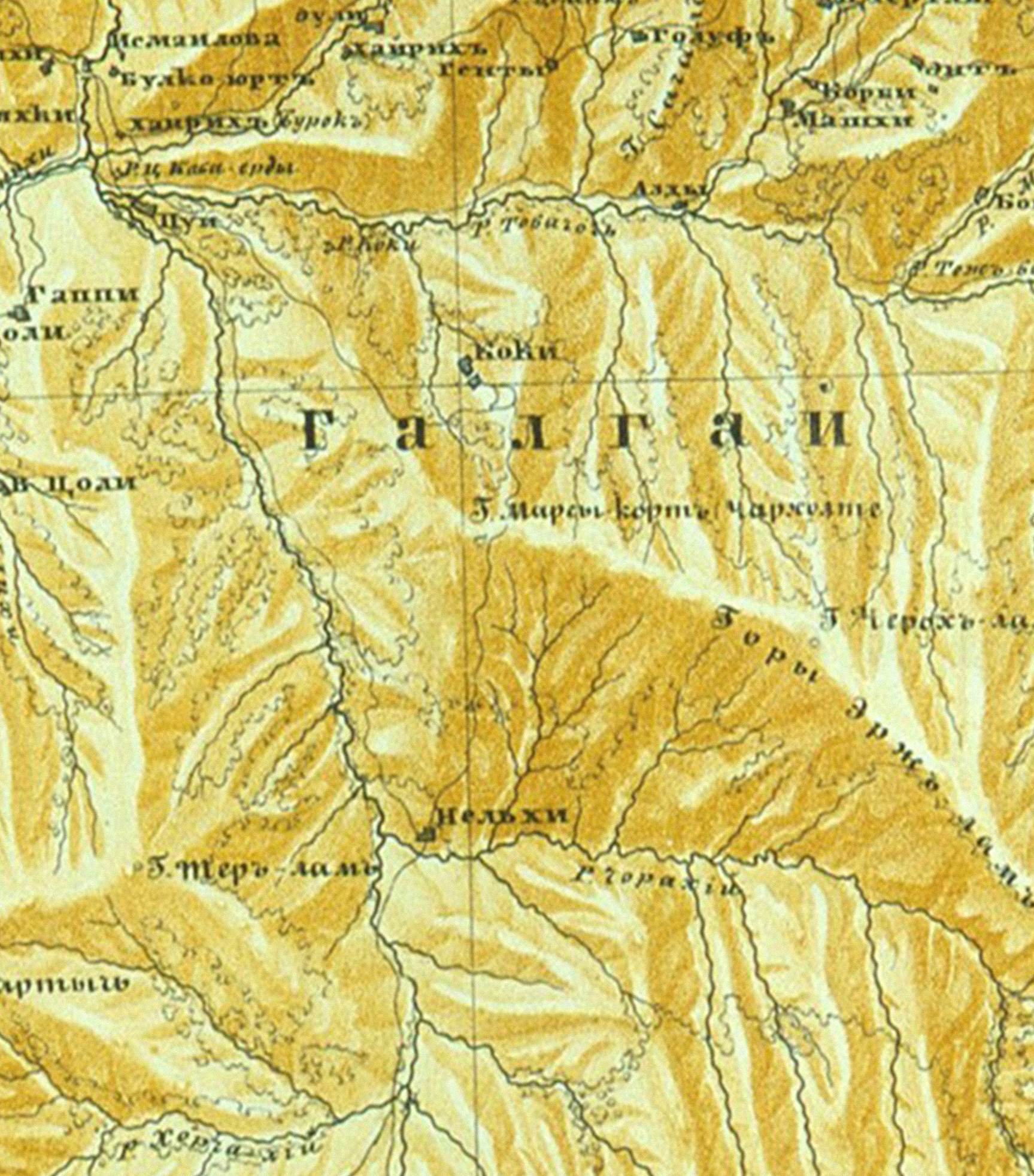
The villages of Koki (Коки) and Nelkh (Нельхи) on a mid 19th century topographic map, located on the Assa river's banks.

In 1905, displays of mountaineers' disloyalty to the administration and its local representatives increased. At meetings of various villages, the Ingush population demanded the return of lands that previously belonged to them which were seized under the control of the state property department. It was during the beginning of December of the same year when more serious clashes between local residents and the authorities in Ingush villages started to happen.

On 23 December 1905, the Nazran okrug's head, Lieutenant Colonel Ya. E. Mitnik, was killed during attempt to disarm the highlanders in the village of Barsuki. His murder was a response to the ongoing terror conducted by the Tsarist administration in the okrug. Mitnik's death, along with the railway strike that had been ongoing since 8 December and the Lagir peasant uprising that broke out on 21 December, played a role in the introduction of martial law in the entire Terek Oblast on 23 December.

Furious over the robberies and raids of the abreks Zelimkhan and Sulumbek, Aleksandr Mikheev, together with Ingush tsarist officers, gathered the entire Ingush clergy in Vladikavkaz on 23 September 1910. He spoke to them with insults and announced to them that the Ingush were deprived of the right to use the Cossack lands they leased, (Note: The Cossack lands they leased were formerly Ingush but were forcibly taken away in favor of the Cossacks.) that he was depriving the okrug of the right to elect elders and that he would submit a petition to the viceroy of the Caucasus for the demolition of all Ingush farms and villages of the Assa Gorge. This meant the forceful property seizure from the disadvantaged mountain population. Furthermore, Mikheev began to petition Russian government to organize a punitive expedition to the Ingush mountains, the allowance for which would be entrusted to the Ingush mountaineers, who were already in poverty under the yoke of the military-police regime.

In 1911, as wave of severe repressions swept across the okrug, the villages Koki, Nelkh and Ersh were destroyed. 360 representatives of the Kokurkhoev family, including children, women and old people, were jailed in a Vladikavkaz prison for three months and then exiled to the Yeniseysk Governorate. Fearing an uprising of the mountaineers for independence under the leadership of influential clergy, Russian authorities also exiled prominent spiritual figures (Note: Such as Doku-Sheikh Shaptukaev, Bamat-Girey Hajji Mitaev, Deni Arsanov, Batal Hajji Belkhoroev, Uzun Hajji, Chimmirza, Kanna-Sheikh Khantiev, Sugaip-Mullah Gaisumov, Magomet Hajji Nazirov and Yusup Hajji.) of Chechnya, Ingushetia and Dagestan. According to Lemka Agieva, more than 30 people from among the highest Chechen and Ingush clergy were exiled.

Moreover, the Ingush, Chechens and other mountain peoples were accused of all the mortal sins. For example, the Cossack nationalist Georgy Tkachev published in 1911 the book Ingush and Chechens in the Family of Nationalities of the Terek Region where he justified the Cossack and military-police lawlessness against the Chechens and Ingush, explaining that the reason for the robberies on the part of the mountaineers "lies in the very character of the Ingush–Chechen people".

=== World War I and Russian Civil War ===
The outbreak of the World War I dealt another serious blow to the economic situation of the Nazran okrug which was already quite adverse. New military conditions, an increase in old taxes and the introduction of new ones, in fact, an emergency regime further aggravated the economic and political situation of the okrug.

The February Revolution of 1917, which overthrew the Tsarist autocracy, found a wide response by local masses. Already in early March 1918, civil committees were created in the Terek Oblast which served as a local representation of the Russian Provisional Government. By 1 May 1917 National Councils had also been created in individual okrugs of the Terek Oblast, including Nazran okrug, which became known as Ingush okrug from March 1917. The Ingush National Council was headed by Vassan-Girey Dzhabagiev. His brother Magomed Dzhabagiev was the representative of Ingushetia within the Civil Committee in Vladikavkaz, being the latter's commissioner for the okrug.

During the Russian Civil War in 1917–22, the Cossacks and the local mountain populations of the okrug had armed clashes. One part of the population supported the Terek Soviet Republic formed in March 1918 while the other part supported the Mountain Republic founded in May 1918. During the North Caucasus Operation of the Red Army in 1920, the territory of the okrug was occupied by the Red Army.

=== Soviet rule ===
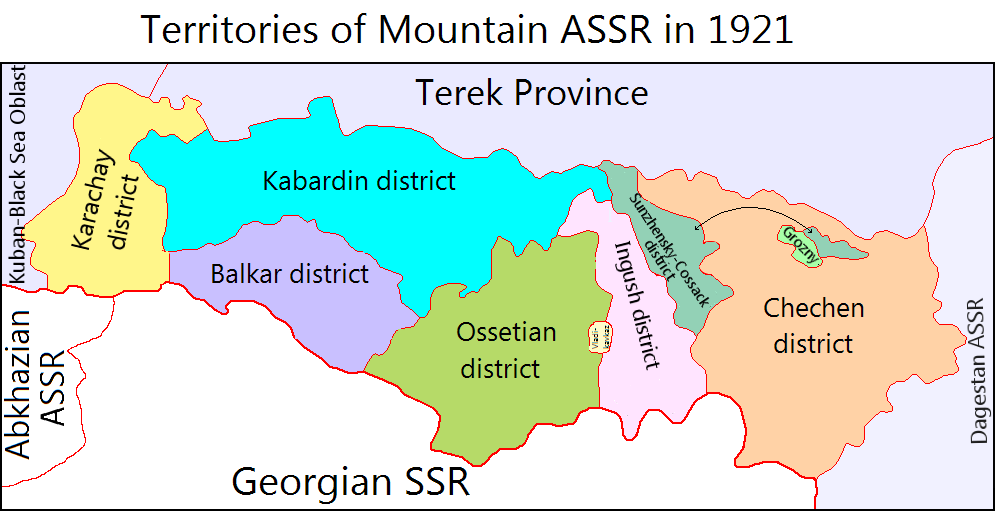
Ingush (Nazran) okrug within Mountain ASSR.

The first congress of the Ingush people was held in Nazran on 4 April 1920. It was attended by prominent Bolshevik revolutionaries like Sergo Ordzhonikidze and Sergei Kirov who were welcomed by 15,000 Ingush. The congress ended with the proclamation of the restoration of Soviet power in the Ingush okrug and approval of the composition of the Ingush District Revolutionary Committee, which included Gapur Akhriev, Yusup Albogachiev, Idris Zyazikov and others. After the death of the first chairman of the committee, Gapur Akhriev, the first re-organization took place in April with Albogachiev becoming the next chairman. The Terek Regional Revolutionary created on 8 April 1920 also approved the new composition of the Ingush Revolutionary Committee.

In early 1920s a purge of people in Ingush okrug who were deemed dissidents and unreliable people by the Soviet regime began. For instance, in the summer of 1920, the former head of the Ingush State Guard Magomed Kotiev and Colonel Kerim Goigov were arrested. The collection of food tax to which the population became subject to was a disaster as they, exhausted by war, devastation and drought, could not pay on time and in full. Although in 1924 there was a Cossack-Ingush clash near the village of Yandare, in general the interethnic atmosphere improved somewhat in the okrug after the Russian Civil War's conclusion.

From 26 March to 1 April 1921, the Congress of Soviets of the Ingush okrug was held. Delegates from 28 villages of the okrug were present at the congress. Idris Zyazikov was elected chairman of the executive committee of the congress. Issues of taking measures to combat robberies and banditry were discussed at the congress. It ended with the election of the executive committee, which included Idris Zyazikov, Ali Gorchkhanov, Inaluk Malsagov, Yusup Albogachiev, Sultan Aldiev and others.

On 21 January 1921, the All-Russian Central Executive Committee issued a decree on the formation of the Mountain Republic on the territory of the former Terek Oblast. Paragraph 8 of the decree read: "The Autonomous Mountain Socialist Soviet Republic is divided into 6 administrative districts, each with its own district executive committee: 1) Chechen; 2) Ingush; 3) Ossetian; 4) Kabardian; 5) Balkar; 6) Karachai." The Congress of Soviets of the Ingush okrug held on 26 March to 1 April 1921 fully approved and welcomed the creation of an autonomous republic. The process of the creation of Mountain ASSR ended on 16–22 April 1921 with the Founding Congress of Soviets of the Republic in Vladikavkaz, which on behalf of the All-Russian Central Executive Committee and the Central Committee of the Russian Communist Party welcomed Sergei Kirov. From Ingush okrug, Idris Zyazikov entered the governing bodies of the ASSR—to the Central Executive Committee as deputy chairman and to the Council of People's Commissars as People's Commissar of Internal Affairs. On 27 January 1922, he was also elected chairman of the Mountain Central Executive Committee.

After the Founding Congress of the GASSR on 22 April 1921 approved the elimination of Cossack stripes due to the strong need of land by mountaineers, the territory of Ingush okrug expanded from 184,438.90 dessiatines (2,015 square kilometres (778 mi^{2})) to 292,193 dessiatines (3,192.21 square kilometres (1,232.52 mi^{2})) which made it possible for the majority of residents of the mountainous region to move to the plain. In 1920–22 the plots of the former Cossack stanitsas of Sunzhenskaya, Vorontsovo-Dashkovskaya, Tarskoye and Kambileevsky farms were distributed between 4 mountain Ingush societies—Dzherakh, Fyappins, Khamkhins and Tsorins. The total area of Ingush okrug grew by 58.4% from the lands that were transferred from Sunzhensky otdel, Vladikavkazsky okrug and Nalchisky okrug. However, the per capita supply of all land in the okrug increased by only 0.78 dessiatines, and the provision of convenient land alone by only 0.07 dessiatines. Thus, the crisis of land shortage in the okrug wasn't resolved. The drought in Ingushetia in the summer of 1921 resulted in meager grain harvests in Keskem, Nazran and other places.

In May–June 1922, the Extraordinary Commission of the City Central Executive Committee and the Council of People's Commissars of the Mountain ASSR concluded a number of serious shortcomings in the work of the party and Soviet bodies of the Chechen, Digor, Sunzha and Ingush okrugs. The role of the Bolsheviks in Soviet construction was insignificant and there weren't enough experienced party and Soviet workers. Based on the materials of the Extraordinary Commission, the State Central Executive Committee passed a resolution on 13 June 1922 which dissolved the Chechen, Nazran, Digor and Sunzha okrug executive committees and appointed instead revolutionary committees from the most experienced party and Soviet workers, tested in practical work. The revolutionary committees were strengthened by the Bolsheviks.

In May–June 1922, the Extraordinary Commission of the City Central Executive Committee and the Council of People's Commissars of the Mountain ASSR concluded a number of serious shortcomings in the work of the party and Soviet bodies of the Chechen, Digor, Sunzha and Ingush okrugs. The role of the Bolsheviks in Soviet construction was insignificant and there weren't enough experienced party and Soviet workers. Based on the materials of the Extraordinary Commission, the State Central Executive Committee passed a resolution on 13 June 1922 which dissolved the Chechen, Nazran, Digor and Sunzha okrug executive committees and appointed instead revolutionary committees from the most experienced party and Soviet workers, tested in practical work. The revolutionary committees were strengthened by the Bolsheviks.

The zoning of the Mountain ASSR was completed by September 1923. The republic was divided into Ossetian, Ingush and Sunzha okrugs. The Ingush okrug was divided into three raions—Nazran, Psedakh and Galashkin; it included 39 village executive committees.

On 7 July 1924, with the abolition of the Mountain ASSR, Ingush okrug was succeeded by the Ingush Autonomous Oblast.

== Economy ==
=== Agriculture ===
Local peasantry were suffering from lack of land. Cossacks being the largest land magnates of the Terek Oblast, owned about a third of the entire territory, despite the so-called military class compromising less than a fifth of the total population of the oblast. The Ingush population was forced to rent land from the Cossacks, paying them a very high price, ranging from 3 to 8.3 rubles. For instance, in the Galashian Gorge, 484 households, of which 1,487 were Ingush men, rented 5,788 acres of land from the Terek Army. Ingush mountain societies annually paid 49,943 rubles for the rental of Cossack and landowner land. In total, there was 8 rubles in rent per capita of the male population.

Despite numerous demands and appeals from the population, the territory of the Nazran okrug never increased and it remained at the size of 2,468.1 square versts (2,808.9 km^{2}; 1,084.5 mi^{2}). This led to the extreme severity of the problem of land shortage. Peasants had an average of 1.8 dessiatines of land per male soul in the mountainous region and 4 dessiatines in the plain region. Furthermore, the land wasn't always suitable for sowing. For comparison, the Cossacks had 21.3 tithes per capita.

A large number of Ingush farms were completely landless. At the same time, the peasants were pressed by numerous direct and indirect taxes and duties. The groups of Nazran okrug became more and more stratified in a way: at one side there was a wealthy elite—the kulaks, at the other—a mass of landless and land-poor peasants—rural proletarians and semi-proletarians. This stratification, although on a much smaller scale, could also be observed in the mountainous region, where the population lived by renting land and non-agricultural labor.

The rental relations developed especially intensively under the conditions of the Stolypin reform and with the creation of local branches of the Peasants' Land Bank. Before the outbreak of World War I, the purchase and sale of land became widespread. For instance, inhabitants of the Metskhal society like Yandievs, Esmurzievs, Daurbekovs, Bersanovs, Kotievs, Matievs and Zaurovs purchased 1,000 acres of land from the landowner F. Pelipeyko in 1911.

Prior to the Russian Revolution, wheat was rarely produced in the highland zone of the Nazran okrug, and more so in the lowland region. (Note: The lowlands consisted of the villages of Kantyshevo, Nazran, Plievo, and others.) On the eve of World War I, corn—as a more productive crop—became a new source of profit for wealthy Ingush, taking wheat's place. In the Nazran okrug, corn was produced the most out of all types of crops, occupying 85% of agriculture. The Nazran okrug took the second place in the Terek Oblast in terms of corn production. Commercial corn was centred mainly at the Nazran railway station, which had a dumping point. From there, it was exported to the larger settlements of Grozny and Vladikavkaz. The Elkhotovo traders formed the company Tatartup which bought more than 40 percent of corn produced by Ingush.

Gardening and melon growing was also practiced in Nazran okrug, although the latter played a completely unnoticeable role in the district's economy. Akin to melon growing, gardening played a relative role and it was practiced only in the areas where natural and climatic conditions were suitable. Fruit and mixed gardens in 1912–13 occupied no more than 64 dessiatines of land. They consisted mainly of varieties of folk selection, differing in their breed and variety mixture; apple trees, pears, plums, dogwoods, and nuts were grown. By 1916, gardens were in the okrug were all fruit and occupied 645 dessiatines of land, of which 502 dessiatines were the lands of rural societies and 142 dessiatines were privately owned lands. Rural gardens were subject to a quitrent tax, and private gardens were subject to state land tax and zemstvo tax.

Cattle breeding played second most important role in Nazran Okrug. Its development and spread depended on summer and winter pastures. In 1915, the Ingush had 42,908 dessiatines of summer rural pastures and 317 dessiatines of privately owned pastures. Pastures were distributed unevenly between villages and hamlets; most of them did not have their own land at all and rented it. Cattle breeding was partly transhumance and was accompanied by mortality and transmission of infections like rabies to which main part of livestock died as result of absence of needed veterinary hospitals nor an outpatient clinic in the okrug, also, doctors had to be brought from Vladikavkaz or Mozdok.

Sheep farming was the main branch of the district's economy. In 1912, there were 78,958 coarse-wool sheep in Ingushetia. The following year, there were 74,377 coarse-wool and 10,000 fine-wool sheep. In 1914, there 120,628 of both. In 1915, there were 88,605 coarse-wool and 6,500 fine-wool sheep. Initially, the Ingush bred coarse-wooled Tushin sheep of the fat-tailed breed. But fine-wool Merino sheep from the Khasavyurt okrug was brought, although more than 3,500 of them died due to capriciousness and non-resistance to diseases. In the lowland zone, sheep breeding became a secondary occupation. In addition to sheep farming, horses, cattle, and buffaloes were also raised. In the lowland villages of Bazorkino, Nazran and Barsuki it wasn't possible to develop cattle breeding due to extreme limitation of pasture and mowing lands did not make it possible to develop this branch of cattle breeding. In the villages of Bazorkino, Achaluki, Plievo and Nazran, there were only 246 buffaloes for 2,152 households. Poultry farming was developed in the villages of Bazorkino and Achaluki. Some of the meat and dairy products produced were traded by the Ingush. The Ingush sold large quantities of cottage cheese in the markets of Vladikavkaz and Beslan. Meat and live poultry and oil was also sold in the markets. Trade was primarily carried out by wealthy peasants and representatives of other nationalities who temporarily resided in the okrug.

The Ingush were also engaged in beekeeping which did not produce much product. The Ingush were part of the Tarskoye Society of Agriculture and Agricultural Industry. With the outbreak of World War I, there was a decline in all sectors of agriculture: the sowing and harvesting of grain was reduced and the number of livestock of all types decreased.

=== Revenue ===
The Regulations on Rural (Aul) Societies (1870) regulated the life of the rural population of the Terek Oblast. Based on this regulations, the local Russian administration proceeded opening rural boards and courts, convening assemblies and collecting taxes. The Nazran okrug was subject to state quitrent taxes and land taxes from which the Ingush peasantry suffered. In 1915, state and zemstvo taxes were paid by 49 rural societies and 147 private estates which owned 121,348 and 14,395 acres of land; in total, the state received 78,660 rubles in land tax and quitrent tax from the okrug.

Since the regulations did not establish the types of taxes and their size, the local administration itself often introduced indirect taxes at will. For example, the villages of Barsuki and Yandare were subject to such taxes like office and repair expenses, a personal tax, a tax in lieu of serving military service, a zemstvo and medical tax, a fee for the maintenance of the Nazran mountain school, policemen and horsemen at the post. Despite the route along the postal route from the station Beslan to the city of Port-Petrovsk (present-day Makhachkala), on the territory of Nazran, having a length of only 22 miles, 258 rubles were collected for the maintenance of the zemstvo post office 54 kopecks from The village of Yandare. For comparison, for the maintenance of a postal route 26 versts (28 km; 17 mi) through Sleptsovskaya (present-day Sunzha), the administration collected only 120 rubles.

The entire rural population of the Nazran okrug bore secular duties to satisfy the internal needs of the peasant community. Based on the regulations of 19 February 1861, these duties were divided into compulsory and optional. In 1911, the compulsory duties of the okrug included: maintenance of the clergy – 924 rubles; maintenance of public administration personnel – 24,984 rubles; road repairs – 6,065 rubles; maintenance of the sanitary and charitable parts – 1,971 rubles. Optional duties of the okrug included: maintenance, construction and repair of schools – 3,532 rubles; construction, repair and rental of various other premises – 3,051 rubles; for various other needs (Note: Fees that peasant societies could establish for the establishment of rural schools, maintenance of teachers and similar needs. In order for the fees to be established, verdicts needed drawn up with the consent of at least 2/3 of all peasants having the right to vote at the assembly.) – 157,558 rubles.

In addition to aforementioned taxes and fees, some targeted Fred were collected from the population. For instance, in 1909, residents of the village Nasyr-Kort requested permission to build a path from the Nazran station to the village of Mikheevsky. They were allowed with the requirement to complete the road project and carry out all earthworks at their own expense, as well as to deposit 24,562 rubles into the cash desk of the Nazran station.

== Administrative divisions ==
The prefectures (участки, uchastki) of the Nazran okrug in 1917 were as follow:

Name	Administrative centre	Population
First prefecture (1-й участок)	Psedakh	15,720
Second prefecture (2-й участок)	Nazran	24,982
Third prefecture (3-й участок)	Vladikavkaz	13,395

The rural communities (сельские общества, selskiye obshchestva) of the okrug in 1917 were as follow:

- Verkhne (Note: 'Upper' in Russian.)-Achalukskoye (Верхне-Ачалукское)
- Nizhne (Note: 'Lower' in Russian.)-Achalukskoye (Нижне-Ачалукское)
- Sredne (Note: 'Middle' in Russian.)-Achalukskoye (Средне-Ачалукское)
- Donakovskoye (Донаковское)
- Kantyshevskoye (Кантышевское)
- Keskemskoye (Кескемское)
- Psedakhskoye (Пседахское)
- Sogopshskoye (Согопшское)
- Altyyevskoye (Алыевское)
- Bursukovskoye (Бурсуковское)
- Gamurziyevskoye (Гамурзиевское)
- Nasyr-Kortovskoye (Насыр-Кортовское)
- Pliyevskoye (Плиевское)
- Surkhokhinskoye (Сурхохинское)
- Ekazhevskoye (Экажевское)
- Yandyrskoye (Яндырское)
- Bazorkinskoye (Базоркинское)
- Dzherakhoyevskoye (Джерахоевское)
- Metskhalskoye (Мецхальское)
- Khamkhinskoye (Хамхинское)
- Tsorinskoye (Цоринское)

== Demographics ==
According to the 1917 publication of Kavkazskiy kalendar, the Nazran okrug had a population of 59,046 on 14 January [O.S. 1 January] 1916, including 31,038 men and 28,008 women, 57,178 of whom were the permanent population, and 1,868 were temporary residents:

Nationality	Number	%
North Caucasians	58,842	99.65
Russians	204	0.35
TOTAL	59,046	100.00

== Settlements ==
In 1914, the Nazran okrug consisted of the following 135 settlements:

Settlement	Population	Settlement	Population	Settlement	Population
Abini	188	Datykh N.	285	Odzik Sr.	33
Agenty	40	Dlinnaya-Dolina	769	Odzik N.	14
Agutyr	15	Dokal	56	Ozmi V.	94
Adsegi	35	Dolakovskoye	2,009	Ozmi Sr.	17
Akabos	22	Dugurgidzh	82	Ozmi N.	25
Alikhochet	10	Ersh	138	Olget	50
Alkun	342	Kaberakh	61	Pamyat	18
Al'tyyevskoye	1,123	Kaylakh	35	Pliyevskoye	2,115
Anty	14	Kayrakh	35	Psedakh	1,420
Arzi	398	Kantysheva	3,474	Puy	25
Arshtaug	3	Kedzi	20	Pyaling	120
Arshty V.	148	Keskem	1,686	Sagopsh	2,412
Achaluk N.	3,048	Kirki	18	Salgi	40
Achaluk V.	1,443	Kirobi	17	Sarali-Apiyevo	107
Achaluk St. (Note: 'Station' in Russian.)	1,494	Koki	32	Satkhum	32
Bazarkino	4,516	Koli	33	Semiogach	277
Balkoyevo	14	Kort	70	Suloy	78
Bartabos	264	Kost’	42	Surkhakhinskoye	3,230
Barkhin	47	Koshet	61	Tarsh	109
Belkhan	41	Koshki	110	Torgim	22
Berezhki V.	49	Kyakhk	18	Tori	12
Berezhki Sr.	115	Largebini	48	Tumgoy V.	34
Biser	32	Lelyakh	88	Tumgoy N.	73
Boyni	151	Lyazhki	198	Ushkhot	77
Bosht	31	Lyaymi V.	17	Faykhan	271
Buguzhur	98	Lyaymi N.	42	Farapi	113
Bursukovskoye	3,006	Lyashgi	17	Fartaug	127
Vovnushki	18	Lyashk	7	Khay	30
Gadaborsh	9	Mergisty	94	Khayrakh	25
Gazot	24	Metskhal’	158	Khalili	38
Galashki	1,655	Miller	21	Khamyshki	95
Galu	4	Moruch	59	Khani	29
Galushki	25	Muguchkal	93	Khastmak	14
Gamurziyevskoye	2,120	Mudich	290	Khulya	246
Gatstsi	13	Mulkum	16	Tsizda	28
Garak	170	Musiyevo	56	Tsoli	11
Gaust	135	Myashkhi	59	Tsori	145
Gent	66	Nazran’	350	Tsorkh	32
Goyrakh	84	Nakist	20	Tskheral’ty	105
Gorosty	22	Nasyr-Kort	4,664	Shan	140
Gorkigi	26	Nevel’	51	Egochkal	46
Gu	13	Nelkh	63	Ekazhevskoye	3,874
Gul	120	Nikota	16	Eshkal	100
Datkhoy-Begach	24	Nyy	86	Yandyrskoye	1,847
Datykh V.	275	Odzik V.	11	Yarech	34

== Bibliography ==
=== English sources ===
- Marshall, Alex (September 13, 2010). The Caucasus Under Soviet Rule (PDF). Routledge Studies in the History of Russia and Eastern Europe. Abingdon-on-Thames: Routledge. ISBN 9781136938252.
- Meskhidze, J. I. (March–June 2006). "Shaykh Batal Hajji from Surkhokhi: towards the history of Islam in Ingushetia" (PDF). Central Asian Survey. 25 (1–2). Routledge: 179–181. doi:10.1080/02634930600903262. eISSN 1465-3354. ISSN 0263-4937.
- Tsutsiev, Arthur (2014). Atlas of the Ethno-Political History of the Caucasus (PDF). Translated by Nora Seligman Favorov. New Haven: Yale University Press. ISBN 9780300153088. Archived (PDF) from the original on 17 June 2023.

=== Russian sources ===
- Albogachieva, Makka (2015). "Демаркация границ Ингушетии" [Demarcation of the borders of Ingushetia] (PDF). In Karpov, Yuriy (ed.). Горы и границы: Этнография посттрадиционных обществ [Mountains and Borders: An Ethnography of Post-Traditional Societies] (in Russian). SPb.: Kunstkamera. pp. 168–255. ISBN 978-5-88431-290-6. Archived (PDF) from the original on 2021-10-10.
- Daudov, Аbdulla; Meskhidze, Julietta (2009). Komissarova, Irina (ed.). Национальная государственность горских народов Северного Кавказа (1917—1924) [National statehood of the mountain peoples of the North Caucasus (1917-1924)] (in Russian). SPb.: SPSU. pp. 1–223.
- Dolgieva, Maryam; Kartoev, Magomet; Kodzoev, Nurdin; Matiev, Timur (2013). Kodzoev, Nurdin; et al. (eds.). История Ингушетии [History of Ingushetia] (4th ed.). Rostov-Na-Donu: Yuzhnyy izdatelsky dom. pp. 1–600. ISBN 978-5-98864-056-1.
- Dudarov, Abdul-Mazhit (2017). "Горцы и духовенство Северного Кавказа при смене двух империй — царской и большевистской" [Highlanders and clergy of the North Caucasus with the change of two empires - Tsarist and Bolshevik]. Vestnik INIIGN Im. Ch. E. Akhrieva (in Russian) (2). Magas: INIIGN im. Ch. E. Akhrieva: 10–16.
- Dzumatova, Zareta (2017). "К вопросу об экономическом развитии Назрановского (Ингушского) округа в начале XX века" [On the issue of economic development of the Nazran (Ingush) district at the beginning of the 20th century]. Sovremennaya Nauchnaya Mysl (in Russian) (3): 61–67.
- "ИНГУШЕ́ТИЯ" [INGUSHÉTIA]. Great Russian Encyclopedia (in Russian).
- Gritsenko, Nikolai (1971). Классовая борьба крестьян в чечено-ингушетии на рубеже XIX-XX веков [The class struggle of peasants in Chechen-Ingushetia at the turn of the 19th-20th centuries] (in Russian). Grozny: ChIKI. pp. 1–108.
- Кавказский календарь на 1911 год [Caucasus calendar for 1911] (in Russian) (66th ed.). Tiflis: Tipografiya kantselyarii Ye.I.V. na Kavkaze, kazenny dom. 1911. Archived from the original on 31 January 2022.
- Кавказский календарь на 1913 год [Caucasian calendar for 1913] (in Russian) (68th ed.). Tiflis: Tipografiya kantselyarii Ye.I.V. na Kavkaze, kazenny dom. 1913. Archived from the original on 19 April 2022.
- Кавказский календарь на 1915 год [Caucasian calendar for 1915] (in Russian) (70th ed.). Tiflis: Tipografiya kantselyarii Ye.I.V. na Kavkaze, kazenny dom. 1915. Archived from the original on 4 November 2021.
- Кавказский календарь на 1917 год [Caucasian calendar for 1917] (in Russian) (72nd ed.). Tiflis: Tipografiya kantselyarii Ye.I.V. na Kavkaze, kazenny dom. 1917. Archived from the original on 4 November 2021.
- Matiev, Timur (2011a). "Меры царской администрации по подавлению движений социального протеста в Ингушетии в 1905—1907 гг." [Measures of the tsarist administration suppression of social protest movements in Ingushetia in 1905–1907]. Vlast (in Russian) (9): 133–135. ISSN 2071-5358.
- Matiev, Timur (2011b). "Режим военного управления Ингушетии в период нахождения на ее территории Добровольческой армии в 1919—1920 гг." [The regime of military administration of Ingushetia during the period of the presence of the Volunteer Army on its territory in 1919–1920]. Vlast (in Russian) (12): 180–182. ISSN 2071-5358.
- Matiev, Timur; Muzhukhoeva, Elza (2013). "Социально-политическое развитие в XIX—начале XX века" [Socio-political development in the 19th - early 20th centuries]. In Albogachieva, Makka; Martazanov, Arsamak; Solovyeva, Lyubov (eds.). Ингуши [The Ingush]. Narody I kultury (in Russian). Moscow: Nauka. pp. 58–69. ISBN 978-5-02-038042-4.
- Mukhanov, Vadim (2020) [2012]. "НАЗРА́НЬ" [Nazrán]. Great Russian Encyclopedia (in Russian). Moscow: Great Russian Encyclopedia.
- Shnirelman, Victor (2006). Kalinin, Ilya (ed.). Быть Аланами: Интеллектуалы и политика на Северном Кавказе в XX веке [To be Alans: Intellectuals and Politics in the North Caucasus in the 20th Century] (in Russian). Moscow: NLO. pp. 1–348. ISBN 5-86793-406-3. ISSN 1813-6583.
- Ugurchieva, Khava (2006). Назрановский (Ингушский) округ: этапы образования, становления и развития (1905—1921 гг.): 1905—1921 гг. [Nazran (Ingush) okrug: stages of formation, formation and development (1905–1921): 1905–1921] (Thesis) (in Russian). Moscow: ВАК РФ.
- Volkhonskiy, Mikhail (2016). "ТЕ́РСКАЯ О́БЛАСТЬ" [Terek Oblast]. In Kravets, Sergei; et al. (eds.). Great Russian Encyclopedia. Vol. 32: Televizionnaya bashnya - Ulan-Bator (in Russian). Moscow: Great Russian Encyclopedia. ISBN 978-5-85270-369-9.
