= Agurbi Gatagazhev =

- ЙоагӀурби Гатагажев; Ӏэгъурбий Джэтэгъэжь
- Born: Agurbi (Egurbi, Yoaghurbi) Geteghezhev c. 1855
- Died: 1892 (aged 36–37); Islamovo, Russian Empire
- Occupation: Abrek (guerrilla fighter)
- Known for: North Caucasian folk hero, subject of Circassian elegies

Agurbi Gatagazhev (also known as Egurbi Geteghezhev or Yoaghurbi; Ingush: ЙоагӀурби Гатагажев; Kabardian: Ӏэгъурбий Джэтэгъэжь; c. 1855 – 1892) was a prominent Ingush abrek (outlaw/guerrilla fighter) who operated in the North Caucasus during the late 19th century. He successfully evaded the authorities of the Russian Empire for years and became a celebrated heroic figure in the folklore, epic songs, and traditions of neighboring Caucasian peoples, particularly the Kabardians, Balkars, and Karachays.

== Biography ==
=== Origin ===
Agurbi Gatagazhev was born around 1855 into the Ingush teip (clan) of Gatagazh (Gagi). Although an ethnic Ingush, his exploits left a significant mark on the oral folklore of other North Caucasian ethnic groups.

According to Kabardian folklore researchers, Caucasian oral history frequently reflected inter-ethnic solidarity and mutual sympathies between neighboring peoples, such as Russians, Balkars, Ossetians, and Chechens. Consequently, Kabardian traditional culture preserved numerous epic songs dedicated to heroes from neighboring regions, including the Chechen abrek Zelimkhan, the Balkar Gaukan, and the Ingush Agurbi Geteghezhev. The prominence of Gatagazhev in the folklore of multiple distinct Caucasian ethnic groups is cited by historians as evidence of a shared trans-Caucasian cultural community and identity during the imperial era.

=== Life and Activities ===
By 1886, Gatagazhev was officially registered as a resident of the Ingush village of Sagopshi. He gained widespread notoriety among the local population, including the Lesser Kabardians, for his immense physical strength and fearlessness.

Unlike some other insurgent groups, Gatagazhev famously conducted his raids entirely alone. His activities included the successful raiding and rustling of Kabardian, Nogai, and Chechen horses from state-controlled and wealthy estates.

Like many abreks of the period, Gatagazhev adopted a nomadic guerrilla lifestyle to resist the policies and administrative control of the Russian Imperial authorities. He utilized his deep knowledge of the mountainous terrain and tactical agility to successfully evade capture by Imperial Russian Army detachments and tsarist police forces for several years.

=== Death ===
In 1892, Gatagazhev was ambushed by imperial guards near the Kabardian village of Islamovo (modern-day Verkhny Kurp). According to local legend and oral history, he was shot in the back and killed by a guard named Elmurza Mameev.

== Cultural Legacy and Folklore ==
The memory of Agurbi Gatagazhev is preserved in the folklore of several North Caucasian ethnic groups. Most notably, he is the subject of a famous Kabardian folk elegy and weeping song titled "Dzhetaghezch-khe 'Eghwrbiy i ghybze" (Джэтэгъэжьхэ Ӏэгъурбий и гъыбзэ; The Elegy of 'Eghwrbiy Jeteghezch).

The lyrics of the elegy were originally composed by the residents of Islamovo following his death, while the musical arrangement was created by the notable Kabardian garmon player Bile Vezir. The sheet music, along with the Kabardian text and Russian translations, was formally published in a 1990 scholarly compilation by V. Kh. Beregun and Z. P. Kardengush.

The first recorded vocal performance of the elegy belongs to the prominent Circassian bard Zaramuk Kardangushev (1918–2008), and it was later re-recorded by Vladimir Baragunov (1939–1997). The song was also included in the multi-volume academic collection "Folk Songs and Instrumental Melodies of the Adyghes" (Volume III, Part II), edited by E. V. Gippius.

=== Academic Mentions ===
Gatagazhev's life, ethics, and cultural impact have been studied and analyzed in the works of several North Caucasian and Circassian scholars:

- Mugid Zagazejev covered Gatagazhev in Essays on Adyghe Folk Pedagogy (Nalchik, 1996) as an example of traditional heroism.
- Adam Gutov analyzed his role in regional interactions in Studies on Caucasian Etiquette (Nalchik, 1998).
- Amjad Jaimoukha featured the historical context of his elegy in his book Circassian Dance (2009).

== See also ==
- Abrek
- Zelimkhan
- Sulumbek of Sagopshi

== Bibliography ==
- Gippius, E. V., ed. Народные песни и инструментальные наигрыши адыгов [Folk Songs and Instrumental Melodies of the Adyghes]. Volume III, Part II. (in Russian).
- Beregun, V. Kh.; Kardengush, Z. P. (1990). Кабардинские народные песни [Kabardian Folk Songs]. pp. 114–120. (in Russian).
