= Ambush in Assa Gorge =

Ambush in the Assa Gorge (1910) a clash between the tsar's troops and the Ingush abreks, the clash took place in the area of the Assa Gorge

== Ambush ==
On September 25, 1910, Cossack soldiers under the command of the head of the Nazran district, Prince Andronnikov, were sent to the mountains of Ingushetia to capture the abrek Zelimkhan, but the abrek was not found. During the retreat to the Assa Gorge, Prince Andronnikov was killed by the Ingush abrek Posko.
