= Alansky District =

Coordinates: 43°27′N 44°34′E

Psedakhsky Okrug (1926–1931) Psedakhsky District (1931–1944) Alansky District (1944–1955)
- District
- Interactive map of Psedakhsky Okrug (1926–1931); Psedakhsky District (1931–1944); Alansky District (1944–1955)
- Country: Soviet Union
- Administrative division: Ingush AO (1926–1934); Checheno-Ingush AO (1934–1936); Checheno-Ingush ASSR (1936–1944); North Ossetian ASSR (1944–1955)
- Administrative centre: Psedakh/Alanskoe

Area
  - Total: 300 km^{2} (120 sq mi)

Population (1939)
  - Total: 6,657

Alansky District, (Note: (Russian: Аланский район, Alanskiy rayon; Ingush: Аланой шахьар, Alanoj shaꜧar; Iron Ossetic: Аланы район, Alany rajon)) known until 1931 as Psedakhsky Okrug, (Note: (Russian: Пседахский округ, Psedakhskiy okrug; Ingush: Дола-Ковна округ, Dola-Kovna okrug)) and until 1944 as Psedakhsky District, (Note: (Russian: Пседахский район, Psedakhskiy rayon; Ingush: Дола-Ковна шахьар, Dola-Kovna shaꜧar; Iron Ossetic: Пседахы район, Psedakhy rajon)) was an administrative-territorial unit part of the Ingush and Checheno-Ingush Autonomous Oblasts, and the Checheno Ingush and later North Ossetian ASSRs, which existed from 1926 to 1955. The administrative center was the village of Psedakh, which was renamed in 1944 as Alanskoe following the Deportation of the Chechens and Ingush. For a small amount on time, on January 23, 1936, the district was abolished, but on February 25 of the same year it was restored. In 1955 the district was abolished and its territory was merged into Malgobeksky District.
