= Insurgency in Ingushetia and Karabulak (1825-1826) =

- Part of the Caucasian War
| Date | May or June 1825 |
| Location | Ingushetia, Yandare |
| Result | Russian Victory |

Belligerents
| Russian Empire | (Ingushetia) Ingush |

Commanders and leaders
| (Russian Empire) A.Yermolov | (Ingushetia) Jambulat Tsechoev (executed) |

Strength
| unknown | (Ingushetia) 300 rebels |

Casualties and losses
| unknown | Heavy |
- Jambulat Tsechoev was killed with 6,000 lashes

The Ingush uprising in Yandare (1825) was an armed revolt of the Ingush people against the Russian Empire, which took place in June 1825 in the village of Yandare.

== Background ==
Yandare was founded by an officer of the Russian imperial army. The name of the village was given by Gayrbek Malsagov to perpetuate the memory of his military friend, Yandarhan Yevloyev. In 1843, these lands were indeed presented as a gift to the defender of the Fatherland, but it is not entirely correct to consider this historical event as the birth of the village. Yandare existed before, and was notorious for its regular uprisings and extremely brutal suppression. The largest of the Ingush uprisings occurred in 1825 and 1833.

== Uprising ==
1825 May – June – uprising of the residents of the village of Yandare under the leadership of the elder Jambulat Tsechoev, an associate of Beibulat Taimiev. Arrest and execution of Tsechoev

"At the beginning of the uprising, the Ingush were raised to fight by Beibulat Taimiev's friend, the brave Jambulat Tsechoev, the elder of the aul of Yandyrka, who was captured while delivering a speech in Nazran by the bailiff Tsiklaurov and executed by order of Grekov in the fortress of Grozny by the tsar's executioners. Dzhambulat was led through a thousand gauntlets six times and was hanged already dead to intimidate the people."
