= Khamkhi ambush (1946) =

Date	6 June 1946
Location	Khamkhi, Ingushetia
Result	Ingush guerrilla victory

Belligerents
(Ingushetia) Ingush guerrillas	Soviet Union NKVD/MGB operational group

Commanders and leaders
(Ingushetia) Akhmed Khuchbarov	(Soviet Union) K. Mumladze † (Soviet Union) N. Pitskhelauri †

Strength
Unknown	5

Casualties and losses
Unknown	5 killed

The Khamkhi ambush was a guerrilla operation carried out on 6 June 1946 near the village of Khamkhi in the Chechen-Ingush ASSR, Soviet Union, during the Ingush resistance against the Soviet Union. The attack was conducted by the detachment of Ingush abrek Akhmed Khuchbarov against a Soviet NKVD operational group.

== Background ==
Akhmed Khuchbarov was an Ingush abrek and guerrilla leader who waged an armed resistance against the Soviet regime. His detachment operated in the mountainous border regions of Checheno-Ingushetia and Georgia, targeting NKVD and MGB personnel involved in punitive operations against the local population.

== The ambush ==
On 6 June 1946, Khuchbarov's fighters ambushed and destroyed a five-man operational group of the NKVD near the Ingush village of Khamkhi. The group was led by security officers K. Mumladze and N. Pitskhelauri, who were carrying out a special assignment for the NKVD. The entire five-man unit was killed.

== Aftermath ==
The destruction of the Mumladze-Pitskhelauri group was one of the armed actions conducted by Khuchbarov's detachment against Soviet security forces in the post-deportation period.
