= Jambulat Tsechoev =

19th-Century North Caucasian Rebel Leader and Outlaw

- ЦIечойн Джамболт (Chechen)
- Died: 1 June 1825; Groznaya Fortress, Russian Empire (Modern-day Grozny, Chechnya)
- Cause of death: Execution
- Military career
- Allegiance: Abrek; Yandare (Until 1825); North Caucasian Imamate (29 May - 1 June 1825)
- Rank: Leader of the Insurgency in Ingushetia and Karabulak (1825); Elder of Yandare
- Nickname: Terror of all Karabulaks
- Conflicts: Caucasian War: Insurgency in the North Caucasus (1825–1826); Insurgency in Ingushetia and Karabulak (1825-1826)

Jambulat Tsechoev (Note: Russian: Джамбулат Цечоев or Джемболат Дчечоев, romanized: Jembolat Dchechoev; Chechen: ЦIечойн Джамболт, romanized: Ts'echoyn Jambolt; Also transliterated as Janbolat Chetsoyev or Djemboulat Tchetchoyeff.) was a Karabulak leader from the Tsechoy Teip, known for his association with Bey-Bulat Taymiev and his participation in the 1825–1826 insurgency in the North Caucasus. He was later executed by the Russian authorities for his involvement in the uprising.

== Biography ==
=== Prior to Bey-Bulat Taymievs Insurgency ===
Prior to Bey-Bulat Taymiev's liberation movement, Jambulat was a well-known Abrek. He was described as the "terror of the roads and a brigand without equal" and gained the nickname "Terror of all Karabulaks".
Because of his reputation and success as an abrek, Jambulat was eventually elected elder of Yandare, succeeding Jantemir Kutsurov, who was known for sheltering abreks from the Russian authorities.

In late 1824 and early 1825, tensions increased following Russian military expeditions against Chechnya and neighboring areas. According to Volkonsky, Jambulat became hostile toward the Russian Empire after the harsh punishment of his fellow tribesmen and the deaths of several of his relatives, and sought an opportunity to take revenge against the Russians.
An opportunity emerged when Avko Ungaev, one of Bey-Bulat's associates, was elected imam in 1824. Through Jambulat's connections with Bey-Bulat Taymiev, news of the new imam quickly spread through Ingushetia and among the Karabulaks. Jambulat visited Mayrtup several times and returned with reports of miracles. Because of the influence he held among the Karabulaks and even among the Nazranians, these communities were already began preparing for a movement.
Additionally, Bey-Bulat Taymiev, seeking to unite the Vainakhs, visited Ingushetia and Karabulak several times between 1823 to early 1825, negotiating with local elders about a joint uprising. Because of this, the Ingush and Karabulaks attended the congress of North Caucasian leaders on 29 May 1825.

=== Role during the Insurgency in the North Caucasus (1825–1826) ===
On 29 May 1825, a congress of North Caucasian leaders was held in Mayrtup, Chechnya. Elders, leaders, and religious figures from Chechnya, Ingushetia, Karabulak, Kabardia, Kumykia, and other areas attended the meeting. Jambulat Tsechoev arrived with a group of Ingush, who formed his retinue.

Bey-Bulat Taymiev delivered a speech in which he declared that God had taken pity on his people and had chosen an imam who would cleanse them of their sins and errors and free them from their enemies. He called on Muslims to reconcile with one another, change their way of life, follow Sharia, refrain from stealing from their fellow tribesmen, and unite for a common cause, an uprising against the Russians. Muhammad al-Quduqli was then elected imam, while Bey-Bulat was chosen as the military leader.

Messengers were sent throughout Chechnya and Ingushetia to spread news of the uprising. Jambulat Tsechoev also returned home and continued preaching among the Nazranians and Karabulaks. Because of his influence among the Ingush, he was described as “Bey-Bulat's trusted support and hope among the Ingush”.

=== Capture and Execution ===
On the night of 30 May, Prince Musa Khasaev informed General Nikolay Grekov about the congress at Mayrtup and the people who had attended it. Among the most prominent participants were Jambulat Tsechoev of Yandare and Totush and Eldar Erezhekov of Kostek, two Kumyks who helped spread unrest among the Kumyks. After reporting the two Kumyks to Dmitry Lisanevich, Grekov ordered Major Tsyklaurov, the police officer responsible for the Ingush, to arrest Jambulat.

On 1 June, while preaching to a crowd in Nazran, Jambulat Tsechoev was arrested. He was transported through Vladikavkaz and Mozdok in stocks before being taken to the Groznaya Fortress.

Jambulat was forced to run the gauntlet six times through a formation of 1,000 men, and when, under the final blows, he fell dead, his corpse was hanged as a warning to his supporters. The execution caused horror among the Ingush and Karabulaks, and many fled because of this to join Bey-Bulats growing army in Mayrtup. The death of Jambulat did not do much in stopping the growing rebellion, and the Ingush, Karabulaks and Kumyks took an active role in the uprising.

== See also ==
- Bey-Bulat Taymiev — Close friend of Jambulat Tsechoev.
- Insurgency in Ingushetia and Karabulak (1825) — Movement led by Jambulat Tsechoev.

== Sources ==
=== Bibliography ===
==== Historical Works ====
===== Russian =====
- Волконский, Н. А. (1886). "Глава II" [Chapter 2]. In Чернявский, И. С. (ed.). Война на Восточном Кавказе с 1824 по 1834 г. в связи с мюридизмом [The War in the Eastern Caucasus from 1824 to 1834 in Connection with Muridism]. Кавказский сборник (in Russian). Vol. 10. Тифлис: Типография Окружного штаба Кавказского военного округа. pp. 97–143 – via DrevLit.
- Потто, В. А. (1887). "IX. Чеченский мятеж." [9. Chechen Rebellion.]. Кавказская война в отдельных очерках, эпизодах, легендах и биографиях [The Caucasian War in Separate Essays, Episodes, Legends and Biographies] (in Russian). Vol. 2: Ермоловское время (2nd ed.). Санкт-Петербург: Издание книжного склада В. А. Березовского. pp. 143–153 – via VosLit.

===== English =====
- Baddeley, John F. (1908). "Chapter IX: 1820–1825". The Russian Conquest of the Caucasus (PDF). London, New York, Bombay, Calcutta: Longmands, Green and Co. pp. 135–151. LCCN 09002520. OCLC 4470030. OL 7004549M – via Internet Archive.

==== Modern Scholarship ====
===== Russian =====
- Гапуров, Ш. А.; Товсултанов, Р. А. (2019). "Глава 3. Народное восстание в Чечне в 1825-1826 гг. под руководством Бей-Булата Таймиева" [Chapter 3. The national uprising in Chechnya in 1825–1826 led by Bey-Bulat Taimiev]. In Магамадов, С. С. (ed.). Бей-Булат Таймиев и его время (Российско-чеченские отношения в первой трети XIX века) [Bey-Bulat Taimiev and His Time (Russian-Chechen Relations in the First Third of the 19th Century)] (in Russian). Грозный: АО «Издательско-полиграфический комплекс „Грозненский рабочий“». pp. 293–371. ISBN 978-5-4314-0391-0. OCLC 1143826539 – via Bavarian State Library.
- Хожаев, Д. А. (1998). "Тайми Биболт" [Taymi Bibolt]. In Мазаева, Тамара (ed.). Чеченцы в Русско-Кавказской войне [Chechens in the Russo-Caucasian War] (in Russian). Грозный–Санкт-Петербург: Седа. pp. 45–59. ISBN 5-85973-012-8. Archived from the original on 22 December 2014.

===== English =====
- Gammer, Moshe (2006). "Chapter 4: The Beginning of the Caucasian War". The Lone Wolf and the Bear: Three Centuries of Chechen Defiance of Russian Rule. Pitt Series in Russian and East European Studies. Pittsburgh, Pennsylvania: University of Pittsburgh Press. pp. 31–44. ISBN 0-8229-5898-8. OCLC 62329896. OL 22724688M – via Open Library.
