= Sulumbek of Sagopshi =

Ingush abrek

Sulumbek Gandaloev
- ГӀоандалой Сулумбик
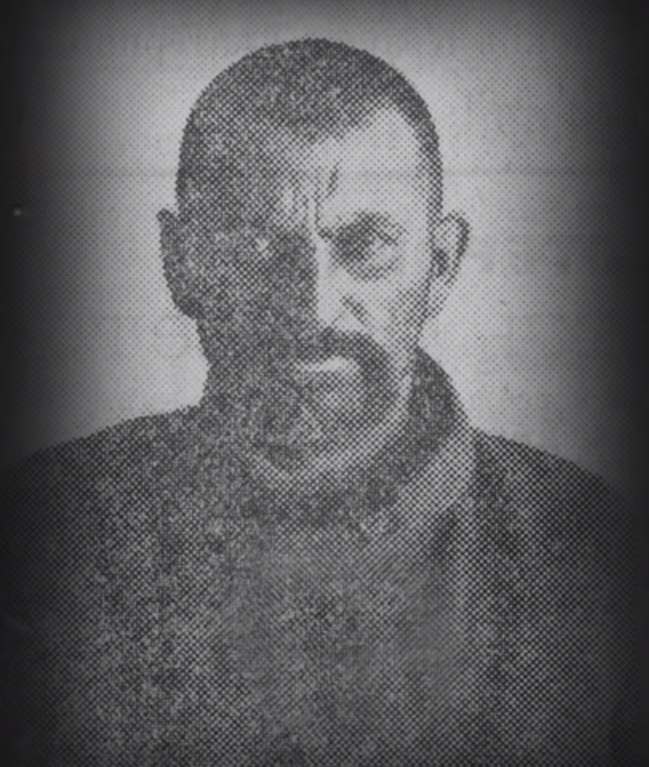
- Born: 1878; Sagopshi, Vladikavkazsky okrug, Terek Oblast, Russian Empire
- Died: 1911 (aged 32–33); Vladikavkaz, Vladikavkazsky okrug, Terek Oblast, Russian Empire
- Other names: Merciless, Menace to Tsarism
- Occupation: Abrek
- Years active: 1900—1910
- Known for: Bank and shop robberies

Sulumbek Gorovozhev (Gandaloev) or Sulumbek of Sagopshi (Note: Ingush: ГӀоандалой Гоаража Сулумбик, СоагӀапчер Сулумбик, romanized: Ghoandaloy Goarazha Sulumbik, Soaghapcher Sulumbik; Russian: Сулумбе́к Сагопши́нский, Сулумбе́к Горовоже́в, romanized: Sulumbék Sagopshínskiy, Sulumbék Gorovozhév) (c. 1878 – 1911) was an Ingush outlaw (abrek) who is known for his bank and shop robberies with his colleague and comrade Zelimkhan. The robberies were part of a conflict with the Russian authorities. He was involved in high-profile incidents associated with Zelimkhan. Sulumbek is a national hero to the Ingush people, as well as one of the most famous Caucasian abreks.

== Biography ==
=== Background ===
Sulumbek was born in c. 1878 in the village of Sagopshi, Vladikavkazsky okrug of the Terek Oblast. He was Ingush by ethnicity. (Note: Martirosian 1933, p. 166; Gritsenko 1971, p. 92; Botyakov 2004, pp. 51, 79; Bobrovnikov 2008) Sulumbek was the second child in his family. His father Gorozh was a muhacir who had emigrated to Ottoman Empire. Having returned to Ingushetia, he tried to return to Gandalbos but was denied entry by the Cossacks who settled in the village so he had to move to Sagopshi.

When the Gandaloev family had to feed a Russian bailiff, Sulumbek made fun of him by eating the whole lunch by himself. As a result, the bailiff decided to punish Sulumbek and began to write false denunciations against him to his superiors. Sulumbek could not stand it and one day, meeting a bailiff outside the village, he whipped him, for which he was immediately arrested and convicted. Sulumbek was jailed to Grozny Prison for 3 years. There he met his future comrade Zelimkhan. Together, they escaped the prison. Their acquaintance was described in the romance of Magomet Mamakaev, Zelimkhan as follows:

Don't despair, my friend – an abrek from Sagopshi, who had been sitting here for a long time, once told him [Zelimkhan] – let's better think together about how to get free – we need an underground passage.

After his escape, Sulumbek killed the bailiff and, from that moment he became an abrek.

=== Abrek activity ===
Sulumbek began his abrek activities in 1900. He led series of raids in Nalchiksky and Vladikavkazsky okrugs, during which, he engaged in skirmishes with the Cossacks and Russian Military units. His bank and shop robberies were a part of a violent struggle with the Russian authorities. After Zelimkhan's father and brother Sultamurat, as well as the abreks of his cap, were killed by the Benoevs, his younger brother, Ayub and Sulumbek remained with him for the longest time.

Sulumbek's comrade Zelimkhan received an insulting letter from Verbitsky, former ataman of the Kizlyarsky otdel. Because of that as well as in retaliation for the shooting of Chechens at the Gudermes bazaar and for the ruin of the Ingush village, Tsorkh, he decided to kill him. However, he was talked out from this. Zelimkhan instead decided to rob the Kizlyar treasury which at the same time would disgrace Verbitsky. Like typically, Zelimkhan warned the Russian authorities about his intentions beforehand. Preparing for the robbery, Zelimkhan created two detachments— the Chechen detachment in the village of Novye Atagi, led by Ayub Tomaev, and the Ingush one in the Nazran okrug, led by Sulumbek. The group successfully robbed the Treasury on 27 March. During the robbery, Ayub and Sulumbek killed 4 Russian officers and 7 soldiers.

=== Death ===
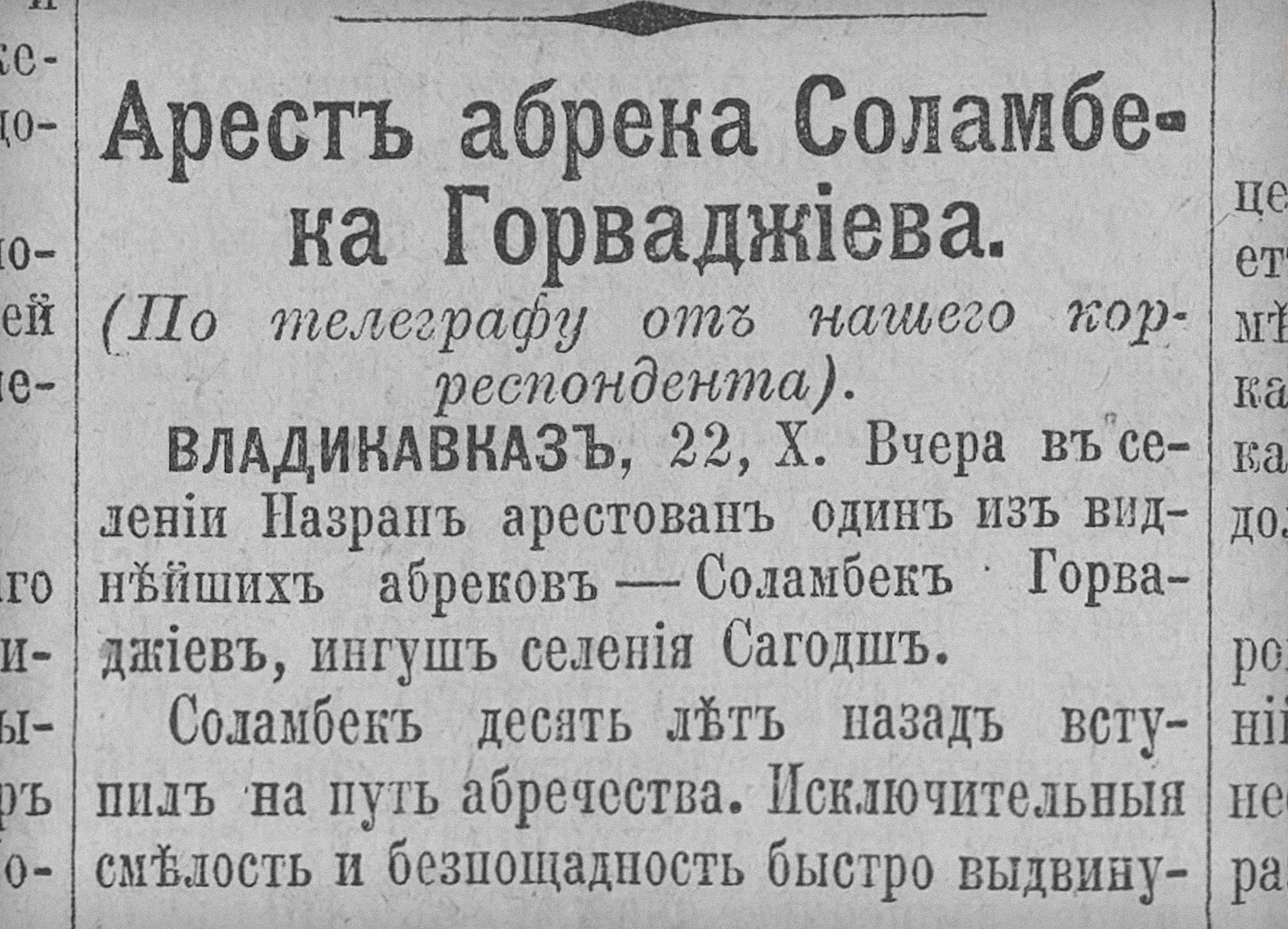
The Russian newspaper Russkoe slovo reporting on Sulumbek's arrest.

Russian authorities threatened to destroy his native village; having learned this, Sulumbek, through intermediaries, negotiated with the Russian authorities and agreed to surrender. He surrendered on the condition that he would be shot and not hanged, since a death by hanging was, for a Caucasian mountaineer, considered shameful and unacceptable. When such guarantees were promised to him, Sulumbek surrendered to the authorities on 4 November 1910. However, during the trial, the court sentenced him to death by hanging. The Russian newspaper Kavkazskaya Kopeyka described the last minutes of Sulumbek's life:

At the sight of the gallows and in general the whole gloomy, ominous situation, speaking of the inevitable proximity of the fatal end, Garavodzhev, as eyewitnesses say, retained a rare outward calm and self-control, and some kind of mysterious, either sarcastic or contemptuous smile was always playing on his thin lips [...] Then he calmly, without haste and without showing the slightest emotion at all, climbed onto the fatal platform and, when the executioner threw a noose around his neck, he himself slid off the stool [...] The last wish of this Zelimkhanovite was that his hands would not be tied and a shroud bag would not be put on him. "I give you my abrek's word of honor that I will not cause any trouble to anyone," he assured his superiors. But, of course, he was denied this.

— Kavkazskaya Kopeyka

According to historian Petimat Akieva, the death of Sulumbek carried "the nature of political protest and struggle against power", which gave "[a]breks in the eyes of the people [...] an aura of national heroes".

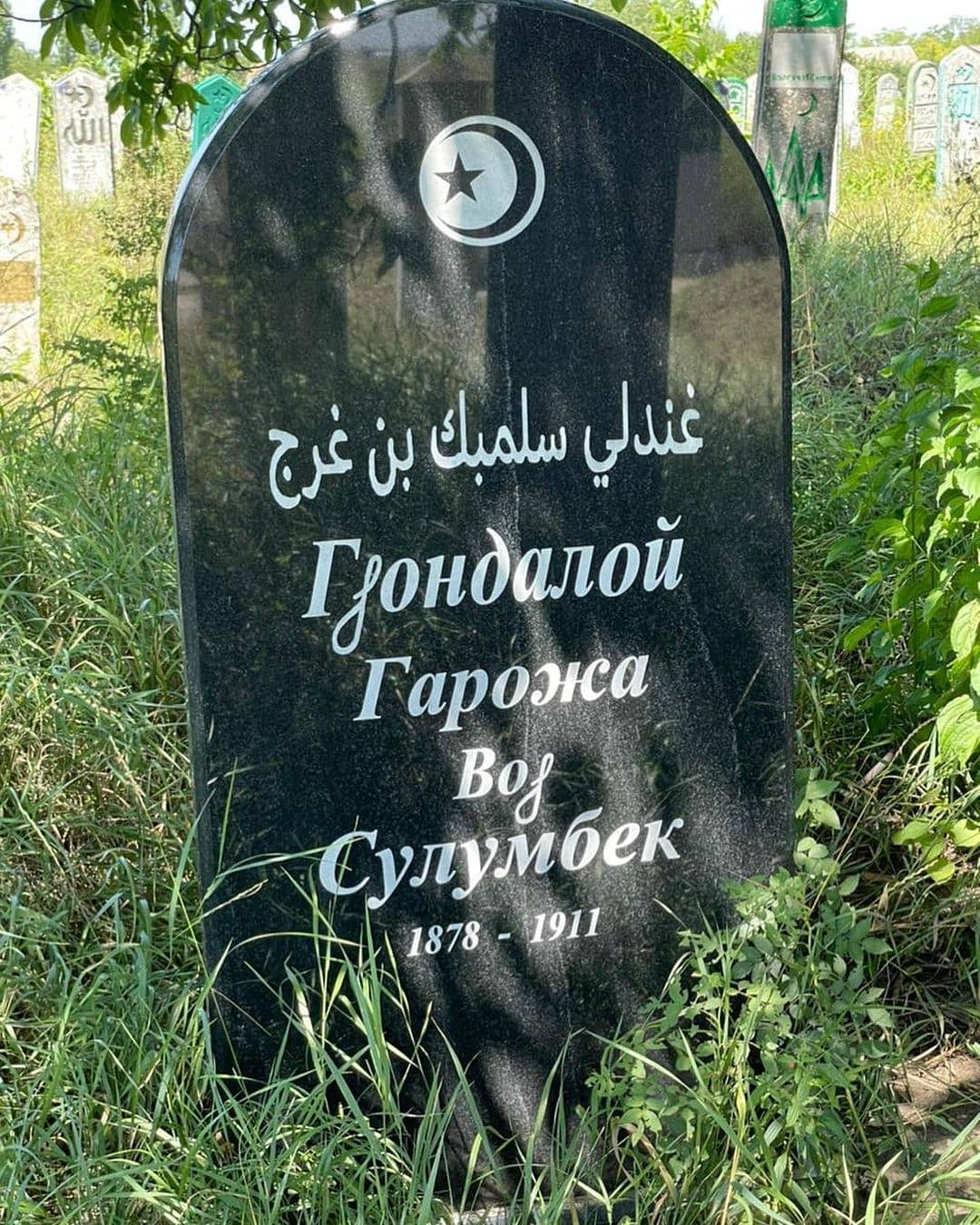
Grave of Sulumbek.

== In culture ==
Sulumbek is considered a national hero to the Ingush people, as well as a famous Caucasian outlaw.

In 2011, the Ingush writer Issa Kodzoev wrote a romance titled "Sulumbek Sagopshinsky". In 2019, director Leyla Gagieva shot the documentary film "Ingush Papakha", the first part of which is called "Abrek Sulumbek" and, among other things, describes the life and work of the abrek. In the same year, A. Sakharov's published collection "Legends and Tales of the Ingush Mountains" included a poem by the author dedicated to Sulumbek.

Ossetian-born Soviet writer Dzakho Gatuev wrote about Sulumbek in 1926 as follows:

The most daring raids of Zelimkhan are associated with the name of Sulumbek, while Zelimkhan inspired the gang with his religious and political popularity. Sulumbek produced a magical effect on the gang with his fearlessness and insane courage. The abreks followed him to almost certain death, to the very center of the city, surrendering into the hands of the troops. In addition to courage, Sulumbek was distinguished by extraordinary willpower, the ability to not get lost in moments of danger and, most importantly, mercilessness. Sulumbek's insane courage is an ideal that every abrek would like to achieve. In a word, Zelimkhan and Sulumbek mutually complemented each other.

=== Folksongs about Sulumbek ===
The Chechen illi "Asir-Abrek. Chechen song", published in 1924 mentions Sulumbek. In the Ingush illis, Sulumbek is glorified. In one of the illis, hidden regret is expressed that the Ingush still do not have effective laws that make it possible to really judge the deeds of a person:

The fearless wolf — Salambek Sagopshinsky … Salambek rode into the heart of the city on a black horse...

Salambek killed the bailiff Boguslavsky. Salambek attacked the Grozny station. Salambek also attacked the Kizlyar bank. Salambek himself came to his death. Fearless wolf — Salambek Sagopshinsky …

…The general promised to shoot Salambek! This does not mean that he will shoot with his own hands. When even a general promises death, he promises it through the court. No matter how great a general is, greater than the greatest general is the royal law, whose books are like seventy-seven Korans.

— Ingush illi (heroic-epic song)

== Sources ==
=== English sources ===
- Bobronikov, V. (August 8, 2007). "Bandits and the State: Designing a "Traditional" Culture of Violence in the North Caucasus". In Burbank, J.; Hagen, M.; Anatolyi, R. (eds.). Russian Empire: Space, People, Power, 1700-1930. Indiana-Michigan Series in Russian and East European Studies. Bloomington: Indiana University Press. pp. 1–538. ISBN 9780253219114.
- Bobrovnikov, V. O. (2008). "Abrek". In Fleet, Kate; Krämer, Gudrun; Matringe, Denis; Nawas, John; Rowson, Everett (eds.). Encyclopaedia of Islam (3rd ed.). Brill Online. ISSN 1873-9830.

=== Russian sources ===
- Akieva, Petimat (2019). "Геройство, кшедшее в историю" [Heroicity lost in history (based on materials from the Abreks in Checheno-Ingushetia)]. In Almazov, Issa; Barakhoeva, Nina (eds.). 75 лет депортации ингушского народа 1944–1957 гг. [75 years old deportation of the Ingush people in 1944–1957] (in Russian). Magas, Ingushetia: IngNII im. Ch. E. Akhrieva. pp. 50–66.
- Anchabadze, George (2001). Gelashvili, N. V. (ed.). Вайнахи [Vainakhs] (in Russian). Tbilisi: Caucasian House.
- Arapov, D. Yu.; Babich, I. L.; Bobrovnikov, V. O.; Gakkaev, J.; Kazharov, V. Kh.; Krishtopa, A. E.; Solovyeva, L. T.; Sotavov, N. A.; Tsutsiev, A. A. (2007). Bobrovnikov, V. O.; Babich, I. L.; Redkollegiya serii "Okrainy Rossiyskoy imperii" (eds.). Северный Кавказ в составе Российской империи [North Caucasus as part of the Russian Empire]. Okrainy Rossiyskoy imperii (in Russian). Moscow: NLO. pp. 1–460. ISBN 978-5867935290.
- "Арест абрека Соламбека Горваджиева" [The arrest of abrek Solambek Gorvadzhiev]. Russkoe slovo (in Russian). No. 244. Moscow: A. A. Aleksandrov. 1910-11-05.
- Arsharuni, A. (1930). "Ингушская литература" [Ingush literature]. Literaturnaya Entsoklopedia (in Russian). Vol. 4. Moskva: Izd-vo Kom. Akad. col. 496–497.
- Ashakhanov, Tagib (2023). "«Гроза Царизма» Сулумбек Сагопшинский" [The Menace of Tsarism: Sulumbek of Sagopshi]. Великие Имена Кавказа [Great Names of the Caucasus] (in Russian). Makhachkala: Avtor. pp. 1–239.
- Bagration, Dmitry (1914). Подвиг терского казака, ныне Дагестанского конного полка поручика Кибирова, уничтожившого абрека Зелимхана [The feat of the Terek Cossack, now the Dagestan Cavalry Regiment of Lieutenant Kibirov, who destroyed the abrek Zelimkhan] (in Russian). Petrograd: T-vo R. Golike i A. Vilborg.
- Bazorkin, M. M. (2002) [1965]. Kurkiev, A. B. (ed.). История происхождения ингушей [History of the origin of the Ingush] (PDF) (in Russian). Nalchik: El-Fa. pp. 1–290. ISBN 5-88195-554-4.
- Bobrovnikov, Vladimir (2000). "Абреки и государство: Культура насилия на Кавказе" [Abreks and the State: The Culture of Violence in the Caucasus]. Acta Eurasica (in Russian) (1): 19–46.
- Botyakov, Yu. M. (2004). Абреки на Кавказе: социо-культурный аспект явления [Abreks in the Caucasus: socio-cultural aspect of the phenomenon] (in Russian). SPb.: Peterburgskoe vostokovedinie. pp. 1–208. ISBN 9785858032830.
- Dolgieva, M. B.; Kartoev, M. M.; Kodzoev, N. D.; Matiev, T. Kh. (2013). Kodzoev, N. D.; et al. (eds.). История Ингушетии [History of Ingushetia] (4th ed.). Rostov-Na-Donu: Yuzhnyy izdatelsky dom. pp. 1–600. ISBN 978-5-98864-056-1.
- Gandaloev, A. Sh. (2014-11-28). "Неустрашимость и безумная отвага" [Fearlessness and crazy courage]. Serdalo (in Russian).
- Gritsenko, N. P. (1971). Классовая борьба крестьян в чечено-ингушетии на рубеже XIX-XX веков [The class struggle of peasants in Chechen-Ingushetia at the turn of the 19th-20th centuries] (in Russian). Grozny: ChIKI.
- Iden, M. (2019-09-07). "В Магасе прошел турнир по метанию ножей, посвященный народному герою Сулумбеку Сагопшинскому" [A knife throwing tournament dedicated to the national hero Sulumbek Sagopshinsky was held in Magas]. Ingushetia (in Russian). GAU redaktsiya gazety "Ingushetia".
- "Казнь "правой руки" Зелимхана" [Execution of the "right hand" of Zelimkhan]. Kavkazskaya kopeyka (in Russian). Baku. 1911-08-25.
- Khamchiev, Sultan (1995–1996). Barakhoev, M. S. (ed.). "Сулумбек Горовожев — герой из легенды" [Sulumbek Gorovozhev, hero from a legend]. Serdalo (in Russian). No. 46–49, 1–2. Nalchik: GP KBR "Respublikanskiy poligrafkombinat im. Revolyutsii 1905 g.".
- Kodzoev, Issa (2011). Сулумбек Сагошинский [Sulumbek of Sagopshi] (PDF) (in Russian). Piligrim. pp. 1–318. ISBN 9785989931866.
- Курылев, В. П.; Музей антропологии и этнографии им. Петра Великого (Кунсткамера); Карпов, Ю. Ю (2002). Лавровские (среднеазиатско-кавказские) чтения 2000-2001 гг.: краткое содержание докладов [Lavrov (Central Asian-Caucasian) readings 2000-2001: summary of reports] (in Russian). СПб.: Российская академия наук, Музей антропологии и этнографии им. Петра Великого (Кунсткамера). pp. 1–150. ISBN 9785884310735.
- Malsagov, A. O. (1983). Alieva, A. I. (ed.). Сказки и легенды ингушей и чеченцев [Tales and legends of the Ingush and Chechens] (in Russian). Moscow: Nauka.
- Martirosian, Georgi (1933). История Ингушии [History of Ingushiya] (in Russian). Ordzhonikidze: Serdalo.
- Pavlova, O. S. (2012). Ингушский этнос на современном этапе: черты социально-психологического портрета [The Ingush ethnos at the present stage: features of the socio-psychological portrait] (in Russian). Moscow: Forum. ISBN 9785911346652. OCLC 798995782.
- Sakharov, A. A. (2019). Легенды и сказания ингушских гор [Legends and tales of the Ingush mountains] (in Russian). Москва: Fest Prezent Kompani. pp. 1–96. ISBN 978-5-9500432-1-5.
- Schmidt, Оtto, ed. (1926). Большая советская энциклопедия [Great Soviet Encyclopedia] (in Russian). Vol. 1: А — Аколла (1st ed.). Moscow: Great Soviet Encyclopedia. pp. 1–436.
- Zyazikov, Мurat (2004). Традиционная культура ингушей: история и современность [Traditional culture of the Ingush: history and modernity] (in Russian). Rostov-on-Don: SKNTs VSh. pp. 1–312. ISBN 5-87872-302-6.
