= Akhmed Khuchbarov =

Ingush abrek

- Хучбарнаькъан Ахьмад
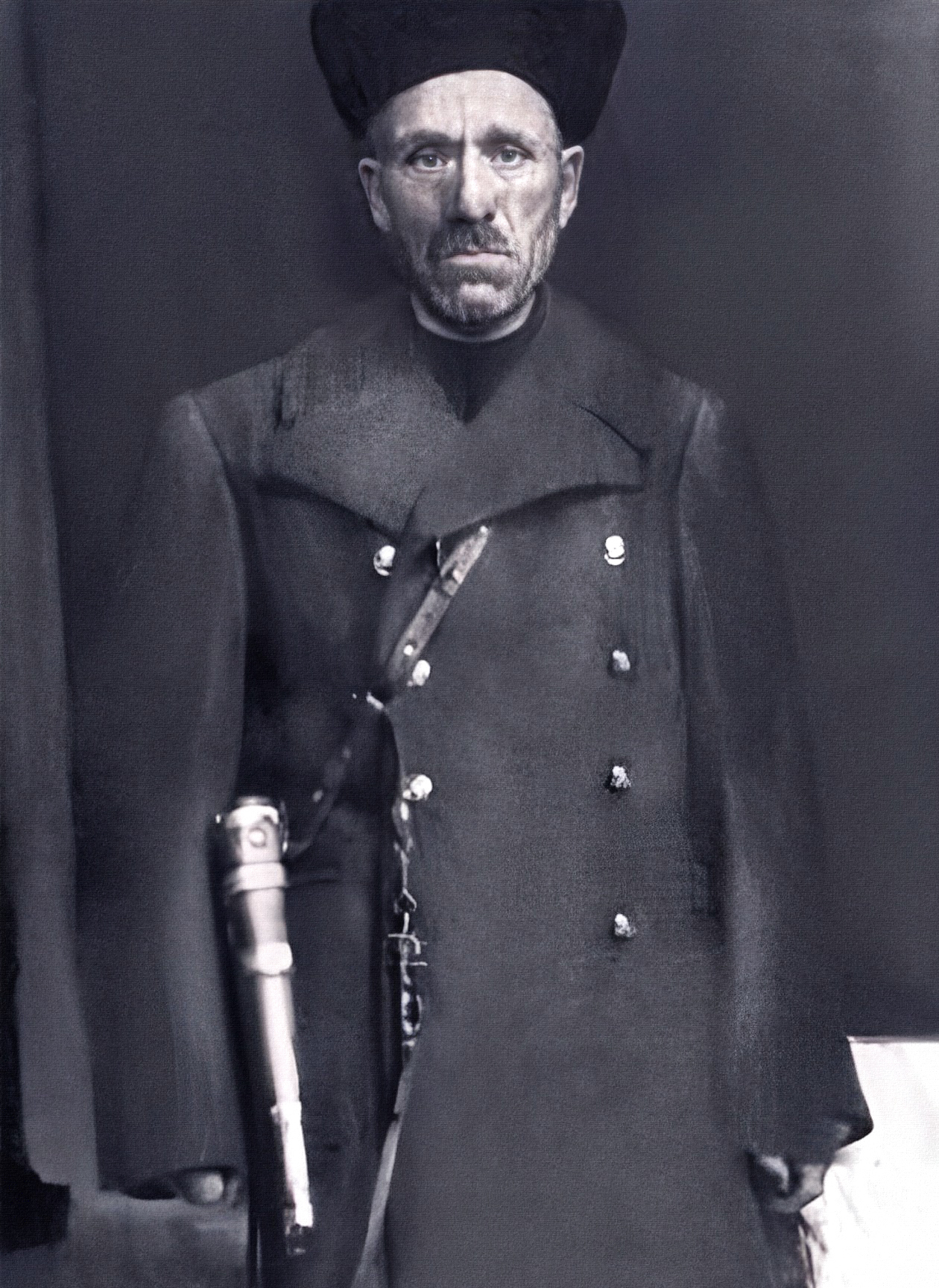
- Born: 1894; Gul, Sunzhensky Otdel, Terek Oblast, Russian Empire
- Died: 1956 (aged 61–62); Tbilisi, Georgian SSR, Soviet Union
- Other name: Mountain Wolf
- Occupations: Abrek and Guerrilla fighter
- Years active: 1929–1956
- Known for: Leading an Ingush resistance against the Soviet Union

Akhmed Osievich Khuchbarov (Note: Russian: Ахмед Осиевич Хучбаров, Ingush: Хучбарнаькъан Оси воӏ Ахьмад, romanized: Khuchbarnäqʼan Osi vo' Ahmad) (1894–1956) was an Ingush abrek, guerrilla fighter and warlord from the Merzhoy Teip who led an Ingush resistance against the Soviet regime for 27 years up until his death in 1956. Akhmed made numerous operations and attacks on NKVD and KGB members, avenging the deported Ingush, thus being considered a national hero to the Ingush people.

== Early life ==
Akhmed Khuchbarov was born in 1894 in the village of Gul, Sunzhensky Otdel of the Terek Oblast, and he was Ingush by ethnicity. He is a representative of the Guloy clan.

While living in Angusht in 1929, Akhmed was affected by Dekulakization like many people in Soviet Union. He had a conflict between his wife (who was from the Torshkhoy) due to him not wanting her to join Vladikavkaz Soviet Party School. (Note: There was campaign that had begun in Ingushetia to involve mountaineer women in the construction of communism.) Her cousin wanted instead, so, there was a violent quarrel between Akhmed and him. During which, Akhmed shot the cousin and wounded his leg, which forced him to go on the run as the Soviet court would have sentenced him a capital punishment. Khuchbarov did not want to become a victim of the Soviet Policies, which according to him, destroyed the traditional image and way of life of the Ingush. Soon the Akhmed's family broke up and he went on the path of abrechestvo.

== Abrechestvo ==
=== Pre-Deportation time ===
Khuchbarov's departure as an abrek in 1929 was due to the circumstances of his life (i.e. he had to run from the Soviet court), however soon he started to consistently resist to the new policies and practices implanted by Soviet Union in the late 20s - early 30s in the North Caucasus.

On August 22, 1942, the 29th topographic detachment of the Transcaucasian Front carried out reconnaissance of the area in the area of the villages of Guli and Lyazhgi, Galashkinsky District, on the eve of the deportation of the Ingush. While in their mission, the detachment was ambushed by Khuchbarov, and officers and several soldiers-photographers numbering seven people were all killed.

After 1942, when the Germans retreated from North Caucasus, Khuchbarov's detachment became numerous and highly professional in terms of waging war with the operational groups and fighter detachments of the UNKVD in the mountains. In his detachment were: Soltmurad Khuchbarov, Abubakar Khuchbarov, (Note: Abubakar Khuchbarov was the nephew of Akhmed Khuchbarov, who was in 1944 "hooked/recruited" by the NKVD of the Grozny Oblast after his arrest.) Bati and Soip Khashievs (or Khanievs), Ibi Alkhastov, Badafar Kurbanov, Malyshev Alexander, Magomed Israilov (son of Khasan Israilov), (Note: Akhmed Khuchbarov and Khasan Israilov had a common struggle as they both were humanly and ideologically connected with each other. Similarly Khuchbarov also had common military goals and joint actions with the legendary Khasukha Magomadov (who outlived Akhmed by 20 years) and Abumuslim Didiev.) Musa Khunarikov, Choka and Seyd Khozhaevs, Akhmadov Tatar, Murtaz (surname unknown), Payzulla (Akkin) and lastly an 18-year-old Georgian (name unknown).

In June 1943 in the village Guli of the Galashkinsky District, the senior detective of the department for combating banditry of the NKVD of the Checheno-Ingush ASSR, junior lieutenant and chekist - Nazirov Mukhadin Nazirovich was killed by Akhmed Khuchbarov.

In 1943, in the mountains of the Akhmeta region, Khuchbarov's fighters managed to steal several thousand sheep and killed three soldiers of the 236th regiment of the internal troops of the NKVD and two policemen during a shootout. In the same year, on a farm located in Dzharago, then Alkhalkhevsky District, Khuchbarov's fighters opened a fire on a detachment of internal troops. Having shot 23 soldiers and made an armed raid on summer pastures, they stole more than two thousand sheep belonging to collective farms and state farms.

=== Deportation time ===
Khuchbarov waged a war with the special units of the NKVD, which targeted and "cleansed" remaining Ingush ("anti-Soviet element") in the mountains of Ingushetia after the deportation of Ingush. About this episode, V. Shaduri writes as follows:

Khuchbarov Akhmed, with his associates and the bandits most devoted to him, specifically tracked down the employees of the NKVD who participated in the fight against banditry, and took measures to commit their murders.

On June 9, 1944, Khuchbarov's fighters destroyed the NKVD task force under the leadership of Lieutenant Golik at the village of Malaria of the Khamkhin village council, who "cleaned up" the Ingush who remained in the mountains after the deportation. The fulfillment of the task of the Golik group consisted in the murder of an old man Abukar Hunievich Bochalov and his son, a youngster. Having killed them, the Chekists took their cut off heads with them for reporting in the office. Khuchbarov and his comrades shot the Chekists and after putting the heads back to the disfigured troupes of father and son, buried them according to the Muslim ritual. Major General V. Shaduri said the following about this:

[...] all 5 people were brutally killed. Killed were the commander of the 2nd platoon of the 9th company of the 236th rifle regiment of the NKVD troops junior lieutenant Golik Grigory Mikhailovich, machine gunner Kozlov Ivan Semenovich, soldiers Dmitry Trofimov, Aleksandr Ikryannikov and Genady Suvorov.

Such punitive actions of the NKVD were carried out by a special decision of the government and 19,000 operatives of the People's Commissariat of Internal Affairs and up to 100,000 officers and soldiers of the NKVD troops were involved in them. By special order of Lavrentiy Beria, in order to eliminate "banditry" in the deported regions of Ingushetia and Chechnya, the NKVD troops created military garrisons, reconnaissance and operational groups were formed.

On June 6, 1946, Khuchbarov's fighters destroyed a NKVD task force of 5 people near the Ingush village of Khamkhi. On the territory of the Akhmeta region of Georgia, Khuchbarov's detachment also liquidated employees of the regional department of internal affairs, in the mountains of Khevsureti - employees and informers of state security.

In May 1947, Khuchbarov's fighters in the Dusheti region of Georgia destroyed a group of police officers and their accomplices.

The Soviets failed to arrest Akhmed Khuchbarov during the filtration and investigation of 1944-1948s, however the bodies of the Ministry of Internal Affairs of the Grozny region managed to detain 2213 Chechens and Ingush living in the mountainous area of Checheno-Ingushetia.

In 1948, in the Prigorodny District, Khuchbarov's detachment was ambushed by a large detachment of the NKVD. Khuchbarov's detachment managed to break out of the encirclement, but in the battle, Akhmed's cousin Soltmurad was killed by the NKVD. He died, having managed to read the dying prayer-yasiin, which he knew by heart.

As a result of bold raids in the mountains of the Akhmeta and Akhalkhevsky regions of Georgia, Khuchbarov's detachment destroyed the punitive detachment of the NKVD of 23 people and a task force of 5 people.

In January 1949, one of the groups of Khuchbarov's detachment, led by Ibi Alkhastov in Upper Khevsureti, after conducting a bold raid, destroyed the so-called "activists" and KGBists. To capture Alkhastov's group of 5 people, a special group was created, headed by the head of one of the district departments of Tbilisi, Khorguani, a highlander from Svaneti. Alkhastov's detachment was surrounded during the night in a hut and died in a hot battle.

The researcher S. Khamchiev makes a conclusion based on facts of the activities of Khuchbarov's rebels that:

[...] the actions of the Khuchbarovites were a direct result of the deportation and atrocities of the punitive authorities", therefore "we do not know of such a case that he and his comrades offended the civilian population. But on the other hand, they fought furiously with the chastisers.

From the text of V. Shaduri, we learn that the post-war struggle of Khuchbarov's detachment with the punitive system of the USSR on a small mountain patch was essentially a continuation of the war of the state security agencies with the insurgent movement: from 1944 to 1953, Akhmed Khuchbarov's fighters carried out about 30 operations against punishers from the troops of the NKVD and the NKGB. Personally, Akhmed Khuchbarov has killed at least 100 special service operatives over the years.

For two whole years, from 1953 to 1955, under the leadership of the KGB of the USSR, a special operation was developed in the Ministry of Internal Affairs of Georgia "to eliminate the socially dangerous criminal and political gang of A. Khuchbarov." The special plan set specific tasks for the KGB and the Ministry of Internal Affairs of Georgia, that is, collection and processing of available and incoming information about Akhmed Khuchbarov and his detachment; recruitment in the Akhmeta, Dusheti districts and the former Chechen-Ingushetia of agents for the corresponding work on the introduction of Khuchbarov into the detachment; search and specific processing of intermediary parliaments for negotiations (for the purpose of deception) with Khuchbarov himself, as well as with Khasukha Magomadov, Abumuslim Didiev, who calmly crossed the borders of Chechnya, Ingushetia and Georgia for military joint operations.

== Capture and death ==
In September 1954, in Tbilisi, under the leadership of the Minister of Internal Affairs of the Georgian SSR, A.N. Inauri (who became the chairman of the KGB under the Council of Ministers of the Georgian SSR after this operation), the plan for the liquidation of Khuchbarov's detachment was approved. The group of "liquidators" included V. I. Shaduri - head of the department of the KGB of Georgia, A. Kvasheli - deputy minister of internal affairs, G. Guchmazashvili - head of the criminal investigation department of the Police department of the Ministry of Internal Affairs of the Georgian SSR. In 1953 Abu-Bakr Khuchbarov was brought from a Kazakh prison. He negotiated with Akhmed for a whole year and was properly processed by the organs beforehand. In January 1955, Akhmed Khuchbarov trusting, met with V. I. Shaduri for negotiations, where he was fraudulently captured.

“To somehow make sure of my sincerity, Khuchbarov offered to take an oath on the Koran. Of course, I didn't lose anything. The main thing was to tear Khuchbarov away from his lair and deprive him of his invulnerability. Before taking an oath on the Koran, I warned my comrades to keep themselves serious, otherwise inappropriate laughter could ruin everything.”

— Colonel of the KGB V. I. Shaduri

The investigation went on for a year. More than 30 Ingush were brought from Kazakhstan to the trial, which took place in Tbilisi in 1956. Akhmed Khuchbarov was convicted of sabotage by the military tribunal of the Transcaucasian Military District and shot.

== Bibliography ==
- Anchabadze, G. Z. (2001). Gelashvili, N. V. (ed.). Вайнахи [Vainakhs] (PDF) (in Russian). Tbilisi: Kavkazskiy dom. pp. 1–97.
- Ashakhanov, Tagib (2023). "«Горный волк» Ахмед Хучбаров" [The Mountain Wolf: Akhmed Khuchbarov]. Великие Имена Кавказа [Great Names of the Caucasus] (in Russian). Makhachkala: Avtor. pp. 1–239.
- Yandieva, M. (2004). Ингушское сопротивление: Ахмед Хучбаров в контексте времени [Ingush resistance: Akhmed Khuchbarov in the context of time] (in Russian). Nazran; Moskva.
- Pavlova, O. (2012). Ингушский этнос на современном этапе [The Ingush Ethnos in the Modern Era] (PDF) (in Russian). Moscow: Forum. p. 384. ISBN 978-5-91134-665-2.
- Patiev, Ya. S. (2004). Ингуши депортация, возвращение, реабилитация, 1944-2004: документы, материалы, комментарии [Ingush deportation, return, rehabilitation, 1944-2004: documents, materials, comments] (in Russian). Magas, Ingushetia: Serdalo. pp. 1–606. ISBN 9785944520180.
- Ibragimov, M. M. (2018). Борьба НКВД с чеченскими повстанцами после ликвидации ЧИАССР [The struggle of the NKVD with the Chechen rebels after the liquidation of the CHIASSR] (in Russian). Grozny: Akademiya nauk ChR. pp. 178–186 (1–9 as PDF).
- Ashakhanov, Т.; Nutsalkhanov, Р. (2021). Великие имена Кавказа [Great names of the Caucasus]. Makhachkala. pp. 1–239.
- Шадури, В. (1985). Инаури, А. Н. (ed.). Щит — надежный, меч — острый: Чекисты Грузии на страже завоеваний Великого Октября [The shield is reliable, the sword is sharp: Chekists of Georgia on guard of the gains of the Great October Revolution] (in Russian). Тбилиси: Сабчота Сакартвело.
- Хамчиев, С. А. (2000). Возвращение к истокам: история Ингушетии в лицах и фактах (in Russian). Саратов.
