= Psedakh =

Rural locality in Ingushetia

Psedakh Пседах
- Selo

Other transcription(s)
  - Ingush: Долакоа (Note: • Commonly mentioned as 'Dolakoa' (Ingush: Долакоа), however the village was sometimes mentioned as 'Duola-Koa' (Ingush: Дуола-Коа) or 'Dola-Koa' (Ingush: Дола-Коа).)
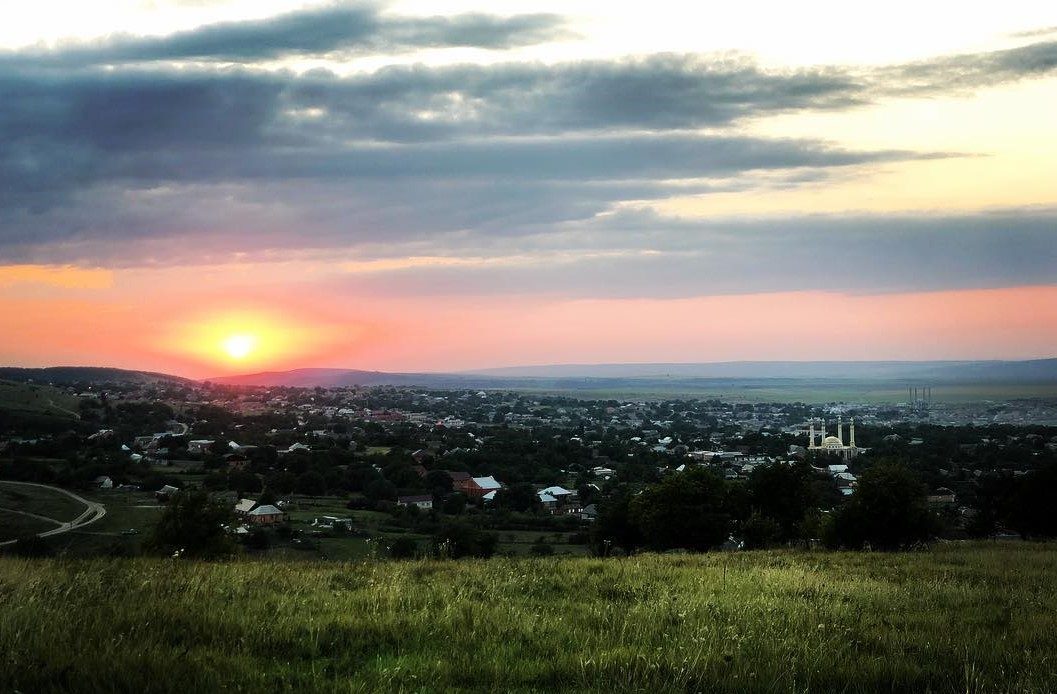
- View of Psedakh
- Interactive map of Psedakh
- Location of Psedakh Psedakh (Republic of Ingushetia)
- Coordinates: 43°28′06″N 44°34′14″E
- Country: Russia
- Federal subject: Ingushetia
- Founded: 1820
- Elevation: 460 m (1,510 ft)

Population (2010 Census)
  - Total: 4,606
  - Estimate (2021): 6,066 (+31.7%)

Administrative status
  - Subordinated to: Malgobeksky District
- Time zone: UTC+3 (MSK)
- Postal code: 386332
- OKTMO ID: 26615410101

Psedakh (Note: Russian: Пседах; Ingush: Долакоа, romanized: Dolakoa; Chechen: Доьлака, romanized: Dölaka) is a rural locality (a selo) in the Malgobeksky District of the Republic of Ingushetia, Russia. It forms the municipality of the rural settlement of Psedakh as the only settlement in its composition.

== Etymology ==
Psedakh is a distorted version of the toponym, going back to the Kabardian Psydakhe (Kabardian: псы дахэ) which means "beautiful water/river".

== History ==
The village was founded in 1820 on the territory of Little Kabardia. The land was purchased from the Little Kabardian princes Bekovich-Cherkassky and subsequently, in the 1860s, it was added to the Nazranian society.

In 1926, the village was the center of the Achalukovsky District of the Ingush Autonomous Oblast and at the same time the center of the Psedakh village council which in addition to Psedakh, also included farms of Vostochny Sovetsky, Doholber, Zapadny Sovetsky, and Mazaevsky which arose in 1920–1921. In the village itself, there were 344 households (325 peasants and 19 non-peasant), and 1802 people lived (884 males and 918 females).

Until 1944, the village was the administrative center of the Psedakhsky District of the Chechen-Ingush ASSR. In 1944, after the Deportation of the Chechens and Ingush and the abolition of the Chechen-Ingush Autonomous Soviet Socialist Republic, the village of Psedakh was renamed Alanskoe. After the restoration of Chechen-Ingush autonomy in 1957, the settlement was returned to its former name – Psedakh.

== Geography ==
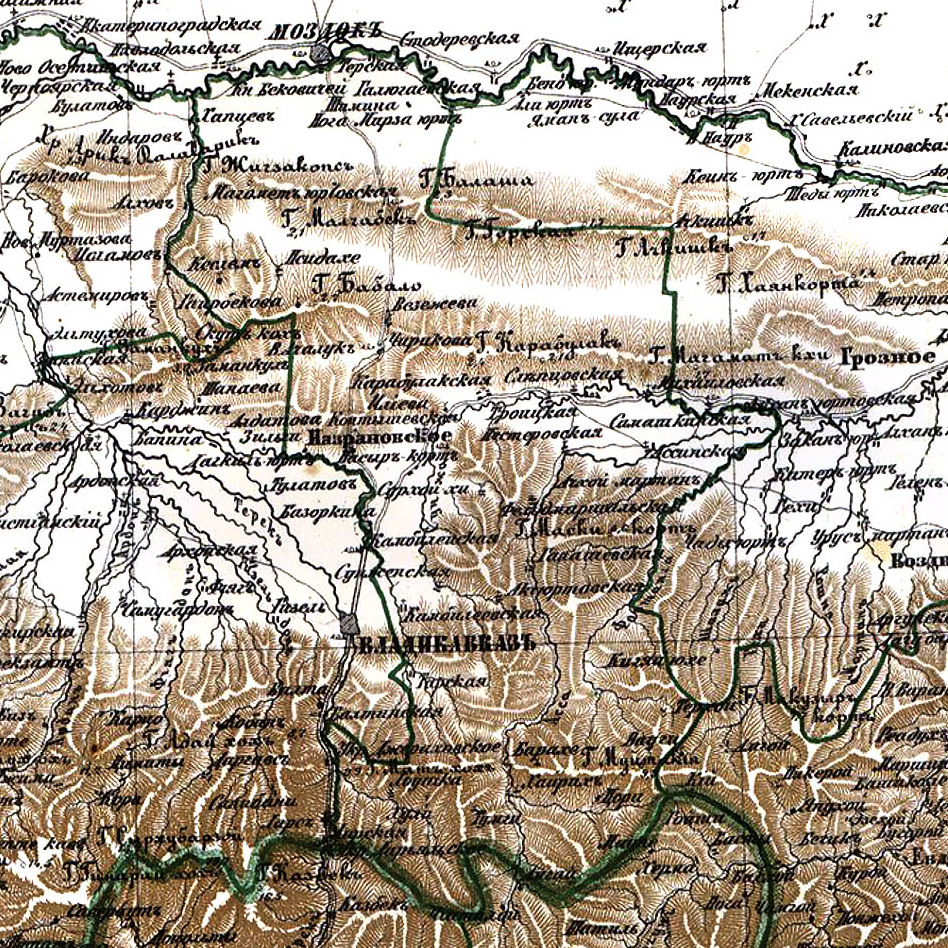
The village of Psedakh on the map of the Ingush district in 1869.

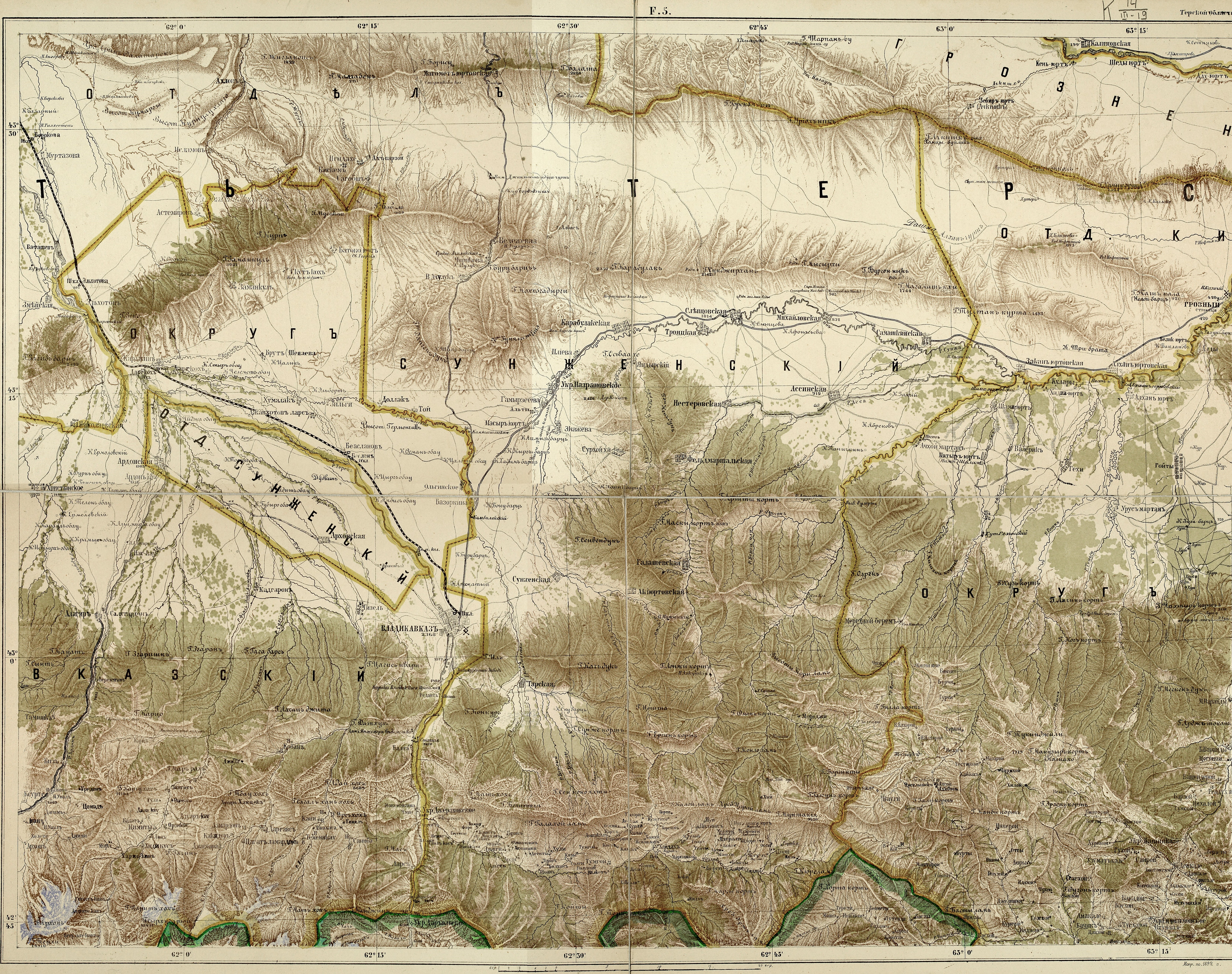
The village Psedakh on the map of Sunzhensky (Ingush) otdel in 1892

The village is located in the western part of the Malgobeksky District and is located south of the district center of the city of Malgobek, 35 km in a straight line northwest of the city of Magas, the capital of Ingushetia. In the northeast, the village of Sagopshi adjoins Psedakh, in the west – the village of Inarki, the nearest settlement in the southeast is Geyrbek-Yurt, in the southwest — Batako (North Ossetia).

The settlement is located at the northern foot of the Sunzha Range, in the foothill zone. To the south of the village rises Mount Musakai (872.5 m), and to the southeast – Mount Babalo (818.1 m). Altitude fluctuations in the village are 420–540 meters above sea level.

The hydrographic network is represented by the small river Psedakh, which originates on the northern slope of Mount Musakai and flows through the village. To the west of it, also on the northern slope of the Sunzha Range, the Zhoronka river originates.

The climate is moderately cold humid (Dfb). The amplitude of air temperature ranges from an average of +21.7°С in July to an average of −3.5°С in January. The average annual rainfall is 677 mm. The main amount of precipitation falls between April and August.

== Bibliography ==
- Мальсагов, З. К. (1963). Оздоева, Ф. (ed.). Грамматика ингушского языка [Grammar of the Ingush language] (in Ingush and Russian). Vol. 5 (2nd ed.). Грозный: Чечено-Ингушское Книжное Издательство. pp. 1–164.
- Оздоев, И. А. (1980). Оздоева, Ф. Г.; Куркиев, А. С. (eds.). Русско-ингушский словарь: 40 000 слов [Russian-Ingush dictionary: 40,000 words] (in Ingush and Russian). Москва: Русский язык. pp. 1–832.
- Барахоева, Н. М.; Кодзоев, Н. Д.; Хайров, Б. А. (2016). Ингушско-русский словарь терминов [Ingush-Russian dictionary of terms] (in Ingush and Russian) (2nd ed.). Нальчик: ООО «Тетраграф». pp. 1–288.
- Кодзоев, Н. Д. (2021). Хайрова, Р. Р. (ed.). Русско-ингушский словарь [Russian-Ingush dictionary] (in Ingush and Russian). Ростов-на-Дону. pp. 1–656. ISBN 978-5-906785-55-8.
- Зязиков, М. М. (2004). Традиционная культура ингушей: история и современность [Traditional culture of the Ingush: history and modernity] (in Russian). Ростов-на-Дону: СКНЦ ВШ. pp. 1–312. ISBN 5-87872-302-6.
