= Abrek =

Lone North Caucasian partisan

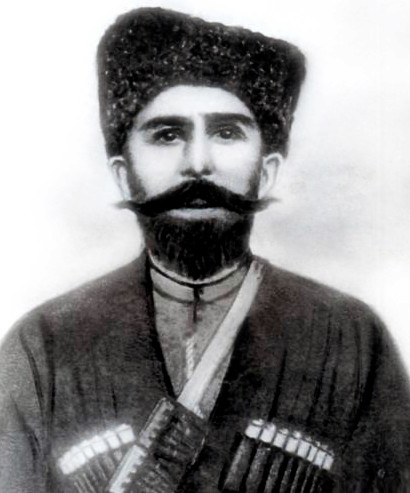
Zelimkhan (1872-1913), the most famous Chechen abrek

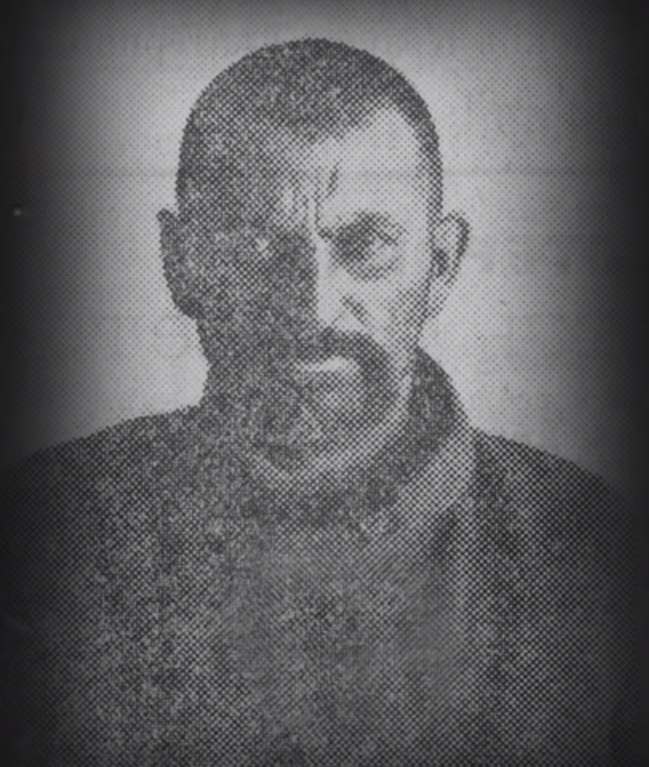
Sulumbek of Sagopshi (1878-1911), one of the most famous Caucasian abreks.

The word "abrek" (Note: Adyghe: Абрэдж, romanized: Abredzh; Chechen: Обарг, romanized: Obarg; Lezgian: ГъабрекI, romanized: Abrek; Ingush: Эба́рг, romanized: Ebarg; Iron Ossetic: Абырæг, romanized: Abyräg; Russian: Абрек), a term of Caucasian origin, designates a lone Caucasian warrior living in partisan style outside power and law and fighting for a just cause. An abrek would renounce any contact with friends and relatives, and then dedicate his life to praying and to fighting for justice.

Before and even after the establishment of Soviet power in the North Caucasus in the 1920s, abreks continued to resist, for the most part in Ingushetia, Chechnya and Dagestan, many of them also in Georgia after the Soviet conquest of that country in 1921. During the deportation of the Chechens and Ingush in 1944 several local guerilla groups formed to fight against Stalinist repression. The most prominent abrek during this period was the Ingush guerilla fighter Akhmed Khuchbarov (1894-1956). The last anti-Soviet Chechen abrek, Khasukha Magomadov (born in 1905or in May 1907), was killed on 28 March 1976 at about the age of 70.

== Etymology ==
The etymology of the word "abrek" currently remains unclear, despite numerous theories. According to one version, the word may originate from the Lezgin language, specifically from two words — "ab" (Lezgian: гъаб) and "rek" (Lezgian: рикI), which can be translated as "brave man" or "brave heart". As a borrowing into Russian, it can have derogatory connotations of banditry. The word first appeared in Russian in 1743, borrowed by the Cossacks from Kabardian, before it entered the literary language through South Russian dialects, first appearing in fiction in the 1830s.

== History ==
A person who became an abrek was usually a Caucasian, having taken a vow of revenge due to grief, shame or resentment. The newly appeared abrek abandoned his native society and wandered on his own without any companions. From that moment on, there were no more laws for him, and even his own life was not valuable to him, he dedicated his entire existence to fighting for a specific purpose. Therefore, coming across an abrek was considered dangerous. In addition, abreks almost never surrendered, preferring to fight to the death or instead commit suicide if there were no other options left. The primary targets of abreks usually were Cossacks who occupied their lowlands, Russian trade, banking, and mail services, because of the proximity of the Georgian Military Road, a major artery connecting Russia and Georgia.

Russian caucasologist N. Yakovlev, described how the occupation of the native lands by Cossack colonisers and oppression of the Ingush, "turned kind and gentle people into the first abreks of the Caucasus, fighting for their place in the Sun". The Russian view on the abreks is that they were simply mountain bandits and outlaws; however, they were depicted as men of honor by some Russian authors. The locals view is that they were heroes of valor, much like Robin Hood. As Moshe Gammer points out in his book Lone Wolf and Bear, Soviet ideology fell somewhere in between the two views―and notably, one such abrek, Zelimkhan, was made a Chechen hero.

== Notable abreks ==
Name	Origin	Years	Location of activity
Jambulat Tsechoev	Orstkhoy	?–1825	Yandare, Nazran
Abdullah Kirivi	Lezgin	1890–1913	Derbent, Makhachkala, Baku
Zelimkhan Kharachoevsky	Chechen	1901–1913	Grozny, Kizlyar
Ali Hilivi	Lezgin	1837–1839	Qusar, Derbent
Sulumbek Sagopshinsky	Ingush	1909–1911	Karabulak
Taymas Gubdenskiy	Dargin	1817–1859	Gubden, Gunib
Haddam Chakarvi	Lezgin	1871–1922	Qusar
Khasukha Magomadov	Chechen	1907–1976	Chechnya
Mahmud Shtulvi	Lezgin	1875–192?	Derbent, Qusar
Akhmed Khuchbarov	Ingush	1894–1956	Galashkinsky District
Laysat Baysarova	Ingush	1944–1957	

== Bibliography ==
- Yakovlev, Nikolai (1925). Ингуши [The Ingush] (in Russian). Moscow: Типография Госиздата „Красный Пролетарий“. pp. 3–134.
