= Zelimkhan =

Chechen abrek

Zelimkhan Gushmazukayev Харачойн Зеламха
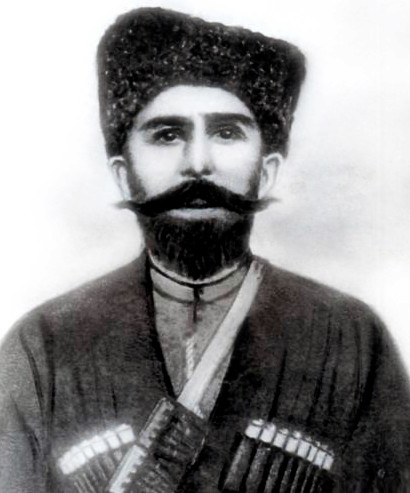
- Born: January 1872; Kharachoy, Terek Oblast, Russian Empire
- Died: 26 September 1913 (aged 41); Shali, Terek Oblast, Russian Empire
- Other name: "Chechen Robin Hood"
- Occupation: Abrek
- Years active: 1905—1913
- Known for: Raids on banks

Zelimkhan "Kharachoevsky" Gushmazukayev (Chechen: Харачойн Зеламха, romanized: Kharachoyn Zelamkha; January 1872 – 26 September 1913) and better known simply as Zelimkhan, was a Chechen outlaw (abrek) who gained fame in the late Russian Empire due to his spectacular bank and train robberies as part of a violent struggle with the Russian authorities. Since the Russian Revolution he has been mythologized as a version of a Chechen Robin Hood, first by the Bolsheviks (for fighting against the Tsarist regime) and later by Chechen nationalists. Today the name Zelimkhan is given to Chechen and Ingush children.

Together with Zelimkhan was his colleague and comrade, the Ingush abrek Sulumbek of Sagopshi, who participated in the most high-profile events associated with Zelimkhan.

During the early 20th century, after the events of 1905, Zelimkhan was a particular problem for the Russian governors of the restive region, and enjoyed the support of the local Chechen population. He would ultimately become a symbol of triumph over the Russian administration, committing brazen feats such as the robbery of the Kizlyar treasury, carried out in broad daylight on March 27, 1910 and distributing the money to poor people; he became varyingly seen as a fighter for "justice" or as one who continued the fight of the Muslim population for independence from Russia, being compared to Imam Shamil. In September 1913, Zelimkhan was killed in a short battle with tsarist forces near the village of Shali.

There was a statue of Zelimkhan outside the site of the village of Serzhen'-Yurt, which was destroyed during the First Chechen War.

== Folk songs about Zelimkhan ==
There is a popular folk song about Zelimkhan.

Excerpt from a Khevsurian folk song about Zelimkhan:

He howls because there is no death for him. He would like to die of longing for the family, which the Russian authorities sent, not sparing little children, to the ends of the earth, where people gather only after death. But death does not take Zelim-Khan, since God protects him until the moment when he avenges every one of his dead relatives to all the guilty, since God does not leave any evil, not a single tear inflicted on the innocent without avenge. And since he, Zelim-Khan, is a real man, only then will he find peace and death for himself when he covers blood with blood. Until the will of God is done, death itself is afraid of Zelim-Khan, and does not touch him until that moment. He seeks death, but he carries it over his shoulders, in the muzzle of his rifle. Oh, poor Zelim-Khan.

— Khevsur folk song, Notes of the Terek Society of Lovers of Cossack Antiquity

== Bibliography ==
- Гриценко, Н. П. (1971). Классовая борьба крестьян в чечено-ингушетии на рубеже XIX-XX веков [The class struggle of peasants in Chechen-Ingushetia at the turn of the 19th-20th centuries] (in Russian). Грозный: Чечено-Ингушское книжное издательство. pp. 1–109.
- Rebecca Ruth Gould, "Transgressive Sanctity: The Abrek in Chechen Culture," Kritika: Explorations in Russian and Eurasian History 8.2 (2007): 271–306.
