= Sagopshi =

Rural locality in Ingushetia

Sagopshi Сагопши
- Selo

Other transcription(s)
  - Ingush: Соагӏапче
- Interactive map of Sagopshi
- Location of Sagopshi Sagopshi (Republic of Ingushetia)
- Coordinates: 43°29′05″N 44°35′17″E
- Country: Russia
- Federal subject: Ingushetia
- Founded: 1863
- Elevation: 397 m (1,302 ft)

Population (2010 Census)
  - Total: 10 048
  - Estimate (2021): 12,663

Administrative status
  - Subordinated to: Malgobeksky District
- Time zone: UTC+3 (MSK)
- Postal code: 386340
- OKTMO ID: 26615405101

Sagopshi (Ingush: Соагӏапче, romanized: Soaghapče; Russian: Сагопши) is a rural locality (a selo) in Malgobeksky District of the Republic of Ingushetia, Russia. Population: 10,048 (2010 census); 10,738 (2002 census).

== History ==
=== Formation of the village (1863 - 1874) ===
In 1863, two new settlements appeared in the mountainous area of Malaya Kabarda, on the river Psygobzhe. The first settlement was called Tsokalo Bokova (Upper Sagopsh) and was inhabited mainly by settlers from Eldarkhan-kala. The second settlement was called Alamkacha Gatagazhev (Lower Sagopsh) and was populated by settlers from the Tarskaya Valley (Abrekovo village).

In 1865, the settlement of Tsokalo Bokov was abandoned due to the migration of its inhabitants to Turkey, and was soon re-populated by the Orstkhoys who remained in their homeland. They gave the settlement a new name, New Akh-Barza.

In 1874, as a result of forced eviction to the plain and the unification of two settlements, the modern village of Sagopshi was formed.

=== Period of deportation and renaming (1944 - 1957) ===
During the period of the deportation of Chechens and Ingush and the abolition of the Chechen-Ingush Autonomous Soviet Socialist Republic (ASSR), the village was called Nogzard and was part of the North Ossetian Autonomous Soviet Socialist Republic.

=== Return to the original name (1958 - present) ===
In 1958, the settlement was returned to its former name, Sagopshi.

== Geography ==
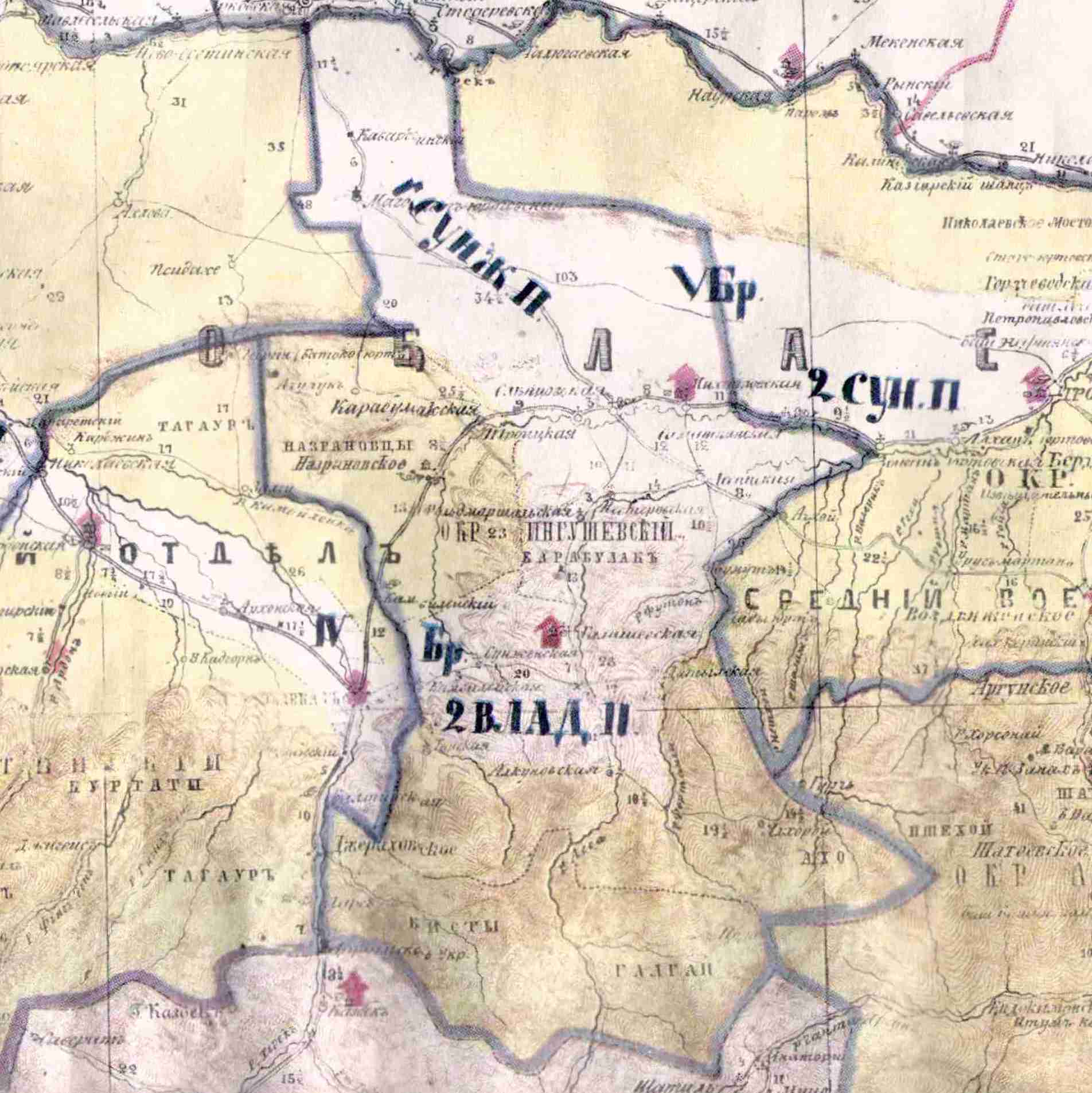
The village of Sagopshi on the map of the Ingush district in 1853.

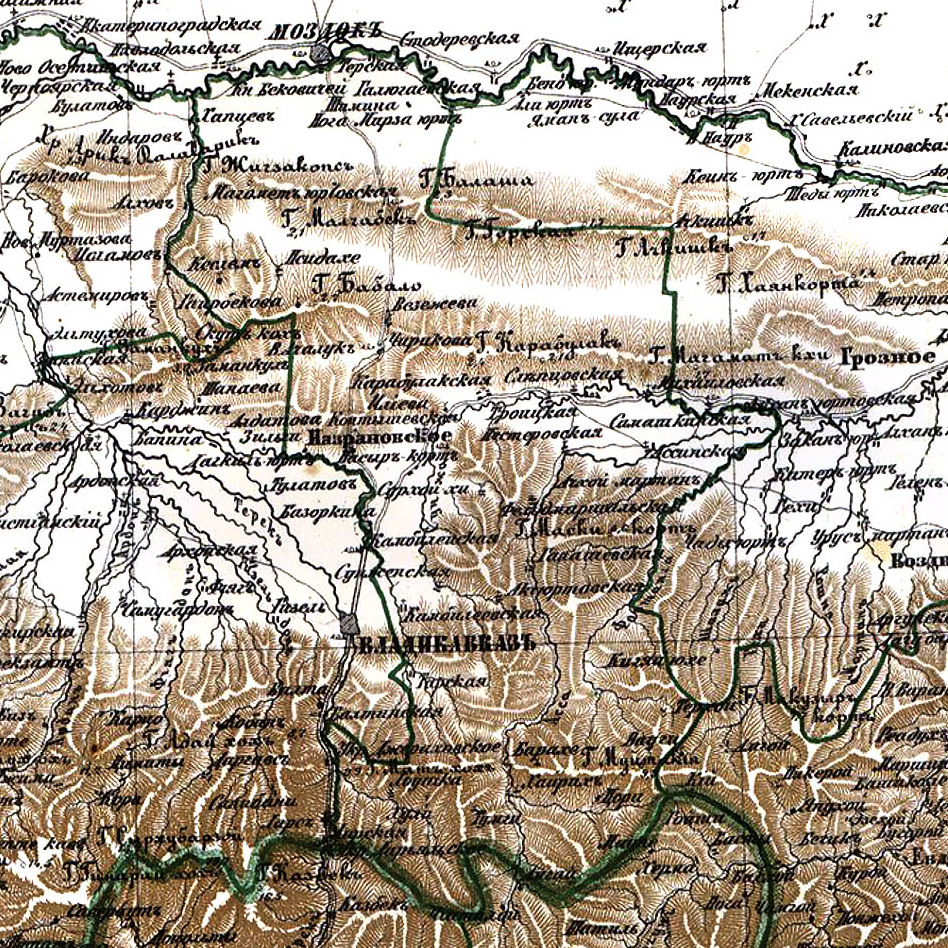
The village of Sagopshi on the map of the Ingush district in 1869.

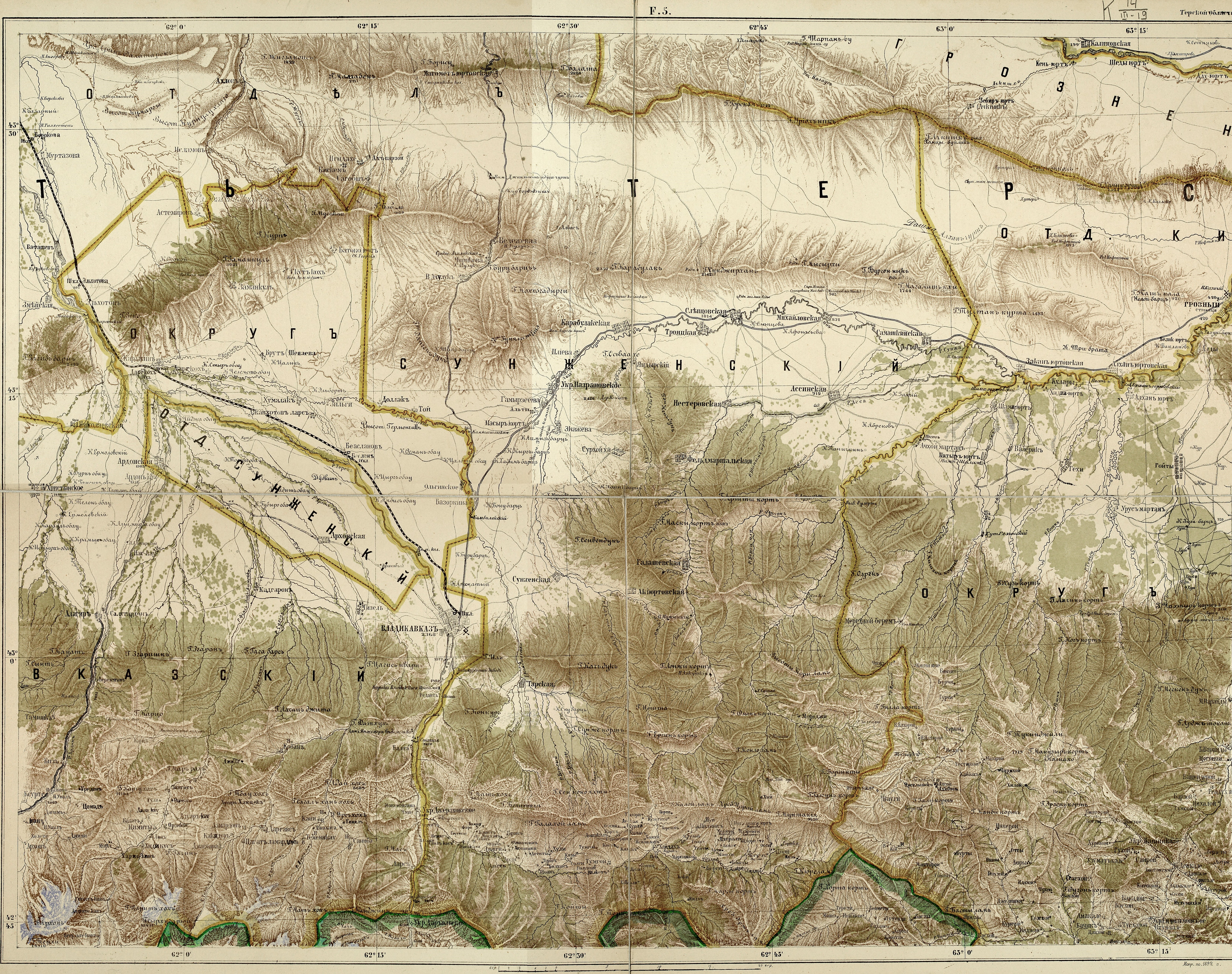
The village Sagopshi on the map of Sunzhensky (Ingush) otdel in 1892

The village of Novy Redant is situated in the Alkhanchurt Valley, on the northern slope of the Sunzha Range. It is located 16 km southeast of the district center of the city of Malgobek and 48 km northwest of the city of Magas.

The nearest settlements to Novy Redant include the city of Malgobek to the north, the village of Yuzhnoye to the northeast, the village of Zyazikov-Yurt to the east, the village of Nizhniye Achaluki to the southeast, and the villages of Psedakh and Inarki to the southwest.

== Demographics ==
Historical population
Year	Pop.	±%
1901	101,102	—
1926	2,381	−97.6%
2002	10,738	+351.0%
2006	11,221	+4.5%
2007	11,336	+1.0%
2008	11,461	+1.1%
1956	11,646	+1.6%
2010	10,048	−13.7%
2011	10,076	+0.3%
2012	10,360	+2.8%
2013	10,604	+2.4%
2014	10,950	+3.3%
2015	11,247	+2.7%
2016	11,487	+2.1%
2017	11,675	+1.6%
2018	11,918	+2.1%
2019	12,158	+2.0%
2020	12,442	+2.3%
2021	12,663	+1.8%

=== Ethnic composition ===
Ethnicity	Number of people	share
Inguish	9,940	99.93%
other	108	1.07%

=== others ===
- Bokovy
- Bulguchevy
- Belkharoevy (Belkhoroy)
- Velkhievy
- Galaevy
- Gandaloevy
- Gushlakievy
- Khashi evy
- Korigovy
- Mamievy
- Merzhoevy
- Muzhakhoevy
- Sosurkievy
- Fargievy
- Tsechoevy
- Tsokiyevy
- Elkharoevy

== Notable people ==
- Sulumbek of Sagopshi — Ingush abrek

== Bibliography ==
- Оздоев, И. А. (1980). Оздоева, Ф. Г.; Куркиев, А. С. (eds.). Русско-ингушский словарь: 40 000 слов [Russian-Ingush dictionary: 40,000 words] (in Ingush and Russian). Москва: Русский язык. pp. 1–832.
