= Yandare =

Rural locality in Ingushetia

Yandare Яндаре
- Selo

Other transcription(s)
  - Ingush: Яндаре (Note: • Commonly mentioned as 'Yandare' (Ingush: Яндаре), however the village was sometimes mentioned as 'Yandare' (Ingush: Йандаре).)
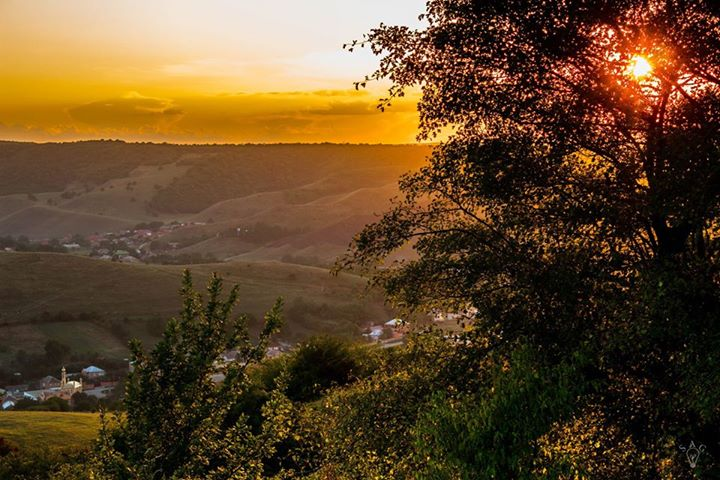
- Interactive map of Yandare
- Location of Yandare Yandare (Republic of Ingushetia)
- Coordinates: 43°16′09″N 44°54′31″E
- Country: Russia
- Federal subject: Ingushetia
- Founded: 1772

Population (2010 Census)
  - Total: 7,980
  - Estimate (2021): 9,999 (+25.3%)

Administrative status
  - Subordinated to: Nazranovsky District
- Time zone: UTC+3 (MSK)
- Postal code: 386243
- OKTMO ID: 26605450101

Yandare (Ingush: Яндаре, romanized: Yandare) is a rural locality (a selo) in Nazranovsky District of the Republic of Ingushetia, Russia. It forms the municipality of the rural settlement of Yandare as the only settlement in its composition.

== Geography ==
The village is located on both banks of the Yandyrka River, just above its confluence with Sunzha, 7.5 km northeast of the regional center — the city of Nazran and 15 km northeast of the city of Magas.

The nearest settlements: in the north — the city of Karabulak, in the northeast — the stanitsa of Troitskaya, in the southeast - the stanitsa of Nesterovskaya, in the south - the village of Surkhakhi, in the southwest - the village of Ekazhevo and in the west - the villages of Gazi-Yurt and Plievo.

== History ==
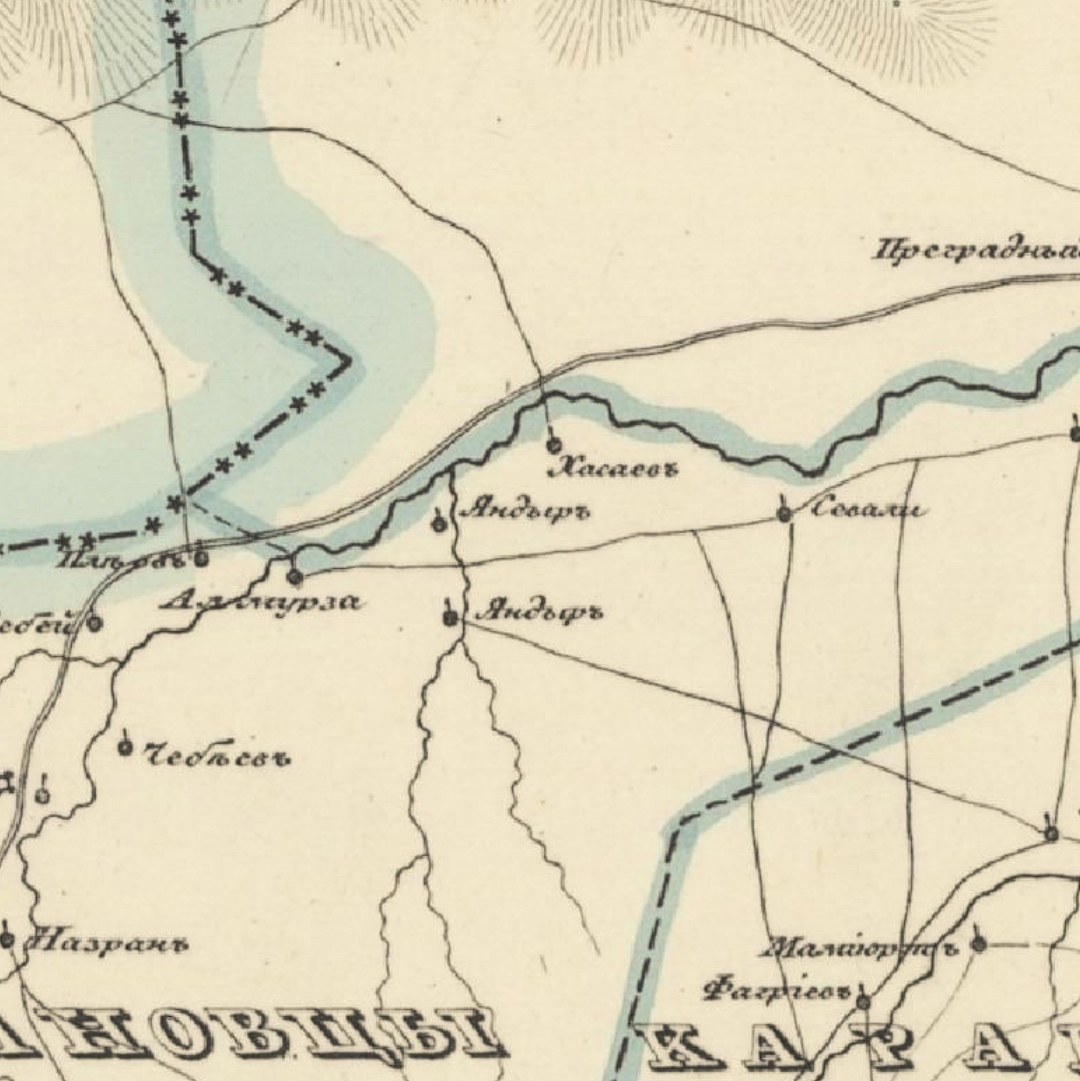
Fragment of Map of Friedrich von Schubert (1826-1840s) showing the villages of Big and Little Yandyr

The territory of Yandare, together with the villages of Gazi-Yurt, Surkhakhi, Ekazhevo, Ali-Yurt and the modern city of Magas, forms one of the largest archaeological complexes of the ancient settlements of the Alanian period, where, according to Ingush researchers, the historical city of Magas, the capital of the medieval state of Alania, was located, which included the territory of modern Ingushetia.

In 1833, an uprising broke out in Yandare, led by Dzhankhot Azamatov. In July of the same year, it was suppressed by troops. The houses of Dzhankhot Azamatov and his relatives were burned down. The destruction of the entire village was stopped due to the intercession of the Nazranian Ingush.

In the period from 1944 to 1958, after the deportation of Chechens and Ingush and the abolition of the Chechen-Ingush ASSR, the village was called Raydzast. After the rehabilitation and return of the Ingush people to Ingushetia, the village was returned to its historical name — Yandare.

== Infrastructure ==
The village has one central and 4 jamaat mosques, 3 secondary schools, madrasa, a House of Culture, as well as a village library and an outpatient clinic. Not far from the mosque there is a stele dedicated to the participants of the Great Patriotic War of 1941-1945.

== Bibliography ==
- Uzhakhov, M. G. (1927). Ингушско-русский словарик [Ingush-Russian Dictionary] (in Ingush and Russian). Vladikavkaz: Kraynatsizdat. pp. 1–185.
- Волкова, Н. Г. (1974). Этнический состав населения Северного Кавказа в XVIII — начале XX века [Ethnic composition of the population of the North Caucasus in the 18th - early 20th centuries] (in Russian). Москва: Наука. pp. 1–276.
- Оzdoyev, I. A. (1980). Оzdoyevа, F. G.; Kurkiyev, А. S. (eds.). Русско-ингушский словарь: 40 000 слов [Russian-Ingush Dictionary: 40,000 words] (in Ingush and Russian). Мoscow: Russian language. pp. 1–832.
- Барахоева, Н. М.; Кодзоев, Н. Д.; Хайров, Б. А. (2016). Ингушско-русский словарь терминов [Ingush-Russian dictionary of terms] (in Ingush and Russian) (2 ed.). Нальчик: ООО «Тетраграф». pp. 1–288.
- Кодзоев, Н. Д. (2021). Хайрова, Р. Р. (ed.). Русско-ингушский словарь [Russian-Ingush dictionary] (in Ingush and Russian). Ростов-на-Дону: Типография «Лаки Пак». pp. 1–656. ISBN 978-5-906785-55-8.
- Мальсагов, З. К. (1963). Оздоева, Ф. (ed.). Грамматика ингушского языка [Grammar of the Ingush language] (in Ingush and Russian). Vol. 5 (2nd ed.). Грозный: Чечено-Ингушское Книжное Издательство. pp. 1–164.
- Долгиева, М. Б.; Картоев, М. М.; Кодзоев, Н. Д.; Мамиев, Т. Х. (2013). История Ингушетии (in Russian) (4 ed.). Ростов-на-Дону: Южный издательский дом. pp. 1–600. ISBN 978-5-98864-056-1.
- Шнирельман, В. А. (2006). Калинин, И. (ed.). Быть Аланами: Интеллектуалы и политика на Северном Кавказе в XX веке [To be Alans: Intellectuals and Politics in the North Caucasus in the 20th Century] (in Russian). Москва: Новое Литературное Обозрение. pp. 1–348. ISBN 5-86793-406-3. ISSN 1813-6583.
