= List of Ingush people =

This is a partial list of notable Ingush people.

== Politics and military ==
- Sultan-Murza - prince of village Lars
- Muhammed from Ingushetia - mufti of Ichkeria and naib of Aukh
- Utsig Malsag - commander of the Russian Empire
- Yaponts Abadiyev – commander of several Red Army cavalry regiments during World War II
- Rashid-bek Akhriev – first North Caucasian pilot
- Bashir Aushev – Deputy Prime Minister of Ingushetia from 2002 to 2008
- Maksharip Aushev – opposition leader
- Ruslan Aushev – lieutenant-general in the Red Army, Hero of the Soviet Union, negotiator during the Beslan school hostage crisis, and first President of Ingushetia
- Sulumbek of Sagopshi – Ingush abrek
- Mandre Nalgiev - Ingush sniper and avenger
- Akhmed Khuchbarov – Ingush abrek
- Laysat Baysarova – Komsomol-educated Voroshilov shooter turned abrek
- Khizir Khadziev – Ingush abrek
- Issa Kostoyev – prosecutor
- Shirvani Kostoyev – Il-2 pilot during World War II; Hero of the Russian Federation
- Ahmed Malsagov – Pe-2 pilot during World War II; Hero of the Russian Federation
- Sulom-Bek Oskanov – Major General of the Air Force, Hero of the Russian Federation
- Murad Ozdoev – World War II fighter pilot, concentration camp survivor; Hero of the Russian Federation
- Asiyat Tutaeva – Army medic during World War II
- Yunus-bek Yevkurov – Major-general, Hero of the Russian Federation, third president of Ingushetia
- Magomed Yevloyev – journalist and critic of Murat Zyazikov
- Murat Zyazikov – Second president of Ingushetia
- Ali Taziev – Ingush warlord, Commander of the Caucasian Front
- Ruslan Khuchbarov – Ingush warlord
- Magomed Khashiev – Ingush warlord
- Хаутиев Руслан Султанович-родился 1978 г.-2013-2016 министр Миннаца Ингушетии, 2016 г.- Постоянный Представитель Республики Ингушетия при Президенте РФ.

== Athletes ==
- Israil Arsamakov – weightlifter and olympic champion
- Rakhim Chakhkiev – boxer
- Bekkhan Ozdoev – wrestler
- Islam Timurziev – boxer
- Magomed Ozdoyev - Central Midfielder for PAOK FC in the Super League Greece
- Musa Evloev, Greco-Roman wrestler, two-time world champion and two-time national champion
- Zelimkhan Bakayev, right winger for FC Spartak Moscow.
- Movsar Evloev, Mixed martial artist.
- Dzhafar Kostoev, Judoka.

== Scientists ==
=== Historians ===
- Maksharip Muzhukhoev, historian and archeologist (dr. of historical sciences).
- Nureddin Akhriev, arabist, orientalist.

=== Linguists ===
- Alimbek Kurkiev, linguist and philologist (dr. of philological sciences).
- Firuza Ozdoeva, linguist and philologist (dr. of philological sciences).

== Business ==
- Mikhail Gutseriyev – one of Russia's richest people with an estimated net worth of US$6.4 billion
- Said Gutsiriev – son of Mikhail Gutseriyev and CEO of ForteInvest
- Musa Keligov – former vice president of Lukoil
- Mikail Shishkhanov – banker and financier

== Artists ==
- Ruslan Mamilow – sculptor
