= Asiyat Tutaeva =

Soviet combat medic

Asiyat Idrisovna Tutaeva
- Native name: Тутайнаькъан Идриса Асият
- Born: 1902 or 1905; Nazran, Ingushetia, Russian Empire
- Died: 29 October 1944 Kolodno, Ternopil Oblast, Ukrainian SSR
- Allegiance: Soviet Union
- Branch: Red Army; Medical Corps
- Rank: Major

Asiyat Idrisovna Tutaeva (Note: Russian: Асият Идрисовна Тутаева, Ingush: Тутайнаькъан Идриса Асият, romanized: Tutaynäqhan Idrisa Asiyat) ( c. 1902 or 1905 – 29 October 1944) was an Ingush medic with the rank of Major in the Red Army.

== Biography ==
Asiyat Tutaeva was born in 1902 or 1905 in Nazran, Ingushetia and received secondary education in Vladikavkaz. In 1924, Tutaeva enrolled at the North Caucasus University in Rostov-on-Don to study medicine. She graduated in 1929 and began practicing medicine in nearby Bazorkino (now Chermin). At this time, Asiyat and her sister Nina were two of only four Ingush women with higher education. Asiyat transferred to Leningrad in 1932 and, four years later, became a specialist in the treatment of infectious disease and the first medical scientist from Chechnya-Ingushetia.

On 23 June 1941, Tutaeva was drafted into the Red Army as a military physician and stationed to the Voronezh and 1st Ukrainian Fronts, near Leningrad.

In 1944, as Tutaeva's hospital was redeploying to Ukraine, it was captured by German soldiers. All of its staff were tortured and then executed by gunshot on 29 October in Ternopil Oblast, at the village Kolodno, Zbarazh Raion.

== See also ==
- Zoya Kosmodemyanskaya
