= Isting =

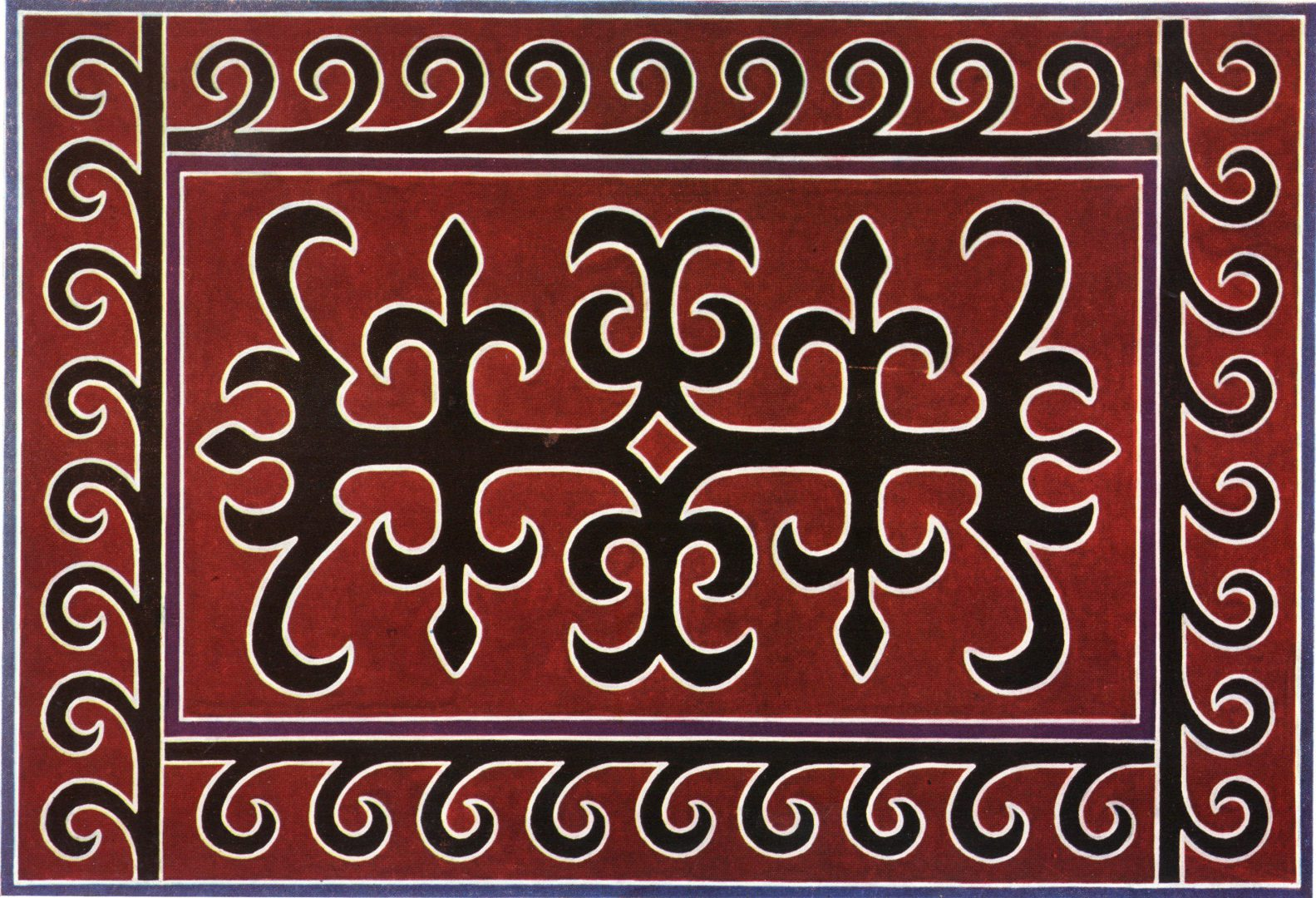
- Type: Textile art
- Material: Felt (wool)
- Place of origin: Ingushetia

Isting (Ingush: Истинг) is a traditional Ingush craft of producing felt items, including solid felt carpets decorated with sewn ornamental designs, as well as related objects such as wall hangings, floor coverings, and prayer carpets.

Within the Ingush tradition of felt carpet production, two additional categories are identified: ferta, referring to plain, uniformly dyed felt lacking decorative elements, and khetta ferta, a composite felt textile constructed from multiple segments arranged into a coherent ornamental composition, subsequently stitched into a unified surface and accented with white braided trimming along ornamental contours.

Comparable forms of felt carpet manufacture are documented across other regions of the North Caucasus. The production of istings was historically an exclusively female activity. This gendered specialization is reflected in the term itself, derived from the Ingush word istiy (“women”).

A significant source for the study of Ingush ornamental systems is the early twentieth-century manuscript Ghalghaj gharchož , which preserves traditional knowledge of decorative motifs and compositional principles.

== History ==
The tradition of felting istings originates in the ancient ornamental culture of the Ingush people, noted for its symbolic character and archaic visual forms. Ingush ornamentation is distinguished by compact composition, conciseness, symmetrical structure, rhythmic balance, and dynamic linearity.

In the early 20th century, archaeological and ethnographic expeditions in Ingushetia documented numerous handmade carpets. Kh. Akhriev was among the first researchers to record such artifacts in the 1920s, producing sketches from the Kistin Gorge and the plains of Ingushetia. Later documentation was carried out by I. Sheblykin, G.-M. Daurbekov, M. Bazorkin, and others. Soviet scholars including E. Krupnov and L. Semyonov further studied this craft tradition.

Some of these materials were preserved in the Chechen-Ingush Museum of Local History, although part of the archive was lost in the 1990s. In 1978, the catalogue Decorative and Applied Art of Checheno-Ingushetia was published, which included carpet ornament drawings by Kh. Akhriev, G.-M. Daurbekov, and other artists. In 2015, the book Isting was published in Turkey by author Erol Yeldır and compiler Salman Beshta (Akhriev). It includes drawings and photographs of istings brought to Turkey by Ingush and Chechen muhacirs in the 19th century. The book presents more than 90 types of carpets.

In some Ingush villages, istings were produced for both household use and trade. Major centers of production in the late 19th and early 20th centuries included Barsuki, Altievo, Gamurzievo, Plievo, and mountainous village Goust.

Today, old istings are preserved in museum collections such as the Ingush State Museum of Local History, the Memorial Complex to the Victims of Repression in Ingushetia, and the Museum of Fine Arts of the Republic of Ingushetia.

== Production technique ==
The production of felt carpets was a complex and time-consuming process. It began with the preparation of sheep wool, which was then felted into textile sheets. The material was subsequently dyed, sewn, and decorated using appliqué techniques. The edges were often finished with white piping, while ornamental motifs were applied along structured contours.

== Ornamentation and symbolic meaning ==
Isting carpets were not regarded solely as craft objects but also as carriers of symbolic and protective meanings. Ornamentation was understood to have semantic and apotropaic significance, with motifs functioning as talismans or protective signs.

Certain patterns were believed to represent blessings, protection from misfortune, or warnings against disease, war, drought, and other calamities. Complex geometric compositions, including labyrinth-like and asymmetrical forms, were intended to confuse or repel harmful forces. Such protective motifs were also used in domestic spaces, including as amulets placed above children's cradles.

Ornamental systems were highly conservative and preserved over generations, being reproduced across carpets, clothing, embroidery, and protective household objects.

== Cultural role ==
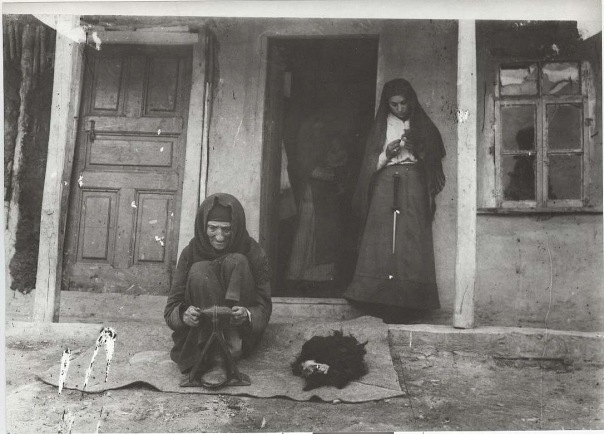
Women combing wool with a carding comb in mountainous Ingushetia, 1920s.

In traditional society, isting formed an essential part of female domestic craft. Prior to marriage, Ingush girls were expected to prepare felt carpets as part of their dowry, a process that could take between one and three years. Isting thus played a role not only in material culture but also in the social and familial structure of Ingush society.

Ornamental motifs were also applied to various aspects of material culture, including tower interiors, clothing, weapon handles, and household items.

== Impact of the 1944 deportation ==
The deportation of the Chechens and Ingush in 1944 had a profound impact on Ingush cultural heritage. According to various estimates, between 500,000 and 650,000 people were forcibly relocated to Kazakhstan and Kyrgyzstan, with a significant proportion perishing during deportation or in the following period.

The deportation led to the destruction of much of the material and cultural heritage of the region. Abandoned settlements were looted, libraries were destroyed, books in national languages were burned, and toponyms were changed. In 1957, the Checheno-Ingush Autonomous Soviet Socialist Republic was restored, and survivors were allowed to return; however, many settlements no longer existed, and some deported families remained in Central Asia.

During the deportation period, felt carpets were widely used for survival in harsh conditions. They were used for insulation in unheated homes, as bedding for children, and were often exchanged for basic food supplies. As a result, many original carpets were lost or destroyed, with only a small number preserved as family heirlooms. These surviving examples later became important sources for reconstructing traditional ornamentation.

== Preservation and research ==
As a consequence of these historical events, much of the traditional cultural heritage associated with Ingush felt-making was lost or fragmented. Surviving objects and ornamental fragments preserved in museums and private collections have become valuable sources for the study of pre-Islamic and traditional Ingush decorative systems.

Research into Ingush ornamentation remains in its early stages and requires continued scholarly attention. Each newly discovered object is of significant cultural value and contributes to the reconstruction of Ingush artistic heritage.

== Gallery ==
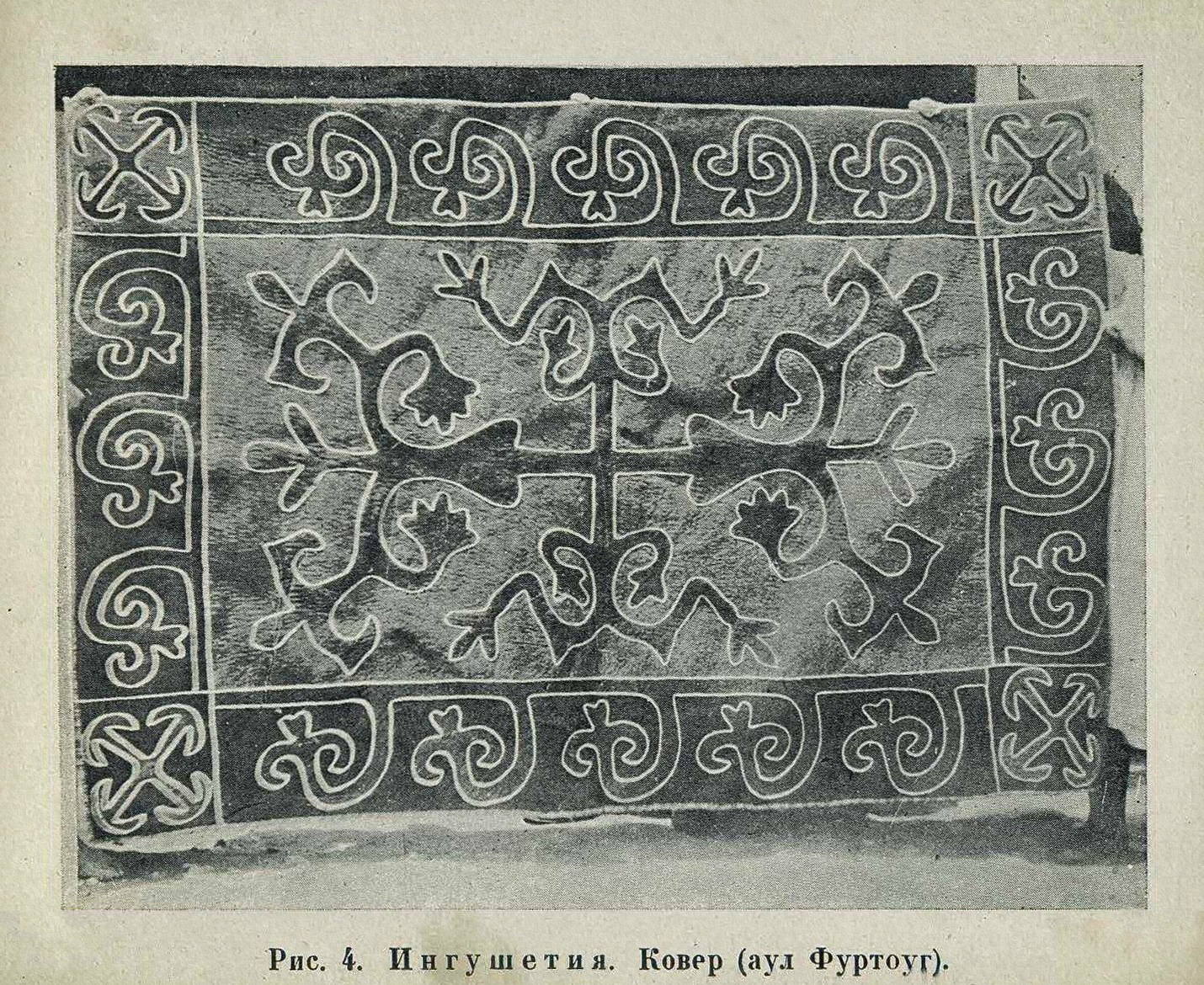

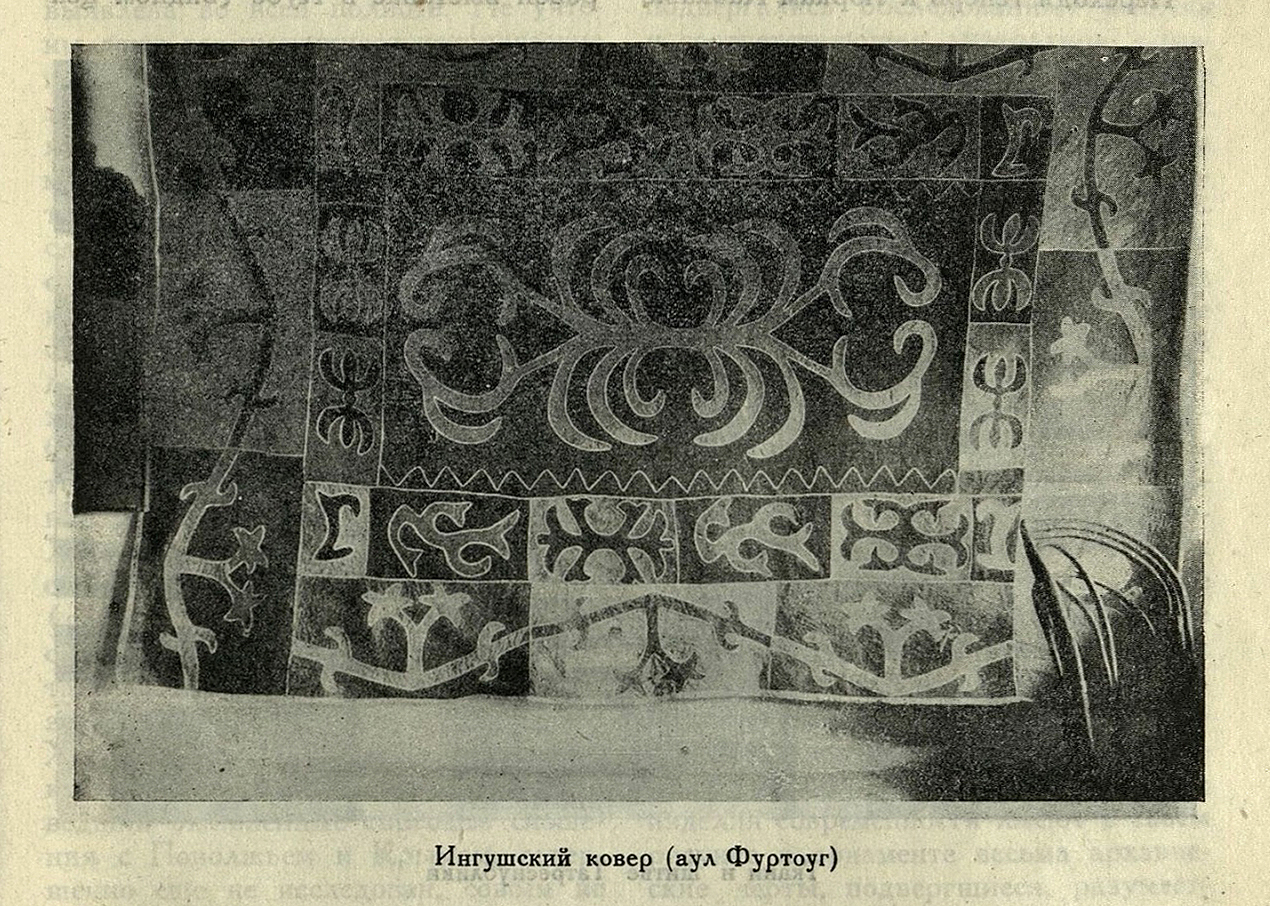

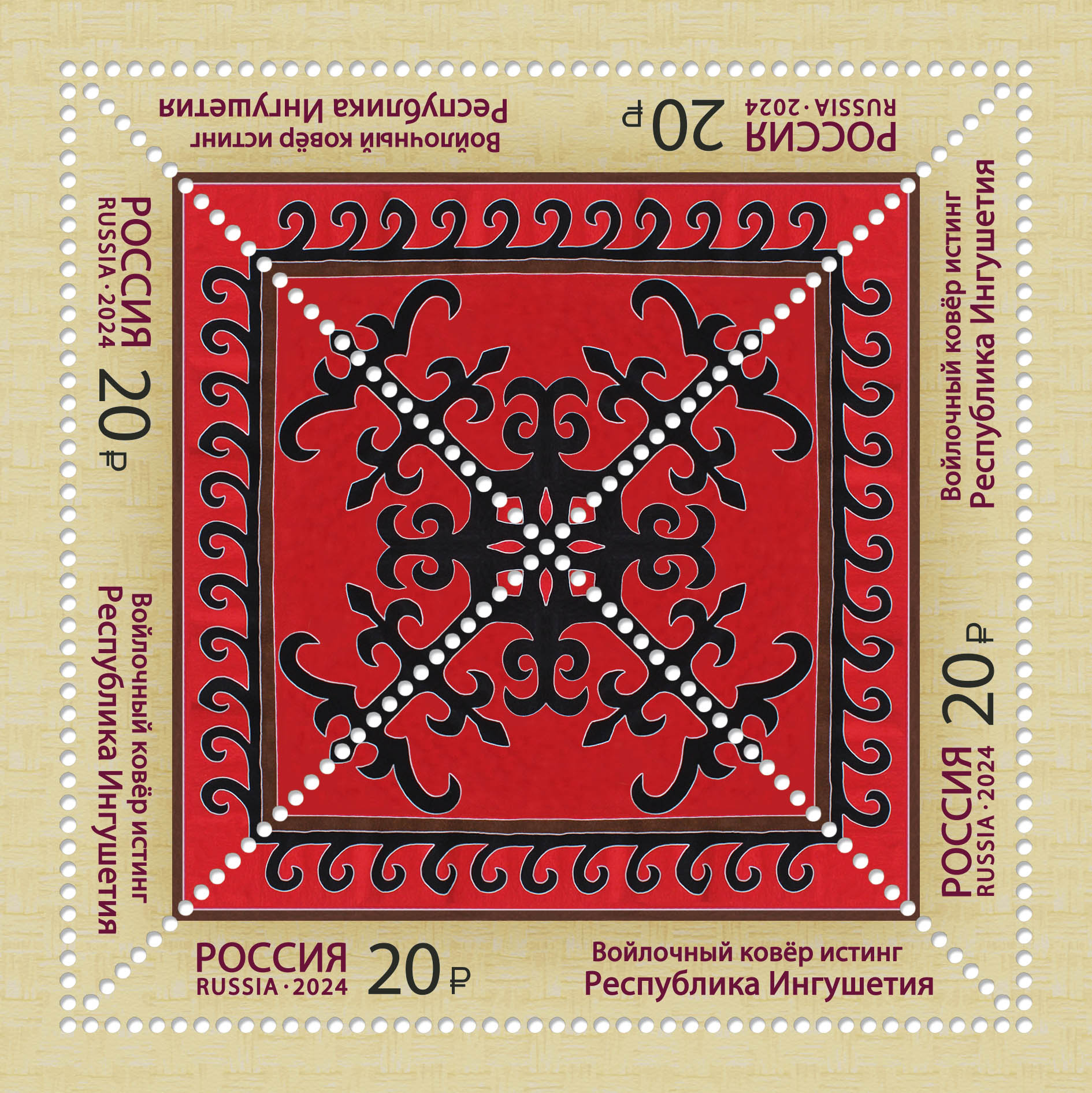
A Russian postage stamp block issued in 2024 depicting an Ingush felt carpet (isting).

== Literature ==
- Bulatova, S. (2022). "Isting". svetlanabulatova.com.
- Conant, E. (2022). "Memories are crafted in wool in this tiny Russian republic" (magazine). National Geographic.
- Ghalghaj gharchož (Ingush ornaments) (PDF) (in Ingush) (manuscript, illustrated album ed.). 1924.
- Dzarakhova, Z. (2017). T. Zherebilo (ed.). "Войлочное орнаментальное ковроделие у ингушей" [Felt ornamental carpet weaving among the Ingush]. Vestnik IngNII GU im. Ch. E. Akhrieva (in Russian) (1). Magas: ИнгНИИ: 119–125.
- Dzaurova, T. (2019). V. Mityukova, Kh. Nakostoev (ed.). ГӀалгӀай къаман гӀарчош [Ingush national ornament.] (in Russian). Moscow: Де’ Либри. p. 376. ISBN 978-5-4491-0314-7.
- Ivanovskaya, V. (2010). Ornaments of the peoples of the Caucasus (in Russian). Moscow: V. Shevchuk.
- Isaev, E. (2009). Religious-ethical foundations of traditional culture of the Vainakh. Doctoral dissertation (PhD in Philosophy: 09.00.13) (in Russian). Makhachkala: Dagestan State University. p. 347.
- Kudusova, F. (1991). I. Iriskhanov (ed.). Family and household life of the Ingush (in Russian). Grozny: Kniga. p. 80. ISBN 5-7666-0430-0.
- Markgraf, O. (1882). Sketch of handicrafts of the North Caucasus with description of production techniques (in Russian). Moscow: S. Lepyoshkin. p. 288.
- Sultygova, M. (2012). Agricultural vocabulary of the Ingush language. Doctoral dissertation (Philology: 10.02.02) (in Russian). Makhachkala. p. 340.
- Shavlaeva, T. (2009). From the history of wool handicraft development among the Chechens in the 19th – early 20th century (in Russian). Nalchik: State enterprise “Republican Printing Complex named after the Revolution of 1905”. p. 204. ISBN 978-5-88195-989-0.
- Sheblykin, I. (1928). O. Akhriev (ed.). The art of the Ingush in monuments of material culture (in Russian). Vladikavkaz: ИНИИК.
