= Utsig Malsag =

Ingush Russian Empire commander

- Born: 1825
- Died: 1857 (aged 31–32)
- Buried: Vladikavkaz
- Allegiance: Russian Empire
- Rank: Shtabs-rotmistr

Malsag Utsigovich Dolgiev (Note: Russian: Малсаг Уцигович Долгиев; Ingush: Уцига Малсаг, romanized: Utsiga Malsag; • Referred in Chechen folklore as Malsag, the Nazranian.) (1825 – 1857) was an Ingush commander of the Russian Empire, namely the Stabs-Rittmeister. Malsag served in the His Majesty's Own Cossack Escort, a Russian Imperial Guard formation within the Imperial Russian Army. Belonging to the Ingush clan (teip) Tumkhoy, he is considered as a hero in the many Ingush and Chechen legends dedicated to him.

== Military rank ==
Ranked as Stabs-Rittmeister, Dolgiev served in the His Majesty's Own Cossack Escort, a Russian Imperial Guard formation within the Imperial Russian Army.

== Death ==
On 11 March 1857, Utsig was going through Urus-Martan together with Edi Malsagov, 4 military personnel and 10 civilians, when not far away from Vozdvizhenskoye Fortress, they were ambushed by an "enemy" group of 150 men, who ultimately killed Dolgiev. Military commander of the Urus-Martan Fortress later revealed that the enemy group was originally planning on to attack Urus-Martan civilians, however Dolgiev caught their attention which led to the incident.

According to a legend, Utsig Malsag and his three companions were ambushed by a naib of Imam Shamil, the Chechen Saadula Ospanov. After hearing that Utsig Malsag was going to Chechnya, Shamil gave Saadula the mission to find Utsig Malsag and bring him either captured or his severed head. Saadula succeeded in fatally wounding Utsig Malsag in a duel but refused to decapitate the latter due to his death wish, that his body shall not be disfigured. Having triumphantly ambushed and defeated Dolgiev, Saadula took his shoulder straps as proof of victory and returned to Imam Shamil, who reacted angered of Saadula for not fulfilling his order of either bringing him alive or his head. The two got into a dispute which ended with Saadula leaving the ranks of Imam Shamil.

== Bibliography ==
- Aushev, M. (1995-12-21). "Уцига Малсаг" [Utsiga Malsag]. Ingushetia (in Russian).
- Картоев, М. М. (2014). Ингушетия в политике Российской империи на Кавказе. XIX век. Сборник документов и материалов [Ingushetia in the policy of the Russian Empire in the Caucasus. 19th century. Collection of documents and materials]. История Ингушетии: открытый архив (in Russian) (1st ed.). Ростов-на-Дону: Южный издательский дом. pp. 1–604. ISBN 978-5-98864-060-8.
- Магомаевъ, И. (1897). "Чеченскіе тексты" [Chechen texts]. Сборникъ матеріалов для описанія мѣстностей и племенъ Кавказа (in Russian). 22. Translated by Усларъ, П. К. Тифлисъ: Тип. Канц. Главноначальствуюшаго гражданскою частію на Кавказѣ, К. Козловскаго и А. Федорова: Отд. 3–й 1–12.
