= Laysat Baysarova =

Ingush abrek sniper

Laysat Tangieva
- Native name: Лайсат Тангиева
- Nickname: Elusive Panthera
- Born: 1920; Galashki
- Died: 2005 (aged 84–85)

Laysat Tangieva (Russian: Лайсат Тангиева, Ingush: ТӀонганаькъан Лайсат; 1920 – 2005) was an Ingush communist party worker turned abrek who became a sniper against the NKVD after being asked to assist in the deportation and exile of her people.

While hiding in the Caucasus Mountains from 1944 to 1957, the period of her nation's exile, she targeted and killed multiple Chekists in revenge for their attack on Vainakh people, having been previously trained in sharpshooting with the Komsomol before the decree declaring Ingush people official enemies of the state. In addition to her abrek activities she was the first woman to summit Mt. Elbrus, doing so with her husband Akhmedkhan in 1939. Upon the end of her exile period, she ceased her abrek activities and crossed into the Georgian SSR via the mountains, where she lived until returning to her native Ingushetia when she was elderly.
