= Ingush people =

Ethnic group native to the northeastern Caucasus

Ingush ГIалгIай Ghalghai
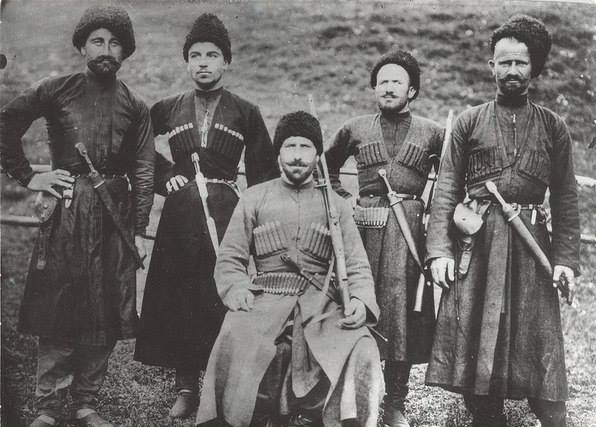
- Ingush highlanders, early 20th century

Total population
- c. 700,000

Regions with significant populations
- Russia: 517,186 (2021)
- Ingushetia: 473,440 (2021)
- Chechnya: 1,100 (2021)
- North Ossetia-Alania: 24,285 (2021)
- Turkey: 85,000 (2019)
- Kazakhstan: 18,000 (2016)

Languages
- Ingush

Religion
- Sunni Islam (Shafi'i Madhhab)

Related ethnic groups
- Other Nakh peoples (Chechens, Bats)

Ingush (Note: Also spelled Ingushes (/ˈɪnɡʊʃ/, /ɪnˈɡʊʃ/,/ɪŋˈɡʊʃ/, /-ɛz/, een-GOOSH), or Ingushetians.) (Ingush: Гӏалгӏай, romanized: Ghalghai, pronounced [ˈʁəlʁɑj]), historically known as Durdzuks, Gligvi and Kists, are a Northeast Caucasian ethnic group mainly inhabiting the Republic of Ingushetia in central Caucasus, but also inhabitanting Prigorodny District and town of Vladikavkaz of modern-day North-Ossetia. The Ingush are predominantly Sunni Muslims and speak the Ingush language.

== Ethnonym ==
=== Ingush ===
The ethnonym of the "Ingush" came from the name of the medieval Ghalghai village (aul) of Angusht, which by the end of the 17th century was a large village in the Tarskoye Valley. The toponym "Angusht" itself is a composition of three words: "an" (sky or horizon), "gush" (visible) and the suffix of place "tĕ" (indication of position or location), literally translating as a "place where the horizon is seen".

=== Ghalghai ===
The endonym of Ingush people is Ghalghai (Ingush: ГIалгIай, [ˈʁəlʁɑj]), which most often is associated with the word "ghāla" (гIала), meaning "tower" or "fortress" and the plural form of the suffix of person, "gha" (гIа), thus, translates as "people/inhabitants of towers", though according to some researchers the ethnonym has a more ancient origin. Some scholars associate it with the ancient Gargareans and Gelae mentioned in the 1st century in the work of the ancient historian and geographer Strabo. In Georgian sources, in the form of Gligvi, it is mentioned as an ethnonym that existed during the reign of Mirian I, as well as the ruler of Kakheti Kvirike III. In Russian sources, "Ghalghaï" first becomes known in the second half of the 16th century, in the form of "Kalkans/Kolkans", "Kalkan people".

== History ==
=== Ancient history ===
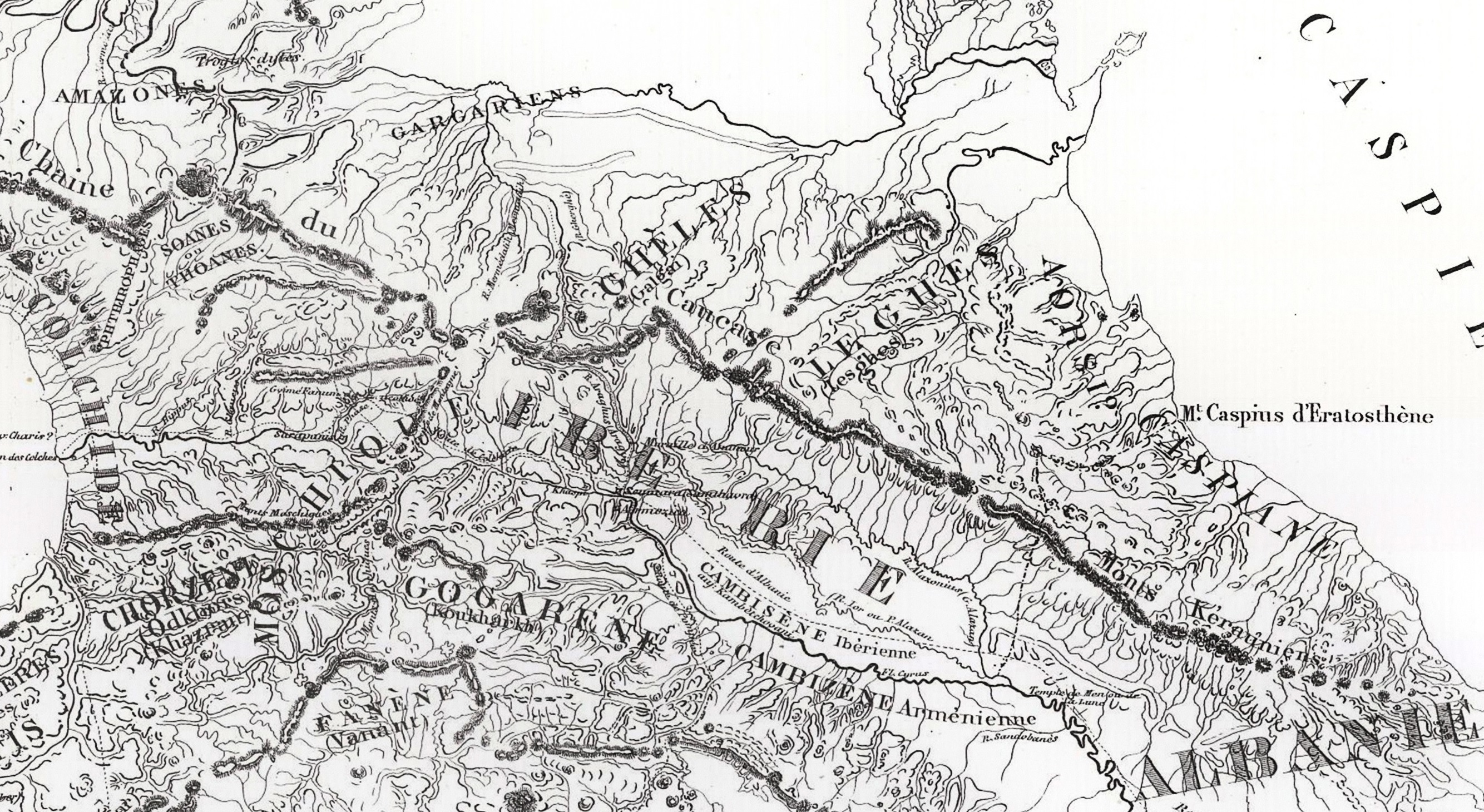
The Caucasus in the 1st century BC according to ancient Greek geographer Strabo, composed by Frédéric Dubois de Montpéreux

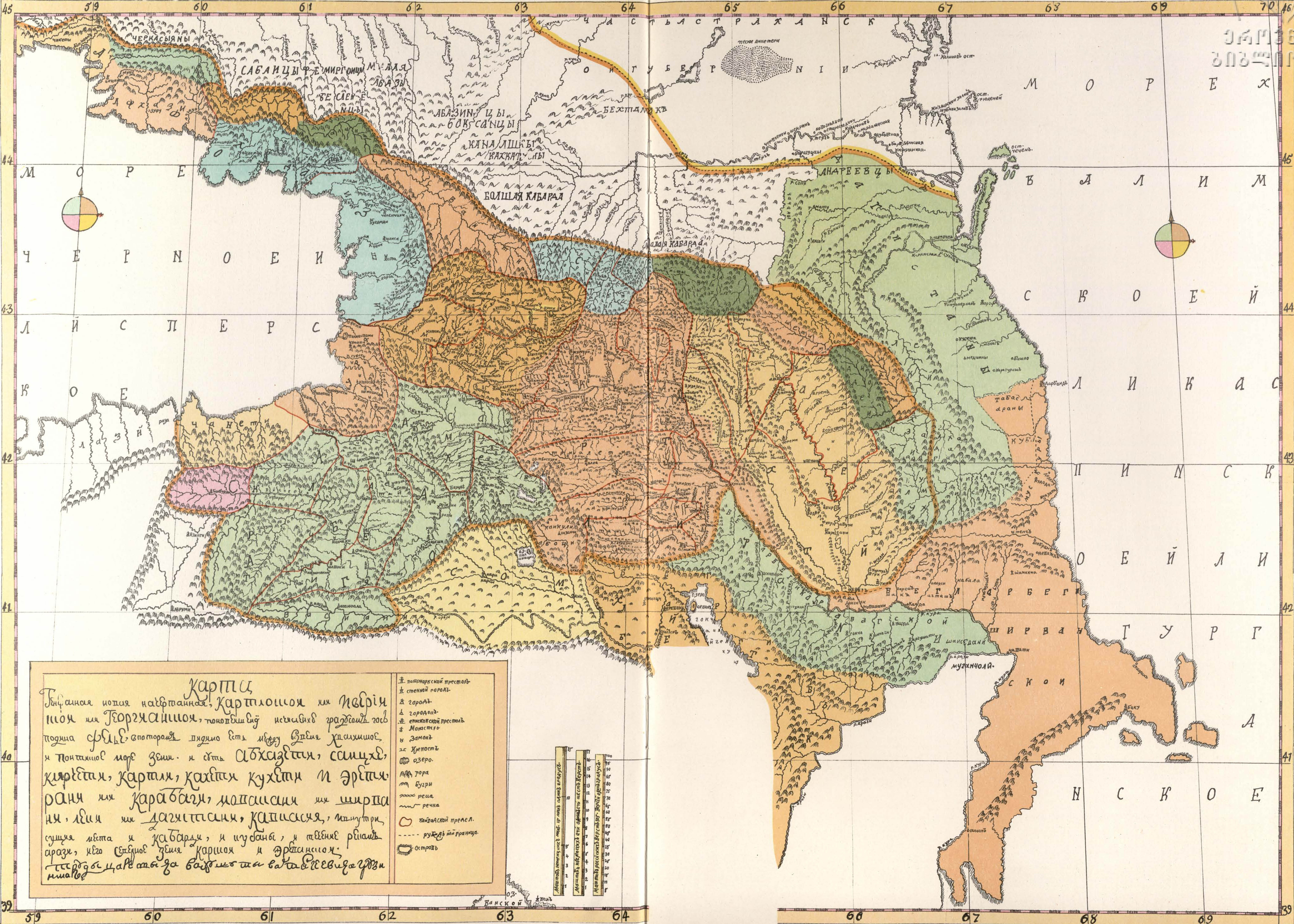
Map of Vakhushti Bagrationi in Russian depicting three Ingush societies: Kisti (Kists), Tsurtsuki (Dzurdzuks) and Ghlighvi (Gligvi) as parts of one country (Dzurdzuketi) and Chechens (Chachans) as part of Dagestan without common border with the Ingush

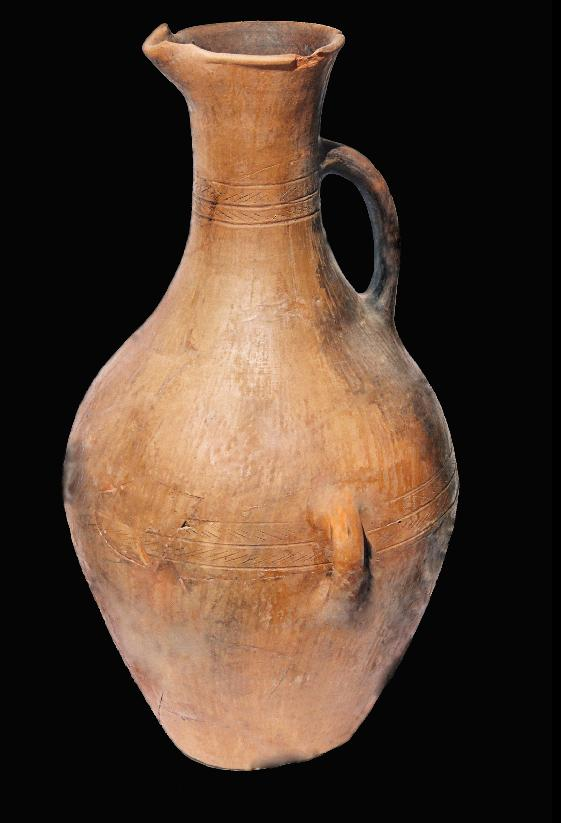
Pottery: an ancient Ingush vessel with three handles. The side handles used to tie the knots, and the vessel itself is well balanced for an operator to pour water down with one hand. Dzheyrakhsky District of Ingushetia.

In the 4th-3rd millennium BC in the North Caucasus, archaeological cultures of the early Bronze Age are spreading: Maykop and Kuro-Araxes. The territory of Ingushetia is located in the zone of their intersection and part of the early Bronze Age monuments found here has a characteristic syncretic appearance (for example, the Lugovoe settlement). With these cultures, several cultures are genetically linked, which were formed in the subsequent Middle Bronze Age and received in science the general name "North Caucasian cultural and historical community". In turn, on the basis of the cultures of the North Caucasian cultural and historical community, an ancient culture of the North Caucasian autochthonous peoples developed – the Koban culture, the chronological framework of which is usually determined by the 12th-4th centuries BC. (Note: Meanwhile, individual monuments are dated to an earlier period. At the same time, the development of the Koban culture in the Central Caucasus continued until the early Middle Ages.) It is with the tribes of the Koban culture that it is customary to link the ethnogenesis of the Proto-Ingush ethnic groups. In the written Georgian sources describing the events of this period, the ancestors of the Ingush (tribes of the Koban culture) are known under the ethnonym "Caucasians" and "Dzurdzuks", in ancient ones – under the name "Makhli". In the second half of the 1st millennium BC, Koban tribes created a large political union of tribes, known from ancient sources under the name Malkh (Makhli, Makhelonia), according to Georgian sources – Dzurdzuketi. The Dzurdzuks controlled the main Caucasian passage, the Darial Gorge, and had close political ties with the ancient Georgian state. According to Leonti Mroveli, the first king of Georgia, Pharnavaz, was married to a woman "from the tribe of Dzurdzuks, descendants of the Caucasus" and they had a son, Saurmag (Ingush: Сармак, romanized: Sarmak, lit. "dragon"). He ascended the Georgian throne after the death of his father Pharnavaz I of, and upon learning that the Georgian eristavis wanted to kill him, he and his mother took refuge with his maternal uncles in Dzurdzuketi. According to the ancient writer Lucian, the name of one of the rulers of the political association of the ancient Kobans is Adirmakh, whose name the Abkhaz researcher Gumba G. D. etymologizes with the help of the Ingush language as "the owner of the power of the sun". At the beginning of the 2nd century BC as a result of the military invasion of the North Caucasus by the Seleucid king Antiochus III, the political union of the Koban tribes was defeated. As a result of its collapse, common Koban names cease to be used in the sources, and later, in the 1st century BC – 1st century AD, the descendants of the Kobans are known in the sources under the names of individual tribal groups: "Khamekits", "Serbs", "Dvals", "Sanars/Tsanars", "Masakhs/Mashakhs", "Isadiks", and others.

The ethnonym "Gargareans" is associated with the tribes of the Koban culture, which is mentioned by the ancient Greek geographer Strabo in his work Geographica in the 1st century AD as a North Caucasian people living next to the Amazons. (Note: История Ингушетии 2013, p. 12 (basing their theory on История народов Северного Кавказа 1988, p. 74).) They are connected with the Ingush by several scholars. Strabo also mentioned Gelae which are like wise Gargareans, also connected with Ingush by several scholars.

In the 7th century, in the well-known chronicle, Ashkharhatsuyts, the Ingush were mentioned under the ethnonym Kusts (Kists).

In Georgian sources, the Ingush (Galgaï) are mentioned in the form of Gligvi during the reign of Mirian I (1st century), and also during the reign of the ruler of Kakheti, Kvirike III, in the 11th century.

=== Middle Ages ===
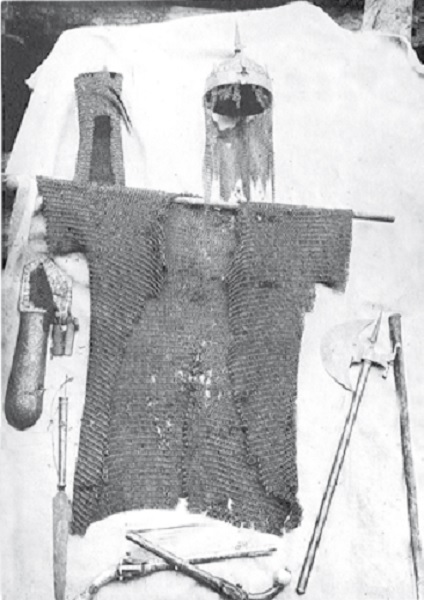
Armament of a medieval Ingush warrior. Found in the crypt of the village of Ozdig. Photo (1921)

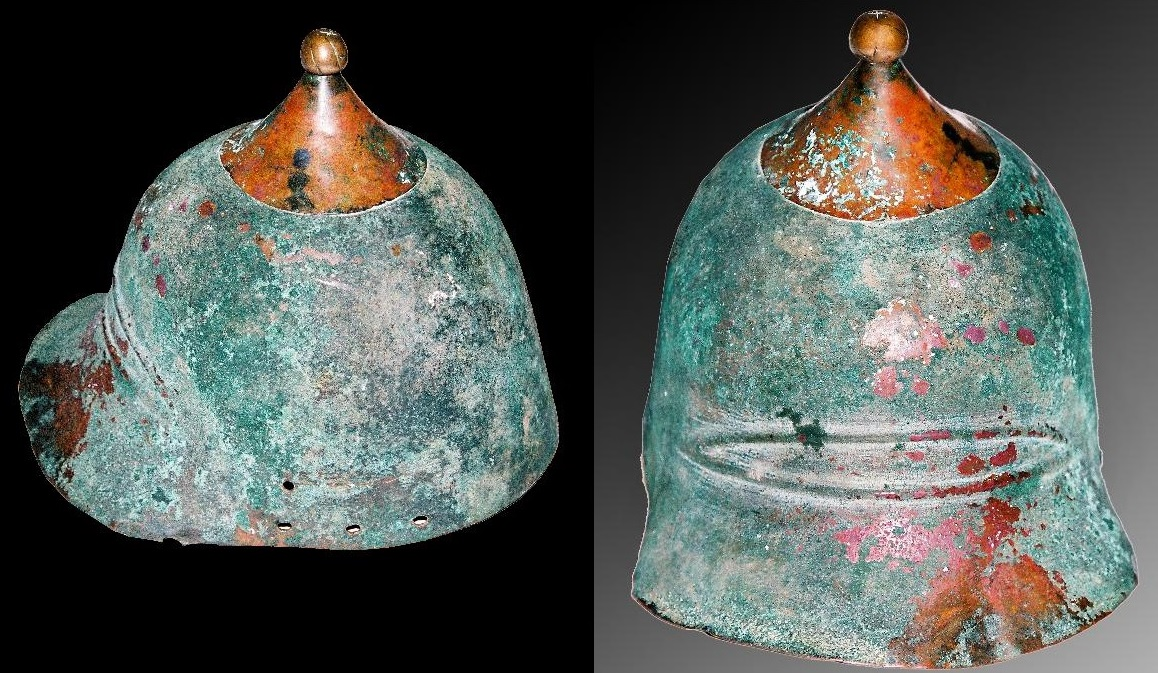
Ingush male warrior helmet

In the late 9th – early 13th centuries, the history of the Ingush was closely connected with the Alans their kingdom, Alania, to which the Ingush belonged. It's known that the population of Alania was diverse and included Ingush. According to Ingush researchers, the capital of Alania – the city of Magas was located on the territory of Ingushetia in the area covering part of the modern cities of Magas, Nazran and the villages of Yandare, Gazi-Yurt, Ekazhevo, Ali-Yurt and Surkhakhi, that is, in the area where numerous monuments of the Alanian time are located. On the designated territory there are a number of Alanian settlements. The researchers noted that many settlements here are located in groups or "nests" within sight. In some of these groups, as a rule, one of the central settlements stands out for its large size, fortification and complexity of planning, to which less significant ones gravitate. The "nested" location of the settlements is associated with strong tribal remnants in the respective society. According to V. B. Vinogradov, this area of the group of monuments is one of the largest in the North Caucasus.

In 1238–1240 the plain of the North Caucasus was conquered by the Mongol-Tatars and included in the Ulus of Jochi. In 1395, the association of the Alans was finally destroyed during the campaign against the North Caucasus by Tamerlane, and the remaining population retreated to the mountains. The collapse of Alania and the outflow to the mountains of its population, which was entrenched to the east and west of the Darial by building fortresses, served as the basis for the formation of new ethnoterritorial communities, which in turn led to the formation of modern North Caucasian peoples.

Villages located in the mountainous zone were grouped mainly along local gorges, which contributed to their ethnopolitical consolidation into separate territorial groups/districts – communities (Ingush: шахьараш). By the end of the 16th century, the main territorial societies of the Ingush had already formed. Based on the data of Russian sources of the 16th–17th centuries, naming several territorial societies of the Ingush, it is concluded that in Ingushetia and in the 15th century there were approximately the same number of political formations (shahar societies), each of which united several villages.

From the west, starting from the Darial Gorge, to the east, existes several Ingush societies, such as: Dzherakh ("Erokhan people"), Kistins, Fyappins, or Metskhalins, Chulkhoy, Khamkhins ("Kyakalins"), Tsorins, Akkins, Orstkhoy, and to the south of them, the societies of Merzhoy, Tsechoy, Galai. To the southeast of the Tsorins was the society of Malkhins.

Over time, the number and boundaries of societies changed, this happened as a result of migration processes of the Ingush-speaking population, including those associated with the return of the Ingush to the plane (plain). They began quite early, soon after Timur left the North Caucasus. At a very early stage, they were in the nature of individual military-political actions undertaken by the Ingush on the plain lands in order to counteract the consolidation of alien nomadic peoples on them. Separate episodes associated with this time are reflected in one of the Ingush legends, recorded in the 19th century by ethnographer Albast Tutaev, where representatives of the Galgaï Society of Mountainous Ingushetia appear. Also, the people's memory has preserved the most important episodes from the events associated with the development of plain lands. In particular, the legend recorded in the mountain village of Pkhamat by I.A. Dakhkilgov, tells how eminent men of several territorial communities of mountainous Ingushetia gathered to unite the country. The participants decided that from now on they will all be referred to by a single name – "Ghalghaï", stop strife and begin to move out in an organized manner. Probably, these events were associated with the development of land in the upper reaches of the Sunzha and Kambileevka, where the oldest settlements of the Ingush Akhki-Yurt and Angusht arose. The colonization of this zone, likely, was carried out during the 16th-17th centuries, and received activation with further advancement to the north, after the departure of the Kabardians from Sunzha and Kambileevka, around from the 1730s.

=== Contacts with Russian Empire ===
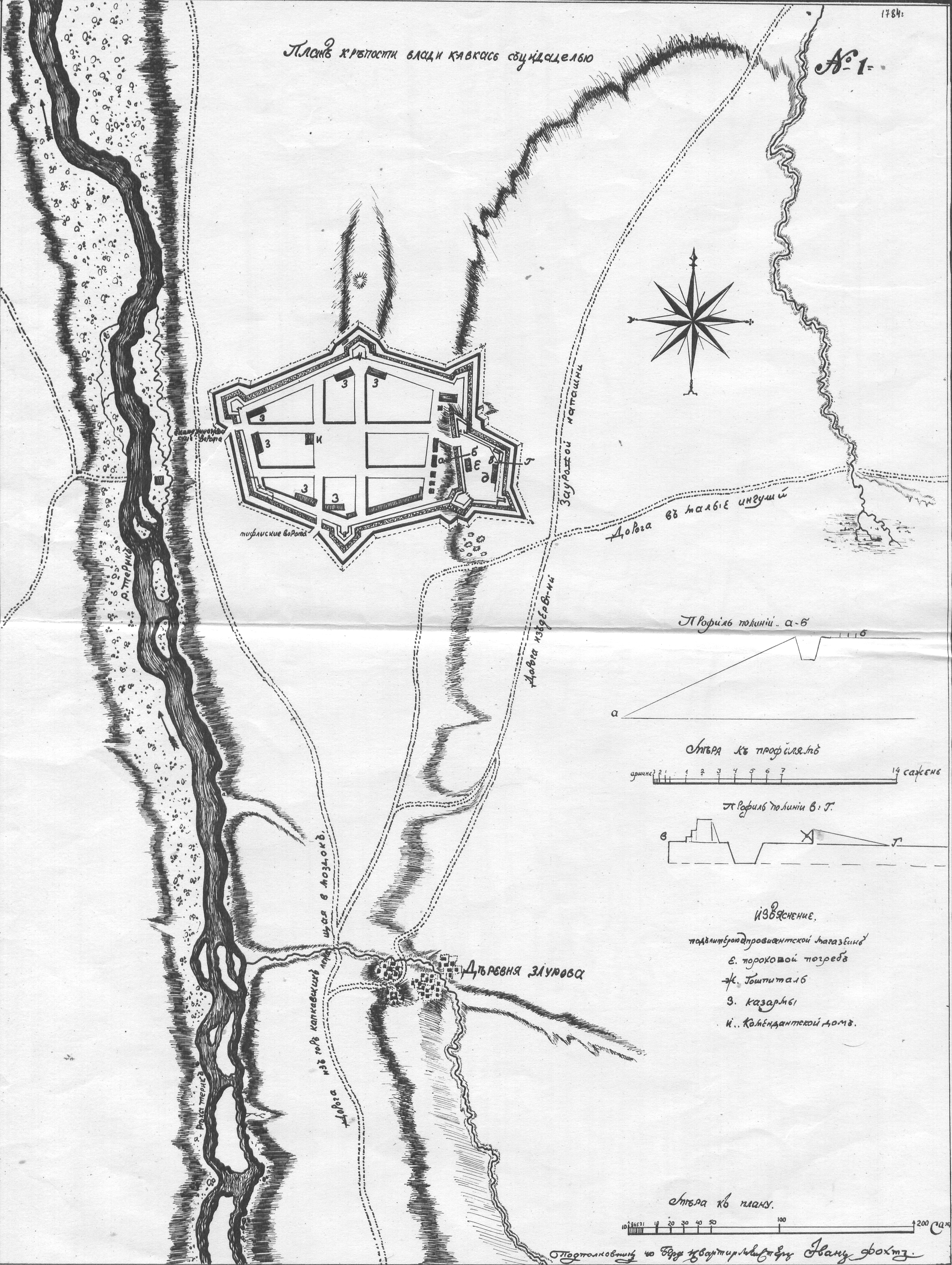
The plan of the fortress Vladikavkaz and the Ingush village of Zaur (1784)

In the 18th century, the process of returning the Ingush to their fertile lands in the Sunzha and Terek basins was completed. On March 4–6, 1770, with a large gathering of people near the foothill village of Angusht in a clearing with the symbolic name "Barta-Bos" ("Slope of Agreement"), 24 Ingush elders swore an oath of allegiance to the Russian Empire. This event was attended by German academician J. A. Güldenstädt, who described it in his work "Journey through Russia and the Caucasus Mountains." However it is worth saying that even after the oath of individual Ingush society or clans, the former Russian-Ingush relations remained the same. In fact, both sides took these types of oaths as a conclusion union treaties.

The interfluve of the Terek and Sunzha, through which the road to Georgia passed, acquires strategic importance for Russia during this period. This territory was mastered by the Ingush no later than the end of the 17th – beginning of the 18th century. According to J. A. Güldenstädt, there were many Ingush villages on the banks of the Sunzha and Kambileyevka rivers. Angusht was the center of the district, known as the "Great Ingush". Settlers from the "Great Ingush" formed a new colony "Small Ingush", the center of which was the village of Sholkhi. In the future, the Ingush advance to the Nazran Valley.

In 1781, at the confluence of the river Nazranka with the Sunzha, people from the Angusht region founded the village of Nazran (Nyasare). In the same year, the quartermaster of the Russian army, L. L. Städer, noted an Ingush outpost on this territory. Thus, in 1781 the Nazran Valley was already controlled by the Ingush.

In May 1784, in connection with the need to establish reliable communication routes with the territory of Georgia, either near, or, on the territory of the Ingush village of Zaur (Zovr-Kov), the Vladikavkaz fortress was founded. Vladikavkaz became the economic, political and cultural center of the Ingush and one of the most important cities in the North Caucasus.

=== Caucasian War ===
During the 19th century, the Ingush bitterly resisted the Russian Empire's expansion in the region during the Caucasian War and they were considered "half-conquered". Therefore, during the war, there was a series of military expeditions of Russians done to Ingushetia.

In July 1830, two Russian columns under the command of Major General Abkhazov made a punitive expedition to mountainous Ingushetia. The Russian troops went through the Darial and Assa gorges. Especially the inhabitants of Eban put up a courageous resistance against the Russian troops. On November 12, 1836, Baron Rosen reported in letter to count Alexander Chernyshyov that in 1830, the highlanders of Dzherakh, Kist, and Galgai societies were briefly subdued by Russia. As a result of the expedition, district courts were established and a civil system was introduced to mountainous Ingushetia.

In July 1832, Russian troops consisting also of Ossetian and Georgian detachments (Note: Rosen explained the presence of the Ossetian and Georgian highlanders with his army as follows: Similar to the highest permission to use the mountain dwellers alone against others to strengthen mutual their hatred, are with my detachment Ossetians living near Vladikavkaz, and militia from mountaineers living in the Military Georgian Road from Lars to Pasanaur, belonging to Georgia, under the name mountain peoples.) made another punitive expedition to mountainous Ingushetia, this time under the command of Baron Rosen, who at the time was commander-in-chief of the troops in the North Caucasus. The reason of this expedition was the murder of bailiff Konstantinov by the inhabitants of the village of Khuli. As a result of the expedition, many Ingush villages were exterminated with the arable lands being spoiled and a large number of livestock being stolen.

Ingush participated in many uprisings of Chechnya, twice in two different uprisings in 1822 as well as the uprising of Chechnya in 1840 during which two Ingush societies – Galashians and Karabulaks joined the Caucasian Imamate after swearing allegiance to Imam Shamil in Urus-Martan.

Regarding general uprising of Chechnya that happened in March 1840, General Pavel Grabbe reported on March 30, 1840, as follows:

Whole Greater Chechnya was transferred to him, as well as the Michik and Ichkerin residents and many Aukhites; the Kachkalyks are kept in obedience only by the presence of our detachment. Some of the Karabulak and Ingush villages, all the Galgai and Kists are also in great agitation and are secretly or openly assisting the rebel.

The 1840–1850s are considered the peak of Caucasian Imamate, during which, number of Ingush societies (Vilayet Kalay), some Tsorin and Galgai auls were part of it.

The Eclectic Review wrote in 1854 about the resistance of the Ingush against the Russian expansion in the region as follows:

The Ingushes, Tshetshenes, and Karabulaks inhabit the steep fastnesses above the gates of the Caucasus, their territory being bounded by the river Sunja and the lesser Kabarda. They speak kindred dialects, and are united for carrying on a war of depredation against the encroaching Russians. Often defeated, they always rise again; and are never disheartened by the destruction of their farms and fields.

— Stowell, William Hendry (1854). Parked, Daniel; Hood, Edwin Paxton; Ryland, Jonathan Edwards; Conder, Josiah; Greatheed, Samuel; Williams, Theophilus; Thomas, Price (eds.). The Eclectic review. Vol. 7. London: C. Taylor. p. 350.

In the late 1840s to late 1850s, the construction of a chain of Cossack villages began on the flat area of Ingushetia. The Ingush were expelled from the lowland villages to the mountains and foothills, Cossack villages were founded in the territories. (Note: Stanitsa Assinovskaya was founded on the territory of village of Akhborze in 1847; Stanitsa Nesterovskaya was founded on the territory of village of Ghazhien-Yurt in 1847; Stanitsa Troitskaya was founded on the territory of village of Ebarg-Yurt in 1847; Stanitsa Sleptsovskaya was founded on the territory of town of Dibir-Ghala (town) in 1847; Stanitsa Voznesenskaya was founded on the territory of village of Magomet-Khite in 1847; Stanitsa Sunzhenskaya was founded on the territory of village of Akhi-Yurt in 1859; Stanitsa Tarskaya was founded on the territory of village of Angusht in 1859; Stanitsa Karabulakskaya was founded on the territory of village of Ildir-Ghala; Stanitsa Feldmarshalskaya was founded on the territory of village of Alkhaste in 1860; Stanitsa Vorontsov-Dashkov was founded on the territory of village of Tauzen-Yurt in 1861; Khutor Tarski was founded on the territory of village of Sholkhi in 1867.)

=== As a part of the Russian Empire ===
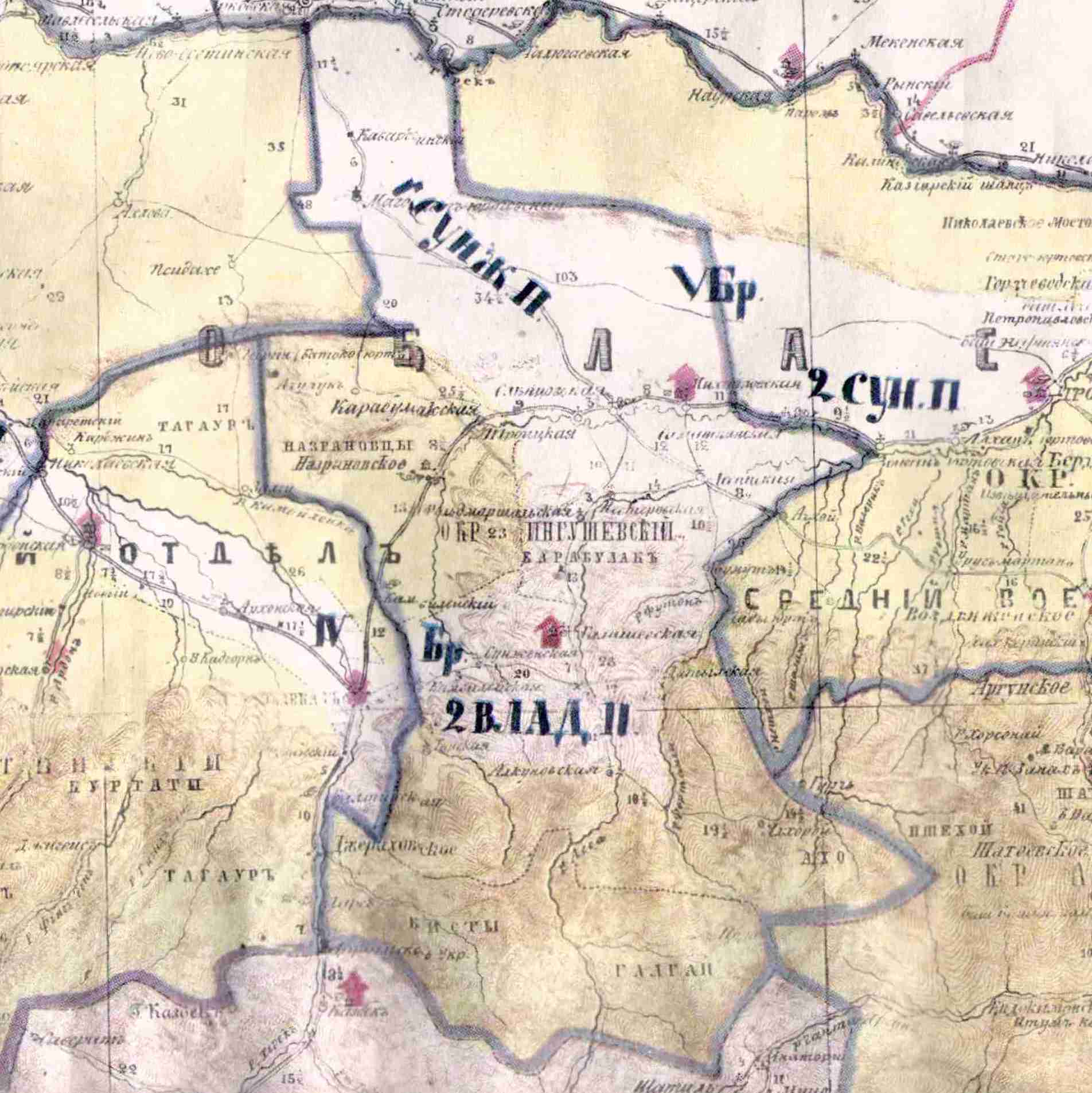
Ingush district on the Road map of the Caucasus region in (1853)

In 1860, the territory of Ingushetia formed the Ingushskiy Okrug as part of the Terek Oblast. In 1870, the Ingushskiy Okrug was merged with the Ossetinskiy Okrug into the Vladikavkazsky Okrug. In 1888, the Vladikavkazsky Okrug was disbanded, and the Ingush-Cossack Sunzhensky Otdel was formed on the site of the Ingushshkiy Okrug. In 1909, the Sunzhensky Otdel was divided into two okrugs – Sunzhensky and Nazranovskiy.

According to the 1897 census, the number of Ingush in the Russian Empire was 47,409 people.

=== In the USSR ===
In 1923, the Ingush alphabet was introduced based on the Latin alphabet, developed by Zaurbek Malsagov. On May 1, 1923, the first newspaper in the Ingush language, Serdalo, was published. New schools appeared in the villages of Gamurzievo, Bazorkino, and Yandare. Muslim schools – madrasahs – still functioned.

According to the 1926 census, 74,097 Ingush lived in the USSR, and according to the 1939 census, their number was 92,120 people.

==== Genocide of 1944 ====
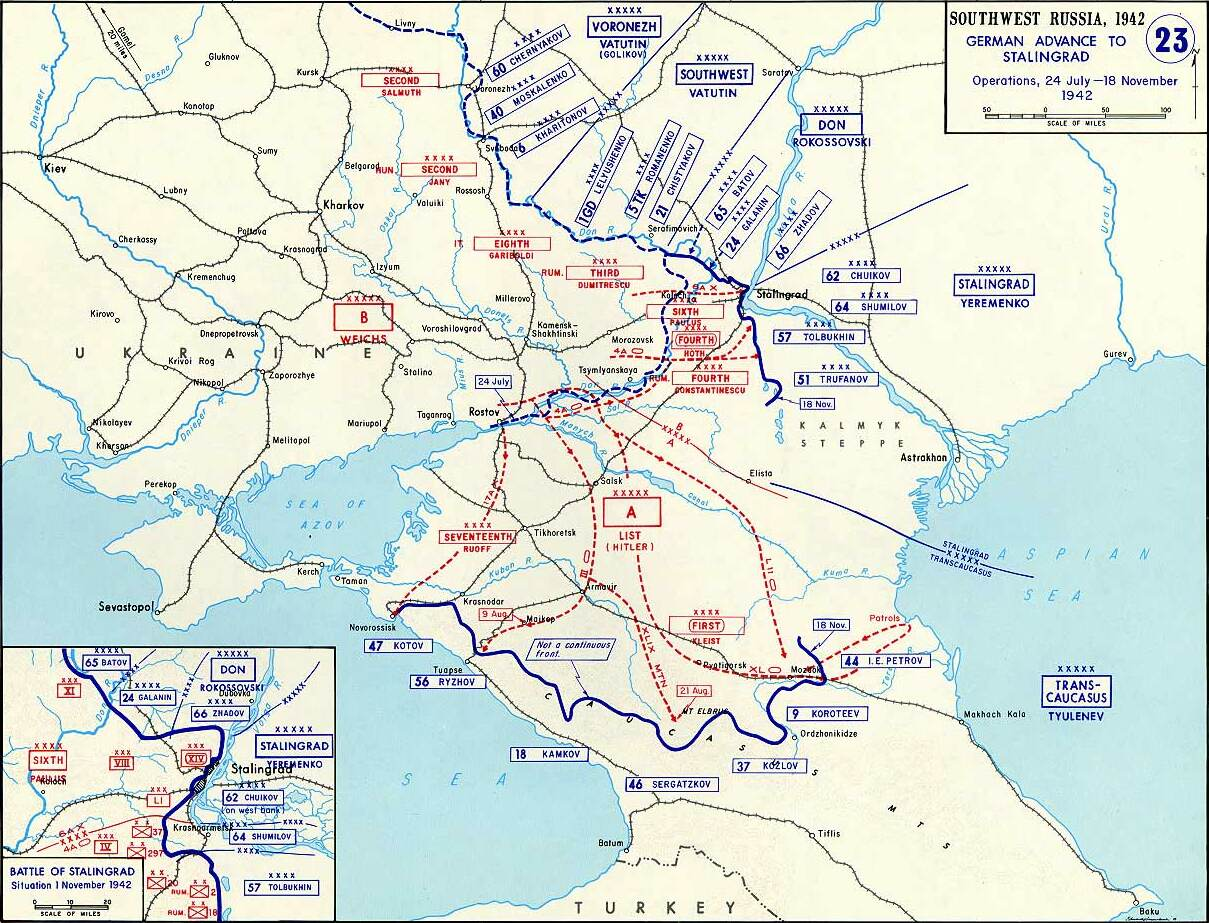
World War II, 1942 The Northern Caucasian battle, front line in Chechen-Ingush ASSR from Ordzhonikidze (Vladikavkaz) to Malgobek.

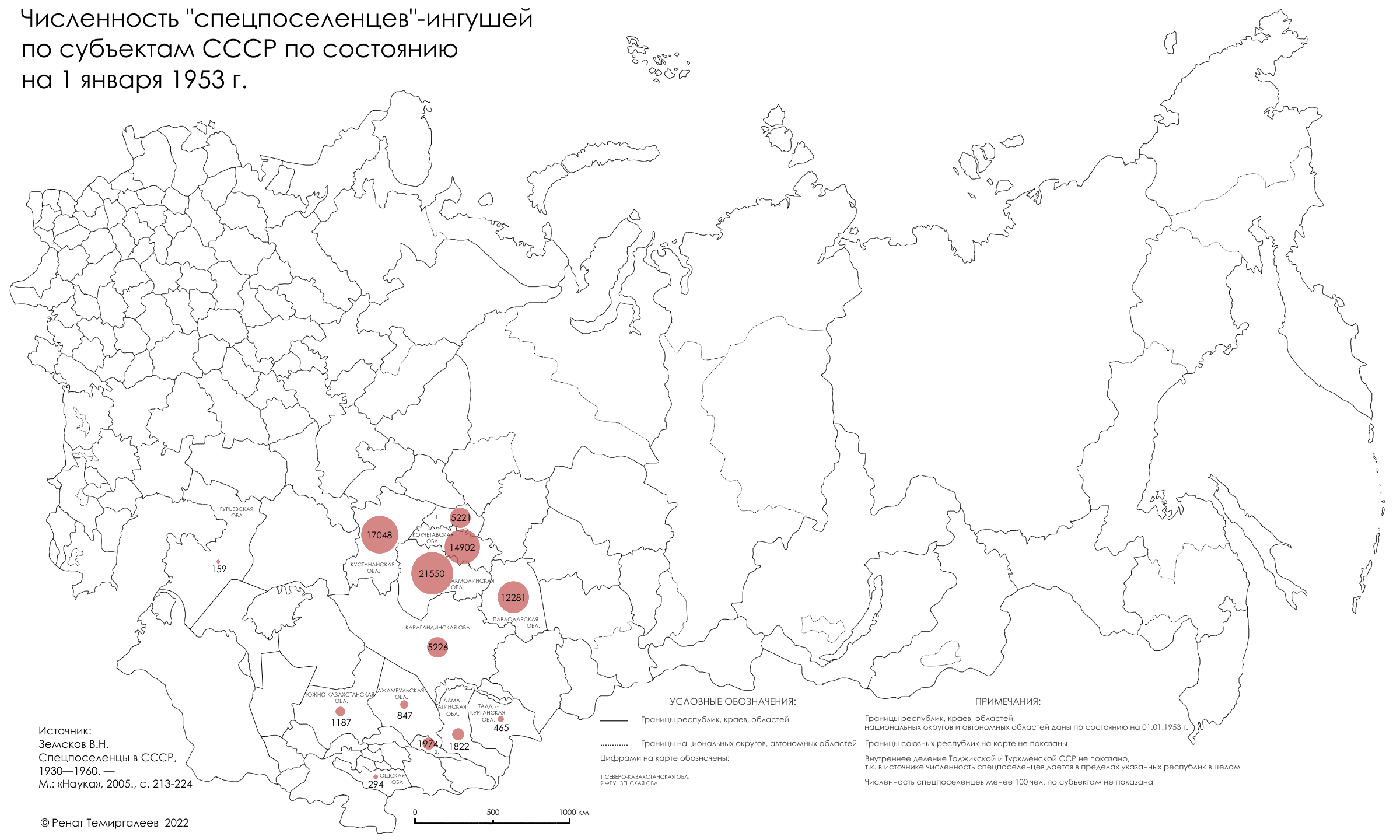
Ingush in deportation: the number of "special settlers"-Ingush in the subjects of the USSR on January 1, 1953

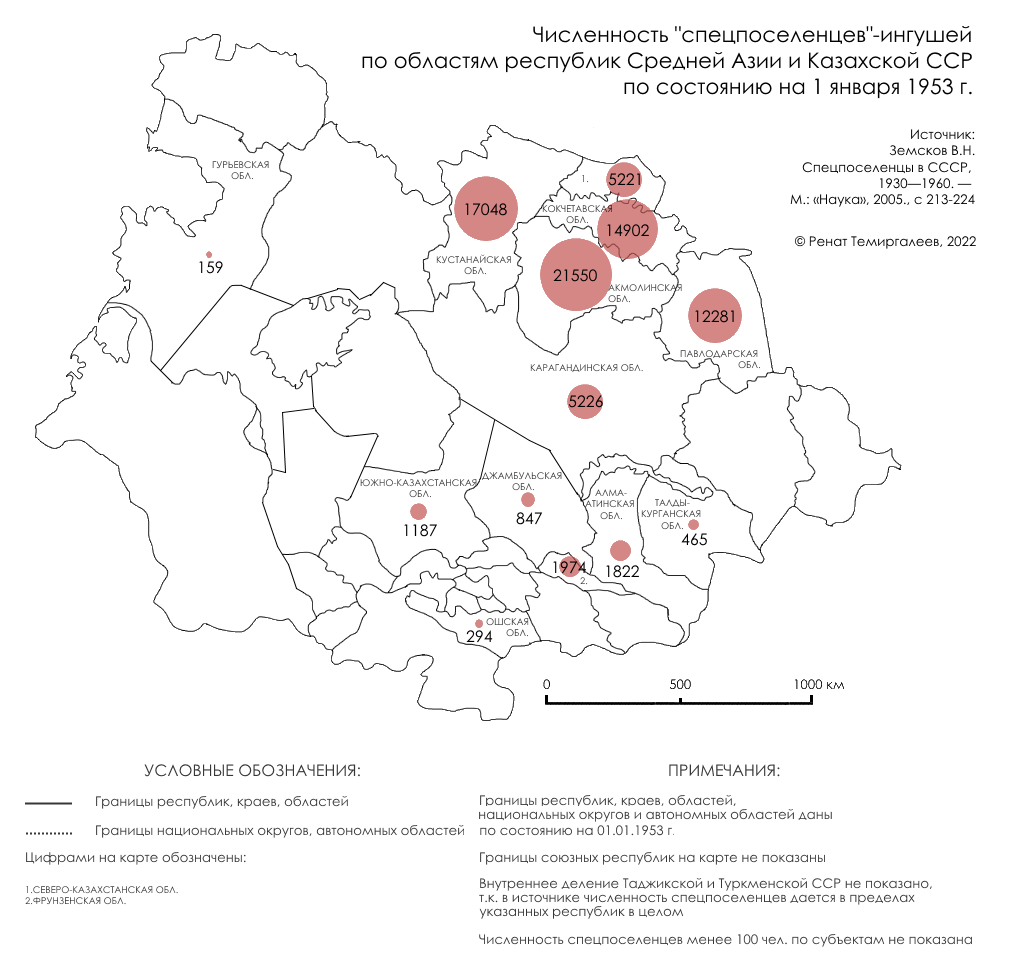
Ingush in deportation: the number of "special settlers"-Ingush in the regions of the republics of Central Asia and the Kazakh SSR on January 1, 1953

During World War II, in 1942 German forces entered the North Caucasus. For three weeks Germans captured over half of the North Caucasus. They were only stopped at two Checheno-Ingush cities: Malgobek and Ordzhonikidze (a.k.a. "Vladikavkaz") by heroic resistance of natives of Chechen-Ingush ASSR.

On 23 February 1944, Ingush and Chechens were falsely accused of collaborating with the Nazis, and the entire Ingush and Chechen populations were deported to Kazakhstan, Uzbekistan, and Siberia in Operation Lentil, on the orders of Soviet leader Joseph Stalin, while the majority of their men were fighting on the front. The Checheno-Ingush ASSR was liquidated and the territory of Ingushetia was divided between the newly created Grozny Oblast and Georgian SSR. The initial phase of the deportation was carried out on American-supplied Studebaker trucks specifically modified with three submachine gun-nest compartments above the deported to prevent escapes. American historian Norman Naimark writes:

Troops assembled villagers and townspeople, loaded them onto trucks – many deportees remembered that they were Studebakers, fresh from Lend-Lease deliveries over the Iranian border – and delivered them at previously designated railheads. ...Those who could not be moved were shot. ...[A] few fighters aside, the entire Chechen and Ingush nations, 496,460 people, were deported from their homeland.

The deportees were gathered on the railroad stations and during the second phase transferred to the cattle railroad carts. Up to 30% of the population perished during the journey or in the first year of the exile. The Prague Watchdog claims that "in the early years of their exile about half of the Chechens and Ingush died from hunger, cold and disease". The deportation was classified by the European Parliament in 2004 as genocide. After the deportation Ingush resistance against Soviets rises again. Those who escaped the deportation, shepherds who were high in the mountains during the deportation combine forces and form rebel groups which constantly attack Russian forces in Ingushetia. Major rebel groups were led by Akhmed Khuchbarov, Tsitskiev brothers, and Ingush femalesniper Laisat Baisarova. The last one of the male Ingush rebels was killed in 1977 by the KGB officers, while Baisarova was never captured or killed. American professor Johanna Nichols, who specializes in Chechen and Ingush philology, provided the theory behind the deportation:

In 1944 the nationalities themselves were abolished and their lands resettled when the Chechen and Ingush, together with the Karachay-Balkar, Crimean Tatars, and other nationalities were deported en masse to Kazakhstan and Siberia, losing at least one-quarter and perhaps half of their population in transit. (The reason, never clarified, seems to have been Stalin's wish to clear all Muslims from the main invasion routes in a contemplated attack on Turkey.)

In the early 1990s, the Ossetian side put forward a version that "instead of the Prigorodny District", the Naur and Shelkovskaya districts of the Stavropol Territory were included in the restored Checheno-Ingushetia in 1957 (until 1957 these districts were part of the Grozny region). However, the transfer of these regions to Checheno-Ingushetia cannot be considered as "compensation" for the Prigorodny region.

According to the all-Union census of 1959, the number of Ingush was 105,980 people.

Since the return of the Ingush, they have advocated the return of the torn territories, for the creation of their own statehood. These performances reached their apogee in 1973 – at a rally in Grozny, organized by the Ingush demanding the return of the Prigorodny district. According to all-Union censuses, the number of Ingush continued to grow: for example, the total number of Ingush in the USSR in 1979 amounted to 186,198 people, and according to the 1989 census – 237,438 people.

Since 1988, informal organizations have been created in Ingushetia, various movements have appeared ("Nijsxo", "Däqaste", "People's Council"), which set as their goal the creation of Ingush statehood within the Russian Federation with the return of all territories torn away during the deportation. Formally, the Ingush were rehabilitated in their rights on April 26, 1991, when the law "On the Rehabilitation of Victims of Political Repressions" was adopted at the 1st Congress of the Supreme Soviet of the RSFSR. This law became a kind of catalyst for the restoration of historical and social justice for other millions of citizens of the former Soviet Union.

=== Present time ===
In 1992, the Law "On the Formation of the Ingush Republic as part of the Russian Federation" was adopted (see Ingushetia). In October–November, the Ossetian-Ingush conflict around the Prigorodny district of North Ossetia escalated into armed clashes. According to the Russian prosecutor's office, during the clashes as a result of the conflict, 583 people died (350 Ingush and 192 Ossetians), 939 people were injured (457 Ingush and 379 Ossetians), another 261 people went missing (208 Ingush and 37 Ossetians), from 30 to 60 thousand Ingush were forced to move from Vladikavkaz and the Prigorodny district to Ingushetia.

In 1995, the new capital of Ingushetia, the city of Magas, was founded.

=== Resistance ===
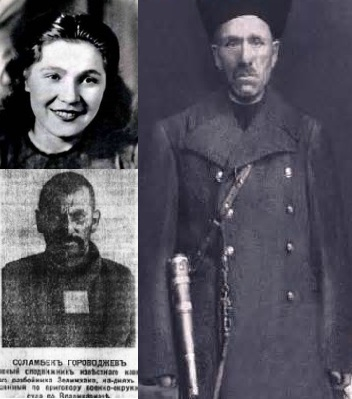
Famous Ingush rebels. Top left: Ingush sniper Laisat Baisarova. Lower left: Sulumbek of Sagopshi. Right: Akhmed Khuchbarov.

- 1800s–1860s: Insurgency against Russian conquest.
- 1860s–1890s: Raids of Ingush abreks on the Georgian Military Highway and Mozdok.
- 1890s–1917: Insurgency of Ingush resistance under Chechen abrek Zelimkhan and Ingush abrek Sulumbek, execution of Russian viceroy to Ingushetia colonel Mitnik by Ingush resistance fighter Buzurtanov.
- 1917–1920s: Insurgency of Ingush resistance fighters against combined Russian White Guards, Cossacks, Ossetians, and general Denikin forces.
- 1920s–1930s: Insurgency of Ingush people against Communists, executions of Communist leader of Ingushetia Chernoglaz by Ingush rebel Uzhakhov. Execution of Communist party leader of Ingushetia Ivanov by Ingush rebels.
- 1944–1977: Ingush rebels avenging the deportation of the Ingush nation. Scores of Russian army units and NKVD, KGB officers killed.
- 1992: Ossetian-Ingush conflict. In combat operations Ingush rebels capture armor which later transferred to Chechens or given back to Russian army after the conflict ended.
- 1994: Nazran. Ingush civilians stop Russian army, flip armor, burn military trucks which were on the march to Chechnya in Russian-Chechen war. First Russian casualties reported from hands of Ingush rebels.
- 1994–1996: Ingush rebels defend Grozny and participate in combat operations on Chechen side.
- 1999–2006: Ingush rebels join Chechen rebels, the independence war turns into Jihad.
- 13 July 2001: Ingush people protest "defiling and desecration" of historical Christian Ingush church Tkhaba-Yerdy after Russian troops made the church into a public toilet. Though Ingush are Muslims they highly respect their Christian past.
- 15 September 2003: Ingush rebels use bomb truck and attack FSB headquarters in Maghas. Several dozens of Russian FSB officers killed including the senior officer overseeing the FSB in Chechen republic. The several story HQ building is severely damaged.
- 6 April 2004: Ingush rebels attack Russian appointed president of Ingushetia Murat Zyazikov. He was wounded when a car bomb was rammed into his motorcade.
- 22 June 2004: Chechen and Ingush rebels raid on Russian troops in Ingushetia. Hundreds of Russian troops killed.
- 31 August 2008: Execution of Magomed Yevloyev Ingush dissident, journalist, lawyer, businessman, and the owner of the news website Ingushetiya.ru, known for being highly critical of Russian regime in Ingushetia. He was shot in the temple. Awarded posthumously, and his name is engraved in stone on the monuments at the Journalists' Memorials in Bayeux, France and Washington D.C., the United States.
- 30 September 2008: A suicide bomber attacked the motorcade of Ruslan Meiriyev, Ingushetia's top police official.
- 10 June 2009: Snipers killed Aza Gazgireyeva, deputy chief justice of the regional Supreme Court, as she dropped her children off at school. Russian news agencies also cited investigators as saying she was likely killed for her role in investigating the 2004 attack on Ingush police forces by Chechen fighters.
- 13 June 2009: Two gunmen sprayed former deputy prime minister Bashir Aushev with automatic-weapon fire as he got out of his car at the gate outside his home in the region's main city, Nazran.
- 22 June 2009: Russian appointed president of Ingushetia Yunus-Bek Yevkurov was badly hurt when a suicide bomber detonated a car packed with explosives as the president's convoy drove past. The attack killed three bodyguards.
- 12 August 2009: Gunmen killed construction minister Ruslan Amerkhanov in his office in the Ingush capital, Magas.
- 17 August 2009: A suicide bomber killed 21 Ingush police officers and unknown numbers of Russian Internal Ministry troops which were stationed in Nazran, after he drove a truck full of explosives into a MVD police base.
- 25 October 2009: Execution of Maksharip Aushev, an Ingush businessman, dissident, and a vocal critic of Russian regime policies in Ingushetia. His body had over 60 bullet holes. Awarded posthumously by the U.S. Department of State in 2009.
- 5 April 2010: A suicide bomber injured three police officers in the town of Karabulak. Two officers died at the hospital as a result of their injuries. While investigators arrived on scene, another car bomb was set off by remote. Nobody was hurt in the second blast.
- 24 January 2011: A suicide bomber, Magomed Yevloyev (same first and last name as the slain Ingush opposition journalist Magomed Yevloyev), killed 37 people at Domodedovo airport, Moscow, Russia.
- 2012: Ingush rebels participate in war against Assad, Iranian, and Russian advisors in Syria which is largely viewed by the Ingush rebels as war against Russia and the Iranian-speaking Ossetians. The rebel Ingush commanders are veterans of Ossetian-Ingush conflict, wars in Chechnya, Daud Khalukhayev from Ingush village of Palanazh (Katsa), and a descendant of Ingush deportees of 1860's Syrian-born Ingush Walid Didigov.
- 6 June 2013: Accusation of Ingush rebel leader Ali "Maghas" Taziev in Rostov-On-Don regional Russian court, who was captured after he voluntarily given himself up in on 9 June 2010 to Russian forces in Ingushetia on the agreement that Russians will liberate his relatives held hostage on one of the Russian military bases.
- 27 August 2013: Execution of the head of security of Ingushetia Akhmet Kotiev and his bodyguard by Ingush rebels. Kotiev was actively involved in the assassination of Magomed Yevloyev.
- 10 December 2013: Ingush opposition leader Magomed Khazbiev, who was a close friend of assassinated Magomed Yevloyev, attends Euromaidan in Ukraine and participates in anti-Russian campaign there after which his parents were threatened and harassed in Russia. On his website he writes: "the fact that Putin's slaves harass my parents do not make any sense, if you [Russians] want me to stop you have to kill me like Magomed Yevloyev and Makhsharip Aushev".
- 2 February 2014: Russian FSB officially confirms that in the middle of December 2013 four North Caucasian instructors operate in Ukraine, and prepare Ukrainians for street battles against Russian interests.
- 20 April 2014: Famous Ingush human rights defender Ibrgim Lyanov stated that Ingushetia wants to separate from Russia and become an independent state using the example of the Crimean separation from Ukraine.
- 24 May 2014: Ingush rebel leader Arthur Getagazhev, 4 rebels, and 2 civilians were killed in action in the village of Sagopshi by Russian forces.
- 2 July 2014: After several months of denial, pro-Russian president of Ingushetia finally recognizes that Ingush rebels are fighting in Ukraine against pro-Russia forces.
- 2 July 2014: Ingush rebels attack Russian armored military convoy killing 1 and wounding 7 soldiers.
- 6 July 2014: Russian special forces prepared an ambush near the morgue in Nazran hospital where the body of Arthur Getagazhev was located. The intelligence reported that Ingush rebels will try to recover the body of the slain leader. The intelligence was correct. Radio Free Europe (section specializing in the Caucasus), reports that in the middle of the day 2 Ingush rebels attacked the ambush, according to unofficial source two rebels killed 7 and wounded 4 Russian FSB and spetsnaz officers in less than 40 seconds, after which the rebels left the scene unharmed. The source in Ingush police who wanted to stay anonymous said that exact number of killed are known only by the FSB but nobody would dare to declare if officially. According to pro-Kremlin LifeNews released video the attack lasted less than 19 seconds.
- 26 March 2019: Thousands of people in Ingushetia have protested against a controversial border deal with neighboring Chechnya, denouncing land swaps under the agreement and calling for Ingushetia head Yunus-Bek Yevkurov to step down.
- 25 June 2019: Yunus-Bek Yevkurov, has announced his resignation after almost 11 years in the position. De facto Ingushetia has no active leader. Civil protests continue, Ingush people boycotting the Russian appointed elections.

== Anthropological type ==
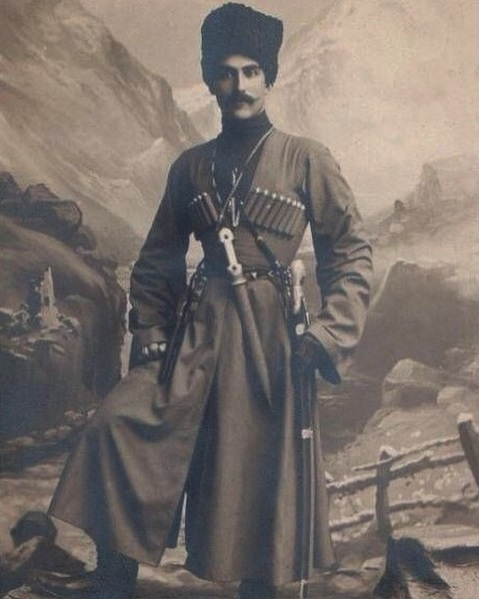
Ingush man, 1901

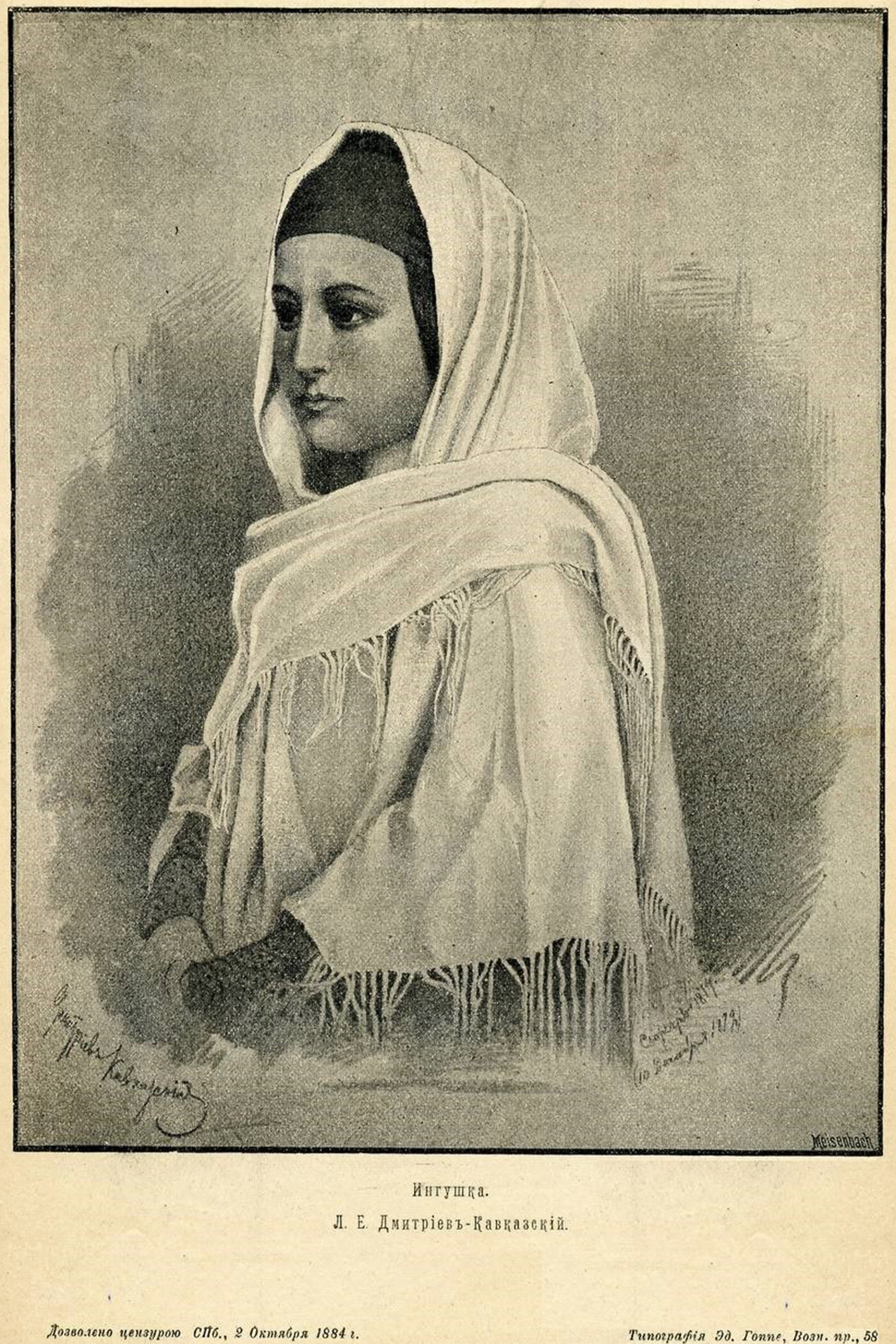
Ingush woman, 1884

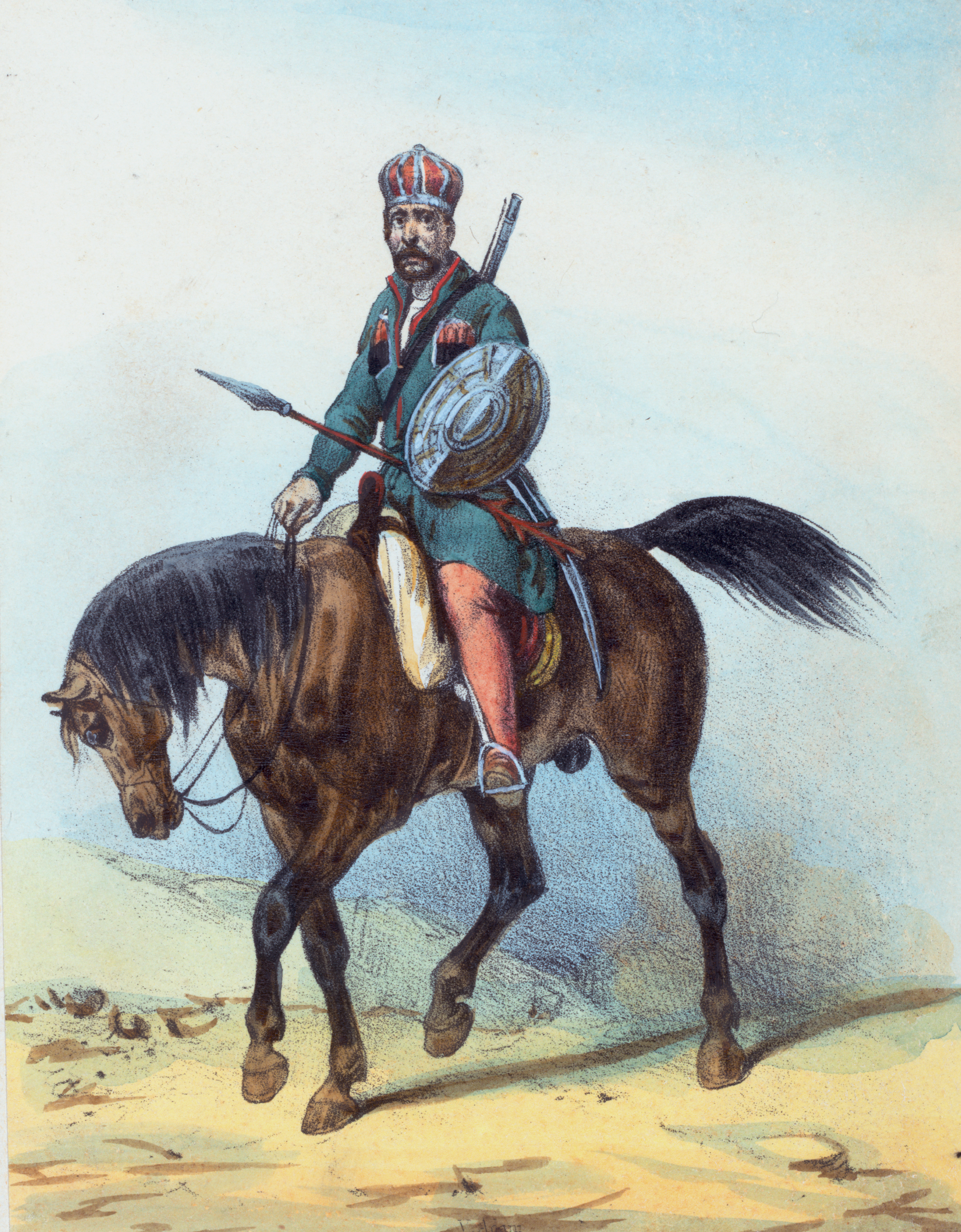
Ingush rider (1830) by Jean Victor Adam

The Ingush are traditionally a classless society based on a clan system and unwritten law. Approximately 350 clans live in Ingushetia today. Every clan, and each clan member, are viewed as equal. Unlike neighboring nations in the Caucasus, the Ingush rarely had social superiors or inferiors. In 1781, during his travels from the Mozdok fortress to the inner Caucasus, Leonti von Städer described the Ingush as "outwardly free, fierce and serious; ardent in speech, yet pacified rather quickly; their feelings are manifested sincerely and openly; they consider contempt for life a virtue and the slightest symptom of fear as the greatest of faults; therefore they are daringly courageous."

The Ingush are considered very ancient inhabitants of the Caucasus; but their origin is lost in obscure and even contradictory traditions. They have long been supposed to be identical with the Tchetchen – an error which has recently been disproved by anthropological inquiries, which have shown that they are a distinct ethnical group of men. ... The complexion of the Ingush is swarthy; he is tall and slight in form; restless, always on the alert, inquisitive, dexterous, and usually highly intelligent. In every respect the Ingush prove to be, anthropologically, a group of men inhabiting the Caucasus, distinct from their neighbors, the Ossetians, Tchetchens, Lesghins, Kumykhs, Circassians and Kabardins, Armenians, Georgians, Hebrews and others.

— Victor Dingelstedt, Anthropological investigations in the Alps and the Caucasus. Scottish Geographical Magazine. Vol. XVII. Edinburgh, 1901.

According to anthropologist Ivan Pantyukhov, anthropologically the Ingush differ not only from other populations of the Caucasus; but also from the neighbouring Chechens with whom they form a single speech community, due to passive bilingualism practiced by the Ingush people. The Soviet-Russian anthropologists and scientists N.Y. Marr, V.V. Bounak, R.M. Munchaev, I.M Dyakonov, E.I. Krupnov and G.A. Melikashvilli wrote: "Among Ingush the Caucasian type is preserved better than among any other North Caucasian nation". Professor G.F. Debets recognized that Ingush Caucasian anthropologic type is the most Caucasian among Caucasians.

Prussian scholar Peter Simon Pallas visited the Caucasus region in the late 18th century and made the following observation of the Ingush people:

There is a people differing entirely from all other inhabitants of the Caucasus, in language as well as in stature, and features of the countenance: the Galgai or Ingush, who refer to themselves as Lamur, meaning "mountaineers". ... Their manner of pronouncing appeared to us, as if their mouths were full of stones. They are an honest and brave set of people, maintaining their independence, and are subject only to their elders, or priests. They are the only nation inhabiting the Caucasus, among whom the shield has been preserved as a part of their accoutrements. These are made of wood, covered with leather, and bound with iron hoops of an oval form. The short knotty pike which forms part of their armor, serves not only as a weapon of defense, but is likewise used for supporting the gun between its forked branched, by fixing the pointed end in the ground, which enabled the sharp-shooter to take a more accurate aim.

— Peter Simon Pallas, Travels Through the Southern Provinces of the Russian Empire, in the Years 1793 and 1794

== Ingush language and grammar ==
The famous Georgian historian and linguist Ivane Javakhishvili proposed to use "Ghalghaï" (Georgian: Ghilghuri or Ghlighvi) as a general name or classification for the Ingush, Chechen and Bats languages, instead of artificially invented terms, such as "Nakh" or "Vainakh":

"Chachnuri" (Chechen) – i.e. "Nakhchouri" (Nakhchoy), "Ingushuri" (Ingush) – i.e. "Kisturi" (Kist) in the North Caucasus, and "Tsovuri" (Tsova) – i.e. "Batsburi" (Batsbi) in Georgia, in the Tushin community, constitute another separate group, which currently does not have its own common distinct name. In ancient times, Greek and Roman geographers called the native inhabitants of the middle and eastern parts of the North Caucasus – "Geli" and "Legi". The name Geli (Gelae) is the equivalent of the modern "Ghalgha", as pronounced in their own language and in the Tushin language; and the equivalent of Legi is the Georgian "Lekebi" (Leks, Avars). In Georgian, the first corresponds to "Ghilghvi" (singular) and "Ghilghvelebi" (plural), which are often found in old Tushin folk poems. And in other regions of Georgia, it is customary to designate them as "Ghlighvi". Since there is no common name for the above three languages, such a name is necessary, therefore, instead of an artificially invented name, it is better to use the (traditional) name that existed in antiquity. It is with this in mind that I choose to present this group of languages – Chachnuri (Chechen), Kisturi (Ingush) and Tsovuri (Tsova, i.e. Batsbi) — under the general name "Ghilghuri" (Ghalghaï)

— I. Javakhishvili, "The initial structure and relationship of the Georgian and Caucasian languages." Tbilisi, 1937. / p. 97

According to the linguist Johanna Nichols, the Ingush language differs from the Chechen, but is placed into the same language group due to the passive bilingualism of the Ingush people. J. Nichols remarks: "To my surprise, Ingush turned out to be the most complex language of my sample, besting even polysynthetic languages like Seneca, Lakhota, and Halkomelem. Ingush is not polysynthetic; its complexity is due to large inventories of elements (phonemes, cases, tenses, etc.), a high degree of inflectional synthesis in the verb, and classification of various types – declension and conjugation classes, agreement genders, overt inherent genders, split verbal lexicon, split alignment, etc. Perhaps this complexity explains why it has taken thirty years to produce this grammar, during most of which time the project has in fact been on or near the front burner ... Ingush and Chechen are distinct languages and not mutually intelligible, but because of widespread passive partial knowledge of standard lowlands Chechen by Ingush they function to some extent as a single speech community."

== Origin of the Ingush population ==
According to Leonti Mroveli, the 11th-century Georgian chronicler, the word Caucasian is derived from the Vainakh ancestor Kavkas. According to Professor George Anchabadze of Ilia State University "The Vainakhs are the ancient natives of the Caucasus. It is noteworthy, that according to the genealogical table drawn up by Leonti Mroveli, the legendary forefather of the Vainakhs was "Kavkas", hence the name Kavkasians, one of the ethnicons met in the ancient Georgian written sources, signifying the ancestors of the Chechens and Ingush. As appears from the above, the Vainakhs, at least by name, are presented as "the most Caucasian people of all the Caucasians" (Caucasus – Kavkas – Kavkasians) in the Georgian historical tradition. In an article from the Science Magazine Bernice Wuethrich states that American linguist Dr. Johanna Nichols has used language to connect modern people of the Caucasus region to the ancient farmers of the Fertile Crescent and that her research suggests that "farmers of the region were proto-Nakh-Daghestanians". Nichols is quoted as stating that "The Nakh–Dagestanian languages are the closest thing we have to a direct continuation of the cultural and linguistic community that gave rise to Western civilization".

== Genetics ==
The Ingush have 89% of J2 Y-DNA which is the highest known frequency in the world and J2 is closely associated with the Fertile Crescent. The mitochondrial DNA of the Ingush differs from other Caucasian populations and the rest of the world. "The Caucasus populations exhibit, on average, less variability than other [World] populations for the eight Alu insertion polymorphisms analyzed here. The average heterozygosity is less than that of any other region of the world, with the exception of Sahul. Within the Caucasus, the Ingush have much lower levels of variability than any of the other populations. The Ingush also showed unusual patterns of mtDNA variation when compared with other Caucasus populations (Nasidze and Stoneking, submitted), which indicates that some feature of the Ingush population history, or of this particular sample of the Ingush, must be responsible for their different patterns of genetic variation at both mtDNA and the Alu insertion loci."

== Social structure ==
One of the outstanding features of the Ingush character can be attributed to democratic individualism, which directly penetrated the entire social life of the Ingush people. Since time immemorial, the Ingush people were a collection of many small, but completely independent democratic clans and communities. Each individual village was independently governed by senior family members and was completely independent from neighboring villages; only in case of great danger were all villages united together for common protection, under the control of all senior members of the united societies. No military virtues or merits could give a person distinguished by them any significant privileges, therefore, among the Ingush people there were no titles at all that would have civil significance and give the official right of influence on fellow tribesmen, like many neighboring Caucasian peoples.

Due to the complex code of conduct and folk customs, even the poorest, ragged Ingush, in relations to a stranger, and especially to a guest, behaves with such tact that would be called aristocratic, in comparison with the simple-minded, unceremonious treatment of the Russian peasant. Feelings of independence and personal dignity are also very outstanding characteristic features of an Ingush in his relations with foreigners. The sanguine temperament of the Ingush also greatly contribute to the fact that its characteristic features sometimes manifest themselves in the most dramatic form: for example, in the past, feelings of predation and humanity often went hand in hand and resulted in the most opposite actions: an Ingush, who considered it his sacred duty to kill his enemy, would defend the latter with his life if that enemy happened to be a guest in his house.

— Chakh Akhriev, "Ethnographic sketch of the Ingush people" («Терские Ведомости» No. 31–35, 1872)

== Architecture ==
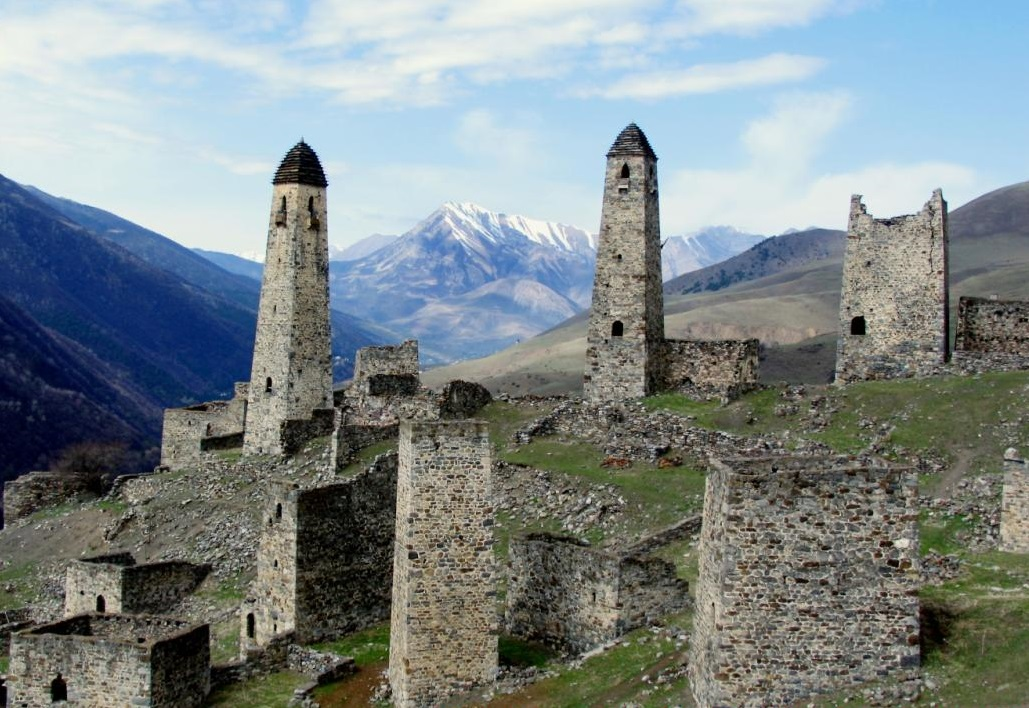
Medieval Ingush village Erzi

The Ingush stone architecture is closely related to their way of life in the mountains. The stone architecture is known to mountain Ingushetia as early as 8,000–4,000 BC cyclopean masonry settlements Egikal, Targim, Doshkhakle, Leymi. Caucasologist Ruslan Buzurtanov mentions that every Ingush family had an architectural triad: a tower, a church, and a necropolis. All three were present in every settlement. All three evolved continuously over time. For example, the Tkhaba-Yerdy Church was originally a pagan temple according to the evidence the earliest structures that dates back before the 8th–9th centuries when it was remodeled into a Christian church adding Christian crosses and reliefs but keeping the pagan petroglyphs. The Ingush stone town consisting of towers and churches were located lower than the necropolis town of the dead. Ingush necropolis had stepped roof either pyramidal or conical shape. Combat towers had stepped pyramidal roof. Necropolis evolved over time: 3,000 BC they were underground stone cists, later grouped into pyramids, then became half underground and finally early Middle Ages above the ground structures. Majority of the Ingush stone necropolis and churches East of the Terek river were either partially or fully destroyed during the Soviet times especially after Ingush people were exiled en masse in 1944. The necropolis were looted by Ossetian and Russian colonists who were brought to Ingushetia after 1944. The combat towers had an entrance on the second floor which had a conical roof with a cross made of stones and a keystone which formed the floor of the next level. These conical stone crosses are unique only in the Ingush towers. The combat towers usually had five to six levels. None of the arches of windows in the combat towers had a keystone and were made of a solid blocks of stone. The famous Soviet archaeologist and historian, professor E.I. Krupnov in his book "Medieval Ingushetia" described the Ingush towers as «in the true sense the pinnacle of the architectural and constructional mastery of the ancient population of the region».

== Culture ==
The Ingush possess a varied culture of traditions, legends, epics, tales, songs, proverbs, and sayings. Music, songs and dance are particularly highly regarded. Popular musical instruments include the dachick-pandyr (a kind of balalaika), kekhat pandyr (accordion, generally played by girls), mirz ponder (a three-stringed violin), zurna (a type of oboe), tambourine, and drums.

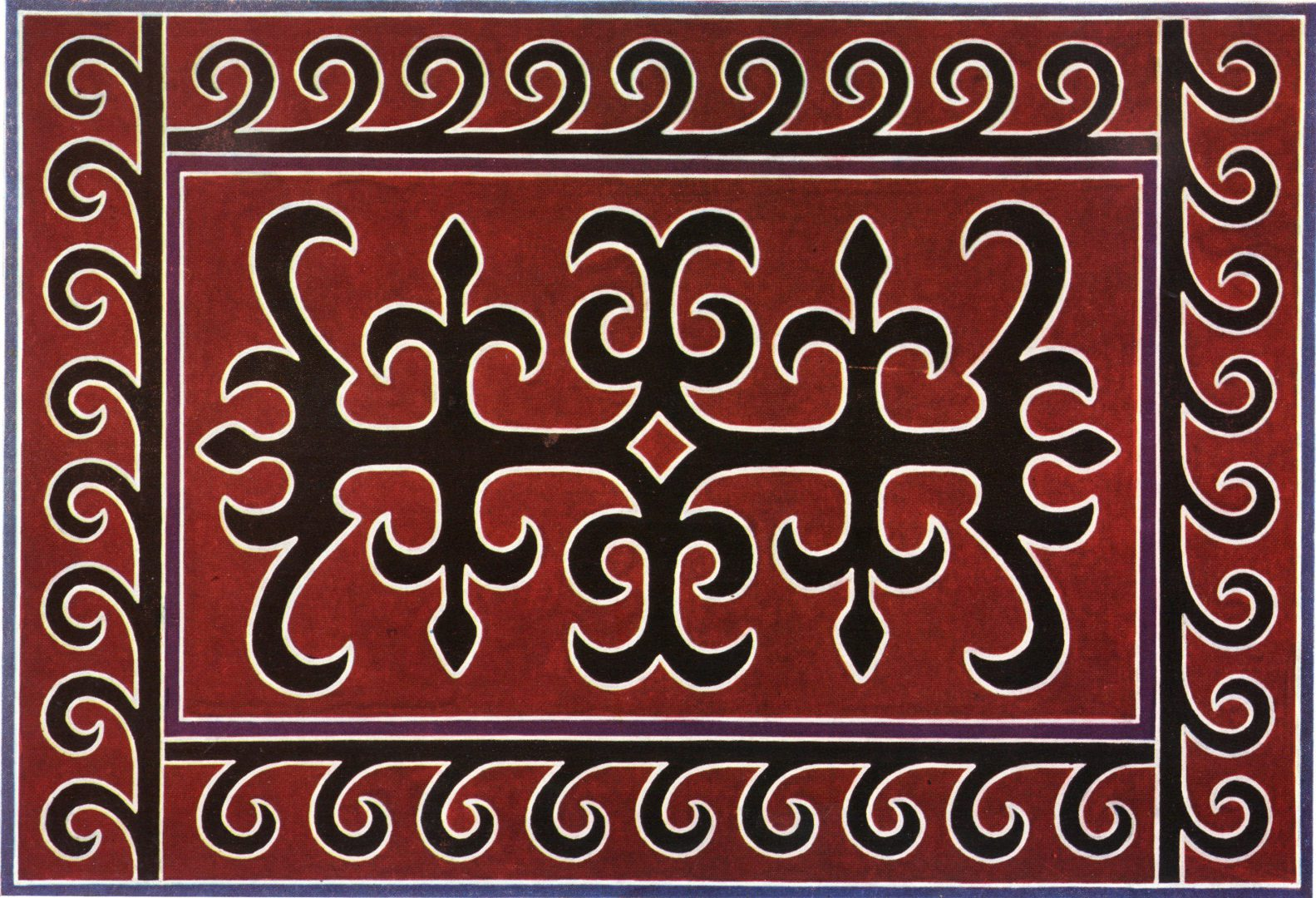
Isting — traditional Ingush felt carpet

Many Ingush burial structures — underground, semi-underground, and especially above-ground multi-tiered stone crypts, used as family mausoleums for centuries, preserved clothing and objects that revealed daily life: brightly colored silk and wool garments, leather footwear, belts, knives, weapons, wooden bowls and cups, combs, mirrors, musical instruments such as the pandyr, and ammunition cases. Women’s culture is especially visible through ornate jewelry and dress, including distinctive eight-lobed temple rings, beads, silver ornaments, and the tall horn-shaped headdress kurkhars, apparently unique to Ingush women. Religious life also left material traces in Christian churches such as Tkhaba-Yerdy, pagan shrines, roadside stelae, and sacred sites, showing a blend of indigenous traditions and Eastern Orthodox Christian influence. Overall, Ingush material culture combined practicality, defense, artistry, and strong clan identity within a harsh mountain environment. Another significant element was isting, the traditional Ingush art of making felt carpets and other wool textiles decorated with symbolic ornaments, historically practiced by women and central to household life, dowries, and cultural identity.

== Religion ==
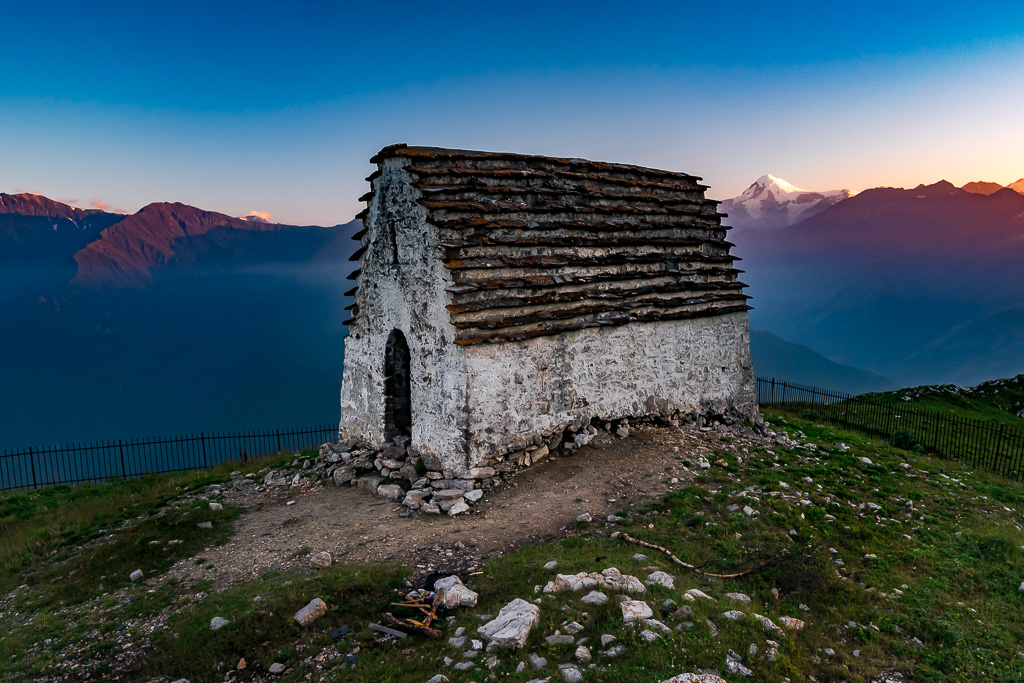
Ancient Ingush temple Myatseli on Mount Myatloam

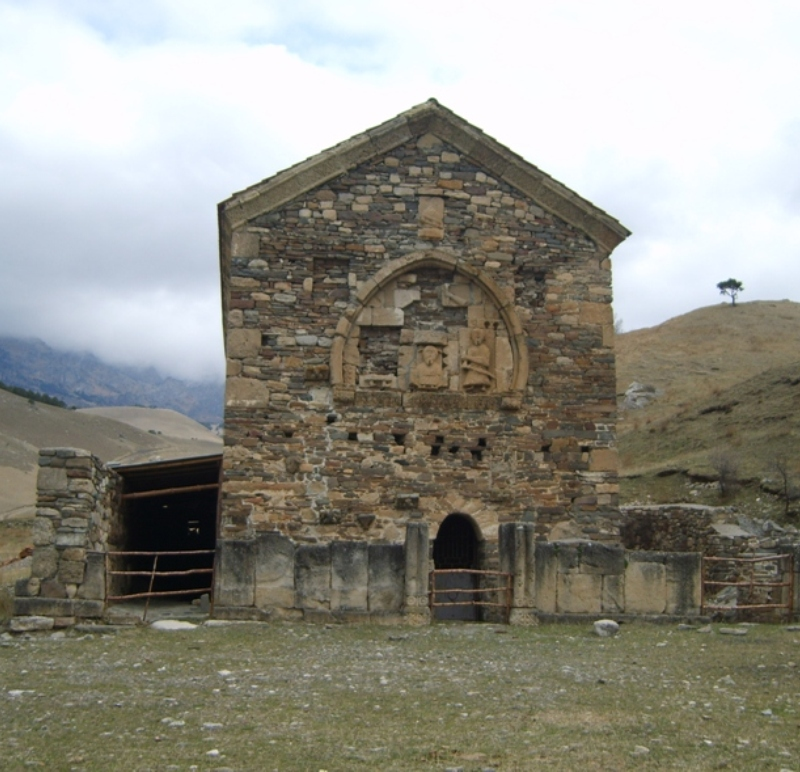
Ingush pre-Islamic beliefs. Temple Tkhabya-Yerd (temple of 2000) was initially a cuboid cyclopean masonry structure, which was rebuilt during the spread of Christianity in Ingushetia. The rebuilt wall was done with smaller stones shown at the entrance side.

The Ingush are Sunni Muslims. In matters of fiqh, they adhere to the school of Imam Muhammad ash-Shafi’i, the founder of the Shafi'i madhab. They are also adherents of two Sufi tariqas: Qadiriyya and Naqshbandiya. Before the final consolidation of Islam, the Ingush from ancient times had their traditional pagan beliefs widespread, with their own unique pantheon, developed mythology and numerous religious architectural objects. At some period, Christianity was also widespread.

=== Christianity ===
According to the writings of the historian Bashir Dalgat, the first Christian missionaries were Georgian and they appeared in Ingushetia around the 10th century, simultaneously with the flourishing of Georgia. Christianity spread quite widely in Ingushetia and Chechnya, at the moment, on the territory of modern Chechnya, Ingushetia and North Ossetia, there are many archaeological, historical and architectural monuments confirming the centuries-old Christianity among the Ingush in particular, and the Vainakhs in general. The scientist's study describes numerous testimonies of historians and travelers of the early and middle Middle Ages, according to which churches or even, possibly, a monastery were built on the territory of the Ingush lands. In particular, according to the testimonies of Russian German scientists Johann Güldenstädt and Peter Simon Pallas, who visited Ingushetia in the 18th century, in the Tkhaba-Yerdy Church (an example of architecture of the 9th–10th centuries) ancient documents were kept, written, according to them the interlocutor-monk, "in gold, blue and black letters", that above the doors of the temple there is an inscription in "Gothic letters". Brockhaus and Efron Encyclopedic Dictionary, published in the late 19th – early 20th centuries, indicated the presence of Christians and pagans among the Ingush:

The Ingush are mostly Sunni Muslims, but there are both Christians and perfect pagans among them. Islam settled in them no earlier than half of the last century, but in ancient times the Ingush were Christians, as evidenced by many chapels and the remains of ancient churches, which are highly respected by the Ingush and in which they make sacrifices, celebrate various festivities, which are a mixture of Christian traditions and pagan outlook. The Ingush have special reverence for human skeletons located in a stone booth near the site of Nazran; according to legend, these skeletons belong to the Nart people, who once lived near Nazran, and remained incorruptible for 200 years, but with the advent of the Russians they began to deteriorate.

=== Islam ===
Islam began to penetrate to the ancestors of the Ingush as early as the 8th century as a result of military campaigns of the Arabs against the Khazars and Alans, which ran through the Darial and Derbent gorges. This period includes a bronze figure of an eagle ("The Eagle of Suleyman") from the tower settlement of Erzi in the Kistin Gorge of mountainous Ingushetia, which probably came here in the form of a military trophy and today is the oldest accurately dated bronze product of Islamic art. The eagle served as the coat of arms of the village of Erzi (from the Ingush. "Eagle") and was passed from generation to generation to the eldest family member. And the name of the village of Dzheyrakh in mountainous Ingushetia is associated with the name of the Arab commander Jarrah ibn-Abdullah. Also, the legends of the Ingush connect the spread of Islam among them with another Arab commander named Abu Muslim.

Some researchers tend to associate the penetration of Islam with the presence of the Mongol-Tatars in the flat regions of Ingushetia, especially with the coming to power of Khan Uzbek (r. 1312–1340), when Islamization began to be carried out more intensively. V. B. Vinogradov believed that the headquarters of Khan Uzbek was located in the area of the modern Ingush village of Plievo, the city of Karabulak and the mausoleum of Borga-Kash. This unique architectural monument was built in 1405–1406. There is an opinion that here may be buried the ruler Burakan (Borokhan), mentioned in the chronicles "Zafar-name" ("Book of Victories") Nizam-ad-din Shami, who was a contemporary and personal secretary of Tamerlan, and "Zafar-name" ("Book of Victories") Sheref-ad-din Yazdi, who lived in the first half of the 15th century.

According to other sources, the flat Ingush, unlike the Ingush highlanders, begin to accept Islam in the 16th century, and the period of its wide distribution falls on the 18th century. According to the Georgian geographer and historian Prince Vakhushti of Kartli, at the beginning of the 18th century. Part of the Ingush, namely the Angusht society, were Sunni Muslims. The presence of ancient mosques of the 18th to 19th centuries. recorded in mountainous Ingushetia.

In the first half of the 19th century, the activities of Imam Shamil played a significant role in rooting Islam among the Ingush. During the Caucasian War, his Naqshbandi tariqa became the official ideology of the Imamate, so that some Ingush societies – Karabulaks, Galashians – became followers of the Imam's teachings.

== See also ==
- List of Ingush people
- Ingushetia

== Bibliography ==
=== English sources ===
- Anchabadze, George (2001). Vainakhs (The Chechen and Ingush). Tbilisi: Caucasian House. pp. 1–76.
- Cohen, S. B., ed. (2008). The Columbia Gazetteer of the World. Vol. 1: A to G (2nd ed.). New York City: Columbia University Press. pp. 1–4390. ISBN 978-0-231-14554-1.
- "Ingush". collinsdictionary.com.
- "Ingush". dictionary.com.
- Mayor, Adrienne (2016). The Amazons: Lives and Legends of Warrior Women across the Ancient World. Princeton: Princeton University Press. pp. 1–544. ISBN 978-0691170275.
- "Ingush". merriam-webster.com.
- "Country: Uzbekistan". Joshua Project.
- "Ingush in Kazakhstan". Joshua Project.
- Nichols, Johanna (1997). The Ingush (with notes on the Chechen). University of California, Berkeley. Archived from the original on 2006-12-08.
- Nichols, Johanna; Sprouse, Ronald L. (2004). Ghalghaai-Ingalsii, Ingalsii-Ghalghaai Lughat [Ingush-English and English-Ingush Dictionary] (in English and Ingush). London: RoutledgeCurzon. pp. 1–563. ISBN 9780415315951.
- "Ingush, n.". Oxford English Dictionary. 1976.
- Phillips, Sir Richard (1826). A Geographical View of the World: Embracing the Manners, Customs, and Pursuits, of Every Nation : Founded on the Best Authorities. New York: E. Hopkins and W. Reed. pp. 1–452.
- Spencer, Edmund (1838). Travels in the Western Caucasus: Including a Tour Through Imeritia, Mingrelia, Turkey, Moldavia, Galicia, Silesia, and Moravia, in 1836. Vol. 1. London: Henry Colburn. pp. 1–374.
- Wahl, O. W. (1875). The Land of the Czar. London: Chapman and Hall. pp. 1–417.

=== French sources ===
- Cauvet, Gaston (1924). "Les Origines Caucasiennes de Touaregs". Bulletin de la Société de géographie d'Alger et de l'Afrique du Nord (in French). Vol. 25. Alger: Imprimerie Charles Zamith & Cie. pp. 1–610.

=== German sources ===
- Klaproth, Heinrich Julius (1814). Geographisch-historische Beschreibung des östlichen Kaukasus, zwischen den Flüssen Terek, Aragwi, Kur und dem Kaspischen Meere [Geographical-historical description of the Eastern Caucasus, between the rivers Terek, Aragvi, Kur and the Caspian Sea] (in German). Vol. 50: Part 2. Weimar: Verlag des Landes-Industrie-Comptoirs. pp. 1–218.
- Koch, Karl (1843). Reise durch Russland nach dem kankasischen Isthmus in den Jahern 1836, 1837 und 1838 [Journey through Russia to the Caucasian Isthmus in the years 1836, 1837 and 1838] (in German). Vol. 2. Stuttgart und Tübingen: Druck und Verlag der J. G. Cotta'sche Buchhandlung. pp. 1–559.
- Pallas, Peter Simon (1811). Second voyage de Pallas, ou, Voyages entrepris dans les gouvernemens méridionaux de l'empire de Russie pendant les années 1793 et 1794 [Second Journey of Pallas, or, Journeys undertaken in governments of the Russian Empire during the years 1793 and 1794] (in French). Vol. 2. Paris: chez Guillaume. pp. 1–387.

=== Georgian sources ===
- ჯავახიშვილი, ივანე (1937). ქართული ერის ისტორიის შესავალი [Introduction to the history of the Georgian nation] (PDF) (in Georgian). Vol. 2: ქართული და კავკასიური ენების თავდაპირველი ბუნება და ნათესაობა. თბილისი: სსრკ მეცნიერებათა აკადემია - საქართველოს ფილიალი. pp. 1–754.

=== Polish sources ===
- Sobczyński, Marek; Heffner, Krystian, eds. (2009). Historical Regions Divided by the Borders: Cultural heritage and multicultural cities. Vol. 2. Łódź: University of Łódź, Department of Political Geography and Regional Studies. pp. 1–291. ISBN 978-8371262524.

=== Russian sources ===
- Албогачиева, М. С.-Г. (2017). Ислам в Ингушетии: этнография и историко-культурные аспекты [Islam in Ingushetia: ethnography and historical and cultural aspects] (in Russian). СПб: Российская академия наук; Музей антропологии и этнографии им. Петра Великого (Кунсткамера). pp. 1–264. ISBN 978-5-88431-349-1.
- Арсеньева, К. К.; Петрушевскій, О. О.; Бекетов, А. Н.; Венгеров, С. А.; Воейков, А. И.; Карѣева, Н. И.; Менделѣева, Д. И.; Собичевскій, В. Т.; Соловьев, В. С.; Соловьев, Н. О., eds. (1894). "Ингуши" [The Ingush]. Энциклопедическій словарь Брокгауза и Ефрона (in Russian). Vol. 13: Имидоэфиры — Историческая школа. С.-Петербургъ: Семеновская Типолитографія (И.А. Ефрона). pp. 58–60 – via Wikisource.
- Багратиони, Вахушти (1904). География Грузии [Geography of Georgia] (in Russian). Translated by Джананашвили, М. Г. Тифлис: Тип. К.П. Козловского. pp. 1–290.
- Бердзенешвили, Н. А.; Дондуа, В. Д.; Думбадзе, М. К.; Меликишвили, Г. А.; Месхиа, Ш. А. (1962). История Грузии: с древнейших времён до 60-х годов XIX века [History of Georgia: from ancient times to the 1860s] (in Russian). Тбилиси: Издательство учебно-педагогической литературы. pp. 1–254.
- Берже, А. П., ed. (1881). Акты, собранные Кавказской археографической комиссіею [Acts collected by the Caucasian Archaeographic Commission] (in Russian). Vol. 8. Тифлисъ: Типографія Главнаго Управленія Намѣстника Кавказскаго. pp. 1–1033.
- Бларамберг, И. Ф. (2010). Историческое, топографическое, статистическое, этнографическое и военное описание Кавказа [Historical, topographical, statistical, ethnographic and military description of the Caucasus] (field research) (in Russian). Translated by Назарова, И. М. Москва: Издательство Надыршин. pp. 1–402. ISBN 978-5-902744-10-8.
- Богуславский, В. В. (2004). Славянская энциклопедия: XVII век [Slavic Encyclopedia: XVII century] (in Russian). Vol. 1. Москва: Олма-Пресс. pp. 1–782. ISBN 5224036593.
- Броневскій, С. М. (1823). "Кисты (глава третья)" [Kists (chapter three)]. Новейшие географические и исторические известия о Кавказе (часть вторая) [The latest geographical and historical news about the Caucasus (part two)] (PDF) (in Russian). Москва: Тип. С. Селивановского. pp. 151–186.
- Бутков, П. Г. (1837). "Мнение о книге: Славянския древности" [Opinion about the book: Slavic antiquities]. Три древние договора руссов с норвежцами и шведами [Three ancient treaties of the Russians with the Norwegians and the Swedes] (in Russian). Санкт-Петербург: Тип. Министерства внутренних дел. pp. 1–66 (311–378 as PDF).
- Бутков, П. Г. (1869). Матеріалы для новой истории, съ 1722 по 1803 годъ [Materials for the new history of the Caucasus, from 1722 to 1803] (in Russian). Vol. 2. СПб.: Типографія Императорской Академіи Наукъ. pp. 1–602.
- Великая, Н. Н. (2010). "Этногенез и этническая история" [Ethnogenesis and ethnic history]. Северный Кавказ с древних времён до начала XX столетия (историко-этнографические очерки) [North Caucasus from ancient times to the beginning of the 20th century (historical and ethnographic essays)] (in Russian). Пятигорск: n.a.
- Виноградов, В. Б. (1980). Время, горы, люди [Time, mountains, people] (in Russian). Грозный: Чечено-Ингушское кн. изд-во. pp. 1–168.
- Волкова, Н. Г. (1973). Этнонимы и племенные названия Северного Кавказа [Ethnonyms and tribal names of the North Caucasus] (in Russian). Москва: Наука. pp. 1–210.
- Галгай (1924). "О Галгаях" [About the Galgais]. Кавказский Горец (in Russian) (1). Прага: Издание Союза горцев Кавказа в ЧСР: 49–51.
- Генко, А. Н. (1930). "Из культурного прошлого ингушей" [From the cultural past of the Ingush]. Записки коллегии востоковедов при Азиатском музее [Notes of the College of Orientalists at the Asian Museum] (in Russian). Vol. 5. Ленинград: Издательство Академии наук СССР. pp. 681–761.
- Гумба, Г. Д. (1988). Расселение Вайнахских племён по "Ашхарацуйцу". "Армянская География" VII века [Settlement of the Vainakh tribes along the "Ashkharatsuytsu". "Armenian Geography" of the 7th century] (in Russian). Ереван: n.a. pp. 1–.
- Гумба, Г. Д. (1990). "Об одном общенахском этнониме второй половины первого тыс. до н. э." [About one common Nakh ethnonym of the second half of the first millennium BCE]. Актуальные проблемы истории дореволюционной Чечено-Ингушетии [Actual problems of the history of pre-revolutionary Checheno-Ingushetia] (in Russian). Грозный: n.a.
- Гюльденштедт, Иоганн Антон (2002). Карпов, Ю. Ю. (ed.). Путешествие по Кавказу в 1770–1773 гг. [Journey through the Caucasus in 1770–1773.] (in Russian). Translated by Шафроновской, Т. К. Санкт-Петербург: Петербургское Востоковедение. pp. 1–508. ISBN 5-85803-213-3.
- Дагестанский филиал АН СССР (1989). Народно-освободительное движение горцев Дагестана и Чечни в 20-50-х годах XIX в: Всесоюзная научная конференция, 20-22 июня 1989 г.: тезисы докладов и сообщений [The people's liberation movement of the highlanders of Dagestan and Chechnya in the 1820s–1850s: All-Union Scientific Conference, June 20–22, 1989: abstracts of reports and messages]. Makhachkala: Дагестанский филиал АН СССР. pp. 1–190.
- Далгат, Б. К. (2004). "Христианство и магометанство в Чечне. Распространение христианства и магометанства среди ингушей" [Christianity and Mohammedanism in Chechnya. The spread of Christianity and Mohammedanism among the Ingush]. In Арутюнов, С. А. (ed.). Первобытная религия чеченцев и ингушей [The primitive religion of the Chechens and Ingush] (1st ed.). Москва: Наука. pp. 38–52. ISBN 5020098353. Archived from the original on 2012-01-28.
- Дахкильгов, И. А. (2007). Боль и гордость моя – родная Ингушетия [My pain and pride is my native Ingushetia] (in Russian). Нальчик: ГП КБР "Респ. полиграфкомбинат им. Революции 1905 г.", Эль-Фа.
- Долгиева, М. Б.; Картоев, М. М.; Кодзоев, Н. Д.; Матиев, Т. Х. (2013). История Ингушетии [History of Ingushetia] (4th ed.). Ростов-на-Дону: Южный издательский дом. pp. 1–600. ISBN 978-5-98864-056-1.
- Джанашвили, М. Г. (1897). Известия грузинских летописей и историков о Северном Кавказе и России [Bulletin of Georgian chronicles and historians about the North Caucasus and Russia] (in Russian). Тифлис: Типография К.П. Козловского. Головинский пр.. No. 12. pp. 1–209.
- Зенькович, Н. А. (2005). Тайны ушедшего века. Границы. Споры. Обиды [Secrets of the bygone age. Borders. Disputes. Grievances] (in Russian). Москва: Олма-Пресс. pp. 1–766. ISBN 5-224-04403-0.
- Зиссерман, А. Л. (1879). Двадцать пять лет на Кавказе (1842-1867) [Twenty-five years in the Caucasus (1842-1867)] (in Russian). Vol. 1: 1842-1851. Санкт-Петербург: Типографія А. С. Суворина. pp. 1–432.
- Зиссерман, А. Л. (1889). Бартенев, П. И. (ed.). "Фельдмаршалъ князь А. И. Барятинскій: Глава IV | Русскій архивъ" [Field Marshal knyaz A. I. Baryarsinsky | Russian Archive] (PDF). Русскій архивъ (in Russian). No. 2. Moscow: Университетская типографія. pp. 274–358 (292–376 (PDF).
- Казиев, Ш. М., ed. (1997). Шамиль: Иллюстрированная энциклопедия [Shamil: Illustrated Encyclopedia] (in Russian). Москва: Эхо Кавказа. pp. 1–220. ISBN 5-900054-01-2.
- Кодзоев, Н. Д. (2002). "Основание Назрани" [Foundation of Nazran] ( (chapter)). История Ингушского народа [The History of the Ingush people] (in Russian). Archived from the original on 2019-07-23 – via www.old.memo.ru.
- Кодзоев, Н. Д. (2020a). О 'добровольном вхождении' Ингушетии в состав Российской империи [On the 'voluntary entry' of Ingushetia into the Russian Empire] (in Russian). Назрань: Кеп. pp. 1–64.
- Кодзоев, Н. Д. (2020b). Ингушские населённые пункты: Ангушт [Ingush settlements: Angusht] (in Russian). Назрань: Кеп. pp. 1–64. ISBN 978-5-4482-0066-3.
- Крупнов, Е. И. (1971). Средневековая Ингушетия [Medieval Ingushetia] (in Russian). Москва: Наука. pp. 1–211.
- Кушева, Е. Н. (1963). Народы Северного Кавказа и их связи с Россией (вторая половина XVI — 30-е годы XVII века) [The peoples of the North Caucasus and their relations with Russia (the second half of the 16th – 30s of the 17th century)] (in Russian). Москва: Издательство Академии наук СССР. pp. 1–370.
- Латышев, В. В. (1947). "Известия древних писателей о Скифии и Кавказе" [News of ancient writers about Scythia and the Caucasus]. Вестник древней истории (in Russian) (4). Москва-Ленинград: Издательство Академии Наук СССР: 230–348.
- Мровели, Леонти (1979). Мамулиа, Г. С. (ed.). Жизнь картлийских царей. Извлечение сведений об абхазах, народах Северного Кавказа и Дагестана [Life of Kartvelian kings. Extraction of information about the Abkhazians, the peoples of the North Caucasus and Dagestan] (in Russian). Москва: Наука. pp. 1–106.
- Мунчаев, Р. М. (1994). "Куро-аракская культура" [Kuro-Araxes Culture]. In Кушнарева, К. Х.; Марковин, В. И. (eds.). Археология. Эпоха бронзы Кавказа и Средней Азии. Ранняя и средняя бронза Кавказа [Archeology. The Bronze Age of the Caucasus and Central Asia. Early and Middle Bronze Age of the Caucasus]. (Археология с древнейших времён до средневековья в 20 томах / акад. Б. А. Рыбаков) (in Russian). Москва: Наука. pp. 8–57. ISBN 5-02-009723-3.
- Национальная академия наук Грузии, ed. (2008). Картлис Цховреба (История Грузии) [The Georgian Chronicles] (in Russian). Тбилиси: Артануджи. pp. 1–455.
- Пиотровский, Б. Б.; Нарочницкий, А. Л., eds. (1988). История народов Северного Кавказа с древнейших времён до конца XVIII в. [The history of the peoples of the North Caucasus from ancient times to the end of the 18th century] (in Russian). Москва: Наука. pp. 1–554. ISBN 5-02-009486-2.
- Поспелов, Е. М. (2008). Географические названия России. Топонимический словарь [Geographical names of Russia. Toponymic Dictionary] (in Russian). Москва: АСТ, Астрель. pp. 1–523. ISBN 978-5-17-054966-5.
- Потто, В. А., ed. (1904). Утвержденіе русскаго владычества на Кавказѣ. Vol. 3: Part 1. Тифлис: Типографія штаба Кавказскаго военного округа. pp. 1–527.
- Ракович, Д. В. (1911). Прошлое Владикавказа. Краткая историческая справка ко дню пятидесятилетнего юбилея города. 1861 г. [The past of Vladikavkaz. Brief historical background to the fiftieth anniversary of the city. 1861] (in Russian) (3rd ed.). Владикавказ: Электропеч. Р. Сегаль и С-вья. pp. 3–28.
- Ржевускій, А. (1888). Терцы. Сборникъ исторических, бытовыхъ и географическо-статистическихъ свѣдѣній о Терскомъ казачьем войскѣ [Tertsy. Collection of historical, everyday, geographical-statistical information about the Terek Cossacks army] (in Russian). Владикавказъ: Типографія Областнаго Правленiя Терской Области. pp. 1–292.
- Робакидзе, А. И., ed. (1968). Кавказский этнографический сборник. Очерки этнографии Горной Ингушетии [Caucasian ethnographic collection. Essays on the ethnography of Mountainous Ingushetia] (in Russian). Vol. 2. Тбилиси: Мецниереба. pp. 1–333.
- Севрюкова, Е. (2019). Севрюкова, Е. (ed.). "Связанные родством" [Related by kinship] (PDF). Наши Лица (in Russian). Москва: Партнер Плюс: 1–259.
- Степанова, А. (2018-10-03). ""Люди башен": Как живут ингуши" ["People of the towers": How the Ingush live]. Узнай Россию (in Russian).
- "Владикавказъ" [Vladikavkaz]. Терскія вѣдомости (in Russian). No. 71. Владикавказъ. 31 March 1911.
- "Торжество празднованія 50-летия основанія г. Владикавказа" [The celebration of the 50th anniversary of the founding of the city of Vladikavkaz]. Терскія вѣдомости (in Russian). No. 75. Владикавказъ. 5 April 1911.
- Терскій областной статистическій комитет (1895). Вертепов, Г. А. (ed.). Терскій календарь. Вып. 5 [Tersky Calendar] (in Russian). Владикавказъ: Типографія Терскаго областнаго правленія. pp. 1–426.
- Хауг, В. (2005). "Демографические тенденции, формирование наций и межэтнические отношения в Киргизии". Демоскоп.
- Чикобава, А. С. (2010). Введение в иберийско-кавказское языкознание [Introduction to Iberian-Caucasian Linguistics] (in Russian). Тбилиси: Тбилисский Гос. Университет им. И. Джаважишвили. Изд. «Универсал».
- Шнирельман, Виктор (April 22, 2020). "Быть аланами" [To be Alans]. Это Кавказ (Interview) (in Russian). Interviewed by Лиза Али. Archived from the original on 2022-01-26.
- Штедер, Л. Л. (1996). Аталиков, В. М. (ed.). Дневник путешествия в 1781 году от пограничной крепости Моздок во внутренние области Кавказа [Diary of a journey in 1781 from the border fortress of Mozdok to the interior regions of the Caucasus] (in Russian). Нальчик: Наша старина.
- Яновский, А. О. (1846). "Древней Кавказской Албании" [Ancient Caucasian Albania]. Журнал Министерства народного просвещения [Journal of the Ministry of Public Education] (in Russian). Vol. 52. СПб.: Тип. Императорской Академии Наук. pp. 97–136 (163–227 as PDF).
