= Ethnonyms of the Ingush =

Ethnonyms of the Ingush are names of Ingush people, including self-names (endonyms) and names used by other ethnic groups to refer to the Ingush (exonyms) throughout the existence of Ingush people from Middle Ages to the modern day.

== Endonyms ==
Ghalghaï (Ingush: ГIалгIай, [ˈʁəlʁɑj]) is the self-name of the Ingush. Some scholars associate it with the ancient Gargareans and Gelaï mentioned in the 1st century in the work of the ancient historian and geographer Strabo.

Loamaro (Ingush: Лоамаро) — self-name of the Ingush. Loamaro is composition of Loam (Mountain) and -(a)ro suffix, the word literally translates as "Mountaineer" in Ingush language.

== Exonyms ==
Durdzuks (Georgian: დურძუკები, romanized: durdzuk'ebi), also known as Dzurdzuks — medieval ethnonym of Georgian origin for the Nakh peoples. First mention of Durdzuks can be found in the 7th-century work Geography of Armenia by Anania Shirakatsi as the Dourtsk (Armenian: Դուրծկք).

Kistins or Kists (Ingush: кистий, Chechen: кистӀий) — exonym of all Nakh peoples for most of the part, however in some sources, it was used for only the Ingush living in Armkhi Gorge (also called Kistin Gorge).

Gligvi (Georgian: ღლიღვი, romanized: ghlighvi) — medieval ethnonym used in Georgian, Russian and Western European sources in the 16th-19th centuries. The ethnonym corresponds to the self-name of the Ingush - Ghalghaï.

Ghilgho (Georgian: ღილღო) — medieval ethnonym used in Georgian sources, specifically by neighbouring Khevsurs, Pshavis and Tushins to refer to the country of the Ghalghaï, mentioned in the works of the first Tsova-Tushin writer Ivan Tsiskarishvili (Tsiskarov), and famous poets Vazha-Pshavela and Gabriel Jabushanuri.

Erokhan people — ethnonym mentioned in Russian sources of 16-17th centuries. The ethnonym corresponds to the Dzherakh.

Kalkans (also Kolkans, Kalki, Kolki, Kalkan people) — ethnonym of the Ingush used in Russian sources of the 16th-17th centuries. The ethnonym corresponds to the self-name of the Ingush — Ghalghaï.

Ğalğayal — to the Avars. The ethnonym corresponds to the self-name of the Ingush - Ghalghaï.

Ğalğayol — to the Andi people. The ethnonym corresponds to the self-name of the Ingush - Ghalghaï.

Qalghaï — to the Kumyks. The ethnonym corresponds to the self-name of the Ingush - Ghalghaï.

Qulgha — to the Ossetians, refers to the country of the Ingush. The ethnonym corresponds to the self-name of the Ingush - Ghalghaï.

Mæqqæl — to the Ossetians, initially referred to neighbouring Ingush clans who lived in the area of Armkhi. The ethnonym derives from the word 'mækhæl' (guard bird) and is linked to the Ingush village Erzi, which translates as 'eagle'.

Ingush (also Ingushevs, Angushi, Angushtins) — to the Kabardins, adapted by Russians in the 18th century. The ethnonym derives from the medieval village Angusht. The term Mishkhish (Kabardian: Мыщхыш) was also used to refer to the Ingush people.

== Bibliography ==
- Гюльденштедт, Иоганн Антон (2002). "VI. Провинция Кистия, или Кистетия" [VI. Province of Kistia, or Kistetia]. In Карпов, Ю. Ю. (ed.). Путешествие по Кавказу в 1770-1773 гг. [Journey through the Caucasus in 1770-1773] (in Russian). Translated by Шафроновской, Т. К. Санкт-Петербург: Петербургское Востоковедение. pp. 238–243. ISBN 5-85803-213-3.
- Pallas, Peter Simon (1811). Second voyage de Pallas, ou, Voyages entrepris dans les gouvernemens méridionaux de l'empire de Russie pendant les années 1793 et 1794 [Second Journey of Pallas, or, Journeys undertaken in governments of the Russian Empire during the years 1793 and 1794] (in French). Vol. 2. Paris: chez Guillaume. pp. 1–387.
- Klaproth, Heinrich Julius (1814). Geographisch-historische Beschreibung des östlichen Kaukasus, zwischen den Flüssen Terek, Aragwi, Kur und dem Kaspischen Meere [Geographical-historical description of the Eastern Caucasus, between the rivers Terek, Aragvi, Kur and the Caspian Sea] (in German). Vol. 50. Part 2. Weimar: Verlag des Landes-Industrie-Comptoirs. pp. 1–218.
- Броневский, С. М. (1823). "Кисты (глава третья)" [Kists (chapter three)]. Новейшие географические и исторические известия о Кавказе (часть вторая) [The latest geographical and historical news about the Caucasus (part two)] (PDF) (in Russian). Москва: Типография С. Селивановского. pp. 151–186.
- Робакидзе, А. И., ed. (1968). Кавказский этнографический сборник. Очерки этнографии Горной Ингушетии [Caucasian ethnographic collection. Essays on the ethnography of Mountainous Ingushetia] (in Russian). Vol. 2. Тбилиси: Мецниереба. pp. 1–333.
- Латышев, В. В. (1947). "Известия древних писателей о Скифии и Кавказе" [News of ancient writers about Scythia and the Caucasus]. Вестник древней истории [Bulletin of ancient history] (in Russian). Москва-Ленинград: Издательство Академии Наук СССР.
- Крупнов, Е. И. (1971). Средневековая Ингушетия [Medieval Ingushetia] (in Russian). Москва: Наука. pp. 1–211.
- Anchabadze, George (2001). Vainakhs (The Chechen and Ingush). Tbilisi: Caucasian House. pp. 1–76.
- Mayor, Adrienne (2016). The Amazons: Lives and Legends of Warrior Women across the Ancient World. Princeton: Princeton University Press. pp. 1–544. ISBN 978-0-691-17027-5.
- Бутков, П. Г. (1837). "Мнение о книге: Славянския древности" [Opinion about the book: Slavic antiquities]. Три древние договора руссов с норвежцами и шведами [Three ancient treaties of the Russians with the Norwegians and the Swedes] (in Russian). Санкт-Петербург: Типография Министерства внутренних дел. pp. 1–66 (311–378 as PDF).
- Кох, Карл (1842). Путешествие через Россию к Кавказскому перешейку — 1836, 1837, 1838 г. [Journey through Russia to the Caucasian isthmus - 1836, 1837, 1838] (in Russian).
- Яновский, А. О. (1846). "Древней Кавказской Албании" [Ancient Caucasian Albania]. Журнал Министерства народного просвещения [Journal of the Ministry of Public Education] (in Russian). Vol. 52. СПб.: Тип. Императорской Академии Наук. pp. 97–136 (163–227 as PDF).
- Wahl, O. W. (1875). The Land of the Czar. London: Chapman and Hall. pp. 1–417.
- Бларамберг, И. Ф. (2010). Историческое, топографическое, статистическое, этнографическое и военное описание Кавказа [Historical, topographical, statistical, ethnographic and military description of the Caucasus] (in Russian). Translated by Назарова, И. М. Москва: Надыршин. pp. 1–402. ISBN 978-5-902744-10-8.
- Зубов, П. П. (1835). Картина Кавказскаго края, принадлежащаго Россіи и сопредѣльныхъ оному земель в историческомъ, статистическомъ, этнографическомъ, финансовомъ и торговомъ отношеніяхъ [A picture of the Caucasus region belonging to Russia and adjacent lands in historical, statistical, ethnographic, financial and trade relations] (in Russian). Vol. 3. С. Петербургъ: Типографія Конрада Вингебера. pp. 1–272.
- Марр, Н. Я. (1922). Кавказскія племенныя названія и мѣстныя параллели [Caucasian tribal names and local parallels]. Россійская академія наукъ. Труды комиссіи по изученію племенного состава населенія Россіи (in Russian). Петроградъ: Россійская Государственная Академическая Типографія. pp. 1–39.
- Волкова, Н. Г. (1973). Этнонимы и племенные названия Северного Кавказа [Ethnonyms and tribal names of the North Caucasus] (in Russian). Москва: Наука. pp. 1–210.
- Кушева, Е. Н. (1963). Народы Северного Кавказа и их связи с Россией (вторая половина XVI — 30-е годы XVII века) [The peoples of the North Caucasus and their relations with Russia (the second half of the 16th - 30s of the 17th century)] (in Russian). Москва: Издательство Академии наук СССР. pp. 1–370.
- Богуславский, В. В. (2004). Славянская энциклопедия: XVII век [Slavic Encyclopedia: XVII century] (in Russian). Vol. 1. Москва: Олма-Пресс. pp. 1–782. ISBN 5-224-03659-3.
- Далгат, Б. К. (1934). Родовой быт чеченцев и ингушей в прошлом [Tribal life of Chechens and Ingush in the past] (in Russian). Владикавказ: Известия Ингушского Научно-Исследовательского Института.
- Калоев, Б. А. (1999). Осетинские историко-этнографические этюды [Ossetian historical and ethnographic studies] (in Russian). Москва: Российская академия наук. pp. 1–400.
- Генко, А. Н. (1930). "Из культурного прошлого ингушей" [From the cultural past of the Ingush]. Записки коллегии востоковедов при Азиатском музее [Notes of the College of Orientalists at the Asian Museum] (in Russian). Vol. 5. Ленинград: Издательство Академии наук СССР. pp. 681–761.
