= Chamaecoetae =

Ancient tribe during first century AD, mentioned by Strabo

Chamaecoetae (Ancient Greek: χαμαικοῖται) were an ancient tribe mentioned by Greek geographer Strabo in his work Geographica during the first century AD. Some researchers connect them with the Ingush and localize them in mountainous Ingushetia, in Khamkhi, while others question these theories and argue that more arguments are needed.

== Ethnonym and localization ==
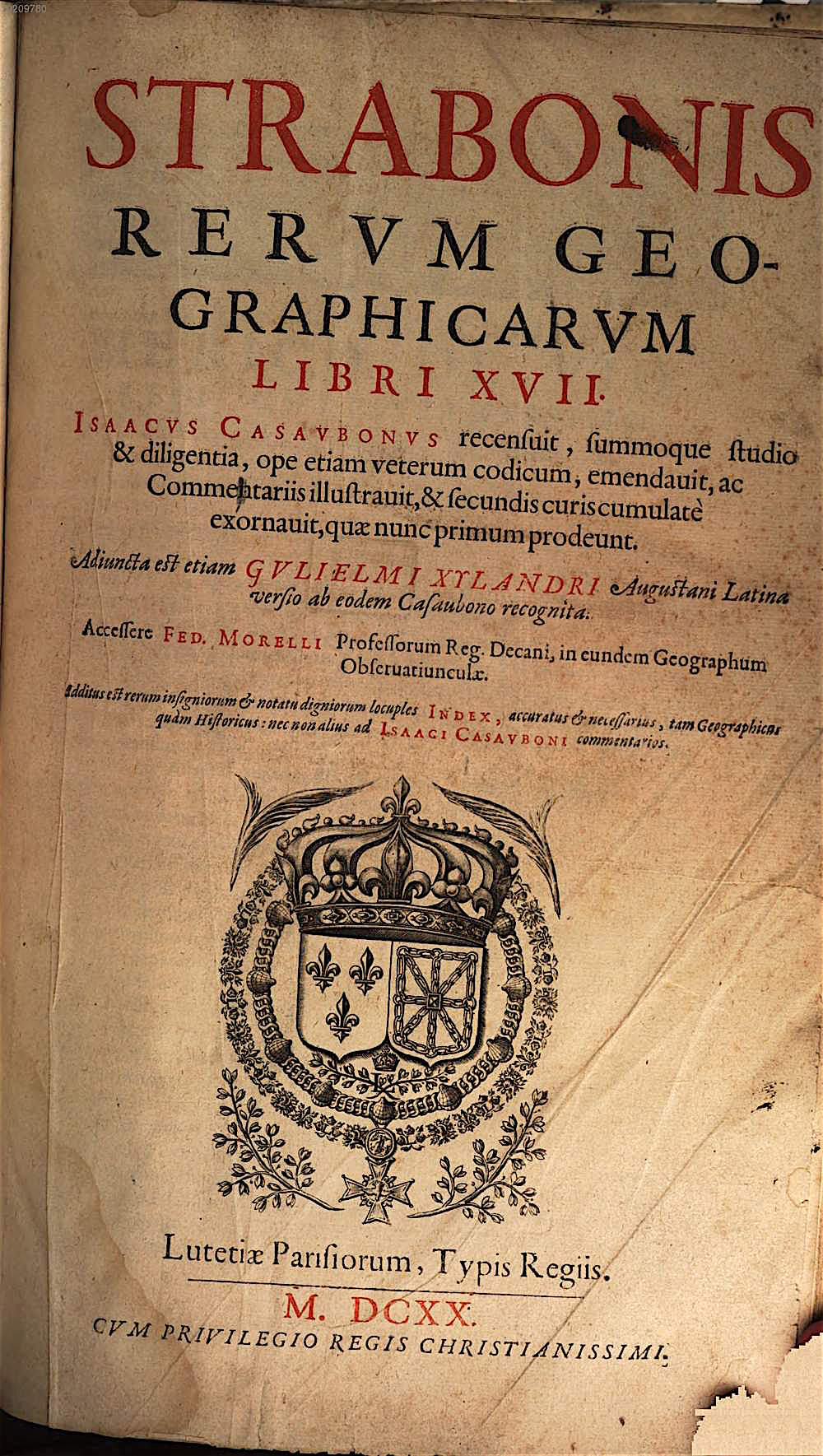
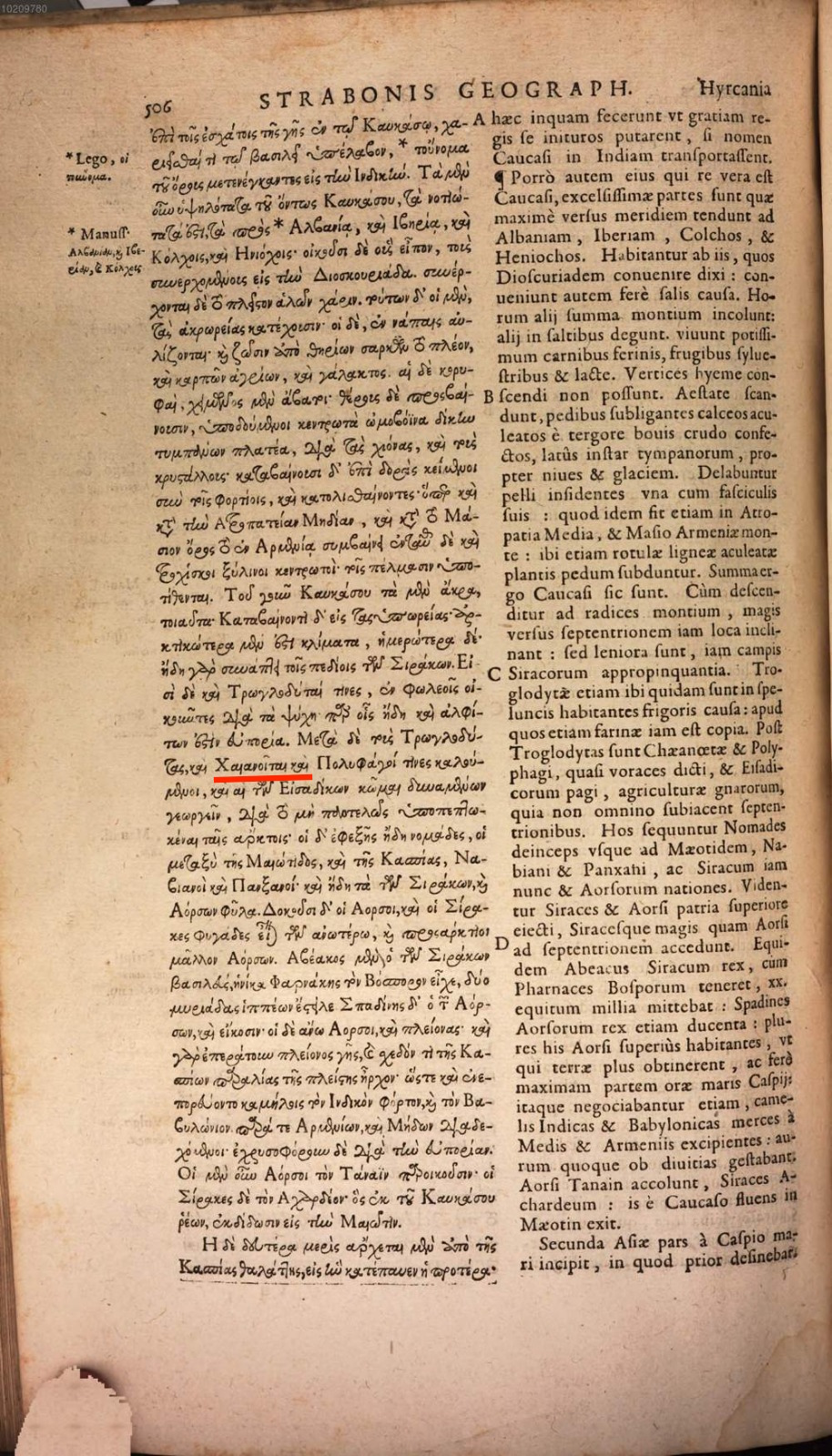
Republished work of Strabo, Geographica, titled "Strabonis rerum geographicarum libri XVII" with French translation on the right side of each page. Chamaecoetae as can be seen on page 506 under the name "χαμαικοῖται". The first and only existing mention of the tribe.

=== First and only mention ===
The first and only mention of the tribe is in work of the Greek geographer Strabo, Geographica. He stated in his work as follows:

"After the Troglodytae one comes to certain Chamaecoetae and Polyphagi, as they are called, and to the villages of the Eisadici, who are able to farm because they are not altogether exposed to the north."

=== Localization ===
For the first time in 1963, V. B. Vinogradov expressed the point of view about the ethnicity of the Chamaecoeta in his work "Sarmatians of the North-Eastern Caucasus" (Сарматы Северо-восточного Кавказа), he associated the ethnonym with the Vainakh tribes. (Note: In his work as well as in the works of Soviet and Russian scholars Chamaecoetae are commonly transliterated in Russian as Khamekets and Khamekits (Хамекеты and Хамекиты). Although in the translated work of the book Geographica of Fëdor Mishenko, Chamaecoetae are instead transliterated in Russian as Khamaykoytes (Хамайкойты).) Further on, he and Z. K. Chokaev again wrote about the connection of this ethnonym with the Ingush and localizaed Chamaecoetae in Khamkhi:

"Another ethnonym, Khamekets, turns out to be comparable with the name of one of the most ancient powerful Ingush taips, eponymous to its center, the mountain village of Khamkhi in the Assinsky Gorge."

E. I. Krupnov first localized the Chamaecoetae in mountainous Chechnya, but later agreed with B. V. Vinogradov and K. Z. Chokaev about the location near the Ingush village of Khamkhi. However, there were scholars like the Caucasologist N. G. Volkova who questioned these theories and argued that:

"(...) despite the great temptation of such comparisons, they require more argumentation."

== See also ==
- Gelae
- Gargareans
- Gelonians
- Legae

== Bibliography ==
- Anchabadze, George (2001). Vainakhs (The Chechen and Ingush). Tbilisi: Caucasian House. pp. 1–76.
- Виноградов, В. Б.; Чокаев, К. 3. (1966). Виноградов, В. Б. (ed.). "Древние свидетельства о названиях и размещении нахских племен" [Ancient evidence of the names and location of the Nakh tribes]. Известия ЧИНИИИЯЛ (in Russian). Vol. 8, no. 1. Грозный: Чечено-Ингушское Книжное Издательство.
- Волкова, Н. Г. (1973). Этнонимы и племенные названия Северного Кавказа [Ethnonyms and tribal names of the North Caucasus] (in Russian). Москва: Наука. pp. 1–210.
- Крупнов, Е. И. (1971). Средневековая Ингушетия [Medieval Ingushetia] (in Russian). Москва: Наука. pp. 1–211.
- Мищенко, Ѳ. Г. (1879). География Страбона в семнадцати книгах [Geography of Strabo in seventeen books] (in Russian). Москва: К. Т. Солдатенков. pp. 1–1177.
- Strabo (1928) [20]. Geography Of Strabo: in 8 volumes (in English and Ancient Greek). Vol. 5. Translated by Jones, H. L. London: W. Heinemann Ltd. pp. 1–541.
