= Tsey-Loam =

Mountain in Ingushetia

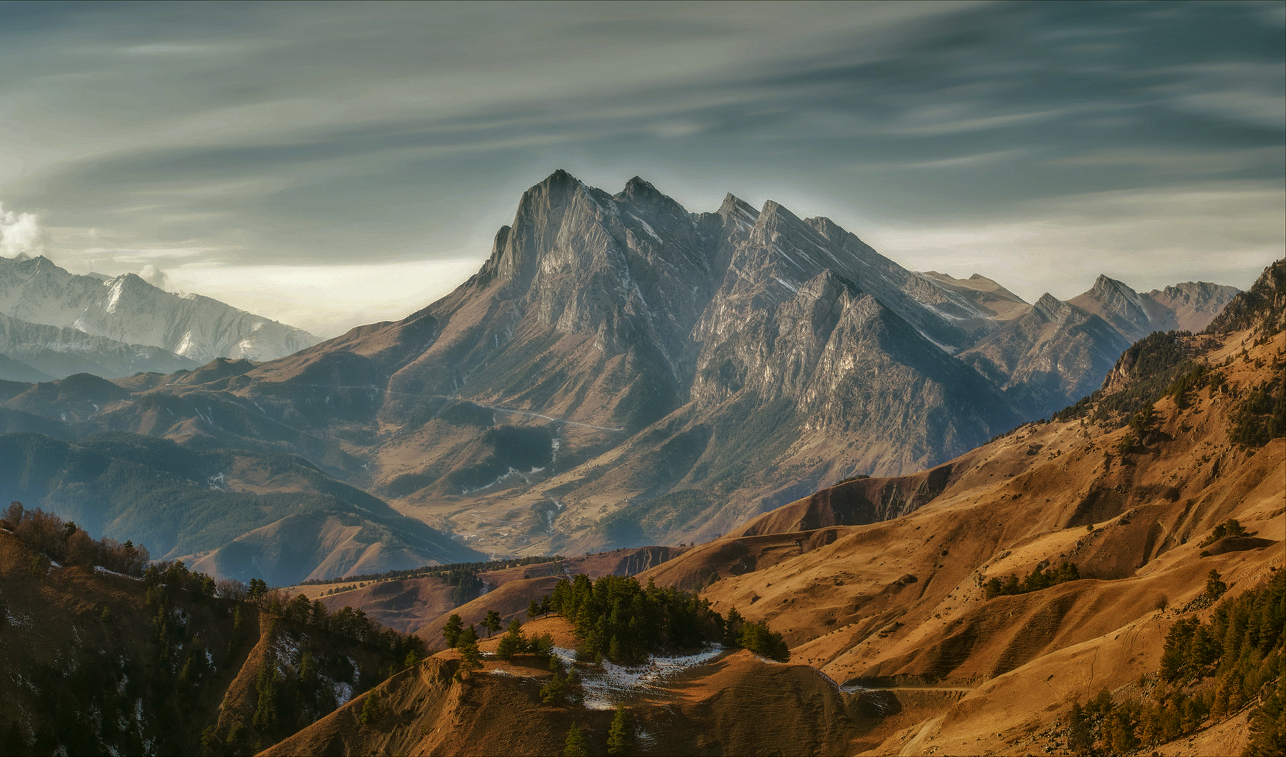
- Mount Tsey-Loam

Highest point
- Elevation: 3,171 m (10,404 ft)
- Coordinates: 42°50′09″N 44°50′57″E

Naming
- Native name: Цӏей-лоам

Geography
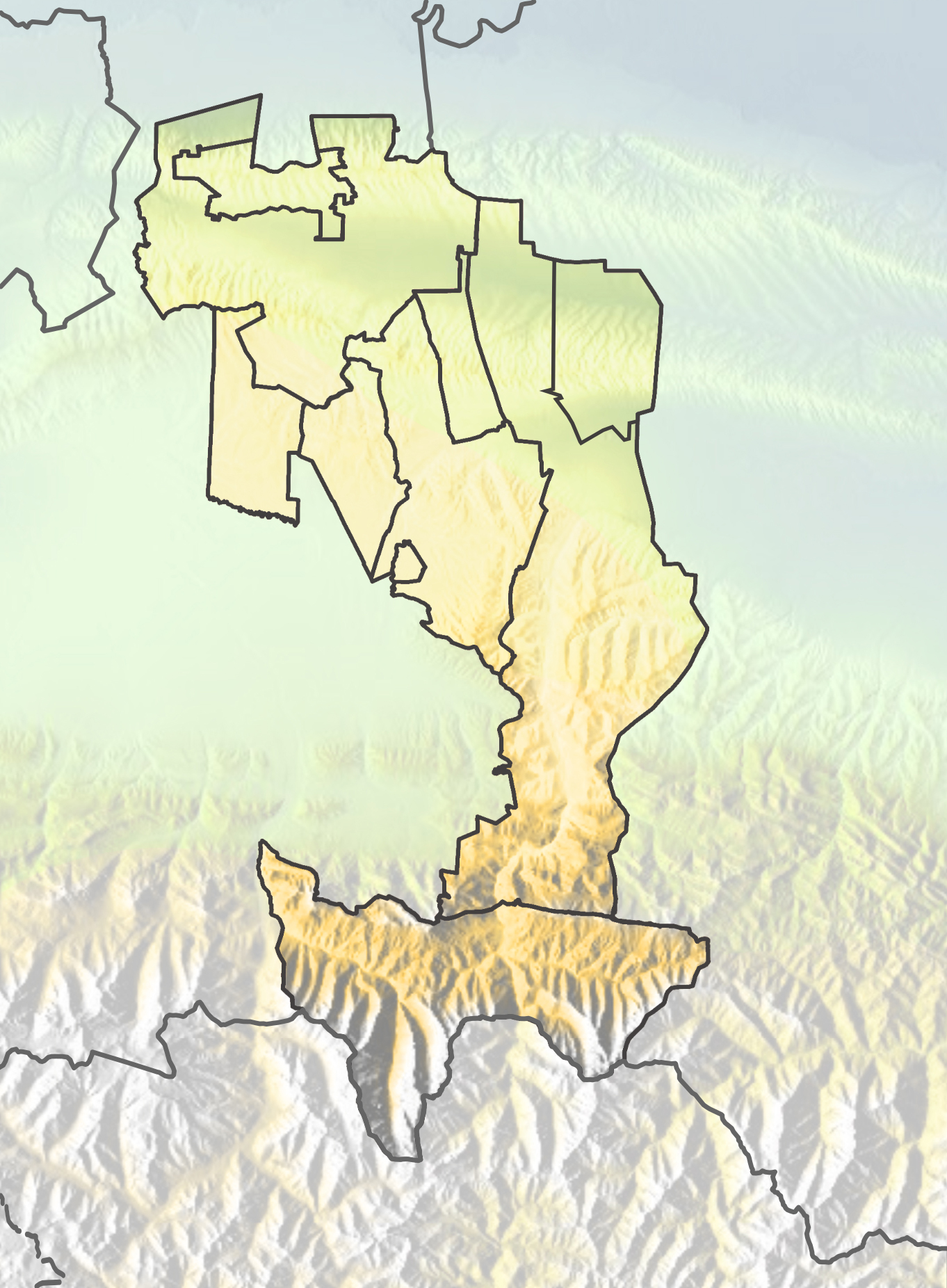
- Location within Caucasus Mountains Location within Republic of Ingushetia
- Location: Ingushetia
- Country: Russia
- Parent range: Skalisty Range, Caucasus

Tsey-Loam (Ingush: Цӏей-Лоам) is a mountain range in the Dzheyrakhsky District of the Republic of Ingushetia. The main peak is Gaikomd (Ingush: КхаькӀоамтӀе (Note: КхаькӀоамтӀе (Qäkoamtē) literally translates from Ingush as "three-tusk", indicating the shape of the mountain peak.), Кхей-КӀоам).

Since 2014, an international base jumping festival is held annually here, where at the foot of the mountain at an altitude of 1842 meters, the base jumping club "Legendy Gor" was opened.

== History ==
Mount Tsey-Loam was considered sacred to the ancient Ingush population. Vakhushti of Kartli, in his description of the country of the medieval Ingush in 1745, calls Tsey-Loam the "Gligvi mountain", stemming from the Georgian form of the Ingush self-name — Ghalghai.

== Geography ==
It is located in the very center of the Dzheyrakhsky District, 3171 meters above sea level. The range connects mountains Dzhar-Loam, Kuley-Loam, Leymoy-Loam and Pane. The medieval sanctuary Dyalite is situated on top of the mountain. The villages Keli, Leymi, Kog, Kart, Doshkhakle, Egikal can be seen near the foot of the mountain.

== See also ==
- Myat-Loam
- Mount Shani
- Mount Kazbek

== Sources ==
- Janashvili, Mose (1897). Известия грузинских летописей и историков о Северном Кавказе и России [Bulletin of Georgian chronicles and historians about the North Caucasus and Russia] (in Russian). Tiflis: Tip. K. P. Kozlovskogo. pp. 1–209.
- Bazorkin, Murad (1937). История ингушей по известиям Вахушти о дзурдзуках [History of the Ingush according to Vakhushti's news about the Dzurdzuks] (PDF) (in Russian). Nalchik: El-Fa. pp. 1–300.
- Tarakanova, Marina (2023). Самые лучшие места России и мира 4D [The best places in Russia and the world 4D] (in Russian). Nalchik: Mezhizdat. pp. 1–160. ISBN 978-5-17-152205-6.
