= Loamaro =

Self-name of the Ingush which literally translates to "mountaineer" in Ingush language

Loamaro (Ingush: Лоамаро, romanized: Loamaruo; Chechen: Ламоро,) — the name of the inhabitants of the mountains in Chechnya and Ingushetia. Loamaro consists of loam (mountain) and the suffix -(a)ro. The ethnonym is literally translated from the Ingush and Chechen language as "mountaineer".

== History ==
The first report of the ethnonym in historical documents was in 1793 by Peter Simon Pallas.

“The Galgai, Halha or the Ingusches, call themselves Lamur, or mountaineers...”

— Julius von Klaproth

"Nazranians, Galgaevtsy and Galashians form a tribe of the Ingush, who call themselves Lamurs, that is, the inhabitants of the mountains."

— I. F. Blaramberg

== Toponymy ==
According to Professor B. Alborov, the name of the village Lamardon in the Prigorodny District is associated with one of the ethnonyms of the Ingush who once lived there:

«...they called themselves Lamar, Lamuar or Lamur, which means "highlanders" in the Ingush language. The area inhabited by them is named Lamardon by the surrounding Ossetians, which means Lamar’s habitat or Lamar’s basin, since the word “don” in Ossetian means not only “water”, but also “basin”.»

— B. A. Alborov

== See also ==
- Ghalghaï
- Gligvi
- Kalkans

== Bibliography ==
- Ужахов, М. Г. (1927). Ингушско-русский словарик [Ingush-Russian dictionary] (in Ingush and Russian). Владикавказ: Крайнациздат. pp. 1–185.
- Картоев, М. У. (1995). Краткий словарь ингушской общественно-политической лексики [Brief Dictionary of Ingush Socio-Political Vocabulary] (in Ingush and Russian). Назрань. pp. 1–96.
- Nichols, Johanna; Sprouse, Ronald L. (2004). Ghalghaai-Ingalsii, Ingalsii-Ghalghaai Lughat [Ingush-English and English-Ingush Dictionary] (in English and Ingush). London: RoutledgeCurzon. pp. 1–563. ISBN 9780415315951.
- Куркиев, А. С. (2005). Мургустов, М. С.; Ахриева, М. С.; Гагиев, К. А.; Куркиева, С. Х.; Султыгова, З. Н. (eds.). Ингушско-русский словарь: 11142 слова [Ingush-Russian dictionary: 11142 words] (in Russian). Магас: Сердало. pp. 1–545. ISBN 5-94452-054-X.
- Кодзоев, Н. Д. (2021). Хайрова, Р. Р. (ed.). Русско-ингушский словарь [Russian-Ingush dictionary] (in Ingush and Russian). Ростов-на-Дону: Типография «Лаки Пак». pp. 1–656. ISBN 978-5-906785-55-8.
- Pallas, Peter Simon (1811). Second voyage de Pallas, ou, Voyages entrepris dans les gouvernemens méridionaux de l'empire de Russie pendant les années 1793 et 1794 [Second voyage of Pallas, or, Voyages undertaken in governments of the Russian Empire during the years 1793 and 1794] (in French). Vol. 2. Paris: chez Guillaume. pp. 1–387.
- Klaproth, Heinrich Julius (1814). Travels in the Caucasus and Georgia: Performed in the Years 1807 and 1808, by Command of the Russian Government. Translated by Shoberl, Frederic. London: Henry Colburn. pp. 1–421.
- Робакидзе, А. И., ed. (1968). Кавказский этнографический сборник. Очерки этнографии Горной Ингушетии [Caucasian ethnographic collection. Essays on the ethnography of Mountainous Ingushetia] (in Russian). Vol. 2. Тбилиси: Мецниереба. pp. 1–333.
- Бларамберг, И. Ф. (1992). Кавказская рукопись: полев. исслед / Пер. И. М. Назарова, А. И. Петрова, введ. и коммент. И. М. Назарова. [1-е изд. на русск. яз. оригинальной работы И. Бларамберга "Историческое, топографическое, статистическое, этнографическое и военное описание Кавказа"] (in Russian). Ставрополь: Ставропольское книжное издательство. pp. 1–240. ISBN 5-7644-0662-5.
- Бларамберг, И. Ф. (2010). Историческое, топографическое, статистическое, этнографическое и военное описание Кавказа [Historical, topographical, statistical, ethnographic and military description of the Caucasus] (in Russian). Translated by Назарова, И. М. Москва: Надыршин. pp. 1–402. ISBN 978-5-902744-10-8.
- Алборов, Б. А. (1979). Некоторые вопросы осетинской филологии [Some questions of Ossetian philology] (in Russian). Орджоникидзе: ИР. pp. 1–315.
