= Ghalghai =

Self-name of the Ingush people

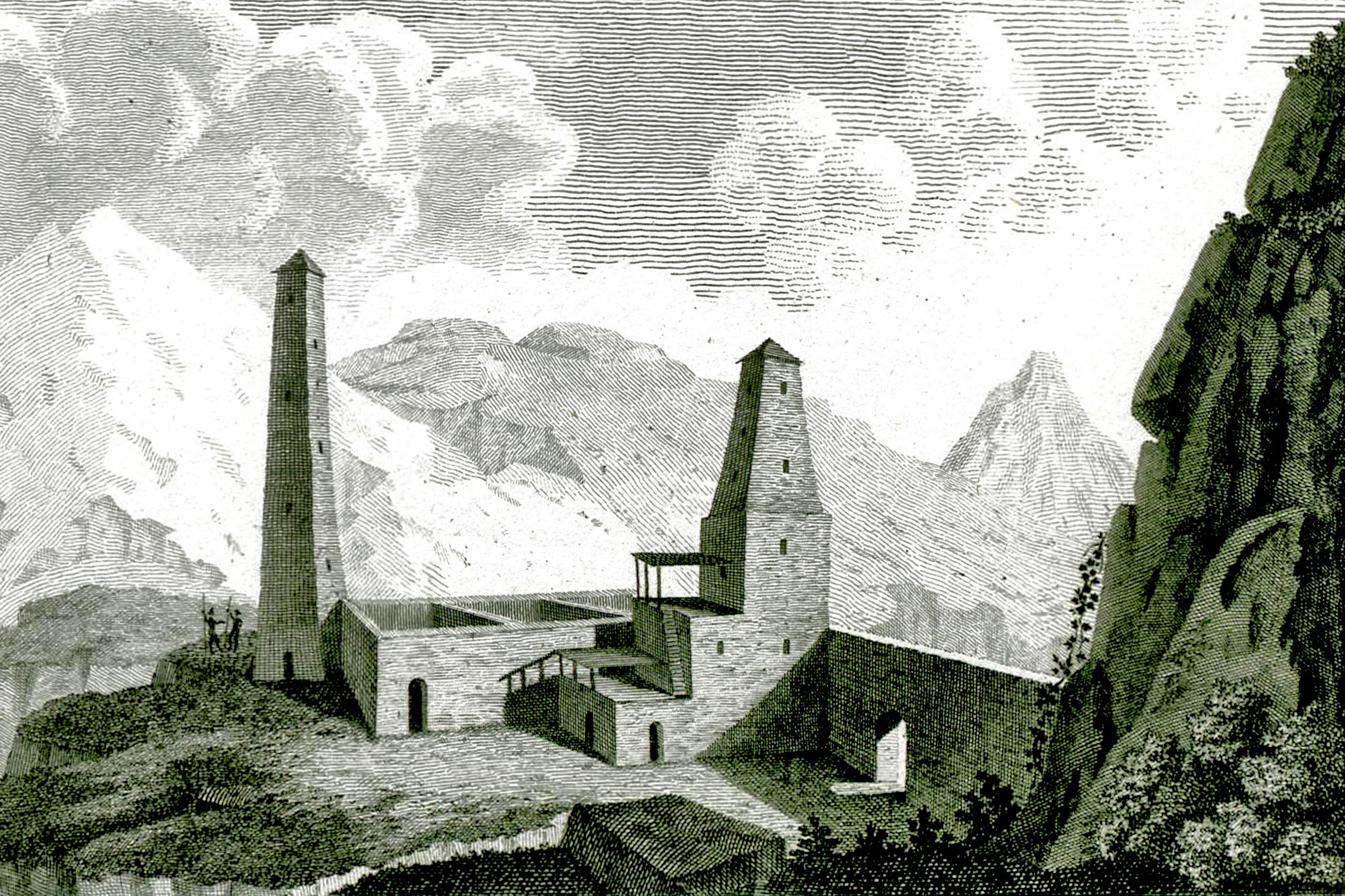
A medieval Ghalghai outpost built on a rocky ledge in the Assa Gorge, drawn by Moritz von Engelhardt in 1815

Ghalghai (Ingush: pl. гIалгIай, [ˈʁəlʁɑj], sg. гIалгIа, [ˈʁəlʁɑ]) is the self-name (endonym) of the Ingush people.

There's no consensus among scholars on the etymology of the ethnonym as there exists different theories and speculations on its etymology. However, it is most often associated with the word "ghalā" (гIала), meaning "tower" or "fortress" and the plural form of the suffix of person, "gha" (гIа), thus, translated as "people/inhabitants of towers". It is also associated by some scholars with the ancient Gargareans and Gelae mentioned in the classical sources.

In Georgian sources, the ethnonym is mentioned in the form of Gligvi as an ethnonym during the reign of Mirian I, as well as the ruler of Kakheti Kvirike III. In Russian sources, "Ghalghai" first becomes known in the second half of the 16th century, in the form of "Kalkans/Kolkans", "Kalkan people".

== Morphology ==
The Chechen linguist, doctor of philological sciences Katy Chokaev, analyzed the internal structure of the ethnonym. According to him:

"In both the Chechen and Ingush languages, the ethnonym is divided into two parts: ghal+gha in the singular form and ghal+ghai in the plural form. The initial sound (gh) is an aspirated, back-lingual consonant, reminiscent of the Ukrainian fricative (g)¹. The same sound is present in the second syllable. The first syllable is stressed with a short middle [ǎ]. The second [ā] is long. The sonorant non-syllabic [th] in the outcome of the plural form is a plural formant."

== Orthography ==
The ethnonym is spelled and pronounced in Ingush in its plural form as ghalghai (гӀалгӀай, [ˈʁəlʁɑj]), written and spelled in its singular form as ghalgha (гӀалгӀа, [ˈʁəlʁɑ]); in declension by cases: ghalghacho/ghalghaicho (гӀалгӀачо/гӀалгӀайчо; ergative case), ghalghachuntsa/ghalghaichuntsa (гӀалгӀачунца/гӀалгӀайчунца; genitive case), ghalghachuntsa/ghalghaichuntsa (гӀалгӀачунна/гӀалгӀайчунна; dative case).

Variants of the ethnonym ghalghai in the languages that neighbor the Ingush:

Ethnonyms	Transl.	Languages	Ref.
гъалгъаядо	ǧalǧayado	Akhvakh	
гъалгъайол	ǧalǧayol	Andi	
гъалгъаял	ǧalǧayal	Avar	
гъалгъаяди	ǧalǧayadi	Bagvalal	
гъалгъдирал	ǧalǧdiral	Botlikh	
гъалгъаяди	ǧalǧayadi	Chamalal	
гӀалгӀай/гӀалгӀаай	ghalghai/ghalghaai (Note: According to Ibragim Aliroev, the spelling ghalghaai is present in the literary Ingush dialect, while in dialects like Cheberloi, it is spelled ghalghai.)	Ingush	
ღლიღვი/ღილღვი	ghlighvi/ghilghvi (Note: According to Ivane Javakhishvili, the ethnonym ghalgha was known in Tusheti, but the term ghilghvi was commonly used in Tushetian folk poems, while in other parts of Georgia it was customary to designate them as ghlighvi.)	Georgian	
гъалгъаяди	ǧalǧayadi	Godoberi	
гъалгъаяди	ǧalǧayadi	Karata	
къалгъай	qalǧai	Kumyk	
хъулгъа	qulǧa	Ossetian	
гъалгъаяри	ǧalǧayari	Tindi	

== Etymology ==
There is no consensus among scholars on the etymology of the ethnonym, therefore different theories and speculations exist on its etymology. Some scholars (e.g. Yunus Desheriev, Ibragim Aliroev) consider that "ghalghai" means "people/inhabitants of towers", while others (e.g. Evgeny Krupnov, Adrienne Mayor) connect the ethnonym to either Gargareans or to Gelae (Ivane Javakhishvili, Arnold Chikobava). Versions connecting ghalghai to the legendary figure Gha/Galga or to the God of Sun/Sky Gal in Vainakh religion are also found.

=== "People of towers" ===
A number of scholars (e.g. Anatoly Genko, Yunus Desheriev, Ibragim Aliroev) connected ghalghai to the word "ghalā" (гIала, 'tower/fortress') thus, translating the word from Ingush as "people/inhabitants of towers".

According to this version, ghalghai is combination of two Ingush words, "ghalā" (гIала, 'tower/fortress') and derivational affix "-gha" (гIа) Therefore, ghalghai is translated as "people/inhabitants of towers". Katy Chokaev considers the "-gha" in ghalghai the suffix of person "-gha", while Yunus Desheriev considers it a transformed affix from the Nakh affix "kho". He also notes that in Nakh languages, the sounds "kh" and "gh" often alternate which could have made the transformation of kho to gha. It's possible that in one of the dialects of Ingush language, case affix "-gha" was used instead to form the ethnonym. According to Ibragim Aliroev, the "-gha" in ghalghai is the Vainakh syllable for place, "gha" (cf. ma-ghara, 'up', ēgha, 'down').

=== Gelae ===
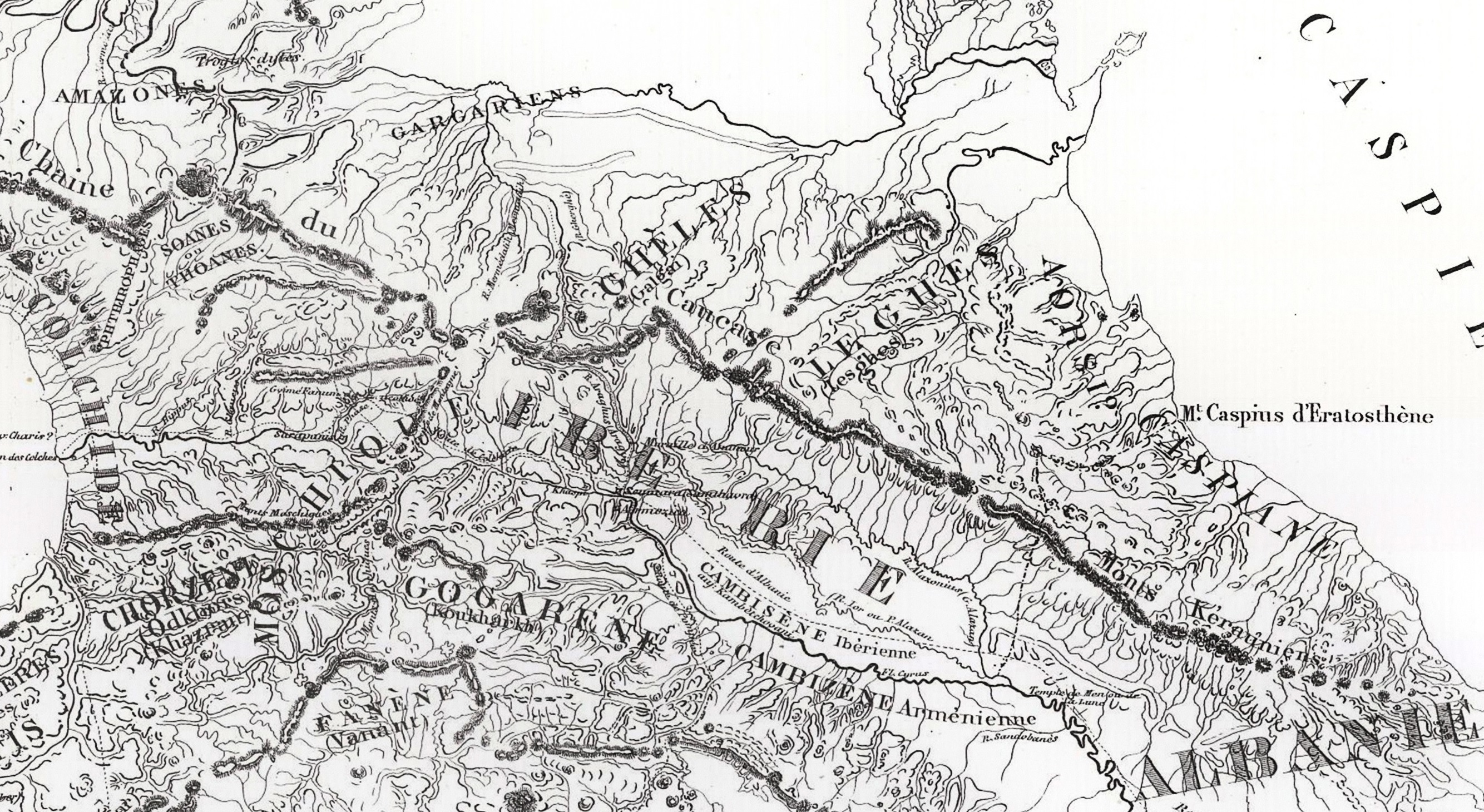
The Caucasus in the 1st century BC according to ancient Greek geographer Strabo, by Frédéric DuBois de Montperreux.

In the first century AD, the ancient Greek geographer Strabo mentioned the Gelae and Legae tribes in his work Geographica. He mentioned how according to Theophanes of Mytilene, who participated Caucasian campaign of Pompey, the Gelae and Legae lived between the Amazons and Albanians:

"Now Theophanes, who made the expedition with Pompey and was in the country of the Albanians, says that the Gelae and the Legae, Scythian people, live between the Amazons and the Albanians, and that the Mermadalis River flows there, midway between these people and the Amazons."

Georgian historian and linguist Ivane Javakhishvili and linguist, dr. of philological sciences Arnold Chikobava have connected the Gelae with the ethnonym ghalghai (Ingush).

=== Gargareans ===
Strabo had also mentioned another tribe inhabiting the Caucasus, that is, Gargareans. According to him, the Amazons lived on their borders:

But others, among whom are Metrodorus of Scepsis and Hypsicrates, who themselves, likewise, were not unacquainted with the region in question, say that the Amazons live on the borders of the Gargarians (...)"

The Gargareans like Gelae, were also connected to the ethnonym ghalghai by a number of scholars like Vasily Latyshev, Evgeny Krupnov, Gamrekeli, Adrienne Mayor.

=== Gal of the Vainakh religion ===
The Chechen linguist, dr. of philological sciences Katy Chokaev connected ghalghai with the name of the God of Sun/Sky Gal (ГӀал, Ghal) of the Vainakh religion. Together with plural form of suffix of person "-ghai", it formed the ethnonym which translates, according to Chokaev, as "those who pray to the God of Sun, Gal". He also found a parallel of this etymology with the ethnonym in Mountain Chechen dialects, Ghielaga (ГӀиелага). The cult of Gal was found in Ingushetia, and according to the Ossetian scholar, professor Boris Alborov, originated in Assa Gorge. Alborov noted that, linguistically, with the rise of the initial consonant, Gal could have formed from older Ingush terms Hal(a) and Al(a), both signifying "god" in ancient times.

=== Ancestor Gha ===
The Nakh legends recorded in the 19th century are often interpreted by researchers in a historical context, however, such use requires special source study methods and does not allow establishing an exact chronology to describe any events from the life of the ancestors of the Chechens and Ingush. In such legends, ethnonym ghalghai is connected to the legendary ancestor Gha. The Gha's name on the other hand, is explained due to him being supposedly named after leaf's name (Ingush: ГӀа, lit. 'leaf') as he was born with it in his hand.

Legends recorded by the Dargin ethnographer Bashir Dalgat in mountainous villages (auls) of Erzi and Falkhan mention how once upon a time there lived three brothers, Ga, Orshtkho/Arshtkho and Nakhcho, from whom the Galgai (Ingush), Orstkhoi and Nokhchi (Chechens) descended. The brothers arrived in the mountains from the east and settled in the area of Galga, from where they began to settle throughout the territories of modern Chechnya and Ingushetia. In Chechen legends about the origin of the Vainakhs, other combinations of the brothers' names were also found, for example, Ako/Akho and Shoto (eponyms for the Akkins and Shatois) could be added.

== History ==
=== Gligvi ===
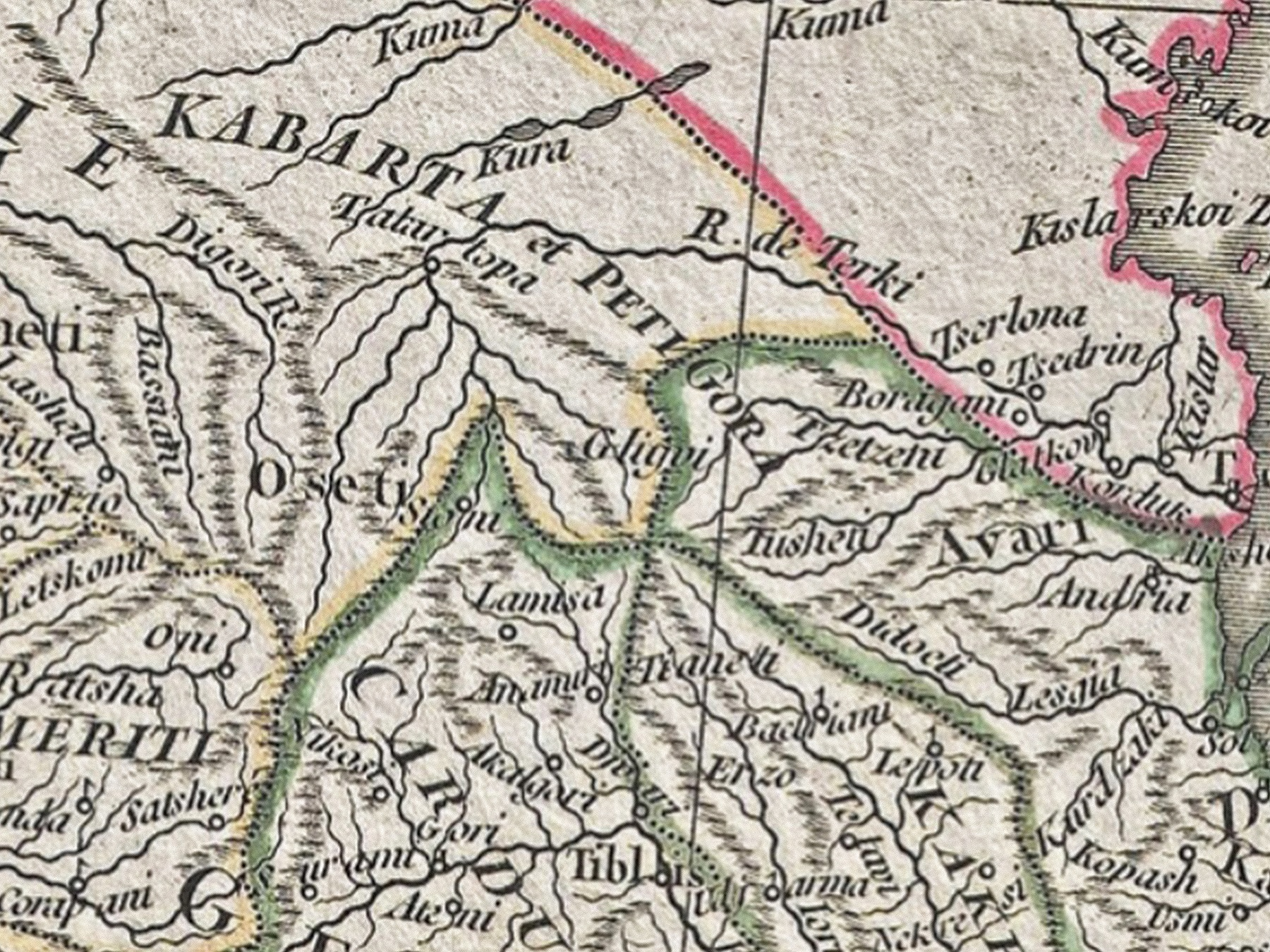
Ghalghai (Gligvi) on d'Anville's map in 1751

In Georgian sources, in the form of Gligvi, it is mentioned as an ethnonym that existed during the reign of Mirian I, as well as the ruler of Kakheti Kvirike III.

=== Kalkans ===
In the Russian sources of 16th–17th centuries, "Ghalghai" was known in the form of "Kalkans/Kolkans", "Kalkan people". Ethnonym "Kalkan" was first mentioned in the article list of Semyon Zvenigorodskiy and Diyak Torkh in 1589–1590. They were sent by Alexis of Russia to Georgia, when it so happened on their way back they were ambushed and attacked by the Kalkans. Later on, Kalkans become reported in many Russian sources of the 16th century, one of which

== Toponymy ==
- Ghalghai Mokhk (Гӏалгӏай Мохк) or Ghalghaiche (ГӀалгӏайче) — official native name of the Republic of Ingushetia.
- Ghalghai Niqh (ГIалгIай Никъ) — native name for the Darial Pass, also known as the Ghalghai Military Road or Georgian Military Road; also, the name of the medieval trade and transportation route that passed through the territory of mountainous Ingushetia (including Galanchozh).
- Ghalghai Koashke (ГIалгIай Коашке) — ancient outposts (stone towers), located in the Terek Gorge, Tarskoye Valley and the Assa Gorge. The outposts in the Assa Gorge of Ingushetia are also known as the Ghalghai Na'arge or Durdzuk Gates.
- Ghalghai Ārē (ГIалгIай Аре), Ingush lowland, located between Shaami-Yurt and Valerik in modern-day Achkhoy-Martan.
- Ghalghai-Yurt (ГIалгIай-Юрт), a village that was located near modern-day Valerik; also, the original name of modern-day Kamvileevskoye in the Prigorodny District.
- Ghalghai-Ch'ozh (ГIалгIай-ЧIож), a mountain corridor connecting Tsey-Loam to the Targim Basin. In some sources, also refers to the Assa Gorge.
- Ghalghai River (Georgian: ღლიღვის-წყალი, romanized: ghlighvis-ts'q'ali), medieval Georgian hydronym for the Assa River.

== See also ==
- Gligvi
- Kalkans

== Bibliography ==
=== English sources ===
- Anchabadze, George (2001). Vainakhs (The Chechen and Ingush). Tbilisi: Caucasian House. pp. 1–76.
- Mayor, Adrienne (2016). The Amazons: Lives and Legends of Warrior Women across the Ancient World. Princeton: Princeton University Press. pp. 1–544. ISBN 978-0691170275.
- Strabo (1928). "Book XI, Chapter 5". The Geography of Strabo. Vol. V. Loeb Classical Library.

=== Russian sources ===
- Alborov, B. A. (1928). "Ингушское "Гальерды" и осетинское "Аларды" (к вопросу об осетино-ингушских культурных взаимоотношениях)" [Ingush "Galyerdy" and Ossetian "Alardy" (on the issue of Ossetian-Ingush cultural relations)]. In Martirosian, G. K.; Razdorskiy, V. F.; Semyonov, L. P. (eds.). Известия Ингушского Научно-Исследовательского Института Краеведения [Bulletin of the Ingush Scientific Research Institute of Local Studies] (in Russian) (1st ed.). Vladikavkaz: Serdalo. pp. 349–430.
- Aliroev, I. Yu. (1975). Kurkiev, A. S.; et al. (eds.). Сравнительно-сопоставительный словарь отраслевой лексики чеченского и ингушского языков и диалектов [Comparative and comparative dictionary of industrial vocabulary of the Chechen and Ingush languages and dialects] (in Russian). Grozny: Chech.-Ing. kn. izd-vo. pp. 1–383.
- Aliroev, I. Yu. (1978). Нахские языки и культура [Nakh languages and culture] (in Russian). Grozny: Chech.-Ing. kn. izd-vo. pp. 1–291.
- Aliroev, I. Yu. (1990). Iriskhanov, I. A. (ed.). Язык, история и культура вайнахов [Language, history and culture of the Vainakhs] (in Russian). Grozny: Kniga. pp. 1–368. ISBN 5-766-0102-06.
- Bammatov, B. G.; Gajiakhmedov, N. Ē. (2011). Bammatov, B. G. (ed.). Къумукъча-орусча сёзлюк: 30 мингден артыкъ сёз бар/Кумыкско-русский словарь: более 30 тыс. слов [Kumyk-Russian dictionary: more than 30 thousand words] (PDF) (in Kumyk and Russian). Makhachkala: IYALI DNTS RAN. pp. 1–406.
- Barakhoeva, N. M.; Ilieva, F. M.; Khayrova, R. R. (2020). Ilieva, F. M. (ed.). Современный ингушский язык. Морфемика. Словообразование [Modern Ingush language. Morphemics. Word formation] (PDF) (in Ingush and Russian). Magas, Ingushetia: Kep. pp. 1–368. ISBN 978-5-4482-0072-4.
- Bekova, A. I.; Dudarov, U. B.; Ilieva, F. M.; Malsagova, L. D.; Tarieva, L. U. (2009). Barkinkhoeva, Z. M.; Bekova, A. I.; Dakhkilgov, I. A.; Zyazikov, R. M.; Ilieva, R. M.; Malsagova, L. D.; Nakastoev, Kh. A.; Tarieva, L. U.; Tumgoeva, Z. M.; Khayrova, R. R.; Khayrova, Kh. R.; Shadiev, S. A. (eds.). ГӀалгӀай-эрсий дошлорг: 24 000 дош/Ингушско-русский словарь: 24 000 слов [Ingush-Russian Dictionary: 24 000 words] (in Ingush and Russian). Nalchik: GP KBR "Respublikanskiy poligrafkombinat im. Revolyutsii 1905 g.". pp. 1–990. ISBN 978-5-88195-965-4.
- Бердзенешвили, Н. А.; Дондуа, В. Д.; Думбадзе, М. К.; Меликишвили, Г. А.; Месхиа, Ш. А. (1962). История Грузии: с древнейших времён до 60-х годов XIX века [History of Georgia: from ancient times to the 60s of the XIX century] (in Russian). Тбилиси: Издательство учебно-педагогической литературы. pp. 1–254.
- Chikobava, A. S. (2010). Введение в иберийско-кавказское языкознание [Introduction to Iberian-Caucasian Linguistics] (in Russian). Тбилиси: Тбилисский Гос. Университет им. И. Джаважишвили. Изд. «Универсал».
- Chokaev, K. Z. (1991). Iriskhanov, I. A. (ed.). Вайн мотт — вайн истори [Our language – our history] (in Chechen). Grozny: Kniga. pp. 1–192. ISBN 5-766-0102-06.
- Chokaev, K. Z. (1992). Iriskhanov, I. A. (ed.). Нахские языки: Историко-филологические разыскания [Nakh languages: historical and philological research] (in Russian). Grozny: Kniga. pp. 1–128. ISBN 5-766-0102-06.
- Dakhkilgov, I. A. (1978). Zyazikov, A. A. (ed.). Исторический фольклор чеченцев и ингушей [Historical folklore of the Chechens and Ingush] (in Russian). Grozny: Chech.-Ing. gos. un-t. pp. 1–135.
- Dalgat, U. B. (1972). Dakhkilgov, I. A. (ed.). Героический эпос чеченцев и ингушей [The heroic epic of the Chechens and Ingush] (in Russian). Moskva: Nauka. pp. 1–469.
- Desheriev, Yu. D. (1963). Kuzmenkova, N. T.; Zakharova, S. P. (eds.). Сравнительно-историческая грамматика нахских языков и проблемы происхождения и исторического развития горских кавказских народов [Comparative-Historical Grammar of the Nakh Languages and Problems of the Origin and Historical Development of the Mountain Caucasian Peoples] (in Russian). Grozny: Chech.-Ing. kn. izd-vo. pp. 1–554.
- Gatsalova, L. B.; Parsieva, L. K. (2011). Стыр уырыссаг-ирон дзырдуат/Большой русско-осетинский словарь [Great Russian-Ossetian dictionary] (in Ossetic and Russian). Vladikavkaz: SOIGSI. pp. 1–688. ISBN 978-5-905691-19-5.
- Gimbatov, M. M.; Isakov, I. A.; Magomedkhanov, M. M.; Khalilov, M. Sh. (2006). Gimbatov, M. M.; Abdullaev, I. Kh.; Bammatov, B. G.; Gyulmagomedov, A. G.; Jidalaev, N. S.; Zagirov, Z. M.; Isaev, M.-Sh. A.; Kurbanov, K. K.; Magomedov, A. G.; Musaev, M.-S. M.; Samedov, J. S.; Khalilov, M. Sh. (eds.). Авар-гӀурус словарь: 36-азаргогIанасеб рагIи/Аварско-русский словарь: Около 36 000 слов [Avar-Russian dictionary: around 36 000 words]. Natsionalno-russiie slovari: Literaturnye yazyki Dagestana (in Avaric and Russian). Makhachkala: DNTS RAN. pp. 1–970, 1–588.
- Genko, A. N. (1930). "Из культурного прошлого ингушей" [From the cultural past of the Ingush] (PDF). Записки коллегии востоковедов при Азиатском музее [Notes of the College of Orientalists at the Asian Museum] (PDF) (in Russian). Vol. 5. Leningrad: Izd-vo Akademii nauk SSSR. pp. 681–761.
- Janashvili, M. G. (1897). Известия грузинских летописей и историков о Северном Кавказе и России [Bulletin of Georgian chronicles and historians about the North Caucasus and Russia] (in Russian). Tiflis: Tip. K. P. Kozlovskogo. pp. 1–209.
- Volkova, N. G. (1973). Этнонимы и племенные названия Северного Кавказа [Ethnonyms and tribal names of the North Caucasus] (in Russian). Москва: Наука. pp. 1–210.
- Krupnov, E. I. (1971). Средневековая Ингушетия [Medieval Ingushetia] (in Russian). Moskva: Nauka. pp. 1–211.
- Kurkiev, A. S. (1979). Основные вопросы лексикологии ингушского языка [The main questions of the lexicology of the Ingush language] (in Russian). Grozny: Chech.-Ing. kn. izd-vo. pp. 1–254.
- Kurkiev, A. S. (2005). Murgustov, M. S.; Akhrieva, M. S.; Gagiev, K. A.; Kurkieva, S. Kh.; Sultygova, Z. N. (eds.). Ингушско-русский словарь: 11142 слова [Ingush-Russian dictionary: 11142 words] (in Russian). Magas: Serdalo. pp. 1–545. ISBN 5-94452-054-X.
- Kusheva, E. N. (1963). Народы Северного Кавказа и их связи с Россией (вторая половина XVI — 30-е годы XVII века) [The peoples of the North Caucasus and their relations with Russia (the second half of the 16th - 30s of the 17th century)] (in Russian). Москва: Izd-vo Akademii nauk SSSR. pp. 1–370.
- Latyshev, V. V. (1947). "Известия древних писателей о Скифии и Кавказе" [News of ancient writers about Scythia and the Caucasus]. Вестник древней истории [Bulletin of ancient history] (in Russian). Moskva-Leningrad: Izd-vo Akademii nauk SSSR.
- Marr, N. Ya. (1922). Кавказские племенные названия и местные параллели [Caucasian tribal names and local parallels]. Rossiyskaya akademiya nauk. Trudy komissio oi izucheniyu plemennogo sostava naseleniya Rossii (in Russian). Petrograd: Ros. gos. Akadem. tip. pp. 1–39.
- Robakidze, A. I., ed. (1968). Кавказский этнографический сборник. Очерки этнографии Горной Ингушетии [Caucasian ethnographic collection. Essays on the ethnography of Mountainous Ingushetia] (in Russian). Vol. 2. Tbilisi: Mecniereba. pp. 1–333.
- Suleimanov, A. S. (1978). Топонимия Чечено-Ингушетии. II часть: Горная Ингушетия (юго-западная часть), Горная Чечня (центральная и юго-восточная части). Грозный: Чечено-Ингушское книжное изд-во. pp. 1–289.
- Suleimanov, A. S. (1980). Топонимия Чечено-Ингушетии. III часть: Предгорная равнина). Грозный: Чечено-Ингушское книжное изд-во. pp. 1–209.
- Tishkov, V. A., ed. (2001). Расы и народы [Races and peoples] (in Russian). Vol. 26. Moskva: Nauka. pp. 1–269. ISBN 5-02-008712-2.
- Tsagaeva, A. D. (1971). Топонимия Северной Осетии [Toponymy of North Ossetia] (in Russian). Vol. 1. Орджоникидзе. pp. 1–240.
- Yakovlev, N. F. (1925). Ингуши [The Ingush] (in Russian). Moskva: Tip. Gosizdata "Krasny Proletariy". pp. 1–134.

=== Georgian sources ===
- Javakhishvili, I. (1937). ქართული ერის ისტორიის შესავალი [Introduction to the history of the Georgian nation] (PDF) (in Georgian). Vol. 2. Tbilisi: Ssrk' metsnierebata ak'ademia - sakartvelos piliali. pp. 1–754.
