= Torshkhoy =

Ingush clan (teip)

Torshkhoy Тӏоаршхой
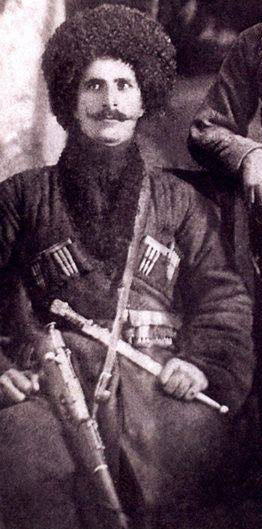
- Artagan Torshkhoyev, a representative of the teip

Regions with significant populations
- Russia: ?
- Ingushetia: ?
- Dagestan: ?

Languages
- Ingush

Religion
- Sunni Islam

Torshkhoy (Ingush: Тӏоаршхой, romanized: Thoarshkhoy), also known in Ingush folklore as Them-Thoarshkhoy (Ingush: ТӀем-Tӏоаршхой, lit. Torshkhoy-warriors), is an Ingush clan (teip) which belongs to the Fyappin society. The ancestral auls of Torshkhoy are Tyarsh and Falkhan. A small number of representatives of the teip live in Aukh, where they are known under the name Vyappiy.

== History ==
During the second half of 16th century when Ingush were returning back to Angusht, the Torshkhoy were the first to settle in and build an eponymous aul Tarsh, named after the ancestral aul of Torshkhoy - Tyarsh (Ingush: Тӏаьрш). Subsequently, the Tarskaya valley (Ingush: Тӏаьрш-Аре) was named after the eponymous aul of Tarsh, which in Russian transcription became spelled as Tars, thus the name.

On January 8, 1811, foremen of 13 mountainous Kistin (Fyappin) villages including Tarsh (Tyarsh) made act of oath for the Russian Empire. However it is worth saying that even after the oath of individual Ingush society or clans, the former Russian-Ingush relations remained the same. In fact, both sides took these types of oaths as a conclusion union treaties.

The aul Tarsh in Tarskaya valley was also marked in various maps of 19th century as "Tarshoy-Yurt" or "Tarss". (Note: Карта Закавказскаго края съ пограничными землями 1834, South-west of Vladikavkaz Тарсь is marked.; Карта Кавказскаго края съ пограничными землями 1834, South-west of Vladikavkaz Тарсь is marked.; Карта Кавказскаго Края 1842, South-west of Vladikavkaz Таршой-Юрт is marked.; Карта Малой Чечни 1847, South-west of Vladikavkaz Таршой-Юрт is marked.; Karte von dem Kaukasischen Isthmus und von Armenien 1850, South-west of Vladikavkaz Tarſs is marked.; Karte vom Kaukasus 1855, South-west of Vladikavkaz Tars.; Karte des Kaukasischen Isthmus 1856, South-west of Vladikavkaz Tarss is marked.) According to A. N. Genko, the Fyappin-inhabited Tarshoy-Yurt shows the role of Fyappins in the colonization of the plains. As of 1859, the ancestral aul of Tyarsh in mountainous Ingushetia was part of the Military-Ossetian Okrug as part of the Kistin (Fyappin) society and it had 47¼ households.

== Composition ==
Torshkhoy is an Ingush clan (teip), which belongs to the Fyappin society. It includes many patronymics as follows: Adzhievs (from Falkhan), Alievs (from Keskem), Artsygovs, Babkhoevs, Daskievs, Mestoevs, Muradovs (from Dlinnaya Solina, Galgai-Yurt, Nazran, Novy Dzheyrakh), Padievs or Pidievs, Sautievs (includes Barakievs, Dudarkievs and Sovtaevs or Sovtievs), Solsanovs, Tovmarzievs, Shavkhalovs or Shaukhalovs (from Dolakovo), Chaploevs (from Nazran) and Chemburzievs.

== Settlement ==
Torshkoy with their many patronymics (Note: Adzhievs (from Falkhan), Alievs (from Keskem), Artsygovs, Babkhoevs, Daskievs, Mestoevs, Muradovs (from Dlinnaya Solina, Galgai-Yurt, Nazran, Novy Dzheyrakh), Padievs or Pidievs, Sautievs (includes Barakievs, Dudarkievs and Sovtaevs or Sovtievs), Solsanovs, Tovmarzievs, Shavkhalovs or Shaukhalovs (from Dolakovo), Chaploevs (from Nazran) and Chemburzievs.) live in many parts of Ingushetia: Barsuki, Ekazhevo, Dolakovo, Dlinnaya Solina, Galgai-Yurt, Kantyshevo, Keskem, Nazran, Novy Dzheyrakh, Novy Redant, Plievo, Yandare, Verkhnie Achaluki. Small number of representatives of the trip also live in Dagestan, in the region of Aukh, where they are known under the name Vyappiy.

== In folklore ==
In 1961, according to the words of 95-year-old Murzabekov Abdul Bimurzievich, in the presence of 98-year-old Murzabekov Labzan Khunievich, 90-year-old Torshkhoev Murtsal Tosoltovich, the following legend was recorded:

"From the village of Taarshi, where the Torshkhoevtsy lived, the Torshkhoevets Ferhast moved to the village of Falkhan with three sons: Akom, Tuokyom and Kot. At about the same time, in The Goyty, now called Beini, was inhabited by the Fyappin tribe, whose headman was Gam (or GӀam), so they were also called Gamians (GӀamank'an). This tribe was very warlike and well-armed, then everyone in that area was afraid of them, and the area was called so - Fyappinsky. The Fyappins tribe began to try to oust the Torshkhoevs from Falkhan, to prevent them in every possible way. Despite everything, the settlers resisted them, and when the Torshkhoev brothers had offspring, sons and grandchildren, when they became a strong tribe, a bloody conflict took place between them and Fyappi, which ended in the complete destruction of the Fyappins-Gamovites. Only those Fyappis survived who were away at the time. This victory cost the Torshkhoevites great losses, but they were determined to destroy those who were supposed to return from their departure. When the Gamovtsy, who were away, were returning, they were warned in Dzheirakh that all their brothers had been destroyed, but the Gamovtsy did not believe, saying that no one would dare to touch Fyappi, and continued on their way. They were repeatedly warned that the fate of their fellow tribesmen awaits them in Goyty. Gamovtsy began to doubt, and the youngest of them offered to go ahead of the detachment as a scout, and if he was attacked, the rest would retreat and survive. And so they did. Ahead, in the thickets, an ambush really awaited them, the scout was seized, dragged from his horse and killed. The rest of the Gamovites, seeing this, stepped back and left the village forever. Goyts left that region through Georgia to Turkey. Torshkhoevtsy began to live on the conquered land. The village of Goyty, due to the fact that many people died there, was renamed Beini (bein-death), and a little lower down the hillside those who died in that massacre were buried, later the village of Kasheti appeared next to that cemetery (kash-grave, kashmazh -cemetery), in which the owners of the territory, the Murzabekovs, the Shovkhalovs and the Mestoevs, allowed the Gambotovs to settle. From the three sons of Ferkhast Torshkhoev, the following surnames originated: Ak'a had 4 sons, but after the massacre with Fyappi, only one remained - Morkhazh, Morkhazh had 2 sons - Taybar and Mesto. From Mesto — Mestoevy. Taibara's son is Kortage, Kortazh's son is Kilashkhan, Kilashana's sons are Murzabek, Elmurza and Morhazh (younger). From Murzabek - Murzabekovs, lived in the village. Beini. From Elmurza - the Beinoevs (named from the village of Beini), lived in the village of Falkhan. Morhaj (Jr.) had a son, Arzhebar, from him - the Arzhebarievs, lived in Beini and Falhan. One of the sons of Mesto was Artsig, from him the Artsigovs lived in Beini. T'ok'a Ferkhastovich had 6 sons, four of them died in the war with the Fyappins, and Shovkhal and Dzarakh remained. From Shovkhal, the Shovkhalovs lived in Beini; from Dzarakh, the Dzarakhovs and Sampiyevs lived in Falkhan and Metskhal. From the third son of Ferkhast, Kot, came the Kotievs (not to be confused with the Kitievs - this is a different teip), the Kotievs also have the surname Khakievs, everyone lived in Metskhal. The Keligovs descended from Kelig, the orphaned son of Kilashkhan's sister, who took his nephew to himself, raised and raised him, and when Kelig matured, he stayed in Beini, where he built himself a tower. Before the war between the Torshkhoevs and the Fyappins, there were no stone towers in Goity (Beini), they began to be built by Toarshkhoy after that massacre: the Murzabekovs had 4 towers, the Shovkhalovs had 3 towers, the Mestoevs had 1 tower, and the Keligovs had 1 tower."

== Notable people ==
- Ibragim Torshkoev, Ingush poet.
- Zarifa Sautieva, Ingush museum director and political activist

== Bibliography ==
=== Russian sources ===
- Куркиев, А. С. (2005). Мургустов, М. С.; Ахриева, М. С.; Гагиев, К. А.; Куркиева, С. Х.; Султыгова, З. Н. (eds.). Ингушско-русский словарь: 11142 слова [Ingush-Russian dictionary: 11142 words] (in Russian). Магас: Сердало. pp. 1–545. ISBN 5-94452-054-X.
- Кодзоев, Н. Д.; Киева, З. Х. (2021). Накостхоев, Х. А.; Хайрова, Р. Р. (eds.). Ономастикон Ингушетии [Onomasticon of Ingushetia] (in Russian). Москва: ТПК «Центробланк». pp. 1–121. ISBN 978-5-91303-022-1.
- Волкова, Н. Г. (1973). Этнонимы и племенные названия Северного Кавказа [Ethnonyms and tribal names of the North Caucasus] (in Russian). Москва: Наука. pp. 1–210.
- Дахкильгов, Ш. Э-Х. (1991). Зязиков, А. А. (ed.). Происхождение ингушских фамилий [Origin of Ingush surnames] (Field research) (in Russian). Грозный: 1991. pp. 1–108.
- Ахмадов, Ш. Б. (2002). Яндаров, А. Д. (ed.). Чечня и Ингушетия в XVIII — начале XIX века. (Очерки социально-экономического развития и общественно-политического устройства Чечни и Ингушетии в XVIII — начале XIX века) [Chechnya and Ingushetia in the 18th - early 19th centuries. (Essays on the socio-economic development and socio-political structure of Chechnya and Ingushetia in the 18th - early 19th centuries)] (PDF). Элиста: АПП «Джангар». pp. 1–527. Archived from the original (PDF) on 2015-09-23.
- Атабиев, Б. Х. (2016). Проект границ территории, предмета охраны и зон охраны объекта культурного наследия федерального значения "комплекс сооружений" XV-XVII вв. (ансамбль). Республика Ингушетия, Джейрахский Муниципальный Район, с.п. Ольгетти, с. Эрзи [The project of the boundaries of the territory, the object of protection and zones of protection object of cultural heritage of federal significance "a complex of structures" of the XV-XVII centuries. (ensemble). Republic of Ingushetia, Dzheyrakhsky Municipal District, r.m. Olgetti, v. Erzi] (PDF) (in Russian). Нальчик: Институт Археологии Кавказа. pp. 1–154.
- Дзарахова, З. М. (2016). "О горном селении Фалхан (полевые этнографические материалы)" [About the mountain village of Falkhan (field ethnographic materials)]. ВЕСТНИК Ингушского научно-исследовательского института гуманитарных наук им. Ч. Э. Ахриева (in Russian). No. 2. Магас. pp. 22–29 (1–8 as PDF).
- Общенациональная Комиссия по рассмотрению вопросов, связанных с определением территории и границ Ингушетии (2021). Всемирный конгресс ингушского народа (ed.). Доклад о границах и территории Ингушетии (общие положения) [Report on the borders and territory of Ingushetia (general provisions)] (archival documents, maps, illustrations) (in Russian). Назрань. pp. 1–175.
- Дзарахова, З. М.-Т. (2015). "К вопросу об истории селения Барт-Бос (из полевых этнографических материалов)" [On the question of the history of the village of Bart-Bos (from field ethnographic materials)]. 245 лет вхождения ингушетии в состав россии: время, события, люди: Материалы Всероссийской научной конференции [245 years of Ingushetia joining Russia: time, events, people: Proceedings of the All-Russian Scientific Conference] (PDF) (in Russian). Назрань: ООО «Пилигрим». pp. 126–131. ISBN 978-5-98993-244-3.
- Кодзоев, Н. Д. (2020). Ингушские населённые пункты: Ангушт [Ingush settlements: Angusht] (in Russian). Назрань: «Кеп». pp. 1–64. ISBN 978-5-4482-0066-3.
- Долгиева, М. Б.; Картоев, М. М.; Кодзоев, Н. Д.; Матиев, Т. Х. (2013). Кодзоев, Н. Д. (ed.). История Ингушетии [History of Ingushetia] (4th ed.). Ростов-на-Дону: Южный издательский дом. pp. 1–600. ISBN 978-5-98864-056-1.
- Генко, А. Н. (1930). "Из культурного прошлого ингушей" [From the cultural past of the Ingush]. Записки коллегии востоковедов при Азиатском музее [Notes of the College of Orientalists at the Asian Museum] (in Russian). Vol. 5. Ленинград: Издательство Академии наук СССР. pp. 681–761.
- Картоев, М. М. (2014). Ингушетия в политике Российской империи на Кавказе. XIX век. Сборник документов и материалов [Ingushetia in the policy of the Russian Empire in the Caucasus. 19th century. Collection of documents and materials]. История Ингушетии: открытый архив (in Russian) (1 ed.). Ростов-на-Дону: Южный издательский дом. pp. 1–604. ISBN 978-5-98864-060-8.
- "Краткая история селения Бейни" [Brief history of the village of Beini]. www.beini.ru (in Russian). 2016-06-23.
- "Торшхо́ев" [Torshkhóev]. Great Russian Encyclopedia (in Russian).
- Катаева, Марина (2020-02-12). ""Надеюсь, не закончу как Мандельштам". Как Зарифа Саутиева стала самой известной женщиной Ингушетии" ["I hope I won't end up like Mandelstam." How Zarifa Sautieva became the most famous woman in Ingushetia]. BBC News Online (in Russian).

=== Maps ===
- "Карта Закавказскаго края съ пограничными землями, составленная изъ материалов Генеральнаго Штаба отдѣльнаго Кавказскаго Корпуса въ 1834 году" [Map of the Transcaucasian Territory with border lands, compiled from the materials of the General Staff of a separate Caucasian Corps in 1834]. www.dzurdzuki.com (in Russian). 1834.
- "Карта Кавказскаго края съ пограничными землями: Составлена при Генеральномъ Штабе Отдельнаго Кавказскаго Корпуса въ 1834 году" [Map of the Caucasus region with border lands: Compiled at the General Staff of the Separate Caucasian Corps in 1834]. www.disk.yandex.ru (in Russian). 1834.
- "Карта Кавказскаго Края: Составлена и Литографирована въ ¹/840 000 настоящей величины при Генеральномъ Штабе Отдельнаго Кавказскаго Корпуса въ 1842-го года" [Map of the Caucasus Region: Compiled and Lithographed in ¹/840,000 of this size at the General Staff of the Separate Caucasian Corps in 1842]. www.yandex.ru (in Russian). Тифлисъ. 1842.
- "Карта Малой Чечни" [Map of Minor Chechnya]. www.commons.m.wikimedia.org. Кавказская область. Военно-топографическая карта Кавказского края 1847 года (в масштабе 10 верст) (in Russian). 1847.
- "Karte von dem Kaukasischen Isthmus und von Armenien / Entworfem und gezeichnet nach eigenem Houzontal - Aufnahmen und mit Benutzung der vorhandenen Materialen von Professor Dr. Karl Koch; H. Mahlmann sc" [Map of the Caucasus Isthmus and Armenia / Designed and drawn according to Houzontal's own Houzontal - Photographs and using the available materials by Professor Dr. Karl Koch; H. Mahlmann sc.]. www.bibliotecavirtual.defensa.gob.es (in German). 1850.
- Handke, F. (1855). "Karte vom Kaukasus nach der russischen General-Stabs-Karte in 4 Bl. und andern guten Materialien" [Map of the Caucasus based on the Russian General Staff map in 4 sheets and other good materials]. www.commons.m.wikimedia.org (in German). Glogau: Flemming, C.
- Grassl, J. (1856). "Karte des Kaukasischen Isthmus" [Map of the Caucasian Isthmus]. www.commons.m.wikimedia.org (in German). Hildburghausen: Bibliographischen Instituts.
