= Tarsky =

Tarsky (masculine), Tarskaya (feminine), or Tarskoye (neuter) may refer to:

- Tarsky District, a district of Omsk Oblast, Russia
- Alfred Tarski (1901–1983), Polish logician and mathematician
- Tarsky (rural locality), a rural locality (a khutor) in Stavropol Krai, Russia
- Tarskaya, a rural locality (a settlement at the station) in Zabaykalsky Krai, Russia
- Tarskoye, a rural locality (a selo) in the Republic of North Ossetia–Alania, Russia
