= Gelae (tribe) =

Ancient Scythian tribe

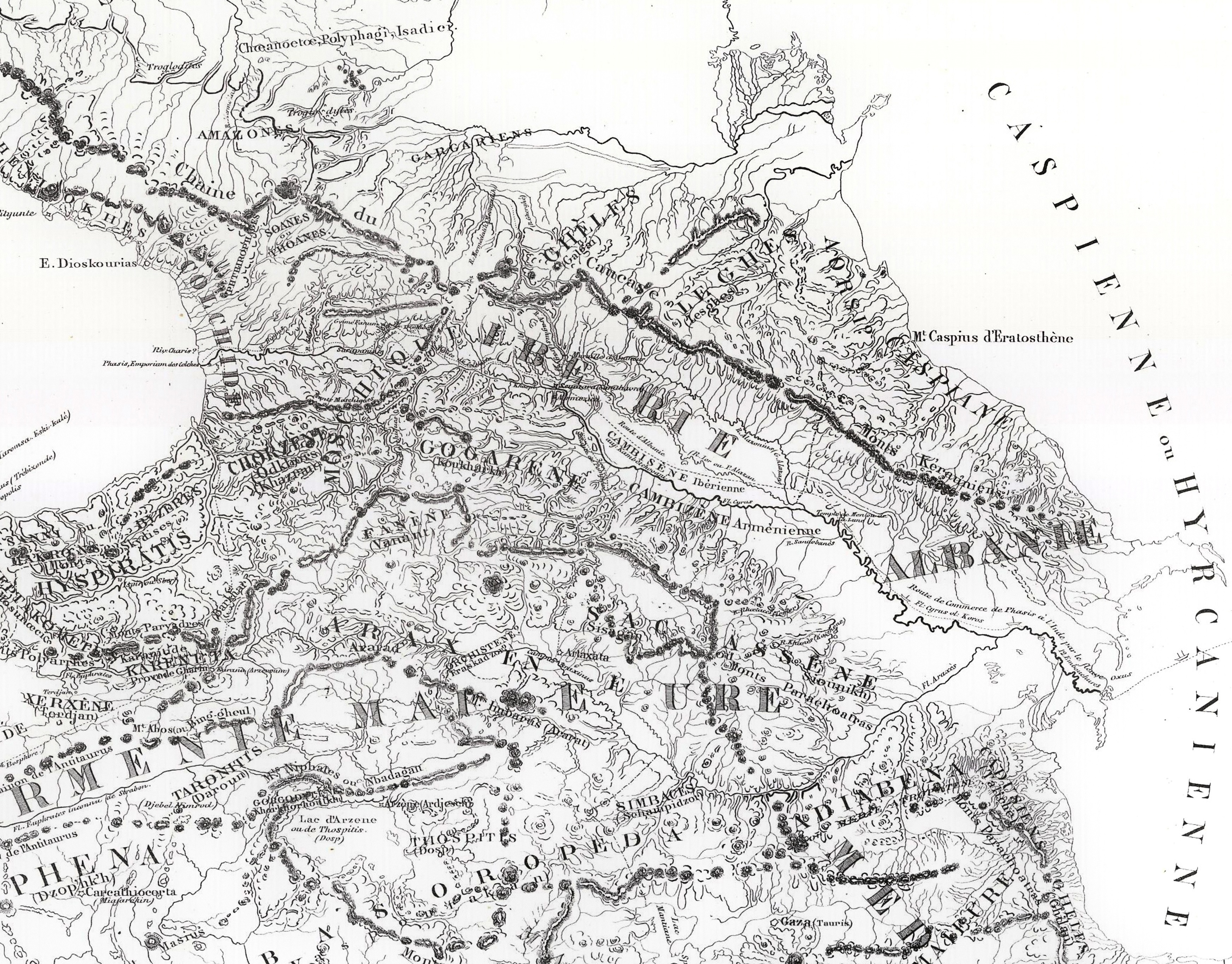
The Caucasus in the 1st century BC according to Strabo.

The Gelae (Ancient Greek: Γῆλαι, Γέλαι, or Γέλοι, Gélai or Géloi ), or Gelians, were a Scythian tribe mentioned by Strabo and other ancient writers as living on the southern shores of the Caspian Sea. The name of the province Gilan might possibly be derived from the Gelae. Another hypothesis held by several historians suggests that the Gelae are equivalent to the Galgai, the ancient neighbours of the Legae (Leks).

== Classical sources ==
Strabo first mentions the Gelae, along with the Legae, in the fifth chapter of the eleventh book of his Geographica, who according to Theophanes of Mytilene, Pompey's compaignon in his Caucasian campaign in the first century BC, lived between the Amazons and the Albanians, thus, were placed in Northern Caucasus. Plutarch specified that the Amazons did not border on the Albanians but were divided by them from the Gelae and Legae. Therefore, they must have been peoples neighbouring the Albanians, but distinct from them.

Strabo's second account of the Gelae, mentions them among the tribes of the southern Caspian which included the Cadusii, Amardi, Witii, and Anariacae, in a manner which does not agree with what he initially says of their position. We must perhaps suppose that this people, in part at least, have changed either changed their place of residence or were perhaps another tribe with a similar name. If, as seems probable, this description accurately represents their distribution from west to east, then the Gelae would have lived directly east of the river Araxes, along the border of Armenia. Their territory is supposed to have been relatively unproductive, of little agricultural or mineral value. Pliny considers the Gelae and the Cadusii to be synonymous, with "Cadusii" being the tribe's name in Greek, and "Gelae" being its eastern equivalent. If he is correct, then it is likely that the name of modern Gilan is derived from the Gelae.

According to the late-classical author Bardaisan, the Gelae (Gilites) who lived along the Caspian, had feminine men and masculine women, like the citizens of Cumae under the tyrant Aristodemus.

Among the Gelae women sow, harvest, build and do all the things that workers do. They wear plain garments, do not wear sandals and make no use of agreeable perfumes. They are not reproached if they fornicate with foreigners or the servants in their household. Gelae men, on the other hand, wear coloured garments and ornaments of gold and precious stones and anoint themselves with agreeable perfumes. They do so not because they are effete but because of a law. The men love hunting and fighting.

== Recent scholarship ==
Modern scholars have developed various hypotheses about the original location, ethnicity, and the language of the Gelae. Arnold Chikobava, Ivane Javakhishvili, William E.D. Allen, Pyotr Butkov, Adolf Bergé, and others, attribute the Gelae to the modern Galgaï (Ingush). Peter von Uslar wrote, that traces of the name of Gelae can be found in northern Dagestan. The connection between the name of Gilan and the Gelae was further discussed by Vasily Bartold and E.A. Grantovsky, who accept Pliny's identification of the Gelae and Cadusii as one people who spoke an ancestral form of the Talysh language, one of the Iranian languages.

== Bibliography ==
- Strabo, Geographica.
- Lucius Mestrius Plutarchus (Plutarch), Lives of the Noble Greeks and Romans.
- Claudius Ptolemaeus (Ptolemy), Geographia.
- Javakhishvili, I. (1937). ქართული ერის ისტორიის შესავალი [Introduction to the history of the Georgian nation] (PDF) (in Georgian). Vol. 2: kartuli da k'avk'asiuri enebis tavdap'irveli buneba da natesaoba. Tbilisi: Ssrk' metsnierebata ak'ademia - sakartvelos piliali. pp. 1–754.
- Чикобава, А.С. (2010). Введение в иберийско-кавказское языкознание [Introduction to Iberian-Caucasian Linguistics] (in Russian). Тбилиси: Тбилисский Гос. Университет им. И. Джаважишвили. Изд. «Универсал».
- Kamilla Trever, "Albania in the IV–II Centuries BCE", in Essays on the History and Culture of Caucasian Albania: IV Century BC–VII Century AD (1959).
- "Onomastics and Epigraphy of Medieval Eastern Europe and Byzantium" (1993), p. 204.
- Naturkunde: Lateinisch-Deutsch, Buch VI, Kai Brodersen, ed., Zürich (1996), p. 184.
- A.K. Alikberov, "To the Sources and Historical Foundations of the Koranic story about Yl'juj, Ma'juj and Zu-l-Karnain", in Ars Islamica: In Honor of Stanislav Mikhailovich Prozorov, Nauka, Moscow (2016), p. 350.
- Allen, W.E.D. (1970). Russian Embassies to the Georgian Kings, 1589–1605. Vol. 2. The Hakluyt Society.
