= Khamkhi =

Rural locality in Ingushetia

Khamkhi Хамхи
- Aul

Other transcription(s)
  - Ingush: Хамхе
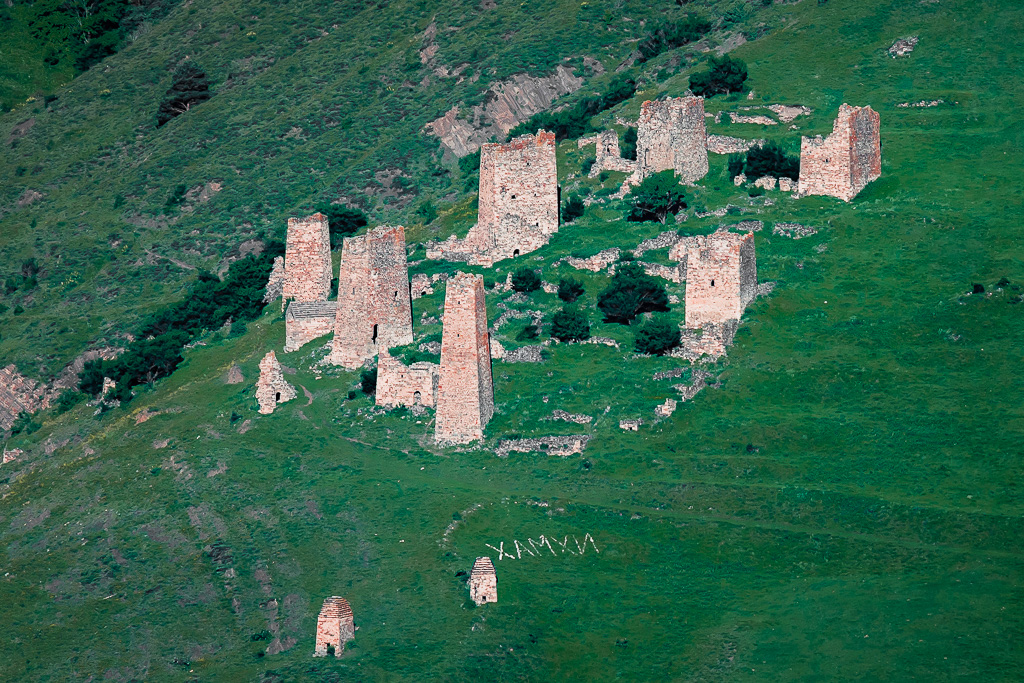
- Interactive map of Khamkhi
- Location of Khamkhi Khamkhi (Republic of Ingushetia)
- Coordinates: 42°49′20″N 44°55′35″E
- Country: Russia
- Federal subject: Ingushetia
- Elevation: 1,230 m (4,040 ft)

Population (2010 Census)
  - Total: 0
  - Estimate (2010): 0 )

Administrative status
  - Subordinated to: Dzheyrakhsky District
- Time zone: UTC+3 (MSK)
- Postal code: 386430
- OKTMO ID: 26620450161

Khamkhi (Ingush: Хамхе, romanized: Khamkhe) is an ancient city-settlement in Dzheyrakhsky District of Ingushetia. It is part of the rural settlement of Guli (administrative center rural settlement).

On the territory of the city-settlement there is an architectural complex "Khamkhi", represented by many historical objects: megalithic cyclopean tower-type dwellings, 4 combat towers, 4 semi-combat and 16 residential towers, as well as 10 crypt burial grounds. Currently, these objects of Ingush architecture and the entire territory of the settlement are included in the Dzheyrakh-Assa Museum-Reserve and are under state protection.

== Geography ==
Khamkhi is located in Mountainous Ingushetia, on the left bank of the Assa river, on the territory of the historical region "Khyakhale" (from the Ingush "three-town"), being one of its three largest ancient cities-settlements.

== History ==
On the territory of Khamkhi, the remains of megalithic cyclopean dwellings dating back to the 2nd-1st millennium BC were recorded. It is here that scientists localized the ancient ethnonym Khamekits, mentioned by the ancient historian and geographer Strabo (transcribing the words "Khamekits" and "Khamkheti" as the "Country of Khamkhs").

In the late Middle Ages, Khamkhi was territorially part of the Khamkhin society as its center. The settlement is ancestral home for the following Ingush teips: Khamkhoevs, Izmailovs, Bekbuzarovs, Martazanovs, Katsievs, Adzhievs, Matsievs, Umarovs, Bersanovs, Fatkhilgovs, Kadievs.

In the second half of the 18th century (1770s), the German researcher J.A. Güldenstädt indicated Targim among the total number of Ingush villages and districts. Khamkhi was mentioned as an Ingush village in 1823 by S. M. Bronevskiy.

== Bibliography ==
- Мальсагов, З. К. (1963). Оздоева, Ф. (ed.). Грамматика ингушского языка [Grammar of the Ingush language] (in Ingush and Russian). Vol. 5 (2nd ed.). Грозный: Чечено-Ингушское Книжное Издательство. pp. 1–164.
- Виноградов, В. Б.; Чокаев, К. З. (1966). Виноградов, В. Б. (ed.). Древние свидетельства о названиях и размещении нахских племён [Ancient evidence of the names and location of the Nakh tribes]. Археолого-этнографический сборник (in Russian). Vol. 7 (1st ed.). Грозный: Чечено-Ингушское книжное издательство. pp. 1–179.
- Смирнов, Н. С., ed. (1967). Очерки истории Чечено-Ингушской АССР [Essays on the history of the Checheno-Ingush ASSR] (in Russian). Vol. 1. Грозный: Чечено-Ингушское книжное издательство. pp. 1–316.
- Крупнов, Е. И. (1971). Средневековая Ингушетия [Medieval Ingushetia] (in Russian). Москва: Наука. pp. 1–211.
- Гюльденштедт, Иоганн Антон (2002). "VI. Провинция Кистия, или Кистетия" [VI. Province of Kistia, or Kistetia]. In Карпов, Ю. Ю. (ed.). Путешествие по Кавказу в 1770-1773 гг. [Journey through the Caucasus in 1770-1773.] (in Russian). Translated by Шафроновской, Т. К. Санкт-Петербург: Петербургское Востоковедение. pp. 238–243. ISBN 5-85803-213-3.
- Броневский, С. М. (1823). "Кисты (глава третья)" [Kists (chapter three)]. Новейшие географические и исторические известия о Кавказе (часть вторая) [The latest geographical and historical news about the Caucasus (part two)] (PDF) (in Russian). Москва: Типография С. Селивановского. pp. 151–186.
- Чахкиев, Д. Ю. (2003). Древности Горной Ингушетии [Antiquities of Mountainous Ingushetia] (in Russian). Vol. 1.
