= Vitii =

Ancient tribe that lived in Caucasian Albania

The Vitii were a tribe that in antiquity lived in the former Caucasus Albania in and around a town now known as Nij in the Qabala district of Azerbaijan. While some scholars believe that the Vitii were indigenous Caucasus Albanians, and possibly ancestral to or neighbours of the Udi people who now live in the Nij area, there are numerous theories suggesting that the Vitii originated with another people who settled in the area in antiquity.

Some scholars consider the Vitii to have originated with a purported ancient Greek settlement. Conversely, V. V. Nikolaev identifies the Vitii with the Gutians, who invaded Bronze Age Sumeria. A third hypothesis, put forward by A. A. Tuallagov, suggests that the Vitii migrated from the territory of the Yuezhi and/or a Tocharian-speaking people, originating in Inner Asia.

The hypothesis of Greek migration appears to have originated with Strabo, who claimed that the Vitii lived in a city founded by part of a tribe known as the Ainianes (Latin: Ainiani), after it had been expelled from Thessaly. Some proponents of this hypothesis suggest that the ethnonym Vitii—and possibly also Udi—originated with the Ainianes. (There may be limited supporting evidence for this from Armenian sources, which refer to the area in question as Otena.) Strabo also claims that some of the Vitii lived to the north of Caucasus Albania, on the shores of the Caspian Sea. According to Pliny, the Vitii and other Caucasus Albanians made up the majority of the population in the territory of the Scythian kingdom of Sakasene, which was centred on the later area around Nagorno-Karabakh. Similarly, Igor M. Diakonoff claims that some of the Udi were part of Iškuza, a wider part of Scythia, which included the later Sakasene kingdom.
