= Galgai-Yurt =

Former village in Chechnya

Galgai-Yurt Галгай-Юрт
- Village

Other transcription(s)
  - Ingush: ГIалгIай-Юрт
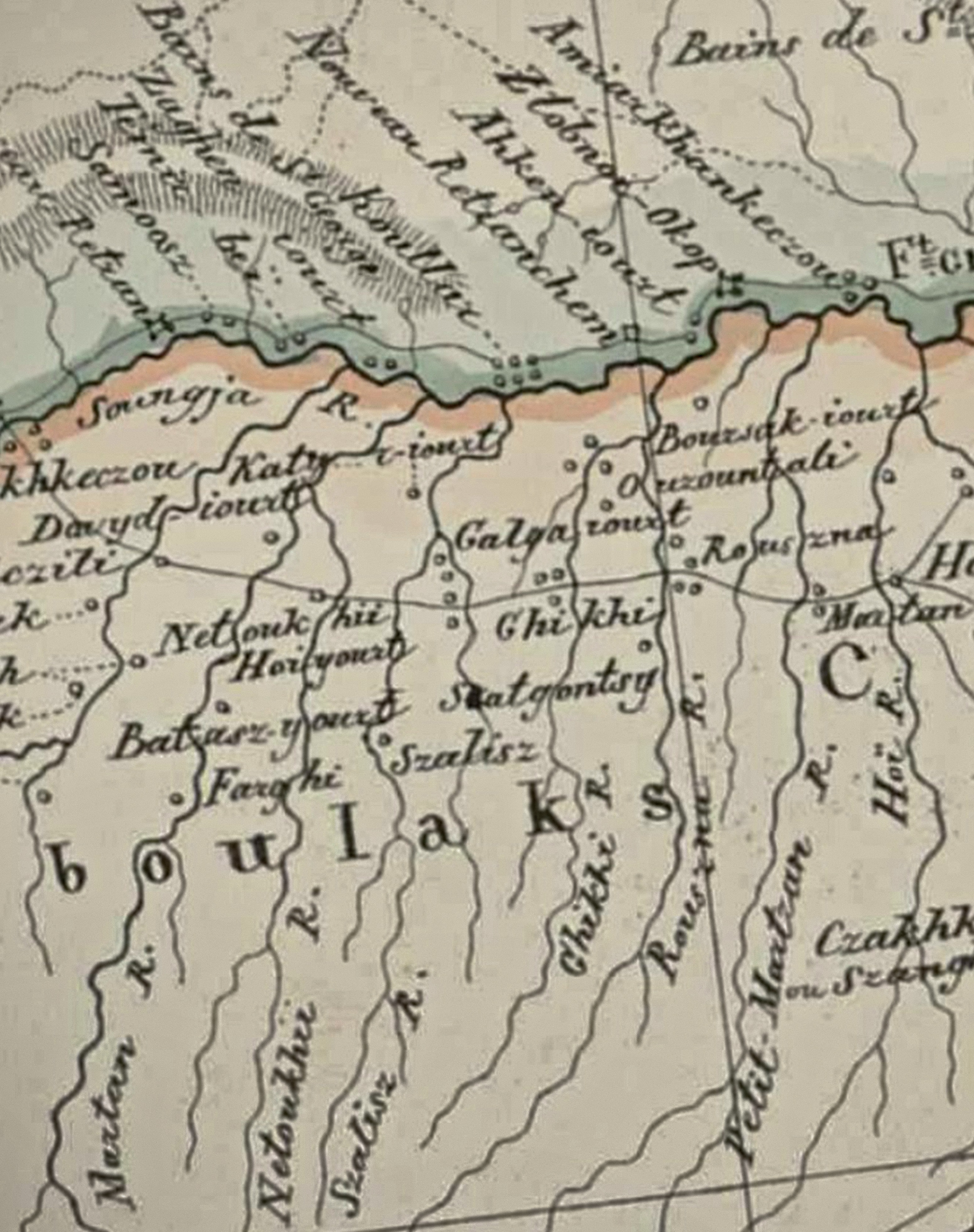
- Galgai-Yurt on major-general Aleksander Khatow's map in 1826.
- Interactive map of Galgai-Yurt
- Location of Galgai-Yurt Galgai-Yurt (Chechnya)
- Coordinates: 43°11′58″N 45°24′31″E
- Country: Russia
- Federal subject: Chechnya

Galgai-Yurt (Ingush: ГIалгIай-Юрт, romanized: Ghalghai-Yurt) was a village (khutor) that was located in modern day Valerik in the Chechen Republic, Russia.

== Etymology ==
Galgai-Yurt combines the words Ghalghaï, the self-name of the Ingush people, and yurt, which means "village" in Vainakh languages.

== History ==
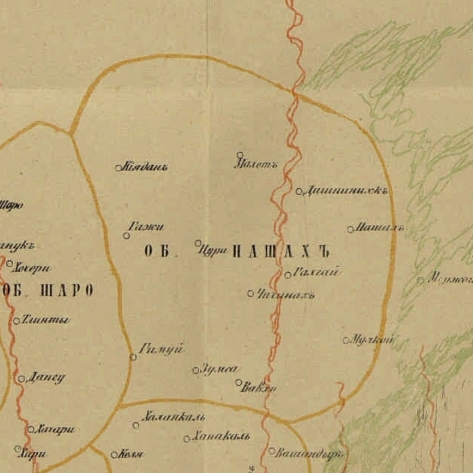
Galgai-Yurt as a part of the Nashakh Naibdom on an 1856 map.

During his expedition in the Caucasus Mountains in the 1830s, lieutenant-general Johann Blaramberg mentions Galgai-Yurt as Galga situated on the river Valerik. On 7 November of 1833, Major General of the Russian Imperial Army, Engelgardt A. G. led a punitive expedition to the un-ruly village Galgai-Yurt which ended successfully for the Russian Empire. The village was wiped out in 1833, after another punitive expedition of Russian Empire, led by baron Rozen. In 1847, head of the Achkhoevsky Garrison and lieutenant colonel Preobrazhenskiy led a punitive expedition to Galgai-Yurt to punish the villagers for their un-ruliness which ended as a success for the Russian Empire. The village was mentioned as inhabited in map of Little Chechnya and Vladikavkazsky Okrug in 1848. Galgai-Yurt was also mentioned on the map of Caucasian Imamate dated 27 Muharram 1273 (1856 in Gregorian calendar) as part of Nashkhoy District. In 1859, caucasologist and military-historian Adolf Berge in his principal work Chechenya and Chechens mentioned Galgai-Yurt as well, as part of the village of Valerik. He also mentioned that the Galgai-Yurt existed up until 1846.

== Bibliography ==
- Берже, А. П. (1859). Чечня и чеченцы [Chechnya and Chechens] (in Russian). Тифлис: Типография Главного Управления Наместника Кавказского. pp. 1–141.
- Сулейманов, А. С. (1980). Топонимия Чечено-Ингушетии. Часть 3. Предгорная равнина [Toponymy of Checheno-Ingushetia. Part 3. Piedmont plain] (in Russian). Грозный: Чечено-Ингушское Книжное Издательство. pp. 1–224.
- Бларамберг, И. Ф. (2010). Историческое, топографическое, статистическое, этнографическое и военное описание Кавказа [Historical, topographical, statistical, ethnographic and military description of the Caucasus] (field research) (in Russian). Translated by Назарова, И. М. Москва: Издательство Надыршин. pp. 1–402. ISBN 978-5-902744-10-8.
