= Legae =

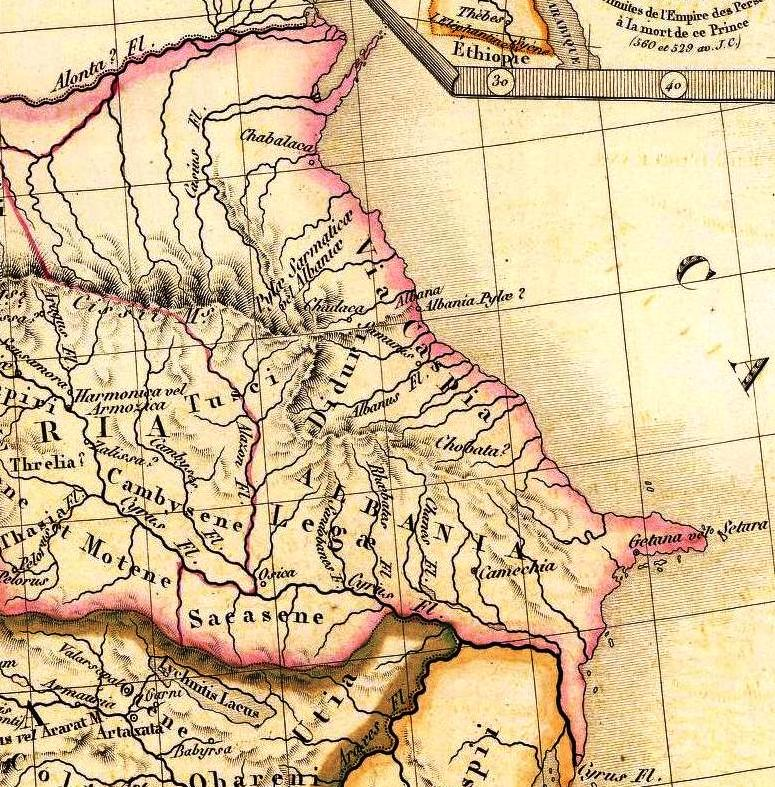
Legae

The Legae (Latin legae Greek Λῆγαι) were a people on the shores of the Caspian Sea that mythology places between Albania and the country of the Amazons, Scythian roots. The name survives today in the name of the Lezgins, who live in Kura and northern Azerbaijan.

Strabo referring to Theophanes of Mytilene, Pompey's companion in his Caucasian campaign (1st century BC), that "between the Amazons and Albanians live the Gelae and Legae - the Scythians"

Ptolemy in Geography (Book VI) identifies the Cadusii and Legae, and places the Gelae to the north. Comparing all the fragments that have come down, Kai Brodersen suggests that in Pliny's text the word "legae" could have disappeared when copied. That is, the original fragment was read as gelae, legae - which the Greeks called Cadusii.

Peter Uslar identifies ancient leks with modern Lezgins: “Lezgins, leagues, leks gave their name to the mountain range separating the Kura basin from the Rion basin. Colchis was sometimes even called by poets Ligistika, that is, the country of leagues. It is very likely that the leagues that Herodotus speaks of were Lezgi people ”. According to the Brockhaus and Efron Encyclopedic Dictionary, published in the late 19th - early 20th centuries, varnishes (that is, the Laks) are “classic legi (Λήγες), at the end of the 8th century. They were conquered by the Arab commander Abumuslim, who established Islam among them and gave their country to be ruled by one of the descendants of the prophet, Shah-Baal, who received the title of shamkhal and wali (that is, governor) of Dagestan ”.
