= Dolakovo =

Rural locality in Nazranovsky District

Dolakovo Долаково
- Village
- Location within Republic of Ingushetia Location within Russia
- Coordinates: 43°14′N 44°35′E
- Country: Russia
- Region: Republic of Ingushetia
- District: Nazranovsky District
- Time zone: UTC+3:00

Dolakovo (Russian: Долаково) is a rural locality (a village) in Nazranovsky District, Republic of Ingushetia, Russia. Population:6,813 (2021 census);

== Geography ==
This rural locality is located 14 kilometres (8.7 mi) from Nazran (the district's administrative centre), 19 kilometres (12 mi) from Magas (capital of Republic of Ingushetia) and 1,503 kilometres (934 mi) from Moscow. Kantyshevo is the nearest rural locality.
