= Kalkans =

Ethnonym of the Ingush, mentioned in Russian sources of 16-17th centuries

Kalkans, Kolkans, Kalki, Kolki, Kalkan people — ethnonym of the Ingush used in Russian sources of the 16th-17th centuries. The ethnonym corresponds to the self-name of the Ingush - Ghalghaï.

== History ==
Kalkans are first mentioned in the second half of the 16th century in numerous reports of attacks done on Russian ambassador armies in Darial Gorge by Kalkans. The earliest mention of Kalkans can be found in 1590 article list of knyaz of Zvenigorod and diak of Torkh, when the Kolkans attacked Russian ambassador army.

Historical mentions
Name	Source	Date	Refs
Kolkans	Article list	1590	
Kalkans	Document	1604	
Kalkan mountains	Document	1604	
Kalkan kabaks	Document	1614	
Kalkan mountain lands	Reportage	1619	
Kolkan lands	Chelobitnaya of Okoks	1621	
Kolkan lands	Reportage of 2 Kabardian knyazes	1621	
Kalkani	Document	1637	

== Bibliography ==
- Волкова, Н. Г. (1973). Этнонимы и племенные названия Северного Кавказа [Ethnonyms and tribal names of the North Caucasus] (in Russian). Москва: Наука. pp. 1–210.
- Богуславский, В. В. (2004). Славянская энциклопедия: XVII век [Slavic Encyclopedia: XVII century] (in Russian). Vol. 1. Москва: Олма-Пресс. pp. 1–782. ISBN 5224036593.
- Кушева, Е. Н. (1963). Народы Северного Кавказа и их связи с Россией (вторая половина XVI — 30-е годы XVII века) [The peoples of the North Caucasus and their relations with Russia (the second half of the 16th - 30s of the 17th century)] (in Russian). Москва: Издательство Академии наук СССР. pp. 1–370.
- Белокуров, М. А. (1889). Сношения России с Кавказом. 1578-1613 гг. [Relations between Russia and the Caucasus. 1578-1613] (in Russian) (1st ed.). Москва: Университетская типография, Страстной бульвар. pp. 1–715.
