= Tarskoye =

Rural locality in North Ossetia–Alania, Russia

Tarskoye Angusht
- Settlement
- Location within North Ossetia–Alania Location within Republic of Ingushetia Location within Russia
- Coordinates: 42°57′52″N 44°46′16″E
- Country: Russia
- Region: North Ossetia-Alania
- District: Prigorodny District
- Time zone: UTC+3:00

Tarskoye, (Note: Russian: Тарское; Iron Ossetic: Тарскæй, romanized: Tarskæy) formerly known as Angusht or Ongusht, (Note: Russian: Ангушт/Онгушт; Ingush: Ангуштӏе/Онгуштӏе.) is a rural locality (a selo) in Prigorodny District of the Republic of North Ossetia–Alania, Russia. Population: 3,845 (2010 census); 4,371 (2002 census);

== Nomenclature ==
The modern name "Tarskoye", is derived from the name of the village Tarshoy-Yurt in the lowland of Ingushetia. The toponym "Angusht" itself is a composition of three Ingush words: an ("plain") or ane ("horizon"), gush ("visible") and the suffix of place - tĕ (indication of position or location), literally translating as a "place where the plain is seen".

== History ==
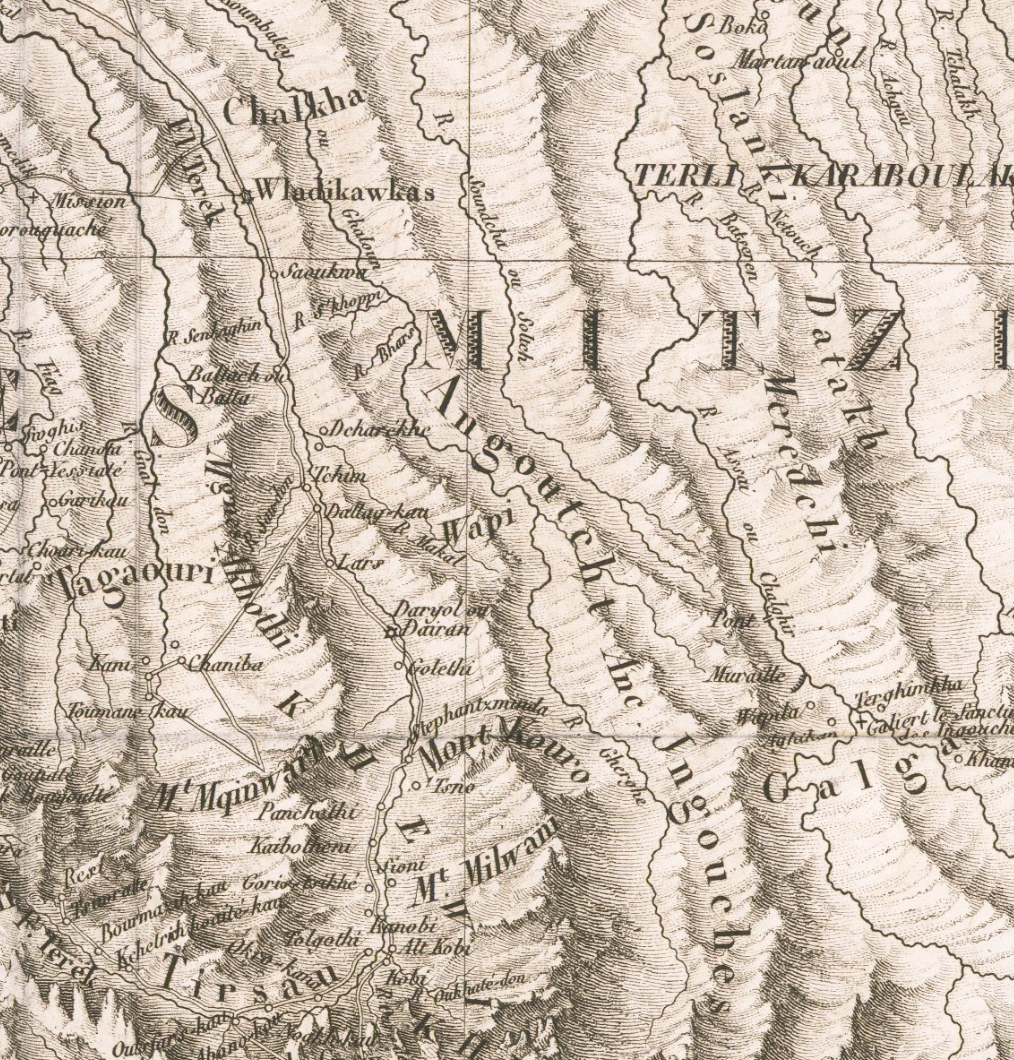
Angusht illustrated on Julius von Klaproth's map. Early 19th century.

Angusht was built no later than the 17th century and the first report of it was made in 1745 by prince Vakhushti of Kartli who mentioned Angusht as a village located on the river Boragnis-tskali (Sunzha). He also noted that the inhabitants of Angusht are Sunni Muslims. There is no exact data about the time of foundation of the village. It is known that Angusht was not originally a single village, but was a territorial society, consisting of several small tribal villages. In 1845, the settlement of the banks along the Sunzha River by the Terek Cossacks began. The foundation of the Tarskaya stanitsa is associated with the emergence of the Sunzha Line. The stanitsa was built on the site of Ingush lands as fixated by Nikolay Zeidlits in 1873, mentioned in his letter to the government published in the scientific journal «News of the Caucasian Department of the Imperial Russian Geographical Society» in 1894:

“Accompanied by a quide from captain Lakhanin, and Cossack horses, at noon we headed towards the south through the gorge of the river Kambileyevka, to the Tarskaya stanitsa. This military settlement of 1,5 thousand people, is occupied a vast basin, irrigated by countless creeks of the river Kambileyevka. Before the conquest of the region, this forest slum was occupied by the Ingush, who were evicted from here to protect the environs of Vladikavkaz. The many stone towers scattered throughout the valley still testify to the former inhabitants of this area, which is not very suitable for arable farming due to the constant rains.”

— Н.К. Зейдлиц, «Известия Кавказского отдела Императорского Русского географического общества Том II. Изд II.» 1894 г. / с. 158-159

== Notable people ==
- Issa Kodzoev (born 1938), writer, poet, and politician
- Yunus-bek Yevkurov (born 1963), military officer and politician

== Sources ==
=== Russian sources ===
- Bagrationi, Vakhushti (1904). География Грузии [Geography of Georgia] (in Russian). Translated by Janashvili, Mose. Tiflis: Typography of K. P. Kozlovsky. pp. 1–290.
- Kodzoev, Nurdin (2020). Ингушские населенные пункты: Ангушт [Ingush settlements: Angusht] (in Russian). Nazran: OOO "Kep". pp. 1–64. ISBN 978-5-4482-0066-3.
- Krupnov, Evgeny (1971). Средневековая Ингушетия [Medieval Ingushetia] (in Russian). Moscow: Nauka. pp. 1–211.
- Kurkiev, Alimbek (1979). Основные вопросы лексикологии ингушского языка [The main questions of the lexicology of the Ingush language] (in Russian). Grozny: Checheno-Ingush Book Publishing House. pp. 1–254.
- Martirosian, Georgi (1933). История Ингушии [History of Ingushiya] (in Russian). Ordzhonikidze: Serdalo.
- Союз горцев Кавказа в ЧСР (1924). "Кавказский горец" [Caucasian highlander] (in Russian) (1). Прага: Издание Союза горцев Кавказа в ЧСР: 3–79.
