= Gargareans =

All-male tribe in Greek mythology

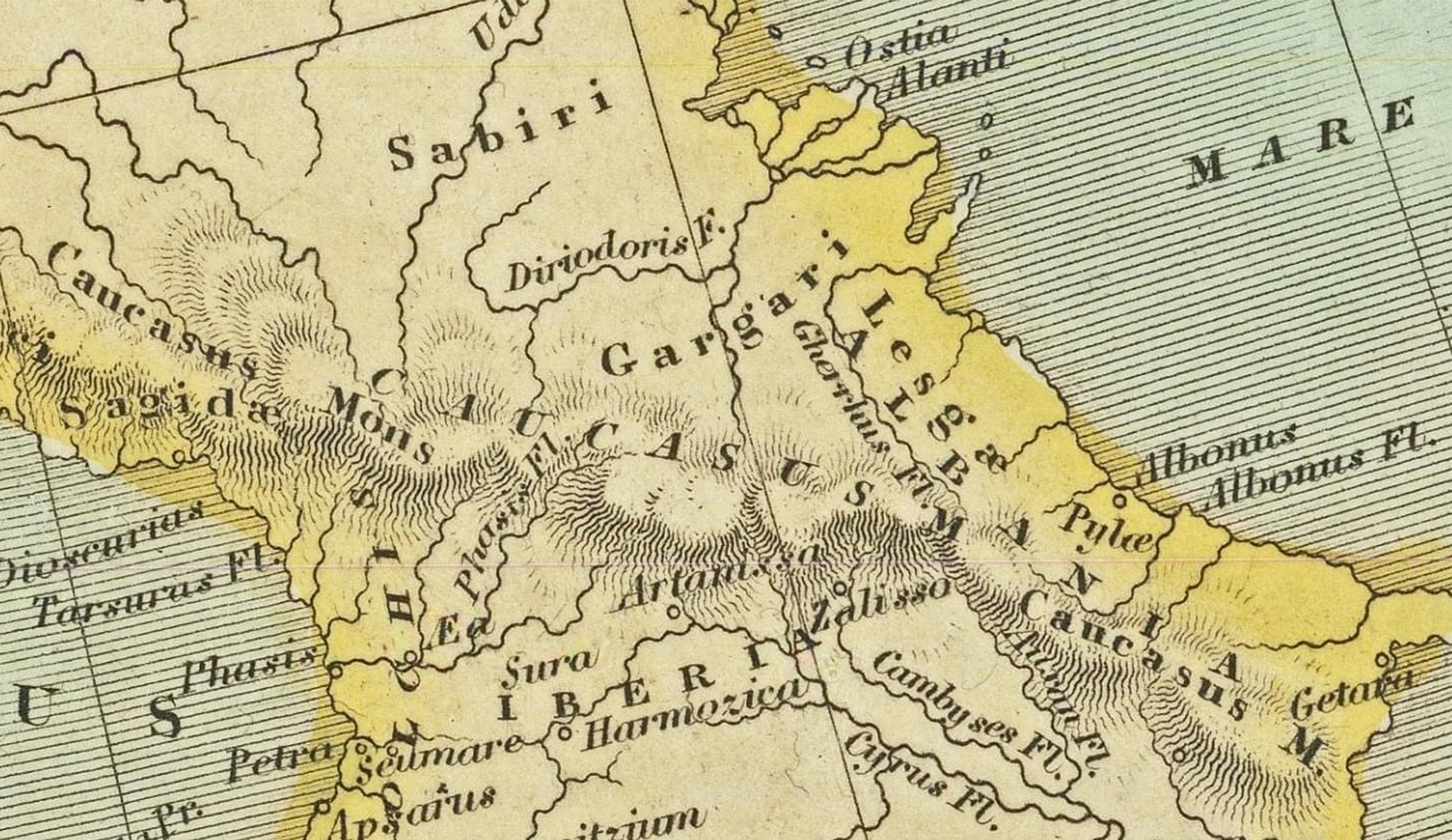
Gargareans (Gargari) in the North Caucasus on a fragment of Henry Teesdale's map of the Ancient Roman Empire.

In Greek mythology, the Gargareans, or Gargarenses, (Greek: Γαργαρείς Gargareis) were an all-male tribe. They copulated with the Amazons annually in order to keep both tribes reproductive. The Amazons kept the female children, raising them as warriors, and gave the males to the Gargareans. According to K. V. Trever, it is possible that the "Amazons" mentioned by ancient authors are a distorted ethnic term, "Alazons," meaning the inhabitants of the area along the Alazani River, among whom vestiges of matriarchy may have persisted somewhat longer than among other Caucasian peoples.

According to the ancient Greek geographer Strabo, the Gargareans, who originally inhabited Themiscyra along with the Amazons before they split, with the help of the Thracians and Euboeans declared war on the Amazons; the conflict ended in a pact between the two peoples, namely, that there should be a companionship only with respect to offspring, and that they should live each independent of the other.

Strabo placed the Gargareans on the northern foothills of the Caucasus. Gaius Plinius Secundus likewise localizes the Gargareans north of the Caucasus Mountains, but calls them Gegar. Some scholars identify the Gargareans with the Rutulians. Other scholars identify them with the Galgaï. According to E. Krupnov, the accuracy of the localization of Strabo's Gargareans in Galga-chuv (Ingushetia) is confirmed by archaeological, anthropological and ethnographic data.

In the 2nd century BC the Gargareans inhabited the right bank of the Kura River, at the time when the Armenian king Artaxias I incorporated the area into the Armenian kingdom. The Gargareans, together with the locally settled tribes of the Shaki and the Utii, being politically fragmented, were unable to resist the seizure of their lands. In the 3rd century AD the Gargareans are reported to have moved down from the Caucasus foothills into the lowland region (the area corresponding to the modern Karabakh steppe); according to Kamilla Trever, some of them may have remained there permanently.
