= Gligvi =

Medieval ethnonym for Ingush, used mainly in Georgian sources

Gligvi (Georgian: ღლიღვი, romanized: ghlighvi) is a medieval ethnonym used in Georgian, Russian and Western European sources in the 11-19 centuries. The ethnonym corresponds to the self-name of the Ingush, Ghalghaï.

== History ==
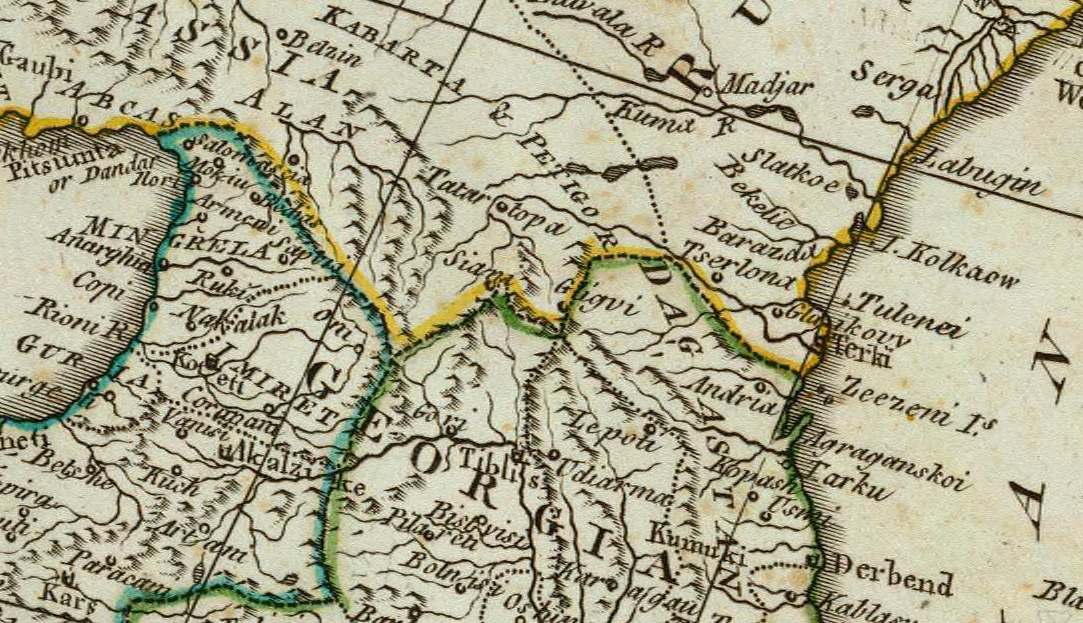
Gligvi (Ghalghaï) on a map in 1787

Gligvi are mentioned in Georgian sources as an ethnonym that existed during the reign of Mirian I in II century BC, as well as the ruler of Kakheti Kvirike III i.e. in XI century. Gligvi were also mentioned in a document of King Vakhtang VI in 1729. Prince Vakhushti of Kartli wrote that the country of Dzurdzuketi (Durdzuketi) consists of Kisti, Dzurdzuki and Gligvi, of which the latter are located the more east of the three, i.e. north of Tusheti.

== Bibliography ==
- Klaproth, Heinrich Julius (1814). Geographisch-historische Beschreibung des östlichen Kaukasus, zwischen den Flüssen Terek, Aragwi, Kur und dem Kaspischen Meere [Geographical-historical description of the Eastern Caucasus, between the rivers Terek, Aragvi, Kur and the Caspian Sea] (in German). Vol. 50. Part 2. Weimar: Verlag des Landes-Industrie-Comptoirs. pp. 1–218. Archived from the original on 2023-03-12.
- Волкова, Н. Г. (1973). Этнонимы и племенные названия Северного Кавказа [Ethnonyms and tribal names of the North Caucasus] (in Russian). Москва: Наука. pp. 1–210. Archived from the original on 2023-02-11.
- Бердзенешвили, Н. А.; Дондуа, В. Д.; Думбадзе, М. К.; Меликишвили, Г. А.; Месхиа, Ш. А. (1962). История Грузии: с древнейших времён до 60-х годов XIX века [History of Georgia: from ancient times to the 60s of the XIX century] (in Russian). Тбилиси: Издательство учебно-педагогической литературы. pp. 1–254. Archived from the original on 2023-04-01.
- Джанашвили, М. Г. (1897). Известия грузинских летописей и историков о Северном Кавказе и России [Bulletin of Georgian chronicles and historians about the North Caucasus and Russia] (in Russian). Тифлис: Типография К.П. Козловского. Головинский пр.. № 12. pp. 1–209. Archived from the original on 2023-03-15.
- Сотавов, Н. А.; Мейер, М. С. (1991). Северный Кавказ в русско-иранских и русско-турецких отношениях в XVIII в. [North Caucasus in Russian-Iranian and Russian-Turkish relations in the XVIII century.] (in Russian). Москва: Наука. pp. 1–221.
- Волкова, Н. Г.; Анчабадзе, Ю. Д. (1993). Симченко, Ю. Б. (ed.). Народы Кавказа [Peoples of the Caucasus] (in Russian). Москва: ИЭИА. pp. 1–265. ISSN 0868-586X. Archived from the original on 2022-11-29.
