= Theophanes of Mytilene =

1st century BC Greek historian and friend of Pompey

Theopanes Pompeius
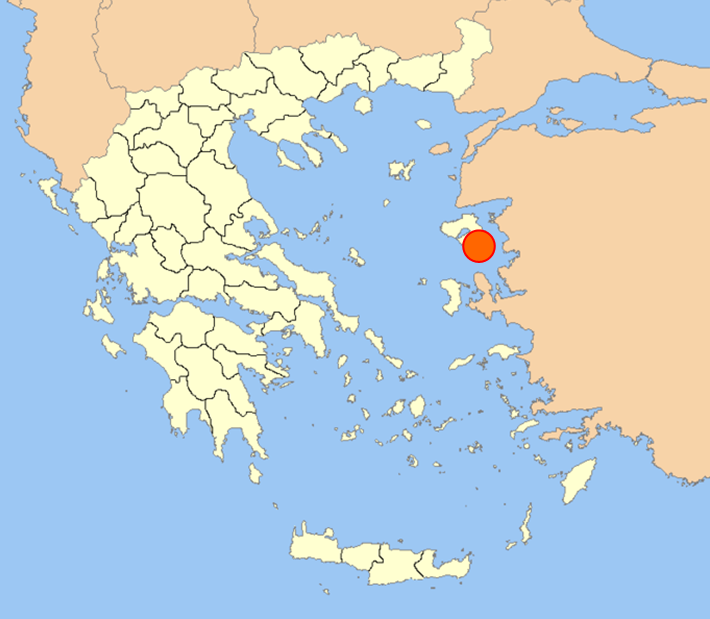
- Location of Mytilene today, on the Greek island of Lesbos
- Born: Not known Mytilene
- Died: Not known Rome
- Other names: Theophanes of Mytilene
- Occupation(s): Political advisor Historian
- Notable work: A history of Pompey's campaigns

Theophanes of Mytilene (Ancient Greek: Θεοφάνης ὁ Μυτιληναῖος) was an intellectual and historian from the town of Mytilene on the island of Lesbos who lived in the middle of the 1st century BC. He was a friend of Pompey and wrote an adulatory history of the latter's expedition to Asia. According to Plutarch, Pompey granted privileges to Mytilene for Theophanes' sake. The people of Mytilene commemorated him as a hero after his death.

== Early life ==
Theophanes was from the town of Mytilene on the island of Lesbos and lived in the middle of the 1st century BC. He played a leading role in resisting Mithridates VI of Pontus on Lesbos in the 80s BC. He met Pompey, the successful, young, Roman general who was nicknamed "the Great" (Magnus), when the latter was using Mytilene as a naval base against pirates in 67 BC, and became a member of his retinue.

== Pompey's protégé ==
Theophanes was one of the most intimate friends of Pompey, whom he accompanied in many of his campaigns, and who frequently followed his advice on public as well as private matters.

He was one of a group of cultured Greeks who accompanied Roman imperatores on their campaigns and acted as guides to an unfamiliar world, advisers, and sometimes chroniclers or panegyrists.

Pompey held Theopanes in such high esteem that he presented him with Roman citizenship in the presence of his army, after a speech he eulogising his merits. Theopanes was appointed praefectus fabrum, or chief-of-staff, to Pompey. Around 62 BC Theophanes took the name of Pompeius after his patron. Such was his influence with Pompey that, in the course of the same year, he obtained for his native city the privileges of a free state, although it had espoused the cause of Mithridates VI of Pontus, and had given up the Roman general, Manlius Aquillius, to Pontus.

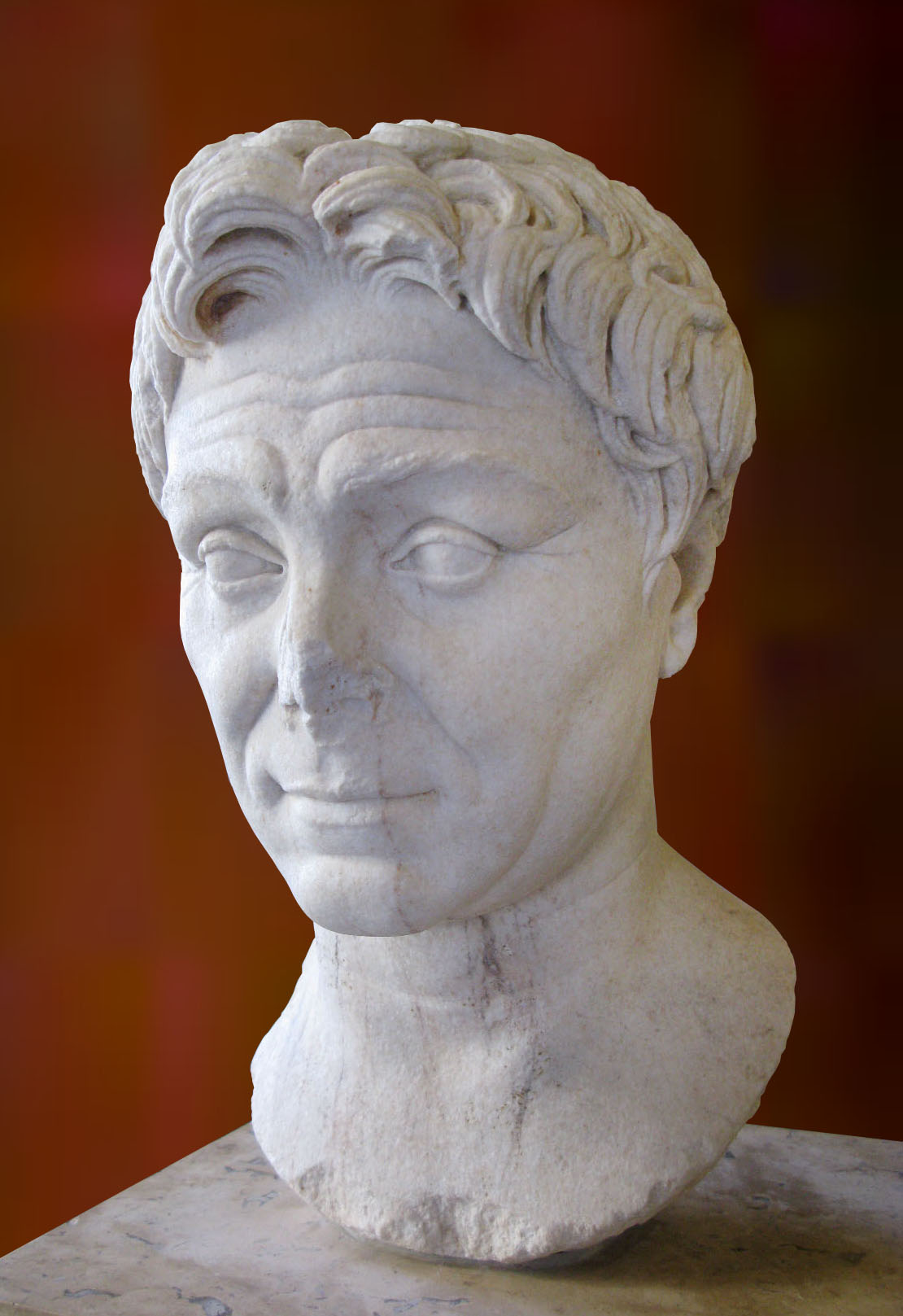
Bust of Pompey

Theophanes came to Rome with Pompey after the conclusion of the wars in the east. There he adopted Lucius Cornelius Balbus, of Gades, a favourite of his patron. He continued to live in Pompey's household on close terms, and we see from Cicero's letters that his society was courted by many of the Roman nobles, on account of his well-known influence with Pompey. When the civil war broke out he accompanied Pompey to Greece, where Pompey appointed him commander of the Fabri, and consulted him and Lucceius on all important matters in the war, much to the indignation of the Roman nobles. After the Battle of Pharsalus Theophanes fled with Pompey from Greece, and it was owing to his advice that Pompey went to Egypt, where he was killed. After the death of Pompey, Theophanes took refuge in Italy. He was pardoned by Julius Caesar, and was still alive in 44 BC, as evidenced by one of Cicero's letters.

== History of Pompey's campaigns ==
Theophanes wrote the history of Pompey's campaigns. He represented the exploits of his hero in the most favourable light, and did not hesitate, as Plutarch more than hints, to invent a false tale for the purpose of injuring the reputation of an enemy of the Pompeian family.

== Death ==
Theophanes died in Rome, some time after 44 BC. After his death the Lesbians paid divine honours to his memory. Theophanes left behind him a son, Marcus Pompeius Theophanes, whom Augustus sent to Asia in the capacity of procurator, and at the time that Strabo wrote the younger Theophanes was one of the friends of Tiberius. The latter emperor, however, put his descendants to death towards the end of his reign, in AD 33, because their ancestor had been one of Pompey's friends, and had received after his death divine honours from the Lesbians. The people of Mytilene commemorated Theophanes as a hero after his death and put his portrait on their bronze coins. From the likeness a marble portrait of the man has been identified as well as dozens of his images in relief on the bottom of special bowls perhaps made to celebrate his posthumous status. Excavations both in the Castle of Mytilene and elsewhere in the town have uncovered a variety of them.
