= Mose Janashvili =

Georgian historian, ethnographer, and linguist

Mose Janashvili

Mose Janashvili (Georgian: მოსე ჯანაშვილი) (19 March 1855 – 19 April 1934) was a Georgian historian, ethnographer, and linguist. He was born into a Georgian Ingilo community at Qakh (now Azerbaijan). Educated at Tbilisi and Kutaisi, he worked as a teacher for several years, from 1875 to 1920, and later served as a professor at the Tbilisi State University. He mostly engaged in study of medieval Georgian chronicles and hagiographic literature. As a linguist, Janashvili subscribed to the theory that linked Georgian with the Indo-European languages. He is buried at Mtatsminda Pantheon in Tbilisi.
