= Ingush tower =

Ingush architecture

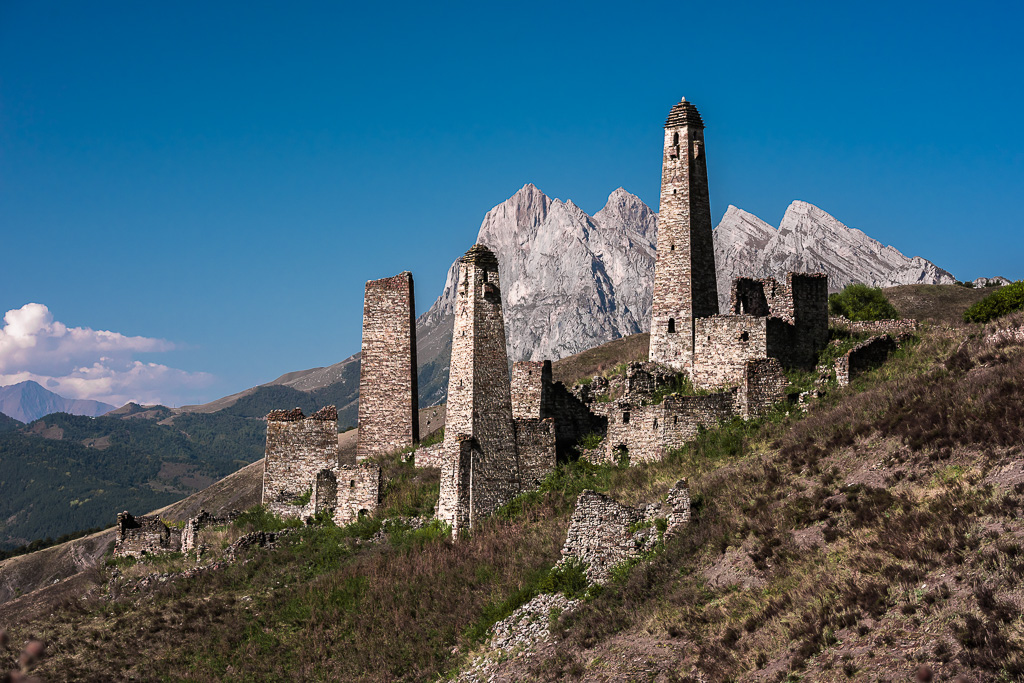
Ingush tower complex in Pyaling

Ingush towers (Ingush: гӀалгӀай гӀалаш/вӀовнаш, romanized: ghalghai ghālash/vhóvnash) (Note: ghālash (sing. ghāla) refer to residential towers, while vhóvnash (sing. vhóv) refer to combat towers.) are medieval Ingush stone structures used as residences, signal posts, and fortifications. Most are found in the Sunzhensky and Dzheyrakhsky Districts of Ingushetia in the North Caucasus.

Tower-building in the North Caucasus originated as early as the first or second millennium BC. Remains of megalithic cyclopean dwellings are found near ancient Ingush villages, including Targim, Khamkhi, Egikal, Doshkhakle, and Kart.

Tower building was revived during the Middle Ages, especially in the mountains of Ingushetia, which became known as the "land of towers", and where most of the existing towers date from the 13th to the 17th centuries.

In 2022 the region's tourism committee received a patent from the Russian Federal Service for Intellectual Property for the slogan "Ingushetia — Homeland of Towers". Public access to some towers is limited due to remoteness, and many towers have suffered significant damage from invasions starting with the Tsardom of Russia and the Russian conquest of the Caucasus, up to the deportation of the Chechens and Ingush from 1944 to 1957, which destroyed many historical monuments.

== Origins and development ==
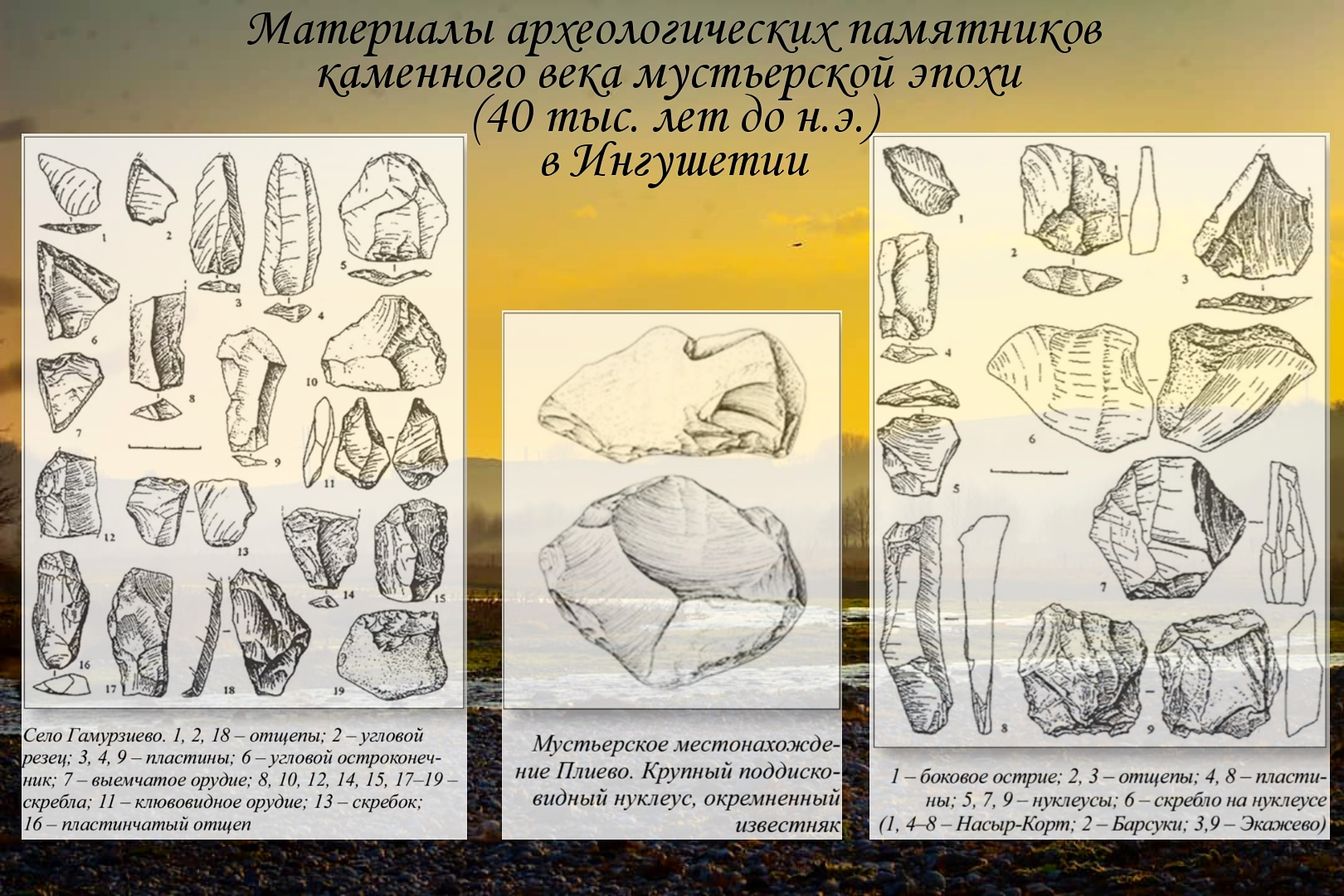
Materials of archaeological monuments of the Mousterian period found in Ingushetia.

The remains of megalithic cyclopean buildings made of large stone slabs and blocks without mortar are found in mountainous Ingushetia, which scientists date to at least the Neolithic, or last Stone Age period, at least 4500 BC. These buildings were usually erected as fortifications in front of cave entrances or around dwellings. They were replaced by stone and mortar structures. Rounder river stones were more difficult to bond with mortar and rarely used.

The Ingush Koban tribes of the North Caucasus built stone towers at the end of the first to second millennium BC. Remains of ceramics dating to the 1st millennium BC, the period of the Koban culture, were found at several megalithic dwellings.

=== Design continuity over time ===
Based on their layout, masonry technique and other features, cyclopean buildings have common features with the later towers in mountainous Ingushetia. Researchers note the continuity of the tower architecture of the Ingush, which was highly developed in the Middle Ages, from the stone construction technique that existed in the mountains of the Central Caucasus since the ancient period.

=== Middle Ages revival ===
Tower culture was revived in the North Caucasus during the Middle Ages, finding its highest quantity and quality in the mountains of Ingushetia. This locus of development, combined with the ethnogenetic traditions of the region's inhabitants and architectural continuity, have led some researchers to believe that the Ingush's ancestors were the group that built towers in the mountainous regions covering modern Ingushetia, Chechnya, North Ossetia and Eastern Georgia.

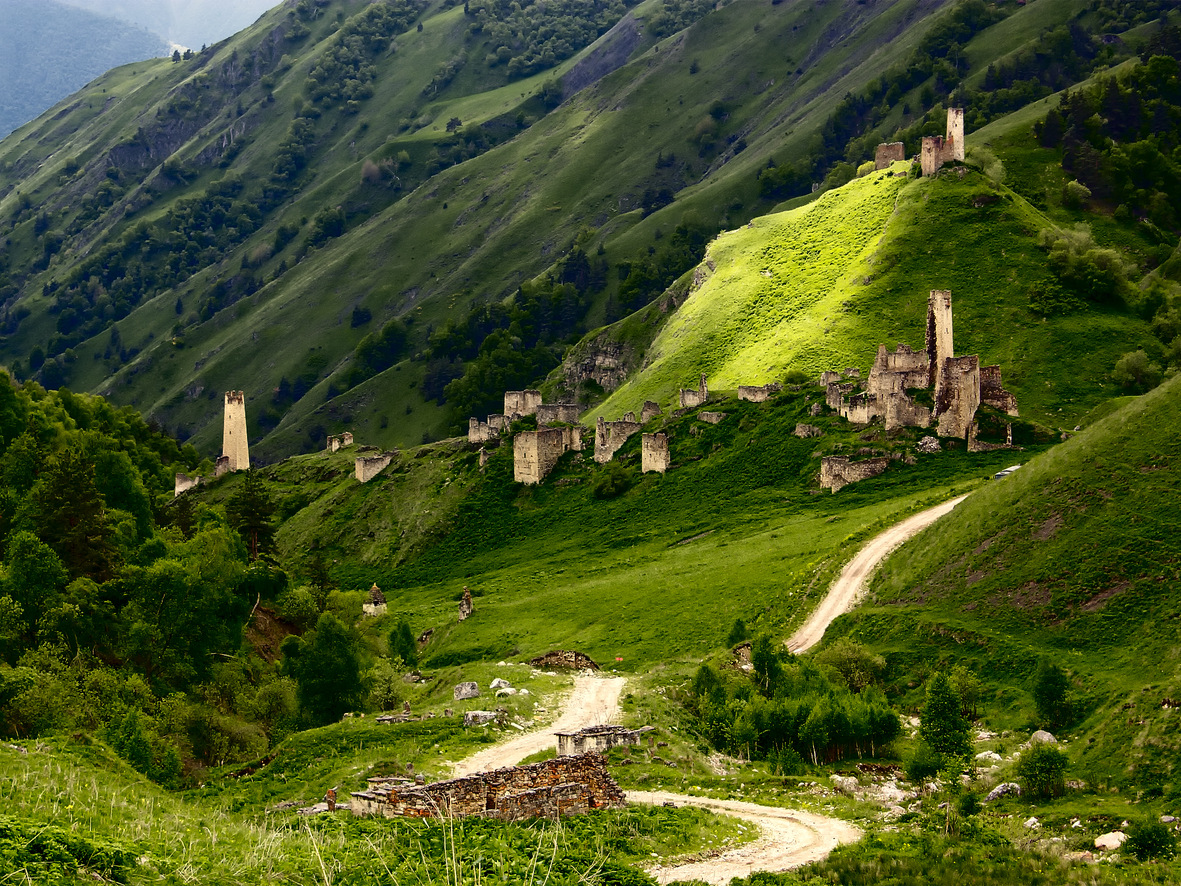
Tower settlement at Tsori

There are about 150 tower settlements (auls) in Dzheyrakhsky District, and most contain semi-combat and combat towers. Many villages were fortified with towers linked by high stone defensive walls. The combat towers reach a thickness of one meter at the base when combined with walls, which reflects the high level of development of medieval Ingush architecture, and the regularity of warfare including invasion, internecine conflicts, and control of the routes between the South Caucasus and plains of the North Caucasus.

The settlements evolved into fortresses as their populations grew. Each settlement resembled a small "medieval city", a self-sufficient entity inhabited by close relatives from one or more clans (teips.) Authority was vested in elected elders who were subject to popular law (adat) and handled foreign relations. The interests of "free and equal citizens" was reflected in policy. Settlements in a mountain gorge could form "federations of towns and villages". The largest settlement, or the one best placed geographically to control the pass, acted as a capital.

=== Distinct Ingush style ===
Compared to towers from neighboring cultures, the architectural style of Ingush towers is notable for its grace and use of masonry for small details including horse feeders built into walls and fences, hitching posts protruding like reels, and window canopies. Ingush towers also have high height to base width ratios, on the order of 10:1.

In 1931, Ukrainian traveller and explorer M. Kegeles wrote:

From the ancient monuments that have been preserved here, it is obvious how talented and gifted the Ingush are. These people, who knew nothing of the alphabet, at a time when Moscow was still a village, were already building high stone towers on rocks, 26 or more meters high. We can say that the first skyscrapers did not appear in America, but here, in the Caucasus Mountains.

Soviet archaeologist and historian Evgeny Krupnov wrote in his "Medieval Ingushetia":

The Ingush battle towers can truly be recognized as the pinnacle of architectural and constructional mastery of the ancient population of the region. They amaze with their simplicity of form, monumentality and strict elegance. . . . The Ingush towers for their time were a true miracle of human genius.

== Construction and mastery ==
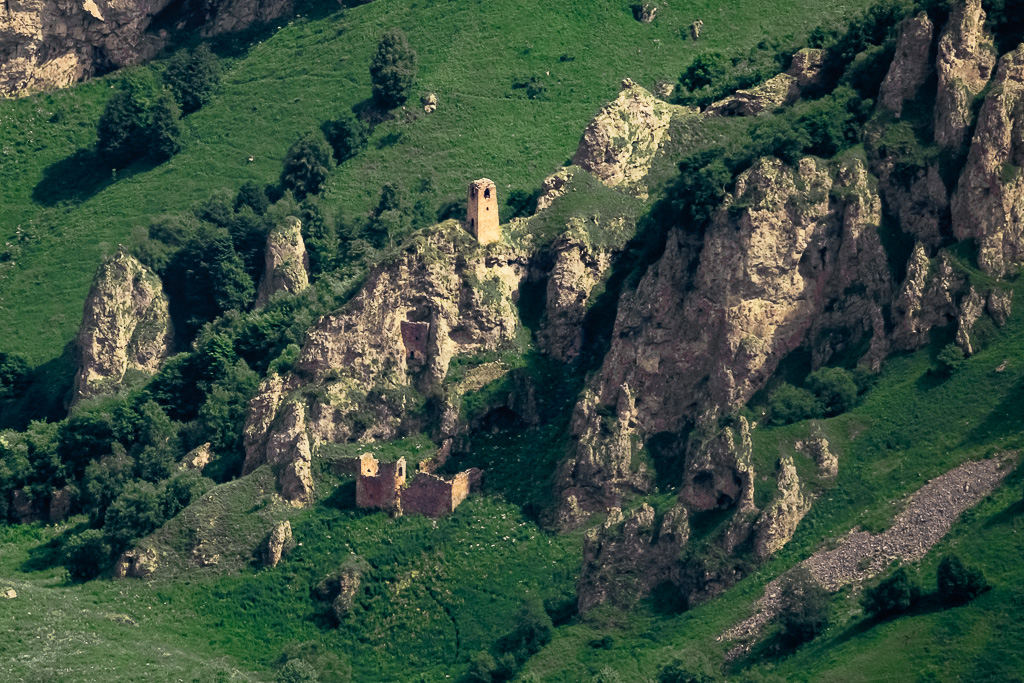
Tower settlement Khay

=== Location and siting ===
The locations of settlements with towers was based on a number of factors. Areas subject to natural disasters such as avalanches, earthquakes, floods, and landslides were avoided. Sites that controlled transport routes such roads, river crossings, and gorge entrances, were favored.

Local conditions and soil quality was also important. Fresh water sources were necessary, in the form of small rivers and springs, and many villages were located near the major rivers Assa and Armkhi. Settlement on the scarce and valuable arable land in mountainous areas was avoided, so tower settlements were usually built on barren areas with rocky soil, or on bare rocks.

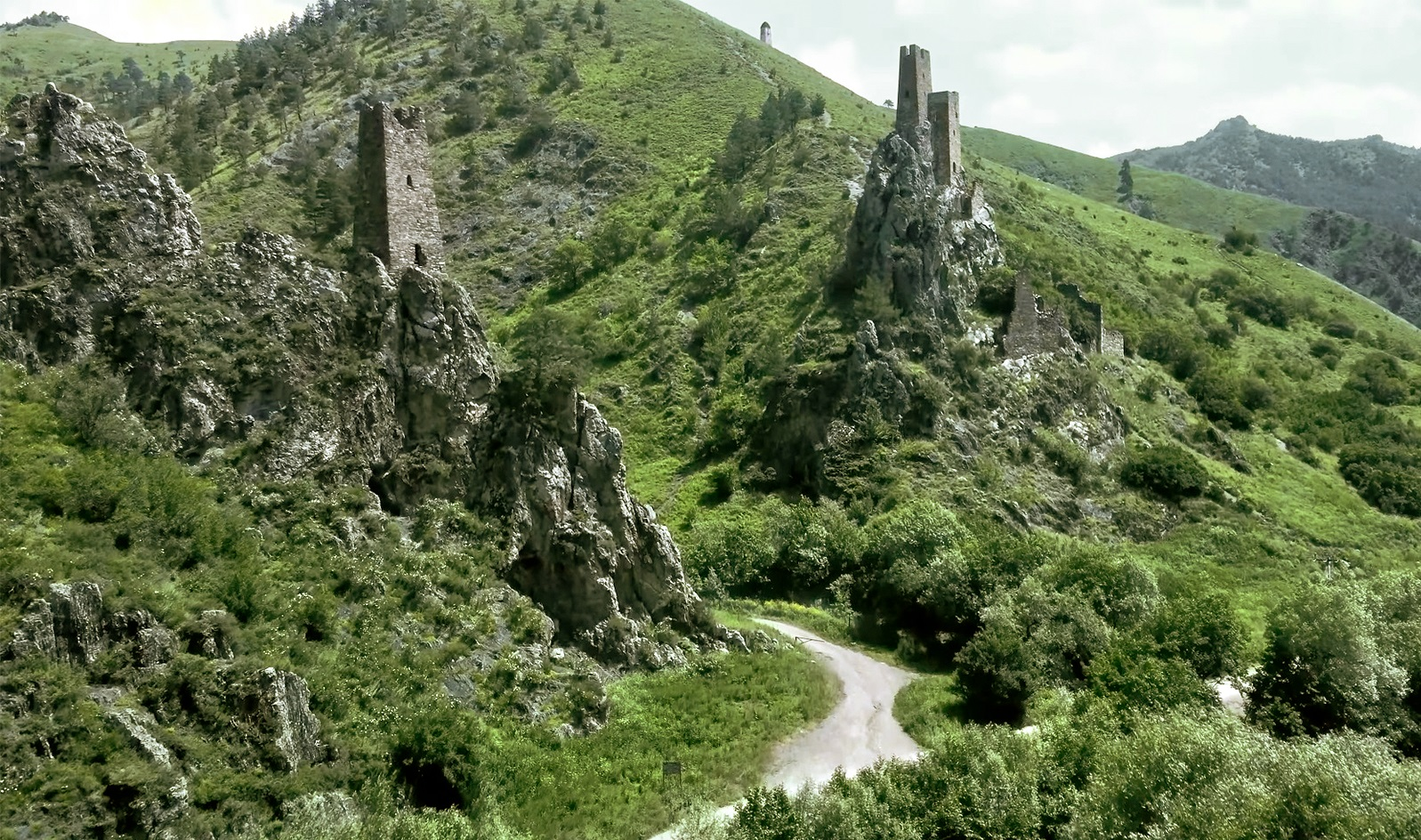
Vovnushki

In the mountains of Ingushetia, several signal and defensive towers built on rocky ledges can be observed. The most famous is the tower complex of Vovnushki, which in 2008 became a finalist in the Seven Wonders of Russia competition.

Similar constructions are found in Khay and in the Assa valley of Ingushetia. Two rocky shelter towers, erected in caves on the steep mountain slope of the rocky range above the villages Metskhal and Garq. The second shelter tower is located above the first, and covered a large cave in the past. Now most of the wall has collapsed. The stone steps leading into the cave have been preserved.

=== Aesthetics, cultural and building practices ===
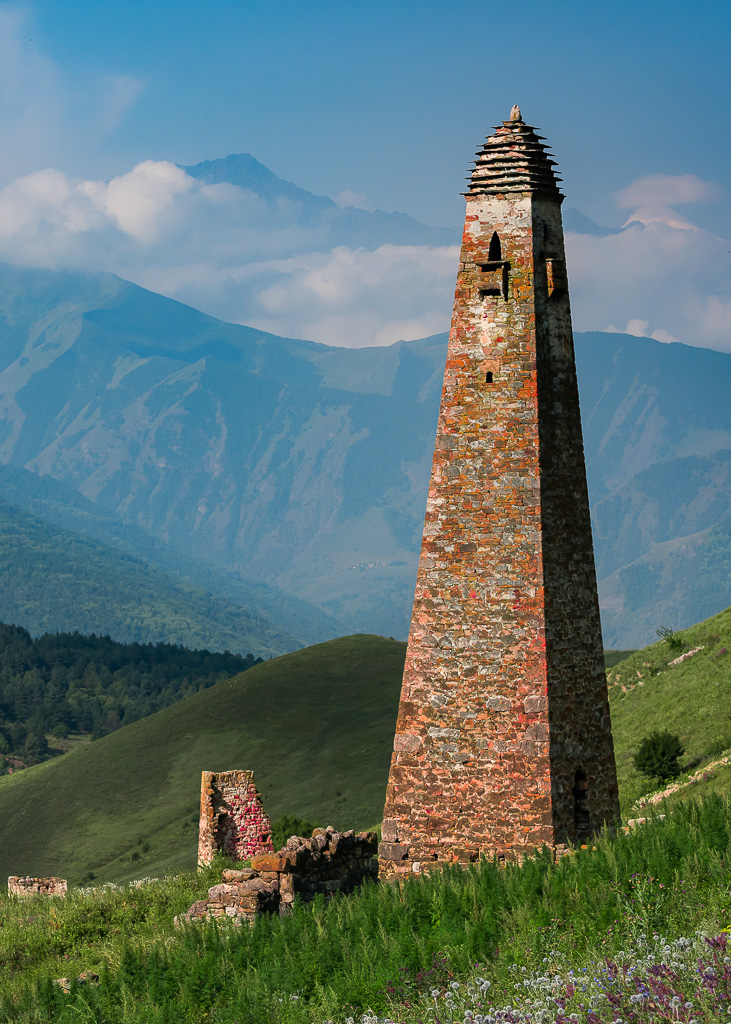
Combat tower (vhov) at Niy

The aesthetics and functionality of the tower structures were strictly observed. Constructing an Ingush tower was solemn and accompanied by various rituals. The first rows of stones were stained with the blood of a sacrificial animal. The master builder's employer was responsible for ensuring the master builder was fed.

External scaffolding was not used. Work was from the inside using temporary flooring resting on wall protrusions intended for permanent floors and corner slabs. The pyramidal roof of combat towers was assembled from the outside by rope-suspended craftsmen. When the masonry was finished, the master builder demanded a "descent" fee and made a hand print — chiseled or in wet mortar — at the tower entrance.

There are Ingush folk songs called illi about the construction of towers, which glorify their beauty, skill and talent of the craftsmen. One of them is called "Illi about how the tower was built".

Ingush clan prestige was affected by towers. A construction time of more than a year was perceived as weakness. Tower collapse also affected the reputation of the owning family, the reasoning being that the family had been too weak and poor to make full payment to the builders. Familial wealth was the important measure as class differences were unknown in Ingushetia. Tower building was an honorable occupation. Architects were known by name, as were the reputations of builders. Craftsmen were well rewarded for completing combat towers.

=== Ingush master builders ===
Construction was a well developed business in medieval Ingushetia. The scientific literature mentions specialized roles including stone miners, stone cutters and hired carriers. Master stonecutters were skilled tradesmen; they required training, experience, and specialized tools to shape the stones with "jeweler's precision". Builders required even more complex professional training. The skills and experience of professional craftsman were required to build combat towers; that less complex residential and commercial buildings did not.

Builders, or "artists of stone" (Ingush: тӏоговзанча, romanized: thogovzancha), were specialists in the construction of high-quality multi-story residential buildings, various types of crypts, temples and sanctuaries. A subset of Ingush masters were responsible for religious buildings associated with concepts sacred to the mountaineers. These masters were honored and recognized for their professional skills, and moral and ethical conduct. Recognized and famous master builders of the Middle Ages were:

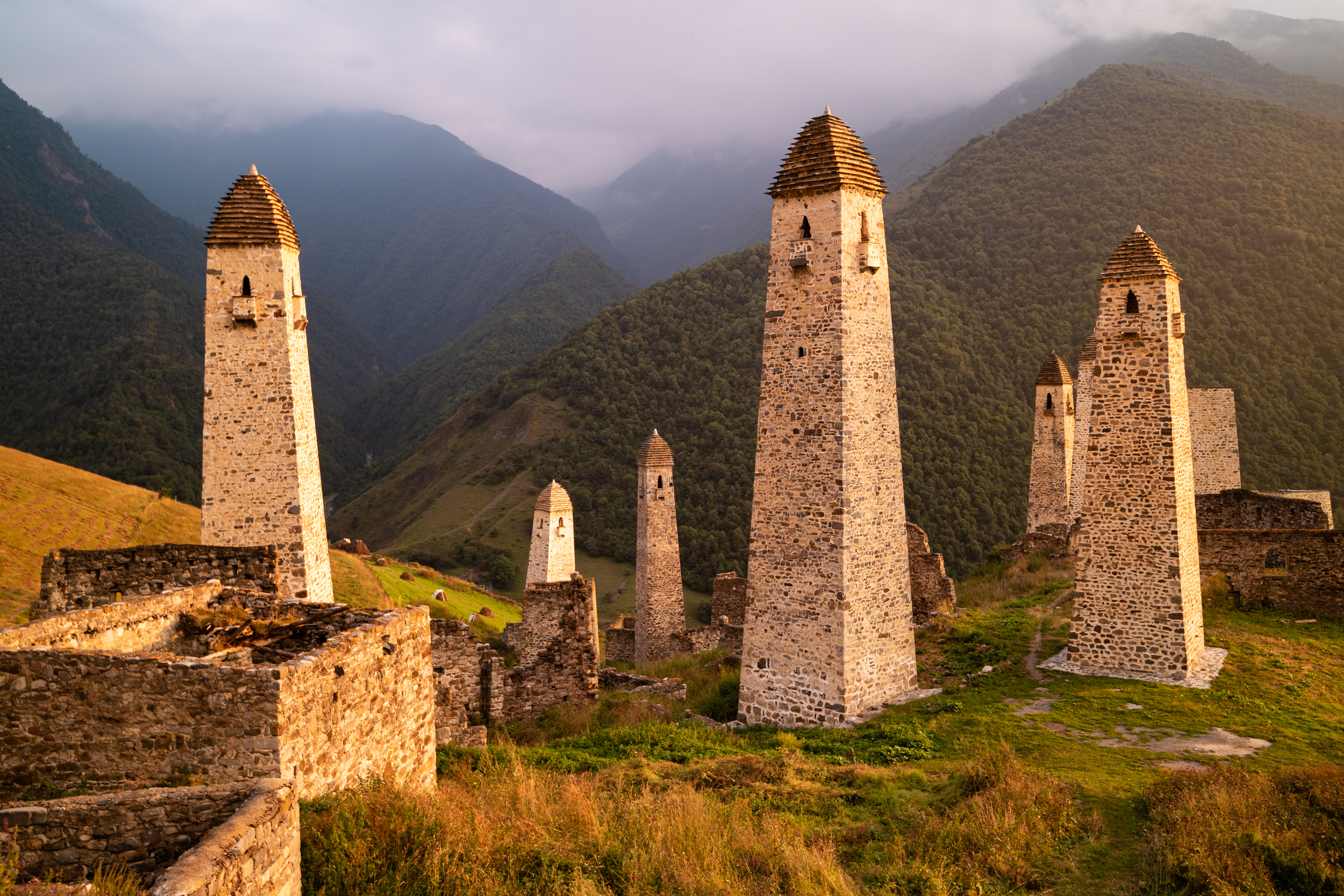
Erzi

- Yand from the village Erzi;
- Dugo Akhriev from the village Furtoug;
- Dyatsi Lyanov from the village Furtoug;
- Khazbi Tsurov from the village Furtoug;
- Baki Barkhanoev from the village Barkhanē;
- Erda Dudarov from the village Upper Guli;
- Arsamak Evloev from the village Yovli;
- Khing Khaniev from the village Khyani;
- Tet-Batyk Eldiev from the village Targim; and many others.

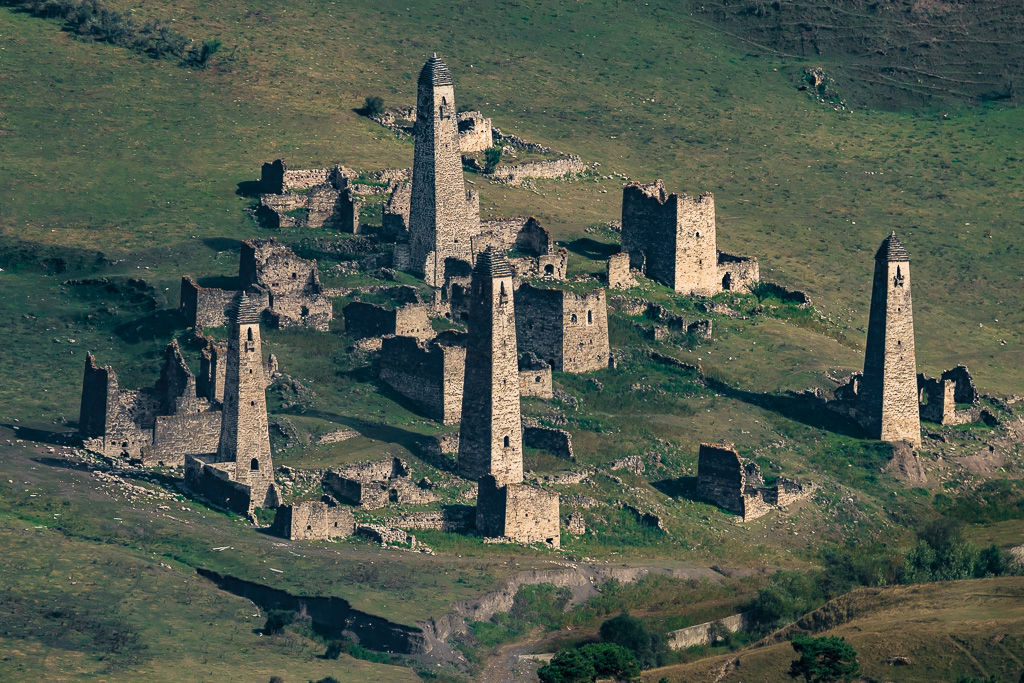
Targim

The construction craft was sometimes the work of almost entire family brotherhoods, a kind of "professional clan". Such recognized artisans, especially in the construction of military towers (vhov), included, e.g., the Barkinkhoev family from the villages of Upper, Middle and Lower Ozig (Ozdik). Ingush masters were also known outside Ingushetia—in Chechnya, Ossetia and Georgia.

Scholars have noted the leading role of the Ingush school of architecture in the 14th–18th centuries in the area covering the territories of present-day Chechnya, Ingushetia, North Ossetia and the northern regions of Georgia.

After exploring Ingush architecture, ethnographers Vladimir Basilov and Veniamin Kobychev concluded that the layering of various technical methods in Ingush buildings, from primitive to more advanced, and also genetically interconnected, convinces us that local architecture developed primarily on the basis of the accumulation of its own experience, and not affected by any external influences. The obvious continuity with the monuments of the Bronze Age makes us look for the origins of stone architecture among the Ingush in ancient times. This was asserted by Soviet researcher Arkady Goldshtein, who proclaimed the existing evidence of the work of Ingush master builders in Ossetia, Northern Georgia and Chechnya, whilst there being no evidence that foreign masters were ever invited to build in Ingushetia.

=== Towers with pyramidal roofs ===
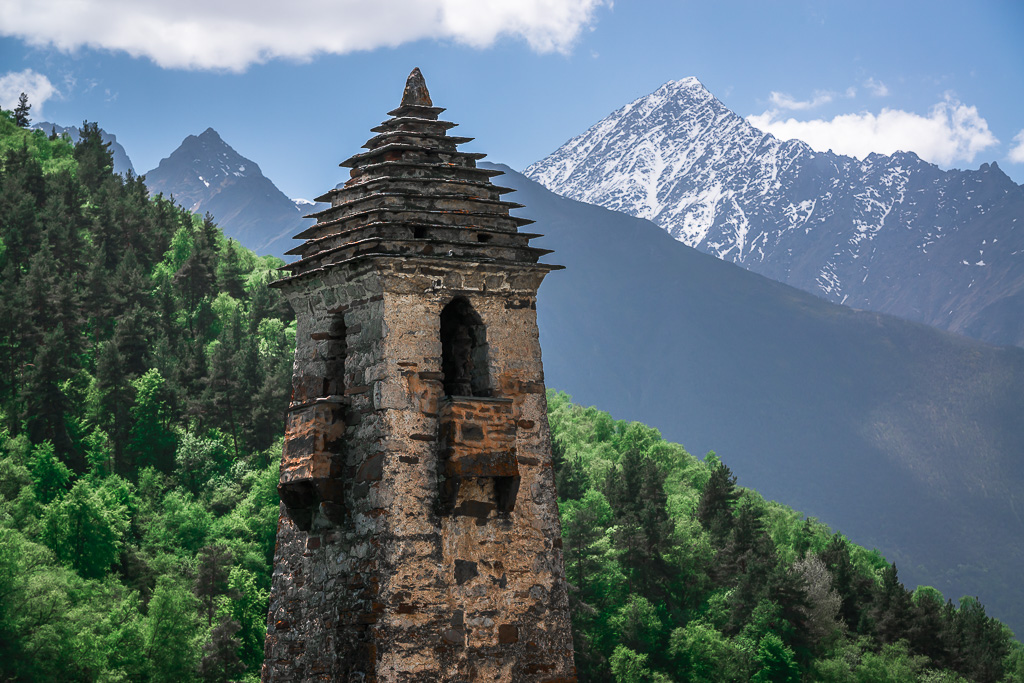
Battle tower in Khyani

Most of the stepped-pyramid towers were built with five floors and reached a height of 20 to 25 meters, as well as six-story towers whose height ranged from 26 to 30 meters. They are the most perfect in architectural terms and, as a rule, are part of castle complexes. There were similar towers in such villages as Upper and Lower Ezmi, Pkhamat, Lower Dzheyrakh, Lyazhgi, Morchi, Erzi (village), Upper Khuli, Khyani, Doshkhakle, Upper and Lower Kart, Upper, Middle and Lower Ozig, Kiÿ, Egikal, Pŭy, Pyaling, Niÿ and others.

The pyramidal-stepped roof of the tower, usually, consisted of thirteen slate slabs and was crowned with a large cone-shaped stone. Professor Evgeny Krupnov considered towers with pyramidal roofs as "an expression of the purely individual characteristics of Ingush culture." Based on ethnographic and archaeological data, specialist in the field of Caucasian stone architecture Arkady Goldshtein believed that the formation of the Caucasian combat tower with the pyramidal-stepped roof originated in Ingushetia.

=== Towers with flat roofs ===
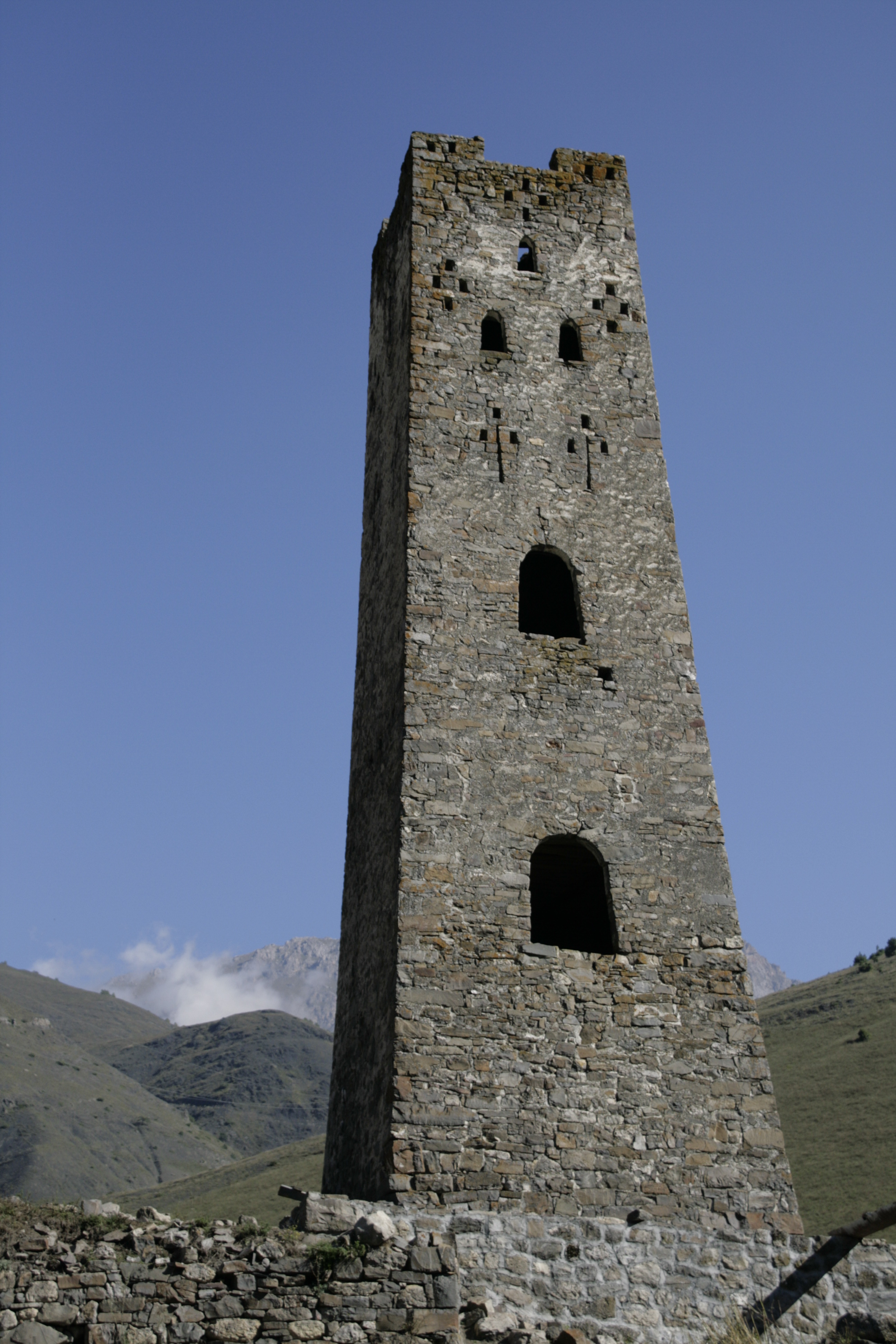
Battle tower in Byalgan (13th century)

Flat roof towers were usually built with 4–5 floors. Their roofs were reinforced for defense with a parapet or crenellated crown. Their height varied on average from 16 (e.g. Metskhal village) to 25 m (e.g. Barkinkhoy village). Combat towers with a flat covering, ending with a high parapet (barrier), were present in the villages Furtoug, Kharpe, Lyazhgi, Falkhan, Shoani, Gadaborsh, Qost, etc. Castle complexes in the village are equipped with towers with battlements at the corners of the roof. Govzt, Metskhal, Garq, Bìsht, Nyaqaste, Biysar, Tsori and others.

An example of a tower of this type is also the Byalgan combat tower. It is located on the slope of Mount Myat-Loam in the village of Byalgan. It is a 16-meter battle tower with a flat roof and a crenellated top. There are four more residential towers nearby. These are architectural monuments of the 9th–10th centuries, but this particular tower dates back to the 13th century.

== Purpose ==
Based on the principle of the functional purpose of Ingush monuments, archaeologist and art historian Leonid Semyonov divided them into three main groups, whose purpose was either defensive, religious or funerary.

Professor of archaeology, Evgeny Krupnov, proposed a similar typology. His first group included monumental residential and defensive structures, residential towers (ghalash), combat towers (vhovnash), fortified castles, fortifications and defensive walls.

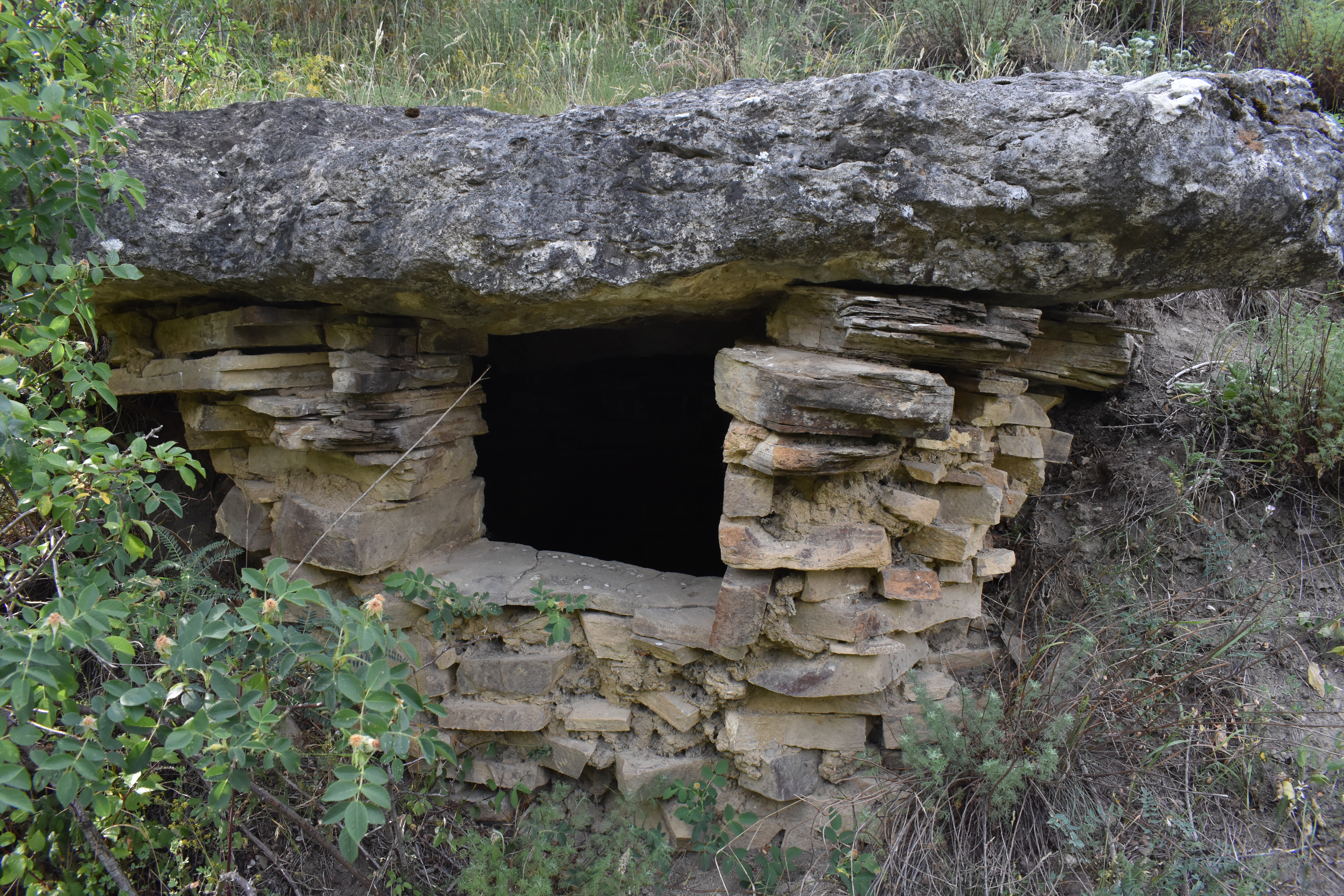
A semi-underground crypt of the Kuro-Araxes period at Egikal

The second group included burial structures including underground, semi-underground and above-ground stone crypts (kashamash), cave and ground burials, cists and mounds.

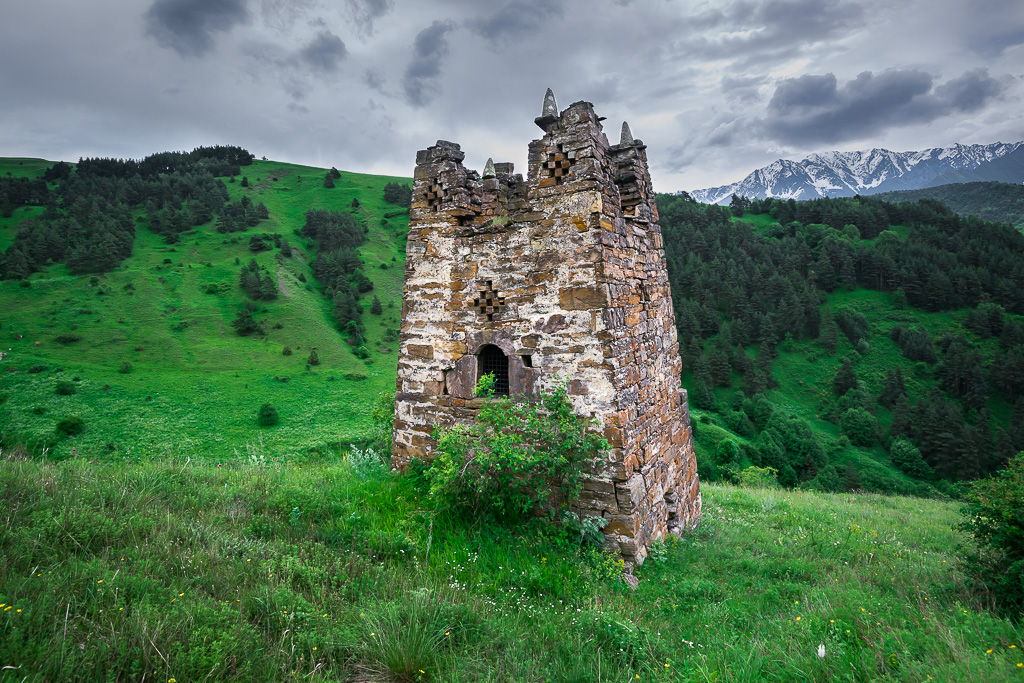
Crypt in Tsyzdy

The third group included ancient temples (e.g. Alby-Yerdy, Tkhaba-Yerdy), various kinds of pagan sanctuaries (e.g. Dyalite, Myat-Seli, Mago-Erda, Tumgoy-Erda, Kog-Erda, etc.) and roadside steles (churtash).

=== Residential towers ===
The residential or family tower (Ingush: гӀала, romanized: ghāla) was a square or rectangular stone building, usually built in two or three floors, with a flat earthen roof well coated with clay. The height of the three-story tower reached an average of 10–12 meters, and the dimensions of the base varied from 5×6 to 10×12 m. The walls of the tower are narrowed towards the top, which is a distinctive detail of the Ingush architecture of the Middle Ages. For example, combat or battle towers had a significant narrowing angle of the walls, reaching an average of 10–11 degrees. In the battle tower of the village of Upper Leymi, the narrowing angle of the walls reaches a record 14 degrees, which gives a special harmony to its appearance.

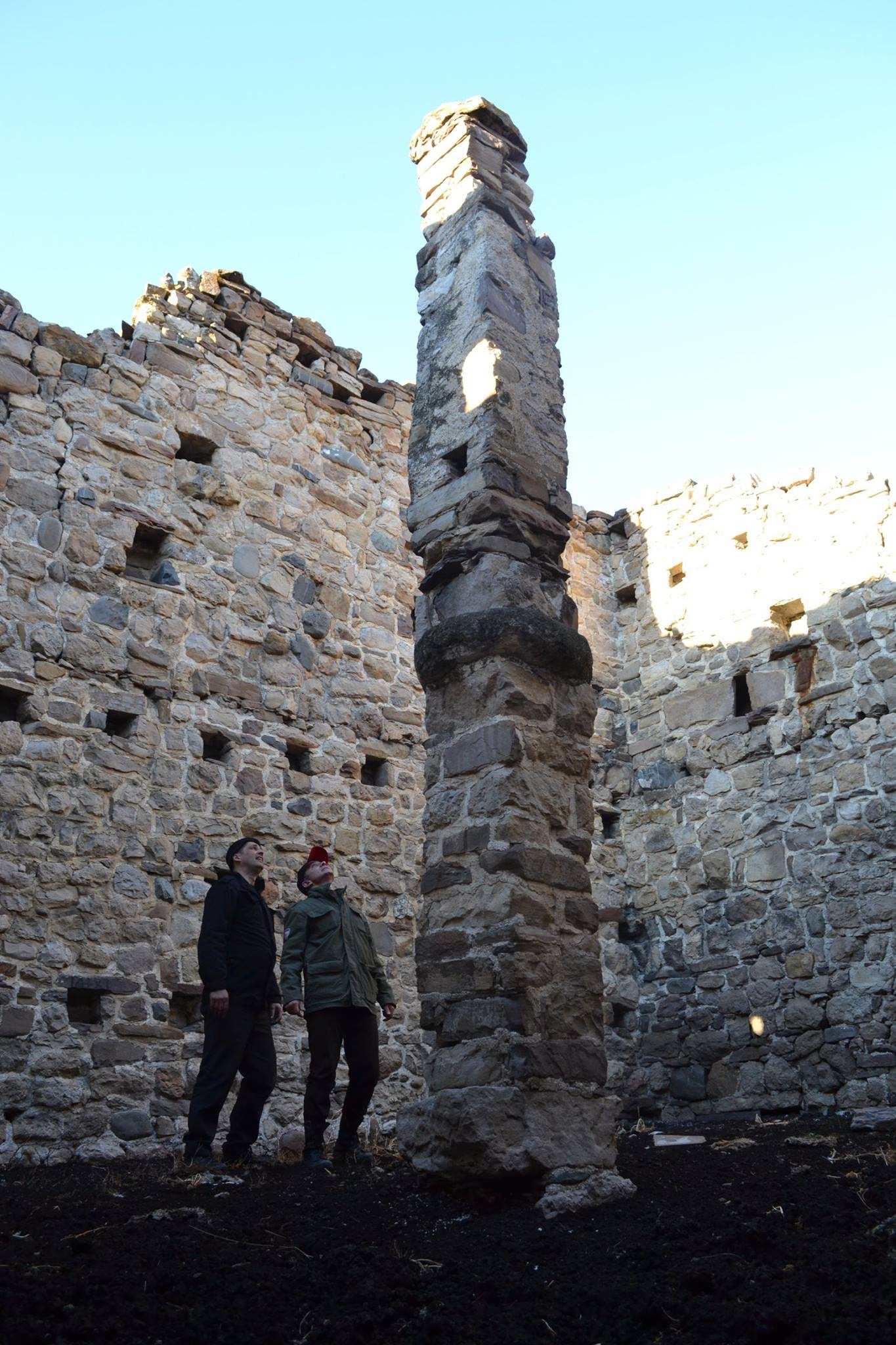
Central support pillar (erdabhoagha) of an Ingush residential tower

The masonry of the walls in the residential towers, which consisted of roughly processed stone blocks, was more primitive compared to the masonry of the military towers. The task of constructing a residential building differed from a combat one, since it required the speedy completion of construction to settle a family, so such close attention was not paid to the appearance. Towers were erected everywhere in mountainous Ingushetia using lime mortar, and the top was covered with a thick layer of yellow or yellowish-white plaster, and the masonry seams were covered with mortar from the inside. This was a characteristic detail of all architectural monuments of mountainous Ingushetia; military and residential towers, crypts and sanctuaries. According to legend, milk or whey and chicken eggs were added to the lime mortar.

The first floor of the residential tower was dedicated to a stable, in which the cattle were tied to the manger in a certain sequence. A special corner was arranged for the horse. Part of this room was fenced off; grain was stored in this corner. In some cases, the entire second floor was cleared for small livestock, where the cattle were driven along a wooden flooring arranged for this purpose. In the middle of the tower, from the very base, stood a quadrangular stone pillar (Ingush: ердабӏоагӏа, romanized: erdabhoagha), which served as a support for the main thick beams of the interfloor floors. Thinner beams ran across them, resting at one end on the stones of the opposite side protruding parallel to them. Brushwood was laid on top of the beams, onto which clay was poured and compacted.

In most towers, the second floor was the main living space (Ingush: лакхера цӏа, romanized: laqera ts'a). On average, it was 40–45 m² in area, in some towers the area was quite significant: 60–70 m². The height of this floor exceeded 3–4 m. It was a spacious room containing basic household items: bedding, dishes, and utensils. A central hearth (Ingush: кхуврч, romanized: quvrch) was also built here, above which a supra-focal chain (Ingush: зӏы, romanized: z'y) descended. The family spent most of their time in this room., free from work and other worries. The last floor was intended for storing food and agricultural equipment. It was also a room for resting guests, who, upon receiving them in the living quarters, were accommodated for the night in a separate upper room, where a special sleeping place was equipped for this purpose. Sometimes a balcony was added to the third floor, which had an economic purpose. Initially, a ghala also had a defensive significance, which is confirmed by the structural details of the architecture: protective parapets on the roof of the towers, the construction of many viewing slots and loopholes, compartments for keeping servants (prisoners of war) etc.

=== Semi-combat towers ===
Researchers consider the so-called semi-combat towers to be a transitional form from residential to combat towers. They differ from residential and combat towers in that they contain elements of both. They were built on 3–4 floors. At the base, semi-combat towers are almost square and have a smaller area compared to residential ones. Their sizes range from 4.5–5 m in width to 5–5.5 m in length. Height is 12–16 m. These towers do not have central support pillars, but have hanging machicolated balconies, like battle towers. The ceiling of the walls, like those of residential towers, is flat and made of logs. The entrance is located in the same way as for residential towers, on the ground floor. It is very rare to find semi-combat towers in which the entrance, like combat towers, is located on the second floor.

=== Combat towers ===
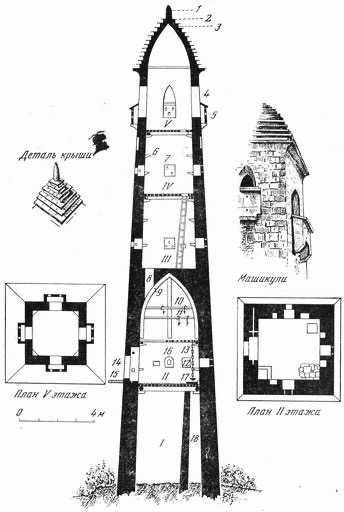
Sections of an Ingush battle tower, drawn by Ivan Shcheblykin in 1928

The highest achievement of Ingush tower architecture is associated with the construction of the military (combat) towers (Ingush: вӀов, romanized: vhóv). The Ingush combat towers were of several types, which, as experts explain, trace the evolution of the technology for constructing defensive structures in the mountains of the North Caucasus. It is believed that combat towers appeared during the improvement of construction techniques, through the evolution of residential towers, first into semi-combat ones, then into combat towers with a flat crown and, finally, into towers with a stepped pyramidal roof. At the same time, the appearance of more advanced towers did not mean the cessation of the construction of previous types; they all equally continued to be erected until the late Middle Ages.

Each floor of the battle towers had its own specific functions. One of the first to try to characterize these functions was the architect Ivan Shcheblykin, who wrote: "the first floor was intended for prisoners, the second for guards and defenders, the third and fourth for defenders and family, and the fifth for observers and family." The first floor served as a prison for prisoners and storage of agricultural supplies; for this purpose they were equipped with special cone-shaped stone "bags", i.e. compartments at the corners of the tower. It could only be entered through a square hole from the second floor. The entrance to the tower was usually located at the level of the second floor, which also deprived potential enemies of the opportunity to use a ram. It was a vaulted doorway, closed from the inside with strong wooden shutters and locked with a wooden beam that slid into the thickness of the walls. And only some towers, located in hard-to-reach places, had an entrance on the ground floor.

The second floor served as housing in case of a siege. Above it, as well as above the upper floor, stone ceilings were built in the form of a closed (four-sided) false vault with a lancet outline. Such a ceiling, unlike a wooden one, could not be set on fire if the besiegers burst inside, and the besieged locked themselves upstairs. They were also intended to enhance the seismic resistance of the tower, so, being completed with a strong stone vault that strengthened all four walls, the second floor became additional support for subsequent floors. Some battle towers (in particular, the Lyazhgi complex, built by master builder Khanoy Khing) were reinforced with an additional stone vault between the fourth and fifth floors to give them special strength. And in most cases, other vertical floors were divided by wooden floors supported by ledges and special stone cornices. Communication between floors was carried out through square confined spaces, hatches equipped in the corners of the towers, along ladders in the form of jagged logs. These passages between floors were arranged in a zigzag pattern. Starting from the second, each floor had skylights, combat niches (loopholes) and viewing slits (eyeholes). The construction of the loopholes was carried out in such a way as to cover, if possible, all approaches to the tower.

At the level of the last (fifth or sixth) floor, which was the main observation point and at the same time the main combat platform, weapons were stored here: stones, bows, arrows, guns. In the middle part of each of the walls of the floor there were through door niches (embrasures). They were covered with special stone hanging balconies, i.e. machicolations (Ingush: чӏерх, romanized: ch'erkh). The upper part of the embrasure remained free for observation. Archaeologist Maksharip Muzhukhoev suggested that the choice of building one or another type of defensive tower depended on the terrain. Based on the architecture of towers with a pyramidal stepped roof, which are distinguished by the greatest defensive capability, Muzhukhoev believed that this type of tower was erected in easily accessible places, the approach to which was not naturally fortified. Such towers were built taking into account that the enemy would be able to get close to the walls of the tower. In places difficult to access, from the point of view of a possible assault, less fortified flat-roofed towers were erected.

=== Watch towers ===
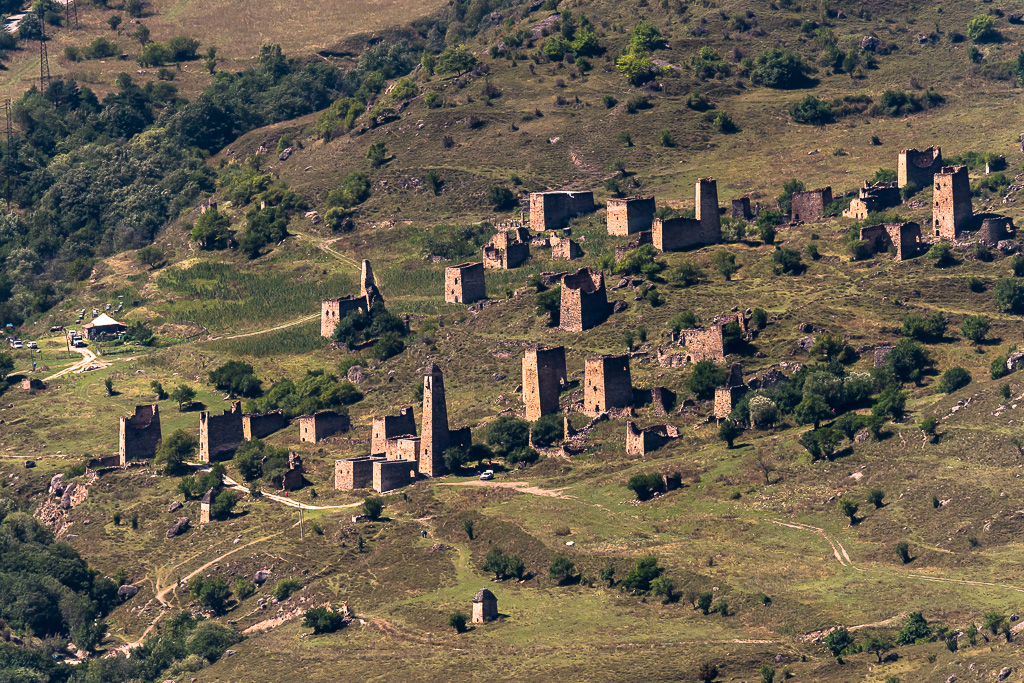
Egikal

Although combat towers were simultaneously built for both signal and military purposes, several towers (outposts) were built solely for the purpose of alerting nearby villages of approaching danger (e.g. Ghalghai Koashke, Zem-Ghala, Kur-Ghala, Maiden tower, Pẋagalbäri, Gir-chozh castle, etc.) The majority of these watchtowers were built on cliffs in mountain gorges, yet several were located at strategically important places on the plain or piedmont, like the medieval tower settlement of Zaur, from which the surrounding area was visible from a distance.

Since ancient times, in the mountains of the Galgai, the people had fortified settlements spreading to present-day Khevsureti and Tusheti. Along the gorges of the rivers Terek and Assa existed stone walls called "Galgai Koashke" with watchtowers that secured the passages, the remains of which are still visible today.

— F. I. Gorepekin

==== Ingush signaling system ====
Ingush villages were built close to each other, with intervals of 500 meters to a kilometer. From one village it was always possible to see the battle towers of its neighbors: the towers were also used as signal towers; in a matter of seconds, an alarm signal was transmitted over many kilometers. Almost all villages are "stuck" to the tops of hills, the slopes of gorges or the ridges of ridges. If one looks at a map of mountainous Ingushetia, one will notice that tower villages stretch in a continuous chain along the valleys of Assa, Armkhi and their tributaries.

== Cultural Legacy ==
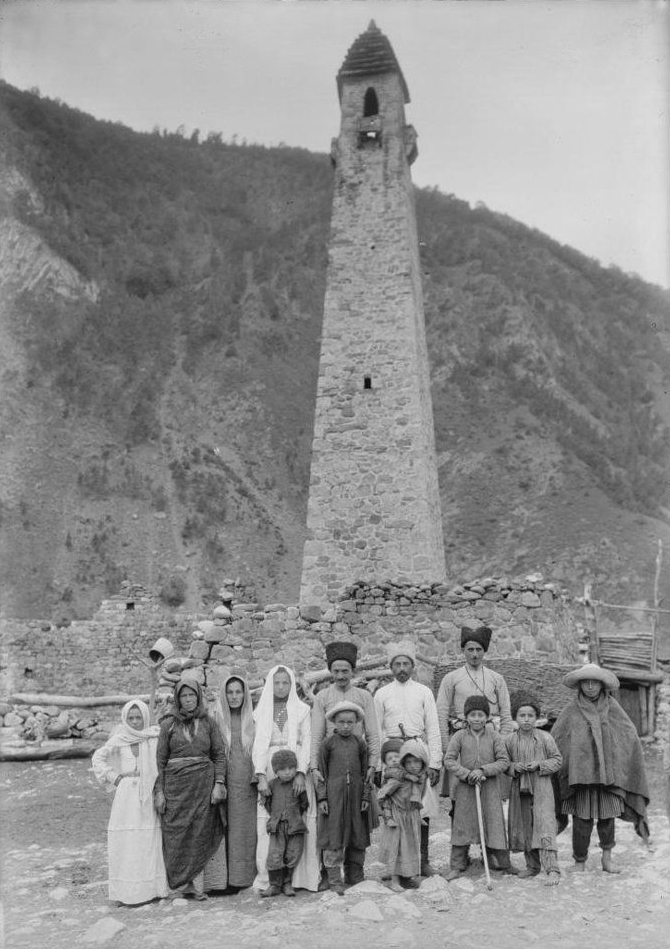
Puy (late 19th century)

Usually at the entrance to the tower there is a handprint of the hand of the craftsman who erected the building. It was a kind of guarantee of the strength of the architect's creation, which has been confirmed by time—the towers outlived their creators for many centuries.

Petroglyphs are carved on many towers. Among them are signs resembling letters, drawings in the form of crosses, spirals, swastikas, solar circles, images of household items and weapons. Family symbols were also depicted on the towers.

The tower culture of Ingushetia, a vibrant legacy of ancient material culture, is unique both in the Caucasus and throughout the world. The Ingush as an ethnic group are inextricably linked with their tower culture. It is believed that for many centuries the tower complexes developed among the Ingush mountaineers an aesthetic sense of beauty, a sense of caring for the house as a family sanctuary, which is one of the foundations of the Ingush code of honor—Ezdel.

== Access and Preservation ==
Access to many towers is limited due to remoteness or border zone restrictions.

Preservation is also an issue, as significant damage to towers was caused by invasions during the Tsardom of Russia, the Russian conquest of the Caucasus, the Russian Revolution, and the deportation of the Chechens and Ingush from 1944 to 1957, which destroyed half of the nation's historical monuments.

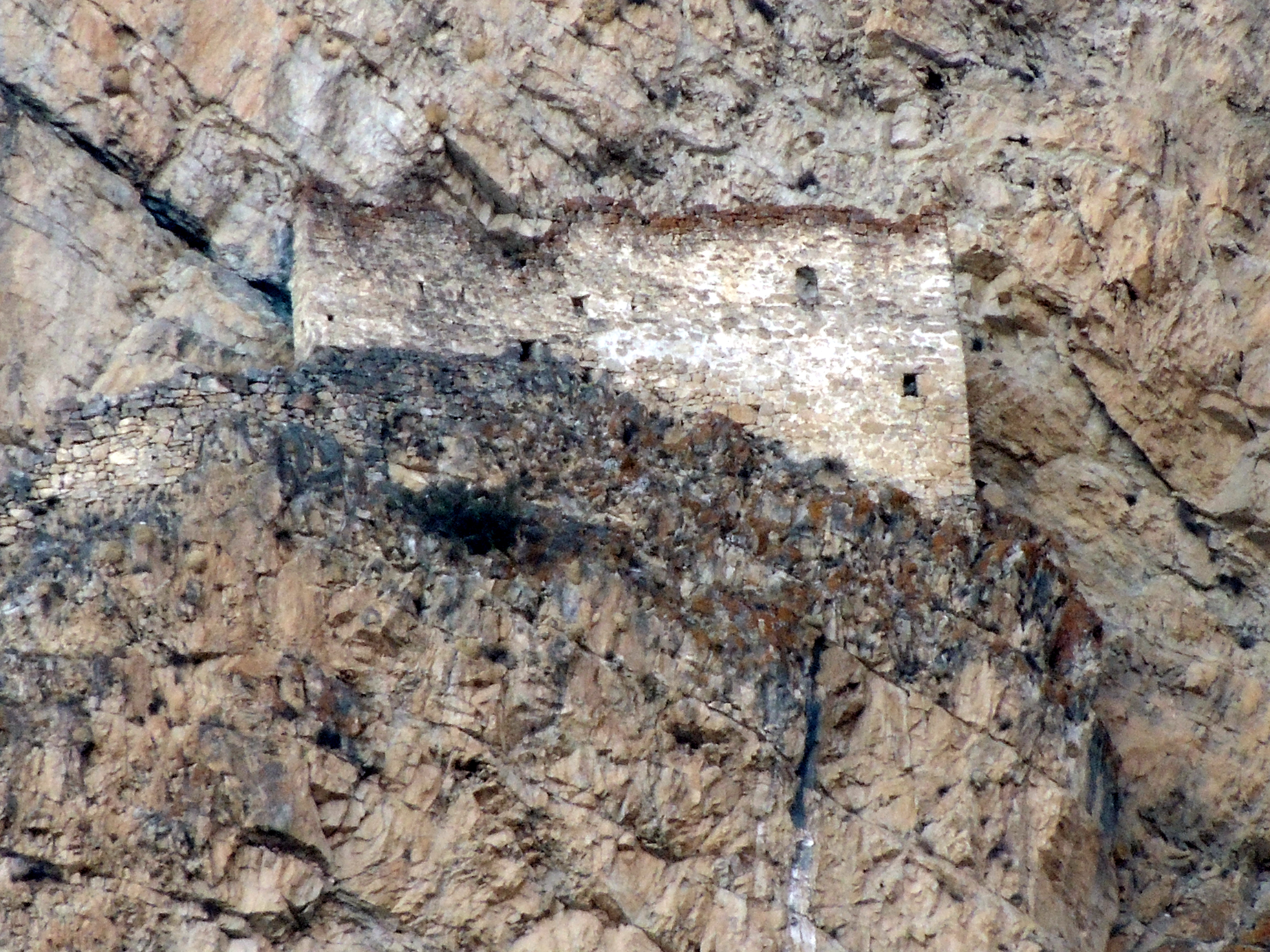
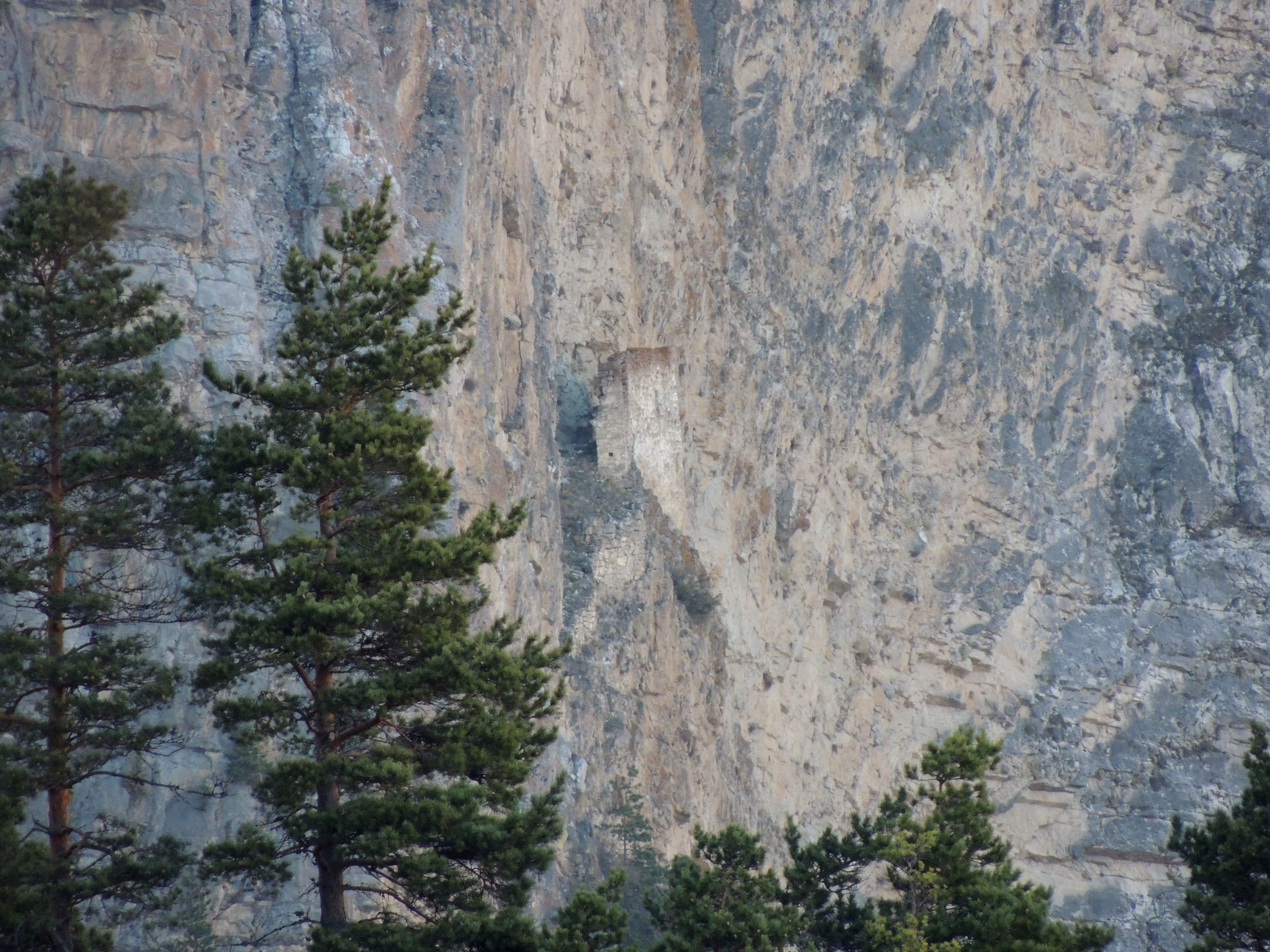
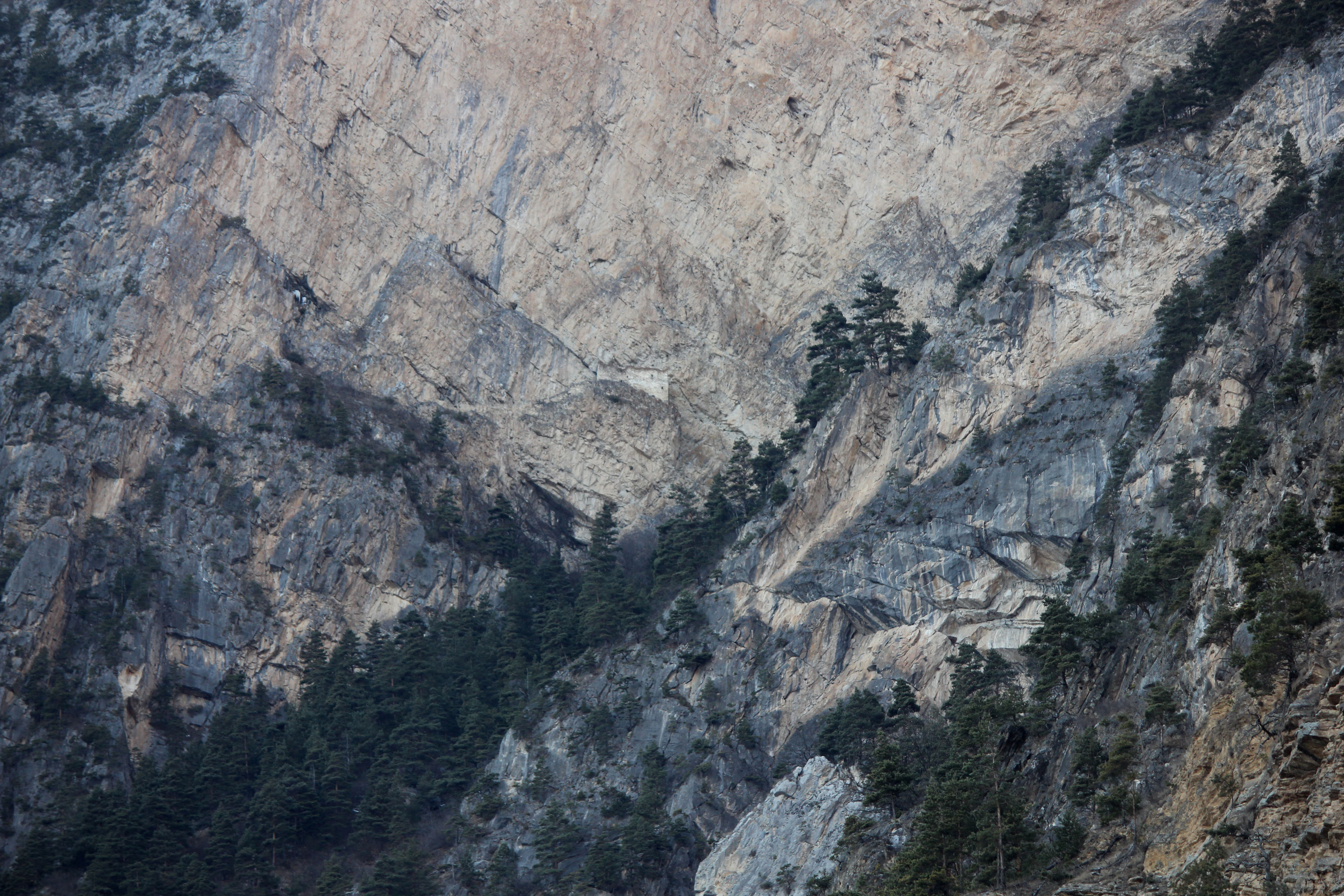
Ruins of a medieval cliff tower located on the inaccessible slope of Mount Tsey-Loam along the Assa valley, 1700 meters above sea level.

== Gallery ==
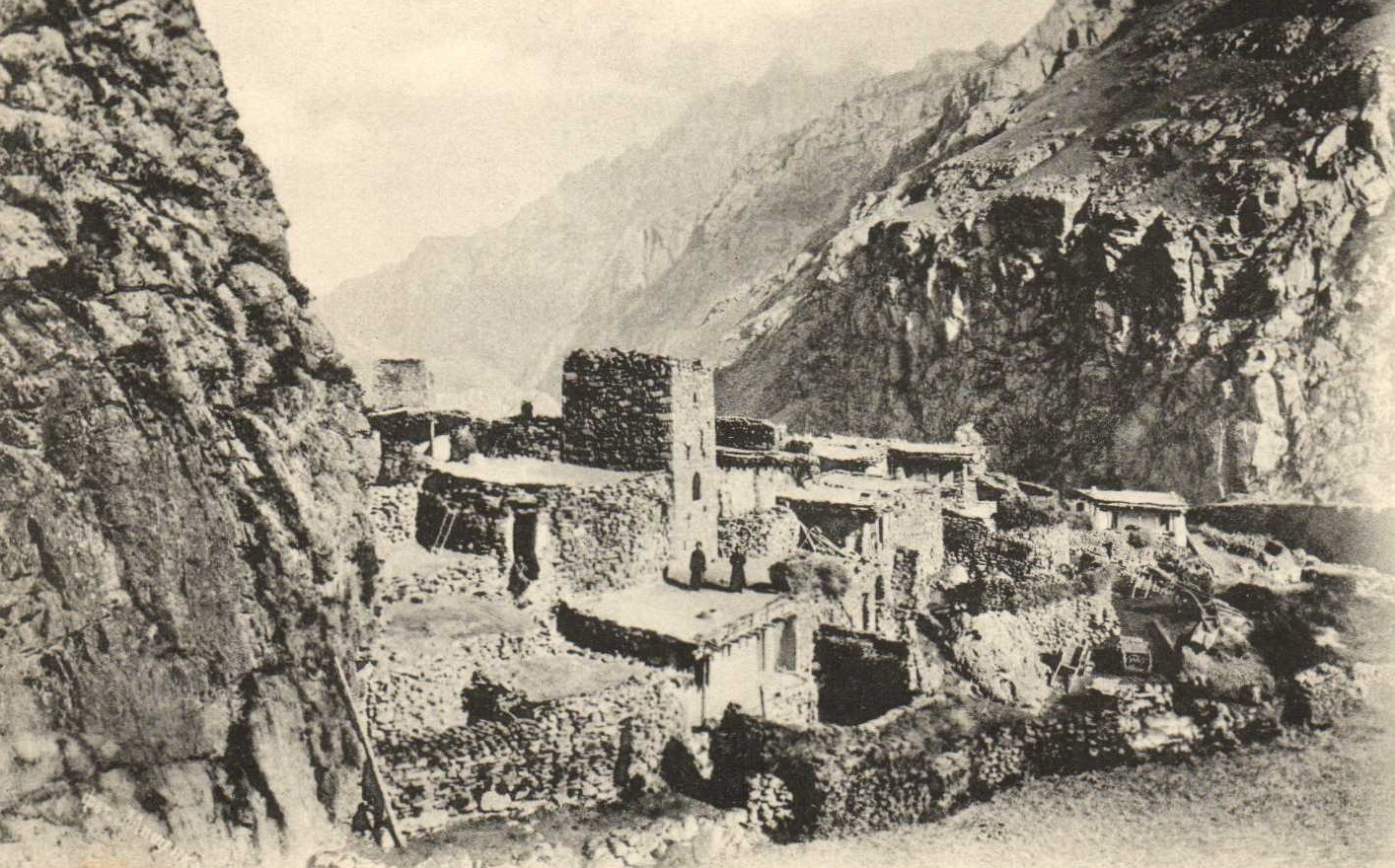
Gveleti (1902)

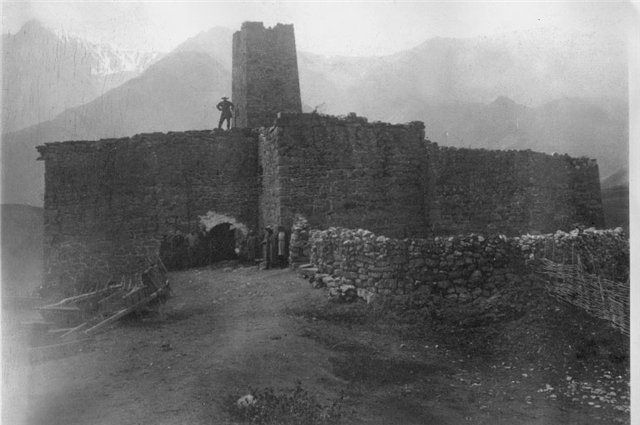
Metskhal (1903)

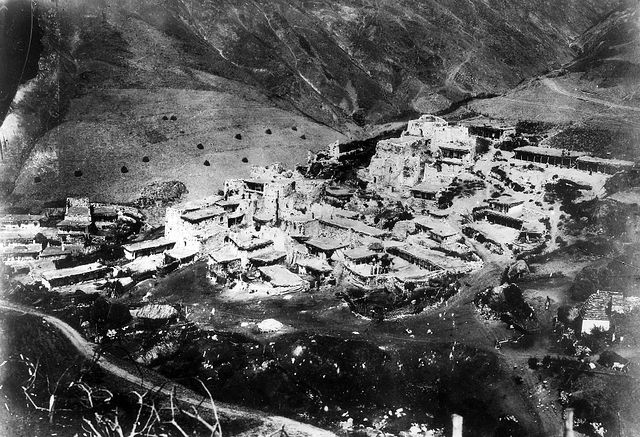
Guli (1910)

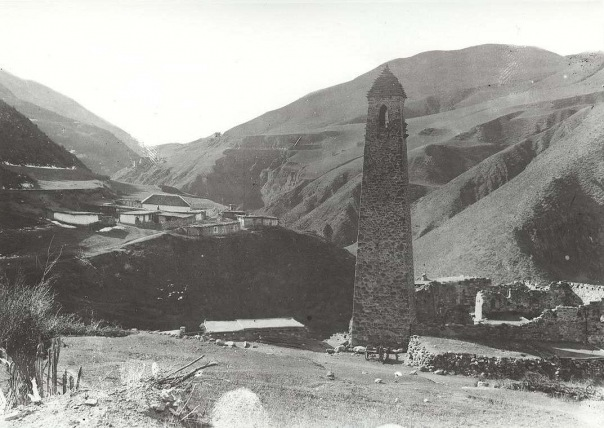
Dzheyrakh (1921)

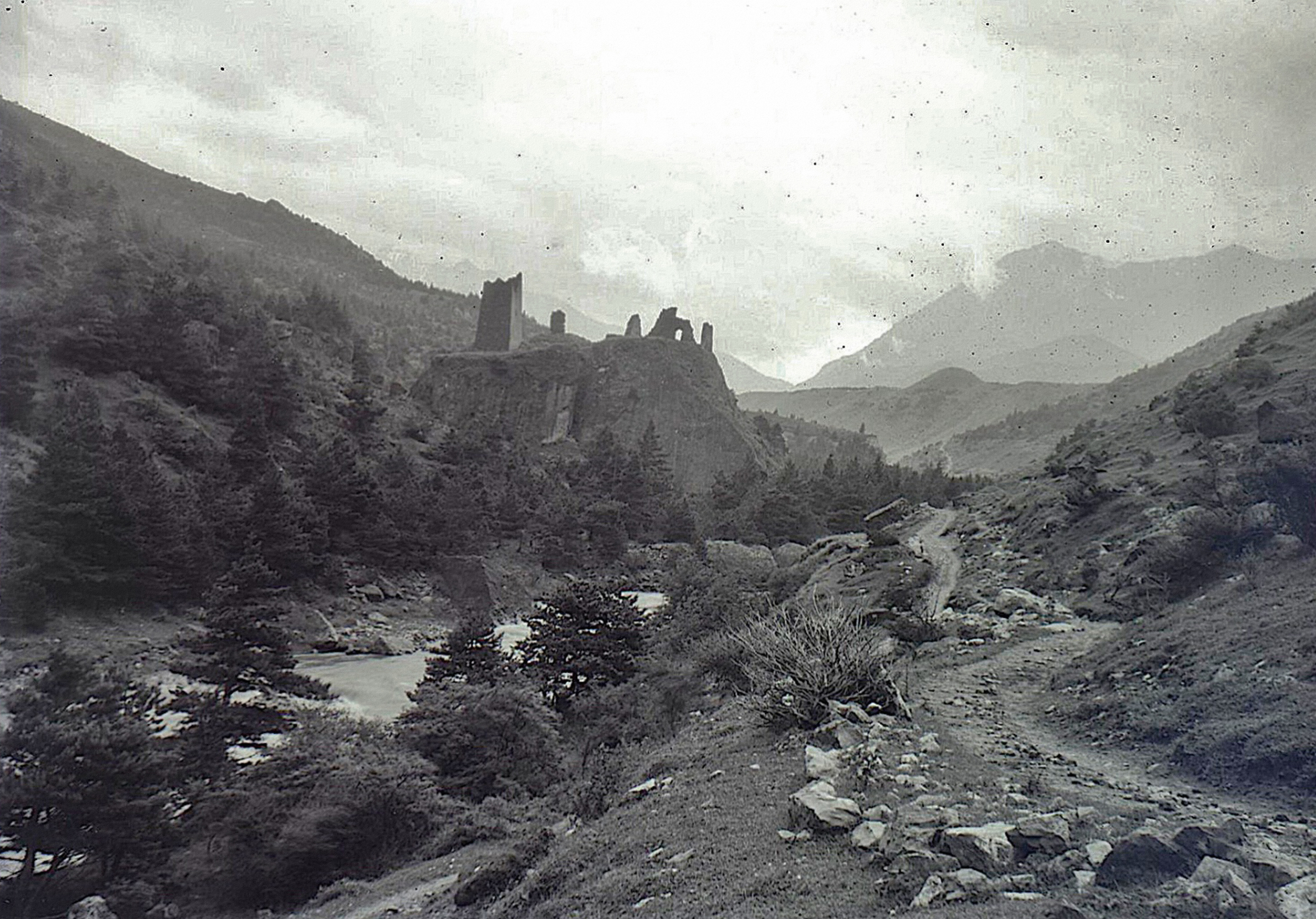
Ghalghai Koashke (early 20th century)

== See also ==
- Ghalghai
- Tower of Concord
- Nine Towers
- Vainakh tower architecture
- Svan towers

== Sources ==
- Chakhkiev, Djabrail (2003). Древности Горной Ингушетии [Antiquities of Mountainous Ingushetia] (in Russian). Vol. 1. Minvody: Kavkazskaya zdravnitsa.
- Dakhkilgov, Ibragim (2003). "Древняя ингушская архитектура" [Ancient Ingush architecture] (in Russian).
- Dolgieva, Maryam; Kartoev, Magomet; Kodzoev, Nurdin; Matiev, Timur (2013). Kodzoev, Nurdin; et al. (eds.). История Ингушетии [History of Ingushetia] (4th ed.). Rostov-Na-Donu: Yuzhnyy izdatelsky dom. pp. 1–600. ISBN 978-5-98864-056-1.
- Muzhukhoev, Maksharip (1995). Ингуши: Страницы истории, вопросы материальной духовной культуры [Ingush: Pages of history, issues of material spiritual culture] (in Russian). Saratov: Detskaya kniga. ISBN 5-8270-0158-9.
- Muzhukhoev, Maksharip (1977). Средневековая материальная культура горной Ингушетии (XIII—XVII вв.) [Medieval material culture of mountainous Ingushetia (XIII-XVII centuries)] (in Russian). Grozny: ChIKI.
- Basilov, Vladimir; Kobychev, Veniamin (1971). "Галгай — страна башен" [Galgai: country of towers] (PDF). Советская этнография (in Russian) (3). Moscow: Nauka: 120–135.
- Shcheblykin, Ivan (1928). Искусство ингушей в памятниках материальной культуры [Ingush art in monuments of material culture.] (in Russian). Vladikavkaz: INIIK.
- Shavkhelishvili, Аbram (1966). Архитектурные памятники средневековья и исторические места, связанные с гражданской войной в Чечено-Ингушетии [Architectural monuments of the Middle Ages and historical sites associated with the civil war in Checheno-Ingushetia] (in Russian). Grozny.
- Makalatiya, Sergei (1940). Хевсурети: историко-этнографический очерк дореволюционного быта хевсуров [Khevsureti: historical and ethnographic sketch of the pre-revolutionary life of Khevsurs] (in Russian). Tbilisi: Gruzinskoe Kraevedchskoe Obshch-vo.
- Krupnov, Evgeny (1971). Средневековая Ингушетия [Medieval Ingushetia] (in Russian). Moscow: Nauka. pp. 1–211.
- Robakidze, Aleksei (1968). Кавказский этнографический сборник. Очерки этнографии Горной Ингушетии [Caucasian ethnographic collection. Essays on the ethnography of Mountainous Ingushetia] (in Russian). Vol. 2. Tbilisi: Metsniereba.
- Kegeles, M. (1931). У горах i на полонинах Iнгушетii [In the mountains and steppes of Ingushetia] (PDF) (in Ukrainian). Vol. 2. Kharkov: Proletar.
- Markovin, Vladimir (1975). Некоторые особенности средневековой ингушской архитектуры [Certain features of medieval Ingush architecture] (in Russian). Vol. 23. Москва: Arkhitekturnoe nasledstvo.
- Markovin, Vladimir (1994). Каменная летопись страны вайнахов: Памятники архитектуры и искусства Чечни и Ингушетии [Stone chronicle of the Vainakh country: Monuments of architecture and art of Chechnya and Ingushetia] (in Russian). Moscow: Russkaya kniga.
- Akhmatova, Raisa; et al., eds. (1979). Илли: Героико-эпические песни чеченцев и ингушей [Illi: Heroic-epic songs of the Chechens and Ingush] (in Russian). Грозный: «ЧИКИ».
- Khasiev, Said-Magomed (1983). "Из истории развития кустарных промыслов чеченцев и ингушей в дореволюционном прошлом (обработка металла и камня)". Хозяйство и хозяйственный быт народов Чечено-Ингушетии (in Russian). Grozny.
- Mutaliev, Tamerlan (2004). "Славные сыновья и дочери Ингушетиии". Архивный вестник Республики Ингушетия (in Russian). pp. 37–48.
- Piotrovsky, Boris; et al., eds. (1988). История народов Северного Кавказа с древнейших времен до конца XVIII в. [History of the peoples of the North Caucasus from ancient times to the end of the 18th century] (in Russian). Moscow: Nauka. pp. 1–544.
- Goldshtein, Arkady (1975). Средневековое зодчество Чечено-Ингушетии и Северной Осетии [Medieval architecture of Checheno-Ingushetia and North Ossetia] (in Russian). Moscow: Nauka. pp. 1–158.
- Goldshtein, Arkady (1977). Башни в горах [Towers in the mountains] (in Russian). Moskva: Sovetsky khudozhnik. pp. 1–334.
- Targimov, Hussein (2023-01-05). "Комитет по туризму региона получил патент на использование слогана "Ингушетия — родина башен"" [The region's tourism committee received a patent for the use of the slogan "Ingushetia—the birthplace of towers"]. Ingushetia (in Russian).
- Gorepekin, Foma (2006). Краткие сведения о народе "Ингуши" [Brief information about the “Ingush”] (in Russian). Saint Petersburg – via Материалы ПФА РАН. ф.800, оп.6, д.159, л.л. 38–55.
- Sampiev, Israpil (2023-03-30). "К проблеме классификации боевых башен Ингушетии" [On the issue of classification of battle towers in Ingushetia]. История, археология и этнография Кавказа [History, Arсheology and Ethnography of the Caucasus] (in Russian). Vol. 1. pp. 221–240 – via Дагестанский федеральный исследовательский центр РАН.
- Sulimenko, Sergey (1997). Башни Северного Кавказа (символизация пространства в домостроительном творчестве горцев) [Towers of the North Caucasus (The Symbolization of Space in the House-Building Creativity of Mountain Peoples)] (in Russian). Vladikavkaz: Проект-Пресс. p. 150. ISBN 5-88734-010-X.
- Tarakanova, Marina (2023). Самые лучшие места России и мира 4D [The best places in Russia and the world 4D] (in Russian). Nalchik: Mezhizdat. pp. 1–160. ISBN 978-5-17-152205-6.
- Butkov, Pyotr (1837). "Мнѣніе о книгѣ: Славянскія древности" [Opinion about the book: Slavic antiquities]. Три древніе договора руссовъ съ норвежцами и шведами [Three ancient treaties of the Russians with the Norwegians and the Swedes] (in Russian). Saint Petersburg: Типографія Министерства внутреннихъ дѣлъ. pp. 1–66 (311–378 as PDF).
- Baddeley, John F. (1908). The Russian Conquest of the Caucasus (PDF). London: Longmans, Green & Co. pp. 1–599.
- Semjonov, Leonid (1928). Археологические и этнографические разыскания в Ингушетии в 1925–27 гг [Archaeological and ethnographic research in Ingushetia in 1925–27] (in Russian). Vol. 1. Vladikavkaz: Известия ИНИИК. pp. 1–34.
