= Chistov =

Chistov (Russian: Чистов) is a Russian masculine surname originating from the word chistyi, meaning clean; its feminine counterpart is Chistova. Notable people with the surname include:

- Kirill Chistov (1919–2007), Russian ethnographer
- Stanislav Chistov (born 1983), Russian ice hockey player
- Yuri Chistov, researcher
