= Tower of Concord =

Tower in Magas, Ingushetia

- Барта гӏала
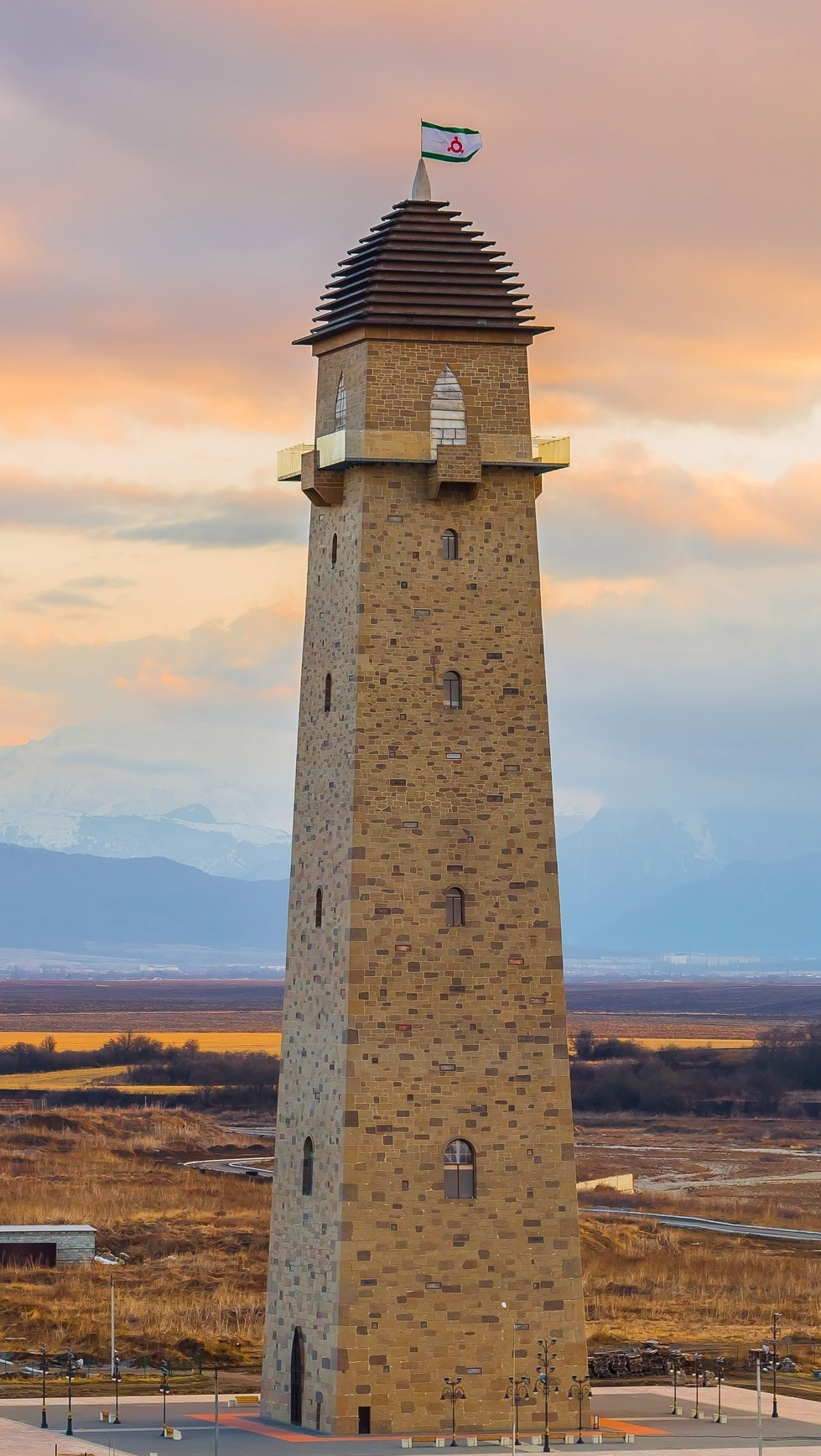
- Interactive map of Tower of Concord

General information
- Type: Monument
- Architectural style: Ingush
- Location: Magas, Ingushetia, Russia
- Coordinates: 43°10′0.6″N 44°48′6″E
- Year built: 2012-2013
- Height: 100 m (330 ft)

Design and construction
- Architect: Sergei Borisovich Tkachenko

The Tower of Concord (Russian: Башня Согласия, IPA: [ˈbaʂnʲə sɐˈɡɫasʲɪjə]; Ingush: Барта гӏала, romanized: Barta ġala, IPA: [ˈbəɾtə ˈɣɑːɫə]) a high-rise building erected in 2013 in the center of the capital of the Republic of Ingushetia — Magas, in the form of a classic medieval Ingush tower four times enlarged. The height of the tower reaches 100 m (330 ft), making it the tallest building in Ingushetia and the tallest observation tower in the North Caucasus.

== History ==
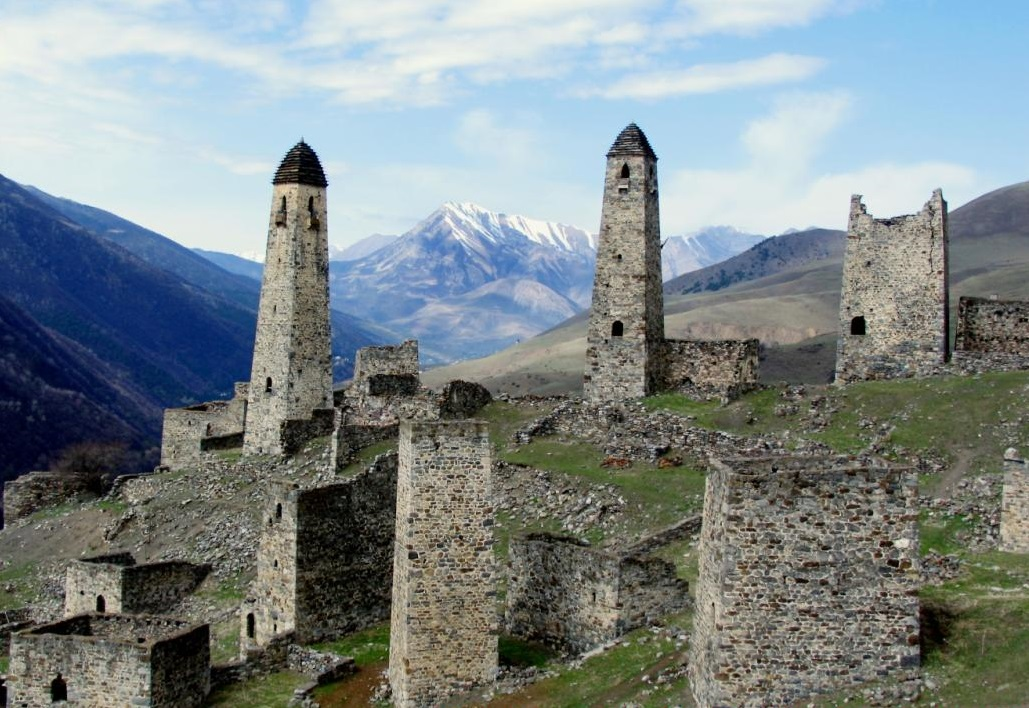
Medieval Ingush towers at Erzi

The construction of towers in the North Caucasus originated in ancient times, which is associated with the remains of megalithic cyclopean dwellings (ca. II-I millennium BC), found on the territory of the ancient Ingush villages of Targim, Khamkhi, Egikal, Doshkhakle, Kart, and others. In the Middle Ages, a period of revival of the tower culture of the North Caucasus began, the phenomenon of which, according to researchers, mostly manifested in the mountains of Ingushetia, which was labeled by many as “the country of towers", to the extent that in 2022 the region's tourism committee announced that the Federal Service for Intellectual Property (Russia) patented the slogan "Ingushetia — Land of Towers".

Traditionally, each Ingush clan (teip) built one or several tower settlements. A tower was a reliable home, protection and personification of the unity of the entire family. The Tower of Concord was conceived as a unifying symbol for the entire Ingush people.

== Construction ==
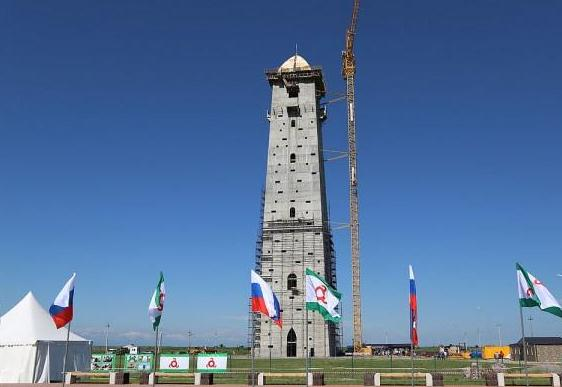
Construction in May 2013

The project was implemented at the expense of the personal funds of the businessman and philanthropist Alikhan Kharsiev. Construction began in 2012. At the same time, the norms of the ancient Ingush custom of building the tower were taken into account, according to which its construction must be completed within 365 days. Thus, the construction of the building from the foundation to the pyramidal roof (Ingush: malkha tkhov) was completed in 2013.

=== Design and development ===
Local artists were invited to create paintings to decorate the walls inside the tower, in combination with specially selected lighting to give the building its own character and individuality. The paintings recreate the images of famous heroes of Ingush mythology: Koloy-Kant, Seska-Solsa and others, while other images depict the Amazons, Sarmatians and Sumerians. Other paintings depict the recent past of Ingushetia (Battle of the Caucasus, Deportation, etc.). In the ethnographic museum on the ground floor, the life of a traditional home is recreated.

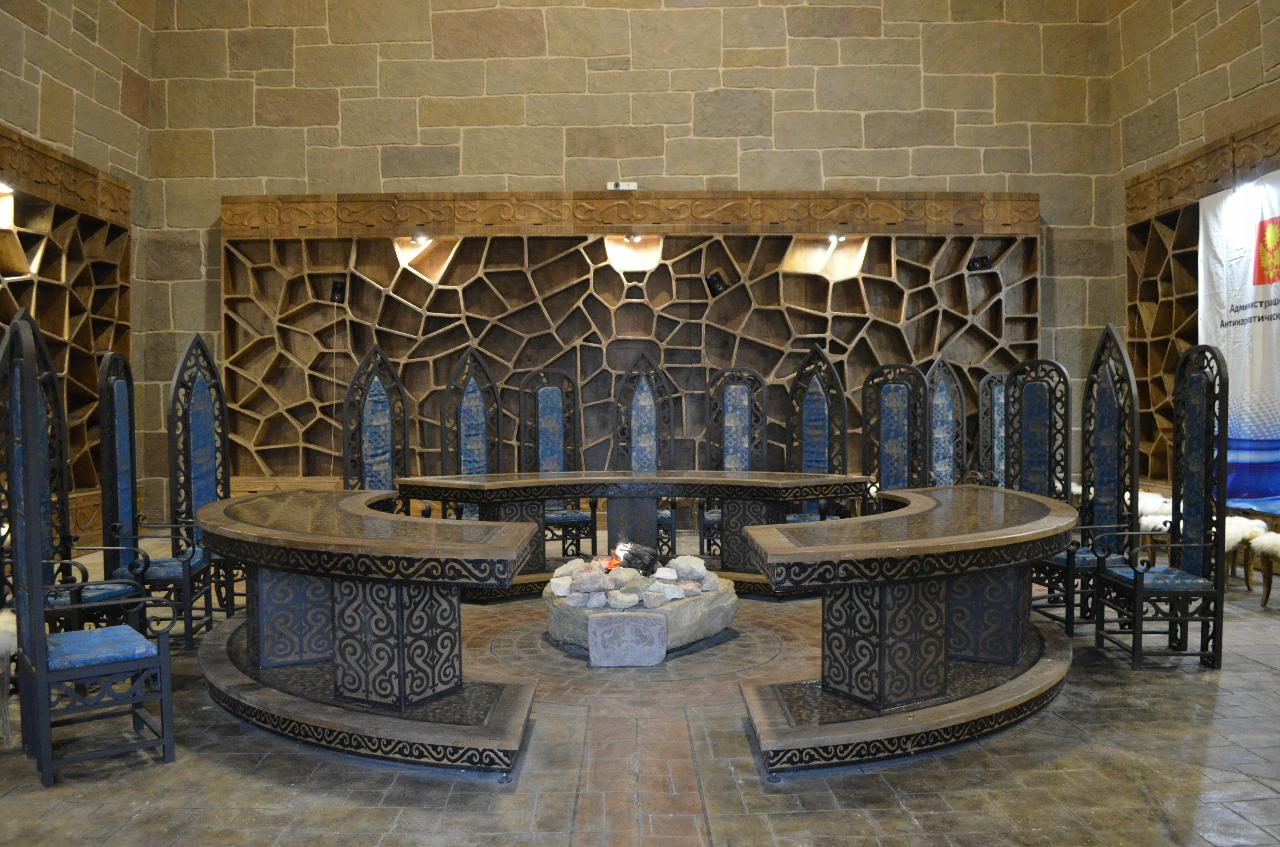
Meeting room on the ground floor

The floor plan of the tower make it possible to hold various cultural events, scientific conferences, in particular, readings, meetings of the Council of Teips (Meḣk-Kḣel), youth forums, etc. A national-style cafe and an ethnographic museum are located on separate floors. The multifunctional monument plays an important role in the consolidation of the Ingush society, since it belongs not to one clan, as was the case many centuries ago, but to all residents of Ingushetia. At an altitude of 85 meters the towers has an observation deck made of super-resistant glass, from which a panorama of the city of Magas and the surrounding area opens up. To get to the observation deck, one is required to walk more than a kilometer along a spiral ramp since there is no elevator.

An underground restaurant, a small shopping center and a parking lot on the square by the tower are set to be built. According to architect Sergei Tkachenko, the possibility of constructing another high-rise building of a different style with functional premises (toilets, elevator) close to the tower with a high-rise passage between the two buildings is being considered.

== Gallery ==
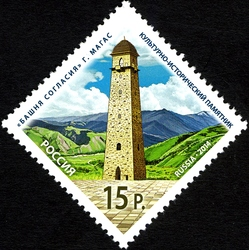
Russian post stamp with the image of the Tower of Concord

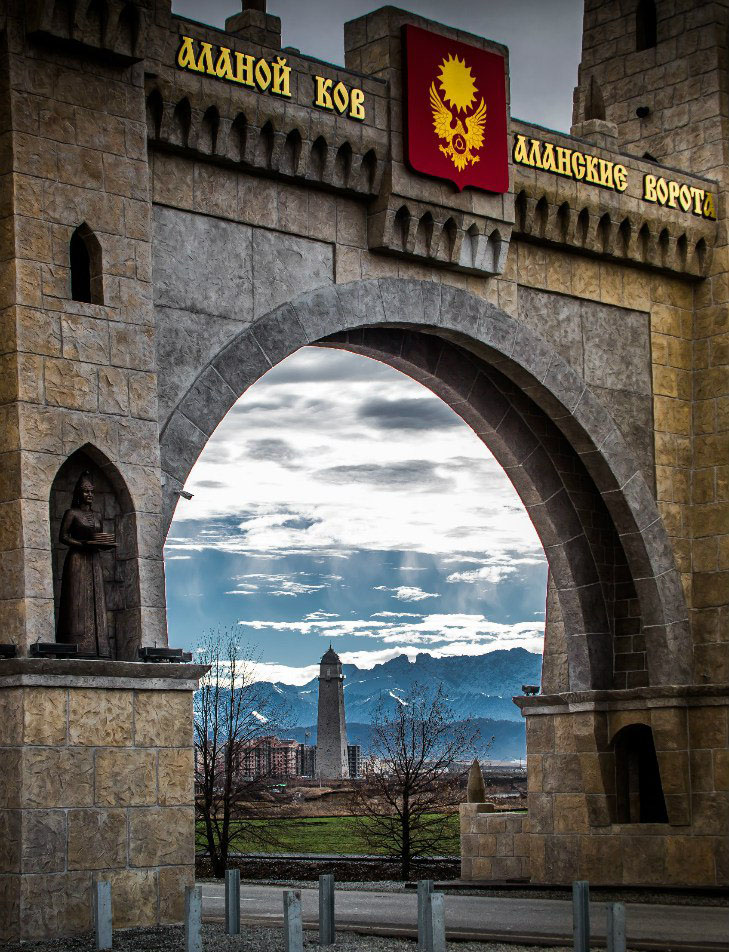
View of the Tower of Concord through the arch of the Alanian Gates at the entrance of Magas

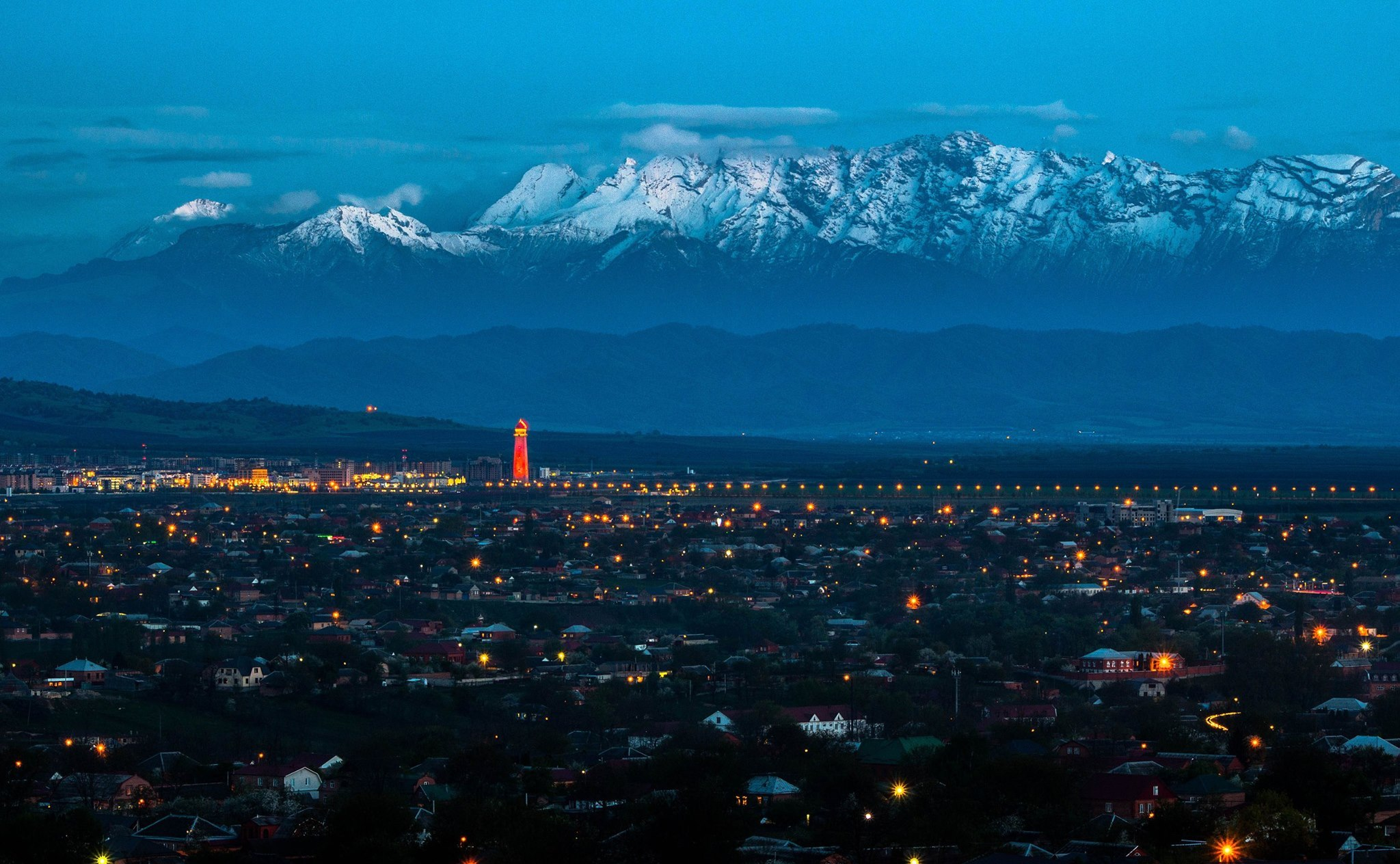
View of Magas, Ali Yurt and Ekazhevo

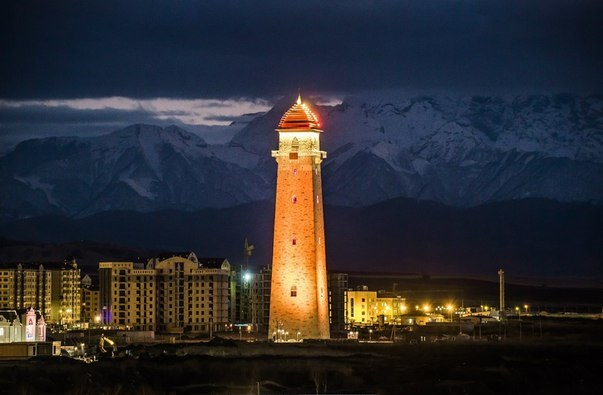
Nighttime illumination of the Tower of Concord

== See also ==
- Ingush towers
- Nine Towers

== Sources ==
- Chakhkiev, Djabrail (2003). Древности Горной Ингушетии [Antiquities of Mountainous Ingushetia] (in Russian). Vol. 1. Minvody: Kavkazskaya zdravnitsa.
- Basilov, Vladimir; Kobychev, Veniamin (1971). "Галгай — страна башен" [Galgai: country of towers] (PDF). Советская этнография (in Russian) (3). Moscow: Nauka: 120–135.
- Dolgieva, Maryam; Kartoev, Magomet; Kodzoev, Nurdin; Matiev, Timur (2013). Kodzoev, Nurdin; et al. (eds.). История Ингушетии [History of Ingushetia] (4th ed.). Rostov-Na-Donu: Yuzhnyy izdatelsky dom. pp. 1–600. ISBN 978-5-98864-056-1.
- Tarakanova, Marina (2023). Самые лучшие места России и мира 4D [The best places in Russia and the world 4D] (in Russian). Nalchik: Mezhizdat. pp. 1–160. ISBN 978-5-17-152205-6.
- Targimov, Hussein (2023-01-05). "Комитет по туризму региона получил патент на использование слогана "Ингушетия — родина башен"" [The region's tourism committee received a patent for the use of the slogan "Ingushetia—the birthplace of towers"]. Ingushetia (in Russian).
