= Nine Towers =

Memorial in Nazran, Ingushetia

Nine Towers Memorial
- Ийс гӏала
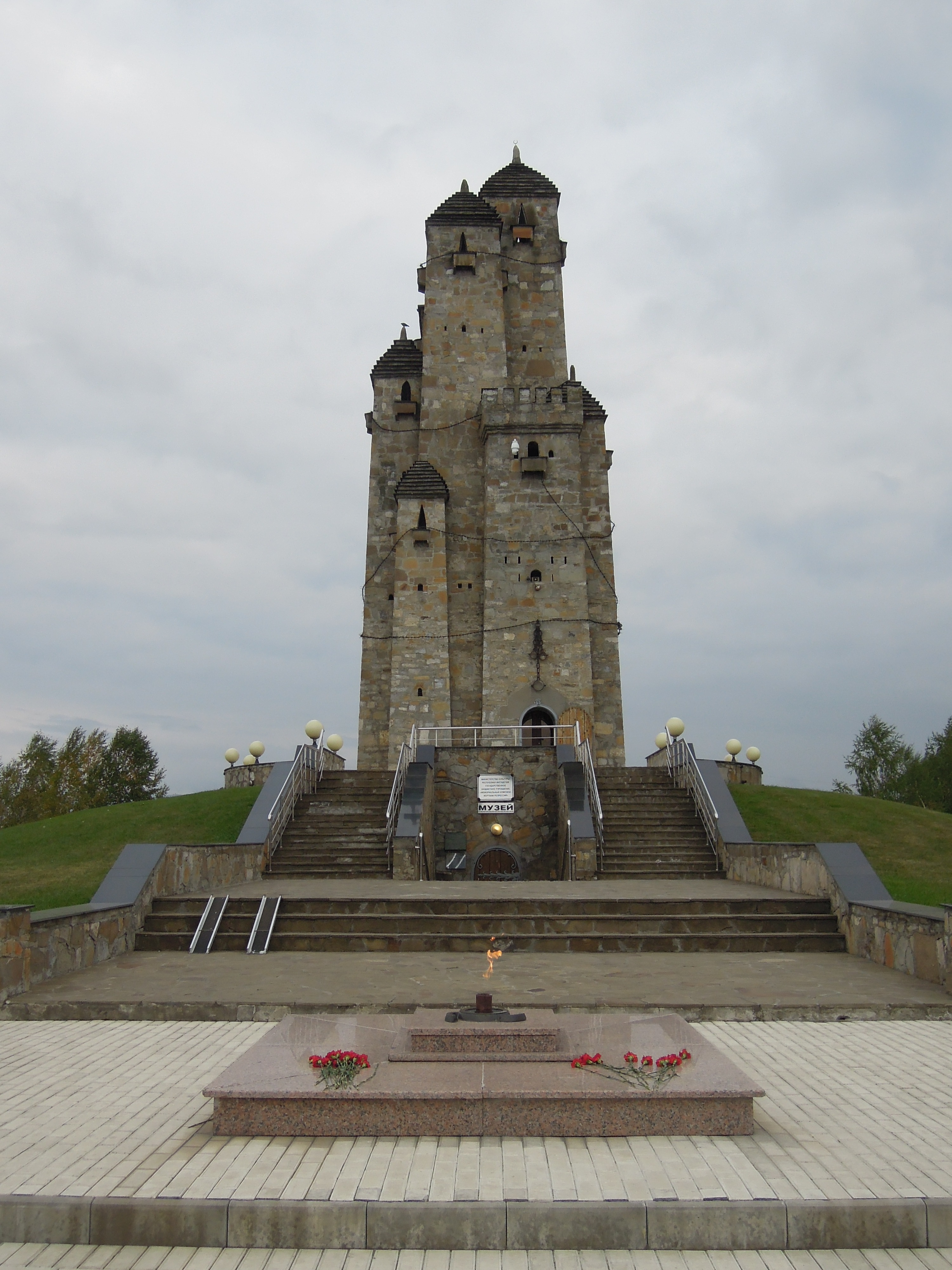
- 43°11′49″N 44°46′17″E
- Location: Nazran, Republic of Ingushetia, Russia
- Designer: Murad Polonkoev
- Type: Memorial
- Beginning date: 1996
- Completion date: 1997
- Opening date: 23 February 1997
- Dedicated to: Victims of political repression in the Soviet Union

The "Nine Towers" Memorial (Ingush: Ийс гӏала, Russian: Девять башен) is a memorial building located in Nazran, Republic of Ingushetia, dedicated to the victims of genocide and political repression in the Soviet Union. It is the main structure of the entire memorial complex, which displays the most significant dates, tragic and solemn events in the history of the Ingush people.

The memorial and museum were opened on February 23, 1997, on the commemoration of the Deportation of Chechens and Ingush to Kazakhstan and Central Asia.

== Description ==
The memorial is built in the form of 9 Ingush towers assembled together, bound by barbed wire and chains to represent the suffering of the Ingush. This memorial complex also contains a museum which has exhibitions illustrating the deportation as well as markers for prominent Ingush and local police forces who died in the line of service, photographic documents, materials, paintings, household items, etc., testifying to the Stalinist Deportations, as well as the ethnic cleansing of the Ingush during the East Prigorodny conflict. The central tower has 4 floors, its height is 25 meters. Each of the towers reflects the architecture of different historical eras of the Ingush people. An eternal flame burns in front of the memorial as a symbol of the eternal memory of the innocent victims of the deportation of the Ingush people in 1944. At the base of the Nine Towers monument on the south side is a collection of headstones or steles (Ingush: churtash). After the deportation of the Ingush, their cemeteries were destroyed and the headstones were taken from graves and used in construction. After the Ingush returned, as it was no longer possible to tell from what graves the stones were taken, they found and gathered up many of these headstones and created both formal and informal memorials to the Deportation.

== History ==
The author of the project Murad Polonkoev, a Merited Artist of the Russian Federation, was awarded the gold medal of the Russian Academy of Arts for this project in 2002. The “Nine Towers” Memorial is an architectural monument included in the register of the Academy of Arts of the Russian Federation and since 2002 in the catalog “Monument and memorial signs to victims of repression on the territory of the former USSR” of the Sakharov Center named after human rights activist and Nobel Peace Prize laureate Andrei Sakharov.

== Events ==
Memorable dates and annual events organized by the museum:

- February 23 — Remembrance day for the victims of the Deportation of the Ingush People
- May 18 — International Museum Day
- October 30 — Remembrance day for victims of Political Repression

== Gallery ==
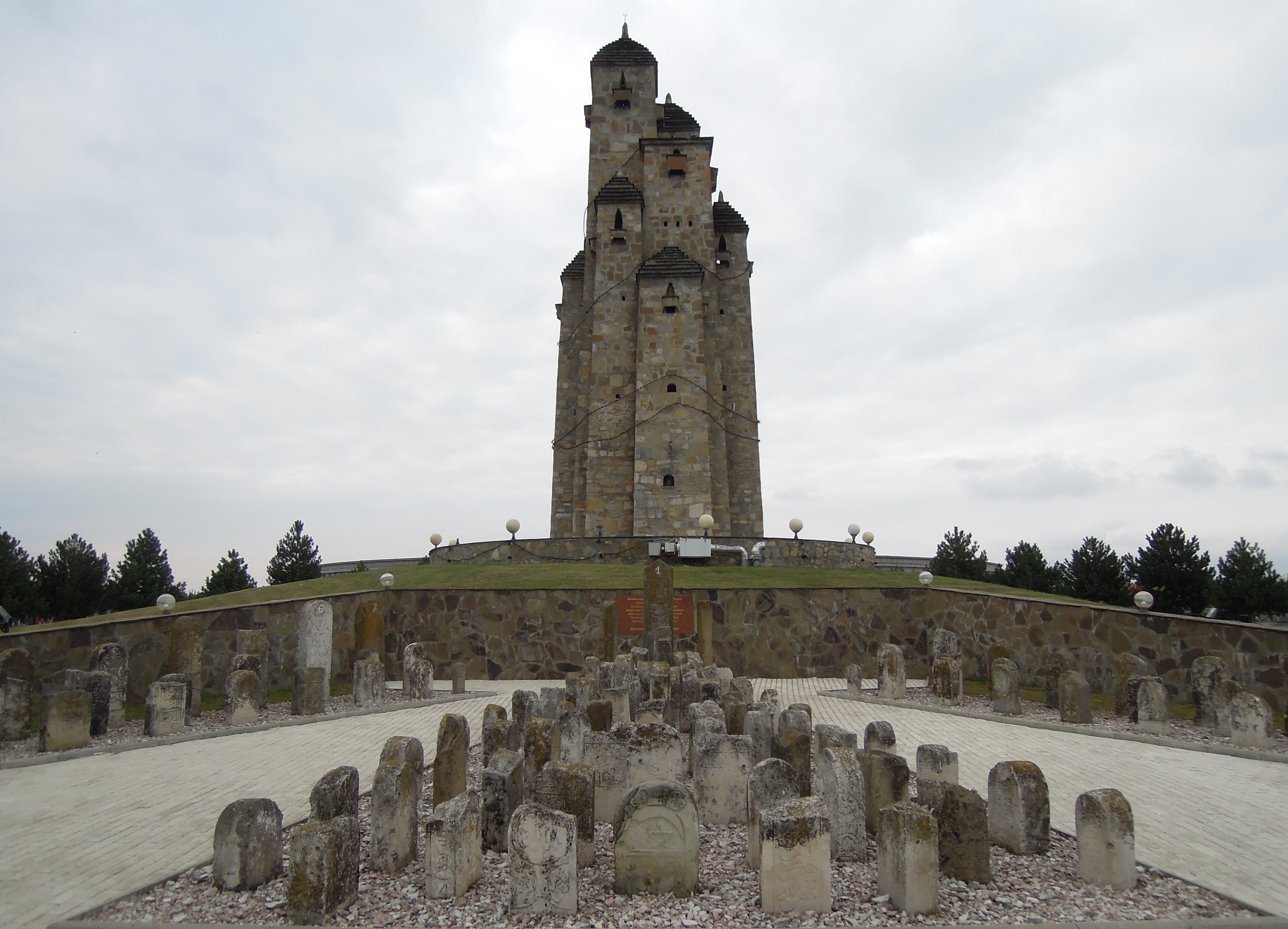
Memorial cemetery on the south side of the Nine Towers

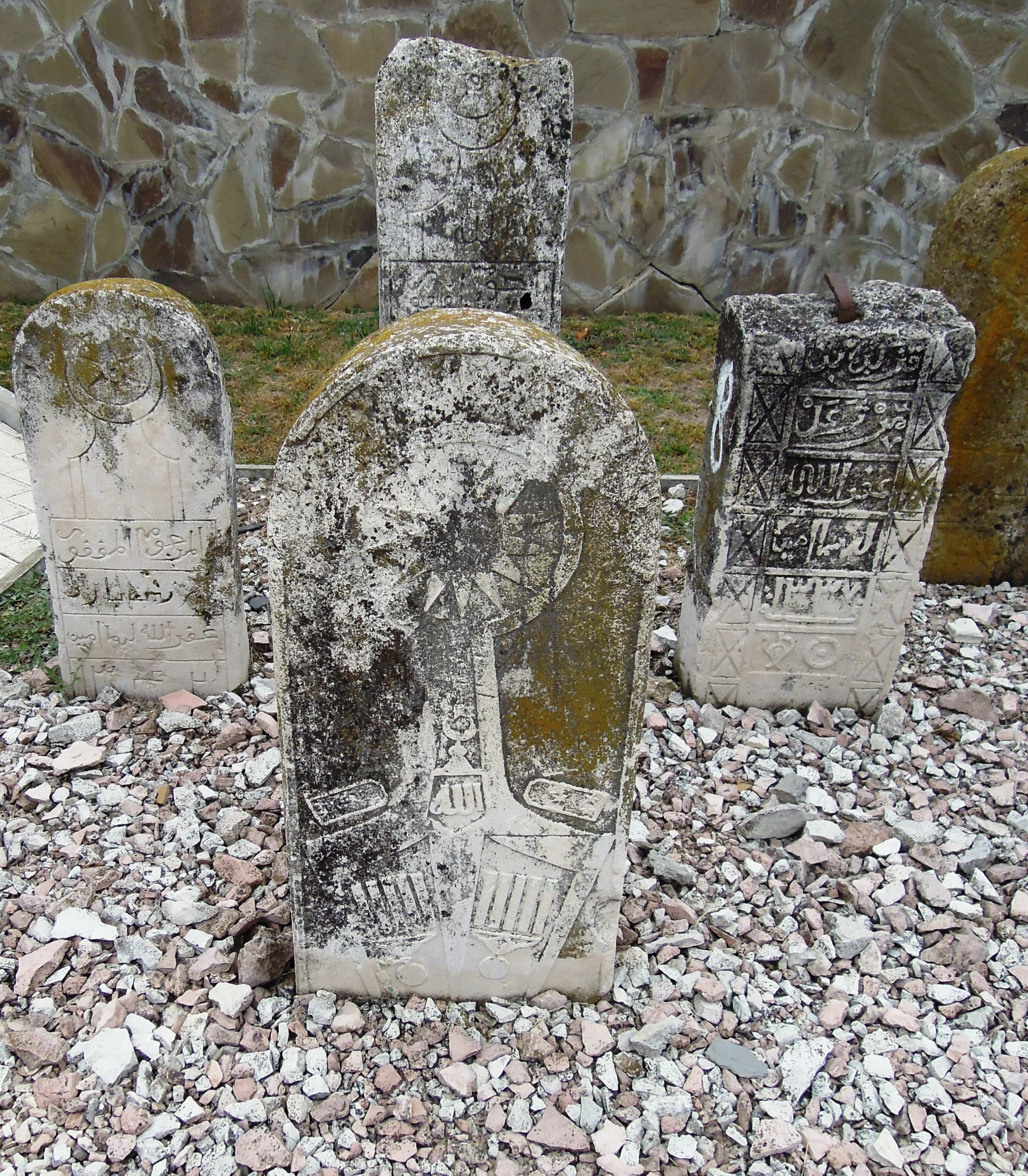
Display of steles collected from gravestones removed from Ingush cemeteries during the deportation

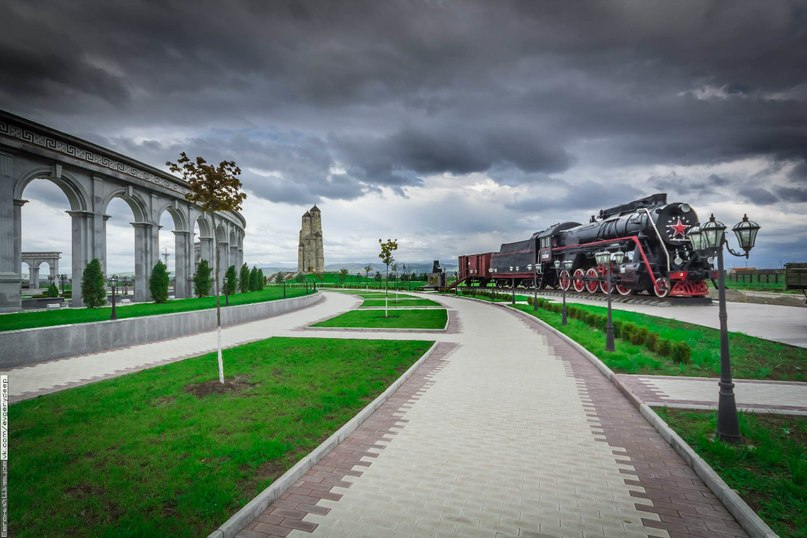
Monument-train from the time of the deportation of the Ingush people in 1944

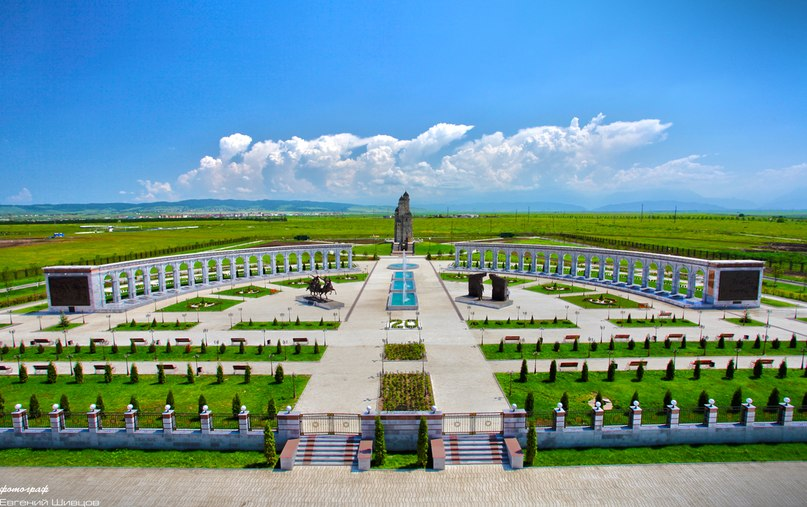
View of the Memorial of Remembrance and Glory

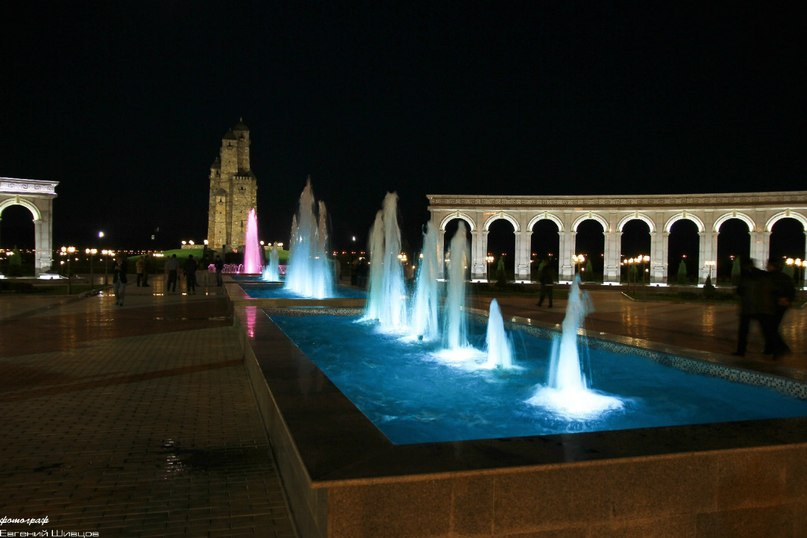
Nighttime view of the Nine Towers from the fountains

== See also ==
- Ingush towers
- Tower of Concord
