= Djabrail Chahkiev =

Soviet and russian historian

- Чахкенаькъан Жабраил
- Pronunciation: Russian pronunciation: [d͡ʐʐəbrəɪɫ t͡ɕɪxʲkʲɪ(j)ɪf]
- Born: 21 May 1955
- Died: 8 January 2024 (aged 68)
- Education: Chechen-Ingush State University (1979)
- Father: Yury (Yunus)
- Scientific career
- Fields: Archaeology, history, weapons science, ethnography, archival science
- Workplaces: Chechen-Ingush State University; Chechen-Ingush Scientific and Research Institute of History, Language and Literature; Ingush State University

Djabrail Yurievich Chahkiev (Note: Russian: Джабраил Юрьевич Чахкиев, IPA: [dʐəbrɐˈiɫ jʉrʲˈjevʲɪt͡ɕ t͡ɕɐxˈkʲi(j)ɪf]; Ingush: Чахкенаькъан Юнаса Жабраил, romanized: Chakhkenäqhan Yunasa Zhabrail) (21 May 1955 – 8 January 2024) was a Soviet and Russian historian, archaeologist, weapons expert, ethnographer, archivist, candidate of historical sciences, Deputy Head of the State Archive Service of the Republic of Ingushetia.

After graduating from the Faculty of History of the Checheno-Ingush State University, Chahkiev worked in various government agencies like as a referent of the republican society "Knowledge", actively collaborating with local history museums in Grozny and Nazran and combining activities with work at the Chechen-Ingush and Ingush State Universities, as well as in the State Archive Service of the Republic Ingushetia. He gave preference to the study of the medieval history of military affairs and the armament of the population of Chechnya and Ingushetia in the 13th–18th centuries.

== Biography ==
Born 21 May 1955, Chahkiev graduated from the Faculty of History of the Checheno-Ingush State University. He actively collaborated with local history museums in Grozny and Nazran. He gave preference to the study of the medieval history of military affairs and the armament of the population of Chechnya and Ingushetia in the 13th-18th centuries.

In 1979, Chahkiev, like most young archaeologists of the republic, until he moved to the department of archeology and ethnography of the Chechen-Ingush Scientific and Research Institute of History, Language and Literature, did not have the opportunity to work as an archaeologist since there was no free workplace for archaeologists at the university, museum and republican society protection of monuments. Most young archaeological specialists, including those who were already practicing, worked in schools and boarding schools after graduating from university. Chahkiev was somewhat "lucky"—the position of a referent of the republican society "Knowledge" completely unexpectedly became vacant. While working there, he had trade union leave, which he used to explore the highlands of Chechnya and Ingushetia and, as a rule, on the "vacation pay" he received. In August of the same year, he led expeditions in which future doctors of historical sciences participated—K. Z. Makhmudova (Erzunkaeva), N. N. Baranichenko (Velikaya), S. V. Makhortykh, S. B. Burkov and others. The detachment specialized to a greater extent not in archaeological excavations, but in a consistent systematic survey of high-mountain territories with their numerous architectural and archaeological monuments and their subsequent registration with the state and protection.

In 1982 Chahkiev defended his candidate thesis on the topic "Weapons and issues of military art of the late medieval Vainakhs of the 13th-18th centuries" at Moscow State University. It was devoted to the study of the military art of the late medieval Chechens and Ingush.

Chahkiev contributed largely to the formation and development of archival affairs in Ingushetia. Since 1998, he worked as deputy head of the State Archive Service of Ingushetia, and since 2015—deputy director of the State Institution "State Archive of Ingushetia". Founder since the 1990s, he worked at the Ingush State University where he taught archaeology, medieval history and archaeological practice.

Chahkiev died after a short illness on 8 January 2024, at the age of 68.

== Works ==
- Akhmadov, Yavuz; Khasbulatov, Aslanbek; Khasbulatova, Zulay; Khasiev, Said-Magomed; Chahkiev, Djabrail (1994). "Чеченцы" [Chechens]. In Tishkov, Valery; et al. (eds.). Народы России : Энциклопедия (in Russian). St. Petersburg: Great Russian Encyclopedia. pp. 399–403. ISBN 5-85270-082-7.
- Akhmadov, Yavuz; Khasbulatov, Aslanbek; Khasbulatova, Zulay; Khasiev, Said-Magomed; Chahkiev, Djabrail (1999). "Чеченцы" [Chechens]. In Tishkov, Valery; et al. (eds.). Народы и религии мира : Энциклопедия (in Russian). St. Petersburg: Great Russian Encyclopedia. pp. 622–624. ISBN 5-85270-155-6.
- Vinogradov, Vitaly; Chahkiev, Djabrail (January–February 1984). Chistov, Kirill; et al. (eds.). "Некоторые традиции военного искусства вайнахов в средневековье" [Some traditions of the military art of the Vainakhs in the Middle Ages] (PDF). Sovetskaya etnografia (in Russian) (1). Moscow: Nauka: 98–110.
- Vinogradov, Vitaly; Abdulwahabova, Birlant; Chahkiev, Djabrail (May–June 1985). Chistov, Kirill; et al. (eds.). ""Солнечный гребень" ингушских женщин (о парадном головном уборе кур-харс)" ["Solar comb" of Ingush women (about the ceremonial headdress kur-khars)]. Sovetskaya Etnografia (in Russian) (3). Moscow: Nauka: 104–114.
- Chahkiev, Djabrail (2005). "Чулхойцы" [Chulkhoians]. In Zhdanov, Yuri; et al. (eds.). Энциклопедия культур народов Юга России (in Russian). Vol. 1: Народы Юга России. Rostov-on-Don: NCSC of HS. pp. 235–236. ISBN 5-87872-089-2.

== Sources ==
- "Информация о составе педаг. (научно-педагогических) работников образовательной организации на 2018 год" [Information about the composition of the teaching staff (scientific and pedagogical) employees of educational organizations for 2018]. inggu.ru (in Russian).
- Narozhnyi, Evgeny (2020). "Историк, археолог-оружиевед, этнограф И архивист — Джабраил Юрьевич Чахкиев (65–летний юбилей ученого)" [Historian, archeologist and weapons expert, ethnographer and archivist — Djabrail Yurievich Chahkiev (65-anniversary of scientist)]. NAO "NasledieKubani" (in Russian) (18): 341–358.
- Patiev, Hussein (8 January 2024a). "Глава Ингушетии выразил соболезнования родным и близким ученого Джабраила Чахкиева" [The head of Ingushetia expressed condolences to the family and friends of the scientist Djabrail Chahkiev]. Ingushetia (in Russian).
- Patiev, Hussein (8 January 2024b). "Умер археолог, автор монографии "Древности горной Ингушетии" Джабраил Чахкиев" [Archaeologist, author of the monograph "Antiquities of Mountain Ingushetia" Djabrail Chahkiev has died]. Ingushetia (in Russian).
