= Byalgan =

Rural locality in Ingushetia

Byalgan Бялган
- Aul

Other transcription(s)
  - Ingush: Баьлгӏане
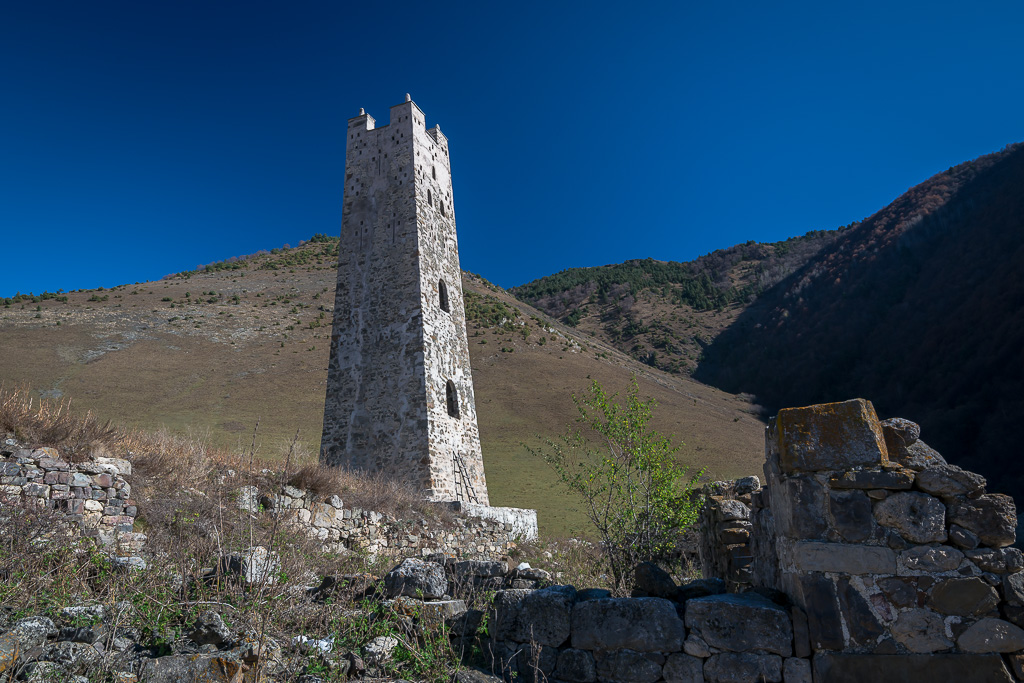
- Byalgan (post restoration)
- Interactive map of Byalgan
- Location of Byalgan Byalgan (Republic of Ingushetia)
- Coordinates: 42°47′55″N 44°47′21″E
- Country: Russia
- Federal subject: Ingushetia
- Founded: ca. 13-14th century

Population (2010 Census)
  - Total: 0
  - Estimate (2021): 0 )

Administrative status
  - Subordinated to: Dzheyrakhsky District
- Time zone: UTC+3 (MSK)
- OKTMO ID: 26620420111

Byalgan (Ingush: Баьлгӏане, romanized: Bälghane) is a medieval aul in the Dzheyrakhsky District of Ingushetia. It is part of the rural settlement (administrative center) of Olgeti.

== Geography ==
The village is located in the southern part of Ingushetia at a distance of about 9 kilometers in a straight line to the south-east from the regional center of Dzheyrakh.

== Archaeology ==
The battle tower of Byalgan is one of the oldest in mountainous Ingushetia. As a result of a radiocarbon study, scientists date the tower to 1298–1440. Radiocarbon dating was carried out in the US at the Center for Applied Radioisotope Research at the Georgia State University. For the tower, two samples were dated, taken from one core (No. D42A-10), obtained from a wooden element of the tower structure - the horizontal beam-lintel of the 3rd floor window. The beam is made of linden. The gap between two samples is 86 growth rings.

The tower was restored in 2013.

== Gallery ==
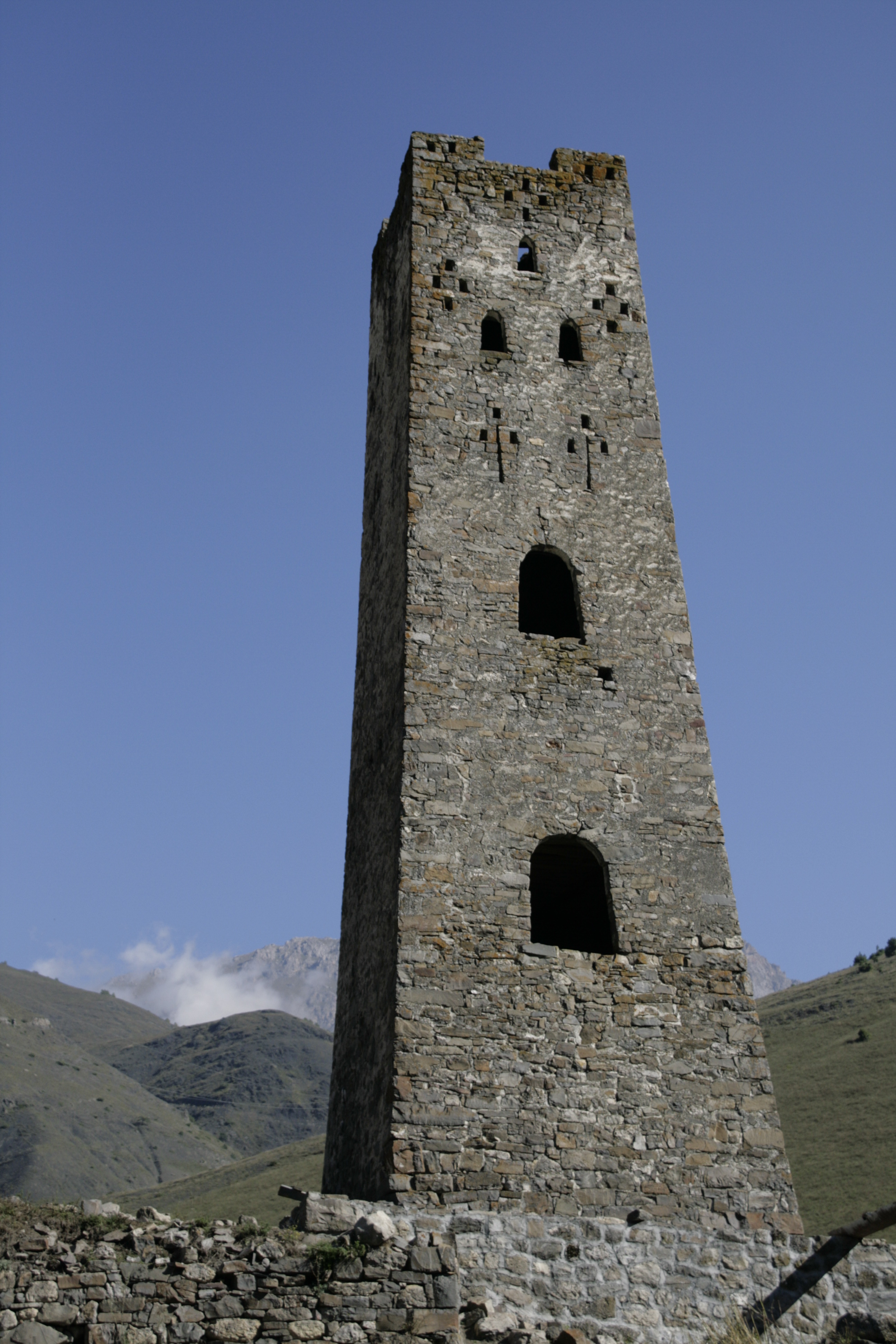
Battle tower of Byalgan

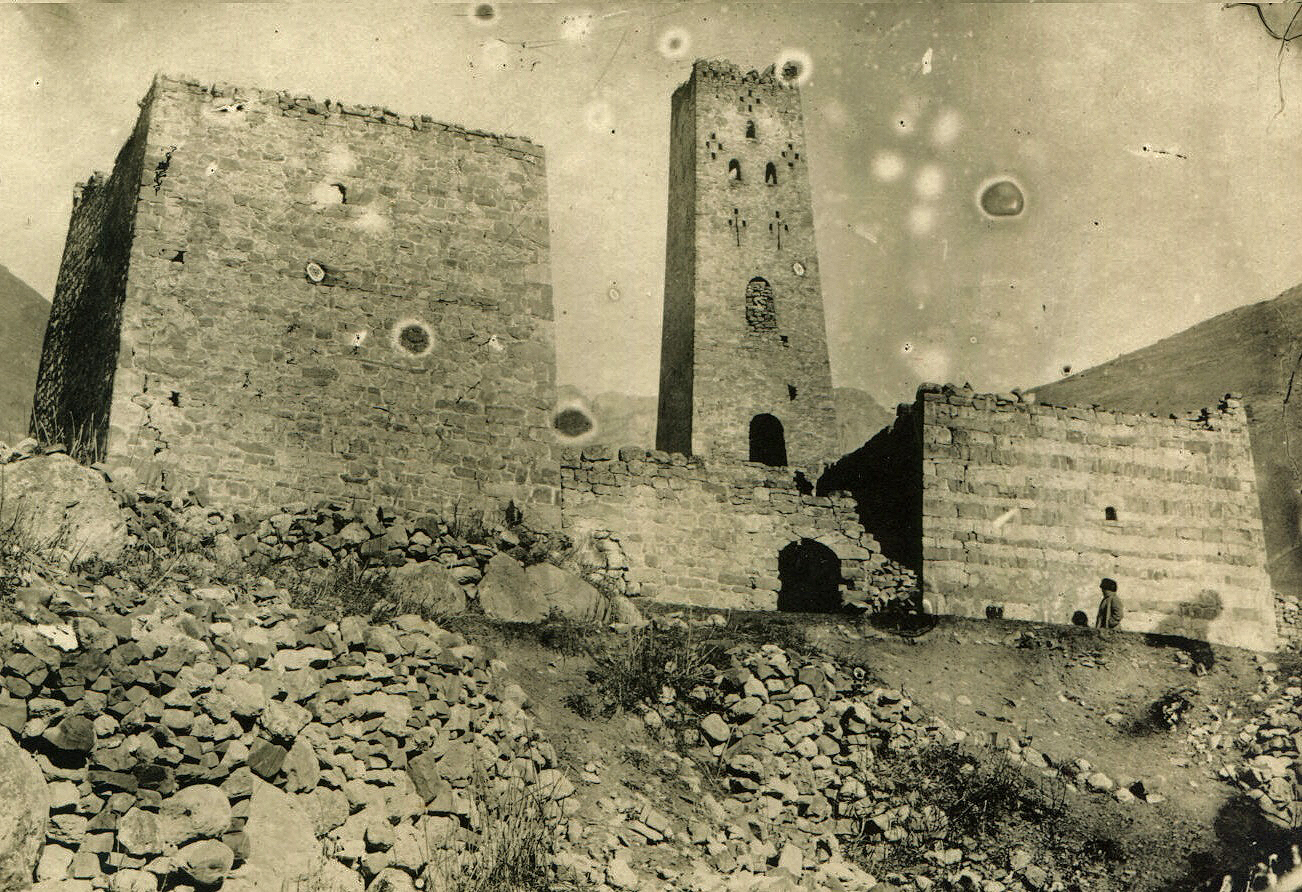
Byalgan in the early 20th century

== Bibliography ==
- Мальсагов, З. К. (1963). Оздоева, Ф. (ed.). Грамматика ингушского языка [Grammar of the Ingush language] (in Ingush and Russian). Vol. 5 (2nd ed.). Грозный: Чечено-Ингушское Книжное Издательство. pp. 1–164.
