= Kirill Chistov =

Soviet and Russian ethnologist (1919–2007)

Kirill Vasilievich Chistov
- Кирилл Васильевич Чистов
- Born: 20 November 1919; Detskoe Selo, Russian SFSR
- Died: 2007 (aged 87–88)
- Occupation: Ethnologist

Kirill Vasilievich Chistov (Russian: Кирилл Васильевич Чистов; 20 November 1919 – 2007), also credited as K.V. Chistov, was a Soviet and Russian ethnologist.

== Personal life ==
Kirill Vasilievich Chistov was born in Detskoe Selo, Russian Soviet Federative Socialist Republic on 20 November 1919. His paternal grandfather was a railroad engineer who died young, and his maternal grandfather worked in military and civilian medicine before also dying young. As a child, Chistov attended a school from which Nikolay Gumilyov graduated, and which was once directed by Innokenty Annensky. After secondary school, he attended Leningrad State University and studied under Dmitry Konstantinovich Zelenin and Mark Azadovsky. Chistov died in 2007.

== Career ==
Chistov was an ethnologist who specialized in Slavic folklore, and was a corresponding member of the Russian Academy of Sciences. In 2003, Chistov was awarded the S.F. Oldenburg Prize.
