= Guloykhi =

River in the Caucasus

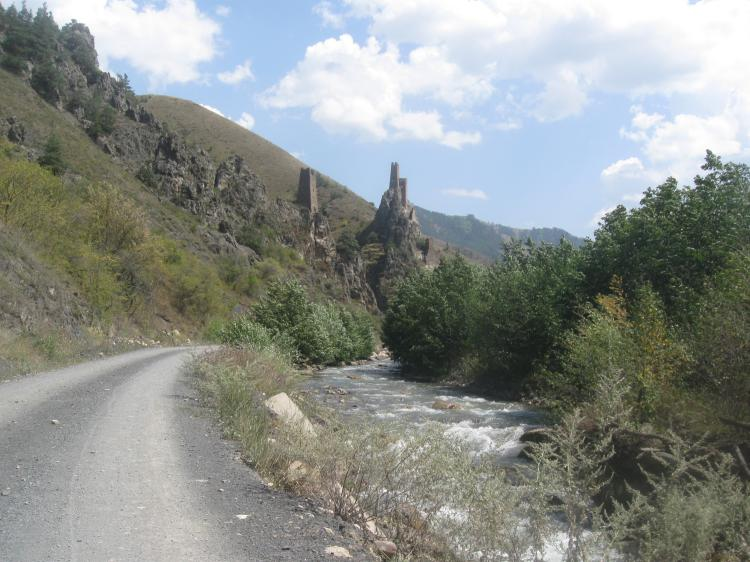

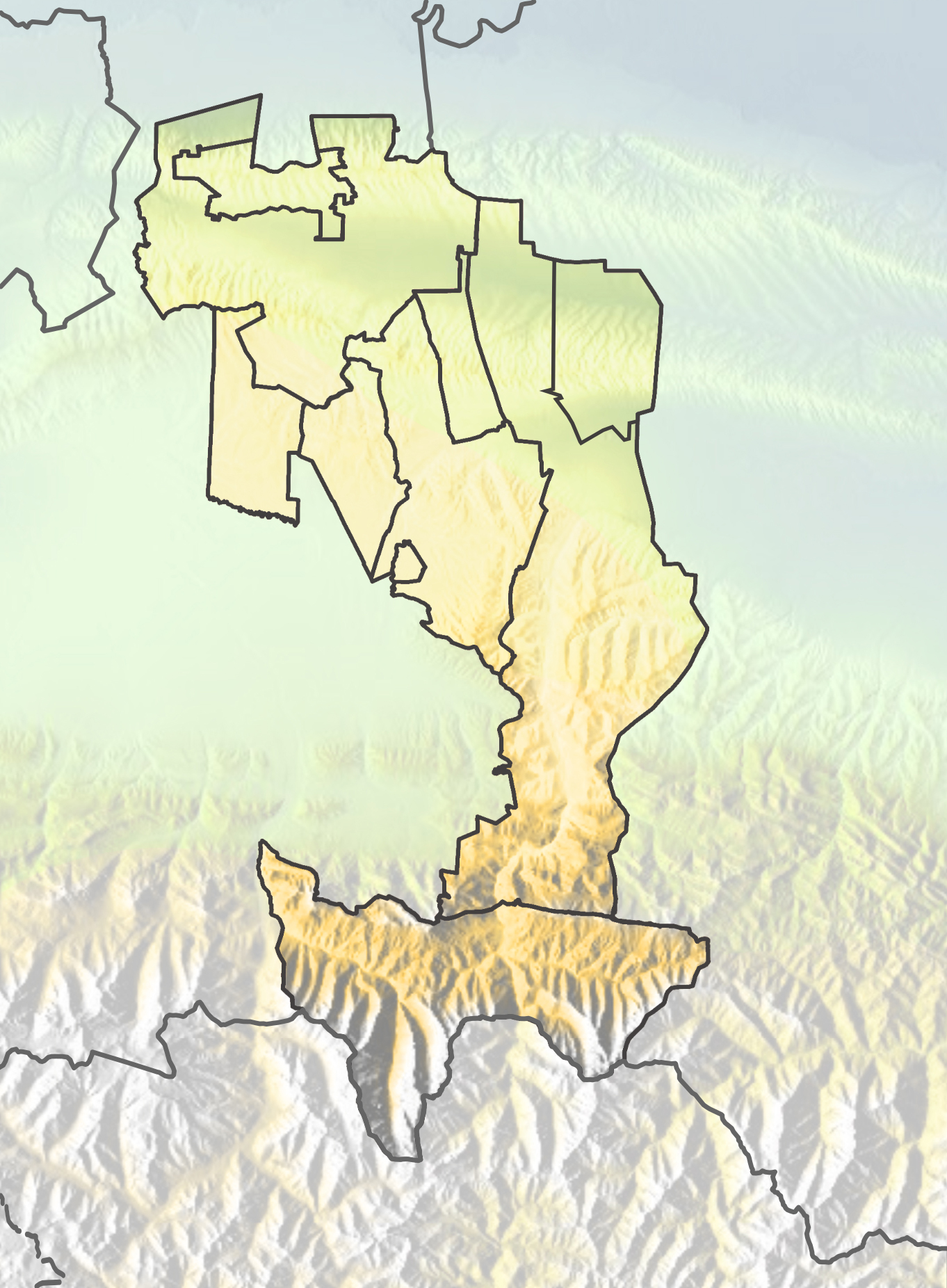
- Location within Caucasus Mountains Location within Republic of Ingushetia
- Native name: ГӀулой-хи (Ingush)

Location
- Country: Russian Federation
- Region: Caucasus
- Federal subject: Ingushetia

Physical characteristics
- Source
  - coordinates: 42°48′48″N 45°11′23″E
- Mouth: Assa River
  - location: 103 km on the right bank
  - coordinates: 42°48′20″N 44°56′09″E
  - elevation: 1,112 m (3,648 ft)
- Length: 24 km (15 mi)
- Basin size: 161 km^{2} (62 mi^{2})

Guloykhi, or Guloy-khi (Ingush: ГӀулой-Хий, romanized: Ghuloy-Khiy) is a river in the Dzheyrakhsky District of the Republic of Ingushetia, a right tributary of the Assa River.

== Geography ==
The Guloykhi river originates in the eastern part of mountainous Ingushetia. It flows west along a mountain valley near several medieval tower settlements, most notably Gul, Läzhg, Qoyrakh, Abali, Vovnushki, Koki, and flows into the Assa near Puy and Tkhaba-Yerdy. A forest mainly covers the left bank of the river. The speed of the flow is 2.2 m/s. The mouth of the river is located 103 km along the right bank of the Assa at an altitude of 1112 meters above sea level.

== Bibliography ==
- "Реестр зарегистрированных в АГКГН географических названий объектов на 17.12.2021: Республика Ингушетия" [Register of registered in AGKGN geographical names of objects as of 12/17/2021: Republic of Ingushetia] (in Russian).
- Volkova, N. G. (1974). Gardanov, V. K. (ed.). Этнический состав населения Северного Кавказа в XVIII — начале XX века [Ethnic composition of the population of the North Caucasus in the 18th – early 20th centuries] (in Russian). Moskva: Nauka. pp. 1–276.
