= Targim =

Rural locality in Ingushetia

Targim Таргим
- Aul

Other transcription(s)
  - Ingush: Тӏаргам (Note: • Commonly mentioned as 'Thargam' (Ingush: Тӏаргам), however the village was sometimes mentioned as 'Thargim' (Ingush: Thærgim) or 'Thargime' (Ingush: ТIаргиме).)
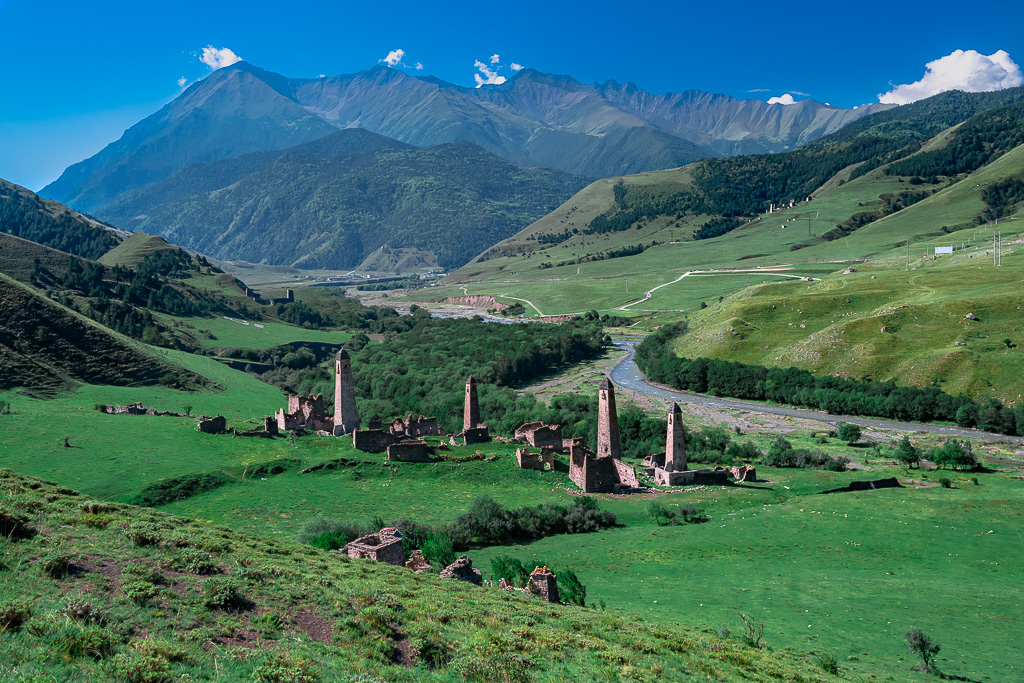
- Interactive map of Targim
- Location of Targim Targim (Republic of Ingushetia)
- Coordinates: 42°50′06″N 44°56′33″E
- Country: Russia
- Federal subject: Ingushetia
- Elevation: 1,080 m (3,540 ft)

Population (2010 Census)
  - Total: 7
  - Estimate (2024): 9 (+28.6%)

Administrative status
  - Subordinated to: Dzheyrakhsky District
- Time zone: UTC+3 (MSK)
- Postal code: 386433
- OKTMO ID: 26620450196

Targim (Ingush: Тӏаргам, romanized: Thargam) is a city-settlement (aul) in the Dzheyrakhsky District of Ingushetia. It is part of the rural settlement (administrative center) of Guli. The territory of the settlement is included in the Dzheyrakh-Assa State Historical-Architectural and Natural Museum-Reserve and is under state protection.

== Nomenclature ==
Some researchers associate Thargam (Targim) with the name of the legendary Thargamos. A. Suleymanov believed that "Thargam" could mean "shield".

== Geography ==
Targim is located in the south of Ingushetia, on the right bank of the Assa River in the Targim basin. It lies at an elevation of 1,080 metres above sea level. Nearby settlements include: Egikal to the northwest, Barkhane to the west, Khamkhi to the southwest, and Gureti to the south.

== History ==
On the territory of Targim, remains of megalithic cyclopean dwellings dating back to the 2nd–1st millennium BC have been discovered. According to legend, the tower fortresses of Targim, Egikal and Khamkhi, located in the valley of Ghalghaï Koashke (“Ghalghaï outposts”), were founded by three brothers, the sons of the legendary Alby (in other sources "Gha"). The youngest of them was Targim (Thargam), who settled across the Assa River.

In the second half of the 18th century (1770s), the German researcher J.A. Güldenstädt listed Targim among the total number of Ingush villages and districts.

== Gallery ==
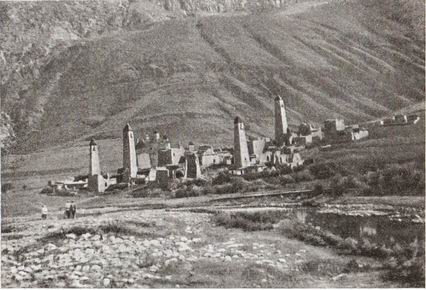
Targim, 1929

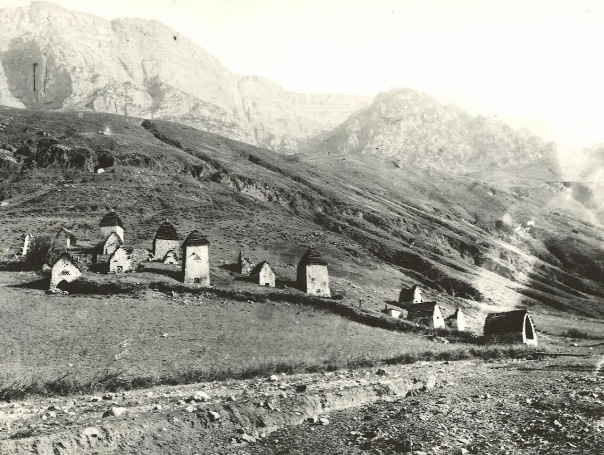
Crypt burial ground in Targim, 1921

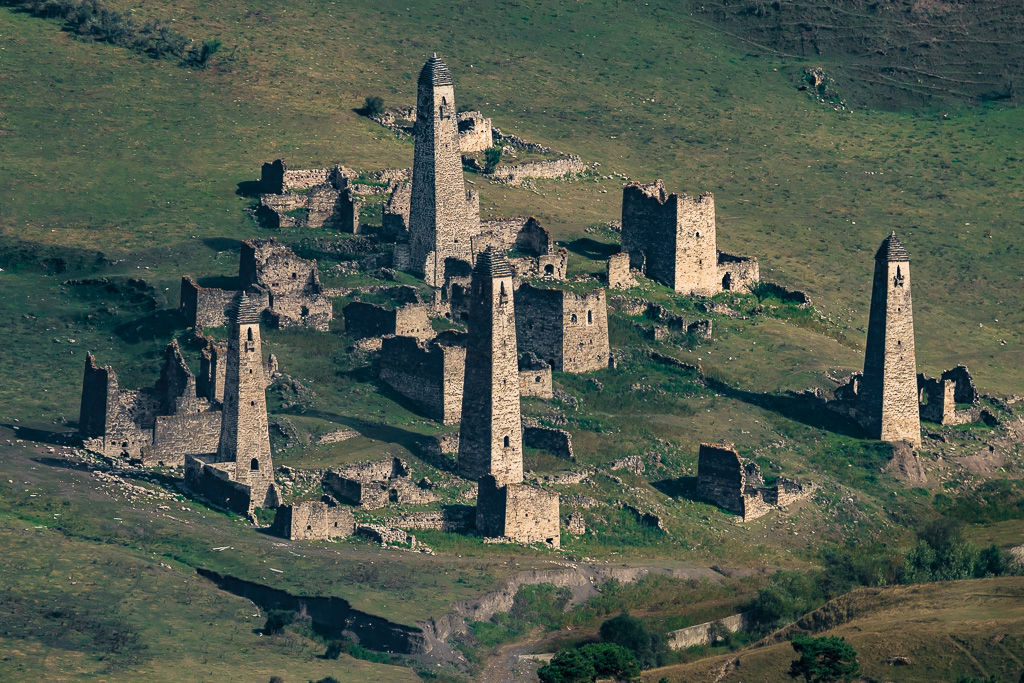

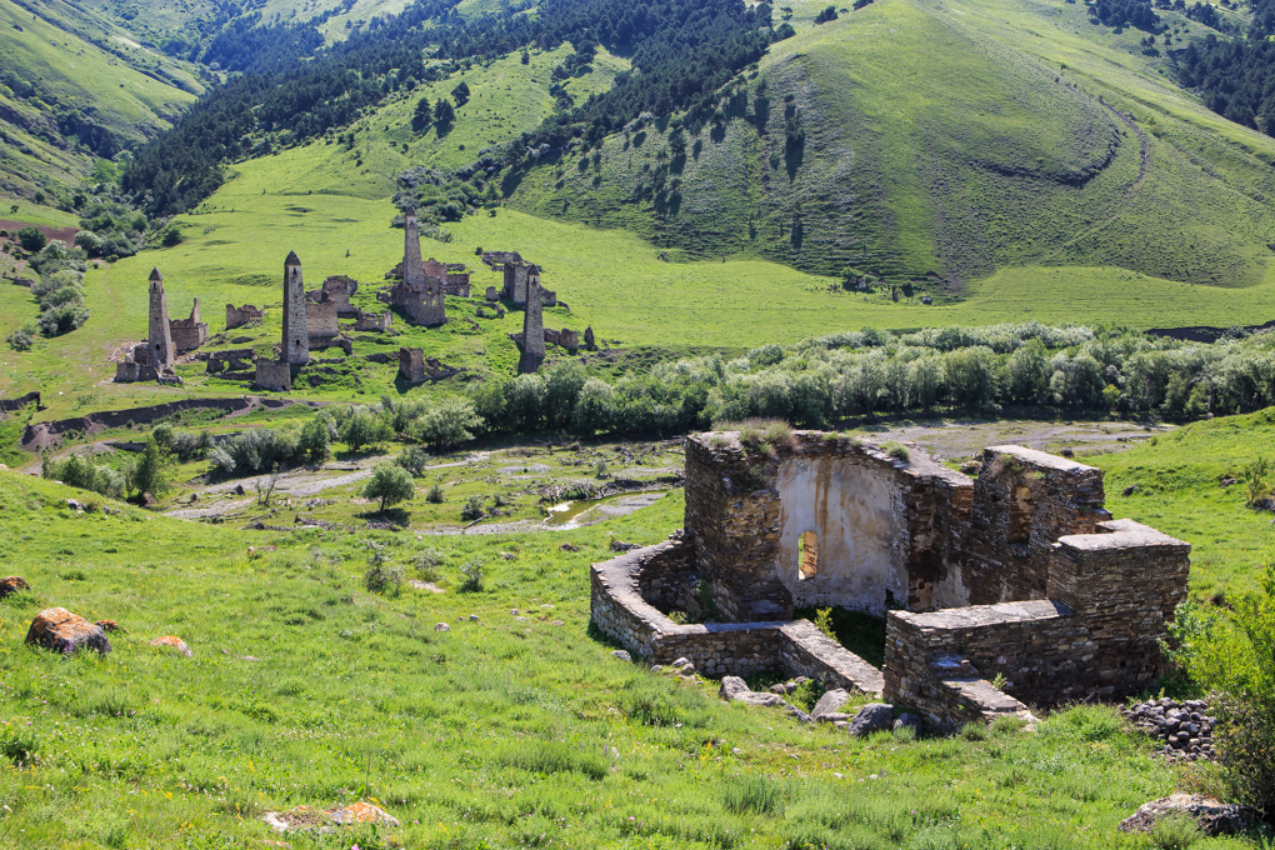
Alby-Yerdy Temple near Targim

== Bibliography ==
- Барахоева, Н. М.; Кодзоев, Н. Д.; Хайров, Б. А. (2016). Ингушско-русский словарь терминов [Ingush-Russian dictionary of terms] (in Ingush and Russian) (2 ed.). Нальчик: ООО «Тетраграф». pp. 1–288.
- Кодзоев, Н. Д. (2021). Хайрова, Р. Р. (ed.). Русско-ингушский словарь [Russian-Ingush dictionary] (in Ingush and Russian). Ростов-на-Дону. pp. 1–656. ISBN 978-5-906785-55-8.
- Ужахов, М. Г. (1927). Ингушско-русский словарик [Ingush-Russian dictionary] (in Ingush and Russian). Владикавказ: Крайнациздат. pp. 1–185.
- Мальсагов, З. К. (1963). Оздоева, Ф. (ed.). Грамматика ингушского языка [Grammar of the Ingush language] (in Ingush and Russian). Vol. 5 (2nd ed.). Грозный: Чечено-Ингушское Книжное Издательство. pp. 1–164.
- Чахкиев, Д. Ю. (2003). Древности Горной Ингушетии [Antiquities of Mountainous Ingushetia] (in Russian). Vol. 1. Назрань.
- Яндиев, М.А. (2007). Древние общественно-политические институты народов Северного Кавказа [Ancient Socio-Political Institutions of the Peoples of the North Caucasus] (in Russian). Мосвка: ЛКИ. ISBN 978-5-382-00285-9.
- Сулейманов, А. С. (1978). Шайхиев, А. Х. (ed.). Топонимия Чечено-Ингушетии [Toponymy of Checheno-Ingushetia] (in Russian). Vol. 2: Горная Ингушетия (юго-запад) и Чечня (центр и юго-восток). Грозный: Чечено-Ингушское Книжное Издательство. pp. 1–233.
- Гюльденштедт, Иоганн Антон (2002). "VI. Провинция Кистия, или Кистетия" [VI. Province of Kistia, or Kistetia]. In Карпов, Ю. Ю. (ed.). Путешествие по Кавказу в 1770-1773 гг. [Journey through the Caucasus in 1770-1773.] (in Russian). Translated by Шафроновской, Т. К. Санкт-Петербург: Петербургское Востоковедение. pp. 238–243. ISBN 5-85803-213-3.
