= Dzheyrakh-Assa Museum-Reserve =

Dzheyrakh-Assa State Historical, Architectural and Natural Museum-Reserve
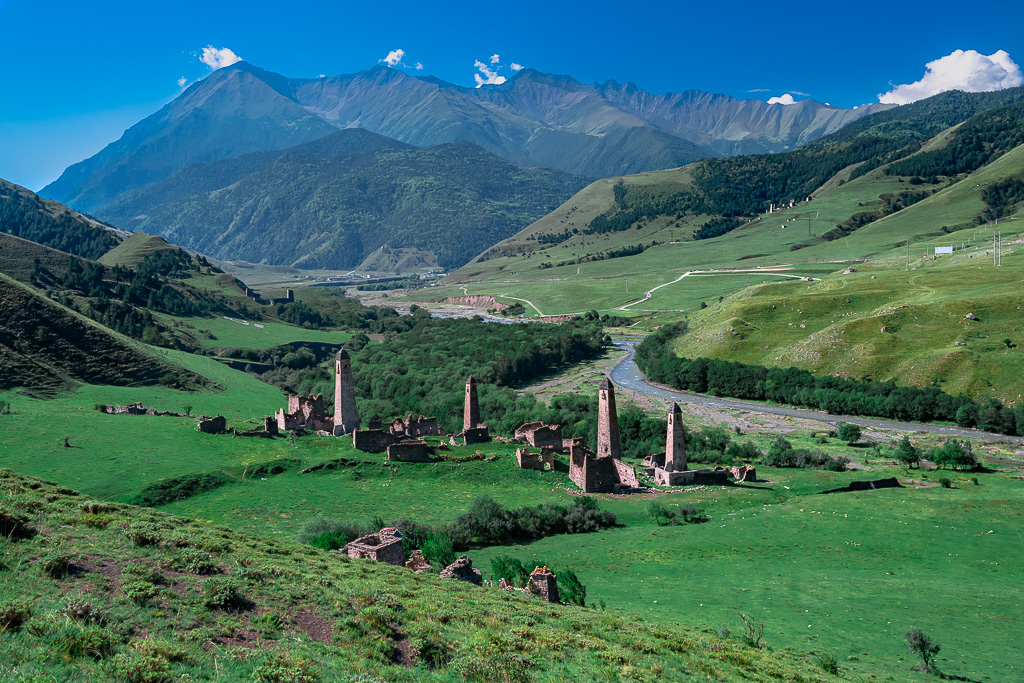
- Location: Dzheyrakhsky district, Ingushetia, Russia

Dzheyrakh-Assa Museum-Reserve (Russian: Джейрахско-Ассинский музей-заповедник) is a Ingush cultural and historical landscape in Ingushetia, consisting of a number of reserves and auls. In the territory of 64 thousand hectares there are about five hundred stone architectural complexes: Ingush towers and funerary crypts, Pagan and Christian shrines and temples. The first towers date back to the II millennium BC.

There are about 2,000 inhabitants in Dzheyrakhsky district of Ingushetia.

Noteworthy places of Assa-Dzheyrakh:

- Erzi (Боевые башни Эрзи) is a state nature reserve, includes one of the largest tower complexes of Ingushetia.
- Tower complex Vovnushki (Башенный комплекс Вовнушки) is a late medieval complex of defensive Ingush towers. In 2008 Vovnushki became the finalist of the project Seven Wonders of Russia.
- Tower complex Targim (Башенный комплекс Таргим) is an aul in Dzheyrakhsky district of Ingushetia, is located in the Targim basin, on the right bank of the river Assa.
- Tkhaba-Yerdy (Тхаба-ерды) is an early medieval Christian temple in Dzheyrakhsky district of Ingushetia, between the aul of Khairah and Pui of Assin gorge, not far from the border with Georgia.
- Alby-Yerdy (Ingush: Альби-Ерды) are the ruins of an early medieval temple in Ingushetia, located on the left bank of the Assa River.
- Tower complex Egikal (Башенный комплекс Эгикхал) is an aul in the Dzheyrakhsky district of Ingushetia. On its territory, there are many historical objects, including ancient burial grounds. One of the military towers with a height of 27 meters was preserved in almost perfect condition.

Since 1996 Dzheyrakh-Assa Museum-Reserve has been a candidate for the list of World Heritage UNESCO
