= Egikal =

Rural locality in Ingushetia

Egikal Эгикал
- Aul

Other transcription(s)
  - Ingush: Аьгикхаьлла
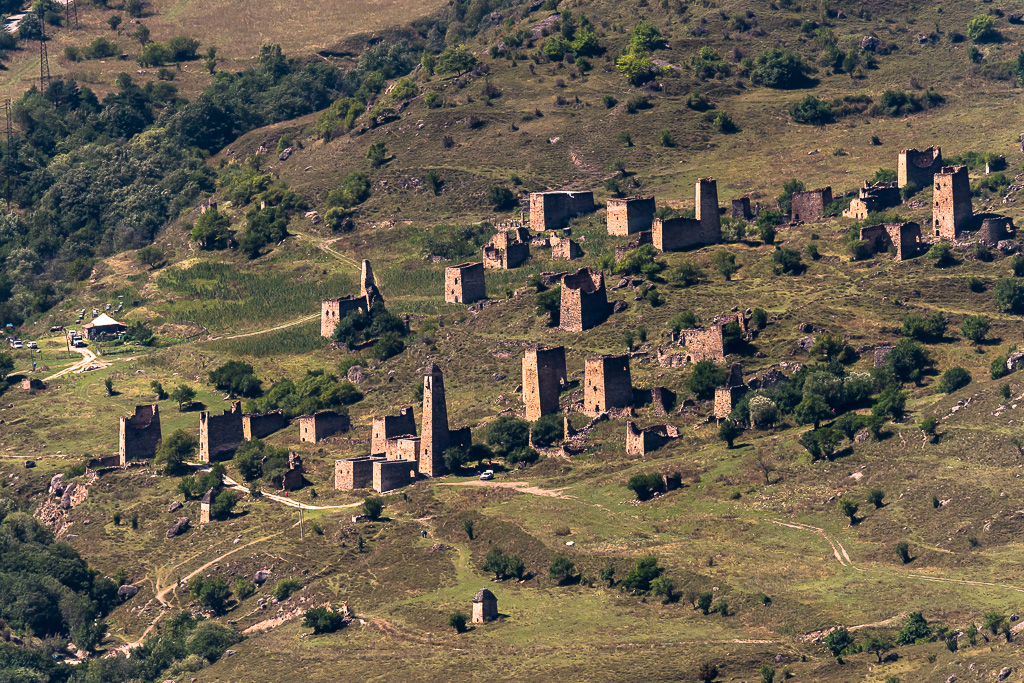
- Interactive map of Egikal
- Location of Egikal Egikal (Republic of Ingushetia)
- Coordinates: 42°50′01″N 44°55′05″E
- Country: Russia
- Federal subject: Ingushetia

Population (2010 Census)
  - Total: 5
  - Estimate (2024): 5 (0%)

Administrative status
  - Subordinated to: Dzheyrakhsky District
- Time zone: UTC+3 (MSK)
- Postal code: 386430
- OKTMO ID: 26620450146

Egikal (Russian: Эгикал; Ingush: Аьги-Кхаьлла, romanized: Ägi-Qälla, lit. 'Settlement of Ägi') is a city-settlement (aul) in the Dzheyrakhsky District of Ingushetia. It is part of the rural settlement (administrative center) of Guli. Within its territory are numerous cultural monuments of ancient and medieval Ingush architecture: cyclopean tower-type dwellings, five combat towers (Ingush: вӀов, vhóv), six semi-combat towers, and fifty residential towers (Ingush: гӀала, ghāla). There are also a large number of diverse burial sites, including 106 crypt burial grounds, one mausoleum, and three sanctuaries. These structures, along with the entire territory of the settlement, are currently part of the Dzheyrakh-Assa State Historical, Architectural and Natural Museum-Reserve and are under state protection.

== Geography ==
Egikal is located 85 km south of the capital, Magas, and 25 km east of the district centre, Dzheyrakh. The nearest settlements are: Barkhane and Tori to the north, Targim to the east, Khamkhi to the southeast, and Leymi and Ozig to the west.

== History ==
Within the settlement is a site associated with the Kura–Araxes culture, known as the “Egikal burial ground”. It is located to the west of the settlement, toward the Targim Basin, on the southern slopes of a rocky range, and dates to the end of the 3rd millennium BC. The burial ground was discovered and studied by B. M. Khashagulgov in 1988. Also located in Egikal are the remains of more than 15 megalithic cyclopean dwellings dating from the second half of the 2nd millennium BC to the 15th century AD.

== Demographics ==
According to the censuses conducted in 1874, 1883, 1890, 1914, and 1926, the population of Egikal consisted entirely of ethnic Ingush people.

== Bibliography ==
- Чахкиев, Д. Ю. (2003). Алироев, И. А. (ed.). Древности горной Ингушетии [Antiquities of Mountainous Ingushetia] (in Russian). Vol. 1. Назрань.
- Зейдлиц, Н. (1878). Терская область. Списокъ населенныхъ мѣстъ по свѣдѣніямъ 1874 года [Terek region. List of populated places according to 1874]. Списки населенныхъ мѣстъ Кавказскаго края (in Russian) (1st ed.). Тифлисъ: Типографія Главнаго управленіи намѣстника Кавказскаго. pp. 1–81.
- Терскій Областной Статистическій Комитет (1885). Благовѣщенскій, Н. А. (ed.). Списокъ населенныхъ мѣстъ Терской области: По свѣдѣніям къ 1-му января 1883 года [List of populated areas of the Terek region: According to information on January 1st of 1883] (in Russian). Владикавказъ: Типографія Терскаго Областнаго Правленія. pp. 1–78.
- Терскій Областной Статистическій Комитет (1890). Максимов, Е. (ed.). Сунженскій отдѣл [Sunzhensky Otdel]. Статистическиія таблицы населенныхъ мѣстъ Терской области (in Russian). Vol. 1. Issue 1. Владикавказъ: Типографія Терскаго Областнаго Правленія. pp. 1–85.
- Терскій Областной Статистическій Комитет (1915). Гортинскій, С. П. (ed.). Списокъ населенныхъ мѣстъ Терской области: (По даннымъ къ 1-му іюля 1914 года) [List of populated places in the Terek region: (as of July 1, 1914)] (in Russian). Владикавказъ: Электропечатня Типографія Терскаго Областнаго Правленія. pp. 2, 15–459.
- Северо-Кавказское кравое статистическое управление (1929). Поселенные итоги переписи 1926 года по Северо-Кавказскому краю [Settled results of the 1926 census in the North Caucasus region] (in Russian). Ростов-на-Дону: Отдел переписи. pp. 1–544.
- Хашегульгов Б.М., Ростунов В.Л. (1991). "Датировка куро-араксских погребений Эгикальского могильника". Тезисы докладов на конференции Археология на новостройках Северного Кавказа (in Russian). Грозный.
- Агиров, Т.А. (2021). Горная Ингушетия (in Russian). Москва: Перо.
