= Beyni =

Beyni Бейни
- Rural locality

Other transcription(s)
- Interactive map of Beyni
- Location of Beyni Beyni (Republic of Ingushetia)
- Coordinates: 42.834193°N 44.717048°E
- Country: Russia
- Federal subject: Ingushetia

Population (2010 Census)
  - Total: 70
  - Estimate (2024): 214 (+205.7%)

Administrative status
  - Capital of: Dzheyrakhsky District
- Time zone: UTC+3 (MSK)
- Postal code: 386430
- Dialing code: +7 8734
- OKTMO ID: 26620440101

Beyni (Russian: Бейни; Ingush: Бейни, Bejni) is a village and administrative center of Beyni rural settlement in Dzheyrakhsky District of the Republic of Ingushetia, Russia.

== Geography ==
Beyni is situated northeast from the administrative center of the district - Dzheyrakh village. The closest inhabited localities are Lyazhgi, Olgetti and Guli southeastward, and Armkhi southwestward.

== History ==
Beyni was established not later than the 16th century. The village was abandoned after the forced deportation of the entire Ingush population in 1944 and resettled when the deportees were allowed to return in 1957. Beyni has a touristic tent map, and is a starting point for a popular hike trail, and shortest way to Stolovaya Mountain (Ingush: Маьт-Лоам).

== Infrastructure ==
- Beyni municipal elementary school
