= Koki (aul) =

Rural locality in Ingushetia

Koki Коки
- Aul
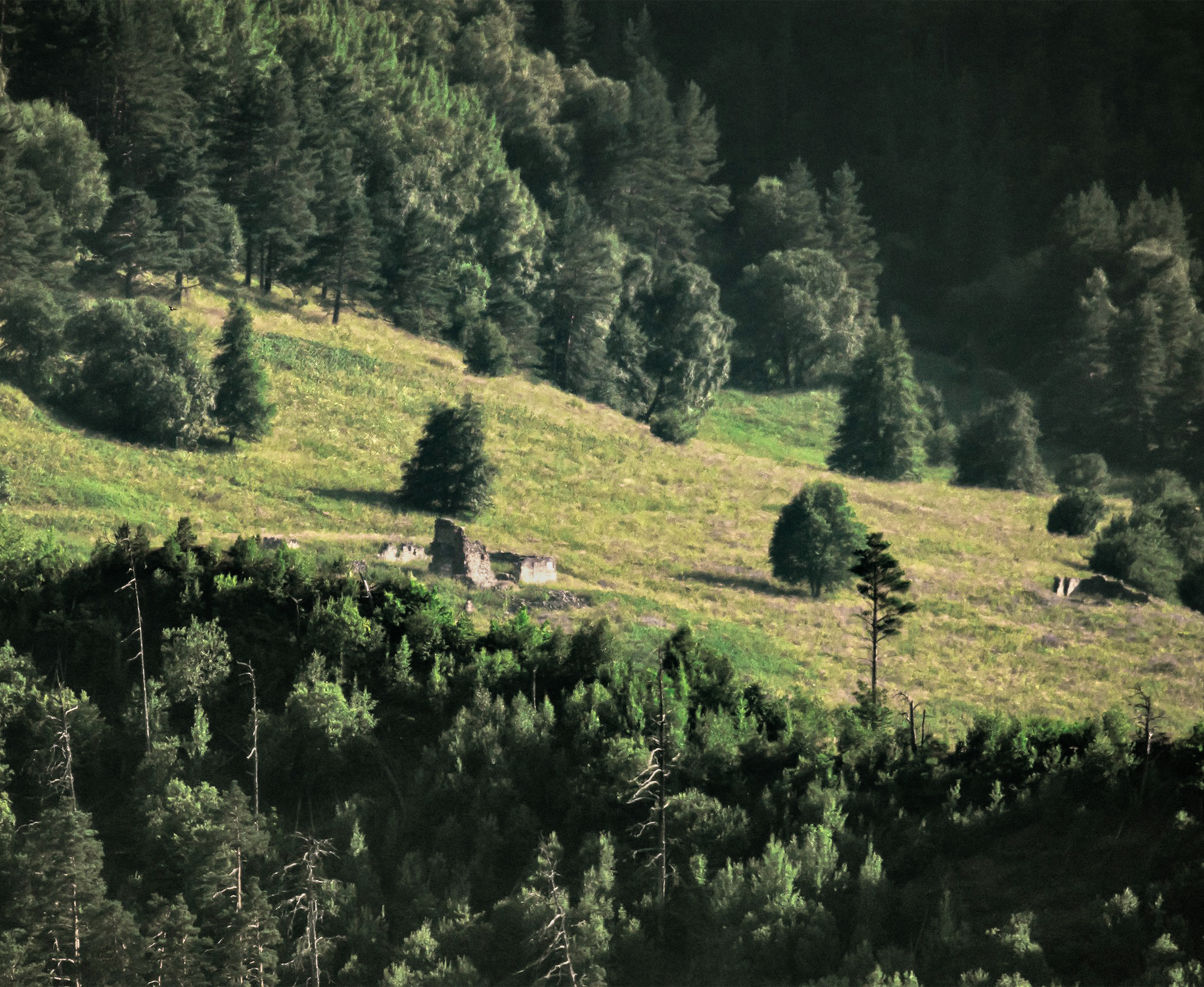
- Interactive map of Koki
- Location of Koki Koki (Republic of Ingushetia)
- Coordinates: 42°47′19.68″N 44°58′38.67″E
- Country: Russia
- Federal subject: Ingushetia

Population (2010 Census)
  - Total: 0
  - Estimate (2010): 0 )

Administrative status
  - Subordinated to: Dzheyrakhsky District
- Time zone: UTC+3 (MSK)
- OKTMO ID: 26620450291

Koki (Note: Also referred to as 'Kokki', 'Kekki', or 'Kek'; according to one theory, may derive from the kinship with the ancient city-settlements of the 3 brothers — Qäqalĕ (Ingush: Кхаькхале)) (Ingush: Коки) is a medieval village (aul) in the Dzheyrakhsky District of Ingushetia. It is part of the rural settlement (administrative center) of Guli. Koki is the ancestral village of Ingush clan (teip) Kokurkhoy (Ingush: Кокурхой). (Note: Also spelled 'Kokkurkhoy', 'Kukurkhoy' (russianized: Kokurkhoev, Kukurkhoev))

== Geography ==
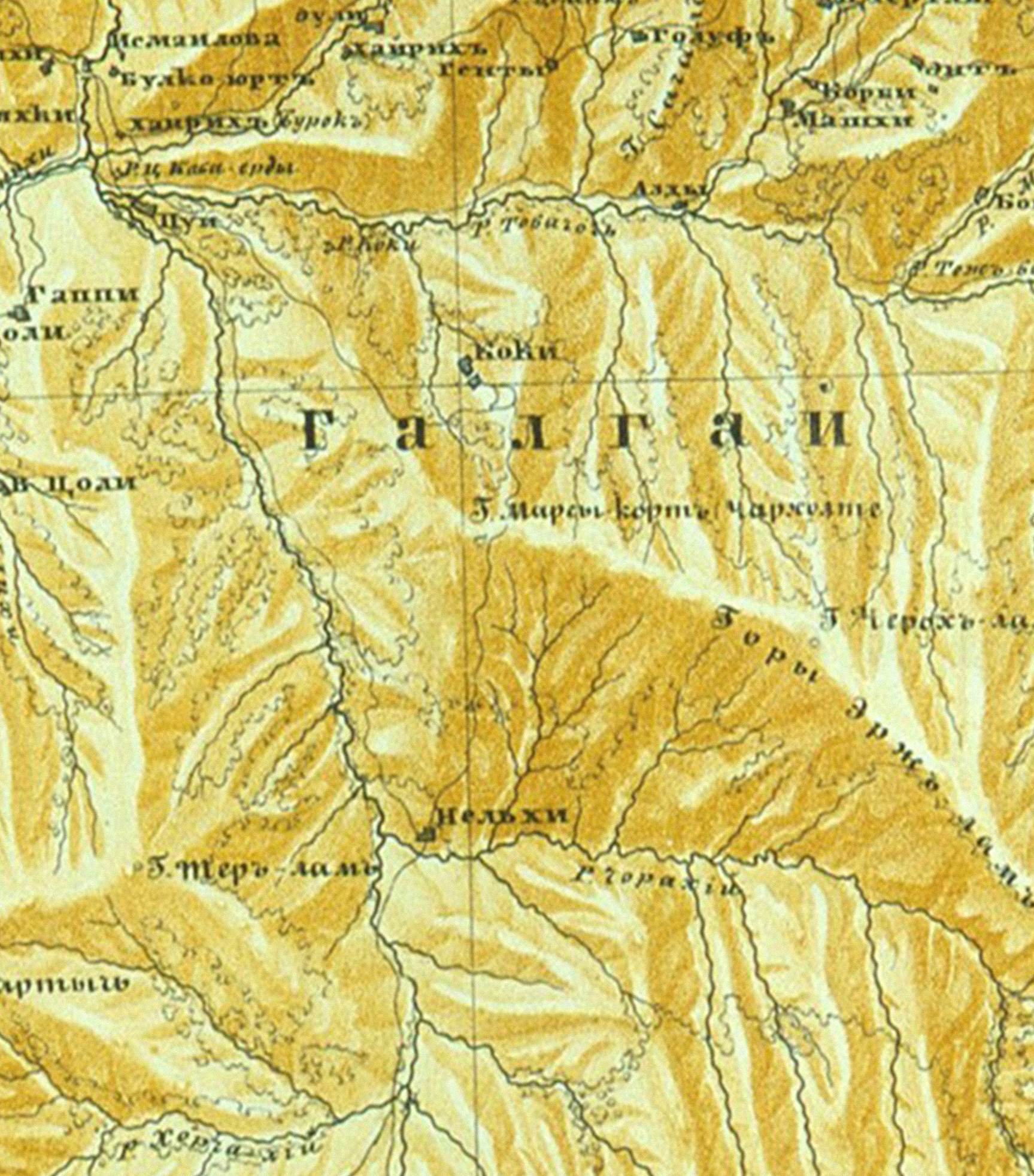
Koki (Коки) on a mid 19th century topographic map, located on the bank of the Assa and Guloykhi rivers.

The village is located on a forest clearing 1580 m above sea level on the slope of Mount Cherekhkort, on the left bank of the Guloykhi River, not far from the border with Georgia. The nearest settlements are: in the northeast — Vovnushki, in the south — Nelkh, in the northwest — Puy, in the valley of the Assa River.

== History ==
The tower complex of Koki is estimated to be built no later than the 16th century. It now consists of the ruins of a battle tower and six residential tower buildings, which in the past were united by means of a stone defensive wall into a single fortified complex. On the neighboring slope, across a mountain stream, there are ruins of more structures, usually called "Upper Koki", which are easily visible from the Guloy-khi gorge. Within the village there are 3 dilapidated above-ground collective crypt tombs of the late Middle Ages, situated on a mountain slope. The local men were considered excellent warriors and hunters in the past, as well as experienced cattle breeders and beekeepers, and the women were considered master dressmakers who knew the intricacies of gold and silver embroidery.

According to the family tree of the Kokurkhoy clan (teip), they were known as the clan of Fèrta Shoulí, who for centuries were among the defenders of the "Ghalghai outposts", historically also called the "Durdzuk Gates" in the valley of the Assa River. A portion of the Kokurkhoy established themselves in the neighboring mountain village Nilkh, whereas a few others resided in Ghul. On the plain, the Kokurkhoy are regarded as the founders of Sredniye Achaluki. According to records from 1886, sixteen families of this clan lived in Nasyr-Kort. Some also settled in Dattykh.

In the autumn of 1910, the towers of the village of Koki were blown up by tsarist troops, for harboring abrek Zelimkhan. The inhabitants of Koki (Kek) and the neighboring village of Nelkh (Nilkh), including 360 members of the Kokurkhoev family — among them children, women, and the elderly — were imprisoned in Vladikavkaz for three months before being exiled to the Yeniseysk Governorate in Siberia. In 1913, the repressed were rehabilitated and allowed to return to their homeland, but it was not possible to restore the towers.

== Hydronym ==
Near the village Keï of the Tsorin society exists a mountain pack trail located by a small river called Kukurkhoy-khi.

== Bibliography ==
- Agieva, Lemka (2015). Ингушское гостеприимство [Ingush hospitality] (in Russian). Magas: «Пилигрим». pp. 1–187. ISBN 978-5-98993-239-9.
- Albogachieva, Makka (1998). Многоликая Ингушетия [The many faces of Ingushetia] (in Russian). Saint Petersburg: «АЙЮ». pp. 1–310.
- Chakhkiev, Djabrail (2003). Древности Горной Ингушетии [Antiquities of Mountainous Ingushetia] (in Russian). Vol. 2. Nalchik: El-Fa. pp. 161–283.
- Dakhkilgov, Shukri (1991). A. Zyazikov (ed.). Происхождение ингушских фамилий [Origin of Ingush surnames]. Grozny: «Книга». p. 64. ISBN 5-7666-0423-8.
- Dudarov, Abdul-Mazhit (2017). "Горцы и духовенство Северного Кавказа при смене двух империй — царской и большевистской" [Highlanders and clergy of the North Caucasus with the change of two empires - Tsarist and Bolshevik]. Vestnik INIIGN Im. Ch. E. Akhrieva (in Russian) (2). Magas: INIIGN im. Ch. E. Akhrieva: 10–16.
- Kilimatov, Alikhan (2018). Кокурхой: история факты документы [Kokurkhoy: history facts documents] (in Russian). Nalchik: «Тетраграф». pp. 1–411. ISBN 978-5-00066-126-0.
- Suleymanov, Аhmad (1978). Shaykhiev, A. (ed.). Топонимия Чечено-Ингушетии [Toponymy of Checheno-Ingushetia] (in Russian). Vol. 2: Горная Ингушетия (юго-запад) и Чечня (центр и юго-восток). Грозный: Чечено-Ингушское Книжное Издательство. pp. 1–233.
- Yakovlev, Nikolai (1925). Ингуши [The Ingush] (in Russian). Moscow: Типография Госиздата „Красный Пролетарий“. pp. 3–134.
