= Vovnushki =

Rural locality in Ingushetia

Vovnushki Вовнушки
- Aul

Other transcription(s)
  - Ingush: Вӏовнашке
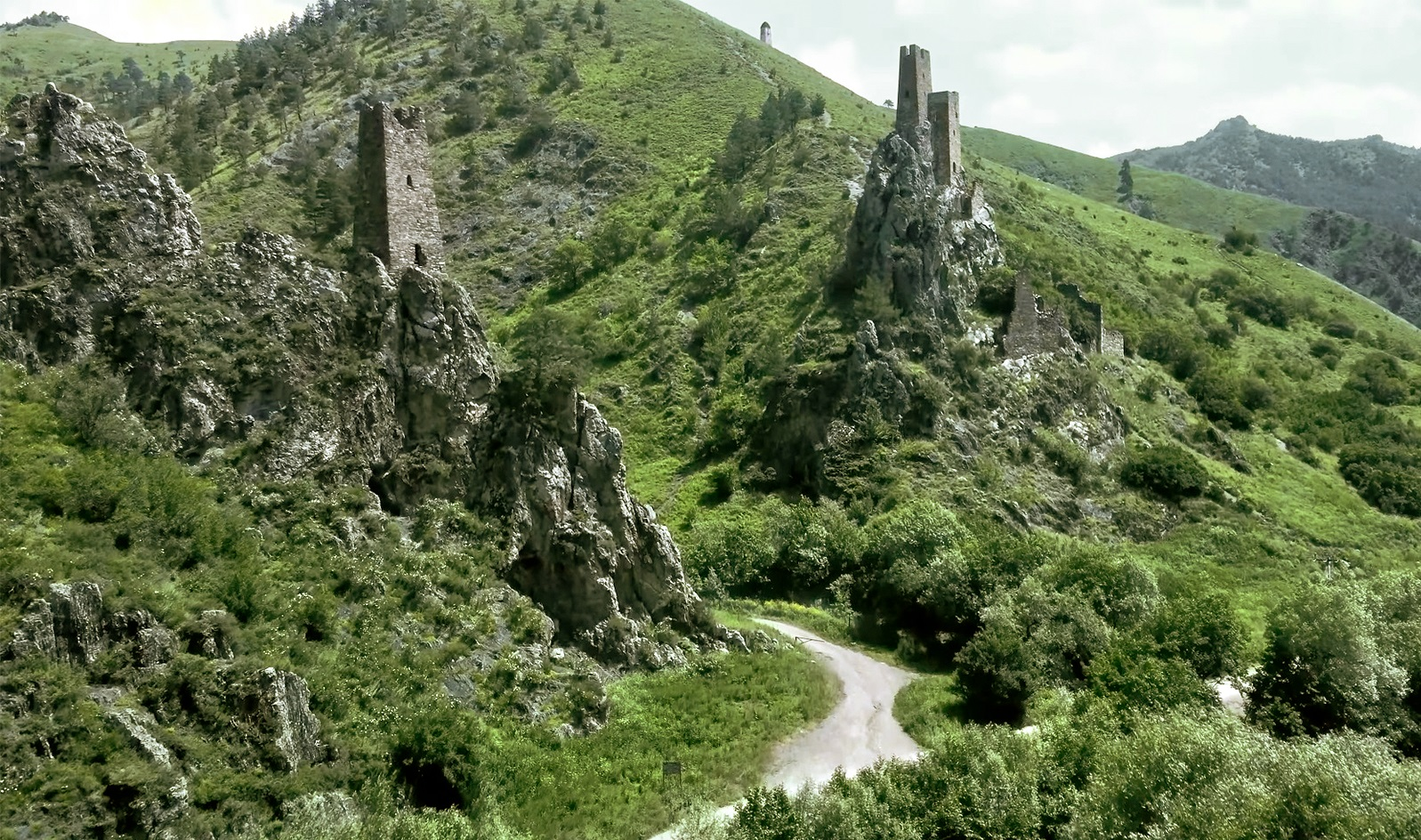
- Interactive map of Vovnushki
- Location of Vovnushki Vovnushki (Republic of Ingushetia)
- Coordinates: 42°48′02″N 44°59′43″E
- Country: Russia
- Federal subject: Ingushetia

Population
  - Estimate (2010): 0 )

Administrative status
  - Subordinated to: Dzheyrakhsky District

Vovnushki (Ingush: Вӏо́внашке, romanized: Vhóvnashke) is a medieval complex with defensive Ingush watchtowers. It is a unique monument of Ingush architecture, which is part of the Dzheyrakh-Assa State Historical-Architectural and Natural Museum-Reserve and is under state protection. According to scholars, several routes of the Silk Road passed through the mountains of Ingushetia. One route supposedly ran along the river Guloykhi, along the tower cities of Gul, Tsori, Vovnushki, Pyaling, Niy, etc. The Vovnushki towers are traditionally regarded as the ancestral towers of the Ingush taïp Ozdoy (Ingush: Оздой).

In 2008, the Vovnushki tower complex became a finalist in the Seven Wonders of Russia competition. In 2010, the Central Bank of Russia issued a commemorative silver coin dedicated to Vovnushki.

== Etymology ==
The Ingush name Vhovnashke consists of the plural form of the word "vhov", meaning "guard/military tower", and the suffix — "ke" (ka), referring to a place. Thus, it translates as "the place of guard towers".

== Geography ==
Vovnushki is one of the most exotic tower complexes among the defensive structures of ancient Ingushetia. The monument consists of three main towers, two of which stand on top of one rock and one on the opposite rock. The towers of the complex attract attention from afar, although they are located in the picturesque gorge of the Guloykhi River against the backdrop of impressive rocks and ridges of the Caucasus. The towers are built of stone and look like a natural extension of the rocks on top of which they are built. They are four-story buildings of a truncated pyramidal shape with flat roofs and narrow loophole windows. The barrier walls that block access to the towers are organically inscribed in the natural relief of impregnable rocks. The nearest settlements are: in the north — Ozdiye, in the southwest — Koki, in the northeast — Myashkhi, in the west — Puy.

== Gallery ==
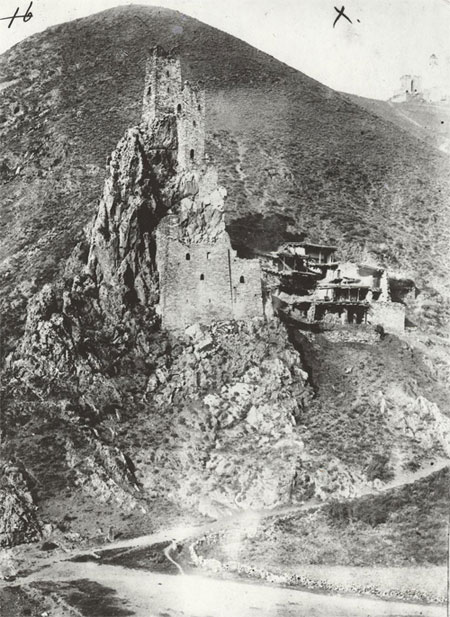
A picture of the eastern towers in 1910.

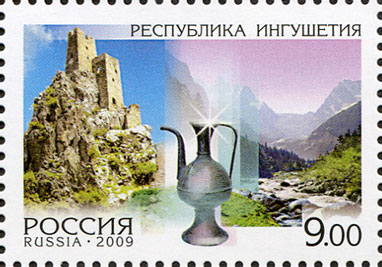
Vovnushki on a stamp of the Russian Post: "Republic of Ingushetia" in 2009, Series: «Regions».

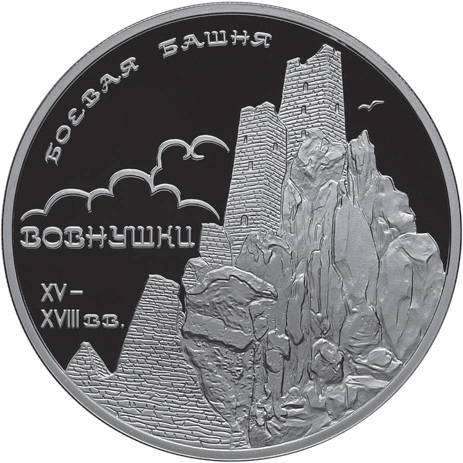
Vovnushki on a commemorative coin of the Bank of Russia in 2010. Series: «Architectural Monuments».
