= Kistin Gorge =

Gorge of the Armkhi River in the Dzheyrakhsky District of Ingushetia

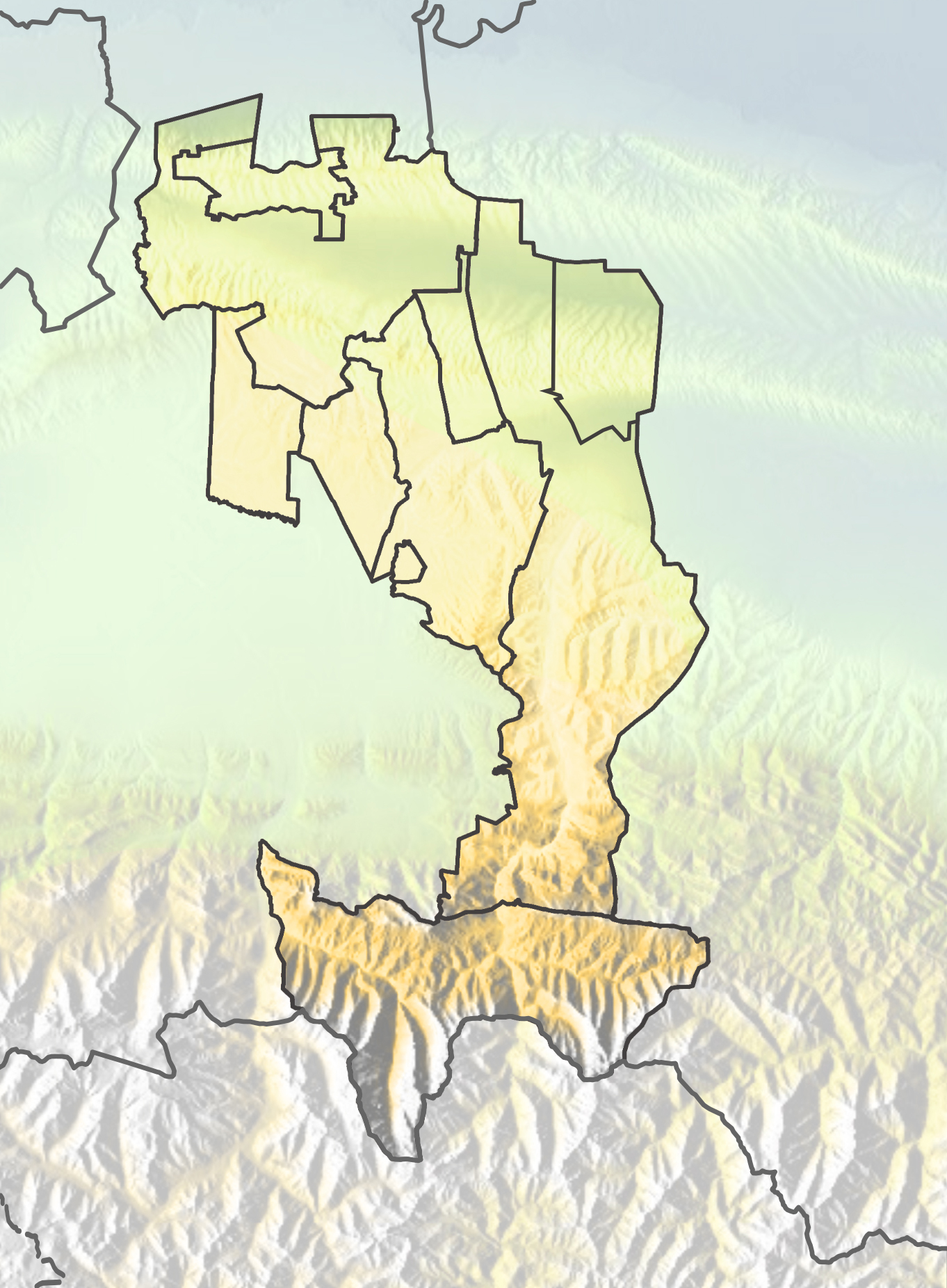
- Location within Russia Location within Republic of Ingushetia

Naming
- Native name: Ingush: Кистий чӀож

Geography
- Country: Russia
- Coordinates: 42°47′54″N 44°45′40″E
- River: Armkhi
- Interactive map of Kistin Gorge

Kistin Gorge (Ingush: Кистий чӀож, romanized: Kistiy ch'ozh) or Armkhi Gorge (Ingush: Ӏарамхий чӀож, romanized: 'Aramkhiy ch'ozh) is a gorge of the Armkhi River in the Dzheyrakhsky District of the Republic of Ingushetia. The name of the gorge comes from the historical name of the river Armkhi – Kistinka, which in turn comes from one of the ethnonyms of the Ingush – Kists. Historically, the area where the gorge is located was called "Kistetia". It is mentioned in medieval Georgian sources, in particular, in the work of Prince Vakhushti of Kartli.

== History ==
According to the legends, this road was controlled by the Tsurovs and the Yandievs. They "kept guard there and took tribute for the passage".

In Russian documents, the name was first mentioned in the first half of the 19th century, in military reports from the period of the Caucasian War, for example, in the Report of the Commander-in-Chief of the Separate Caucasian Corps, Field Marshal Paskevich-Erivansky, to the head of the main headquarters E.I.V. Adjutant General Chernyshev on the results of a military expedition to Mountainous Ingushetia under the command of Major General Abkhazov dated August 31, 1830.

== Bibliography ==
- Джанашвили, М. Г. (1897). Известия грузинских летописей и историков о Северном Кавказе и России [Bulletin of Georgian chronicles and historians about the North Caucasus and Russia] (in Russian). Тифлис: Типография К.П. Козловского. Головинский пр.. № 12. pp. 1–209.
- Сампиев, И. М. (2019). "Гидронимы Кистетии (Кистинского общества Ингушетии)" [Hydronyms of Kistetia (Kist society of Ingushetia)]. Сборник научных статей института социальных исследований [Collection of scientific articles of the Institute of Social Research] (in Russian). pp. 176–185.
- Штелин, Я. Я. (1771). Географическій мѣсяцословъ на 1772 годъ [Geographical menology for 1772] (in Russian). Санктпетербургъ: Императорская Академія наукъ. pp. 1–96.
- Klaproth, Heinrich Julius (1814). Geographisch-historische Beschreibung des östlichen Kaukasus, zwischen den Flüssen Terek, Aragwi, Kur und dem Kaspischen Meere (Pt.2 of Volume 50) [Geographical-historical description of the Eastern Caucasus, between the rivers Terek, Aragvi, Kur and the Caspian Sea] (in German). Weimar: Verlag des Landes-Industrie-Comptoirs. pp. 1–218.
- Rommel, Christoph (1808). Die Völker des Caucasus nach den Berichten der Reisebeschreiber [The peoples of the Caucasus according to the travelogues' reports] (in German). Weimar: Verlage des Landes-Industrie-Comptoirs. pp. 1–102.
- Finley, A. (1827). Universal Geography: Or A Description of All Parts of the World, on a New Plan, According to the Great Natural Divisions of the Globe. Vol. 1. Philadelphia: Conrad Malte-Brun. pp. 1–503.
- Багратиони, Вахушти (1904). География Грузии [Geography of Georgia] (in Russian). Translated by Джананашвили, М. Г. Тифлис: Типография К.П. Козловского. Головинск. просп., № 12. pp. 1–290.
- Робакидзе, А. И., ed. (1968). Кавказский этнографический сборник. Очерки этнографии Горной Ингушетии [Caucasian ethnographic collection. Essays on the ethnography of Mountainous Ingushetia] (in Russian). Vol. 2. Тбилиси: Мецниереба. pp. 1–333.
- Дахкильгов, И.А. (2010). Антология ингушского фольклора. Ингушские предания [Anthology of Ingush folklore. Ingush legends] (in Russian). Vol. 7. Нальчик: Эль-Фа. pp. 1–363. ISBN 978-5-9996-0034-9.
- Картоев, М. М. (2020). Ингушетия в политике Российской империи на Кавказе. XIX век. Сборник документов и материалов [Ingushetia in the policy of the Russian Empire in the Caucasus. XIX century. Collection of documents and materials] (in Russian) (2 ed.). Ростов-на-Дону: Южный издательский дом. pp. 1–760. ISBN 978-5-98864-060-8.
