= Kists (ethnonym) =

One of the ethnonyms of the Ingush and Chechens

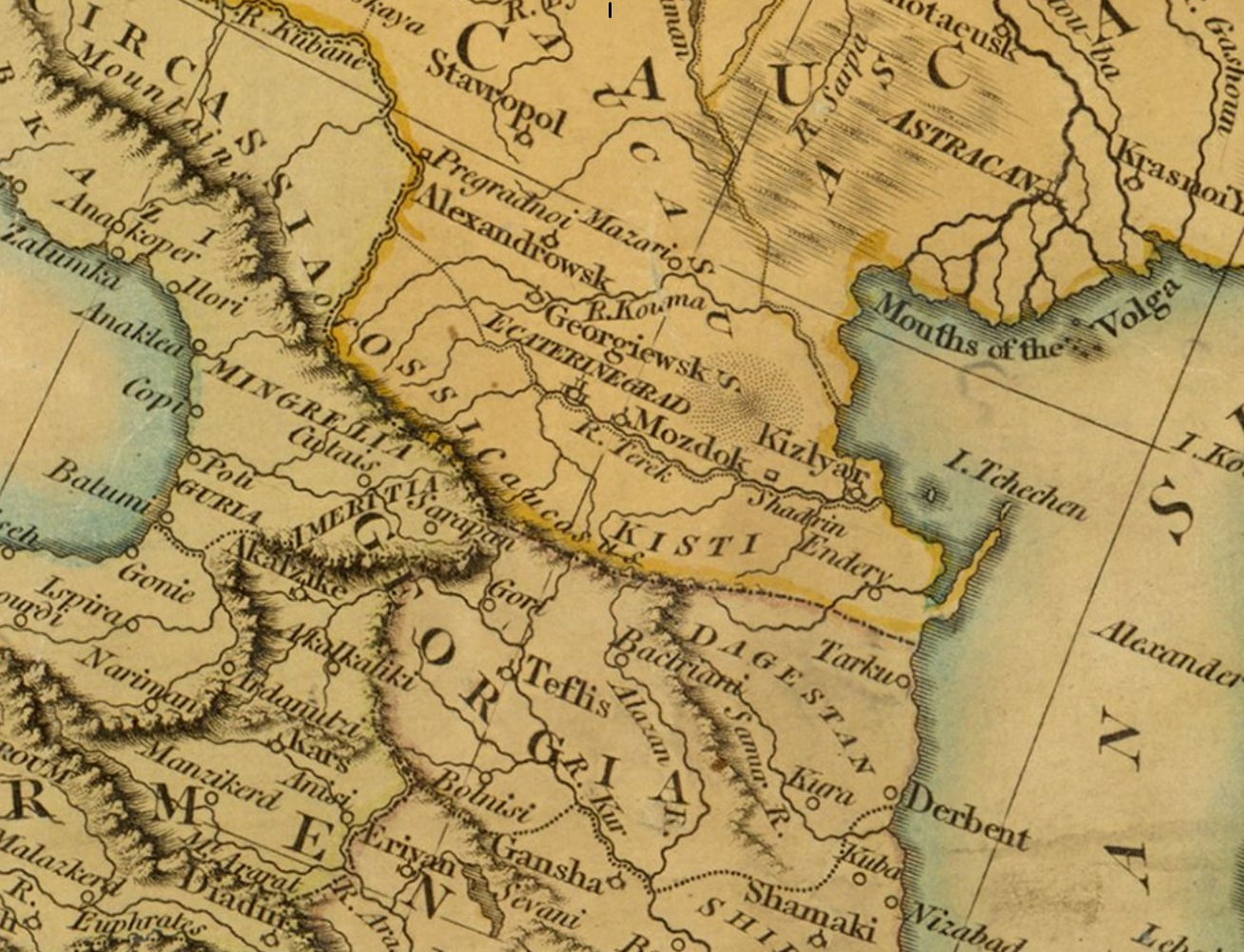
Kists in Northern Caucasus (1789)

Kists or Kistins (Note: Ingush: кистий, romanized: kistiy; Chechen: кистӀий, romanized: kisthiy; Georgian: ქისტები, romanized: kist'ebi) is an old exonym of all Nakh peoples (Ingush, Chechens and Batsbi), under which local societies later were designated, and conditionally divided into nearby Kistins and distant Kistins. In Russian sources of the 19th century, the term nearby Kistins referred to the inhabitants of the Kistin Gorge in the vicinity of river Armkhi in Ingushetia, and distant Kistins referred to the inhabitants of the upper reaches of the Argun in Chechnya. Today the name is mostly used to refer to the Chechens who compactly live in the Pankisi Gorge of Georgia.

== History ==
Ingushetia

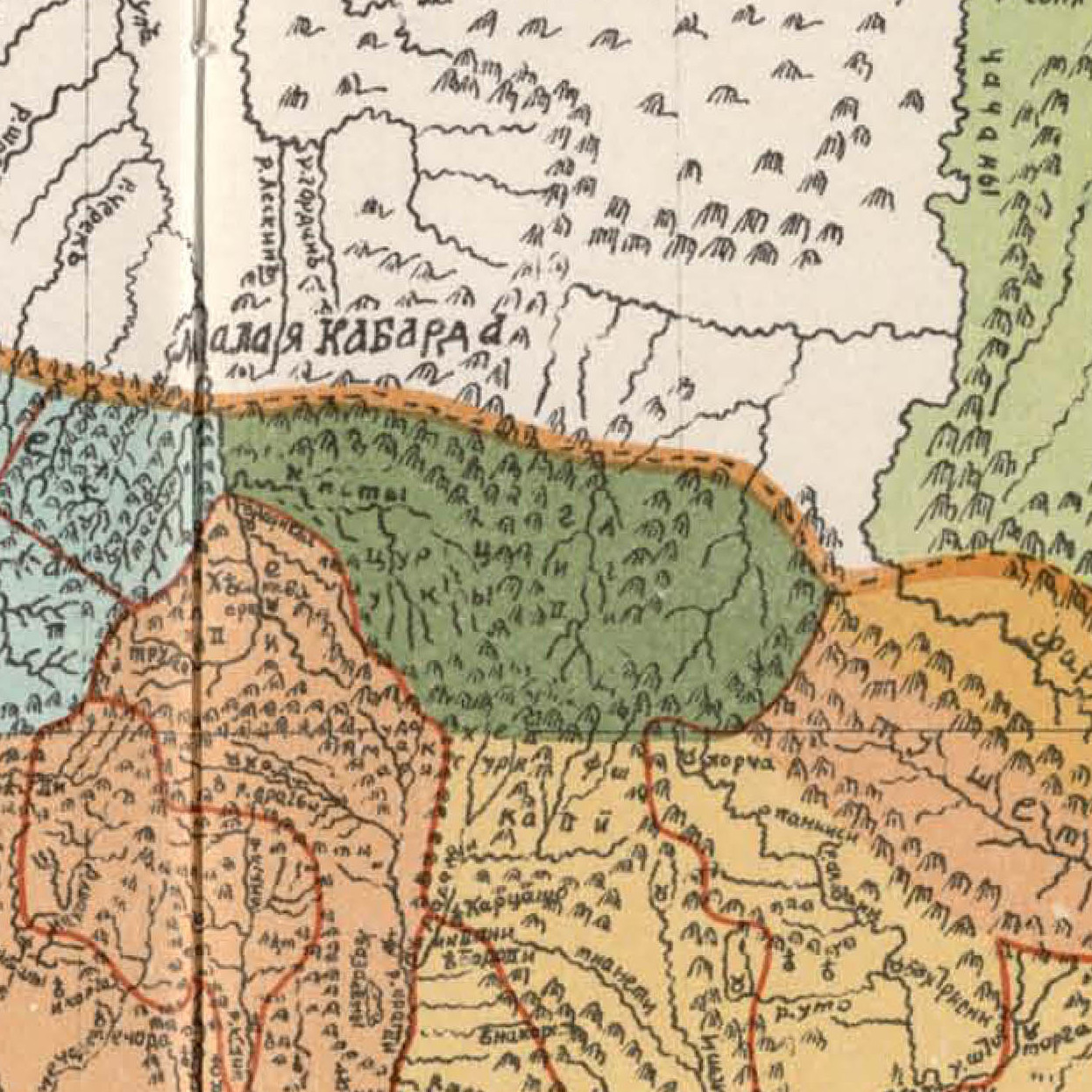
Kists (Кисты) on Vakhushti's map in 1745 located west of the Durdzuks (Цурцукы) and Gligvi (Глигвы)

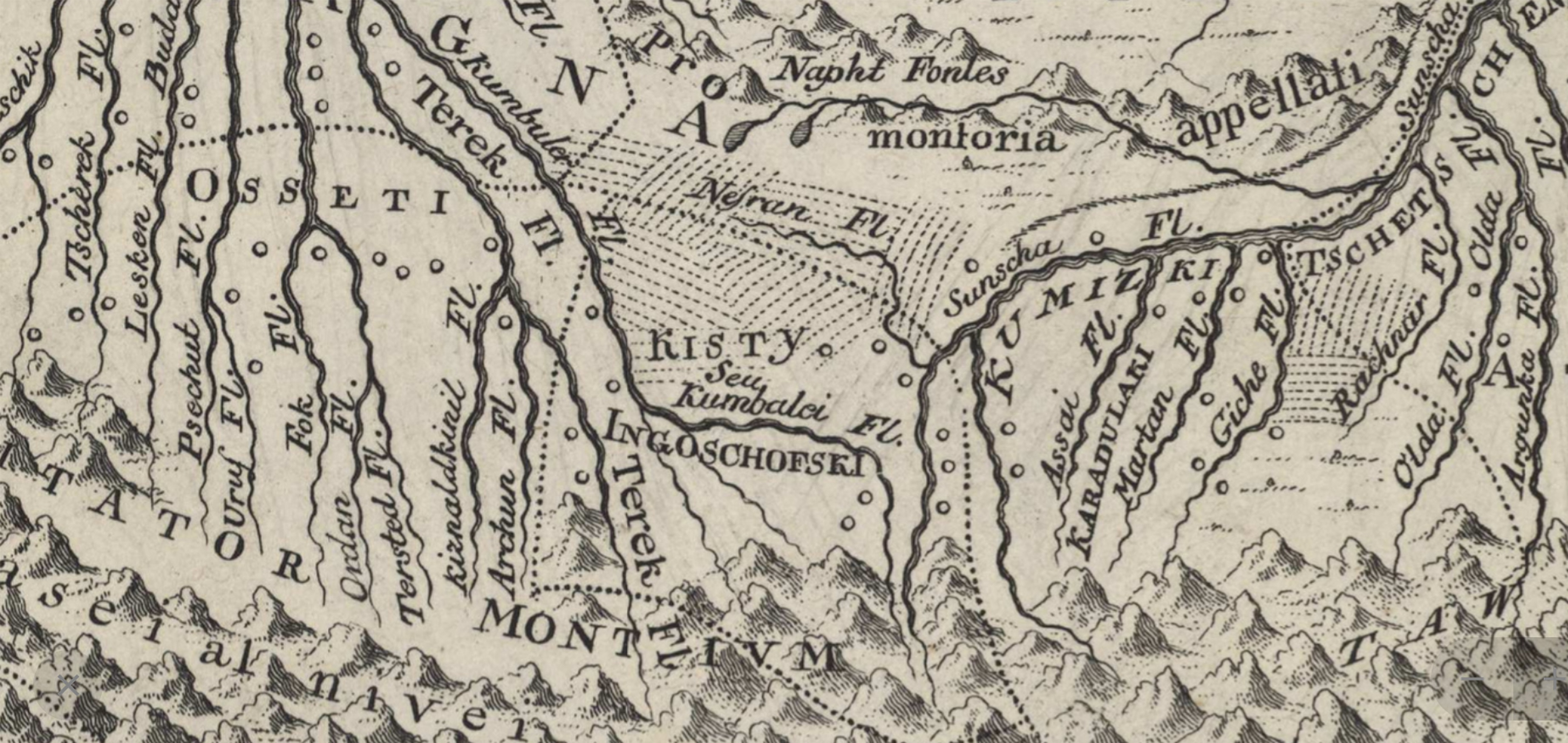
Kisty-Ingoschofski (Ingush) on Jacob von Staehlin's map in 1771, over a decade prior to the establishment of the fortress Vladikavkaz on the right bank of the Terek river.

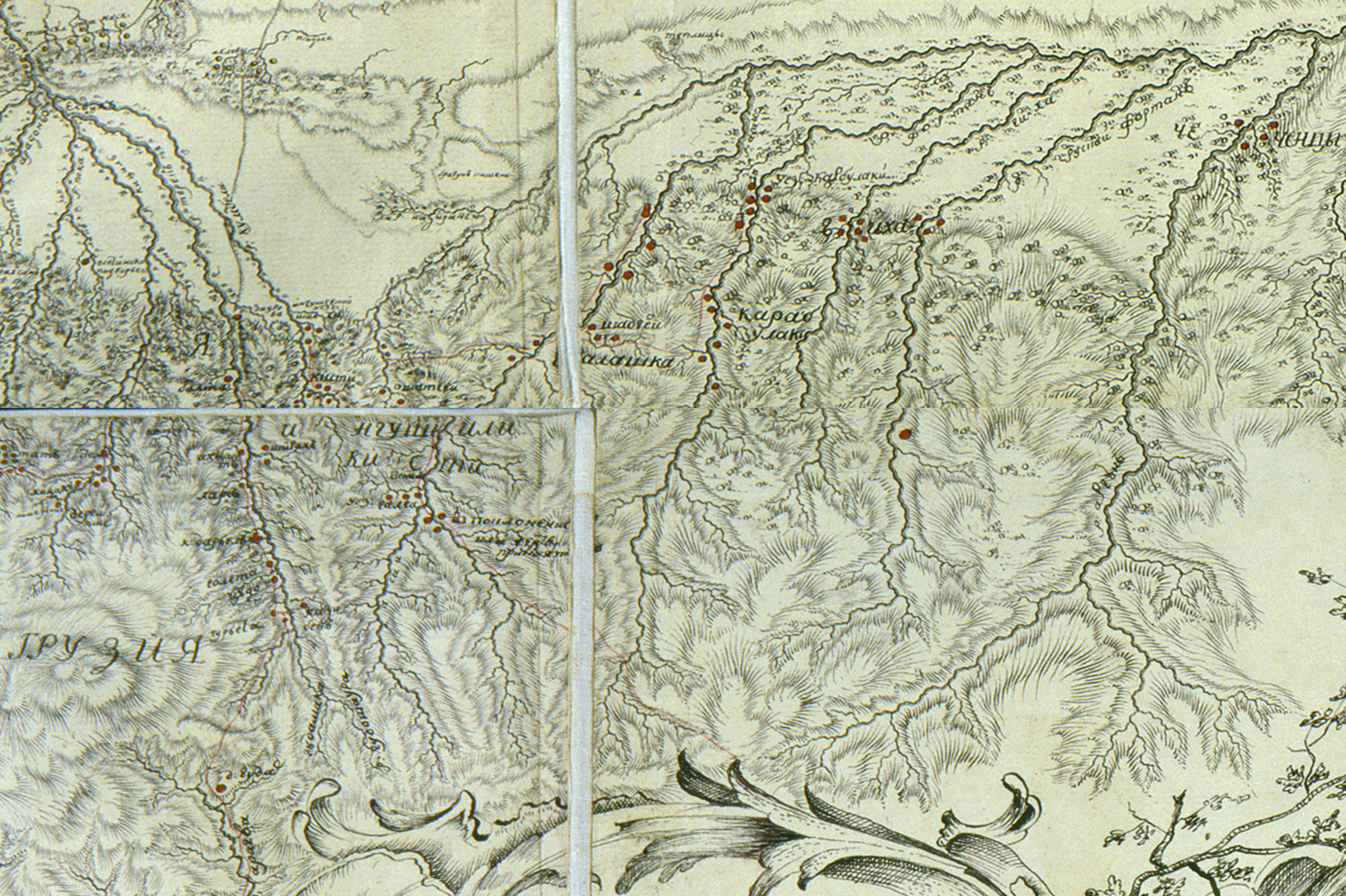
Ingush or Kists on L. Städer's map (1782)

Chechnya

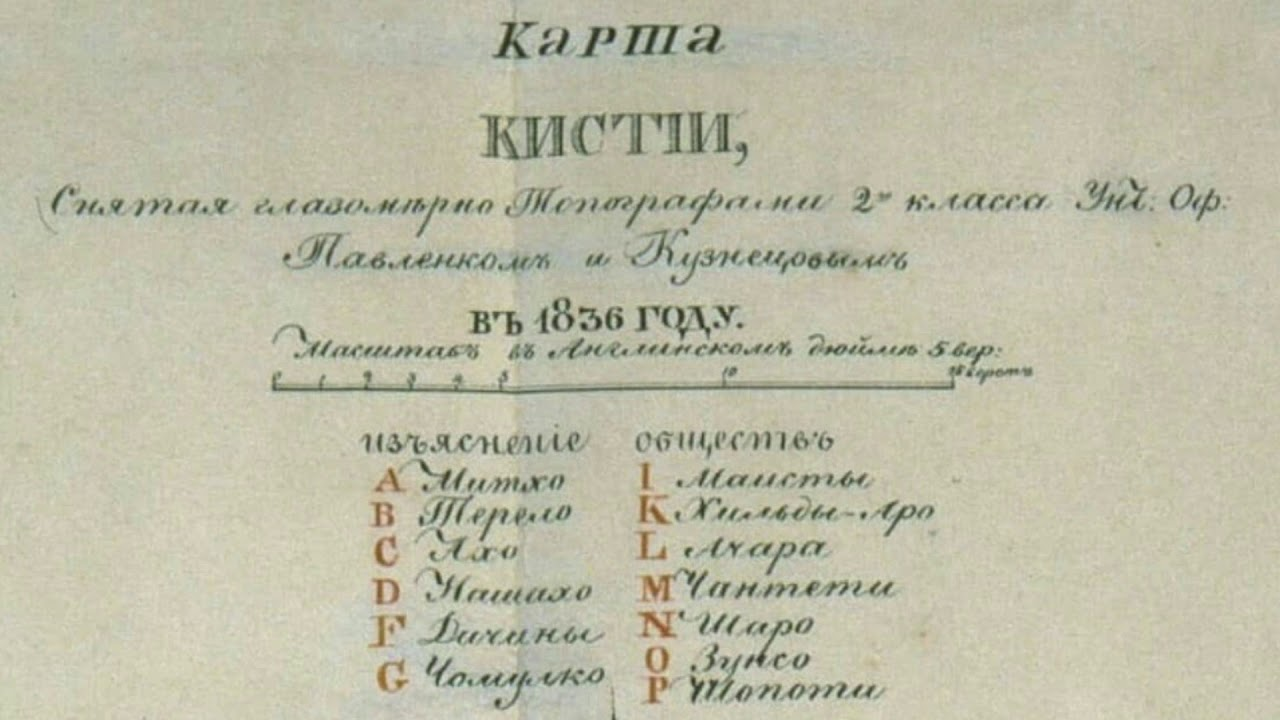
Map of the distant Kistins (1836)

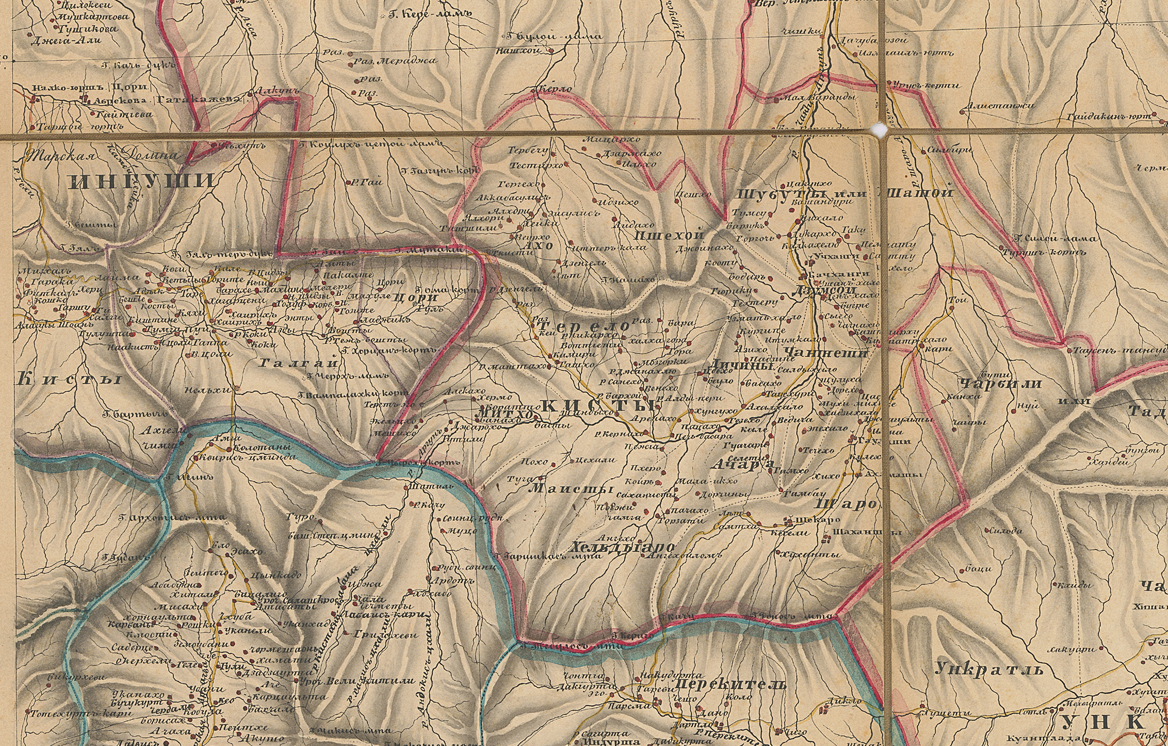
Kistins on the map of Little Chechnya (1847)

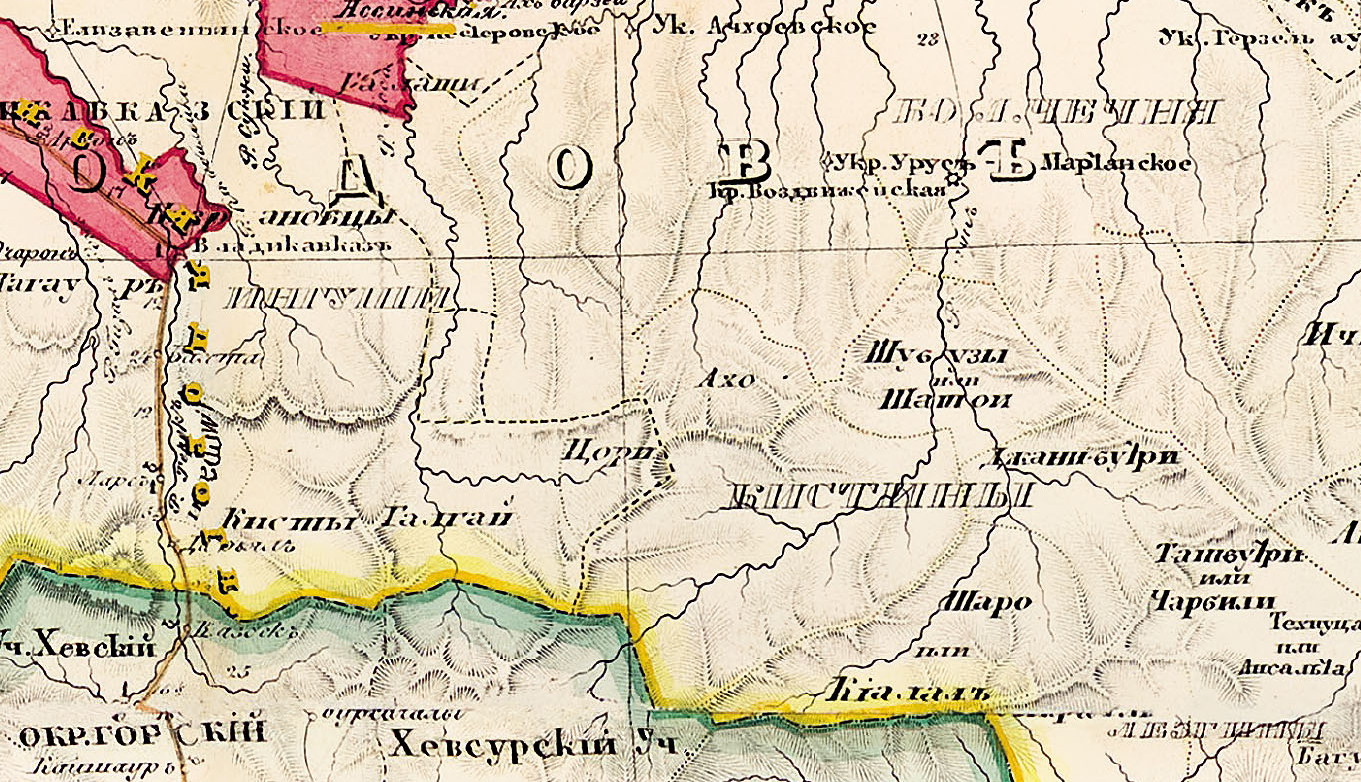
Kistins (1858)

One of the earliest mentions of the Kists (Kistk, Kusti) dates back to the 5th century in the Geography of Moses Khorenatsi. Ancient and medieval sources localize the Kists, in addition to the gorge of the Armkhi river, known in Georgian sources as "Kistetis-Tskali" and "Kistinka" in Russian sources, also in the gorge of the Oakhkarakhi river - tributaries of the Terek river flowing through the historical lands of the Kistin society of Ingushetia.

In Russian sources of the 18th century, the ethnonym Kists is often extended to all Nakh peoples. In Western European literature of the 18th century, the name "Kistins" is primarily given to the Ingush. In 19th century Russian sources, the terms "nearby Kistins" and "distant Kistins" are found, referring to the inhabitants of the Armkhi river gorge and to the inhabitants of the upper reaches of the Argun river.

=== XVIII-XIX ===
In the 1770's, J. Güldenstädt associates the term Kists with the Ingush people and the Chechens, dividing their lands into the following districts: Kachilik, Endre and Yakhsay; Achkingurt; Ardahl; Vapi; Angusht; Shalkha; Chechen; Atakhi; Kulga, or Dganti; Galgai; Dshanti; Chabrillo; Shabet County; Chishrikaker; Karabulak; Meesti; Meredzhi; Galashka; Duban.

In 1795, in the "Description the peoples inhabiting Russia", the Kists are mentioned as follows: Kistins, or Kisti, who are divided into different tracts of which it is known to exist: Chechens, Ingush and Karabulaks, they live along the Sunzha River, and in the middle mountains of the Caucasus.

The historian of the Caucasus S. Bronevsky described the borders of the Kist lands as follows:

The Kist lands stretch from the right, or eastern, bank of the Terek, which lies opposite the Ossetians, to the left bank of the Aksai, along the northern slope of the Caucasus, occupying from south to north part of the high slate mountains at the foot of the snowy ridge, part of the calcareous ridge, and finally, the advanced mountains even up to foothills to hilly valleys. They border to the northwest on Minor Kabarda, separated by the Sunzha, and on a small part of the Kizlyar district, separated by the Terek; to the west with Ossetia, to the south with a high snowy ridge; to the east with Lezgistan and with the Aksaev Kumyks.

Mainly based on data from J. Güldenstädt, S. Bronevsky reported that the Kists alternately called themselves "Kist", "Galga", and "Ingush", and used one name instead of the other,” indicating the prevalence of the term among the Ingush people.

== Fyappiy ==
The historical area where the Kists lived was called "Kisteti", as well as "Kistia" or "Kistinia". The Georgian prince, historian and geographer of the 18th century Prince Vakhushti of Kartli quite definitely localizes it along the gorge of the Armkhi river (the historical "Kistinka"), that is, in mountainous Ingushetia. Kists, in a narrow sense, as one of the Ingush societies, are noted in the "Review of the political state of the Caucasus in 1840", and in 1851 in the “Military Statistical Review of the Russian Empire, published by the highest command at the 1st branch of the Department of the General headquarters". The Kist society, as part of Ingushetia, was part of the Vladikavkaz district, the Ossetian military district and the Ingush district.

They bordered in the west with the Dzherakhins, in the east with the Galgaevs, in the south with Georgia, in the north the borders reached the Tarskoye Valley. The Kist society was also synonymously called "Fyappinsky", after the name of its constituent ethno-territorial group - the Fyappins (Ingush: Фаьппий), and later, in the second half of the 19th century, it became known as "Metskhalsky", after the name of the principal village Metskhal.

== Hydronym ==
- Kistinka — river in the Dzheyrakhsky District of Ingushetia
- Kistinka — river in the Kazbegi Municipality of the Mtskheta-Mtianeti region of Georgia

== Bibliography ==
- Charles Vallencey. Collectanea de Rebus Hibernicis (англ.). — Dublin: Graisberry and Campbell, 1804. — Vol. VI. — 480 p.
- Johann Gottfried Eichhorn. Geschichte der Litteratur, von ihrem Anfang bis auf die neuesten Zeiten (нем.). — Göttingen: Bey Vandenhoek und Ruprecht, 1807. — Bd. 6. — 678 S.
- Johann Christoph Adelung. Mithridates, oder allgemeine Sprachenkunde mit dem Vater Unser als Sprachprobe in beynahe fünfhundert Sprachen und Mundarten (нем.). — Berlin: In der Vossischen Buchandlung, 1806. — 686 S.
- Sir Richard Phillips. A Geographical View of the World: Embracing the Manners, Customs, and Pursuits, of Every Nation; Founded on the Best Authorities (англ.). — New York: E. Hopkins and W. Reed, 1826. — 406 p.
- Butkov P. G. Opinion about the book: Slavic antiquities // Three ancient treaties of the Russians with the Norwegians and the Swedes. — St. Petersburg: Printing house of the Ministry of Internal Affairs, 1837. — 398 p.
- Caucasian Territory // Military Statistical Review of the Russian Empire: published by the highest order at the 1st branch of the Department of the General Staff. — St. Petersburg: Printing house of the Department of the General Staff, 1851. — T. 16. Part 1. — 274 p.
- Chulkov M.D., Zakharov A., Kolpashnikov A.Ya., Sablin N.Ya. Historical description of Russian commerce at all ports and borders from ancient times to the present and all the predominant legalizations on this sovereign, Emperor Peter the Great and now safely reigning Empress Empress Catherine the Great / M. D. Chulkov. - M .: University printing house at N. Novikov, 1785. - T. II. — 674 p.
