= Kistinka (river) =

River in the Caucasus

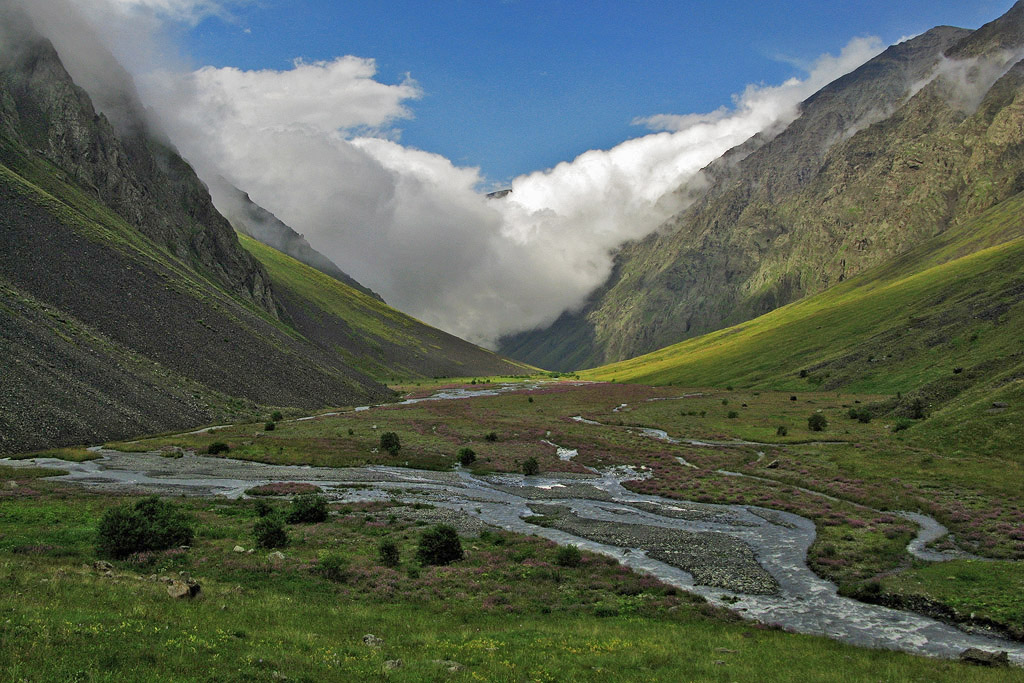

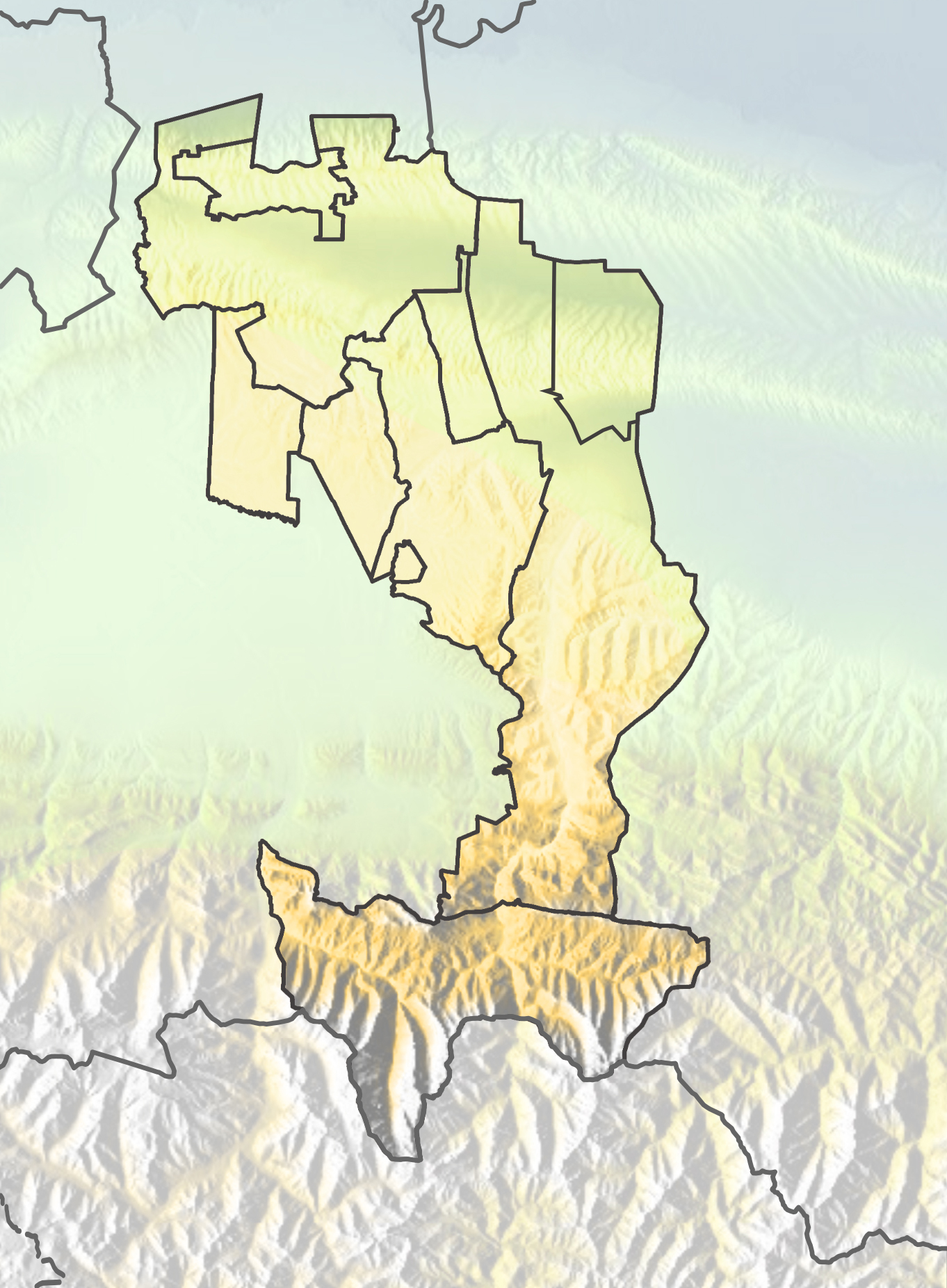
- Location within Caucasus Mountains Location within Mtskheta-Mtianeti Location within Republic of Ingushetia
- Native name: Oakhkara-khi, Kisti-khi (Ingush); Khde, Kist'ura (Georgian)

Location
- Countries: Georgia
- Region: Mtskheta-Mtianeti
- District: Kazbegi Municipality

Physical characteristics
- Source: Kibishi Glacier
  - coordinates: 42.6252°N 44.7494°E
  - elevation: +2,345 m (7,694 ft)
- Mouth: Terek
  - location: 566 km along the right bank of the Terek river
  - coordinates: 42.7382°N 44.629°E
  - elevation: −1,310 m (−4,300 ft)
- Length: 17 km (11 mi)
- Basin size: 79 km^{2} (31 mi^{2})

Kistinka (Georgian: ხდე, ქისტურა, Ingush: Оахкара-хий, Кисти-хий, romanized: Oakhkara-khi, Kisti-khi Russian: Кистинка) is a river in Georgia that flows in the Khevi region. It originates at the foot of the Kibishi Glacier and flows to the northwest into the river Terek near the Russian-Georgian border. The length of the river is 17 km, the basin area is 79 km².

== Nomenclature ==
The hydronym Kistinka derives from one of the old Ingush ethnonyms — Kisti and is used to refer to both rivers Arm-khi (Ingush: Ӏарам-хий, romanized: Aram-khi; Georgian: ქისტეთისწყალი, Kistetis-tskali) in the Dzheyrakhsky District and Oakhkara-khi (Georgian: ხდე, ქისტურა, romanized: khde, kist'ura) in the Kazbegi Municipality. In 1910, Foma Gorepekin composes a short guide titled: «In the mountains of the Terek region», where he mentions being escorted along the gorge of the river Kistinka by the Buzurtanov brothers — well-known local guides and alpinists from the neighbouring Ingush village Gveleti.

The name of this river could either come from the Ingush word "okhkaro" which translates as "rich", or from the root word "kora", meaning "window" or "pass", which could refer to the path that leads to Gudauri through the pass from the Oakhkara gorge, where it passes through the gorge of the river Kora — a tributary of the Kistinka.

== History ==
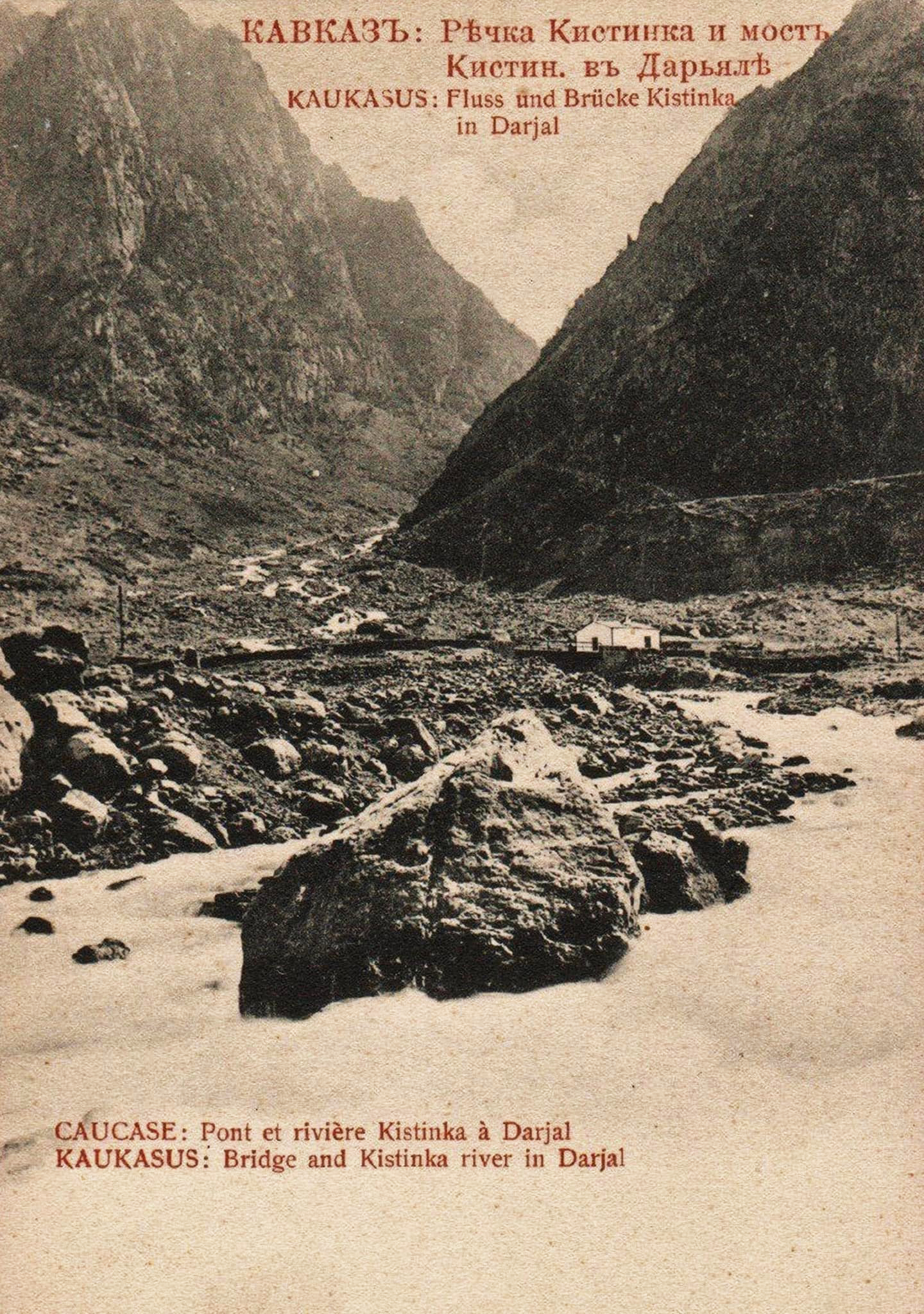
Early 20th century postal card depicting the Kistinka river and bridge.

In June 1637, F. Volkonsky and clerk A. Khvatov were sent from Moscow to Kakheti. The delegation faced difficulties due to the challenging relations between the Georgian King of Kakheti, Teimuraz I and the Duke of Aragvi, who controlled the Darial Gorge. As a result, the delegation turned to the Oakhkara gorge, where they were met by an Ingush prince named Khavsa, who escorted the delegation further to the Georgian border.

The Oakhkara gorge belonged to three Ingush families: the Yandievs, the Mamilovs, and the Aldaganovs - branches of a common ancestral family known as Chachaev. Their forefather and his relatives had resided along the entire stretch of the gorge. Due to constant conflicts with the Khevsurs, they eventually resettled to the Dzheyrakh and Kist societies. Despite this, they maintained their possession of the land and operated farms on it.

In the 1870s, Major-General Mikhail Kazbek issued an order prohibiting them the use of the land and declaring it state property.

== Bibliography ==
- Сулейманов, А. С (1978). Топонимия Чечено-Ингушетии. Часть 2. Горная Ингушетия (юго-запад) и Чечня (центр и юго-восток) (in Russian). Грозный: Чечено-Ингушское Книжное Издательство. pp. 1–233.
- Кушева, Е. Н. (1963). Народы Северного Кавказа и их связи с Россией (вторая половина XVI — 30-е годы XVII века) (in Russian). Москва: Академия наук СССР. pp. 1–370.
- Робакидзе, А. И. (1968). Кавказский этнографический сборник. Очерки этнографии Горной Ингушетии (in Russian). Тбилиси: Мецниереба. pp. 1–333.
- Багратиони, Вахушти (1904). География Грузии [Geography of Georgia] (in Russian). Translated by Джананашвили, М. Г. Тифлис: Типография К.П. Козловского. Головинск. просп., № 12. pp. 1–290.
- Волкова, Н.Г. (1974). Этнический состав населения Северного Кавказа в XVIII — начале XX века (in Russian). Москва: Наука. pp. 1–276.
