= Alby-Yerdy Temple =

Alby-Yerdy Альби-Ерды ალბი-ერდი
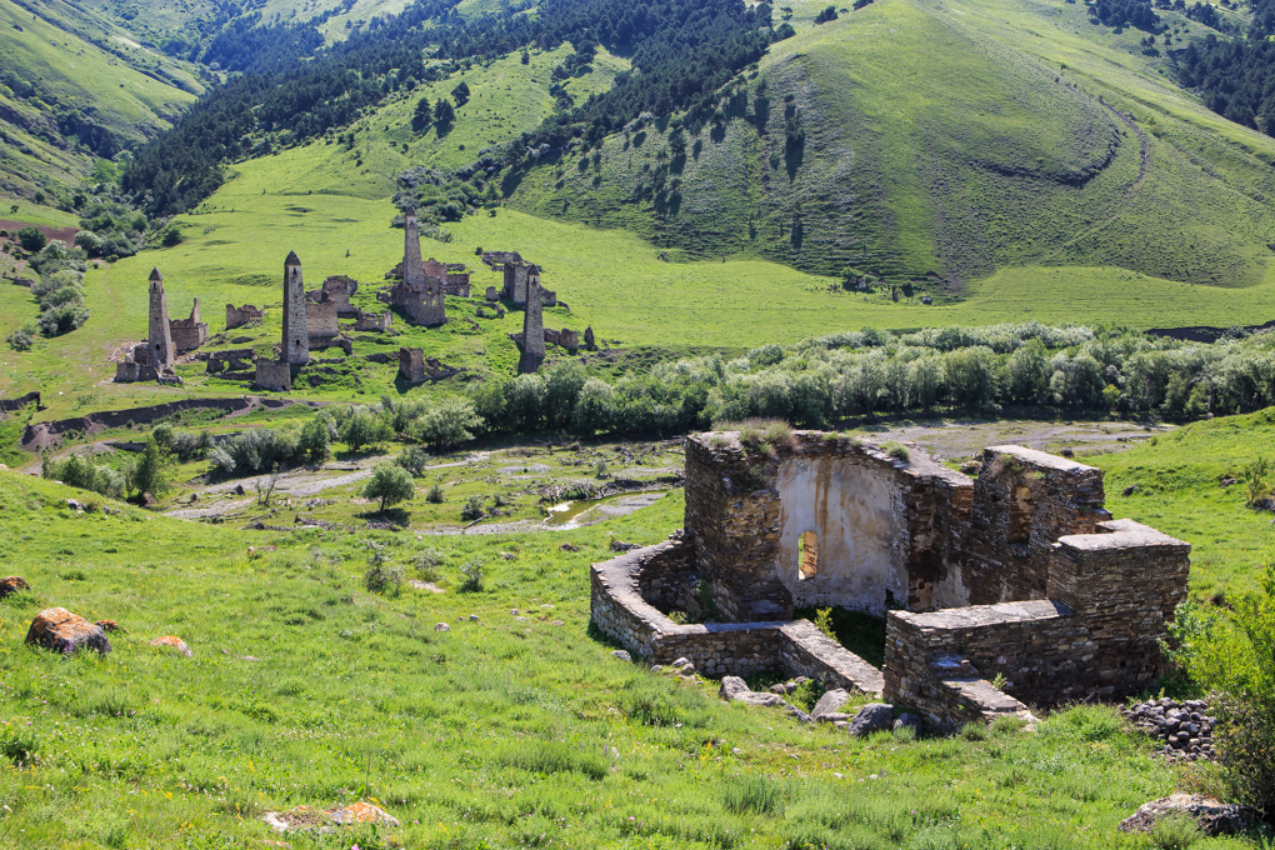
- Alby-Yerdy temple near Targim

- Location within Republic of Ingushetia

Religion
- Affiliation: Christianity, Vainakh religion
- Year consecrated: VII-X centuries
- Status: not active

Location
- Location: Dzheyrakhsky District, Ingushetia, Russian Federation
- Interactive map of Alby-Yerdy; Альби-Ерды ალბი-ერდი
- Coordinates: 42.835089°N 44.9368863°E

The Alby-Yerdy (Ingush: Альби-Ерды; Georgian: ალბი-ერდი) are the ruins of the medieval church in Ingushetia, located on the left bank of the Assa River.

Tkhaba-Yerdy, also located in mountainous Ingushetia, is considered to be the oldest Christian church on the territory of the Russian Federation, though emerging evidence suggests that Alby-Yerdy may predate it. As a result of radiocarbon study, scientists date the architectural monument to 668-974. Following the opinion of most researchers, the temple is recognized as a Christian church, although numerous remains of sacrificial animals were found inside the church, indicating rituals of ancient Ingush religion.

The interior is plastered, and the church has entrances from the south and west. Of the windows on the south wall, only one—the central window—has survived, crowned with a horseshoe-shaped arch. Two massive pilasters extend from the facade of the south wall, with arch supports made of baked Georgian bricks at their upper sections. These appear to have supported the cylindrical vault arches of an annex that once stood on this side.

Faint traces of frescoes remain in the church’s interior, with visible outlines of halos and figure details. The artwork is executed in shades of blue and brown.

== See also ==
- Tkhaba-Yerdy

== Sources ==
- Muzhukhoev, M. B. (1998). "Изучение храма Алби-Ерды в Горной Ингушетии" [Exploring the Albi-Erdy Temple in Mountainous Ingushetia]. In Chakhkiev, D. Yu.; et al. (eds.). Новое в археологии и этнографии Ингушетии: Сборник статей [New in archeology and ethnography of Ingushetia: Collection of articles] (in Russian). Nalchik: El-Fa. pp. 5–14. ISBN 5-88195-312-6.
