= Armkhi =

River in the Caucasus

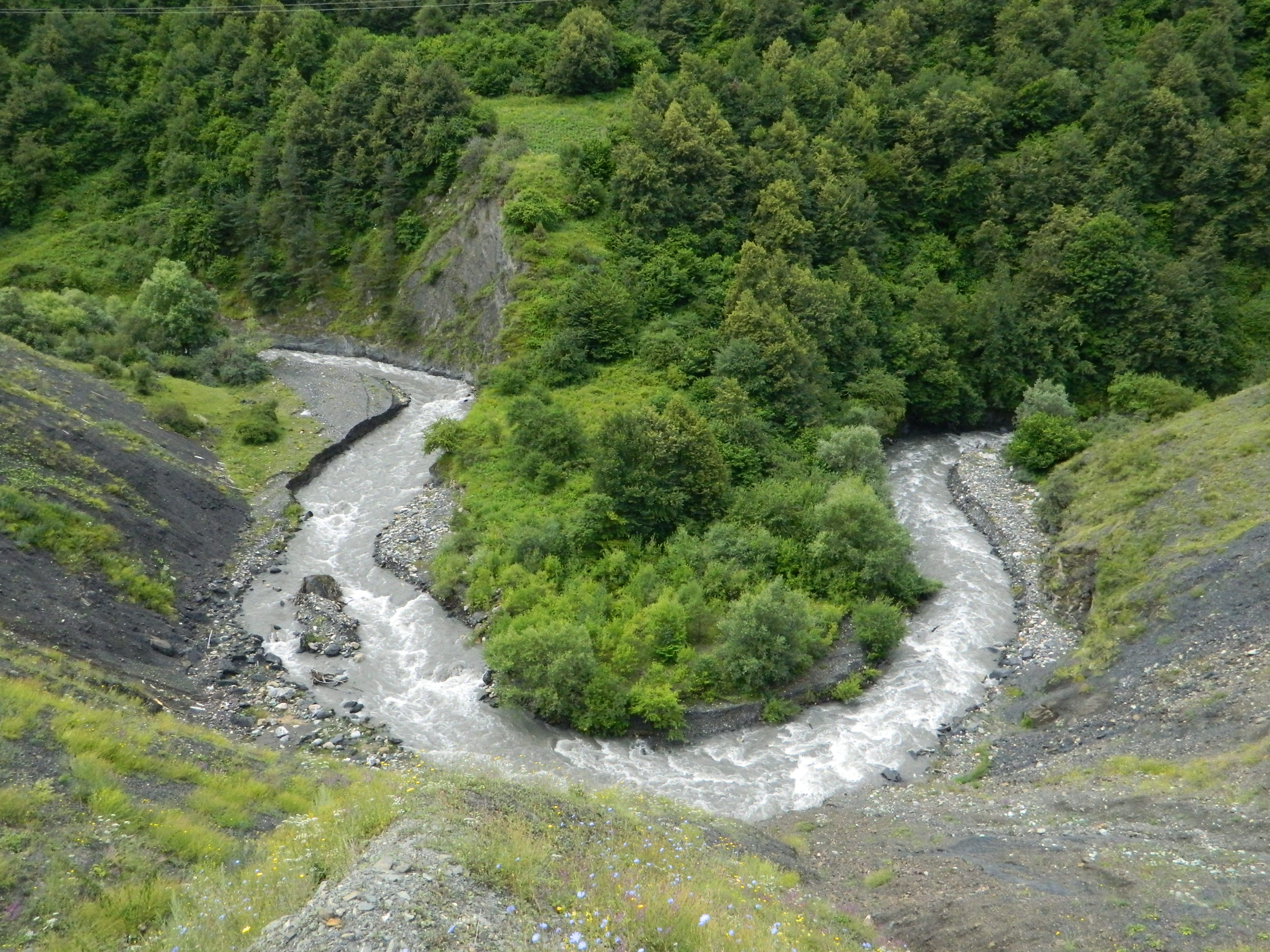
- Armkhi river near the village of Olgeti
- Interactive map of Armkhi
- Location of Armkhi
- Coordinates: 42°48′43″N 44°42′28″E
- Country: Russia
- Federal subject: Ingushetia

Population
  - Estimate (2024): 287 )
- Time zone: UTC+3 (MSK)
- Postal code: 386433
- OKTMO ID: 26620410116

Armkhi (Ingush: МохтIе, Moxthe; Russian: Армхи) is a village in Dzheyrakhsky District of the Republic of Ingushetia, located on the Armkhi or Kistinka river (Ingush: Ӏарам-хий, Кисти-хий, Aram-khi, Kisti-khiï; Georgian: ქისტეთისწყალი, Kistetistskali; Russian: Армхи, Кистинка). The village is known for its year-round recreation resort. Armkhi is one of six rural localities constituting the Dzheyrakh rural settlement.

== History ==
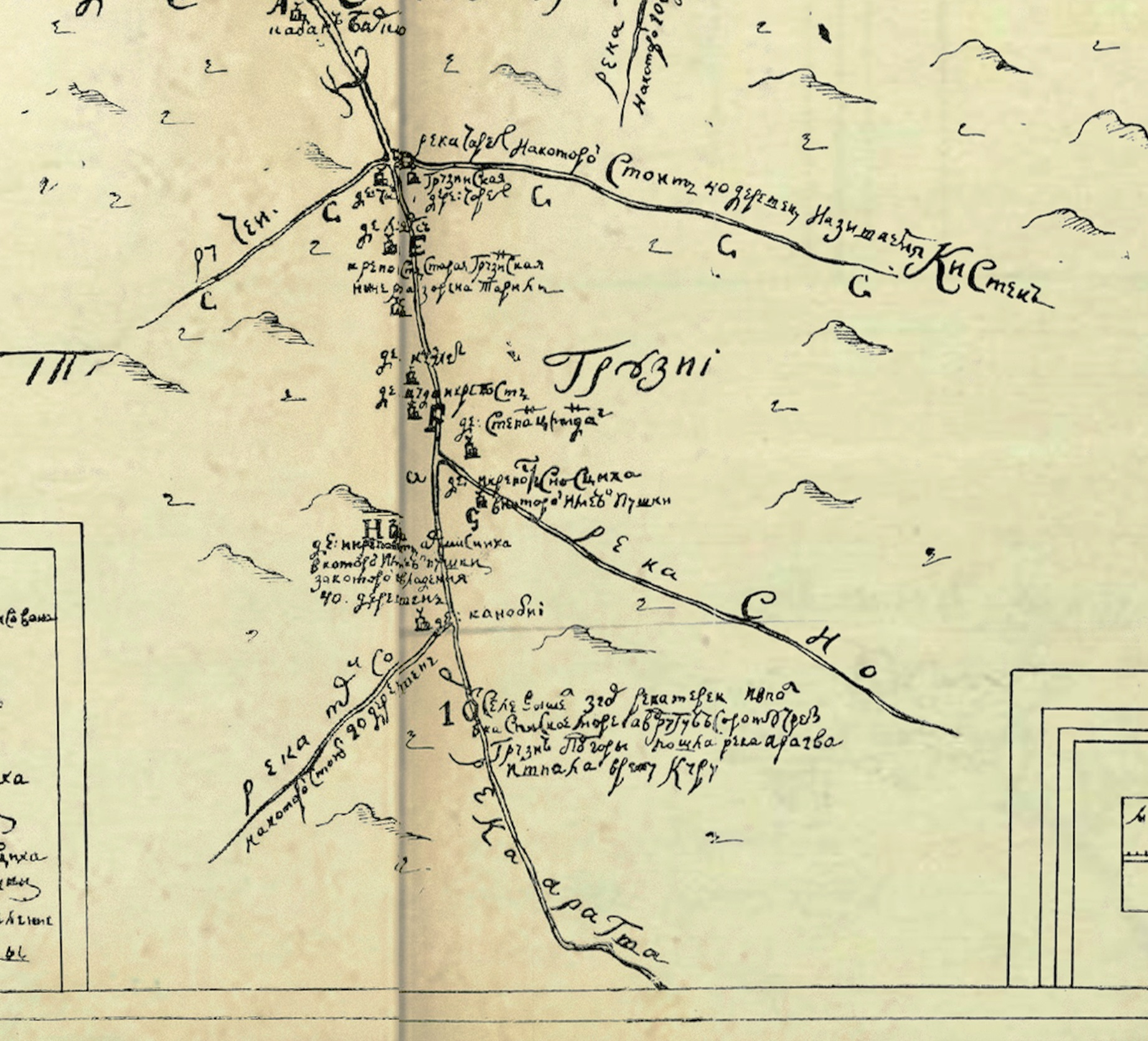
"The river Charekh on which there are 40 villages is called Kistek (Kistinka)" illustrated on General Levashov's map in 1733.

The name of the village derives from the river Armkhi, a tributary of the Terek river. Several variations exist with regard to the meaning of the term "Armkhi". One is that the toponym derives from Ingush for "prohibited water/river"; another, that it comes from the Ingush words amr 'lake' and khi 'water'.

The hydronym Kistinka derives from one of the old Ingush ethnonyms — Kisti.
In 1745, Prince Vakhushti of Kartli mentions it as "Kistetian river" as well as "Kist-Durdzukian river".

Doctor of historical sciences and archaeologist Evgeniy Krupnov wrote:

The ancient habitat of the Kists or Kistins is determined quite accurately. It is the Armkhi gorge — the right tributary of the Terek, 22 km south of the city of Ordzhonikidze, because this river was called in Georgian "Kistetistskali" and "Kistinka" in Russian sources; neighboring Ossetians call it "Makal-don".

— Е.И. Крупнов, «Средневековая Ингушетия» - М.: Наука, 1971. / с. 29

In 1928 a sanatorium was established adjacent to the village, making it one of the oldest sanatoriums in the North Caucasus. The modern building of the sanatorium was constructed in 1998. Recently a ski resort was built, along with a hotel, pools and a year-round recreation center.

== Demography ==
Armkhi population
- 2012: 136
- 2013: 140
- 2015: 156
- 2016: 158

== Geography ==
Armkhi village lies on the left embankment of the Armkhi River. The closest rural localities to Armkhi are Beini to the northeast, Dzheyrakh to the northwest, and Lyazhgi and Olgeti to the east.
