= Beyni rural settlement =

Beyni rural settlement Сельское поселение Бейн
- Interactive map of Beyni rural settlement
- Location of Beyni rural settlement
- Coordinates: 42°50′05″N 44°42′53″E
- Country: Russia
- Federal subject: Ingushetia

Population
  - Estimate (2025): 243 )
- Time zone: UTC+3 (MSK)
- OKTMO ID: 26620440

Beyni rural settlement is a municipal entity, one of the five rural settlements in Dzheyrakhsky District in the Republic of Ingushetia, Russia.

The rural locality consists of six rural settlements, including its administrative center selo Beyni.

== Demography ==
Historical population
Year	Pop.	±%
2012	58	—
2013	72	+24.1%
2014	80	+11.1%
2015	81	+1.2%
2016	89	+9.9%
2017	98	+10.1%
2018	94	−4.1%
2019	102	+8.5%
2020	95	−6.9%
2021	207	+117.9%

== Administrative structure ==
Number	Rural locality	Type of rural locality	Population (2016)
1	Beyni	selo, administrative center	89
2	Govzt	selo	
3	Dukhurgisht	selo	
4	Kasheti	selo	
5	Khiastmaghe	selo	
6	Oban	selo	
