= Assa (river) =

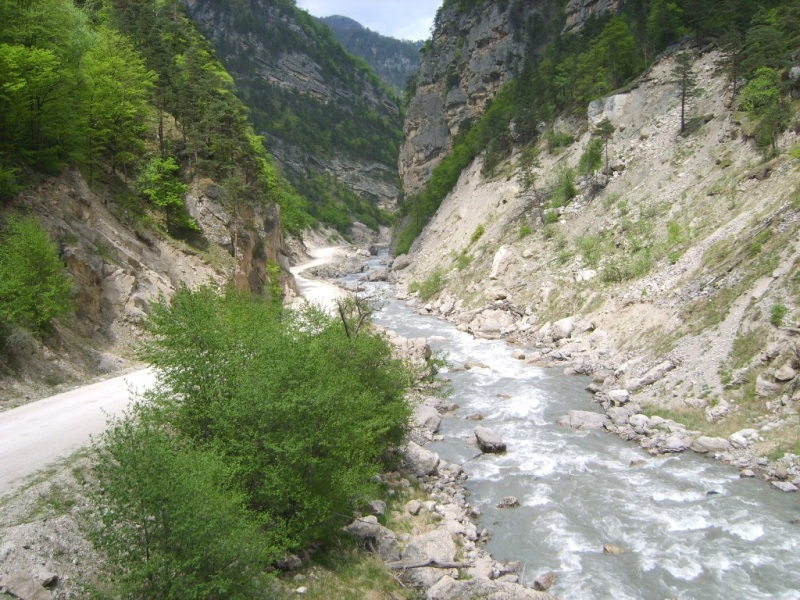
- The Assa valley (Ingushetia)

Location
- Countries: Georgia and Russia

Physical characteristics
- Source
  - coordinates: 42°39′30″N 44°54′29″E
- Mouth: Sunzha
  - coordinates: 43°15′17″N 45°24′55″E
- Length: 133 km (83 mi)
- Basin size: 2,060 km^{2} (800 sq mi)

Basin features
- Progression: Sunzha→ Terek→ Caspian Sea
- Tributaries
  - right: Fortanga, Guloykhi

The Assa (Note: Russian: Асса; Ingush: Эса-хий, romanized: Esa-xiy, IPA: [ˈɛsə‿ˌxiː]; Chechen: Ӏаьса, romanized: Jäsa, IPA: [ˈʕæsə]; Georgian: ასა, ღლიღვის-წყალი, romanized: asa, ghlighvis-ts'q'ali (Note: Prince Vakhushti of Kartli calls the river Ghlighvis-ts’q’ali (ღლიღვის-წყალი), which translates as 'Ghalghai river'.)) is a right tributary of the Sunzha in Georgia and Russia. It flows through the Dusheti Municipality of Mtskheta-Mtianeti in Georgia as well as Dzheyrakhsky and Sunzhensky Districts of Ingushetia and in Sernovodsky and Achkhoy-Martanovsky Districts of Chechnya, Russia.

== Etymology ==
The river is connected by some authors with the Alans in its ethnonym Yasy, as known in the Russian sources.

== Geography ==
It measures 133 kilometres (83 mi) long, and incorporates a drainage basin which is 2,060 square kilometres (800 mi^{2}). The basin includes the major part of Ingushetia, areas in the west of Chechnya, as well as minor areas in the north of Georgia. Within the river basin, more than 70% of the territory is subjected to avalanches.

The river's source is on the northern slopes of the Greater Caucasus in Khevsureti from where it flows north and crosses into Russia. The Assa accepts the Guloykhi from the right and flows through the Erzi Nature Reserve. North of the stanitsa of Nesterovskaya, the Assa turns east, crosses into Chechnya, flows through the stanitsa of Assinovskaya, and accepts the Fortanga from the right. The mouth of the Assa is at the locality of Zakan-Yurt. The principal tributary of the Assa is the Fortanga (right).

The Assa and Terek also flow through the Republic of Ingushetia in a south to north direction. The Assa, Terek and Gulaykhi river valleys are known for their large complex of stone battle towers and dwellings, burial crypts, pagan sanctuaries, and Christian churches". The Ingushes culture of the North Caucasus, one of the ancient cultures, is well preserved here by the Dzheyrakh-Assa Historical and Architectural State Museum. The village of Alkhaste is situated on the river's left bank, while the rural locality of Samashki is located on the river's outskirts. The village of Alkun is split in two by the river Assa into Lower and Upper Alkun.

The climate in the river valley is characterized as having a frequent drying effect which supports special microzones.

== History ==
In the Middle Ages, a mine was located on the right bank, measuring 1 kilometre (0.6 mi) in length and 200 to 250 metres (660 to 820 ft) in width. Finds included an iron bar and working of native gold.

Though construction of a railway tunnel was envisaged from Georgia to Russia in the 1980s, including passage through the Assa River valley, construction was suspended a decade later.

== Reservation ==
The upper reaches of the Assa and the Armhi have been combined into a natural reservation called the Dzheyrakh-Assa Museum-Reserve, which has canyon valleys. Its historical importance is due to the medieval Christian Temple of 12th century and several other structures of Bronze Age (9th through 6th centuries BC), 300 towers of the 16th and 17th centuries which are habitable and where battles were fought, and 18 human habitats including 200 vaults dated to the same era. For these historical reasons, the Jeyrakh-Assa Reservation has been proposed to be inscribed as a UNESCO World Heritage Site.

== See also ==
- Dzheyrakh-Assa Museum-Reserve
- Asa Managed Reserve

== Bibliography ==
- Гольдштейн, А. Ф. (1977). Башни в горах [Towers in the mountains] (PDF) (in Russian). Москва: Советский художник. pp. 1–331.
- Джанашвили, М. Г. (1897). Известия грузинских летописей и историков о Северном Кавказе и России [Bulletin of Georgian chronicles and historians about the North Caucasus and Russia] (in Russian). Тифлис: Типография К.П. Козловского. Головинский пр.. № 12. pp. 1–209.
