= Dzheyrakh =

Dzheyrakh Джейрах
- Rural locality

Other transcription(s)
  - Ingush: ЖӀайрах, ДжӀайрахь
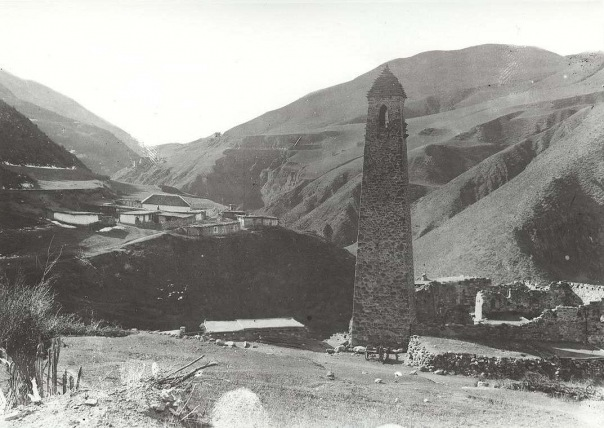
- Battle tower. Dzheyrakh. 1921
- Interactive map of Dzheyrakh
- Location of Dzheyrakh Dzheyrakh (Republic of Ingushetia)
- Coordinates: 42°49′N 44°41′E
- Country: Russia
- Federal subject: Ingushetia

Population (2010 Census)
  - Total: 1,781
  - Estimate (2024): 2,216 (+24.4%)

Administrative status
  - Capital of: Dzheyrakhsky District
- Time zone: UTC+3 (MSK)
- Postal code: 386430
- OKTMO ID: 26620410101

Dzheyrakh (Ingush: ДжӀайрахь, romanized: Dƶayraẋ, IPA: [ˈ(d)ʒəɪɾəħ]; Russian: Джейрах) is a village and the administrative center of Dzheyrakhsky District, in the Republic of Ingushetia, Russia.

== Etymology ==
The name "Dzheyrakh" is associated with the Arabic name Jarrah ("inflicting wounds"). According to Suleymanov, the name of the village is associated with Arab military commander Djarakh ibn Abadallah al-Khakami, who was a vicar of the Arab caliph in Armenia and northern Iran between 724 and 730 A.D. According to the notion, Al-Jarrah ibn Abdallah led military campaign in the Northern Caucasus through the Darial Gorge. A connection with the word Ingush zhar (жӏар) — cross, is also possible.

== Geography ==
Dzheyrakh is situated on the left bank of Armkhi river, south-west from the capital of Ingushetia, Magas.

== History ==
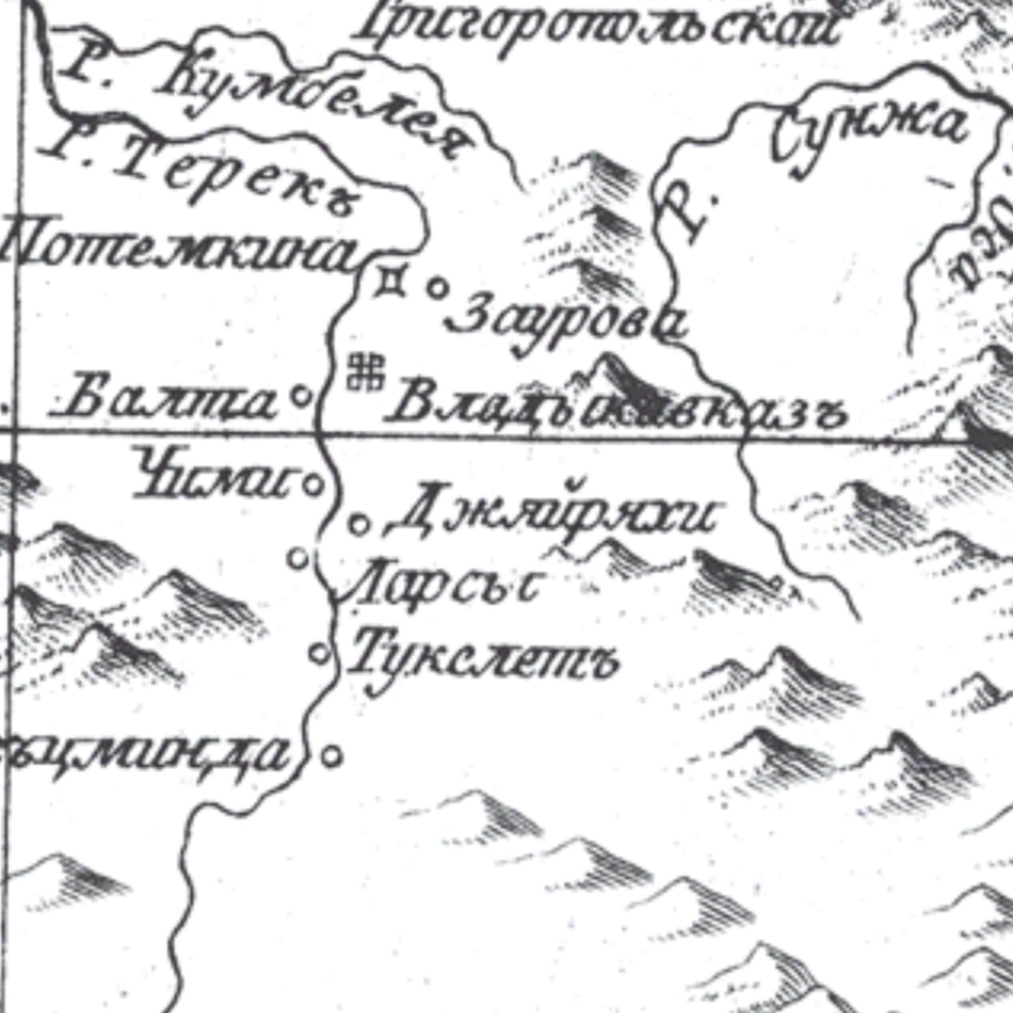
Fragment of the map of "Caucasian governorship and the Lands of the Don Cossacks" made by Aleksandr Vilbretkh in 1792 showing Dzhyayryakhi (Dzheyrakh).

The history of Dzheyrakh, a village in the Republic of Ingushetia, dates back to the end of the 16th century to the beginning of the 17th century, when the Ingush society (shakhar) of Dzheyrakhoy was formed. The inhabitants of this society were also referred to as "Erokhan people." The first recorded mention of the village of Dzheirakh can be found in the Georgian historian Vakhushti Bagrationi's "Geography of Georgia," written in 1745.

According to historical records, Dzheyrakh was founded by the Ingush families of the Tsurovs and Lyanovs, who established two villages. The first recorded interaction between the Dzheyrakhites and the Russians occurred in 1830, during General Abkhazov's expedition.

Since October 1993, Dzheyrakh has served as the administrative center of the Dzheyrakhsky district.

== Demographics ==
Historical population
Year	Pop.	±%
2002	1,064	—
2006	1,234	+16.0%
2007	1,251	+1.4%
2008	1,275	+1.9%
2009	1,299	+1.9%
2010	1,513	+16.5%
2011	1,701	+12.4%
2012	1,676	−1.5%
2013	1,715	+2.3%
2015	1,755	+2.3%
2016	1,781	+1.5%
2019	1,844	+3.5%

== Gallery ==
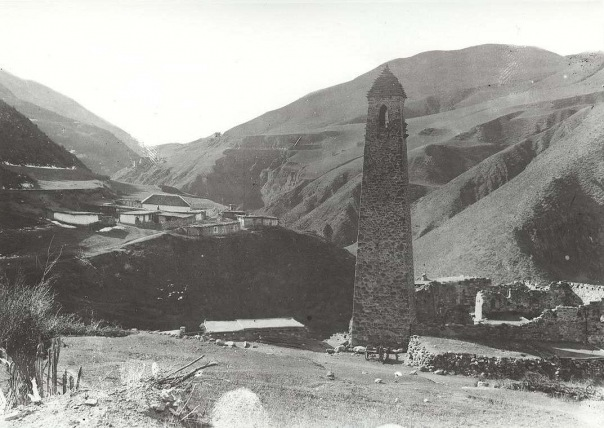
Battle tower of Dzheyrakh village. 1921

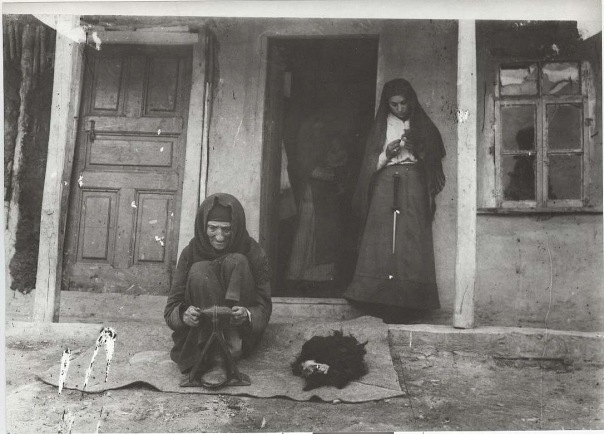
Woman combing wool on a comb, Dzheyrakh village 1921

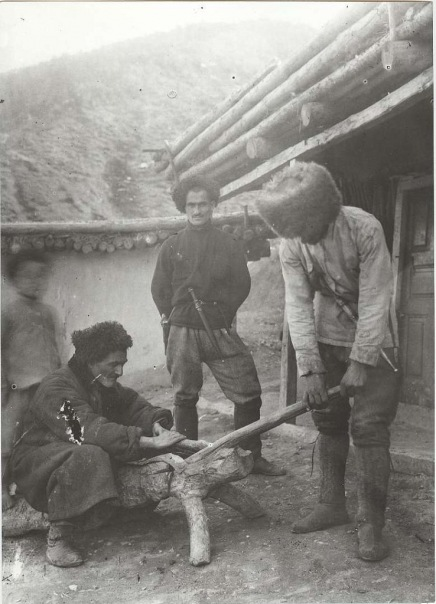
Men at work on a wooden tanning drum, Dzheyrakh village 1921

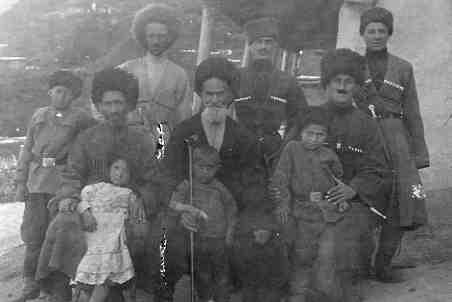
Group of residents of the settlement of Dzherakh 1925

== Bibliography ==
- Ужахов, М.Г (1927). Ингушско-русский словарь (in Ingush and Russian). Владикавказ: Крайнациздат. pp. 1–185.
- Гадло, А.В. (1979). Этническая история Северного Кавказа IV—X вв (in Russian). Ленинград: Ленинградского университета. pp. 1–217.
- Сулейманов, А. С (1978). Топонимия Чечено-Ингушетии. Часть 2. Горная Ингушетия (юго-запад) и Чечня (центр и юго-восток) (in Russian). Грозный: Чечено-Ингушское Книжное Издательство. pp. 1–233.
