= Dzheyrakhsky District =

Dzheyrakhsky District Джейрахский район (Russian)
- District

Other transcription(s)
  - Ingush: ЖӀайраха шахьар
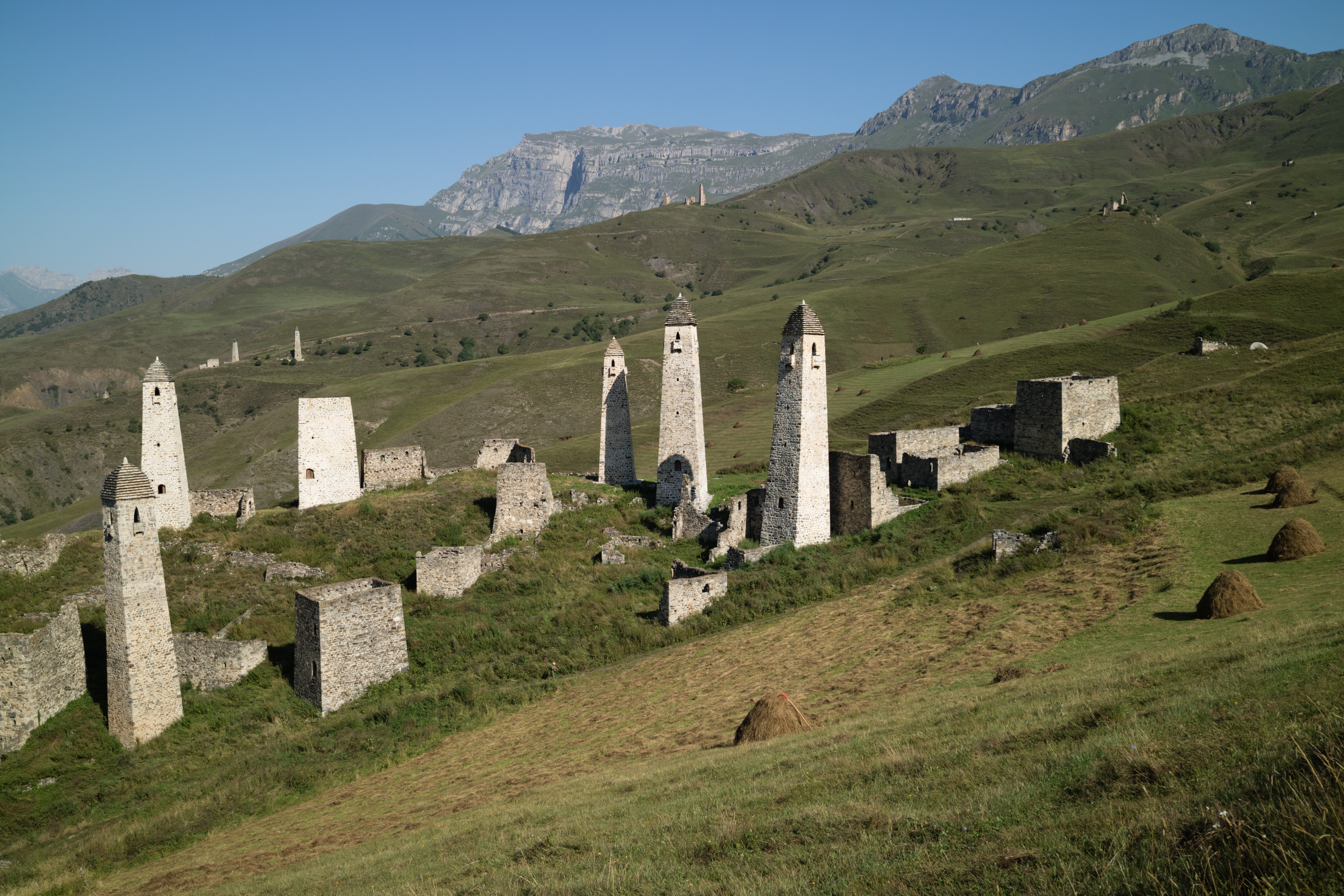
- Defense towers in the selo of Erzi in Dzheyrakhsky District

- Flag Coat of arms
- Location of Dzheyrakhsky District in the Republic of Ingushetia
- Coordinates: 42°48′N 44°54′E
- Country: Russia
- Federal subject: Republic of Ingushetia
- Established: October 1993
- Administrative center: Dzheyrakh

Area
  - Total: 628.14 km^{2} (242.53 sq mi)

Population (2010 Census)
  - Total: 2,638
  - Density: 4.200/km^{2} (10.88/sq mi)
  - Urban: 0%
  - Rural: 100%

Administrative structure
  - Inhabited localities: 85 rural localities

Municipal structure
  - Municipally incorporated as: Dzheyrakhsky Municipal District
  - Municipal divisions: 0 urban settlements, 5 rural settlements
- Time zone: UTC+3 (MSK)
- OKTMO ID: 26620000
- Website: http://www.jeyrah.ru

Population of Dzheyrakhsky District
- 2010 Census: 2,638
- 2002 Census: 2,334

Dzheyrakhsky District (Russian: Джейрахский район; Ingush: ЖӀайраха шахьар, romanized: Ƶjayraxa şaẋar, pronounced [ˈʒəɪɾəxə ˈʃɑħəɾ]) is an administrative and municipal district (raion), one of the four in the Republic of Ingushetia, Russia. It is located in the south of the republic. The area of the district is 628.14 square kilometers (242.53 sq mi). Its administrative center is the rural locality (a selo) of Dzheyrakh. As of the 2010 Census, the total population of the district was 2,638, with the population of Dzheyrakh accounting for 57.4% of that number.

== History ==
The district was established in October 1993.

== Administrative structure ==
Number	Rural settlement	Administrative center	Number of localities	Population (2016)
1	Dzheyrakh rural settlement	selo Dzheyrakh	6	1939
2	Beyni rural settlement	selo Beyni	6	89
3	Guly rural settlement	selo Guly	60	244
4	Lyazhgi rural settlement	selo Lyazhgi	5	275
5	Olgetti rural settlement	Olgetti	8	336

== Administrative and municipal status ==
Within the framework of administrative divisions, Dzheyrakhsky District is one of the four in the Republic of Ingushetia and has administrative jurisdiction over all of its eighty-five rural localities. As a municipal division, the district is incorporated as Dzheyrakhsky Municipal District. Its eighty-five rural localities are incorporated into five rural settlements within the municipal district. The selo of Dzheyrakh serves as the administrative center of both the administrative and municipal district.

== Culture ==
The Dzheyrakh-Assin historical and architectural museum and nature reserve, which includes the Tkhaba-Yerdy Church, is located within the district.
