= Feappii =

Ingush subgroup

Фаьппий
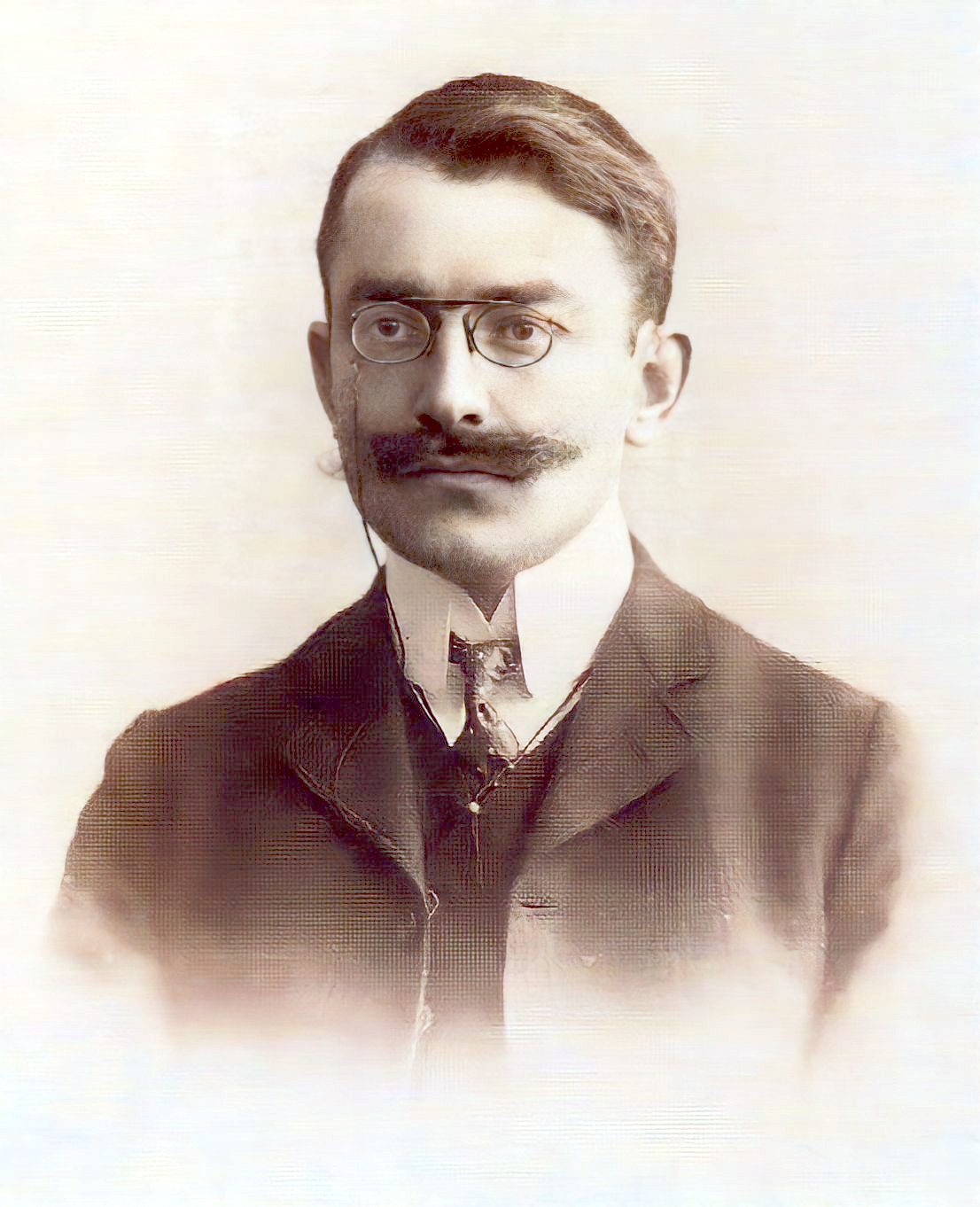
- Vassan-Girey Jabagiyev, a representative of the Feappii

Total population
- 2071 (1830)

Regions with significant populations
- Ingushetia, Dagestan

Languages
- Ingush

Religion
- Sunni Islam

Related ethnic groups
- Bats people

The Feappii (Ingush: Фаьппий, romanized: Fäppiy, IPA: [ˈfɛ̯æpːiː]) were an Ingush subgroup (society) that mostly inhabited the mountainous Fappi region of Ingushetia in the Caucasus. Historically, they bordered on the west with Dzherakh, on the east with Khamkhins, on the north with Nazranians, and in the south with Gudomakarians. The center of the society was the fortified village (aul) of Erzi or Metskhal.

During the 16th and 17th centuries, part of the Feappii migrated to Tusheti, Georgia, due to a lack of land. The descendants of the migrants are known as Bats people. In the 17th and 18th centuries, another wave of migration occurred, to the region of Aukh (modern-day Dagestan).

In 1733, due to concerns about the expansion of the Ottoman Turks in the region, the Feappii, together with the Dzherakhs and Khamkhins, established ties with the Kingdom of Kartli. As the Russian Empire began expanding its territories in the Caucasus region in the 19th century, the Caucasian War broke out. During the war, the Feappii Society was devastated after a Russian punitive expedition in 1830.

After the end of the Caucasian War, the Feappii became part of various okrugs of the Terek Oblast, which in turn was part of the Caucasus Viceroyalty. These included the Voeynno-Ossetian okrug, Ingush okrug, Vladikavkazsky Okrug, Sunzhensky Otdel, and the Nazran okrug.

== Etymology ==
=== Endonyms ===
The endonym of the Feappii in their native Ingush language is фаьппий (Fäppij in old Ingush Latin writing system).

Foma Gorepekin translated the ethnonym in Ingush language as "settlers marching in a discordant crowd". Similarly, Rusudan Kharadze and Aleksey Robakidze made a hypothesis that the ethnonym might be connected with the term "alien/new settler" (but not as ethnically different from the main mass of Ingush). According to linguist Yu. Desheriyev, the ethnonym has no etymological explanation. Anatoly Genko connected the name in the form of Veppiy with the Khazar king Uobos, mentioned in the Georgian Chronicles, thus dating the name back to the 10th century AD.

=== Exonyms ===
Historically, the Feappii were known by the exonym of Georgian origin as Kists or Kistins, along with its variants such as Nearby Kists or Nearby Kistins. These terms later appeared in Russian literature. Eventually, the meaning of this ethnonym expanded to cover all Nakh peoples, despite originally referring specifically to the Feappii. The Kist ethnonym was replaced by the term "Metskhalins" in the 19th century, and the Kistin society became known as the "Metskhalin society" respectively, after the chancellery of the society was transferred to Metskhal.

The Ossetians referred to the Feappii as Maqqal (Мæхъхъæл), and the river Armkhi, on which the society was situated, as Maqqaldon (Мæхъхъæлдон), which lent its name to one of the Russian names for Armkhi, Makaldon (Макалдон). The ethnonym Maqqal was infrequently used to denote Feappii on some maps. (Note: For instance, Karte von dem Kaukasischen Isthmus und von Armenien 1850; Karte der Kaukasus-Länder und der angränzenden türkischen und persischen Provinzen Armenien, Kurdistan und Azerbeidjan 1854) This ethnonym is linked to the Ingush and Ossetian word for Kite, Maqqal (Маккхал/Мæхъхъæл). According to Anatoly Genko, the Ossetians derived this name from the aul of Erzi and its inhabitants, the Erzians.

== History ==
=== Early history ===
One of the mountainous Ingush societies, (Note: Martirosian 1928, p. 12; Krupnov 1971, p. 37; Volkova 1973, p. 151, 160–161; Volkova 1974, p. 153; Bennigsen & Wimbush 1985, p. 185; Kuznetsov 2004, p. 41; Gorepekin 2006, p. 14) the Feappins inhabited the mountainous Fappi region of Ingushetia in the Caucasus. The Feappins bordered Dzheyrakh to the west, the Khamkhins to the east, the Nazranians to the north, and the Gudomakarians to the south.

Historically, the Feappins were known by the exonym of Georgian origin as Kists or Kistins, along with other variants such as Nearby Kists or Nearby Kistins. The region where they resided was referred to as "Kistetia", as well as "Kistia" or "Kistinia". (Note: One of the earliest mentions of this toponym is found in the work Description of the Kingdom of Georgia by the 18th-century Georgian eristavi, historian, and geographer Prince Vakhushti of Kartli. He localized it along the Gorge of the Armkhi river (historical "Kistinka"), situated in mountainous Ingushetia.) The first recorded mention of Kists dates back to the 7th century, in the work Ashkharhatsuyts, where it appeared in the form Kusts. However, in that context, it was used to generally describe the Ingush people, not specifically the Feappins.

According to the ethnographer Chakh Akhriev, the Feappin society traces its foundation to Prince Kist, who settled in the region and founded the village of Erzi. From him descended the Oartskhoy clan of Erzi, with the Yandiev and Mamilov families as its principal branches, whose members were recognized as the ruling princes of Kistetia (the Feappii society).

During the 16th to 17th centuries, a portion of the Feappins migrated to Tusheti, Georgia, in search of land. (Note: As noted by Nataliya Volkova, "the resettlement of the Fappians to Tusheti is not chronologically determined." However, if the comparison made by Anatoly Genko of the Batskiye grebeny mentioned in Russian documents with the Bats people is correct, then the Fyappins were already present in Tusheti by the end of the 16th century. Additionally, Nataliya Volkova mentions various legends of the Bats and Ingush peoples. The Bats legends date the migration of the Fyappins to the times of Abbas the Great of the Safavid Empire. Nataliya Volkova and Leonid Lavrov, in a different work, date the migration no earlier than the 16th century.) Today, the descendants of these Feappins are known as the Bats people. Another wave of migration occurred in the 17th to 18th centuries to the region of Aukh (modern-day Dagestan). Today, the descendants of those migrants are known as the Vyappiy and refer to Tyarsh as their ancestral village, as evidenced by their family chronicle (teptar):

Their fathers left the village of Tyarsh in the Vabo District on a high mountain near the Buruv fortress. Tyarsh is the name of their eldest father.

In 1733, fearing the expansion of the Ottoman Turks, the Feappins, Dzherakhs and Khamkhins wrote a letter to Vakhtang VI, declaring their oath of allegiance to Kartli. The letter was signed by 16 representatives from leading surnames of the Feappin, Dzherakh, and Khamkhin communities.

=== Contacts with Russia and incorporation into Russia ===
On January 8, 1811, foremen from 13 Feappin villages swore allegiance to the Russian Empire. (Note: The 13 villages included Erzi with 50 households, Tyarsh with 29, (Upper Khuli) with 29, Lower Khuli with 20, Kharp with 18, Koshke with 15, Morch with 10, Garak with 28, Metskhal with 10, Falkhan with 30, Beyni with 20, Lyazhgi with 30, and Furtoug with 29.) However, both the Ingush and Russian sides viewed such oaths more as treaty agreements than actual submission.

In 1823-1824, alongside early military and administrative measures, the Russian authorities supported missionary campaigns organized by the Georgian Exarchate to establish Orthodox Christianity in the region. The mission launched its campaign at Erzi, selecting it as its first destination due to its status as the largest settlement and primary center of the Feappin society. Ecclesiastical reports note that the society deferred major political and religious decisions to the Yandiev (Andiashvili) clan of Erzi, recognized in Georgian correspondence as the ruling paramount chiefs (khevistavi) of the region. The Feappins initially refused to be baptized, stating that they would act according to the decisions of their khevistavi. A violent clash then broke out, resulting in the death of a prominent mediator, Faraga Yandiev (Andiashvili), and the wounding of three others. The situation was subsequently resolved through an agreement with the Yandievs, which secured local cooperation and enabled a baptism to take place in Erzi, comprising 39 households and 310 individuals. The remaining settlements soon followed. By late 1824, a total of 2,549 individuals were baptized across the Feappin society, leading to the designation of regional parishes for the construction of permanent churches, notably in Erzi, Eban, Khuli and Dzheyrakh. Throughout the campaign, the expedition party was protected and supported by members of influential clans, including the Yandievs, Tsurovs, Khamatkhanovs, Mamilovs, Dudarovs and Kazbegis, who acted as key intermediaries with the population.

During the Caucasian War, the Feappins were targeted by Russian expansion efforts. In July 1830, two Russian columns led by Major General Abkhazov embarked on a punitive expedition to mountainous Ingushetia. The Russian forces traversed the Darial and Assa Gorges, encountering fierce resistance, particularly from the inhabitants of Eban. As a result of this expedition, the Feappins were temporarily subdued by the Russian Empire, and their villages (auls) devastated. This marked the establishment of district courts and civil governance in mountainous Ingushetia. Following the general uprising of Chechnya in March 1840, during which Chechens aligned with the Caucasian Imamate, Pavel Grabbe reported that the Kists (i.e., Feappins) were either sympathetic to or aligned with the Caucasian Imamate.

Whole Greater Chechnya was transferred to him, as well as the Michik and Ichkerin residents and many Aukhites; the Kachkalyks are kept in obedience only by the presence of our detachment. Some of the Karabulak and Ingush villages, all the Galgai and Kists are also in great agitation and are secretly or openly assisting the rebel.

Within the Russian Empire, the Feappins were part of the Ossetian-Military Okrug (1857–1862), the Ingush okrug (1862–1871), the Vladikavkazsky okrug (1871–1888), the Sunzhensky otdel (1888–1909), and the Nazran okrug (1909–1920).

=== Modern ===
During the Russian Civil War, the self-proclaimed state of the Mountainous Republic of the Northern Caucasus emerged in the Caucasus region, with Vassan-Girey Dzhabagiev, a Feappin representative, serving as its finance minister. (Note: Dzhabagievs are part of the Tochievs, a Fyappin surname, native to the mountainous aul of Metskhal.) He also led the Ingush National Council.

In 1944, the Ingush people (including Feappins) were deported to Central Asia. They were only allowed to return in 1957, after Nikita Khrushchev reversed many of Josif Stalin's policies, including the mentioned deportation. Feappin writer and poet Issa Kodzoev was repressed by the Soviet regime for addressing Stalin’s crimes. (Note: Kodzoevs are part of the Chulkhoy, a Fyappin clan (teip). Kodzoyevs are native to the mountainous aul of Kyazi.) In 1989, Kodzoev, along with other Feappin representatives like Sulambek Mamilov, was part of the committee for the revival of Ingush autonomy within the Russian SFSR of the Soviet Union. (Note: Mamilovs are part of the Oartskhoy, a Fyappin clan (teip). Native to the mountainous aul of Erzi.)

Today, Feappin descendants live across Ingushetia.

== Composition ==
Feappin society consisted of the following fortified villages (auls), tribal organizations (teips), and surnames (nyaqhash/vyarash): (Note: The information in the table is based on several archive documents such as: "List of populated locations of the Voeynno-Ossetinskiy Okrug" (1859), "List of residents of the Gorsky Uchastok of the Ingushskiy Okrug, with testimony against everyone who, how many have their own arable hay days of land" (1864) and "List of mountain villages of the Kuban and Terek Oblasts" (1869). The orthography of the teips and nyaqhash/vyarash was mainly based on the work "Onomasticon of Ingushetia", while the information regarding which auls they inhabit/inhabited is mainly based on the information from Zaurbek Malsagov and Shukri Dakhkilgov.)

Auls	Teips and nyaqhash/vyarash
Beyni (Бейни)	Keligovs (Келигнаькъан), Murzabekovs (Марзбикнаькъан), Torshkhoy (Тӏоаршхой) (Note: Including Bersanovs (Берсанаькъан), Mestoy (Местой) and Shovkhalovs (Шовхалнаькъан).)
Byalgan (Баьлгӏане)	
Bisht (Бишт)	Beshtoy (Бештой)
Eban (Эбане)	Ebankhoy (Эбанхой): Tsitskiyevs (Цискнаькъан)
Erzi (Аьрзи)	Oartskhoy (Оарцхой): Yandievs (Янданаькъан), Aldaganovs (Алдагӏнаькъан), Mamilovs (Мамилнаькъан), Burazhevs (Буражнаькъан), Buruzhevs (Буружнаькъан)
Garak (Гаракх)	Garakoy (Гаракой)
Goust (Гӏовзтӏе)	Ebankhoy (Эбанхой): Akhilgovs (Ахильгнаькъан)
Guli (Хьули)	Khulkhoy (Хьулахой)
Dukhargisht (Духьаргишт)	Kushtovs (Куштнаькъан)
Kasheti (Кашетӏе)	
Kerbite (Кербӏитӏе)	Oartskhoy (Оарцхой)
Keyrakh (Кхерахье)	Korokhoy (Корохой): Tankievs, Esmurzievs, Askhievs, Batyzhevs, Gireevs, Muruzhevs, Chasigovs, Chumakovs, Bogatyrevs, Shakrievs
Khamishk (Хьамишк)	Chilievs (Чилинаькъан) Didigovs (Дидигнаькъан) Patievs (Патнаькъан) Mizievs (Мизинаькъан) Gumukovs (Гумукнаькъан) Torievs (Торинаькъан)
Kharp (Хьарп)	Matiyevs (Матенаькъан) Amerhanovs (Амерхананаькъан)
Khastmak (Хьастмоаке)	
Kiralt (Киралт)	Oartskhoy (Оарцхой)
Koshk (Къоашке)	
Lyazhgi (Лаьжг)	Lozkhoy (Лошхой) Khautiyevs (Ховтнаькъан)
Metskhal (Мецхал)	Dzhabagiyevs (Джабагӏнаькъан), Kotiyevs (Котнаькъан), Kusievs (Кусенаькъан), Tochiyevs (Тоачанаькъан)
Morch (Морч)	Morchkhoevs (Морчхой), Dzortovs (Дзортонаькъан), Yaryzhevs (Ярыжнаькъан), Ortskhanovs (Орцхонаькъан), Bagaevs (Баганаькъан)
Olgeti (Олгатӏе)	Evkurovs (Евкурнаькъан), Itarovs (Итаранаькъан), Buruzhevs (Буружнаькъан)
Shoan (Шоане)	Shoankhoy (Шоанхой)
Tyarsh (Тӏаьрш)	Gudantovs (Гӏудантнаькъан), Daskievs (Даскенаькъан), Doskhoy (Досхой), Murzabekovs (Марзбикнаькъан), Torshkhoy (Тӏоаршхой)
Falkhan (Фалхан)	Azhigovs (ӏажнаькъан), Bersanovs (Берсанаькъан), Keligovs (Келигнаькъан), Kotiyevs (Котнаькъан), Dzarakhovs (Зарахнаькъан), Umarovs (ӏумарнаькъан)
Including Chulkhoian auls
Gu (Гув)	Gukhoy (Гухой)
Khanikal (Ханикал)	
Khyani (Хаьни)	Khanievs (Хоаной)
Kyazi (Каьзи)	Kodzoyevs (Коазой)
Lyalakh (Лаьлах)	Lolokhoyevs (Лоалахой)
Magote (Маготе)	
Salgi (Салги)	Salgirkhoy (Салгирхой)

== Demographics ==
Year	Population	Source
1816	1 269 (Note: 1195 Christians and 74 Muslims.)	Document
1838	2 071	Document
1857	1 269	Adolf Berge
1883	1 749 (Note: 952 men and 797 women.)	Census
1890	1 924 (Note: 1001 men and 923 women.)	Census
1914	880 (Note: 468 men and 412 women.)	Census
Note: The information in the table pertains to the Fyappiy residing in the mountainous region, not those living in the lowlands of Ingushetia.

== Notable people ==
- Akhmed Kotiev, an Ingush employee of the MIA, secretary of the Security Council of the Republic of Ingushetia, and a hero of the Russian Federation. (Note: Kotiyevs are a Fyappin clan (teip). Native to the mountainous auls of Metskhal and Falkhan.)
- Akhmed Kotiev, an Ingush boxer and Minister of Physical Culture and Sports of the Republic of Ingushetia.
- Nazyr Mankiev, an Ingush wrestler and 2008 Olympic gold medalist. (Note: Mankievs are part of the Loshkhoy, a Fyappin clan (teip). Native to the mountainous aul of Lyazhgi.)
- Timur Matiev, an Ingush historian (Doctor of Sciences), Head of the Department of History of the Ingush State University. (Note: Matievs are a Fyappin clan (teip). Native to the mountainous aul of Kharp.)
- Bersnako Gazikov, an Ingush historian and archivist. (Note: Gazikovs are part of the Gelatkhoy, who are a Fyappin clan (teip) originating from Oartskhoy, another Fyappin clan. Native to the mountainous aul of Gveleti.)
- Nurdin Kodzoev, an Ingush historian and writer.
- Dzhemaldin Yandiev, the first Ingush people's poet, member of the Union of Soviet Writers, and chairman of the Union of Writers of Checheno-Ingushetia. (Note: Yandievs are part of the Oartskhoy, a Fyappin clan (teip). Native to the mountainous aul of Erzi.)
- Issa Kodzoev, an Ingush writer, poet, and teacher.
- Ruslan Mamilov, an Ingush artist, director, and sculptor.
- Tamara Yandieva, an Ingush artist and singer.
- Amur Amerkhanov, an Ingush artist, director, and singer. (Note: Amerkhanovs are part of the Matievs, a Fyappin clan (teip). Native to the mountainous aul of Kharp.)
- Mikhail Gutseriev, a high-profile Ingush businessman. (Note: Gutserievs are part of the Kodzoevs, who in turn, are part of the Chulkhoy, a Fyappin clan (teip). Kodzoevs are native to the mountainous aul of Kyazi.)
- Mukharbek Didigov, an Ingush politician, statesman, and engineer. (Note: Didigovs are part of the Gorokoy, a Fyappin clan (teip). Native to the mountainous aul of Khamishk.)
- Vassan-Girey Dzhabagiev, an Ingush educator, social thinker, major political and public figure, agricultural economist, and sociologist.
- Yunus-bek Yevkurov, a politician, Deputy Minister of Defence of the Russian Federation, former Head of Ingushetia. (Note: Yevkurovs are part of the Olgetkhoy, a Fyappin clan (teip). Native to the mountainous aul of Olgeti.)
- Magamet Djabrailovich Yandiev, a politician, former Speaker of the People's Assembly of the Republic of Ingushetia, and Head of the Administration of Sunzhensky District.
- Daut Aubakirovich Yandiev, a politician and agronomist, former Vice Premier of Ingushetia, Minister of Agriculture and Food of Ingushetia, and Minister of Agriculture.
- Muslim Alikhanovich Yandiev, a politician, former Minister of External Relations, National Policy, Press, and Information of the Republic of Ingushetia, and Mayor of Karabulak.
- Magomet Isaevich Yandiev, a politician and economist, former Minister of Economic Development, and Moscow City Duma deputy.
- Khasan Iragievich Yandiev, Deputy Chairman of the Supreme Court of Ingushetia, former Minister of Justice of Ingushetia, and Honored Lawyer of the Republic of Ingushetia; assassinated in 2008.
- Abdulaziz Djabrailovich Yandiev, an economist, former Minister of Finance of Ingushetia, head of the Federal Treasury Department of the Ministry of Finance of Russia in Ingushetia, and Assistant-Advisor to the Head of Ingushetia.
- Musa Alkhastovich Yandiev, a jurist and writer, former member of the People’s Assembly of Ingushetia, and former Minister for Public Relations and Interethnic Relations of Ingushetia.
- Mohammed Yandiev, a colonel of the Ministry of Internal Affairs of Ingushetia and former head of the republican department for combating organized crime; led the 1999 rescue of 89 elderly residents from Grozny during the Second Chechen War.
- Zaam Yandiev, a military and political figure, active participant in the First World War and the Russian Civil War on the side of the Reds, and commander of the Ingush cavalry brigade.
- Mussa Timurkoevich Sautiev, a military and political figure, chairman of the Defense Council of the Mountainous Republic of the Northern Caucasus and Commander of the Armed Forces of Red Ingushetia. (Note: Sautievs are part of the Torshkhoy, a Fyappin clan (teip). Native to the mountainous auls of Tyarsh, Beyni, and Falkhan.)
- Zarifa Sautieva, an Ingush activist. (Note: Sautievs are part of the Torshkhoy, a Fyappin clan (teip). Native to the mountainous auls of Tyarsh, Beyni, and Falkhan.)

== Bibliography ==
=== English sources ===
- Bennigsen, Alexandre; Wimbush, S. Enders (1985). Muslims of the Soviet Empire: A Guide. London: C. Hurst & Co. pp. 1–210. ISBN 1-85065-009-8.

=== German sources ===
- "Karte von dem Kaukasischen Isthmus und von Armenien / Entworfem und gezeichnet nach eigenem Houzontal - Aufnahmen und mit Benutzung der vorhandenen Materialen von Professor Dr. Karl Koch; H. Mahlmann sc" [Map of the Caucasus Isthmus and Armenia / Designed and drawn according to Houzontal's own Houzontal - Photographs and using the available materials by Professor Dr. Karl Koch; H. Mahlmann sc.]. www.bibliotecavirtual.defensa.gob.es (in German). 1850.
- Kiepert, Heinrich (1854). "Karte der Kaukasus-Länder und der angränzenden türkischen und persischen Provinzen Armenien, Kurdistan und Azerbeidjan : im Maasstabe von 1 :1,500000 / bearbeitet und gezeichnet von Dr. Heinrich Kiepert" [Map of the Caucasus countries and the adjacent Turkish and Persian provinces of Armenia, Kurdistan and Azerbeidjan: on a scale of 1:1.500000 / edited and drawn by Dr. Heinrich Kiepert] (in German).

=== Russian sources ===
- Almazov, I. G. (2015). "О Джабагиевых" [About the Dzhabagievs]. Наследие. Джабагиев Вассан-Гирей Эльджиевич [Heritage. Dzhabagiev Vassan-Girey Eldzhievich] (in Russian). Nazran-Magas, Ingushetia.
- Akhmadov, Sh. B. (2002). Yandarov, А. Д. (ed.). Чечня и Ингушетия в XVIII—начале XIX века [Chechnya and Ingushetia in the 18th – early 19th centuries] (in Russian). Elista: APP "Dzhangar". pp. 1–528.
- Bagrationi, V. (1904). География Грузии [Geography of Georgia] (in Russian). Translated by Janashvili, M. G. Tiflis: Tip. K. P. Kozlovskogo. pp. 1–290.
- Barakhoeva, N. M.; Kodzoev, N. D.; Khayrov, B. A. (2016). Ингушско-русский словарь терминов [Ingush-Russian dictionary of terms] (in Ingush and Russian) (2nd ed.). Nalchik: OOO "Tetragraf". pp. 1–288.
- Berzhe, А. П. (1857). "Краткій обзоръ горскихъ племенъ на Кавказѣ" [A brief overview of the mountain tribes in the Caucasus]. Кавказскій календарь на 1858 [Caucasian Calendar for 1858] (in Russian). Тифлисъ: Тип. Канцеляріи Намѣстника Кавказскаго. pp. 267–312.
- Berzhe, А. П. (1992) [1857]. Краткий обзор горских племен на Кавказе [Brief overview of the mountain tribes in the Caucasus] (in Russian) (2nd ed.). Nalchik: GP KBR "Respublikanskiy poligrafkombinat im. Revolyutsii 1905 g.". pp. 1–48.
- Vertepov, G. A. (1892). "Ингуши. Историко-статистический очеркъ" [Ingush. Historical and statistical essay]. In Maksimov, E.; Вертепов, Г. А. (eds.). Туземцы Северного Кавказа. Историко-статистические очерки. Выпуск первый. Осетины, ингуши, кабардинцы [Natives of the North Caucasus. Historical and statistical essays. First issue. Ossetians, Ingush, Kabardians] (in Russian). Владикавказъ: Tip. Obl. pr. Terskoy oblasti. pp. 71–138.
- Vinogradov, В. Б. (1966). Smirnov, K. F. (ed.). Тайны минувших времен [Secrets of past times] (PDF) (in Russian). Moskva: Nauka. pp. 1–167.
- Volkova, N. G.; Lavrov, L. I. (1968). Gardanov, V. K.; Prokhorov, E. D.; Efimova, А. П. (eds.). Культура и быт народов Северного Кавказа (1917—1967 гг.) (in Russian). Moskva: Nauka. pp. 1–345.
- Volkova, N. G. (1973). Lavrov, L. I. (ed.). Этнонимы и племенные названия Северного Кавказа [Ethnonyms and tribal names of the North Caucasus] (in Russian). Moskva: Nauka. pp. 1–210.
- Volkova, N. G. (1974). Gardanov, V. K. (ed.). Этнический состав населения Северного Кавказа в XVIII — начале XX века [Ethnic composition of the population of the North Caucasus in the 18th – early 20th centuries] (in Russian). Moskva: Nauka. pp. 1–276.
- Volkova, N. G. (1977). "Бацбийцы Грузии (Этнографические заметки)" [Batsbi of Georgia (Ethnographical notes)] (PDF). Sovetskaya etnografia (in Russian) (2). Moskva: Nauka: 84–89.
- Voronov, Н. И.; Kavkazskiy otdel Imperatorskogo obshchestva (1869). "Список горских аулов Кубанской и Терской областей" [List of mountain villages of the Kuban and Terek Oblasts]. Сборник статистических сведений о Кавказе [Collection of statistical information about the Caucasus] (in Russian). Vol. 1. Тифлисъ: Tip. Glavnogo Upravleniya Namestnika Kavkazskogo; Tip. Melikova I. K. pp. 41–52 (418–429 as PDF).
- Genko, A. N. (1930). "Из культурного прошлого ингушей" [From the cultural past of the Ingush] (PDF). Записки коллегии востоковедов при Азиатском музее [Notes of the College of Orientalists at the Asian Museum] (PDF) (in Russian). Vol. 5. Leningrad: Izd-vo Akademii nauk SSSR. pp. 681–761.
- Gorepekin, F. I. (2006). Albogachieva, M. S.-G.; Martazanov, A. A (eds.). Труды Фомы Ивановича Горепекина [Works of Foma Ivanovich Gorepekin] (in Russian). SPb.: Ladoga. pp. 1–204. ISBN 5-98635-011-1.
- Dalgat, B. K. (1934). "Родовой быт чеченцев и ингушей" [Tribal life of the Chechens and Ingush]. Izvestiya Ingushkogo Nauchno-issledovatelskogo Instituta (in Russian) (4). Vladikavkaz: Serdalo.
- Dalgat, B. K. (2008). Tishkov, V. A.; Kudelin, A. B.; Gatsak, V. M. (eds.). Родовой быт и обычное право чеченцев и ингушей. Исследование и материалы 1892-1894 гг. [Tribal life and customary law of the Chechens and Ingush. Research and materials of 1892-1894] (in Russian). Moskva: IMLI RAN. pp. 1–382. ISBN 978-5-9208-0307-8.
- Daniyalov, G. D.; Gl. red. vostochnoy literatury, eds. (1968). История Дагестана [History of Dagestan] (PDF) (in Russian). Vol. 3. Moskva: Nauka. pp. 1–425.
- Dakhkilgov, Sh. E.-Kh. (1991). Zyazikov, A. A. (ed.). Происхождение ингушских фамилий [Origin of Ingush surnames] (in Russian). Grozny: Kniga. pp. 1–108. ISBN 5-7666-0423-8.
- Desheriev, Yu. D. (1963). Kuzmenkova, N. T.; Zakharova, S. P. (eds.). Сравнительно-историческая грамматика нахских языков и проблемы происхождения и исторического развития горских кавказских народов [Comparative-Historical Grammar of the Nakh Languages and Problems of the Origin and Historical Development of the Mountain Caucasian Peoples] (in Russian). Grozny: Chech.-Ing. kn. izd-vo. pp. 1–554.
- Dolgieva, M. B.; Kartoev, M. M.; Kodzoev, N. D.; Matiev, T. Kh. (2013). Kodzoev, N. D.; et al. (eds.). История Ингушетии [History of Ingushetia] (4th ed.). Rostov-Na-Donu: Yuzhnyy izdatelsky dom. pp. 1–600. ISBN 978-5-98864-056-1.
- Dubrovin, Н. Ф. (1871). Исторія войны и владычества русскихъ на Кавказѣ [The history of the war and domination of Russians in the Caucasus] (in Russian). Vol. 1: Book 1. SPb.: Tip. Departmenta udelov. pp. 1–656.
- Zeydlits, N. (1878). Терская область. Список населенных мест по сведениям 1874 года [Terek region. List of populated places according to 1874]. Spiski naselennykh mest Kavkazskogo kraya (in Russian) (1st ed.). Tiflis: Kav. stat. kom. pri Gl. upr. namestnika Kavkazskogo. pp. 1–81.
- Zyazikov, M. M. (2004). Традиционная культура ингушей: история и современность [Traditional culture of the Ingush: history and modernity] (in Russian). Rostov-Na-Donu: SKNTs VSh. pp. 1–312. ISBN 5-87872-302-6.
- Ibragimov, Kh. I.; Tishkov, V. A.; Osmaev, A. D.; Ustinova, M. Ya., eds. (2006). Чеченская Республика и чеченцы: история и современность [Chechen Republic and Chechens: history and modernity] (in Russian). Moskva: Nauka. pp. 1–575. ISBN 5-02-034016-2.
- Ibragimov, M.-R. A. (2002). "Чеченцы" [Chechens]. In Arutyunov, S. A.; Osmanov, A. I.; Sergeeva, G. A. (eds.). Народы Дагестана [Peoples of Dagestan] (PDF). Narody i kultyury (in Russian). Moskva: Nauka. pp. 460–472. ISBN 5-02-008808-0.
- "Карта Кавказскаго края с пограничными землями: Составлена при Генеральном Штабе Отдельного Кавказского Корпуса в 1834 году" [Map of the Caucasus region with border lands: Compiled at the General Staff of the Separate Caucasian Corps in 1834]. www.disk.yandex.ru (in Russian). 1834.
- Kartoev, M. M. (2020). Ингушетия в политике Российской империи на Кавказе. XIX век. Сборник документов и материалов [Ingushetia in the policy of the Russian Empire in the Caucasus. 19th century. Collection of documents and materials]. Istoriya Ingushetii: otkrytyy arkhiv (in Russian) (2nd ed.). Rostov-Na-Donu: Yuzhnyy izdatelsky dom. pp. 1–760. ISBN 978-5-98864-060-8.
- Kashkaev, B. O. (1960). "Борьба трудящихся Дагестана против бичераховщины и германо-турецких интервентов" [The struggle of the working people of Dagestan against the Bicherakhovshchina and the German-Turkish interventionists]. Ученые записки [Scholarly notes] (PDF) (in Russian). Vol. 8. Makhachkala: Nauka. pp. 107–132.
- Kovalevsky, P. I. (1914). Народы Кавказа [Peoples of the Caucasus]. Kavkaz (in Russian). Vol. 1. SPb.: Tip. M. I. Akinfieva. pp. 1–346.
- Kodzoev, N. D. (2002). "Глава 5" [Chapter 5]. История ингушского народа [History of the Ingush people] (in Russian). Magas: Serdalo. Archived from the original on 2019-07-23.
- Kodzoev, N. D. (2020). О 'добровольном вхождении' Ингушетии в состав Российской империи [On the 'voluntary entry' of Ingushetia into the Russian Empire] (in Russian). Nazran: Kep. pp. 1–64.
- Kodzoev, N. D.; Kieva, Z. Kh. (2021). Nakostkhoev, Kh. A.; Khayrova, P. P. (eds.). Ономастикон Ингушетии [Onomasticon of Ingushetia] (in Russian). Moskva: TPK "Tsentroblank". pp. 1–121. ISBN 978-5-91303-022-1.
- Kostoev, B. U.; Pliev, M.-R. A. (1990). Kostoev, A. U. (ed.). Второй съезд ингушского народа [Second Congress of the Ingush people] (in Russian). Grozny: Kniga. pp. 1–235. ISBN 5-7666-0396-7.
- Krupnov, E. I. (1971). Средневековая Ингушетия [Medieval Ingushetia] (in Russian). Moskva: Nauka. pp. 1–211.
- Kuznetsov, V. A. (2004). Kuchiev, A. G. (ed.). Введение в кавказоведение (историко-этнологические очерки народов Северного Кавказа) [Introduction to Caucasian Studies (Historical and Ethnological Essays on the Peoples of the North Caucasus)] (in Russian). Vladikavkaz: IPP im. V. A. Gassieva. pp. 1–184. ISBN 5-7534-0700-5.
- Kurkiev, A. S. (2005). Murgustov, M. S.; Akhrieva, M. S.; Gagiev, K. A.; Kurkieva, S. Kh.; Sultygova, Z. N. (eds.). Ингушско-русский словарь: 11142 слова [Ingush-Russian dictionary: 11142 words] (in Russian). Magas: Serdalo. pp. 1–545. ISBN 5-94452-054-X.
- Malsagov, Z. K. (1963). Ozdoeva, F. G. (ed.). Грамматика ингушского языка [Grammar of the Ingush language] (in Ingush and Russian). Vol. 5 (2nd ed.). Grozny: Chech.-Ing. kn. izd-vo. pp. 1–164.
- Martirosian, G. K. (1928). Нагорная Ингушия [Upland Ingushiya] (in Russian). Vladikavkaz: Gostip. I. A. O. pp. 1–153.
- Nataev, S. A. (2015). "К вопросу об этносоциальной структуре Чечни в XVIII-XIX вв.(по данным этнонимики и фольклора чеченцев)" [To the question of the ethno-social structure of Chechnya in the XVIII-XIX centuries (according to the ethnonymy and folklore of the Chechens)]. Teoriya I Praktika Obshchestvennogo Razvitiya (in Russian) (21). Khors: 170–173. eISSN 2072-7623. ISSN 1815-4964.
- Obshcenatsionalnaya Komissiya po rassmotreniyu voprosov, szyazannykh s oprdeleniem territorii i granits Ingushetii (2021). Vsemirny kongress ingushkogo naroda (ed.). Доклад о границах и территории Ингушетии (общие положения) [Report on the borders and territory of Ingushetia (general provisions)] (archival documents, maps, illustrations) (in Russian). Nazran. pp. 1–175.
- Parova, L. M. (2005). "Кисты" [Kists]. In Y. A. Zhdanov (ed.). Энциклопедия культур народов Юга России [Encyclopedia of cultures of the peoples of the South of Russia]. Vol. I. Rostov-on-Don: СКНЦ ВШ. p. 71. ISBN 5-87872-089-2.
- Robakidze, А. И., ed. (1968). Кавказский этнографический сборник. Очерки этнографии Горной Ингушетии [Caucasian ethnographic collection. Essays on the ethnography of Mountainous Ingushetia] (in Russian). Vol. 2. Tbilisi: Mentsiereba. pp. 1–333.
- Terskiy Oblastnoy Statisticheskiy Komitet (1885). Blagoveshchenskiy, N. A. (ed.). Список населенных мест Терской области: По сведениям к 1-му января 1883 года [List of populated areas of the Terek region: According to information on January 1st of 1883] (in Russian). Vladikavkaz: Tip. Tersk. Obl. Pravl. pp. 1–78.
- Terskiy Oblastnoy Statisticheskiy Komitet (1890). Maksimov, E. (ed.). Сунженский отдел [Sunzhensky Otdel]. Statisticheskiy tablitsy naselennykh mest Terskoy oblasti (in Russian). Vol. 1: Issue 1. Vladikavkaz: Tip. Tersk. Obl. Pravl. pp. 1–85.
- Terskiy Oblastnoy Statisticheskiy Komitet (1915). Gortinsky, S. P. (ed.). Список населенных мест Терской области: (По данным к 1-му июля 1914 года) [List of populated places in the Terek region: (as of July 1, 1914)] (in Russian). Vladikavkaz: Elektro-pechatnya Tip. Tersk. Obl. Pravl. pp. 2, 15–459.
