= Fappi =

Historical region in Ingushetia

Fappi (Ingush: Фаьппи, romanized: Fäppi) or Fappi mokhk (Ingush: Фаьппи мохк, romanized: Fäppi mokhk, lit. 'Country of Feappins'), (Note: Other variants of the toponym include: Babiy, Vappi and Vabua (Vappua).) exonym: Kistetia, is a historical region in Ingushetia. Fappi is the territory of historical settlement of the Feappii society.

== Geography ==
Suleymanov gave the following boundaries of the historical region: in the west with the Dzherakhs, in the south with Khevsureti, in the east with the Khamkhins and the Tsorins. To the north, the region extended toward the plains. The territory of the Feappii covered a large part of the Armkhi Gorge. According to A. N. Genko, the ethnonym was historically associated with territories west of the Lomeka River (an ancient name for the Terek River), including areas within the present-day Republic of North Ossetia.

== History ==
The historical area of Fappi Mokhk was mentioned as 'Kistetia', as well as 'Kistia' or 'Kistinia'. The Georgian prince, historian, and geographer of the 18th century, Prince Vakhushti of Kartli, localised Kistetia along the gorge of the Armkhi River (historically 'Kistinka'), in mountainous Ingushetia.

According to the German researcher J. A. Güldenstädt, who visited the Caucasus in 1770-1773, the Feappii, along with the other Ingush societies, was subject to either the Oksay or Kabardian princes, while in ancient times these territories had been subject to Georgia. According to ethnographer Chakh Akhriev, Fappi Mokhk (Kistetia) was traditionally ruled by members of the Yandiev and Mamilov families, branches of the Oartskhoy clan of Erzi.

== Settlements ==
The center of the society was the fortified village (aul) Erzi.

== Bibliography ==
- Волкова, Н. Г. (1977). "Бацбийцы Грузии (Этнографические заметки)" [Batsbi of Georgia (Ethnographical notes)] (PDF). Советская Этнография (in Russian) (2). Москва: Наука: 84–89.
- Жданов, Ю. А., ed. (2005). Энциклопедия культур народов Юга России. Народы Юга России [Encyclopedia of cultures of the peoples of the South of Russia. Peoples of the South of Russia] (in Russian). Vol. 1. Ростов-на-Дону: СКНЦ ВШ. pp. 1–244. ISBN 5-87872-089-2.
- Дешериев, Ю. Д. [in Russian] (1963). Кузьменкова, Н. Т.; Захарова, С. П. (eds.). Сравнительно-историческая грамматика нахских языков и проблемы происхождения и исторического развития горских кавказских народов [Comparative-Historical Grammar of the Nakh Languages and Problems of the Origin and Historical Development of the Mountain Caucasian Peoples] (in Russian). Грозный: Чечено-Ингушское книжное издательство. pp. 1–554.
- Волкова, Н. Г. (1974). Гарданов, В. К. (ed.). Этнический состав населения Северного Кавказа в XVIII — начале XX века [Ethnic composition of the population of the North Caucasus in the 18th - early 20th centuries] (in Russian). Москва: Наука. pp. 1–276.
- Робакидзе, А. И., ed. (1968). Кавказский этнографический сборник. Очерки этнографии Горной Ингушетии [Caucasian ethnographic collection. Essays on the ethnography of Mountainous Ingushetia] (in Russian). Vol. 2. Тбилиси: Мецниереба. pp. 1–333.
- Волкова, Н. Г. (1973). Лавров, Л. И. (ed.). Этнонимы и племенные названия Северного Кавказа [Ethnonyms and tribal names of the North Caucasus] (in Russian). Москва: Наука. pp. 1–210.
- Броневский, С. М. (1823). "Кисты (глава третья)" [Kists (chapter three)]. Новейшие географические и исторические известия о Кавказе (часть вторая) [The latest geographical and historical news about the Caucasus (part two)] (PDF) (in Russian). Москва: Типография С. Селивановского. pp. 151–186.
- "Кавказский край" [Caucasian territory]. Военно-статистическое обозрение Российской империи: издаваемое по высочайшему повелению при 1-м отделении Департамента Генерального штаба [Military Statistical Review of the Russian Empire: published by the highest command at the 1st branch of the Department of the General Staff] (in Russian). Vol. 16. Part 1. СПб.: Типография Департамента Генерального штаба. 1851. pp. 1–274.
- Благовещенский, Николай Александрович, ed. (1885). Список населенных мест Терской области: По сведениям к 1 янв. 1883 г. [List of populated places in the Terek region: According to information as of 1 Jan. 1883] (in Russian). Владикавказ: Типография Терского Областного Правления. pp. 1–78.
- Волконский, Н. А. (1886). "Война на Восточном Кавказе с 1824 по 1834 годы в связи с мюридизмом" [War in the Eastern Caucasus from 1824 to 1834 in connection with Muridism]. Кавказский сборник [Caucasian collection] (in Russian). Vol. 10. Тифлис. pp. 1–607.
- Пантюхов, И. И. (1901). Ингуши. Антропологический очерк [Ingush. An anthropological essay] (in Russian). Тифлис: Типография К. П. Козловского. Головинский пр.. д. № 12. pp. 1–35.
- Ковалевский, П. И. (1914). Народы Кавказа [Peoples of the Caucasus] (in Russian). Санкт-Петербург: Типография М. И. Акинфиев. pp. 1–346.
- Горепекин, Ф. И. (2006). "Краткие сведения о народе «ингуши»" [Brief information about the people "Ingush"]. In Албогачиева, М.С-Г.; Мартазанов, А. А (eds.). Труды Фомы Ивановича Горепекина [Works of Foma Ivanovich Gorepekin] (in Russian). СПб.: Ладога. pp. 1–204. ISBN 5-98635-011-1.
- Мартиросиан, Г. К. (1928). Нагорная Ингушия [Upland Ingushiya] (in Russian). Владикавказ: Государственная типография Автономной Области Ингушии. pp. 1–153.
- Крупнов, Е. И. (1971). Средневековая Ингушетия [Medieval Ingushetia] (in Russian). Москва: Наука. pp. 1–211.
- Павлова, О. С. (2012). Ингушский этнос на современном этапе: черты социально-психологического портрета [The Ingush ethnos at the present stage: features of the socio-psychological portrait] (in Russian). Москва: Форум. pp. 1–383. ISBN 9785911346652. OCLC 798995782.
- Сулейманов, А. С. (1978). Шайхиев, А. Х. (ed.). Часть II: Горная Ингушетия (юго-запад) и Чечня (центр и юго-восток) [Part 2: Mountainous Ingushetia (southwest) and Chechnya (center and southeast)]. Топонимия Чечено-Ингушетии: в IV частях (1976-1985 гг.) (in Russian). Грозный: Чечено-Ингушское Книжное Издательство. pp. 1–233.
- Гюльденштедт, Иоганн Антон (2002). "VI. Провинция Кистия, или Кистетия" [VI. Province of Kistia, or Kistetia]. In Карпов, Ю. Ю. (ed.). Путешествие по Кавказу в 1770-1773 гг. [Journey through the Caucasus in 1770-1773.] (in Russian). Translated by Шафроновской, Т. К. Санкт-Петербург: Петербургское Востоковедение. pp. 238–243. ISBN 5-85803-213-3.
- Дзарахова, З. М. (2016). О ГОРНОМ СЕЛЕНИИ ФАЛХАН (полевые этнографические материалы). № No2 [ABOUT THE MOUNTAIN VILLAGE OF FALKHAN (field ethnographic materials). No.2.] (in Russian). Магас: ВЕСТНИК Ингушского научно-исследовательского института гуманитарных науким. Ч.Э. Ахриева.
