= Falkhan =

Rural locality in Ingushetia

Falkhan Фалхан
- Aul

Other transcription(s)
  - Ingush: Фалхане
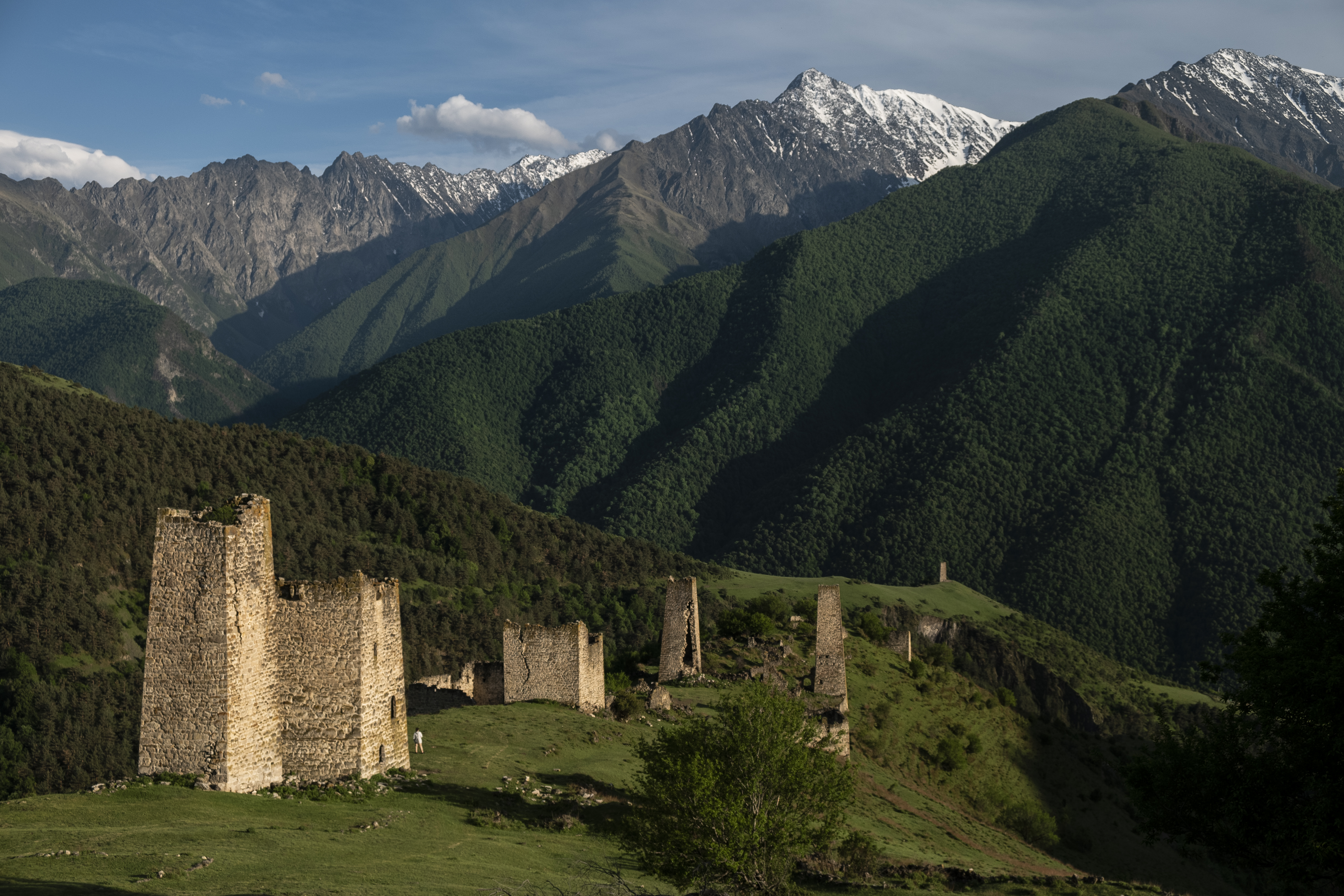
- Towers of Falkhan
- Interactive map of Falkhan
- Location of Falkhan Falkhan (Republic of Ingushetia)
- Coordinates: 42°49′16″N 44°44′07″E
- Country: Russia
- Federal subject: Ingushetia
- Elevation: 1,432 m (4,698 ft)

Population (2010 Census)
  - Total: 0
  - Estimate (2021): 0 )

Administrative status
  - Subordinated to: Dzheyrakhsky District
- Time zone: UTC+3 (MSK)
- Postal code: 386430
- OKTMO ID: 26620430121

Falkhan (Russian and Ingush: Фалхан) is a rural locality (aul) in the Dzheyrakhsky District of Ingushetia, Russia. It is part of the Lyazhgi rural settlement.

Founded around the 16–17th centuries, Falkhan was considered one of the historical cradles of Ingush people. The village once consisted of three Ingush battle towers, one semi-combat tower and twelve residential towers. The towers were five storeys high, with flat roofs and high parapets.

== Name ==
The toponym is of ancient origin. It can be broken into three parts: Falkha-n-e, where "-n" and "-e/ye" are suffixes of the Ingush language. The ethnonym Falkhankhoy (a teip) derives its name from Falkhan. According to Akhmad Suleymanov, the name of the village is associated with the Ingush word fala (фала), meaning "free".

== Geography ==
Falkhan is located in the Kistin Gorge, on the slope of the spurs of Mount Myat-Loam (Table Mountain). It lies south of the village of Metskhal and southwest of village of Khast-Mokie. Several pastures and meadows are located nearby, including Tielta, Velkh Tsona, Dal-Tsonashkie, Mekhanchie, and others. In addition, there are old places of worship such as Myat-Selash, Ashp-Koag, Gerg-Argie, and Motskharashkie.

== History ==
=== Background ===
Falkhan, along with the villages of Targim, Egikal, Khamkhi, Erzi, Metskhal, Goust, and Furtoug, is considered part of the historical cradle of the Ingush people. According to ethnographer Bashir Dalgat, all of the villages and settlements (more than 20) of the Fyappin Society originate from Falkhan. The village population was primarily composed of Dzarakhovs, as well as Adzhievs, Bersanovs, Umarovs, and Kotievs.

According to legend, the village was founded by Ferkhast and his three sons who left the village of Tyarsh. The territory of the village originally belonged to the Ghamneaqan tribe (Ingush: ГIамнаькъан), which made it difficult for others to settle there. According to the same legend, the Ghamneaqan were later killed by the inhabitants of Falkhan.

The inhabitants engaged in the manufacture of items from horn, clay, bone, and wood, as well as archery weapons. Cloth production was developed, and there were deposits of sulphur and saltpetre, along with ores of copper, sulphur pyrites, brown iron ore, lead, zinc, and ochre.

The complex has attracted significant scholarly interest and have been studied by prominent Russian and Soviet archaeologists. Thus, it has been studied by archeologists such as Leonid Semyonov, Ivan Shcheblykin, Evgeny Krupnov, Aleksey Robakidze, Vladimir Markovin, and Jabrail Chakhkiev.

=== Russian rule ===
In 1811–1812, there were 30 households in Falkhan. By the 1830s, the majority of Falkhan's inhabitants had migrated to the villages of Dzheyrakh-Yurt, Sholkhi, Ghalghai Yurt, and the Fortress of Vladikavkaz, located in the Ingush plain. By the mid-19th century, the Dzarakhovs and Kotievs of Falkhan had also migrated to the village of Angusht. During this period, a mosque and a madrassa were built opposite the Solar Necropolis of Falkhan, with the help of the Andi theologian Murdal-Hajji. Dibr-Mulla served as the imam of the mosque at Murdal-Hajji’s request. In 1886, there were 22 families living in Falkhan: ten Dzarakhov families, three Kotiev families, three Bersanov families, and two Adzhiev families.

On 23 February 1944, the inhabitants of Falkhan were deported during the forced relocation of the Chechens and Ingush to the Kazakh SSR and Kirghiz SSR. Those who returned from exile in 1957 were denied the right to resettle in the village. The towers and crypts of Falkhan were repeatedly explored in the 1930s and 1970s, with the results published in various scientific works.

=== Modern ===
Today, the village and its historical sites are included in the Dzheyrakh-Assa Museum-Reserve, established in 1988. The archaeological monuments of mountainous Ingushetia, including Falkhan, continue to attract significant scholarly attention.

== Demographics ==
Historical population
Year	Pop.	±%
1874	71	—
1883	143	+101.4%
1890	115	−19.6%
1914	87	−24.3%
1926	20	−77.0%
Source: 1874 census: Terksaya oblast. Spisok naselennykh mest po svedeniyam 1874 goda 1878, p. 23; 1883 census: Spisok naselennykh mest Terskoy oblasti: Po svedeniyam k 1-mu yanvarya 1883 goda 1885, p. 16; 1890 census: Sunzhenskiy otdel 1890, p. 43; 1914 census: Spisok naselennykh mest Terskoy oblasti: (Po Dannyn k 1-mu iyulya 1914 goda 1915, p. 335; 1926 census: Poselennye itogi perepisi 1926 godu Po Severo-Kavkazskomu krayu 1929, p. 409

== Bibliography ==
- Chakhkiev, Djabrail (2003). Aliroev, I. A. (ed.). Древности горной Ингушетии [Antiquities of mountainous Ingushetia] (in Russian). Vol. 1. Minvody: Kavkazskaya zdravnitsa. pp. 1–144.
- Dakhkilgov, I. A. (1978). "Народная этимология некоторых топонимов Чечено-Ингушетии (По легендам и преданиям)" [Folk etymology of some toponyms of Checheno-Ingushetia (According to legends and traditions)]. In Aliroev, I. Yu.; Selimov, A. A.; Shekurova, V. G.; Bibulatov, N. S. (eds.). Вопросы отраслевой лексики [Questions of industry vocabulary] (in Russian). Grozny: Chech.-Ing. kn. izd-vo. pp. 35–42.
- Dzarakhova, Z. M.-T. (2016). "О горном селении Фалхан (полевые этнографические материалы)" [About the mountain village of Falkhan (field ethnographic materials)]. Vestnik Ingushkogo Nauchno-issledovatelskogo Instituta Gumanitarnykh Nauk Im. Ch. E. Akhrieva (in Russian) (2). Magas: Ingushkiy nauchno-issledovatelsky institut gumanitarnykh nauk im. Ch. E. Akhrieva: 22–29.
- Dzarakhova, Z. M.-T. (2020-10-06). "Об ингушах и Ингушетии: Башир Керимович Далгат — просветитель, этнограф, антрополог, ученый, общественный деятель" [About the Ingush and Ingushetia: Bashir Kerimovich Dalgat - educator, ethnographer, anthropologist, scientist, public figure]. Ingushetia (in Russian). GAU redaktsiya gazety "Ingushetia".
- Dzarakhova, Z. M.-T. (2021-03-16). "Музыкальный фольклор ингушей: Многообразие жанров песенной культуры ингушского народа" [Musical folklore of the Ingush: The variety of genres of song culture of the Ingush people]. Ingushetia (in Russian). GAU redaktsiya gazety "Ingushetia".
- Kharsieva, L. (2022-06-21). "Трагическая и героическая дата: 81 год назад началась ВОВ: воины-ингуши на передовой" [Tragic and heroic date: 81 years ago the Second World War began: Ingush warriors on the front line]. Ingushetia (in Russian). GAU redaktsiya gazety "Ingushetia".
- Kobychev, V. P. (1982). Gardanov, V. K. (ed.). Поселения и жилище народов Северного Кавказа в XIX-XXвв. [Settlements and housing of the peoples of the North Caucasus in the 19th-20th centuries] (in Russian). Moskva: Nauka. pp. 1–191.
- Kurkiev, A. S. (1979). Основные вопросы лексикологии ингушского языка [The main questions of the lexicology of the Ingush language] (in Russian). Grozny: Chech.-Ing. kn. izd-vo. pp. 1–254.
- Kuznetsov, V. A. (2004). Kuchiev, A. G. (ed.). Введение в кавказоведение (историко-этнологические очерки народов Северного Кавказа) [Introduction to Caucasian Studies (Historical and Ethnological Essays on the Peoples of the North Caucasus)] (in Russian). Vladikavkaz: IPP im. V. A. Gassieva. pp. 1–184. ISBN 5-7534-0700-5.
- Krupnov, E. I. (1971). Средневековая Ингушетия [Medieval Ingushetia] (in Russian). Moskva: Nauka. pp. 1–211.
- Мальсагов, З. К. (1963). Оздоева, Ф. (ed.). Грамматика ингушского языка [Grammar of the Ingush language] (in Ingush and Russian). Vol. 5 (2nd ed.). Грозный: Чечено-Ингушское Книжное Издательство. pp. 1–164.
- Terskiy Oblastnoy Statisticheskiy Komitet (1885). Blagoveshchenskiy, N. A. (ed.). Список населенных мест Терской области: По сведениям к 1-му января 1883 года [List of populated areas of the Terek region: According to information on January 1st of 1883] (in Russian). Vladikavkaz: Tip. Terskogo Oblastnogo Pravleniya. pp. 1–78.
- Terskiy Oblastnoy Statisticheskiy Komitet (1890). Maksimov, E. (ed.). Сунженский отдел [Sunzhensky Otdel]. Statisticheskiy tablitsy naselennykh mest Terskoy oblasti (in Russian). Vol. 1: Issue 1. Vladikavkaz: Tip. Terskogo Oblastnogo Pravleniya. pp. 1–85.
- Terskiy Oblastnoy Statisticheskiy Komitet (1915). Gortinsky, S. P. (ed.). Список населенных местт Терской области: (По данным к 1-му июля 1914 года) [List of populated places in the Terek region: (as of July 1, 1914)] (in Russian). Vladikavkaz: Elektro-pechatnya Tip. Tersk. Obl. Pravl. pp. 2, 15–459.
- Severo-Kavkazskoe kravoe statisticheskoe upravlenie (1929). Поселенные итоги переписи 1926 года по Северо-Кавказскому краю [Settled results of the 1926 census in the North Caucasus region] (in Russian). Rostov-Na-Donu: Otdel perepisi. pp. 1–544.
- Suleymanov, A. S. (1978). Shaykhiev, A. Kh. (ed.). Топонимия Чечено-Ингушетии. Часть 2. Горная Ингушетия (юго-запад) и Чечня (центр и юго-восток) [Toponymy of Checheno-Ingushetia. Part 2. Mountainous Ingushetia (southwest) and Chechnya (center and southeast)] (in Russian). Grozny: Chech.-Ing. kn. izd-vo. pp. 1–233.
- Dalgat, B. K. (2008). Tishkov, V. A.; Kudelin, A. B.; Gatsak, V. M. (eds.). Родовой быт и обычное право чеченцев и ингушей. Исследование и материалы 1892-1894 гг. [Tribal life and customary law of the Chechens and Ingush. Research and materials of 1892-1894] (in Russian). Moskva: IMLI RAN. pp. 1–382. ISBN 978-5-9208-0307-8.
- "Закон Республики Ингушетия от 23 февраля 2009 года № 5-рз "Об установлении границ муниципальных образований Республики Ингушетия и наделении их статусом сельского, городского поселения, муниципального района и городского округа"" [Law of the Republic of Ingushetia dated February 23, 2009 No. 5–section "On establishing the boundaries of municipalities of the Republic of Ingushetia and granting them the status of rural, urban settlements, municipal districts and urban districts"]. docs.cntd.ru (in Russian). 2009. Archived from the original on 2018-01-28.
- Zeydlits, N. (1878). Терская область. Список населенных мест по сведениям 1874 года [Terek region. List of populated places according to 1874]. Spiski naselennykh mest Kavkazskogo kraya (in Russian) (1st ed.). Tiflis: Kav. stat. kom. pri Gl. upr. namestnika Kavkazskogo. pp. 1–81.
