= Bats people =

Nakh-speaking ethnographic group, living in Georgia

Batsbi
ბაცბი
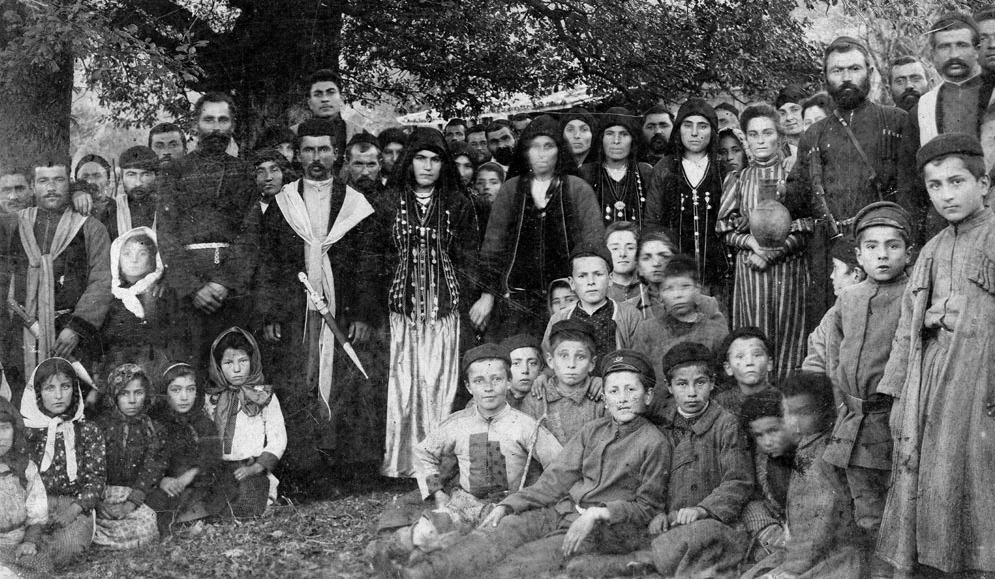
- A late nineteenth-century Batsbur wedding in the village of Zemo Alvani (eastern Georgia).

Total population
- c. 3,000

Regions with significant populations
- Georgia (Tusheti and Kakheti)

Languages
- Bats, Georgian

Religion
- Christianity (Georgian Orthodox)

The Bats people or the Batsbi (Note: Batsbi: pl. бацби, romanized: batsbi, sing. бацав, romanized: batsav; Georgian: pl. ბაცბები, romanized: batsbebi, sing. ბაცბი, romanized: batsbi; Ingush: pl. фаьппи-бацой, бацой, romanized: fäppi-batsoy, batsoy, sing. бацо, romanized: batso.) are Nakh-speaking Tushetians in the country of Georgia. They are also known as the Ts'ova-Tush (წოვათუშები) after the Ts'ova Gorge in the historic Georgian mountain region of Tusheti. The group should not be confused with the neighbouring Kists – also a Nakh-speaking people who live in the nearby Pankisi Gorge.

== Language and customs ==
Part of the community still retains its own Bats language (ბაცბყრ ნიტტ batsbur mott), a Nakh-Dagestanian language which has adopted many Georgian loanwords and grammatical patterns through centuries of language contact. Batsbi is mutually unintelligible with the two other Nakh languages, Chechen and Ingush. As Professor Johanna Nichols put it, "[the Batsbur] language is related to Chechen and Ingush roughly as Czech is related to Russian [and the Batsbi do] not belong to vai naakh nor their language to vai mott, though any speaker of Chechen or Ingush can immediately tell that the language is closely related and can understand some phrases of it. The Batsbi have not traditionally followed Vainakh customs or law, and they consider themselves Georgians." Batsbur is not usually used in writing and the Batsbi have used Georgian as a written language and language of trade for centuries.

Georgian ethnographer Sergi Makalatia wrote in his study of Tusheti about the Tsova-Tush language (Batsbur):

"The Tsova-Tushs speak the Tsova language. By origin, their language is Galgai and is related to the Kistin. This language has, however, borrowed many words from Georgian; the Tsova-Tush speak it both at home and among each other. Everybody knows the Tsova language. It is shameful not to speak it. Children start speaking Tsova-Tush and learn Georgian later."

John F. Baddeley also considered the origins of the Tsova-Tush language as a dialect of the Ingush.

Nowadays, all Batsbi speak Georgian (usually with a Tushetian or Kakhetian accent). Only a handful of ethnic Batsbi speak Batsbur on a daily basis.

The Batsbi have retained only a few individual cultural traits, and their customs and traditions now resemble those of other Eastern Georgian mountaineers, particularly those of the Tush. There are also deeper pagan-religious links between the Tush and the neighbouring Khevsur.

== Origins ==
According to most authors, Batsbi are descended from the Ingush. (Note: Эристов 1854, p. 1; Эристов 1855, p. 81; Бакрадзе 1875, p. 89; Зиссерман 1879, p. 236; Маруашвили 1938, p. 18; Grigolia 1939, p. 7; Allen 2017) According to Sir Richard Phillips and E. N. Kusheva, the Batsbi are an Ingush tribe. The origin of the Tsova-Tushins from the Ingush (Galgai) was also acknowledged by the first Tsova-Tushino writer I. Tsiskarov. The data of the Ingush and Batsbi folk legends also testify that the Batsbi came from the area of Vabua (Fappi) in mountainous Ingushetia. According to some information, the resettlement of a part of the Ingush-Fyappins to Tusheti occurred at the end of the 16th century or at the beginning of the 17th century.

== Tsovata and migration to Kakheti ==
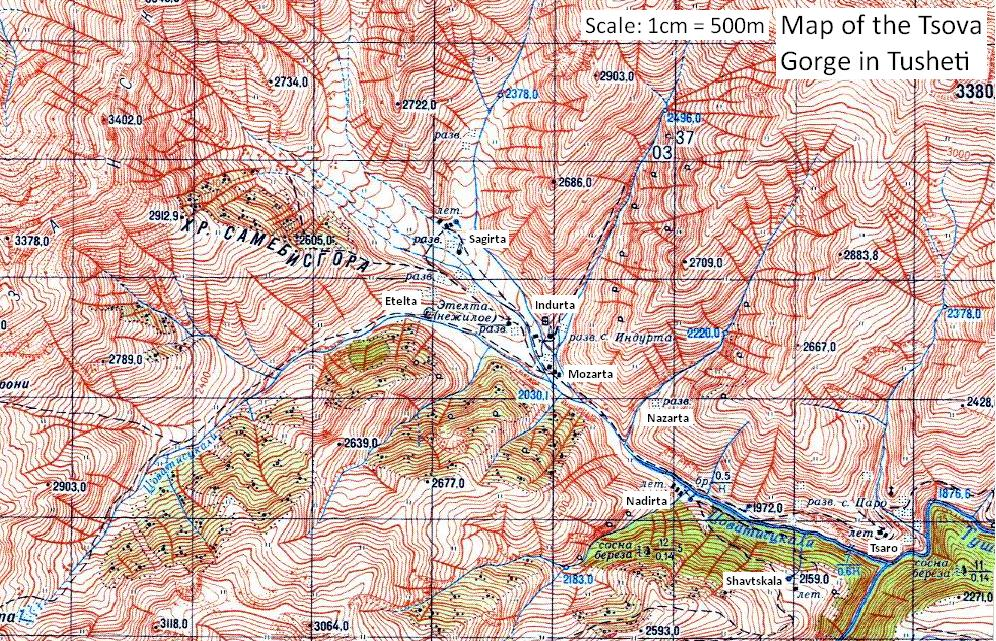
Map of the Tsova Gorge ("Tsovata") in Tusheti

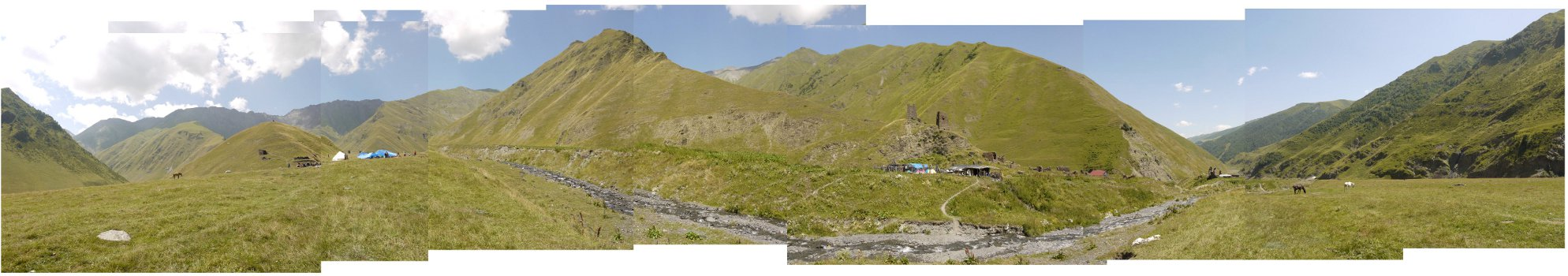
A panorama of Tsovata taken during the Bats people's annual summer festival (dadaloba) in 2010. The small square stone building half-way up the hill on the left is the shrine of "k'en [old] sameb [Trinity, from the Georgian sameba]"; the ruined village with two stone towers just right of centre is Indurta, historically the Bats people's main settlement

The Batsbi's villages in the Ts'ova Gorge (Tsovata) were Ts'aro, Shavts'qala, Nazarta, Nadirta, Mozarta, Indurta, Sagirta and Etelta. Each was inhabited by one or several extended families who believed they shared a common ancestor. In the early nineteenth century, following the destruction of two of their villages by landslides and an outbreak of the plague, the Batsbi abandoned their eight villages in the Ts'ova Gorge in western Tusheti and began to migrate down to the lowlands on the left bank of the Alazani river in western Kakheti.

A significant proportion of the village's women work in Europe and in America, sending money home to the village. Many men still work as shepherds or cowherds, most of them wintering the animals in the Shiraki lowlands (south-eastern Georgia, on the border with neighbouring Azerbaijan) and then taking them up to summer pastures in Tusheti (a two- to three-week journey).

According to a study written and published by Professor Roland Topchishvili as part of the University of Frankfurt's ECLING project, the Batsbi only lived in temporary dwellings around Alvani in winter. In the summer, the men and their families would lead their flocks of sheep up to summer pastures around Tbatana and in Tsovata, returning to Alvani in the autumn.

Professor Johanna Nichols also wrote about the migration of the Batsbi in her article on "The Origin of the Chechen and Ingush":

Batsbi tradition as recorded by Desheriev (1953, 1963) preserves memory of a two-stage descent: first, abandonment of the original highland area in northern Tusheti, settling of villages lower in the mountains, and a period of transhumance plus permanent descents of a few families; then, complete abandonment of the highlands and year-round settlement in the lowlands after a flood destroyed one of the secondary mountain villages in the early nineteenth century. That is, Batsbi lowland outposts were established by a combination of transhumance and individual resettlements, and some time later there was a sizable migration into an established outpost.

Most of the Batsbi currently live in the village of Zemo ("Upper") Alvani in the eastern Georgian province of Kakheti, close to the town of Akhmeta (at the mouth of the Pankisi Gorge). Around half of Zemo Alvani's c.7,000 inhabitants are of Bats origin.

== Historical population figures ==
The first reference to the Batsbi in European ethnographical literature is in the chapter on the Tush and Tusheti in Johannes Güldenstädt's Reisen durch Rußland und im Caucasischen Gebürge ["Travels through Russia and in the Mountains of the Caucasus"], published posthumously by Peter Simon Pallas between 1787 and 1791, although Güldenstädt does not mention them by name, merely pointing out instead that "Kistian and Georgian are spoken equally in the 4 first-named villages [in the Ts'ova Gorge]. Their inhabitants could also more easily be descendants of the Kists than the other Tush."

Figures from the Russian imperial census of 1873 given in Dr. Gustav Radde's Die Chews'uren und ihr Land — ein monographischer Versuch untersucht im Sommer 1876 include the Bats villages in the Ts'ova Gorge (dividing them into the "Indurta" and "Sagirta" communities):

- Indurta community: 191 households, consisting of 413 men and 396 women, totalling 809 souls
- Sagirta community: 153 households (Sagirta proper: 79; Ts'aro: 26; Etelta: 48), consisting of 372 men and 345 women, totalling 717 souls

1873 TOTAL: 344 households, consisting of 785 men and 741 women, in all 1,526 souls.

Dr. Radde adds: "The members of [these two communities] have largely emigrated to the lowlands along the Alazani River, to the east of Akhmeta; they move up in summer to the rich pastures of Tbatana at the southern end of the Massara mountain range (see Itinerary), but still consider Indurta as their property and even leave 2-3 families living there in winter. [The Ts'ova Gorge is situated] By the north-western spring of the Tusheti Alazani River. [...] Together, these two communities made up the Ts'ova community until 1866."

== The decline of the Bats/Tsova-Tush language ==
In 2005, Roland Topchishvili reported that most of the Tsova-Tush population used Georgian as their usual language, and that their previous bilingualism had been declining over the previous 25–30 years.

This coincided with a shift towards ethnic intermarriage: since the 1960s and 1970s, it had become more common for young people to decide on their own relationships, without "interference" from their parents, and the rate of Tsova-Tush men marrying women from other villages had risen. Out of 398 officially registered marriages in Zvemo Alvani, there were 172 (43%) where the husband was Tsova-Tush and the wife was not. Most of these women spoke the Tush dialect of Georgian, while others were Kakhetian, Russian, Kist, Ossethian or Armenian.

Soviet Russian ethnographers had previously found that "problems rise in the languages of small groups when the percentage of their daughters-in-law of different languages exceeds 15-20%". This is because the children of these marriages learn their mothers' language from the beginning and don't pick up the minority language, their fathers', especially when their paternal grandparents don't live with the family. Topchishvili's results aligned with this principle. He further found that:

The fact is that, the most Tsova-Tushs (Batsbis) consider this event as quite normal and only some of them are very sorry for that, especially the old people.

It is also a remarkable fact that in disappearance of the Tsova-Tush (Batsb) language, the role of human factor should be eliminated. The indifference towards the above matter could be explained by their Georgian consciousness. They are the organic part of the Georgian nation and do not differ from other Georgians with their traditions, customs and habits and mentality.

== Bibliography ==
=== English sources ===
- Allen, W.E.D. (5 July 2017). Russian Embassies to the Georgian Kings, 1589–1605: Volumes I and II. Hakluyt Society, Second Series. Abingdon-on-Thames: Routledge. pp. 1–281. ISBN 9781317060390.
- Grigolia, Alexander (1939). Custom and Justice in the Caucasus: The Georgian Highlanders. Pennsylvania: University of Pennsylvania. pp. 1–186.
- Phillips, Sir Richard (1826). A Geographical View of the World: Embracing the Manners, Customs, and Pursuits, of Every Nation : Founded on the Best Authorities. New York: E. Hopkins and W. Reed. pp. 1–452.
- Kolga, M. (2001). "Bats". The Red Book of the Peoples of the Russian Empire. Translated by Ainsaar, S.; Greenbaum, H.; Kaer, K.; Liivak, L.; Mits, K.; Sivonen, E.; Tobber, T.; Verrev, V. NGO Red Book. ISBN 9985936922.
- Topchishvili, Roland (2005). History of Georgian Mountein Regions. Tbilisi: National Library of the Parliament of Georgia.

=== Russian sources ===
- Бакрадзе, Д. (1875). "Кавказъ въ древнихъ памятникахъ христіанства" [Caucasus in the ancient monuments of Christianity]. Записки общества любителей Кавказской археологіи [Notes of the Society of Amateurs of Caucasian Archaeology] (PDF) (in Russian). Тифлисъ: Типографія Главнаго Управленія Намѣстника Кавказскаго. pp. 19–178.
- Волкова, Н. Г. (1968). "Этнические процессы в Грузинской ССР" [Ethnic processes in the Georgian SSR]. In Гарданов, В. К.; Волкова, Н. Г. (eds.). Этнические и культурно-бытовые процессы на Кавказе [Ethnic and cultural processes in the Caucasus] (in Russian). М.: Наука. pp. 3–61.
- Волкова, Н. Г. (1969). "Этнические процессы в Закавказье в XIX-XX вв." [Ethnic processes in Transcaucasia in the 19th-20th century]. In Гарданов, В. К. (ed.). Кавказский этнографический сборник [Caucasian ethnographic collection] (in Russian). М.: Наука. pp. 3–70.
- Волкова, Н. Г. (1974). Гарданов, В. К. (ed.). Этнический состав населения Северного Кавказа в XVIII — начале XX века [Ethnic composition of the population of the North Caucasus in the 18th - early 20th centuries] (in Russian). Москва: Наука. pp. 1–276.
- Зиссерман, А. Л. (1879). Двадцать пять лет на Кавказе (1842-1867) [Twenty-five years in the Caucasus (1842-1867)] (in Russian). Vol. 1: 1842-1851. Санкт-Петербург: Типографія А. С. Суворина. pp. 1–432.
- Кушева, Е. Н. (1963). Народы Северного Кавказа и их связи с Россией (вторая половина XVI — 30-е годы XVII века) [The peoples of the North Caucasus and their relations with Russia (the second half of the 16th - 30s of the 17th century)] (PDF) (in Russian). Москва: Издательство Академии наук СССР. pp. 1–368.
- Макалатия, С. (1983). Тушетия [Tusheti] (in Russian). Тбилиси: Накадули. pp. 1–229.
- Маруашвили, Л. И. (6 June 1938). "Тушетия" [Tusheti]. Вестник знания] (in Russian). No. 1. Ленинград. pp. 16–18 (437–439 as PDF).
- Ольденбург, С. Ф. (1927). Отчет о деятельности Академии наук СССР за 1926 год. Ч. II: Отчет о научных командировках и экспедициях [Report on the activities of the Academy of Sciences of the USSR for 1926. Part II: Report on scientific missions and expeditions] (in Russian). Ленинград: Изд-во АН СССР. pp. 1–268. Archived from the original on 2023-03-02.
- Цискаров, И. Д. (1846). "Картина Тушетии" [Painting of Tusheti]. Кавказ (in Russian). No. 50. Тифлис.
- Цискаров, И. Д. (12 February 1849). "Записки о Тушетии" [Notes about Tusheti]. Кавказ (in Russian). No. 7. Тифлис. pp. 3–4.
- Эристов, Р. (5 June 1854). О Тушино-Пшаво-Хевсурскомъ округѣ [About the Tushino-Pshavo-Khevsursky Districtpublisher=Кавказъ] (in Russian). Тифлисъ.
- Эристов, Р. (1855). "О Тушино-Пшаво-Хевсурскомъ округѣ" [About the Tushino-Pshavo-Khevsursky District]. Записки Кавказскаго отдѣла Императорскаго Русскаго географическаго общества [Notes of the Caucasian Department of the Imperial Russian Geographical Society] (in Russian). Тифлисъ: Типографія Канцеляріи Намѣстника Кавказскаго. pp. 1–.
