= Ruslan Mamilov =

First Ingush sculptor

- Born: Ruslan Izrailovich Mamilov; 7 November 1928; Ordzhonikidze, Ingush Autonomous Oblast, Soviet Union
- Died: 25 February 1992 (aged 63); Grozny, ChRI/Russia (Note: The sovereignty of Chechen Republic of Ichkeria wasn't recognized by Russia. However, at the time Grozny was de facto under the control of Chechen Separatists.)
- Known for: Sculpture

Ruslan Izrailovich Mamilov (Note: Ingush: Мамилнаькъан Исраили воӏ Руслан, romanized: Mamilnäqhan Israili vow Ruslan; Russian: Руслан Израилович Мамилов) (7 November 1928 – 25 February 1992) was the first Ingush sculptor. In 1990, he was awarded the title of the "Honored Artist of the Chechen-Ingush ASSR". He was considered one of the most talented Ingush artists of his time.

== Biography ==
Mamilov was born November 7, 1928, in Ordzhonikidze, Ingush Autonomous Oblast. By ethnicity he was an Ingush.

In 1952, he started working in the studio of People's Artist of the Kirghiz SSR O. M. Manuilova.

In 1954, worked in the Kyrgyz artistic production workshops Frunze.

In 1956, he enrolled in the Almaty Art School at the Sculpture Department, the following year he transferred to the Tbilisi Art School, where he graduated with distinction in 1958.

1958, Work of Art and the foundry workshop at the Art Foundation of Georgia. 1960 - work in the Art Fund of the Kazakh SSR, Alma-Ata. 1962 - work in sculpture studio plant road signs of the Kazakh SSR.

1966 - Sculptor in the workshops of the Art Fund of the Russian Federation Chechen-Ingush branch.

1967 - participation in the Russian youth exhibition "The Soviet South" in Krasnodar.

1968 - completed work on a monumental Monument firefighter who died while fighting fires from the Nazi air raids on Grozny, in the same year became a member of the Union of Artists of the USSR.

1970 - awarded the medal "For Valiant Labor".

1971 - elected Chairman of the Board of the Union of Artists Chechen-Ingush ASSR, in the same year was awarded the medal "for valor".

In 1972 he was elected a delegate to the III Congress of Artists of the RSFSR, in the next year - a delegate of the IV Congress of Artists in 1973 - elected member of the Central Auditing Commission of the Union of Artists of the USSR.

In 1990 he was awarded the title "Honored Artist of the Chechen-Ingush ASSR".

Mamilov was buried on February 25, 1993, in the village of Ezmi Dzheyrakhsky District Ingushetia at the family cemetery Ingush teip Mamilov`s.

== Gallery ==
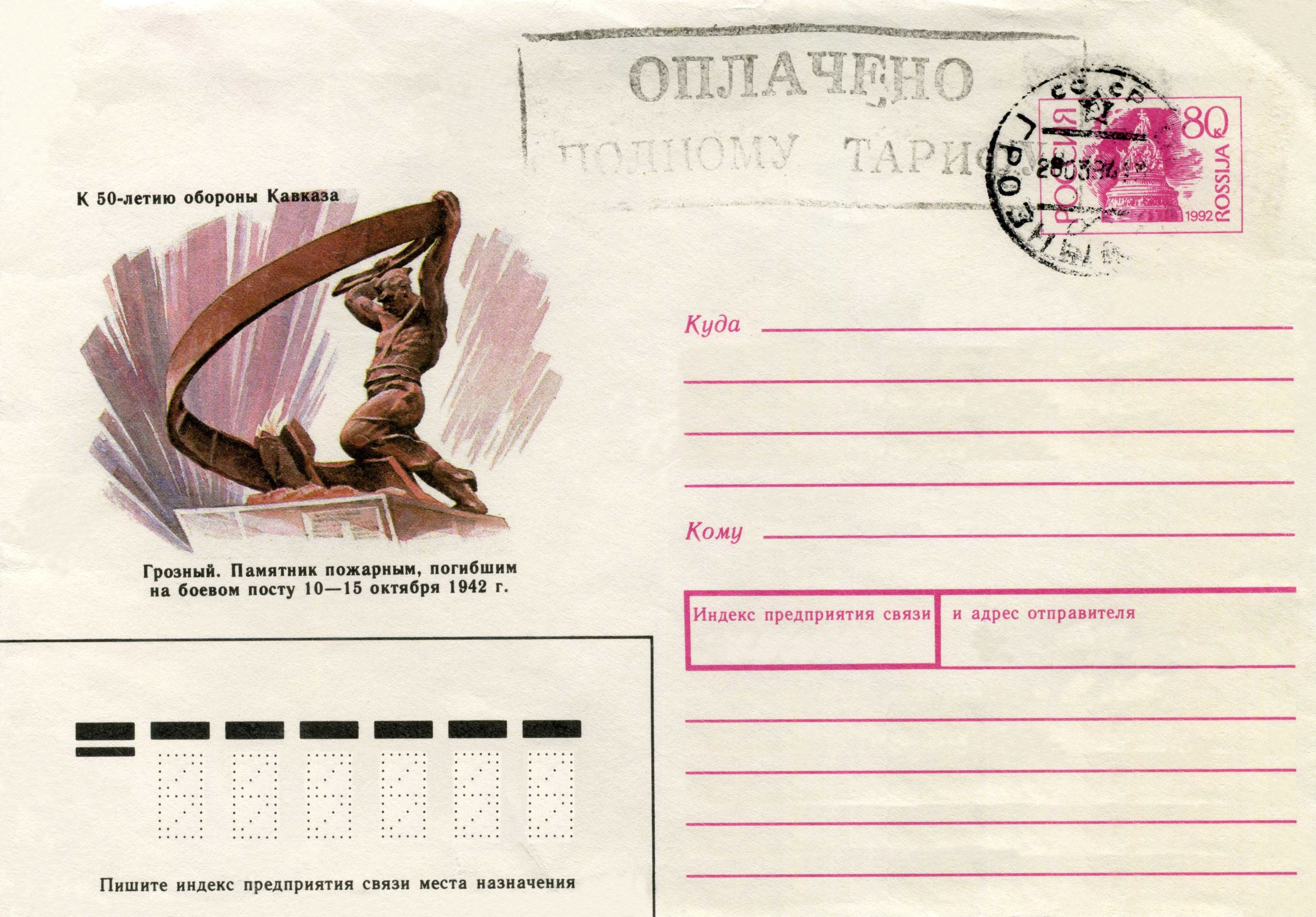
The postal envelope of the Soviet Union with a picture of the monument "Firefighters"

== Posthumous recognition ==
In the village of Dzheirakh of Ingushetia one of the streets was named in honor of Mamilov. There also operates the house-museum of Ruslan Mamilov, opened in 2005.

== Bibliography ==
- Долгиева, М. Б.; Картоев, М. М.; Кодзоев, Н. Д.; Матиев, Т. Х. (2013). Кодзоев, Н. Д. (ed.). История Ингушетии [History of Ingushetia] (4th ed.). Ростов-на-Дону: Южный издательский дом. pp. 1–600. ISBN 978-5-98864-056-1.
- Пресс-служба Государственного музея изобразительных искусств Республики Ингушетия. Мастера изобразительного искусства Ингушетии. Руслан Мамилов [Masters of Fine Arts of Ingushetia. Ruslan Mamilov] (in Russian).
