= Guli, Ingushetia =

Rural locality in Ingushetia

Guli Гули
- Selo

Other transcription(s)
  - Ingush: Хьули
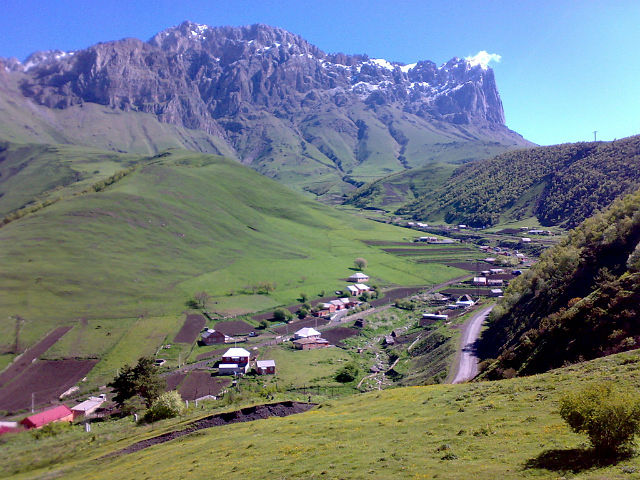
- View of Guli
- Interactive map of Guli
- Location of Guli Guli (Republic of Ingushetia)
- Coordinates: 42°48′39″N 44°47′55″E
- Country: Russia
- Federal subject: Ingushetia
- Elevation: 1,768 m (5,801 ft)

Population (2010 Census)
  - Total: 309
  - Estimate (2021): 475 (+53.7%)

Administrative status
  - Subordinated to: Dzheyrakhsky District
- Time zone: UTC+3 (MSK)
- Postal code: 386430
- OKTMO ID: 26620450101

Guli or Khuli (Ingush: Хьули, romanized: Ẋuli, IPA: [ˈħʷʊlʲɪ]) is a rural locality (a selo) in Dzheyrakhsky District of the Republic of Ingushetia, Russia. It forms the municipality of the rural settlement of Guli as its administrative center. Guli is the ancestral village of Ingush clan (teip) Hulakhoy (Ingush: Хьулахой).

== Geography ==
Guli is located southeast of the district center Dzheyrakh. The nearest settlements: in the northwest - the village of Beyni, in the southwest - the village of Olgeti, in the east - the village of Lyazhgi.

== History ==
Historically, the village of Guli belonged to the Kistin or Fyappiy society. In the 1830s, the village was completely destroyed as a result of punitive expeditions undertaken by the tsarist troops to the mountainous Ingushetia.

In 2016, one of the residential towers of the village was restored by a representative of the family, Savarbek Khadziev. In the same year, the elder of the village, Appaz Lorsovich Iliev, was (in absentia) awarded the Golden Rose statuette for winning the Longevity Without Borders nomination at the Slavic Fairy Tale international festival in Bulgaria. Appaz Iliev at that time was 120 years old.

== Infrastructure ==
The village has a school named "Guli Municipal Primary School".

== Gallery ==
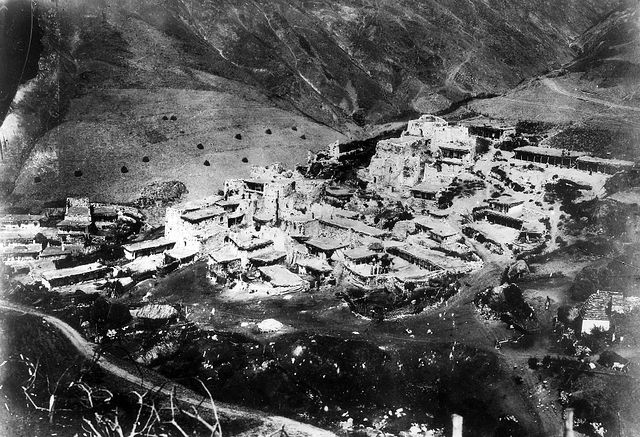
Guli in 1910

== Bibliography ==
- Волкова, Н. Г. (1973). Этнонимы и племенные названия Северного Кавказа [Ethnonyms and tribal names of the North Caucasus] (in Russian). Москва: Наука. pp. 1–210.
- Картоев, М. М. (2020). Ингушетия в политике Российской империи на Кавказе. XIX век. Сборник документов и материалов [Ingushetia in the policy of the Russian Empire in the Caucasus. 19th century. Collection of documents and materials] (in Russian) (2 ed.). Ростов-на-Дону: Южный издательский дом. pp. 1–760. ISBN 978-5-98864-060-8.
- Долгиева, М. Б.; Картоев, М. М.; Кодзоев, Н. Д.; Матиев, Т. Х. (2013). История Ингушетии [History of Ingushetia] (4nd ed.). Ростов-на-Дону: Южный издательский дом. pp. 1–600. ISBN 978-5-98864-056-1.
- Мальсагов, З. К. (1963). Ф. Х. Оздоева (ed.). Грамматика ингушского языка [Grammar of the Ingush language] (in Ingush and Russian). Vol. 5 (2nd ed.). Грозный: Чечено-Ингушское Книжное Издательство. pp. 1–164.
