= Metskhal =

Rural locality in Ingushetia

Metskhal Мецхал
- Aul

Other transcription(s)
  - Ingush: Мецхал
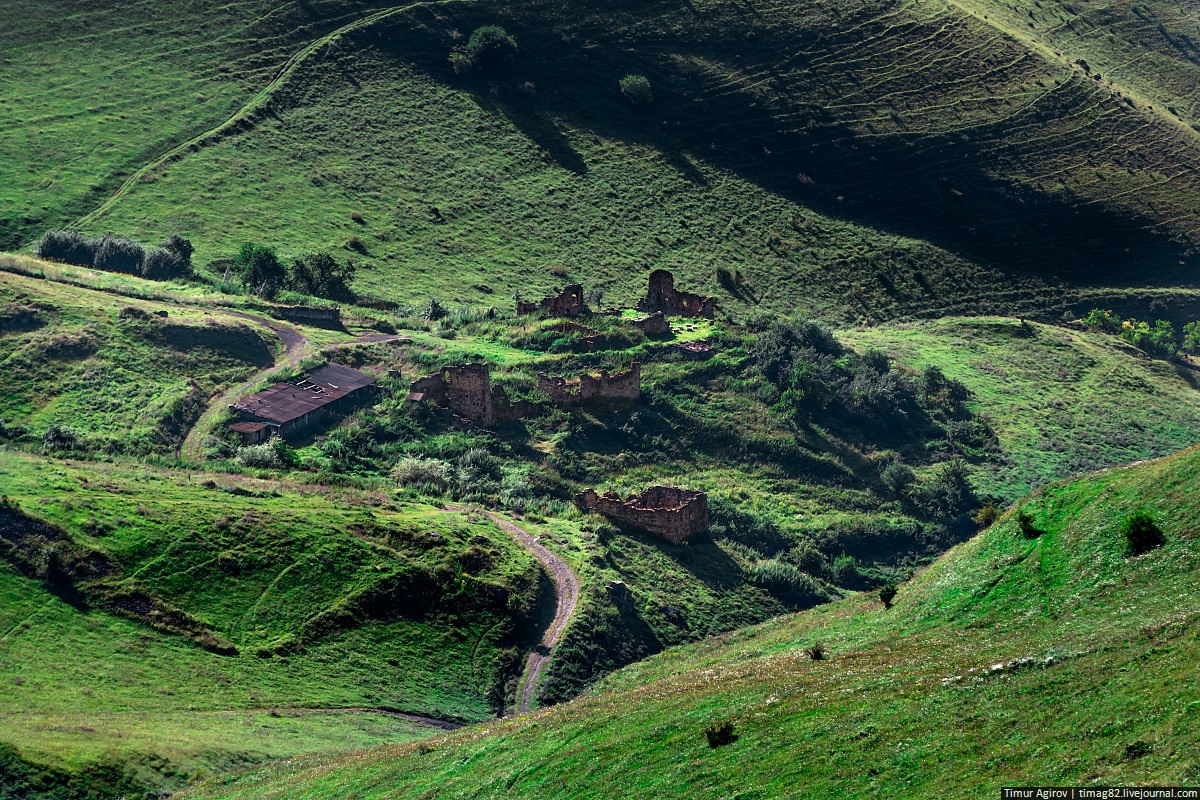
- Ruins of Metskhal
- Interactive map of Metskhal
- Location of Metskhal Metskhal (Republic of Ingushetia)
- Coordinates: 42°49′36″N 44°44′18″E
- Country: Russia
- Federal subject: Ingushetia

Population (2010 Census)
  - Total: 0
  - Estimate (2021): 0 )

Administrative status
  - Subordinated to: Dzheyrakhsky District
- Time zone: UTC+3 (MSK)
- Postal code: 386430
- OKTMO ID: 26620430116

Metskhal (Ingush: Мецхал, romanized: Mecxal, IPA: [ˈmʲet͡sxəɫ]) is an abandoned aul in the Dzheyrakhsky District of Ingushetia. It is part of the rural settlement of Lyazhgi.

== Etymology ==
The name was most likely based on the Ingush word "metskhalg", meaning "swift", which was revered by the Ingush. Metskhal may also have a connection to the name of the ancient Georgian capital, Mtskheta.

== Geography ==
Metskhal is located northeast of the village of Falkhan, on the spur of Mount Myat-Loam.

== History ==
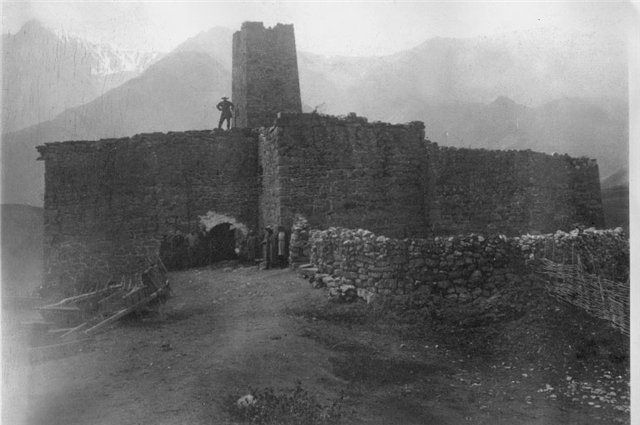
Metskhal in 1903

On January 8, 1811, the foremen of 13 (Fyappin) villages, including Metskhal, signed an act of oath to the Empire Russian Empire. However, it is worth noting that even after these oaths by individual Ingush societies or clans, the nature of Russian–Ingush relations remained largely unchanged. In fact, both sides regarded these oaths as the conclusion of union treaties.

According to the List of Populated Areas of the Military-Ossetian Okrug from 1859, Metskhal had 13 households and was part of the Military-Ossetian Okrug within the Kistin society.

In Metskhal there were once separate but closely interconnected tower castle complexes belonging to the Tochievs, Kotievs, Dzhabagievs, and Kusievs. Some scholars argue that this tower complex functioned as the administrative, cultural, and economic centre of the late medieval Fyappin/Metskhalin society (in the 19th century).

Metalworking was highly developed among the Ingush from ancient times. Local artisans skilfully combined various metalworking techniques, including graining, blackening, gilding, and inlay with multicoloured inserts. The most renowned jewellery-making centres among the Ingush included Metskhal and others.

Christianity occupied a significant place in the religious history of the region. It first reached the Ingush from Georgia (beginning from the 12th–13th centuries and again in the 17th century), and later from Russia (18th–19th centuries). Early Christian stone-box burials from this period were found near Metskhal and other villages.

The Metskhal tower complex was a large settlement consisting of two fortified castle complexes, including two battle towers. One of the battle towers had a flat roof and was clearly visible. Defensive walls and residential towers remained intact until 1944, when, following the deportation of Chechens and Ingush, the entire complex was mined and destroyed.

According to the stories passed down by the abreks (outlaws):

The Metskhal Tower was one of the largest. All attempts to destroy it ended in failure, and then the Soviet troops decided to fill the entire first floor with explosives. When the explosion was heard, nothing happened to it for several seconds, but a strong crack was heard. The tower was so strong that even with such a filling it was not torn to pieces, but it took off into the sky like a rocket, flew several meters high while being intact and fell on the ground and crashed!

== Bibliography ==
- Мальсагов, З. К. (1963). Оздоева, Ф. (ed.). Грамматика ингушского языка [Grammar of the Ingush language] (in Ingush and Russian). Vol. 5 (2nd ed.). Грозный: Чечено-Ингушское Книжное Издательство. pp. 1–164.
- Общенациональная Комиссия по рассмотрению вопросов, связанных с определением территории и границ Ингушетии (2021). Всемирный конгресс ингушского народа (ed.). Доклад о границах и территории Ингушетии (общие положения) [Report on the borders and territory of Ingushetia (general provisions)] (archival documents, maps, illustrations) (in Russian). Назрань. pp. 1–175.
- Картоев, М. М. (2014). Ингушетия в политике Российской империи на Кавказе. XIX век. Сборник документов и материалов [Ingushetia in the policy of the Russian Empire in the Caucasus. 19th century. Collection of documents and materials]. История Ингушетии: открытый архив (in Russian) (1st ed.). Ростов-на-Дону: Южный издательский дом. pp. 1–604. ISBN 978-5-98864-060-8.
- Долгиева, М. Б.; Картоев, М. М.; Кодзоев, Н. Д.; Матиев, Т. Х. (2013). Кодзоев, Н. Д. (ed.). История Ингушетии [History of Ingushetia] (4th ed.). Ростов-на-Дону: Южный издательский дом. pp. 1–600. ISBN 978-5-98864-056-1.
