= Suleyman's Eagle =

8th-century Arab bronze eagle, Russia

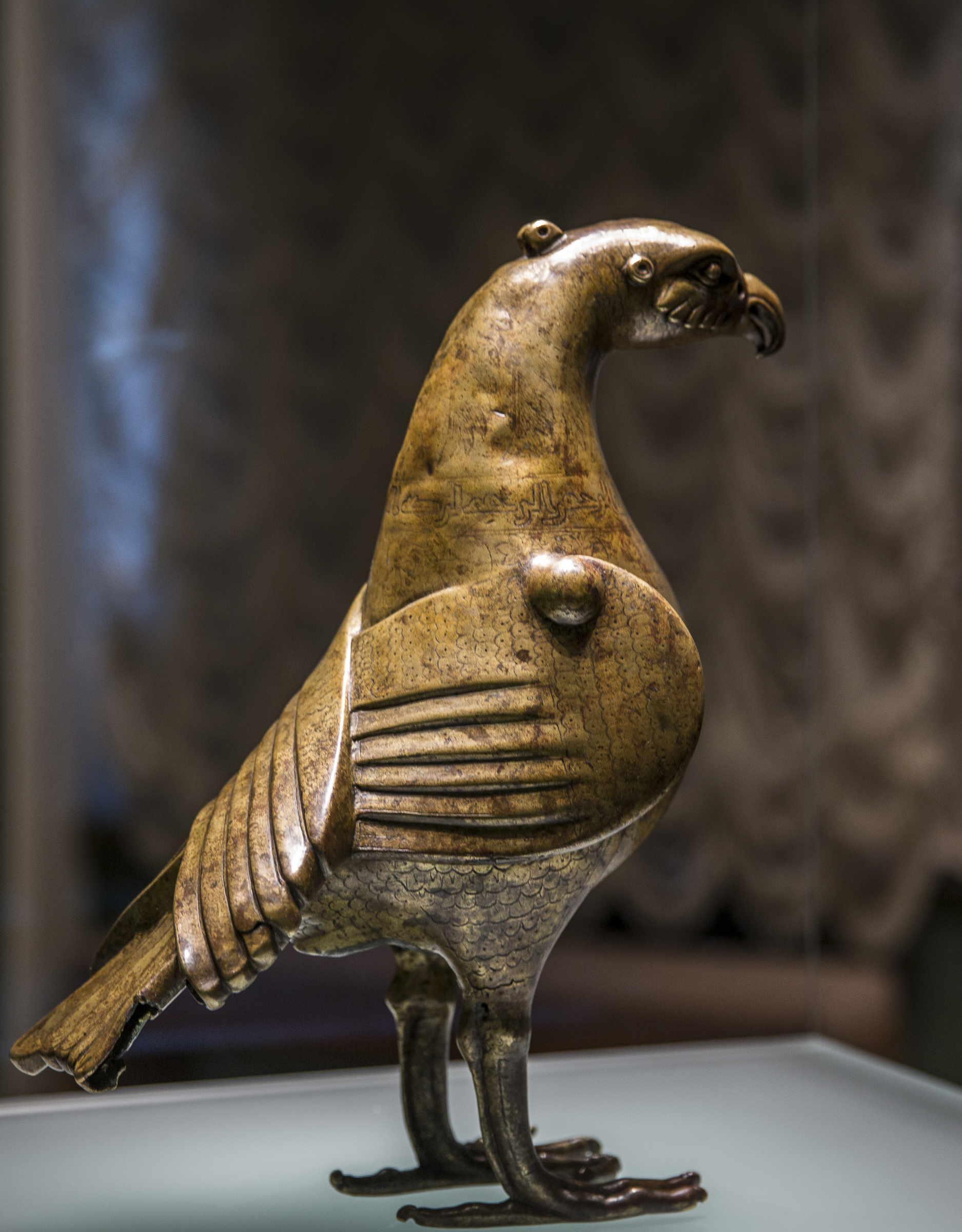
- Artist: Suleyman
- Year: 796 – 797
- Medium: Bronze sculpture
- Location: Hermitage Museum, Saint Petersburg, Russia

Suleyman's Eagle (Russian: Орёл Сулеймана, romanized: Oryol Suleymana) is a bronze figure of an eagle, made in the 8th century in the Abbasid Caliphate, first documented in the village of Erzi of the Republic of Ingushetia by Chakh Akhriev in 1875.

== History ==
In 1936 the statue was relocated to Leningrad (St. Petersburg), where it is still exhibited in the Hall of Culture and Art of the Hermitage Museum. Before nationalization and transfer to the Hermitage, for generations it was kept by the Ingush clan (teip) Mamilov, who used it as their coat of arms. V. B. Vinogradov wrote about the special reverence that strong birds enjoyed among the local Ingush highlanders, as the eagle may have been the totem of the inhabitants of Erzi.

The statue's height is 38 cm. It is hollow on the inside, inlaid with silver and copper. The neck is engraved in Arabic with the tasmiyyah:

بِسْمِ اللّهِ الرّحْمَنِ الرّحِيم

Translated into English: "In the Name of Allah, Most Gracious, Most Merciful." Embossed on the opposite side is the name of the master-manufacturer, "Suleyman", as well as the date of creation - year 189 of the Hijri calendar (equivalent to years 796–797 of the Gregorian calendar).

The official website of the Hermitage specified that the information about the place of manufacture of figurines can not be read, but the scientific community widely believes that this relic is made in Basra (now part of Iraq) - one of the cultural and craft centers of the Abbasid state. Only three similar in shape figurines exist in the world: in the Museum of Islamic Art in Berlin; in the city of Lucca in Italy; and in Saint Catherine's Monastery in Egypt.
