= Tyarsh =

Rural locality in Ingushetia

Tyarsh Тярш
- Aul

Other transcription(s)
  - Ingush: ТIаьрш (Note: • Commonly mentioned as 'Thärsh' (Ingush: ТIаьрш), however the village was sometimes mentioned as 'Thärshe' (Ingush: ТIаьрше).)
- Location of Tyarsh
- Location of Tyarsh Tyarsh (Republic of Ingushetia)
- Coordinates: 42°47′58″N 44°47′05″E
- Country: Russia
- Federal subject: Ingushetia

Population (2010 Census)
  - Total: 0
  - Estimate (2021): 0

Administrative status
  - Subordinated to: Dzheyrakhsky District
- Time zone: UTC+3 (MSK)
- Postal code(s): 386430
- OKTMO ID: 26620420136

Tyarsh or Tarsh (Note: Also Torsh, Tersh or Tershi.) (Ingush: ТIаьрш, romanized: Thärsh), is an aul in the Dzheyrakhsky District of Ingushetia. It is part of the rural settlement of Olgeti (administrative center rural settlement). Tyarsh is the ancestral aul of Ingush clan (teip) Torshkhoy (Ingush: ТIоаршхой).

== History ==
Historically Tyarsh was part of the Fyappin society.

In 1810–1811 according to the testimony of representatives of the Ingush in connection with the entry of the latter into Russian citizenship. The statement lists 13 villages of mountainous Ingushetia, among them, is Tarsh (Tershi) in which there are 29 households.

One theory suggests that Tarskoye valley got its name from the village of Tyarsh in the Metskhal society.

Researchers have also found evidence of festivities in honor of the god Bolom-Dyal in the villages of Arzi, Tyarsh, Kelbizhti and the area of Makhate.

=== Medieval Era ===
A large tower village of the castle type, Tyarsh was located on the spur of Mount Mat-Lam. The village was fortified with 3 combat, 3 semi-combat, and 8 residential towers, as well as stone defensive walls from the late Middle Ages. These towers were part of independent, but closely interconnected powerful castle complexes.

The Tyarsh village was known to be the origin of several prominent Ingush families, including the Tarshkhoevs, Daskievs, Daskhoevs, Marzabekovs, Polievs, Soslanovs, and Gudantovs.

=== Necropolis ===
0.3 km south of Tyarsh, on a gentle mountain slope, there is a compact group of necropolis of seven above-ground collective crypts from the late Middle Ages of the 16th-18th centuries. However, these crypts were partially destroyed in 1944.

North and north-west of Tyarsh, there are ground crypt tombs and a late medieval core-shaped mausoleum with a round base and a cone-shaped top.

== Geography ==
Tyarsh is located on the spurs of the Rocky Range. The nearest villages: in the north - Guli, in the south-west - Olgeti.

== Bibliography ==
- Атабиев, Б. Х. (2016). Проект границ территории, предмета охраны и зон охраны объекта культурного наследия федерального значения "комплекс сооружений" XV-XVII вв. (ансамбль). Республика Ингушетия, Джейрахский Муниципальный Район, с.п. Ольгетти, с. Эрзи [The project of the boundaries of the territory, the object of protection and zones of protection object of cultural heritage of federal significance "a complex of structures" of the XV-XVII centuries. (ensemble). Republic of Ingushetia, Dzheyrakhsky Municipal District, r.m. Olgetti, v. Erzi] (PDF) (in Russian). Нальчик: Институт Археологии Кавказа. pp. 1–154.
- Кобычев, Е. П. (1982). Поселения и жилище народов Северного Кавказа в XIX—XX вв. [Settlements and dwellings of the peoples of the North Caucasus in the 19th - 20th centuries] (in Russian). Москва: Наука. pp. 1–200.
- Барахоева, Н. М.; Кодзоев, Н. Д.; Хайров, Б. А. (2016). Ингушско-русский словарь терминов [Ingush-Russian dictionary of terms] (in Ingush and Russian) (2nd ed.). Нальчик: ООО «Тетраграф». pp. 1–288.
- Kodzoyev, N. D. (2021). Khayrova, R. R. (ed.). Русско-ингушский словарь [Russian-Ingush dictionary] (in Ingush and Russian). Rostov-on-Don: Laki Pak Typography. pp. 1–656. ISBN 978-5-906785-55-8.
- Мальсагов, З. К. (1963). Оздоева, Ф. (ed.). Грамматика ингушского языка [Grammar of the Ingush language] (in Ingush and Russian). Vol. 5 (2nd ed.). Грозный: Чечено-Ингушское Книжное Издательство. pp. 1–164.
- Генко, А. Н. (1930). "Из культурного прошлого ингушей" [From the cultural past of the Ingush]. Записки коллегии востоковедов при Азиатском музее [Notes of the College of Orientalists at the Asian Museum] (in Russian). Vol. 5. Ленинград: Издательство Академии наук СССР. pp. 681–761.
