= Khamkhins =

Ingush society

Хамхой
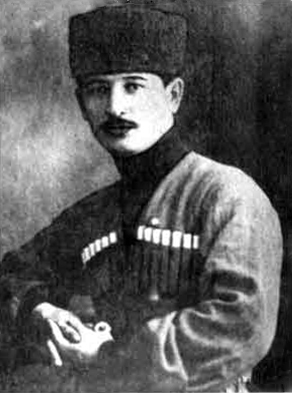
- Idris Zyazikov, representative of the society.

Regions with significant populations
- Ingushetia

Languages
- Ingush

Religion
- Sunni Islam

Khamkhins (Ingush: Хамхой, romanized: Khamkhoy), also known as Ghalghaï, were a historical Ingush ethnoterritorial society, (Note: Khamkhins were mentioned as an Ingush society by Blaramberg, "Overview of the political state of the Caucasus in 1840", "Caucasian Territory // Military Statistical Review of the Russian Empire, 1851", Ivanov, Bulletin of the Caucasian Department of the Imperial Russian Geographical Society, Volkonsky, Maksimov and Vertepov, Pantyukhov, Martirosian, Krupnov, Volkova, Dagestani branch of the Academy of Sciences of the Soviet Union, G. Anchabadze, Indiana University and V. A. Kuznetsov.) which was located in the upper reaches of the Assa River. The Khamkhin society, like the Tsorin society, was formed from the former "Ghalghaï society" as a result of the transfer of rural government to Khamkhi.

The Khamkhin society continued to be synonymously called "Ghalghaï", after the name of the historical region "Ghalghaïche", on the territory of which the society was formed. The name "Ghalghaïche" in turn comes from the self-name of the Ingush - "Ghalghaï", which had a central and broad meaning in Ingushetia, being a common self-name for other Ingush societies, united by a common territory, common language and culture.

== Geography ==
In the west Khamkhins bordered with the Fyappins, in the north with the Galashians, in the east with the Tsorins, in the south with Georgia.

== Bibliography ==
- Мальсагов, З. К. (1963). Оздоева, Ф. (ed.). Грамматика ингушского языка [Grammar of the Ingush language] (in Ingush and Russian). Vol. 5 (2nd ed.). Грозный: Чечено-Ингушское Книжное Издательство. pp. 1–164.
- Робакидзе, А. И., ed. (1968). Кавказский этнографический сборник. Очерки этнографии Горной Ингушетии [Caucasian ethnographic collection. Essays on the ethnography of Mountainous Ingushetia] (in Russian). Vol. 2. Тбилиси: Мецниереба. pp. 1–333.
- Терскій Областной Статистическій Комитет (1885). Благовѣщенскій, Н. А. (ed.). Списокъ населенныхъ мѣстъ Терской области: По свѣдѣніям къ 1-му января 1883 года [List of populated areas of the Terek region: According to information on January 1st of 1883] (in Russian). Владикавказъ: Типографія Терскаго Областнаго Правленія. pp. 1–78.
- Максимов, Е.; Вертепов, Г. (1892). Туземцы Северного Кавказа. Историко-статистические очерки. Выпуск первый. Осетины, ингуши, кабардинцы [Natives of the North Caucasus. Historical and statistical essays. First issue. Ossetians, Ingush, Kabardians] (in Russian). Владикавказ: Типография Областного правления Терской Области. pp. 1–189.
- Бларамберг, И. Ф. (2010). Историческое, топографическое, статистическое, этнографическое и военное описание Кавказа [Historical, topographical, statistical, ethnographic and military description of the Caucasus] (field research) (in Russian). Translated by Назарова, И. М. Москва: Издательство Надыршин. pp. 1–402. ISBN 978-5-902744-10-8.
- "Кавказский край" [Caucasian territory]. Военно-статистическое обозрение Российской империи: издаваемое по высочайшему повелению при 1-м отделении Департамента Генерального штаба [Military Statistical Review of the Russian Empire: published by the highest command at the 1st branch of the Department of the General Staff] (in Russian). Vol. 16. Part 1. СПб.: Типография Департамента Генерального штаба. 1851. pp. 1–274.
- Волконский, Н. А. (1886). "Война на Восточном Кавказе с 1824 по 1834 годы в связи с мюридизмом" [War in the Eastern Caucasus from 1824 to 1834 in connection with Muridism]. Кавказский сборник [Caucasian collection] (in Russian). Vol. 10. Тифлис. pp. 1–225.
- Пантюхов, И. И. (1901). Ингуши. Антропологический очерк [Ingush. An anthropological essay] (in Russian). Тифлис: Типография К. П. Козловского. Головинский пр.. д. № 12. pp. 1–35.
- Мартиросиан, Г. К. (1928). Нагорная Ингушия [Upland Ingushiya] (in Russian). Владикавказ: Государственная типография Автономной Области Ингушии. pp. 1–153.
- Крупнов, Е. И. (1971). Средневековая Ингушетия [Medieval Ingushetia] (in Russian). Москва: Наука. pp. 1–211.
- Волкова, Н. Г. (1973). Этнонимы и племенные названия Северного Кавказа [Ethnonyms and tribal names of the North Caucasus] (in Russian). Москва: Наука. pp. 1–210.
- Anchabadze, George (2001). Vainakhs (The Chechen and Ingush). Tbilisi: Caucasian House. pp. 1–76.
- Кузнецов, В. А. (2004). Введение в кавказоведение (историко-этнологические очерки народов Северного Кавказа) [Introduction to Caucasian Studies (Historical and Ethnological Essays on the Peoples of the North Caucasus)] (in Russian). Владикавказ: ИПП им. В. А. Гассиева. pp. 1–184.
- Павлова, О. С. (2012). Ингушский этнос на современном этапе: черты социально-психологического портрета [The Ingush ethnos at the present stage: features of the socio-psychological portrait] (in Russian). Москва: Форум. pp. 1–384. ISBN 9785911346652. OCLC 798995782.
- Кушева, Е. Н. (1963). Народы Северного Кавказа и их связи с Россией (вторая половина XVI — 30-е годы XVII века) [The peoples of the North Caucasus and their relations with Russia (the second half of the 16th - 30s of the 17th century)] (in Russian). Москва: Издательство Академии наук СССР. pp. 1–370.
