= Ingush societies =

Societies from the Caucasus region

Ingush societies (Ingush: ГIалгIай шахьараш, romanized: Ġalġay şaẋaraş, IPA: [ˈʁəɫʁəɪ ˈʃɑħəɾəʃ]) were autonomous ethno-territorial communities that formed the principal political and administrative units of traditional Ingush society. The formation and functioning of most of them dates back to the late Middle Ages. During this period, their boundaries, number and names changed.

The names of the societies were mainly derived from the names of the areas in which they were located, following a geographical principle, although some names may also have been associated with clan or ancestral origins. During this period, the Ingush lived in relatively isolated mountain gorges, which encouraged territorial fragmentation rather than consolidation around a single centre. Nevertheless, they retained a sense of shared ethnic identity based on a common culture and language.

Ingush societies in the literature are sometimes called shahars (Ingush: шахьар, romanized: şaẋar, lit. 'society, district' – from Persian شهر šahr 'city, town'). In ancient West Asian usage, the term shahar denoted a city or town and, in some contexts, an administrative territorial unit. Societies (shahars) of medieval Ingushetia were also territorial units. (Note: For example, in Province of Sassanid Empire, Asoristan, the provinces were known as šahr.)

== Etymology ==
The Ingush name for societies is shahar (шахьар) which is derived from Persian word shahr (شهر).

== History ==
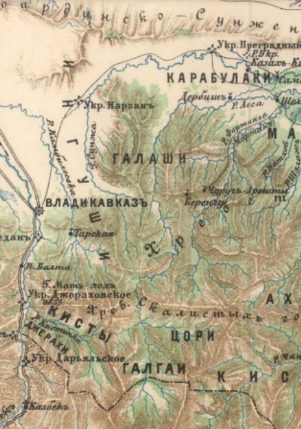
Map from the book "The assertion of Russian rule in the Caucasus" showing Ingush societies - Karabulaks, Galashians, Galgai etc.

The collapse of the Alanian state in the 13th century and the migration of its population into the mountains, where they settled to the east and west of the Darial Gorge and constructed fortifications, served as the basis for the formation of new ethno-territorial communities. Villages located in the mountainous zone were grouped mainly along local gorges, which contributed to their ethno-political consolidation into separate territorial societies/regions (Ingush: ГIалгIай Шахьараш). By the end of the 16th century, the main territorial societies of the Ingush had already formed. Based on the data of Russian sources of the 16th-17th centuries, which mention several Ingush territorial communities, it is suggested that in the 15th century there was a similar number of such societies, each uniting several villages.

Over time, the number and boundaries of these societies changed due to migration processes among the Ingush population, including movements back to the plains. These began relatively early, soon after Timur’s withdrawal from the North Caucasus. In their initial stages, they took the form of localized military-political actions undertaken by the Ingush in the lowlands in response to the settlement of nomadic groups in these areas.

Changes in the names and number of societies also occurred due to the transfer of rural administrative centres from one village to another. For example, the Kist (Feappii) society came to be known as the Metskhal society, while the Ghalghaï society later split into the Tsorin and Khamkhin societies.

== Political organization ==
According to the ethnographer Chakh Akhriev, the Ingush societies differed in their systems of governance. He describes the Dzherakh and Feappii as preserving traditions of hereditary ruling families tracing their origins to legendary founders. Their descendants were regarded as the rulers of their respective societies, although Akhriev notes that their political authority had diminished over time. In contrast, the Ghalghaï, Nazran and Karabulak societies are described as being governed by elected elders and judges. Akhriev concludes that hereditary aristocratic institutions among the Ingush were generally weaker than among many neighbouring Caucasian peoples.

== List of societies ==
- Sholkhi society
- Angusht society
- Dzherakh society
- Feappii society (Note: «Overview of the political state of the Caucasus in 1840», Caucasian Territory // "Military Statistical Review of the Russian Empire, 1851", Volkonsky, Pantyukhov, Kovalevsky, Martirosian, Krupnov, Volkova,)
- Khamkhin society
- Tsorin society
- Galashian society
- Nazranian society
- Orstkhoy society (Note: "Overview of the political state of the Caucasus in 1840", "Caucasian Territory // Military Statistical Review of the Russian Empire, 1851", Volkonsky, Pantyukhov, Kovalevsky, Martirosian, Krupnov.)
- Akkin society (Note: Bulletin of the Caucasian Department of the Imperial Russian Geographical Society, Volkonsky, Terskiy Sbornik, Martirosian, Kusheva, Hakluyt Society, Krupnov.)
- Malkhin society (Note: Malkhins as an Ingush society is indicated in the "Military Statistical Review of the Russian Empire, published by the highest order at the 1st branch of the Department of the General Staff". Malkhins in the literature of the 19th-20th centuries also were known under name "Distant Kists". Under this name, they are also indicated as an Ingush society: "Overview of the political state of the Caucasus in 1840", I. I. Pantyukhov, G. K. Martirosian, Kusheva, E. I. Krupnov.)

== Bibliography ==
=== English sources ===
- Widengren, G. (1987). "Āsōristān". In Yarshater, Ehsan (ed.). Encyclopædia Iranica. Vol. II/8: Aśoka IV–Āṯār al-Wozarāʾ. London and New York: Routledge & Kegan Paul. pp. 785–786. ISBN 978-0-71009-108-6.
- Hakluyt Society (1970). Keatinge, Maurice (ed.). Works Issued by the Hakluyt Society. London: The Society. pp. 1–640.

=== Russian sources ===
- Бекова, А. И.; Дударов, У. Б.; Илиева, Ф. М.; Мальсагова, Л. Д.; Тариева, Л. У. (2009). Ингушско-русский словарь [Ingush-Russian Dictionary] (in Ingush and Russian). Нальчик: «Республиканский полиграфкомбинат им. Революции 1905 г.». pp. 1–990. ISBN 978-5-88195-965-4.
- Вертепов, Г. А. (1892). "Ингуши: Историко-статистический очерк" [Ingush: Historical and statistical essay]. In Максимов, Е.; Вертепов, Г. А. (eds.). Туземцы Северного Кавказа. Историко-статистические очерки. Выпуск первый. Осетины, ингуши, кабардинцы [Natives of the North Caucasus. Historical and statistical essays. First issue. Ossetians, Ingush, Kabardians] (in Russian). Владикавказъ: Тип. Областного правления Терской Области. pp. 71–138.
- "Кавказский край" [Caucasian territory]. Военно-статистическое обозрение Российской империи: издаваемое по высочайшему повелению при 1-м отделении Департамента Генерального штаба [Military Statistical Review of the Russian Empire: published by the highest command at the 1st branch of the Department of the General Staff] (in Russian). Vol. 16: Part 1. СПб.: Тип. Департамента Генерального штаба. 1851. pp. 1–274.
- Волкова, Н. Г. (1974). Гарданов, В. К. (ed.). Этнический состав населения Северного Кавказа в XVIII — начале XX века [Ethnic composition of the population of the North Caucasus in the 18th - early 20th centuries] (in Russian). Москва: Наука. pp. 1–276.
- Волконский, Н. А. (1886). "Война на Восточном Кавказе с 1824 по 1834 годы в связи с мюридизмом" [War in the Eastern Caucasus from 1824 to 1834 in connection with Muridism]. In Чернявский, И. С. (ed.). Кавказский сборник [Caucasian collection] (in Russian). Vol. 10. Тифлис: Тип. Окружного штаба Кавказского военного округа. pp. 1–224.
- Горепекин, Ф. И. (2006). "Краткие сведения о народе «ингуши»" [Brief information about the people "Ingush"]. In Албогачиева, М.С-Г.; Мартазанов, А. А. (eds.). Труды Фомы Ивановича Горепекина [Works of Foma Ivanovich Gorepekin] (in Russian). СПб.: Ладога. pp. 1–204. ISBN 5-98635-011-1.
- Genko, A. N. (1930). "Из культурного прошлого ингушей" [From the cultural past of the Ingush] (PDF). Записки коллегии востоковедов при Азиатском музее [Notes of the College of Orientalists at the Asian Museum] (PDF) (in Russian). Vol. 5. Leningrad: Izd-vo Akademii nauk SSSR. pp. 681–761.
- Далгат, У. Б. (1972). Дахкильгов, И. А. (ed.). Героический эпос чеченцев и ингушей: Исследование и тексты [The Heroic Epos of the Chechens and Ingush: Research and Texts] (in Russian). Москва: Наука. pp. 1–466.
- Долгиева, М. Б.; Картоев, М. М.; Кодзоев, Н. Д.; Матиев, Т. Х. (2013). Кодзоев, Н. Д. (ed.). История Ингушетии [History of Ingushetia] (4th ed.). Ростов-на-Дону: Южный издательский дом. pp. 1–600. ISBN 978-5-98864-056-1.
- Ковалевский, П. И. (1914). Народы Кавказа [Peoples of the Caucasus] (in Russian). СПб.: Тип. М. И. Акинфиева. pp. 1–346.
- Кодзоев, Н. Д. (2002). "Глава 4" [Chapter 4]. История Ингушского народа [The History of the Ingush people] (in Russian). Магас: Сердало. Archived from the original on 2012-05-11.
- Кодзоев, Н. Д. (2021). Хайрова, Р. Р. (ed.). Русско-ингушский словарь [Russian-Ingush dictionary] (in Ingush and Russian). Ростов-на-Дону: Типография «Лаки Пак». pp. 1–656. ISBN 978-5-906785-55-8.
- К ингушской терминологии: термины «район», «город», «улица» [To the Ingush terminology: the terms "district", "city", "street"]. Материалы научной конференции, посвящённой культуре и истории ингушского народа «Гӏалгӏайче—Хьо—Со—МоцагӀе—Даимле» (1 ed.). Назрань. 1999.
- Крупнов, Е. И. (1971). Средневековая Ингушетия [Medieval Ingushetia] (in Russian). Москва: Наука. pp. 1–211.
- Кушева, Е. Н. (1963). Народы Северного Кавказа и их связи с Россией (вторая половина XVI — 30-е годы XVII века) [The peoples of the North Caucasus and their relations with Russia (the second half of the 16th - 30s of the 17th century)] (PDF) (in Russian). Москва: Изд-во Академии наук СССР. pp. 1–368.
- Мартиросиан, Г. К. (1928). Нагорная Ингушия [Upland Ingushiya] (in Russian). Владикавказ: Государственная типография Автономной Области Ингушии. pp. 1–153.
- Пантюхов, И. И. (1901). Ингуши: Антропологический очерк [Ingush: An anthropological essay] (in Russian). Тифлис: Тип. К. П. Козловского. pp. 1–35.
- Пиотровский, Б. Б.; Нарочницкий, А. Л., eds. (1988). История народов Северного Кавказа с древнейших времён до конца XVIII в. [The history of the peoples of the North Caucasus from ancient times to the end of the 18th century] (in Russian). Москва: Наука. pp. 1–544. ISBN 5-02-009486-2.
- Робакидзе, А. И., ed. (1968). Кавказский этнографический сборник. Очерки этнографии Горной Ингушетии [Caucasian ethnographic collection. Essays on the ethnography of Mountainous Ingushetia] (in Russian). Vol. 2. Тбилиси: Мецниереба. pp. 1–333.
- Танкиев, А. Х. (1991). "Мохк вӀашагӀтохарах" [Reunification of the country]. Ингушский фольклор [Ingush folklore] (in Ingush). Грозный: Чечено-Ингушское кн. изд-во.
