= Mamilov =

The Mamilovs (Note: Russian: Мамилов(ы); Ingush: Мамилгнаькъан, romanized: Mamilnäqhan) are an Ingush tribal organization/clan (teip). The clan comprises about 1,500 people. It is one of a few Ingush clans whose members share one name.

They come from the village of Erzi Dzheyrakhsky District Ingushetia, which has been, since 2000, a part of the State Nature Reserve "Erzi". At this time, they live mostly in Malgobeksky District and Dzheyrakhsky District of Ingushetia.

== History ==
=== Early history ===
The Ingush local historian and ethnographer Chakh Akhriev described the origins of the clan as follows:

Kist – the son of a famous Syrian the owner of the house Kamen (Comnenus), during the first Crusades moved from Syria and Abkhazia, and hence, after a while, went to the Georgia. But Georgia was at that time in the sad state of constant attacks Arabs and Turkish, so that Kist was forced to run away from here into impregnable Caucasus Mountains and lived in one of the gorges North Caucasus, near the headwaters of Terek and ... His son Chard (according to some – Cha) was also the son Chard. The latter was built in Arzi (Erzi) 16 "siege" towers and castles that exist at the present time. After Chard followed by his direct descendants: Oedipus, Elbiaz and the sons of the last Manuel (Mamil) and And (Yand). After the death of Manuel (Mamil) his son Daurbek quarreled with his uncle And, left Kist society and moved to a nearby, Dzherahovskoe society.

The clan has a relationship with Yandiev and Dakhkilgov clans.

== Bibliography ==
- Волкова, Н. Г. (1974). Гарданов, В. К. (ed.). Этнический состав населения Северного Кавказа в XVIII — начале XX века [Ethnic composition of the population of the North Caucasus in the 18th - early 20th centuries] (in Russian). Москва: Наука. pp. 1–276.
- Волкова, Н. Г.; Анчабадзе, Ю. Д. (1993). Симченко, Ю. Б. (ed.). Народы Кавказа [Peoples of the Caucasus] (in Russian). Москва: ИЭИА. pp. 1–265. ISSN 0868-586X.
- Дахкильгов, Ш. Э-Х. (1991). Зязиков, А. А. (ed.). Происхождение ингушских фамилий [Origin of Ingush surnames] (in Russian). Гр.: «Книга». pp. 1–108.
- Кодзоев, Н. Д.; Киева, З. Х. (2021). Накостхоев, Х. А.; Хайрова, Р. Р. (eds.). Ономастикон Ингушетии [Onomasticon of Ingushetia] (in Russian). Москва: ТПК «Центробланк». pp. 1–121. ISBN 978-5-91303-022-1.
- Мартиросиан, Г. К. (1933). История Ингушии [History of Ingushiya] (in Russian). Орджоникидзе: Сердало.
- Смирнов, И. А.; Боков, X. X.; Виноградов, В. Б.; Гойгова, З. А.-Г.; Гриценко, Н. П.; Крупнов, Е. И.; Саламов, А. А.; Симарзин, В. С.; Топоколян, Н. А.; Чентиева, М. П., eds. (1967). Очерки истории Чечено-Ингушской АССР [Essays on the history of the Chechen-Ingush ASSR] (in Russian). Vol. 1. Гр.: Чечено-Ингушское книжное изд-во. pp. 1–315.
