= Erzi (aul) =

Rural locality in Ingushetia

Erzi Эрзи
- Aul

Other transcription(s)
  - Ingush: Аьрзи
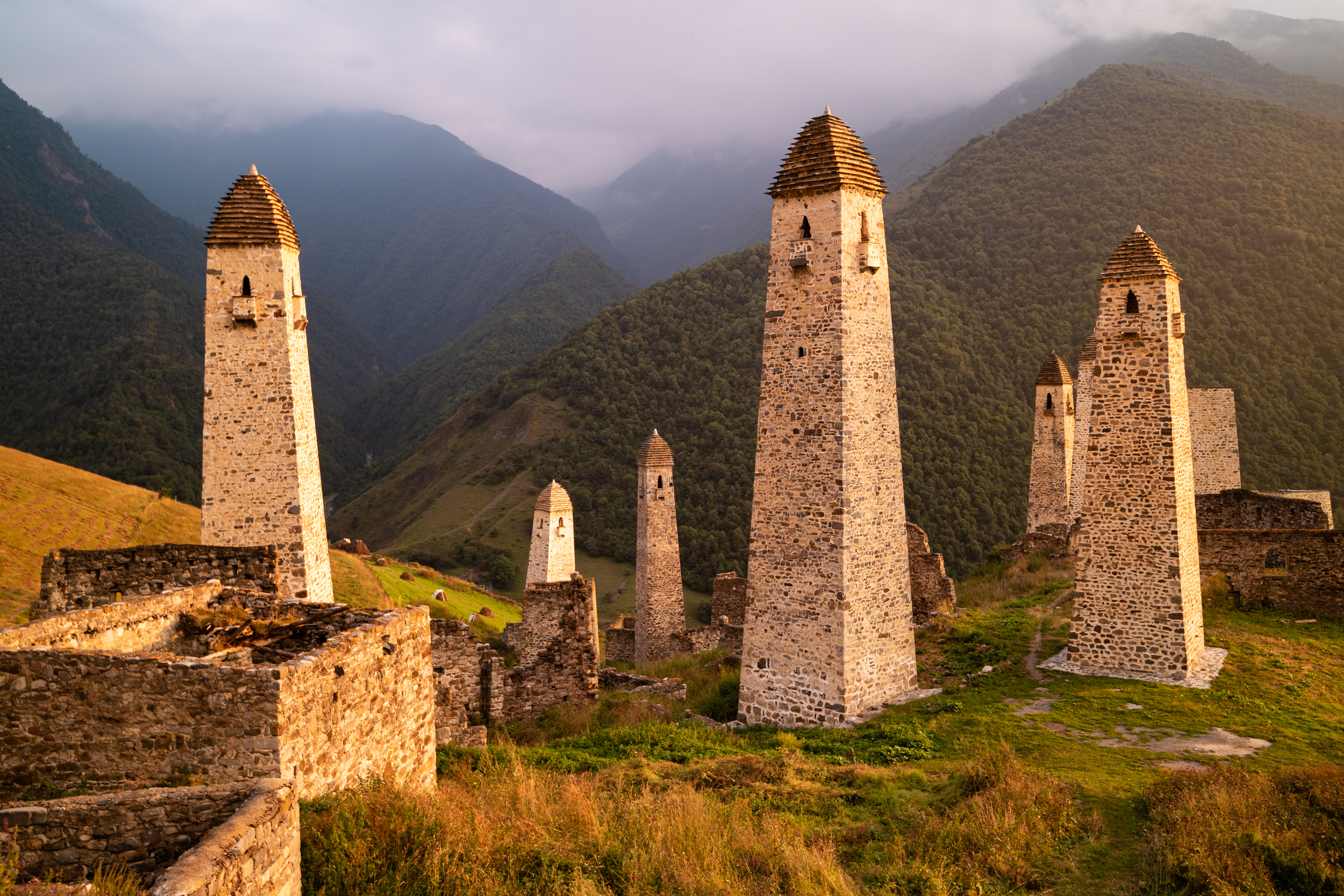
- Interactive map of Erzi
- Location of Erzi Erzi (Republic of Ingushetia)
- Coordinates: 42°48′13″N 44°45′34″E
- Country: Russia
- Federal subject: Ingushetia

Population (2010 Census)
  - Total: 0
  - Estimate (2010): 0 )

Administrative status
  - Subordinated to: Dzheyrakhsky District
- Time zone: UTC+3 (MSK)
- OKTMO ID: 26620420126

Erzi (Russian: Эрзи; Ingush: Аьрзи, romanized: Ärzi, lit. 'Eagle') is a medieval village (aul) in the Dzheyrakhsky District of Ingushetia, Russia, in the North Caucasus. The village's complex of Ingush towers is one of the principal historical monuments in the Erzi Nature Reserve, which takes its name from the settlement.

Erzi forms part of the Olgeti rural settlement, and also lies within the Dzheyrakh-Assa State Historical, Architectural and Natural Museum-Reserve, where it is under state protection.

== Nomenclature ==
The word "Erzi" (Аьрзи) translates from the Ingush as 'eagle'. According to Ingush folklore, Erzi was founded on a site where there was once an eagle's nest.

== Geography ==
Erzi is located within the Erzi Nature Reserve, in western Ingushetia, in the North Caucasus of southern Russia. The settlement lies at an elevation of approximately 1,250 to 1,300 m (4,100 to 4,270 ft) on the right bank of the Armkhi River, at the southern end of a spur of Mount Dzharlam.

Nearby tower settlements include Hamishke and Koshk to the north, Kerbite to the southeast, Lyazhgi to the west, and Angeti to the east.

== History ==
The settlement is traditionally considered to have been founded by Prince Kist, while his son Cha is credited with building its fortified towers. His descendants formed the Oartskhoy clan, whose branches include several influential Ingush families, notably the Yandievs, Mamilovs, and Aldaganovs. The name Oartskhoy combines the name of the settlement, Erzi, with the suffix -khoy (meaning 'of') and thus translates as 'of Erzi'. Other sources attribute the establishment of Erzi to Yand, progenitor of the Yandiev family, the 'principal family‘ of Erzi, who kept guard there and took tribute for passage.

During the pre-Islamic period, a strong cultural and religious relationship existed with the neighbouring tower complexes Tyarsh and Shoan.

Erzi was home to several Ingush families, territorially attributed to the Fyappin, Metskhalin or Kistin society.

Ethnographic accounts from Erzi describe its inhabitants as engaging in raids, during which captives were taken and held for ransom. Those who were not ransomed became slaves of their captors or were sold.

On May 14, 1733, Bodscha and Karadscha Yandiev, swore an oath of allegiance to Vakhtang VI of Kartli.

On January 8, 1811, Erzi became part of the Russian Empire through an agreement signed by Khasa and Itar Yandiev.

In 1931, a rare and very important find was made in the village of Erzi: a bronze censer in the shape of an eagle, known as Suleyman's Eagle, though some historians believe it be a detail of an ancient military standard. It was made in the 8th century (year 189 of the Hijri calendar) in the Arab Caliphate. In 1936 the statue was relocated to St. Petersburg, where it is exhibited in the Hall of the Culture and Art of the Hermitage Museum.

"Apparently, strong birds enjoyed special reverence among the local highlanders, and may have been the totem of the inhabitants of Erzi. It is no coincidence that the ancient and numerous family of the Mamilovs (the native Erzians), had an image of an eagle as their coat of arms. It is likewise no coincidence that the Armkhi River, roaring deep in the gorge, received from Ossetian neighbors, the, at first glance, unexpected name “Makkal-don” (meaning “river of kites”), and the Ingush themselves, the inhabitants of the gorge, are called among the Ossetians “Makkal” or “Makkalon” ”, i.e. "kite people". The eagle and the kite in ornithology (the science of birds) are close relatives, they belong to the same family – hawks. Consequently, behind the Ossetian "makkal" and the Ingush "erzi" are close concepts of raptors, the special role of which in the life and religious ideas of the population of the Dzherakh Gorge left an indelible mark in these places."

— Vitaly Vinogradov

In 2012–2015 the tower complex was reconstructed. It has 8 combat, 2 semi-combat, 47 residential towers, 1 temple, and over 20 burial grounds, including the mausoleum of the famous tower builder Yand.

In 2019, carbon dating of a tower at Erzi indicated that it was constructed between 1683 and 1723.

== In literature ==
Erzi serves as the real-world basis for the village of "Arzia" in the 1883 novel The Patricide by the classic Georgian writer Alexander Kazbegi. In the text, the settlement is located beyond the Gvirgala (Gveleti) mountain pass near the Khde gorge and is described as being inhabited by "Kistins".

In the plot, Arzia serves as a safe haven for the protagonists. A local resident named Parcho and his family shelter the fugitives Koba and Vepkhia after their escape from a Russian Cossack outpost, while a local healer tends to the wounded Iago until he is fit to continue his journey.

== Gallery ==
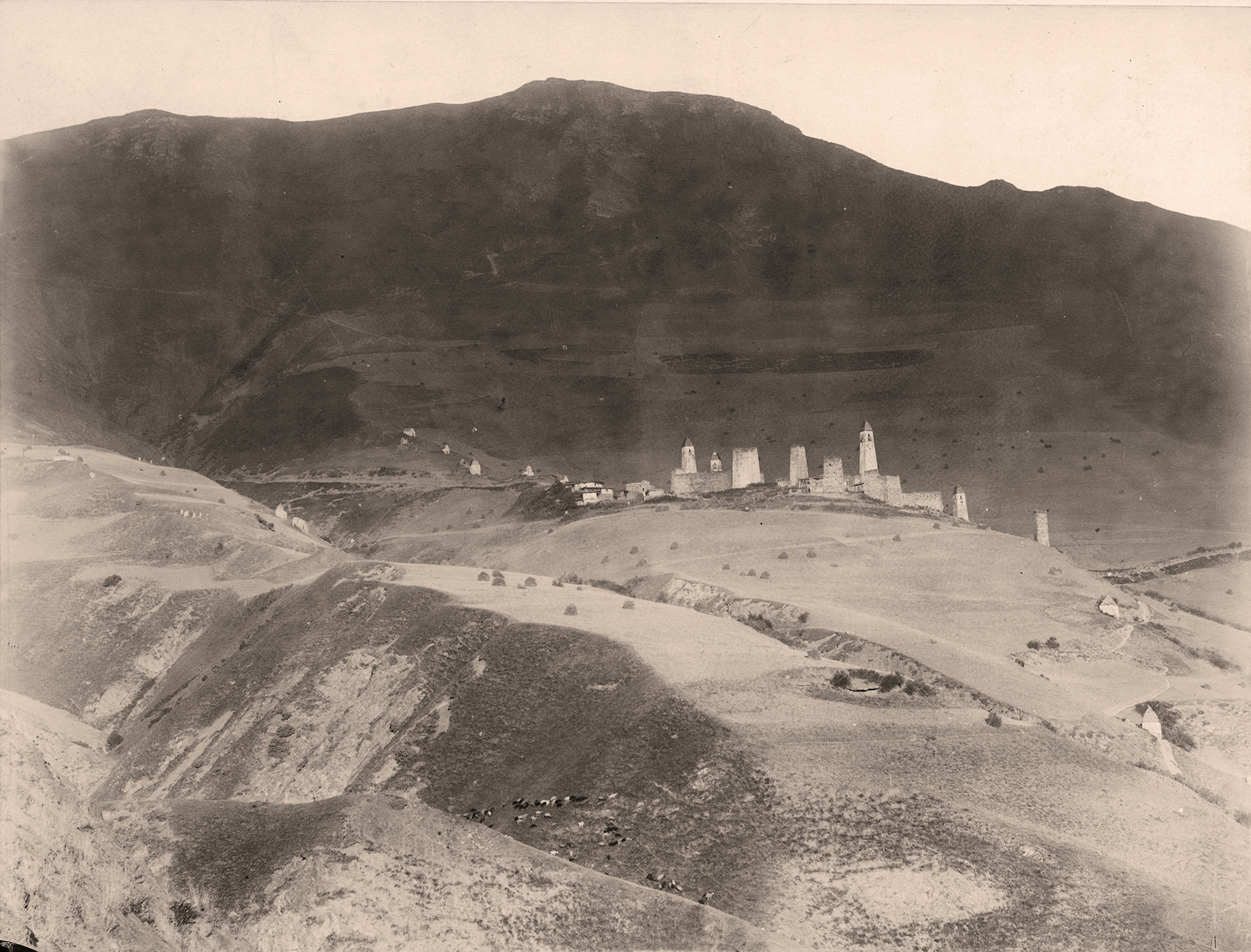
View on aul Erzi and the Armkhi valley. Late XIX century.

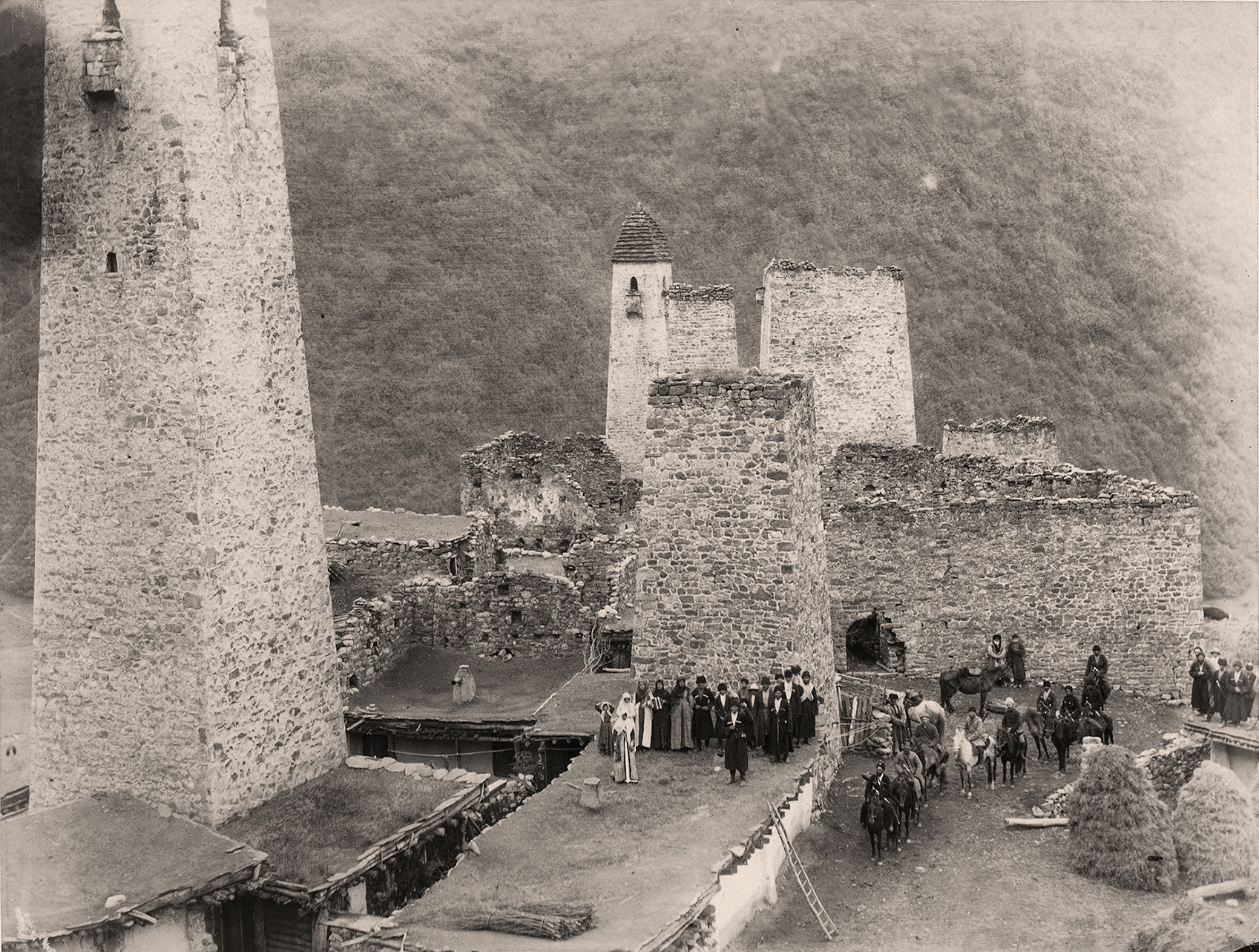
Tourists arriving at Erzi village at the end of the XIX century.

== Bibliography ==
=== Russian sources ===
- Виноградов, В. Б. (1966). Смирнов, К. Ф. (ed.). Тайны минувших времен [Secrets of past times] (PDF) (in Russian). Москва: Наука. pp. 1–167. Archived (PDF) from the original on August 11, 2023.
- Воронов, Н. И.; Кавказскій отдѣлъ Императорскаго русскаго географическаго общества (1869). "Списокъ горскихъ ауловъ Кубанской и Терской областей" [List of mountain villages of the Kuban and Terek Oblasts]. Сборникъ статистическихъ свѣдѣній о Кавказѣ [Collection of statistical information about the Caucasus] (in Russian). Vol. 1. Тифлисъ: Типографія Главнаго Управленія Намѣстника Кавказскаго; Типографія Меликова и К. pp. 41–52 (418–429 as PDF). Archived from the original on April 8, 2023.
- Гамрекели, В. П. (1968). Григолиа, К. Г. (ed.). Документы по взаимоотношениям Грузии с Северным Кавказом в XVIII в. [Documents on relations between Georgia and the North Caucasus in the 18th century] (in Russian). Тбилиси: Мецниереба. pp. 1–333. Archived from the original on July 13, 2023.
- Картоев, М. М. (2020). Ингушетия в политике Российской империи на Кавказе. XIX век. Сборник документов и материалов [Ingushetia in the policy of the Russian Empire in the Caucasus. 19th century. Collection of documents and materials]. История Ингушетии: открытый архив (in Russian) (2nd ed.). Ростов-на-Дону: Южный издательский дом. pp. 1–760. ISBN 978-5-98864-060-8.
- Мальсагов, З. К. (1925). Ингушская грамматика со сборником ингушских слов [Ingush grammar with a collection of Ingush words] (in Russian). Владикавказ: Гостип. „СВЕТ“ И. А. О. pp. 1–224. Archived from the original on February 23, 2023.
