= Olgeti =

Rural locality in Ingushetia

Olgeti Ольгети
- Selo

Other transcription(s)
  - Ingush: Оалгатӏе
- Interactive map of Olgeti
- Location of Olgeti Olgeti (Republic of Ingushetia)
- Coordinates: 42°47′59″N 44°45′25″E
- Country: Russia
- Federal subject: Ingushetia

Population (2010 Census)
  - Total: 318
  - Estimate (2021): 0 (−100%)

Administrative status
  - Subordinated to: Dzheyrakhsky District
- Time zone: UTC+3 (MSK)
- Postal code: 386435
- OKTMO ID: 26620420101

Olgeti (Ingush: Оалгатӏе, romanized: Oalgathe, IPA: [ˈɔ̯ɑɫɡət’ʲe]), also sometimes mentioned as Olgetti is a rural locality (a selo) in Dzheyrakhsky District of the Republic of Ingushetia, Russia. It forms the municipality of the rural settlement of Olgeti as its administrative center.

== Geography ==
Olgeti is located on the banks of the Armkhi river, southeast of the district center Dzheyrakh. The nearest settlements with a permanent population are: in the northeast, the village of Guli; and, in the west, the village of Lyazhgi.

== History ==
In 2002, the village was badly damaged by a mudflow.

On October 22, 2018, a mosque for 500 people was opened in Olgeti.

== Bibliography ==
- Mal'sagov, Zaurbek (1963). Ozdoeva, Firuza (ed.). Грамматика ингушского языка [Grammar of the Ingush language] (in Ingush and Russian). Vol. 5 (2nd ed.). Grozny: Checheno-Ingush Book Publishing House. pp. 1–164.
