= Meredzhi (village) =

Rural locality in Chechnya

Meredzhi Мереджи
- Selo

Other transcription(s)
  - Chechen: Мержа
  - Ingush: Мерж, Мерже
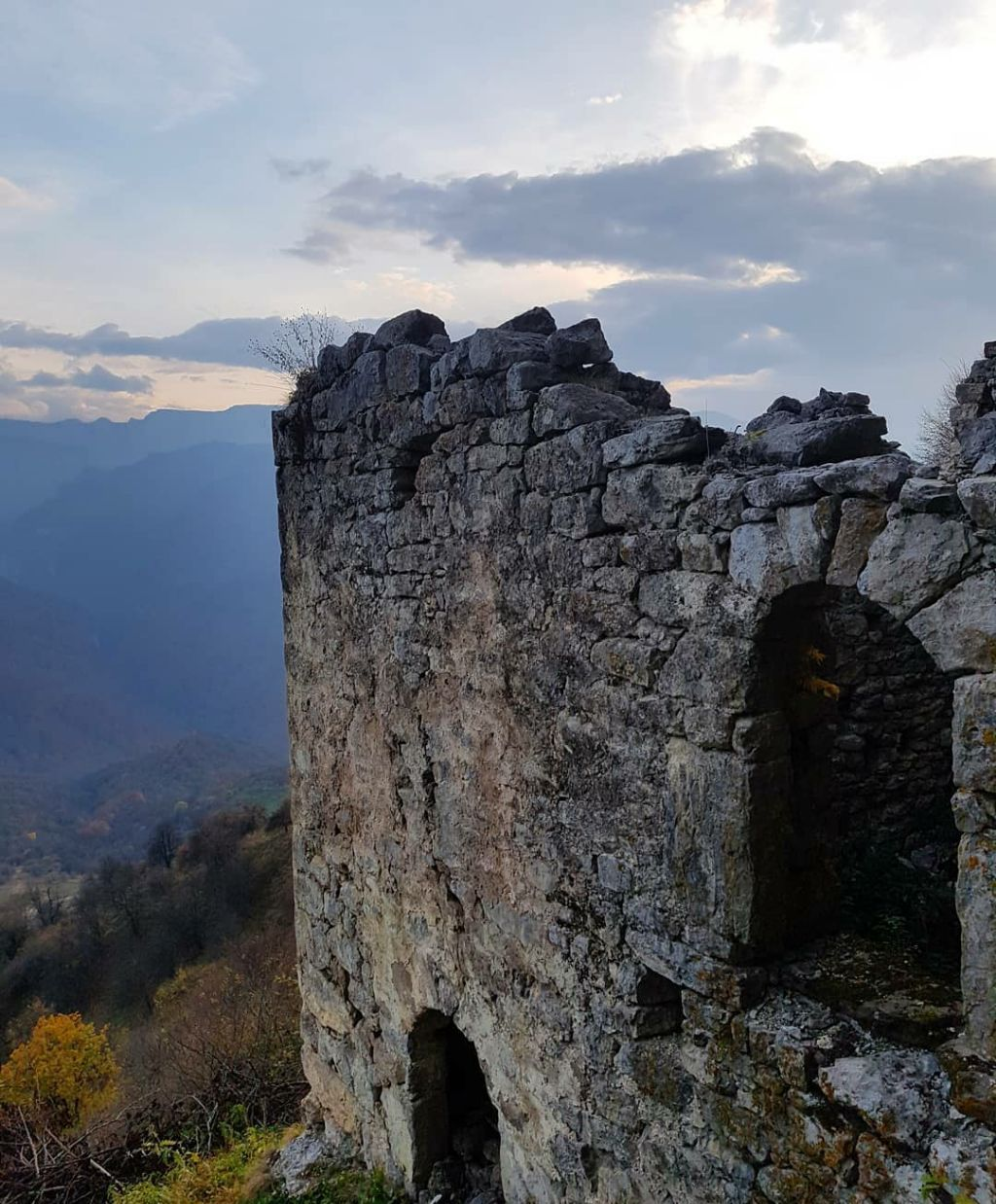
- Interactive map of Meredzhi
- Location of Meredzhi Meredzhi (Chechnya)
- Coordinates: 42°56′16″N 45°07′58″E
- Country: Russia
- Federal subject: Chechnya

Population (2010 Census)
  - Total: 0
  - Estimate (2021): 0 )

Administrative status
  - Subordinated to: Galanchozhsky District

Meredzhi (Note: • Russian: Мереджи • Chechen: Мержа, romanized: Merzha • Ingush: Мерж, romanized: Merzh; Мерже, romanized: Merzhe.) is a non-residential rural locality (a selo) in Galanchozhsky District of the Republic of Chechnya, Russia (Until September 26, 2018, it was in the Sunzhensky District of Ingushetia).

== History ==
=== Background ===
The village consists of three smaller settlements—Dak-Bukh, Dalg-Bukh and Chork-Bukh(Guloi and Khaikharoi representatives village). It's predominantly made up of wooden buildings due to its geographical location—the needed wood is available at nearby forests. Meredzhi was one of the centre villages of Meredzhi Society. The Chechen-Ingush clan (teip) of Merzhoy originated from it. Due to good climate and hydrogeological conditions, the population of the village was primarily engaged in arable farming and cattle breeding but also gardening.

In the second half of the 18th century (1770s), the German researcher J. A. Güldenstädt indicated the village of Meredzhi among the total number of ingush (Kist) villages which he opposes them with the Chechens. Meredzhi was mentioned as an Ingush village in 1823 by S. M. Bronevskiy.

In 1858, Naib of Little Chechnya Said-Dulla by order of Nikolay Yevdokimov made punitive raids on Shagot-Kokh, Dattykh, Azerze, Meredzhi and other villages, where many abreks were hiding. In maps of 1850s Meredzhi is shown in ruins.

=== Russian rule ===
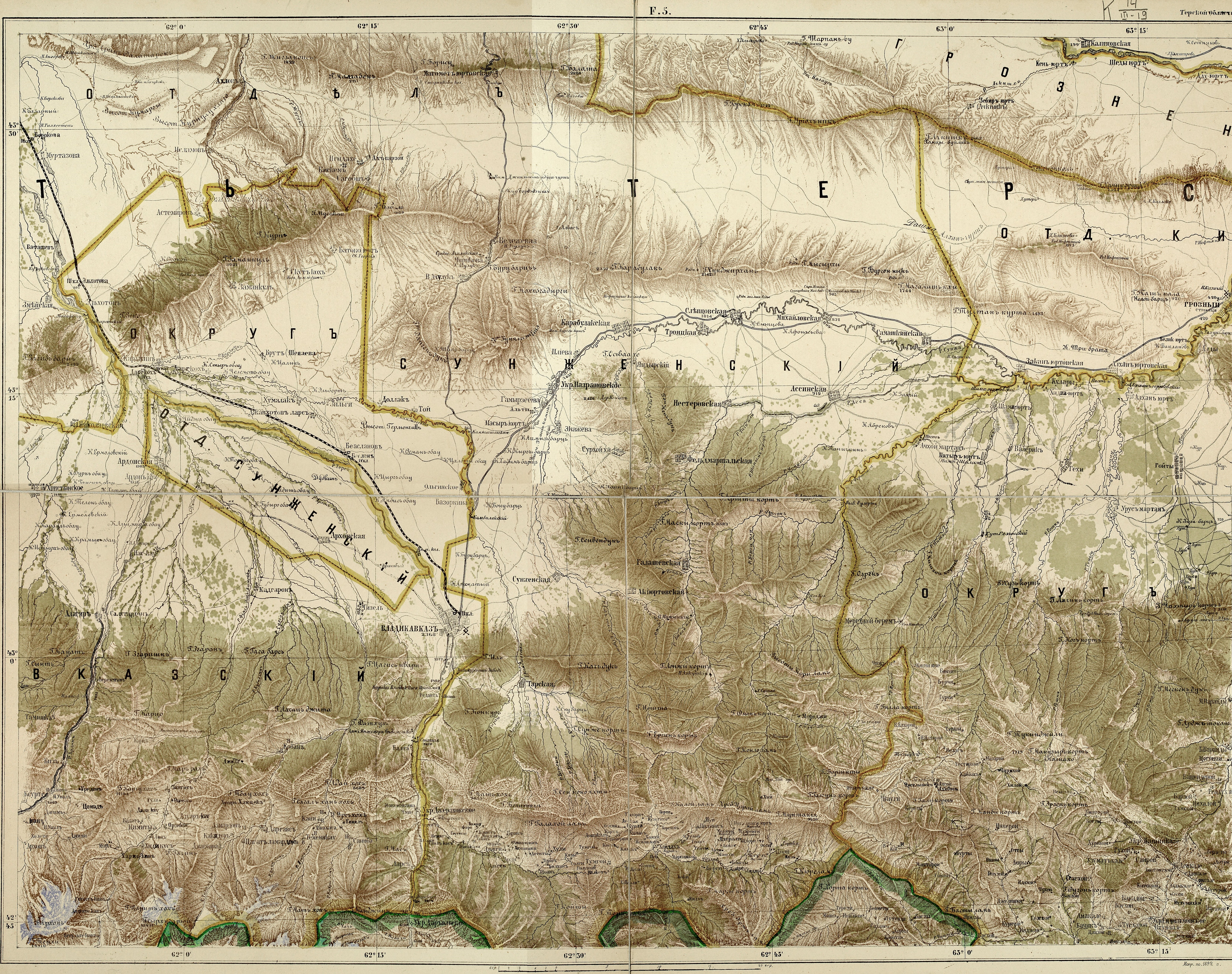
The village Meredzhi on the map of Sunzhensky otdel in 1892.

In 1862, the Ingush okrug was established as part of the Western Department of Terek Oblast. The village of Meredzhi was part of the Gorsky uchastok of the Ingush okrug. In 1866 the Meredzhi was ceded to the Argun okrug due to them belonging to the same nation as the locals (Chechen) and geographically closer to the central governance of the okrug.

=== Soviet rule ===
During the deportation of the Chechens and Ingush, the village's population was deported to Central Asia and became uninhabited. Only tourists wandered in the village. With the abolishment of Checheno-Ingush ASSR, Meredzhi became part of Pervomaysky raion of the Grozny Oblast and was subordinated to the village of Pervomaysky (modern day Galashki). With the restoration of Chechen-Ingush autonomy, Meredzhi was included in the Sunzhensky raion of Checheno-Ingush ASSR.

=== Modern ===
During the Insurgency in the North Caucasus, Chechen militants set up their camp near Meredzhi. On March 28 2011, Russian Air Forces carried out airstrikes using a drone on the camp, killing 16 of the militants including a prominent commander—Supyan Abdullayev during the operation. Although originally assumed that Doku Umarov was among the militants dead, this was disproven as his supposed body wasn't found. Having taken medical supplies, He left the camp few hours before the operation took place.

With the connection to the start of the summer tourist season, the Committee of the Republic of Ingushetia for Tourism, together with local authorities of the Sunzhensky District, organized tourist trips to Meredzhi on 12 May 2018.

== Demographics ==
National censuses done by the Russian empire and the Soviet Union in 1874, 1883, 1891, 1914 and 1926 showed that all of the inhabitants of Meredzhi and its surrounding villages were ethnic Chechens in all 5 censuses.

== Geography ==
Meredzhi is located on the right bank of the Fortanga river, on the Meredzhi river, at the foot of the Kyurelam mountain range. The nearest settlements: in the northwest (downstream of Fortanga) — the village of Dattykh, in the northeast (upstream of Fortanga) — the village of Gandalbos, in the west – the village of Tsecha-Akhki, in the east – the village of Khaykharoy.

== Gallery ==
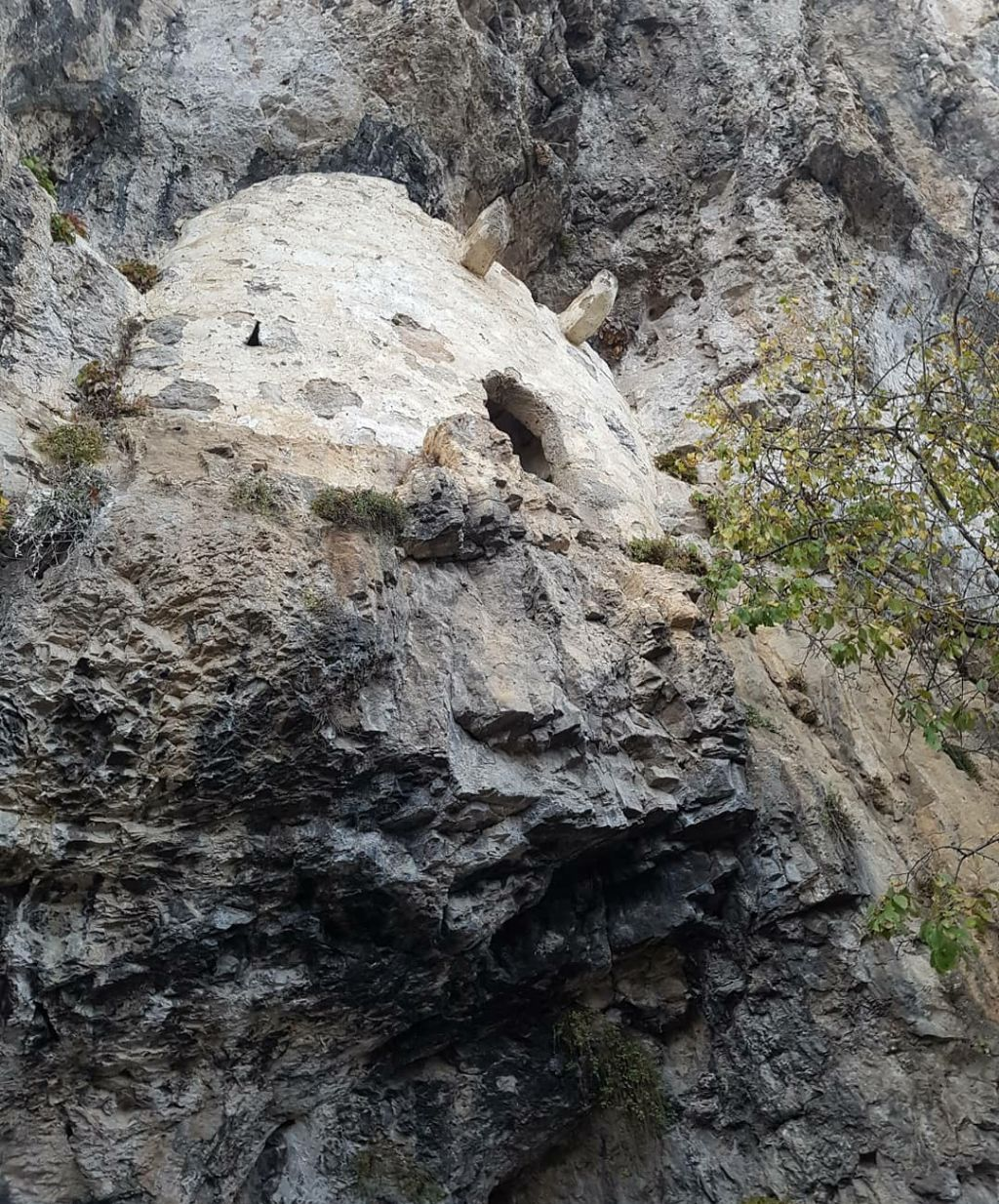
Tower in between a cliff

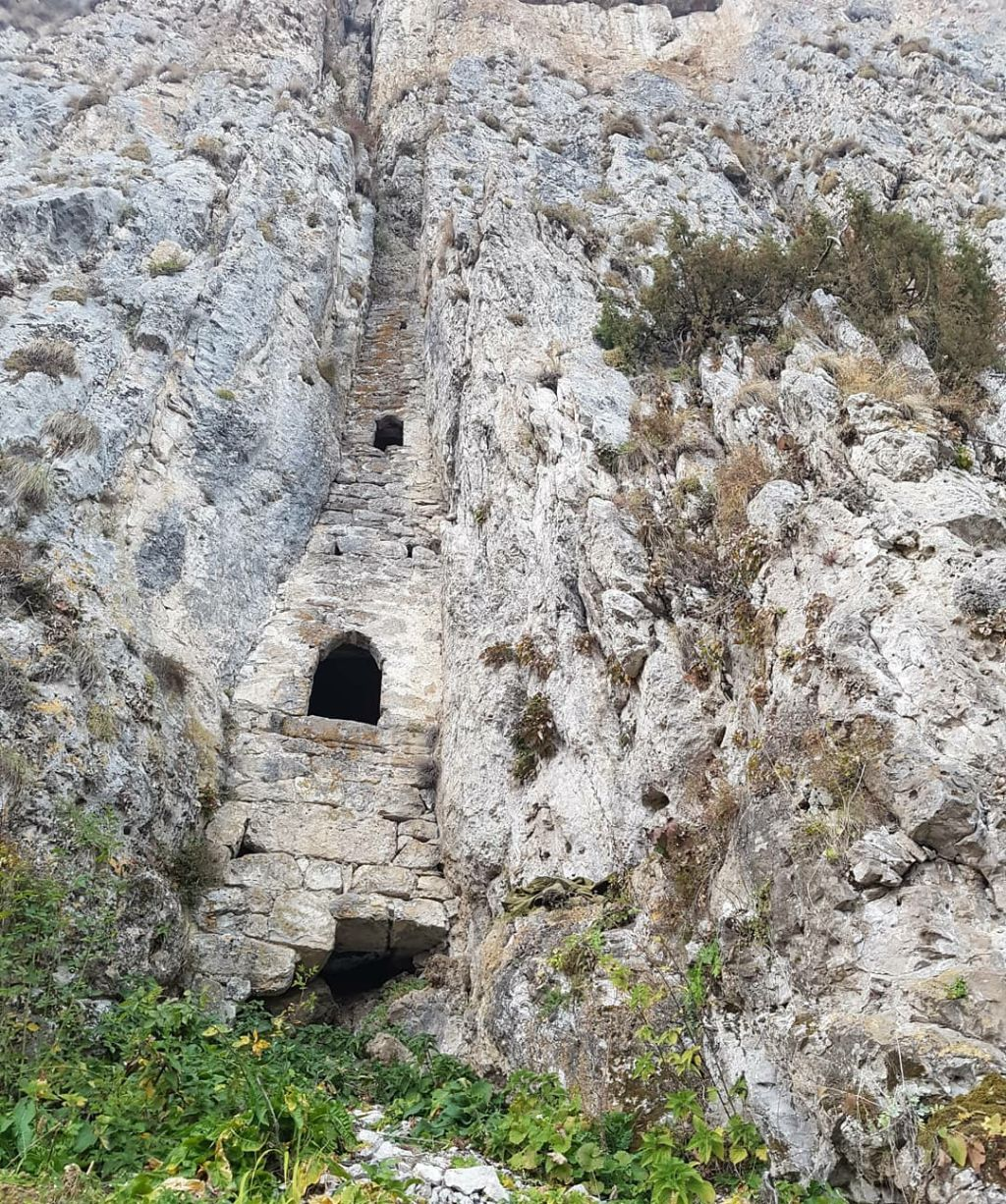
Tower in between a cliff

== Bibliography ==
- Berge, Adolf (1991) [1859]. Kupriyanova, E. A. (ed.). Чечня и чеченцы [Chechnya and Chechens] (in Russian). Grozny (Tiflis): Kniga [Tip. gl. upr. Namestnika Kavk.] pp. 1–107.
- Grigoryev, Aleksandr (March 31, 2011). ""Неуловимого Джо" Умарова в уничтоженном лагере в Ингушетии искать бесполезно" [It is useless to look for the "elusive Joe" Umarov in the destroyed camp in Ingushetia]. Argumentti nedeli (in Russian).
- Dzaurova, Tanzila (September 10, 2017). "Экспедиция в Мереджи" [Expedition to Meredzhi]. www.dzurdzuki.com (in Russian).
- Ivanov, M. A. (1904). Pagirev, D. D. (ed.). "В горах между рр. Фортанги и Аргуном" [In the mountains between the rivers of Fortanga and Argun]. Изв. КО ИРГО (in Russian). 17. Tiflis: Tip. K. P. Kozlovskogo: 31–129 (dept. 2).
- Kobychev, Veniamin (1982). Gardanov, Valentin (ed.). Поселения и жилище народов Северного Кавказа в XIX—XX вв [Settlements and housing of the peoples of the North Caucasus in the 19th–20th centuries] (in Russian). Moscow: Nauka. pp. 1–194.
- Kodzoev, Nurdin; Kieva, Zufira (2021). Nakostkhoev, Kh. A.; Khayrova, R. R. (eds.). Ономастикон Ингушетии [Onomasticon of Ingushetia] (in Russian). Moscow: TPK "Centroblank". pp. 1–121. ISBN 978-5-91303-022-1.
- Mashkin, Sergei (March 30, 2011). Mikhaylin, Mikhail (ed.). "Весь имарат одним ударом: В Ингушетии подводят итоги спецоперации" [The entire Emirate with one blow: The results of the special operation are being summed up in Ingushetia]. Kommersant (in Russian). No. 54. Moscow: Kommersant. p. 5. eISSN 1563-6380. ISSN 1561-347X. OCLC 244126120.
- Общенациональная Комиссия по рассмотрению вопросов, связанных с определением территории и границ Ингушетии (2021). Всемирный конгресс ингушского народа (ed.). Доклад о границах и территории Ингушетии (общие положения) [Report on the borders and territory of Ingushetia (general provisions)] (archival documents, maps, illustrations) (in Russian). Назрань. pp. 1–175.
- Неравноценный обмен Ингушетии с Чечнёй: анализ картографов [The unequal exchange of Ingushetia with Chechnya: an analysis of cartographers]. Caucasian Knot Кавказский Узел (in Russian). 2018.
- Suleymanov, Ahmad (1978). Топонимия Чечено-Ингушетии [Toponymy of Checheno-Ingushetia] (in Russian). Vol. II часть: Горная Ингушетия (юго-западная часть), Горная Чечня (центральная и юго-восточная части). Grozny: ChIKI. pp. 1–289.
- Tsoroev, Ibragim (May 10, 2018). "Комтуризма Ингушетии проводит туристический поход к средневековым башенным комплексам" [The Tourism Committee of Ingushetia conducts a tourist trip to medieval tower complexes]. Ingushetia (in Russian).
- Zheng, Junzhi (December 13, 2018). Ingouchie-Tchétchénie: l'accord de la discorde [Ingushetia-Chechnya: the agreement of discord] (Article) (in French). Orient XXI.
- Гюльденштедт, Иоганн Антон (2002). "VI. Провинция Кистия, или Кистетия" [VI. Province of Kistia, or Kistetia]. In Карпов, Ю. Ю. (ed.). Путешествие по Кавказу в 1770–1773 гг. [Journey through the Caucasus in 1770–1773.] (in Russian). Translated by Шафроновской, Т. К. Санкт-Петербург: Петербургское Востоковедение. pp. 238–243. ISBN 5-85803-213-3.
- Броневский, С. М. (1823). "Кисты (глава третья)" [Kists (chapter three)]. Новейшие географические и исторические известия о Кавказе (часть вторая) [The latest geographical and historical news about the Caucasus (part two)] (PDF) (in Russian). Москва: Типография С. Селивановского. pp. 151–186.
- Kartoev, Magomet (2020). Ингушетия в политике Российской империи на Кавказе. XIX век. Сборник документов и материалов [Ingushetia in the policy of the Russian Empire in the Caucasus. 19th century. Collection of documents and materials] (in Russian) (2 ed.). Ростов-на-Дону: Южный издательский дом. pp. 1–760. ISBN 978-5-98864-060-8.
- Воронов, Н. И.; Кавказский отдел Императорского русского географического общества (1869). "Список горских аулов Кубанской и Терской областей" [List of mountain villages of the Kuban and Terek Oblasts]. Сборник статистических сведений о Кавказе [Collection of statistical information about the Caucasus] (in Russian). Тифлис: Типография Главного Управления Наместника Кавказского; типогрфия Меликова и К. pp. 41–52 (418–429 as PDF).
- Зейдлиц, Н. (1878). Терская область. Список населённых мест по сведениям 1874 года [Terek region. List of populated places according to 1874]. Списки населенных мест Кавказского края (in Russian) (1st ed.). Тифлис: Типография Главного управлении наместника Кавказского. pp. 1–81.
