= Gorsky Uchastok =

Gorsky Uchastok Горскiй участокъ
- Uchastok
- Country: Russian Empire
- Viceroyalty: Caucasus
- Oblast: Terek
- Okrug: Ingushskiy
- Established: 1860
- Abolished: 1870
- Capital: Vladikavkaz

Gorsky Uchastok (Note: Russian: Горскiй участокъ, romanized: Gorsky uchastok; Ingush: Лоаман шахьар, romanized: Loaman shahar) was a territorial-administrative unit (uchastok) of the Ingushskiy Okrug of the Terek Oblast of the Russian Empire. The area of the Gorsky Uchastok made up Dzheyrakhsky and part of the Sunzhensky Districts of Ingushetia.

== History ==
After the end of the Caucasian War, the military administration of the Caucasus was eliminated and in 1860, the entire territory of the North Caucasus was divided into the Stavropol Governate, Kuban, Terek and Dagestan oblasts. The Terek Oblast consisted of 8 districts (okrugs), one of which was Ingushskiy Okrug.

The Gorsky Uchastok was created and it was one of the four uchastoks (Note: The four uchastoks: Nazranovskiy, Psedakhskiy, Gorsky and Karabulakskiy. (Note: In 1865, the Karabulakskiy Uchastok of the Ingushskiy Okrug was liquidated, and its lands were divided between the Sunzha Cossacks and the Chechenskiy Okrug.)) making up the Ingushskiy Okrug. In 1866, the territory of the Meredzhi and Akkin societies was separated from the Gorskiy Uchastok of the Ingushskiy Okrug and subordinated to the administration of the Argunskiy Okrug.

== Administrative Division ==
Settlements of Gorskiy Uchastok: Dzheyrakh, Pamyat, Armkhi, Lyazhgi, Tsori, Khamkhi, Tumgi, Khuli, Egikhal, Bisht, Doshkhakle, Kyazi, Shoan, Salgi, Metskhal, Garkh, Furtoug, Kusht, Koshk Morch, Eban, Kerbete, Kharp, Beyni, Olgeti, Tsoli, Niy, Pyaling, Targim, Barkhane, Barakh, Leimi, Kart, Ozdik, Nilkh, Pui, Tsorkh, Kyakhk, Ersh, Ezmi, Kost, Nyakist, Hani, Gadaborsh, Torsh, Tori, Khay, Koli, Myashkhi, Vovnushki, Tsyzdy, Gul. In 1866, the settlements of Akki and parts of the Meredzhi societies — Yalkhoroy, Akki, Vilah, Kerete, Galanchozh, Kerbychi, Orzmikale, Vauge — were separated from the Gorsky section of the Ingushsky Okrug and attached to the Argunskiy Okrug.

== Demographics ==
As of 1868 census, the population of Gorsky Uchastok was 5763 (2915 men and 2848 women).

== Bibliography ==
- Грабовскій, Н. Ф. (1870). "Экономическій и домашній бытъ жителей Горскаго участка Ингушевскаго округа" [Economic and domestic life of the inhabitants of the Gorsky Uchastok of the Ingushevskiy Okrug]. Сборникъ свѣдѣній о кавказскихъ горцахъ. Вып. 3 [Collection of information about the Caucasian highlanders. 3rd issue] (in Russian). Тифлис: Типографія Кавказскаго Горскаго Управленія. pp. 1–32 (113–144 as PDF).
- Дубровин, Н. Ф. (1871). Исторія войны и владычества русскихъ на Кавказѣ [The history of the war and domination of Russians in the Caucasus] (in Russian). Vol. 1: Book 1. СПб: Типографія Департамента удѣлов. pp. 1–656.
- Албогачиева, М.С.-Г.; Мартазанов, А. М.; Соловьева, Л. Т., eds. (2013). Ингуши [The Ingush] (in Russian). Москва: Наука. pp. 1–512.
- Албогачиева, М. С.-Г. (2015). "Демаркация границ Ингушетии" [Demarcation of the borders of Ingushetia] (PDF). In Карпов, Ю. Ю. (ed.). Горы и границы: Этнография посттрадиционных обществ [Mountains and Borders: An Ethnography of Post-Traditional Societies] (in Russian). СПб.: МАЭ РАН. pp. 168–255. ISBN 978-5-88431-290-6.
- Воронов, Н. И.; Кавказскій отдѣлъ Императорскаго русскаго географическаго общества (1869). "Списокъ горскихъ ауловъ Кубанской и Терской областей" [List of mountain villages of the Kuban and Terek Oblasts]. Сборникъ статистическихъ свѣдѣній о Кавказѣ [Collection of statistical information about the Caucasus] (in Russian). Vol. 1. Тифлисъ: Типографія Главнаго Управленія Намѣстника Кавказскаго; Типографія Меликова и К. pp. 41–52 (418–429 as PDF).
- "Горская лѣтопись" [Mountain chronicle]. Сборник свѣдѣній о кавказскихъ горцахъ [Collection of information about the Caucasian highlanders] (in Russian). Тифлисъ: Типографія Главнаго Управленія Намѣстника Кавказскаго. 1868. pp. 1–72 (338–408 as PDF).
