= Karabulakskiy Uchastok =

Karabulakskiy Uchastok Карабулакскiй участокъ
- Uchastok
- Country: Russian Empire
- Viceroyalty: Caucasus
- Oblast: Terek
- Okrug: Ingushskiy
- Established: 1860
- Abolished: 1865

Karabulakskiy Uchastok (Note: Russian: Карабулакскiй участокъ, romanized: Karabulakskiy uchastok; Ingush: Орстхой шахьар, romanized: Orstkhoy shahar) was a territorial-administrative unit (uchastok) of the Ingushskiy Okrug of the Terek Oblast of the Russian Empire. The area of the Gorsky Uchastok made up Sunzhensky District of Ingushetia and Achkhoy-Martanovsky District of Chechnya.

== History ==
After the end of the Caucasian War, the military administration of the Caucasus was eliminated and in 1860, the entire territory of the North Caucasus was divided into the Stavropol Governate, Kuban, Terek and Dagestan oblasts. The Terek Oblast consisted of 8 districts (okrugs), one of which was Ingushskiy Okrug.

The Karabulakskiy Uchastok was created and it was one of the four uchastoks (Note: The four uchastoks: Nazranovskiy, Psedakhskiy, Gorsky and Karabulakskiy.) making up the Ingushskiy Okrug.

In 1865, the Karabulakskiy Uchastok of the Ingushskiy Okrug was liquidated, and its lands were divided between the Sunzha Cossacks and the Chechenskiy Okrug.

== Administrative Division ==
Settlements of Karabulakskiy Uchastok as of 1864: Batash-Yurt, Ah-Borzy, Bumut, Shinalyk, Nesterovsky, Samiyaguch, Mergist, Arshty, Chemulga, Bereshki, Alkhasty, Datykh, Gaziyurt.

== Demographics ==
As of 1864 census, the population of Karabulakskiy Uchastok was 6902 (3420 men and 3482 women).

== Bibliography ==
- Албогачиева, М.С.-Г.; Мартазанов, А. М.; Соловьева, Л. Т., eds. (2013). Ингуши [The Ingush] (in Russian). Москва: Наука. pp. 1–512.
- Албогачиева, М. С.-Г. (2015). "Демаркация границ Ингушетии" [Demarcation of the borders of Ingushetia] (PDF). In Карпов, Ю. Ю. (ed.). Горы и границы: Этнография посттрадиционных обществ [Mountains and Borders: An Ethnography of Post-Traditional Societies] (in Russian). СПб.: МАЭ РАН. pp. 168–255. ISBN 978-5-88431-290-6.
- Общенациональная Комиссия по рассмотрению вопросов, связанных с определением территории и границ Ингушетии (2021). Всемирный конгресс ингушского народа (ed.). Доклад о границах и территории Ингушетии (общие положения) [Report on the borders and territory of Ingushetia (general provisions)] (archival documents, maps, illustrations) (in Russian). Назрань. pp. 1–175.
