= Ingush okrug =

District of Terek Oblast

Ingush okrug Ингушевскiй округъ
- Okrug
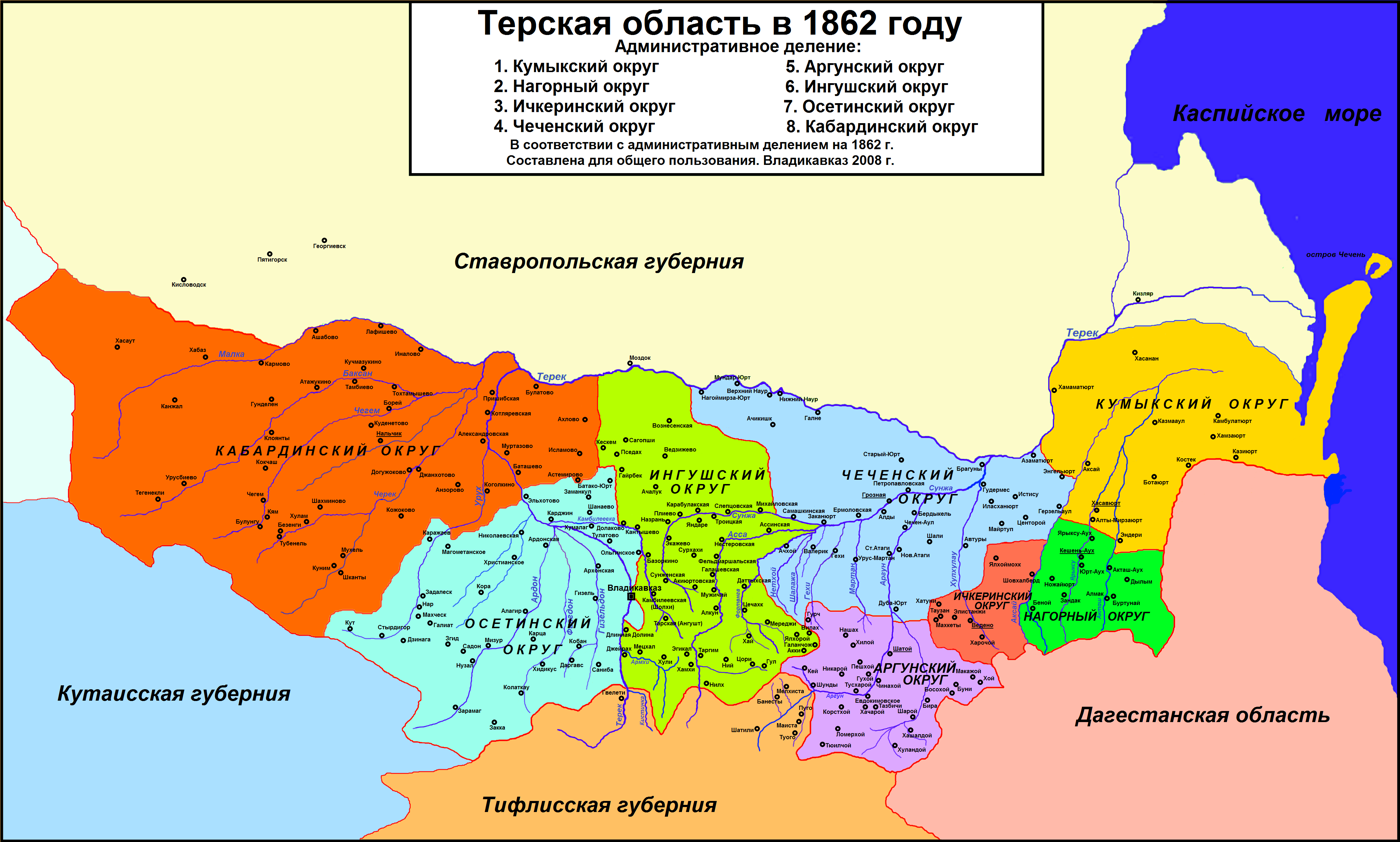
- Location in the Terek Oblast in green
- Country: Russian Empire
- Viceroyalty: Caucasus
- Oblast: Terek
- Established: 1862
- Abolished: 1871
- Capital: Vladikavkaz

Area
  - Total: 1,526.14 km^{2} (589.25 sq mi)

Population (1870)
  - Total: 32 315
  - Density: 0.021/km^{2} (0.054/sq mi)
  - Rural: 100.00%

Ingush okrug (Note: Russian: Ингушский округ, pre-reform orthography: Ингушевскій округъ, romanized: Ingushskiy okrug, Ingushevskiy okrug; Ingush: Гӏалгӏай окре, romanized: Ghalghai okre.) was a district (okrug) of the Terek Oblast of the Caucasus Viceroyalty of the Russian Empire. The area of the Ingushskiy okrug made up part of the North Caucasian Federal District of Russia.

Established in 1862 as a military district of the Terek Oblast, it existed for approximately 9 years. In 1865 the Karabulakskiy Uchastok was abolished due to the resettlement of the majority of its population (Karabulaks). In 1867, two societies, Merzhoy and Akkins, were ceded to the neighboring Argunskiy Okrug. Finally, in 1871, Ingushskiy Okrug was combined with the Ossetinskiy okrug into a new district, Vladikavkazsky okrug.

== Geography ==
It was located in the central part of the North Caucasus in the basin of the Terek, Sunzha, Assa and Fortanga rivers, covering the territory of modern Ingushetia, parts of the Mozdok and Prigorodny regions of North Ossetia, Sernovodsky and parts of the Achkhoy-Martanovsky regions of the Chechen Republic.

It bordered in the west with the Ossetinskiy Okrug, in the northwest with the Kabardinskiy Okrug, in the north with the Stavropol Governorate, in the east with the Chechenskiy Okrug, in the southeast with the Argunskiy Okrug, in the south along the Caucasus Range with the Tiflis Governorate.

== History ==
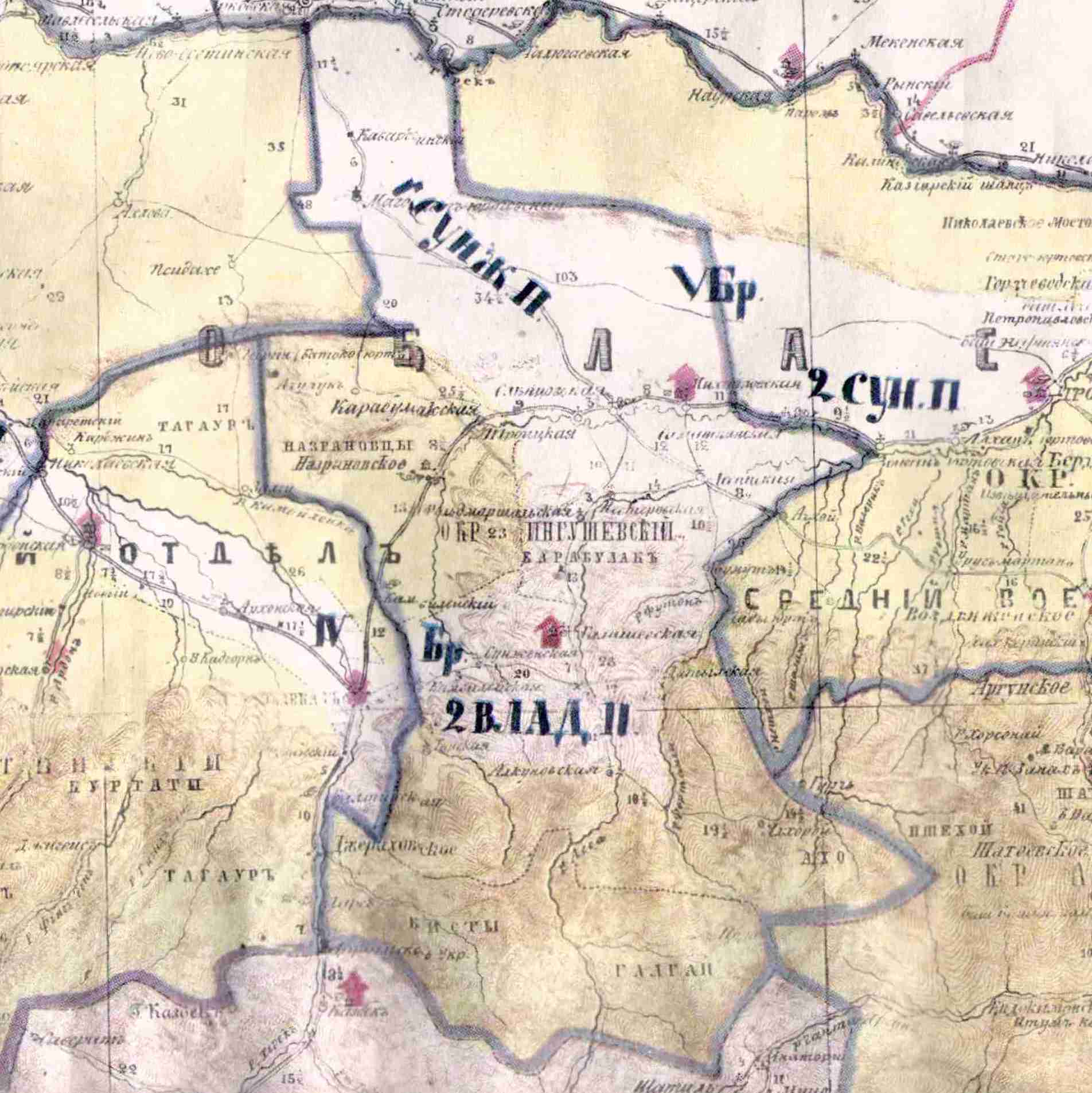
Ingushskiy Okrug on the Road map of the Caucasus region in 1853.

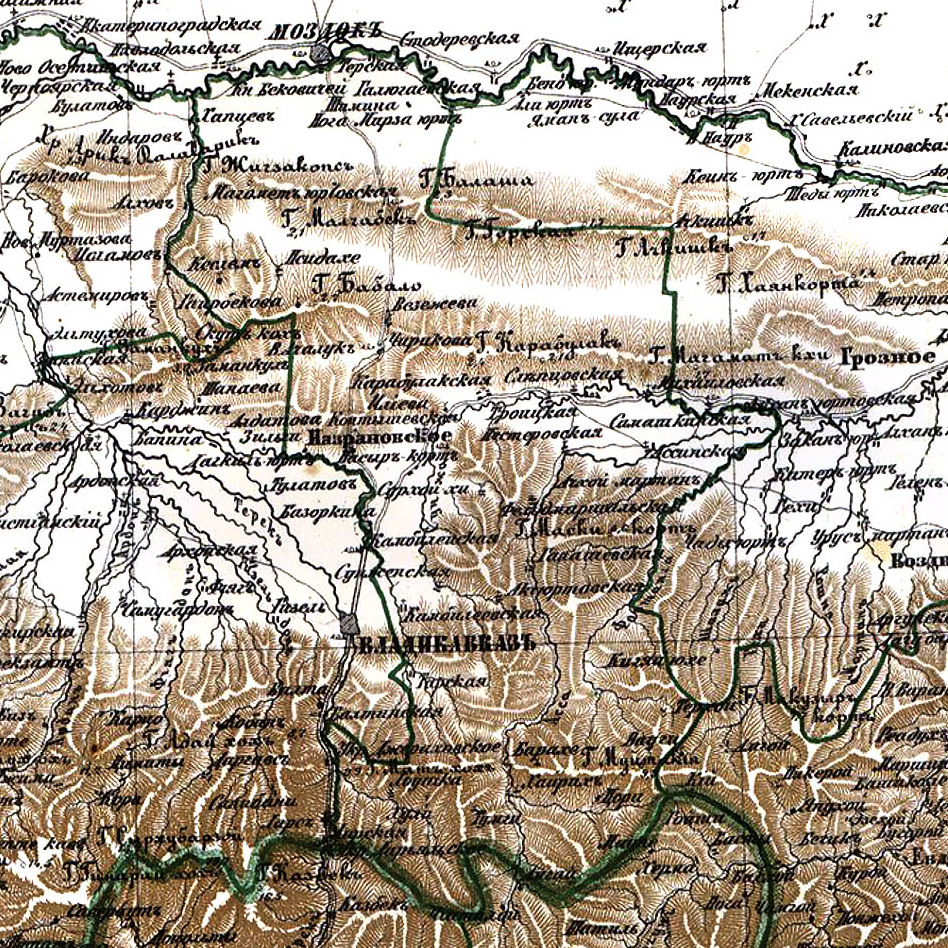
Ingushskiy Okrug on the map of the Caucasus region, 1869.

=== Background ===
Up until the 1860s, the mountaineers in the North Caucasus were subordinated to the military authorities of the Left (North-Eastern Caucasus) and Right (North-Western Caucasus) flanks of the Caucasian Line. Only in the Stavropol Governorate was there a civil administration.

=== Establishment ===
In 1862, Terek Oblast was divided into three districts (otdel), that is, Western, Middle and Eastern. To the former belonged the newly created Ingushskiy Okrug (also referred as the Voenno-Ingushskiy Okrug).

The administrative center of the Ingushskiy Okrug, together with the Ossetian Okrug, was Vladikavkaz. The Okrug consisted of three uchastoks: Nazranovskiy, Psedakhskiy, Gorsky and Karabulakskiy. Significant lands of the plain of Ingushetia in 1864-1865, after the construction of Cossack villages on them, were directly subordinated to the Terek Cossack Host. In 1866, the territory of the Meredzhin and Akkin societies was separated from the Gorskiy Uchastok of the Ingushskiy Okrug and subordinated to the administration of the Argunskiy Okrug. (Note: Due to them belonging to the same nation as the locals (Chechens) and geographically closer to the central governance of the Okrug.)

In 1865, after the resettlement of Karabulaks to Turkey, Karabulakskiy Uchastok was abolished and its lands were ceded to nearby Cossack stanitsas.

On February 2, 1870, a project was approved to establish an agricultural farm and school in the Ingush district.

In 1871, the Ingushskiy Okrug was disestablished when, together with the Cossack villages on the Sunzha, it was merged with the Ossetinskiy Okrug into one Vladikavkazsky Okrug.

== Administrative divisions ==
In administrative terms, initially in 1862 Ingushkiy Okrug was divided into 4 subcounties (uchastoks) and the lands of the villages on the Sunzha subordinate to the Terek Cossack army. However, in 1865 the number of sites was reduced to three. The subcounties of the Ingushskiy okrug were as follows:

Name	1868 population
Nazranovskiy Uchastok (Назрановскій участокъ)	17,339
Psedakhskiy Uchastok (Пседахскій участокъ)	6812
Gorskiy Uchastok (Горскій участокъ)	5763

Name	1865 population
Karabulakskiy Uchastok (Note: In 1865, the Karabulakskiy Uchastok of the Ingushskiy Okrug was liquidated, and its lands were divided between the Sunzha Cossacks and the Chechenskiy Okrug.) (Карабулакскій участокъ)	5201

- Settlements of Nazranovskiy Uchastok: Bazorkino, Kantyshevo, Surkhakhi, Ekazhevo, Nasyr-Kort, Alty, Gamurzievo, Bursuk, Plievo, Dolakovo, Upper Achaluki.
- Settlements of Psedakhskiy Uchastok: Sagopshi, Geirbek-Yurt, Psedakh, Keskem, Lower Keskem, Bekovichi, Guchuk-Yurt, Lower Achaluki, Middle Achaluki, Upper Achaluki.
- Settlements of Gorskiy Uchastok: Dzheyrakh, Pamyat, Armkhi, Lyazhgi, Tsori, Khamkhi, Tumgi, Khuli, Egikhal, Bisht, Doshkhakle, Kyazi, Shoan, Salgi, Metskhal, Garkh, Furtoug, Kusht, Koshk Morch, Eban, Kerbete, Kharp, Beyni, Olgeti, Tsoli, Niy, Pyaling, Targim, Barkhane, Barakh, Leimi, Kart, Ozdik, Nilkh, Pui, Tsorkh, Kyakhk, Ersh, Ezmi, Kost, Nyakist, Hani, Gadaborsh, Torsh, Tori, Khai, Koli, Myashkhi, Vovnushki, Tsyzdy, Gul. In 1866, the settlements of Akki and parts of the Meredzhi societies — Yalkhoroy, Akki, Vilah, Kerete, Galanchozh, Kerbychi, Orzmikale, Vauge — were separated from the Gorsky section of the Ingushsky Okrug and attached to the Argunskiy Okrug.
- Settlements of Karabulakskiy Uchastok: Botash-Yurt, Gazi-Yurt, Shinal-Yurt, Akhbarzoy, Arshty, Nesterovsky, Bamut, Chemulga, Mergist, Bereshki, Dattykh.

== Bibliography ==
=== Russian sources ===
- Ахмадов, Я. З.; Хасмагомадов, Э. Х. (2005). История Чечни в XIX—XX веках [History of Chechnya in the XIX-XX centuries] (in Russian). М.: Пульс. pp. 1–995. ISBN 5-93486-046-1.
- Албогачиева, М.С.-Г.; Мартазанов, А. М.; Соловьева, Л. Т., eds. (2013). Ингуши [The Ingush] (in Russian). Москва: Наука. pp. 1–512.
- Албогачиева, М. С.-Г. (2015). "Демаркация границ Ингушетии" [Demarcation of the borders of Ingushetia] (PDF). In Карпов, Ю. Ю. (ed.). Горы и границы: Этнография посттрадиционных обществ [Mountains and Borders: An Ethnography of Post-Traditional Societies] (in Russian). СПб.: МАЭ РАН. pp. 168–255. ISBN 978-5-88431-290-6.
- Арапов, Д. Ю.; Бабич, И. Л.; Бобровников, В. О.; Гаккаев, Дж.; Кажаров, В. Х.; Криштопа, А. Е.; Соловьева, Л. Т.; Сотавов, Н. А.; Цуциев, А. А. (2007). Бобровников, В. О.; Бабич, И. Л.; Редколлегия серии «Окраины Российской империи» (eds.). Северный Кавказ в составе Российской империи [North Caucasus as part of the Russian Empire]. Окраины Российской империи (in Russian). Москва: Новое литературное обозрение. pp. 1–460. ISBN 978-5867935290.
- Грабовскій, Н. Ф. (1870). "Экономическій и домашній бытъ жителей Горскаго участка Ингушевскаго округа" [Economic and domestic life of the inhabitants of the Gorsky Uchastok of the Ingushevskiy Okrug]. Сборникъ свѣдѣній о кавказскихъ горцахъ. Вып. 3 [Collection of information about the Caucasian highlanders. 3rd issue] (in Russian). Тифлис: Типографія Кавказскаго Горскаго Управленія. pp. 113–144.
- Долгиева, М. Б.; Картоев, М. М.; Кодзоев, Н. Д.; Матиев, Т. Х. (2013). Кодзоев, Н. Д. (ed.). История Ингушетии [History of Ingushetia] (4nd ed.). Ростов-на-Дону: Южный издательский дом. pp. 1–600. ISBN 978-5-98864-056-1.
- Дубровин, Н. Ф. (1871). Исторія войны и владычества русскихъ на Кавказѣ [The history of the war and domination of Russians in the Caucasus] (in Russian). Vol. 1: Book 1. СПб.: Типографія Департамента удѣлов. pp. 1–656.
- Картоев, М. М. (2020). Ингушетия в политике Российской империи на Кавказе. XIX век. Сборник документов и материалов [Ingushetia in the policy of the Russian Empire in the Caucasus. 19th century. Collection of documents and materials] (in Russian) (2 ed.). Ростов-на-Дону: Южный издательский дом. pp. 1–760. ISBN 978-5-98864-060-8.
- "Горская лѣтопись" [Mountain chronicle]. Сборник свѣдѣній о кавказскихъ горцахъ [Collection of information about the Caucasian highlanders] (in Russian). Тифлисъ: Типографія Главнаго Управленія Намѣстника Кавказскаго. 1868. pp. 1–72 (338–408 as PDF).
- Шнирельман, В. А. (2006). Калинин, И. (ed.). Быть Аланами: Интеллектуалы и политика на Северном Кавказе в XX веке [To be Alans: Intellectuals and Politics in the North Caucasus in the 20th Century] (in Russian). Москва: Новое Литературное Обозрение. pp. 1–348. ISBN 5-86793-406-3. ISSN 1813-6583.
- Цуциев, А. А. (1998). Осетино-ингушский конфликт (1992—...): его предыстория и факторы развития: историко-социологический очерк [Ossetian-Ingush conflict (1992–...): its prehistory and factors of development: a historical and sociological essay] (in Russian). Москва: Российская политическая энциклопедия.
