= Sunzhensky =

Sunzhensky (masculine), Sunzhenskaya (feminine), or Sunzhenskoye (neuter) may refer to:

- Sunzhensky District, name of several districts in Russia
- Sunzhensky otdel, former district of the Russian Empire
- Sunzhensky (inhabited locality) (Sunzhenskaya, Sunzhenskoye), name of several rural localities in Russia
