= Egi-Chozh =

Medieval castle complex

Egi-Chozh (Note: Russian: Эги-Чож; Ingush: Эг-Чӏож, romanized: Eg-Ch’ozh; Chechen: Иег-Чӏаж, romanized: Ieg-Ç̇aƶ) is a ingush medieval castle complex.

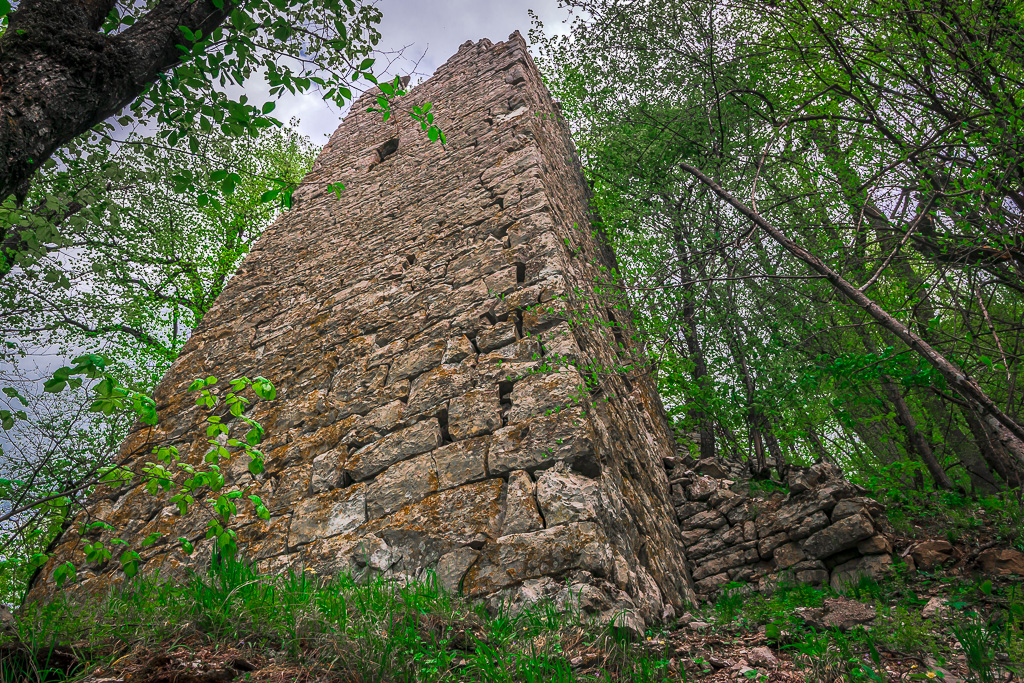
Part of the complex

== History ==
The Egi-Chozh complex is located in the narrowest section of the gorge of Fortanga on the ridges of rocky branches of mountain ranges on both sides of the river. The choosing of the site was not accidental as it made the complex able to completely block the passage through the gorge.

Four towers are located on the right bank of Fortanga and two are located on the left. The complex is also located near Dattykh, Ingushetia, Russia.

In 1978, Egi-Chozh was studied by Dautova Rezeda. Previously it wasn't properly studied.

== Sources ==
- Dautova, Rezeda; Kalinkin, Viktor; Chahkiev, Djabrail (1979). Rybakov, Boris; et al. (eds.). "Новые позднесредневековые памятники Чечено-Ингушетии" [New late medieval monuments of Checheno-Ingushetia]. Археологические открытия 1978 года (in Russian). Moscow: Nauka. pp. 122–123.
- Dautova, Rezeda (1984). "Башенные комплексы урочища Эги-Чож" [Tower complexes of the Egi-Chozh tract]. In Vinogradov, Vitaly; Muzhukhoev, Maksharip; et al. (eds.). Поселения и жилища народов Чечено-Ингушетии [Settlements and dwellings of the peoples of Checheno-Ingushetia] (in Russian). Grozny: Checheno-Ingush Institute of History, Sociology and Philology. pp. 36–67.
- Shavkhelishvili, Abram (1963). Anchabadze, Zurab (ed.). Из истории взаимоотношений между грузинскими и чечено-ингушскими народами (С древнейших времён до XV века) [From the history of relations between the Georgian and Chechen-Ingush peoples (From ancient times to the 15th century)]. К истории народов Чечено-Ингушетии (in Russian). Grozny: Checheno-Ingush Book Publishing House. pp. 1–128.
- Umarov, Serazhdin (1970). Средневековая материальная культура горной Чечни XIII—XVII вв [Medieval material culture of mountainous Chechnya of the XIII-XVII centuries] (in Russian). Moscow: Institute of Archeology of the Academy of Sciences of USSR. pp. 1–23.
