= Apti Bisultanov =

Chechen writer

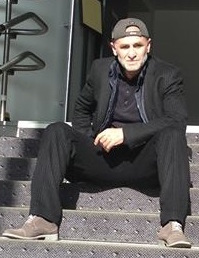
- Born: September 1, 1959 (age 67); Urus-Martanovsky District, Checheno-Ingush Autonomous Soviet Socialist Republic
- Citizenship: Russia
- Occupation: poet
- Writing career
- Language: chechen language
- Years active: from 1983 to the present
- Genres: verse; narrative poetry

Apti Bisultanov (born 1953 in Goychu) is a Chechen prominent poet of the Chechen Republic. Apti Bisultanov studied philology and worked as a senior lecturer, an editor, a publisher, the Vice-Premier. He was also a guerrilla fighter. For the poem «In Hajbahe written», devoted to victims of Stalin deportation of Chechens, he received the National award (1992). Since 2002 Apti Bisultanov lives in Berlin. He took part in the International literary festival, and receiver a scholarship of Fund of Culture. In 2003 in Rotterdam he received Award of fund Poets of all Nations and N (o) Vib-Verlag.

== Biography ==
Apti Bisultanov was born in 1959 in the village of Goy-Chu in the Urus-Martan district of Chechnya. In 1983 he graduated from the philological faculty of Chechen State University, after which he continued to work as a teacher at the university for a year. Then he began literary activity. From 1982 to 1984 he worked in the Chechen children's magazine "Stelagad" (Chech. Rainbow). In 1986, he published his first book of poems “Noh - Tse - Cho” (“Plow - Fire - House”) (the name of the collection is consonant with the word “Nokhchich”, which means “country of Chechens”). In 1988, Bisultanov became editor of the Chechen book publishing house in Grozny.

For his poem “Written in Khaibakh” (included in the collection “Tkesan IindagI”), dedicated to the victims of deportation, in 1992 received the National Prize of the Republic of Ichkeria.

In 1999, he was appointed Minister of Social Protection in the Government of Ichkeria.

Since the fall of 2002, lives in Berlin. He took part in the International Literary Festival, was a scholarship holder of the Culture Fund. In 2003 in Rotterdam he received the Poets of all Nations Prize. In 2005, he worked at the Max Planck Institute in Leipzig. In 2006 he was awarded the honorary title of "Writer of the City of Rainsberg." Many of his poems are put to music and translated into Russian, German, Turkish and Finnish. Apti Bisultanov is a member of the international PEN club and an honorary member of the Russian-Finnish PEN club. He is currently a scholarship holder for the Heinrich-Böll-Haus in Langenbroich.

== Bibliography ==
- Plough-fire-house (1986)
- One legend (1988)
- Lightning shade (1991)
