= Gandalbos =

Rural locality in Ingushetia

Gandalbos Гандалбос
- Selo

Other transcription(s)
  - Ingush: ГӀандал-Босе
- Interactive map of Gandalbos
- Location of Gandalbos Gandalbos (Republic of Ingushetia)
- Coordinates: 43°03′54″N 45°08′33″E
- Country: Russia
- Federal subject: Ingushetia

Government
  - Head: Khairov Bakhit Khasanovich

Population (2010 Census)
  - Total: 0
  - Estimate (2021) (Note: In "Register of registered in AGKGN geographical names of objects as of 12/17/2021", Gandalbos is indicated with households.): 0 )

Administrative status
  - Subordinated to: Sunzhensky District

Gandalbos (Ingush: ГӀандал-Босе, romanized: Ghandal-Bose) is rural locality (a selo) in Sunzhensky District of the Republic of Ingushetia, Russia, located on the left bank of the river Fortanga. It is part of the municipality of the rural settlement of Dattykh.

== Etymology ==
The name Gandalbos comes from the Ingush language and is a combination of Gandal (a proper noun) and bos (hillside), literally translates as the hillside of Gandal.

== History ==
Gandalbos is an ancient ancestral village of the Gandaloy clan (teip).

On January 6, 1851, in order to punish the highlanders for their insolence, General Sleptsov gathered a detachment and under the command of Lieutenant Colonel Mezentsev made a punitive expedition on Dattykh and Gandalbos, which has long been known as the nest of the most courageous robbers. The punitive expedition ended successfully for the Russian Empire and the detachment continued cutting down forests.

Since 1926, Gandalbos was part of the Galashkinsky District of the Ingush Autonomous Oblast. The Ingush lived in the village (according to the 1926 census). The population of the village as of 1988 was about 10 people. As of 1995, Gandalbos was still marked on maps as a residential settlement. The village was abandoned by the inhabitants, probably in the second half of the 1990s, or in the 2000s.

In 2021, on the territory of the village of Dattykh, work began on laying an asphalt road.

== Geography ==
Gandalbos is located on the left bank of the Fortanga river, at the foot of the Azhduk mountain range. The nearest settlements: in the north - the village of Arshty, in the southwest (upstream of the Fortanga) - the village of Dattykh, in the northeast (downstream of the Fortanga) - the village of Bamut.

== Bibliography ==
- Кодзоев, Н. Д.; Киева, З. Х. (2021). Накостхоев, Х. А.; Хайрова, Р. Р. (eds.). Ономастикон Ингушетии [Onomasticon of Ingushetia] (in Russian). Москва: ТПК «Центробланк». pp. 1–121. ISBN 978-5-91303-022-1.
- Общенациональная Комиссия по рассмотрению вопросов, связанных с определением территории и границ Ингушетии (2021). Всемирный конгресс ингушского народа (ed.). Доклад о границах и территории Ингушетии (общие положения) [Report on the borders and territory of Ingushetia (general provisions)] (archival documents, maps, illustrations) (in Russian). Назрань. pp. 1–175.
- "Реестр зарегистрированных в АГКГН географических названий объектов на 17.12.2021: Республика Ингушетия" [Register of registered in AGKGN geographical names of objects as of 12/17/2021: Republic of Ingushetia] (in Russian).
