= Yalkharoy =

Rural locality in Chechnya

Yalkharoy Ялхорой
- Selo

Other transcription(s)
  - Chechen: Яхлара
  - Ingush: Ялхаре
- Interactive map of Yalkharoy
- Location of Yalkharoy Yalkharoy (Chechnya)
- Coordinates: 42°55′13″N 45°16′28″E
- Country: Russia
- Federal subject: Chechnya

Population (2010 Census)
  - Total: 0
  - Estimate (2021): 0 )

Administrative status
  - Subordinated to: Urus-Martanovsky District

Yalkharoy (Note: • Russian: Ялхарой. • Chechen: Ялхара, romanized: Yalkhara; Хьевхьарача-Ялхара, romanized: Hevharacha-Yalkhara. • Ingush: Ялхаре, romanized: Yalkhare) is a rural locality (a selo) in Urus-Martanovsky District of the Republic of Chechnya, Russia.

== Location ==
Map of Urus-Martanovsky District with Shalazhi rural settlement highlighted. Yalkhara is in the south

Yalkhara is located in the center of Galanchozhsky District. It is located 4 kilometres (2.5 mi) north-west of Aka-Bass and 56 kilometres (35 mi) south-west of Grozny.

The closest settlements to Yalkhara are Tsecha-Äkhk in the west, Aka-Bass in the south, and Khaybakha in the south-east.

== History ==
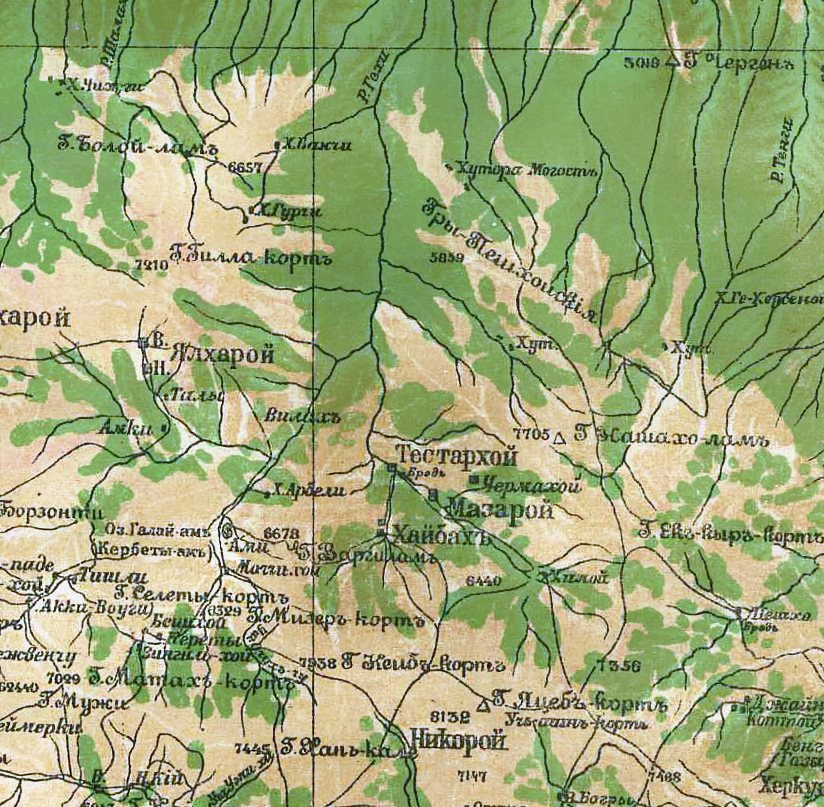
Auls of Nashkhoy

Yalkharoy is the ancestral home of the Yalkharoy teip.

In the second half of the 18th century (1770s), the German researcher J. A. Güldenstädt mentioned the village of Yalkharoy as part of the district of "Sholkha" which according to him was called "Little Angusht" by the Russians due to its proximity to Angusht proper. Yalkharoy among the villages of the Ingush in 1823 was also mentioned by S. M. Bronevskiy.

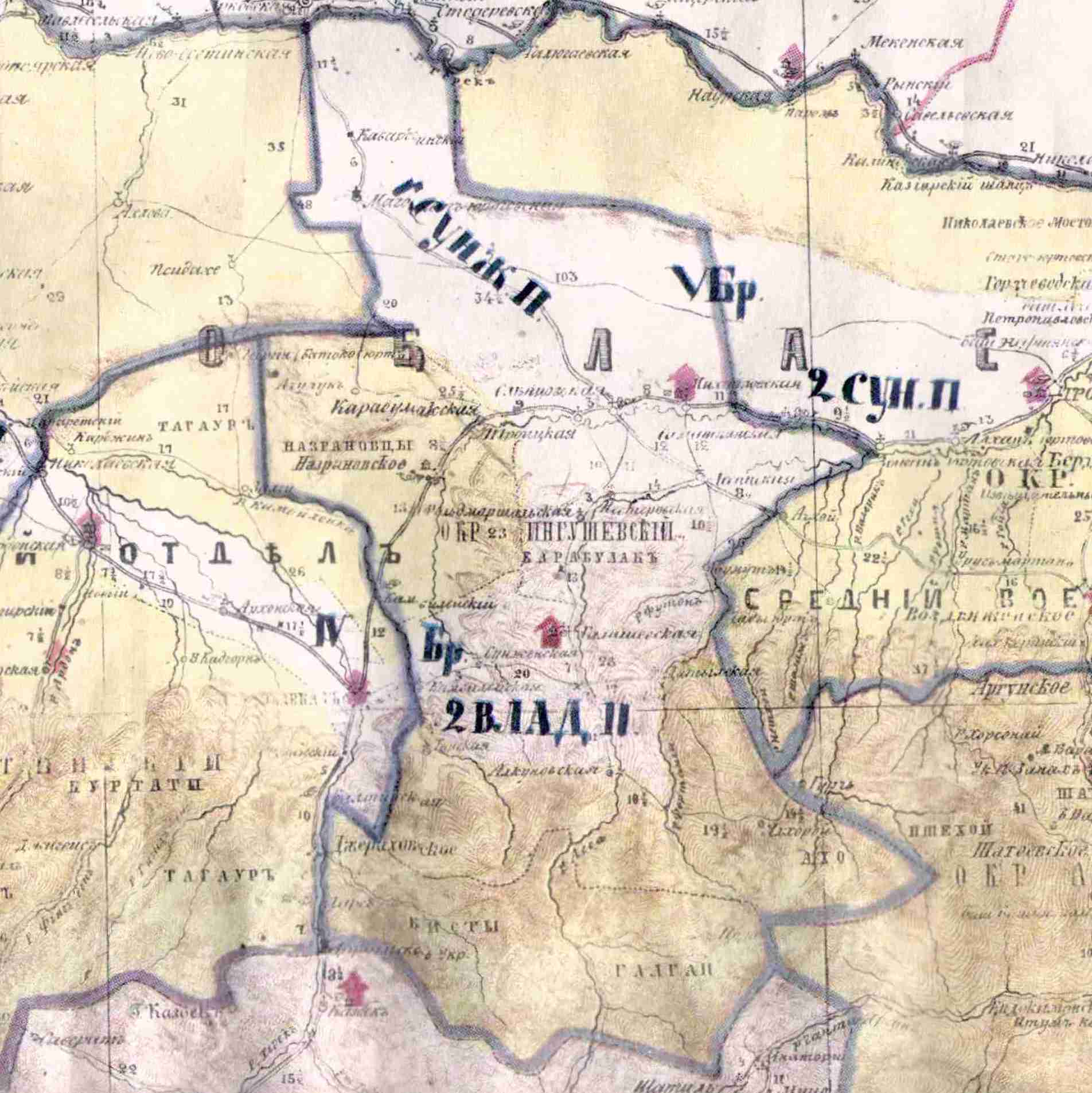
The village Yalkharoy on the map of the Ingush district in 1853.

According to the Regulations on the management of the Terek Oblast in 1862, the Ingushskiy Okrug was established as part of the Western Department. It included societies of Nazranians, Karabulaks, Galgai, Kistins, Akkins and Tsorins (also Meredzhin society and some Galanchozh and Yalkharoy auls). The village of Yalkharoy was part of the Gorsky section of the Ingush district. In 1866 the village of Yalkharoy (Meredzhi society, some Galanchozh, Yalkharoy auls and Akkin society) was ceded to the Argunskiy Okrug due to them belonging to the same nation as the locals (Chechen) and geographically closer to the central governance of the Okrug.

From 1940 to 1944, Yalkhara was the administrative center of Galanchozhsky District. On 27 February 1944, after the genocide and deportation of the Chechen and Ingush people and the Chechen-Ingush ASSR was abolished, the village of Yalkhara was abandoned and destroyed.

In 1957, after the Vaynakh people returned and the Chechen-Ingush ASSR was restored, the former residents of Galanchozhsky District were forbidden to resettle there. As a result, most former residents of Yalkhara resettled in the flat lands of the republic, mostly in the Achkhoy-Martanovsky, Groznensky and Sernovodsky districts.

In 2019, Yalkhara was named as one of the first 7 settlements in Galanchozhsky District to be rebuilt in order to resettle the area.

== Demographics ==
National censuses done by the Russian empire and the Soviet Union in 1874,1883,1891, 1914 and 1926 showed that all of the inhabitants of Yalkharoy and its surrounding villages were ethnic Chechens in all 5 censuses.

== Notable people ==
- Dzhokhar Dudayev, major general of Soviet Air Force and the first president of Chechen Republic of Ichkeria.

== Bibliography ==
- Гюльденштедт, Иоганн Антон (2002). VI. Провинция Кистия, или Кистетия // Путешествие по Кавказу в 1770-1773 гг [Province of Kistia, or Kistetia // Journey through the Caucasus in 1770-1773] (in Russian). Санкт-Петербург: Петербургское Востоковедение. pp. 238–243.
- Дахкильгов, И. А. (1977). Вайнаьха багахбувцам [Folklore of Vainakhs] (in Ingush). Грозный: Нохч-ГӀалгӀай Паччахьалкхен Университет. pp. 1–218.
- Броневский, С. М. (1823). Кисты (глава третья) // Новейшие географические и исторические известия о Кавказе (часть вторая) [Kists (chapter three) // The latest geographical and historical news about the Caucasus (part two)] (PDF) (in Russian). Москва: Типография С. Селивановского. pp. 151–186.
- Ингушетия в политике Российской империи на Кавказе. XIX век. Сборник документов и материалов (in Russian). Ростов-на-Дону: Южный издательский дом. 2020. pp. 1–760. ISBN 978-5-98864-060-8.
- Воронов, Н. И.; Кавказский отдел Императорского русского географического общества (1869). "Список горских аулов Кубанской и Терской областей" [List of mountain villages of the Kuban and Terek Oblasts]. Сборник статистических сведений о Кавказе [Collection of statistical information about the Caucasus] (in Russian). Тифлис: Типографія Главнаго управленіи намѣстника Кавказскаго; типогрфія Меликова и К. pp. 41–52 (418–429 as PDF).
- Танкиев, А. Х. (1991). Дахкильгов, И. А. (ed.). ГӀалгӀай фольклор [Ingush folklore] (in Ingush). Грозный: Книга. pp. 1–448. ISBN 5-7666-0186-7.
