= Galanchozhsky District =

Coordinates: 42°52′53″N 45°18′00″E

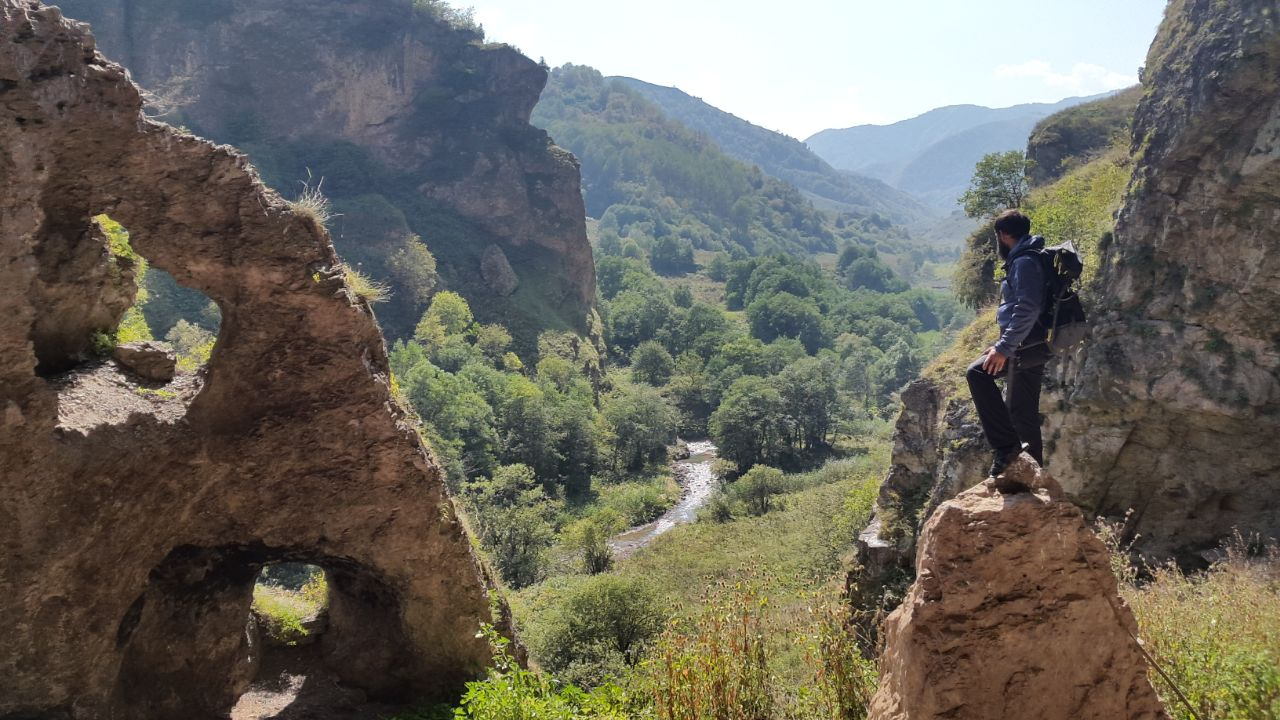
Grotto burials in the area of Mindar

Galanchozhsky District (Chechen: Галайн-ЧӀажин кӀошт), (Russian: Галанчожский район) is a district (raion) of Chechnya. The district was recreated in 2012. However, the official restoration process of the district is not complete. The district also existed between 1925 and 1944. The administrative center is the village of Aka-Bass (Chechen: Акха-Басс).

== Location ==
Location of Galanchozhsky District, Chechnya (1925-1944)

Outline map of Galanchozhsky District (2018-present)

Galanchozhsky District is located in the south-west of Chechnya. It shares borders with Achkhoy-Martanovsky District in the north, Urus-Martanovsky District in the north-east, Shatoysky District in the east, Itum-Kalinsky District in the south-east, Georgia to the south, and Ingushetia to the west.

== History ==
In 1925, Galanchozhsky District was first formed, as a part of the Chechen Autonomous Oblast, where it existed until 1929. It was restored in 1935, as a part of the Chechen-Ingush ASSR. On 23 February 1944, the district was abandoned after the deportation of Vaynakhs. The district was then disbanded and its territory became part of the Achkhoy-Martanovsky, Itum-Kalinsky and Sunzhensky districts.

On 9 January 1957, the Chechen-Ingush ASSR was restored. However, former residents of Galanchozhsky District were forbidden from returning to the area. The reason for this remains unclear. The district itself was not restored at this time.

In 1992, the district was again restored by the government of the self-proclaimed Chechen Republic of Ichkeria in its pre-1944 borders. However, it was once again disbanded in 1997 and the district borders returned to those from pre-1992.

In 2012, Galanchozhsky District was recreated. In 2014, the district was restored for a third time, under the constitution of the Chechen Republic.

== Population ==
The population of the district according to the 1939 census was 9,499 people. This included Chechens (the majority at 95.7%), Russians (2.8%), Ingush (0.5%), and Ukrainians (0.4%), as well as other minority groups. The district has been abandoned since 1944.

== Administrative divisions ==
Before 1944, Galanchozhsky District was one of the largest and most densely populated districts in the Chechen-Ingush ASSR. About 140 villages existed in the district, all a part of one of the 12 village councils (selsoviets). The administrative center of each selsoviet is included in parentheses.

- Akkiysky (Äkka)
- Baloysky (Bala)
- Bauloysky (Bavla)
- Galanchozhsky (Aka-Bass)
- Khaibakhsky (Khaybakha)
- Kiysky (Yordi-Chu)
- Melkhestinsky (Meshiekh)
- Meredzhoysky (Merzha)
- Nashkhoysky (Mogusta)
- Peshkhoysky (Peshkha)
- Terloysky (Nikara)
- Yalkhoroysky (Yalkhara)

In February 1944, when the district was disbanded, its territory became a part of:

- Achkhoy-Martanovsky District: Akkiysky, Baloysky, Galanchozhsky, Khaybakhsky, Nashkhoysky, Peshkhoysky, Yalkhoroysky village councils
- Itum-Kalinsky District: Bauloysky, Kiysky, Melkhestinsky, Terloysky village councils
- Sunzhensky District: Meredzhoysky village council

== Cultural monuments ==
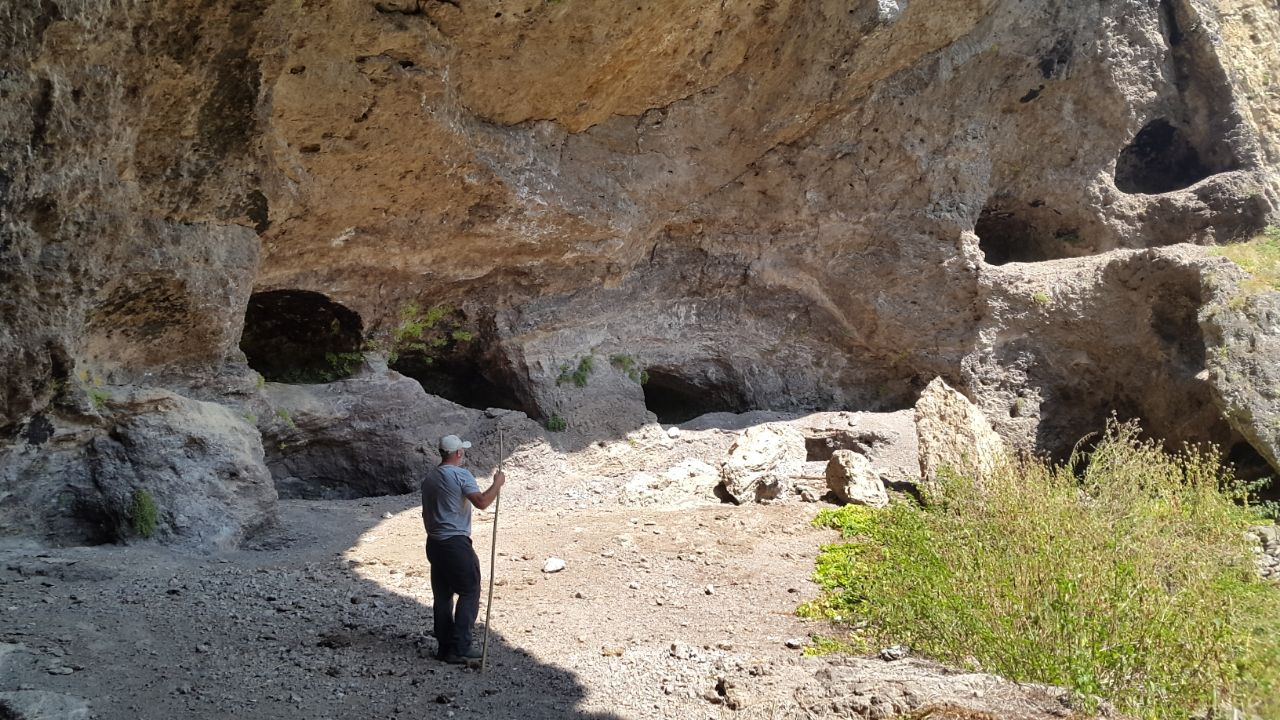
Grotto burials in the area of Mindar

Galanchozhsky District is one of the ancient historical Chechen districts, from which, according to legend, the indigenous clans (teips) emerged, who later formed the united Chechen people.

In the territory of the district, there are monuments dating back to the early and late Middle Ages. Each of these represent historical and spiritual value for the Chechen people - they include ancient combat and residential towers, castles and, especially important to the Chechen people, Lake Galanchozh and Mount Yerdi-Kort.

== District restoration process ==
It was announced in late 2018 by Ramzan Kadyrov, that major development projects would begin in Galanchozhsky District in 2019. Road construction began in the district in early 2019, and on 21 March of the same year, plans were revealed to reconstruct seven former villages in the district, including Aka-Bass, Yalkhara, Äkka, Khaybakha, Charmakha, Tsecha-Äkhk, and Merzha.
