= Khaybakha =

Village in Galanchozhsky District, Chechnya

Coordinates: 42°52′38″N 45°21′28″E

Khaybakha (Chechen: Хьайбаха; Russian: Хайбах), also spelled Khaibakha or Khaibakh, is a planned village in Galanchozhsky District, Chechnya near an abandoned aul with the same name, Khaybakha or Khaybakhoy (Russian: Хайбахой).

== Administrative and municipal status ==
Municipally, Khaybakha is incorporated into Gekhi-Chuyskoye rural settlement. It is one of the three settlements included in it.

Until 31 December 2019, Aka-Bass was included in Achkhoy-Martanovsky District, but on 1 January 2020 - was transferred to the control of Urus-Martanovsky District.

At the same time, Khaybakha is a part of Galanchozhsky District. Until 1944, it was the administrative center of the Khaybakhoyskoye rural settlement of that district.

== Geography ==
Map of Urus-Martanovsky District with Gekhi-Chu rural settlement highlighted. Khaybakha is in the south

Khaybakha is located in the center of Galanchozhsky District, on the left bank of the Gekhi River. It is located 5 kilometres (3.1 mi) east of Aka-Bass and 56 kilometres (35 mi) south-west of Grozny.

The nearest settlements to Khaybakha are Yalkhara in the north-west, Aka-Bass in the west, and Charmakha in the east.

== History ==
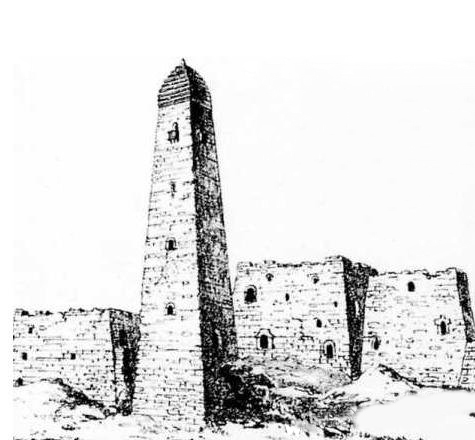
The battle tower in Khaybakha, 1888.

On the doorway of the battle tower in the village, there is a petroglyph in the form of a human hand, palm down.

In 1990, there was a plan to build a large memorial to the massacre at the site of Khaybakha, with a special fund set up to raise money. However, this was disrupted by the First and Second Chechen Wars, and the memorial was never built. In 2019, it was announced that the memorial would be built.

In 2008, Ramzan Kadyrov described author Stepan Kashurka as a "hero", who "wrote in his book the truth about the tragic fate of the mountain village of Khaybakha". As a result, 200,000 rubles were set aside in the Akhmat Kadyrov fund to build a monument to Kashurka.

In 2019, Khaybakha was named as one of the first 7 settlements in Galanchozhsky District to be rebuilt in order to resettle the area.

=== Khaybakh Massacre ===
On 27 February 1944, the residents of the village of Khaybakha fell victim to the genocide and deportation of the Chechen and Ingush people by Soviet troops. However, unusually, extremely heavy snow had fallen the night before in Khaibakha and nearby auls. As a result, the Soviet troops told residents in Khaybakha and all other villages in Nashkha to go to the stable in Khaybakha while an alternative transport route was set up for them. However, the stable, full of straw, was locked when more than 700 people, who could not descend from the mountains, were inside. The stable was then set ablaze, with anyone who escaped the burning structure being shot. The village has since become notorious for the massacre.

The massacre in Khaybakha was depicted in the film "Ordered to Forget". However, this film was banned in Russia due to "insufficient evidence" to prove that the massacre, an event that is denied by the Russian government, ever happened.

== Ruins ==
As of 2020, there are several standing buildings in Khaybakha; the battle tower, two residential towers, and a newly constructed mosque. However, due to Russian military exercises in the area around Khaibakha between 2005 and 2007, the battle tower was partially destroyed. As a result, only the lower half of the structure remained standing, until it was fully restored in November 2019. The foundations of most former houses also remain in the village, as well as two Muslim cemeteries.
