= Sunzhensky (inhabited locality) =

Sunzhensky (Russian: Су́нженский; masculine), Sunzhenskaya (Су́нженская; feminine), or Sunzhenskoye (Су́нженское; neuter) is the name of several rural localities in Russia:

- Sunzhensky (rural locality), a khutor in Stepnovsky District of Stavropol Krai
- Sunzhenskaya, a stanitsa in Kochubeyevsky District of Stavropol Krai
