= Fortanga =

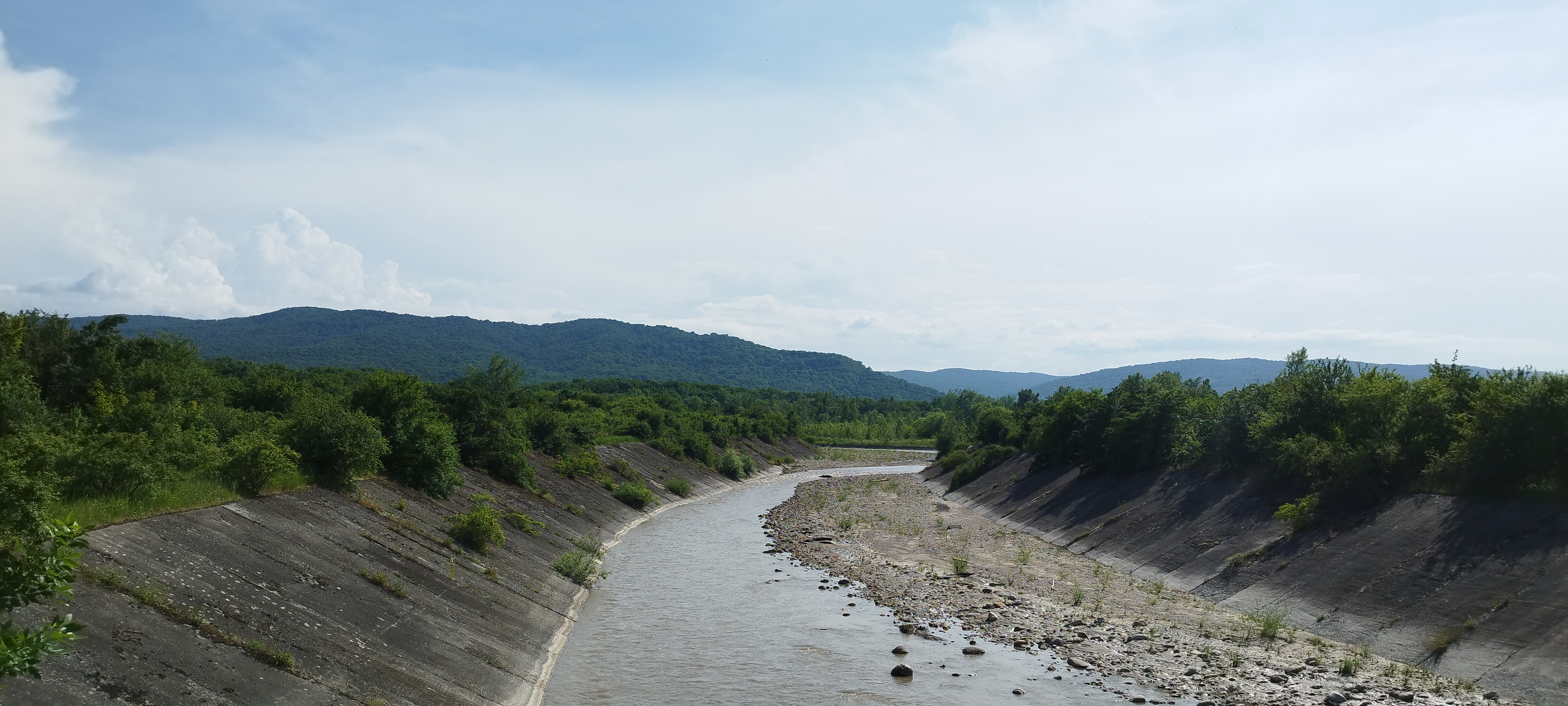

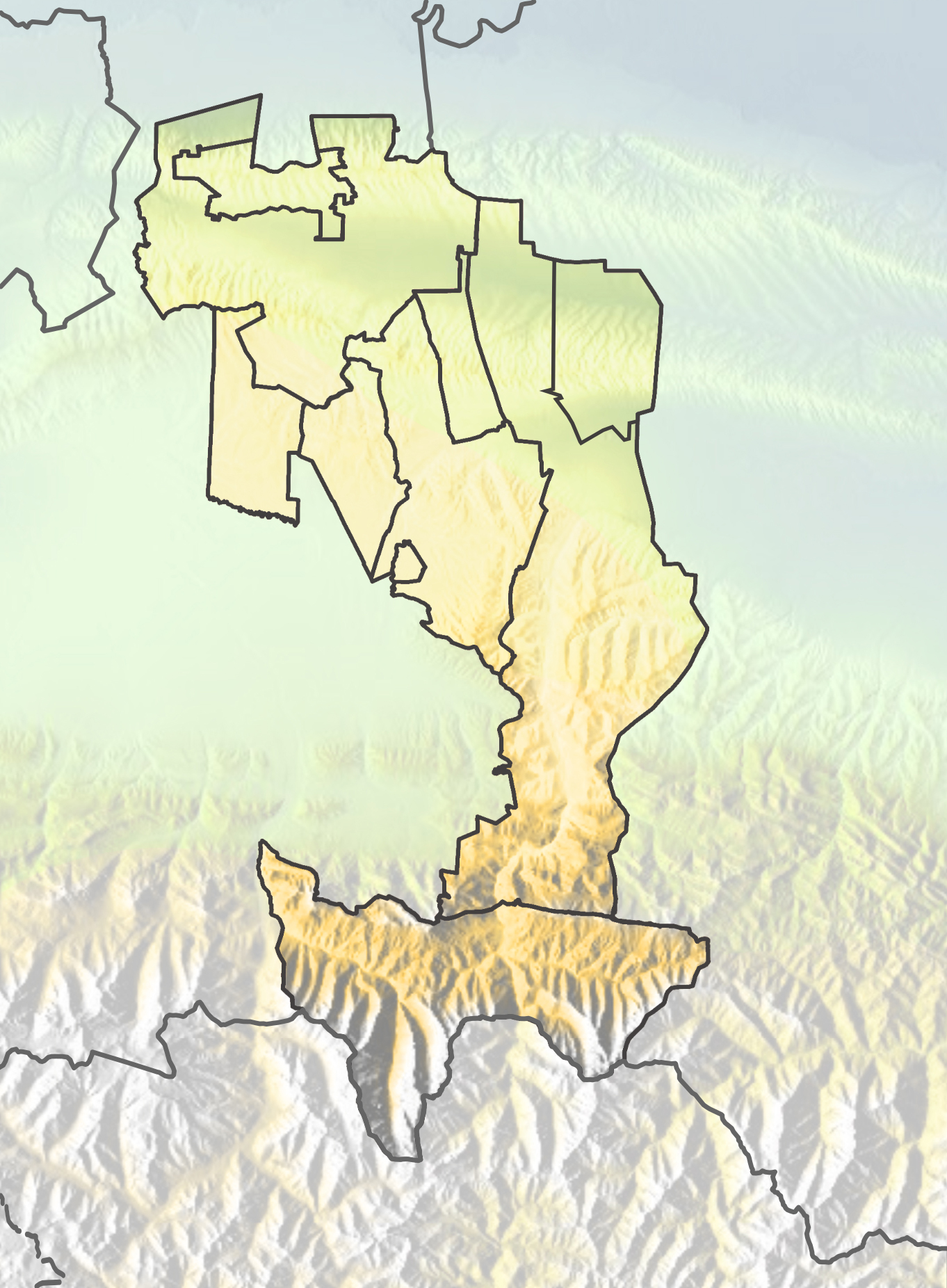
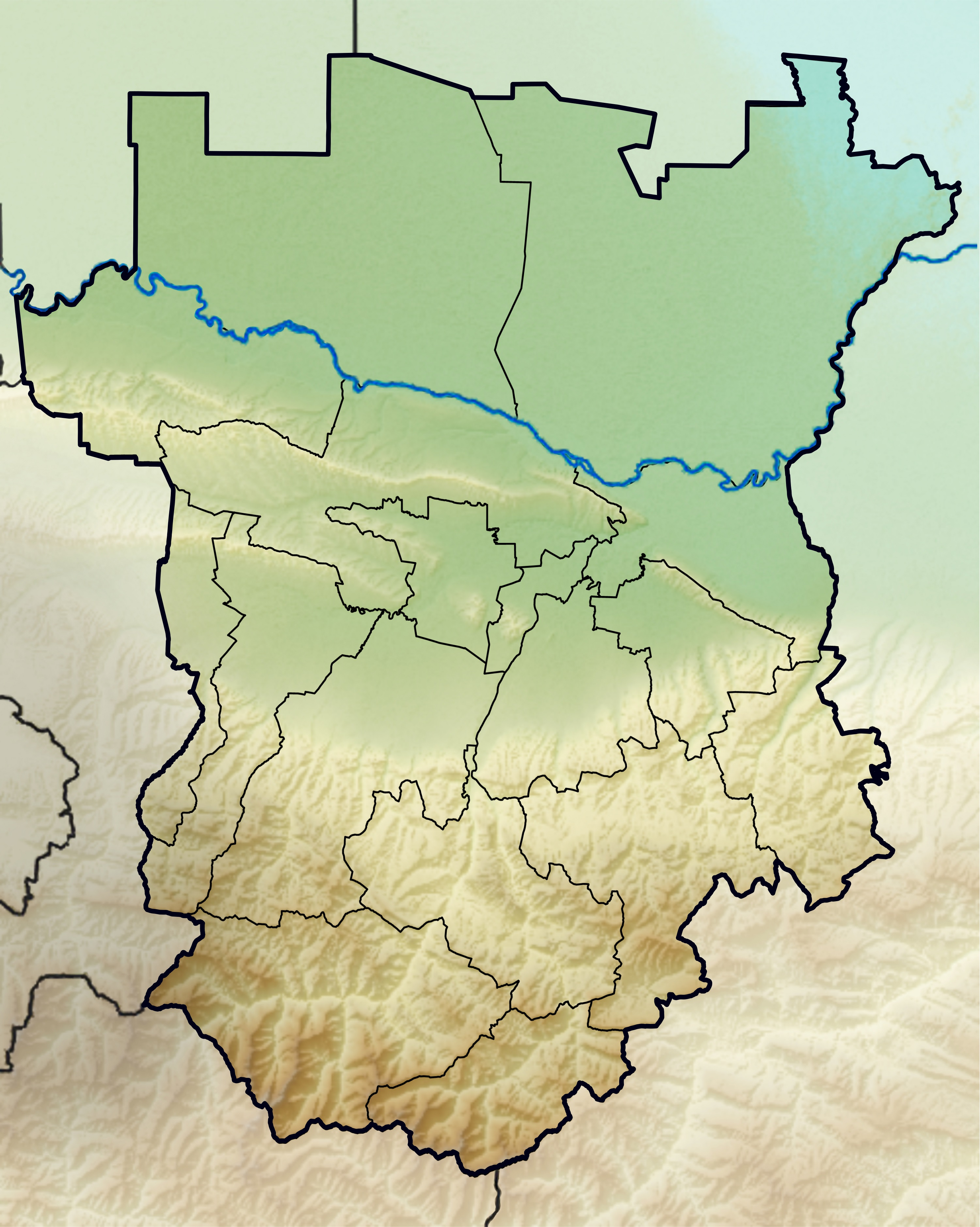
- Location within Caucasus Mountains Location within Republic of Ingushetia Location within Chechnya
- Native name: Forta (Ingush); Marta (Chechen)

Location
- Country: Russia
- Republic: Ingushetia
- Republic: Chechnya

Physical characteristics
- Source
  - coordinates: 42°51′50″N 45°01′29″E
- Mouth: Assa
  - location: 7,5 km along the right bank of the Assa river
  - coordinates: 43°14′36″N 45°23′31″E
- Basin size: 526 km^{2} (203 mi^{2})

Fortanga (Ingush: Форта/Фарта, romanized: Forta/Farta; Chechen: Марта, romanized: Marta) historically sometimes referred to as Balsu, is a river in North Caucasus that flows in Ingushetia and Chechnya. The length of the river is 69 km, the basin area is 526 km^{2}.

== Geography ==
The river originates near the border of Chechnya and Ingushetia on the northern slope of the Tsoreylam (Khaylam) ridge. In the upper course it is called Martanka. Flows to the northeast. The mouth of the river is located near the village of Shaami-Yurt, 7.5 km along the right bank of the Assa River.

Settlements standing in the Fortanga river basin: Khay, Khayara, Tsechakhki, Singalhi, Gand-Alie, Phumatiye, Katargashtiye, Mulkaniye, Muzhak, Mashtie, Mazanty, Dekashari, Gozuni, Meredzhi, Dakih, Khaykhara, Gerety, Dalg-Bukh, Dak-Bukh, Egichozh, Egiboss, Dattykh, Belkhara, Gandalbos, Arshty, Izdig, Futtunchie, Akati, Bereshki, Samiogochie, Mergyiste, Bamut, Achkhoy-Martan, Shaami-Yurt.

== Bibliography ==
- Сулейманов, А. С. (1978). Шайхиев, А. Х. (ed.). Топонимия Чечено-Ингушетии. Часть 2. Горная Ингушетия (юго-запад) и Чечня (центр и юго-восток) [Toponymy of Checheno-Ingushetia. Part 2. Mountainous Ingushetia (southwest) and Chechnya (center and southeast)] (in Russian). Грозный: Чечено-Ингушское Книжное Издательство. pp. 1–233.
- Барахоева, Н. М.; Кодзоев, Н. Д.; Хайров, Б. А. (2016). Ингушско-русский словарь терминов [Ingush-Russian dictionary of terms] (in Ingush and Russian) (2 ed.). Нальчик: ООО «Тетраграф». pp. 1–288.
- Кодзоев, Н. Д. (2021). Хайрова, Р. Р. (ed.). Русско-ингушский словарь [Russian-Ingush dictionary] (in Ingush and Russian). Ростов-на-Дону. pp. 1–656. ISBN 978-5-906785-55-8.
- Мальсагов, З. К. (1963). Оздоева, Ф. (ed.). Грамматика ингушского языка [Grammar of the Ingush language] (in Ingush and Russian). Vol. 5 (2nd ed.). Грозный: Чечено-Ингушское Книжное Издательство. pp. 1–164.
