= Sleptsov =

Sleptsov (feminine: Sleptsova) is a Russian-language surname derived from the nickname slepets, "blind man". The surname may refer to:

- Vasily Sleptsov (1836-1878), Russian writer
- Yuri Sleptsov, former mayor of Voskresensk, Moscow Oblast, Russia
- Platon Alekseevich Sleptsov, better known as Platon Oyunsky, Soviet Yakut statesman, writer and translator, seen as one of the founders of modern Yakut literature
- Svetlana Sleptsova, Russian biathlete
