= Sunzhensky District =

Location of the Chechen Republic in Russia

Location of the Republic of Ingushetia in Russia

Sunzhunsky District is the name of several administrative and municipal districts in Russia:

- Sunzhensky District, Chechen Republic, an administrative and municipal district of the Chechen Republic
- Sunzhensky District, Republic of Ingushetia, an administrative and municipal district of the Republic of Ingushetia
- Sunzhensky otdel, a former district of the Russian Empire

== See also ==
- Sunzhensky (disambiguation)
