= Eban, Dzheyrakhsky District =

Human settlement in Dzheyrakhsky District, Republic of Ingushetia, Russia

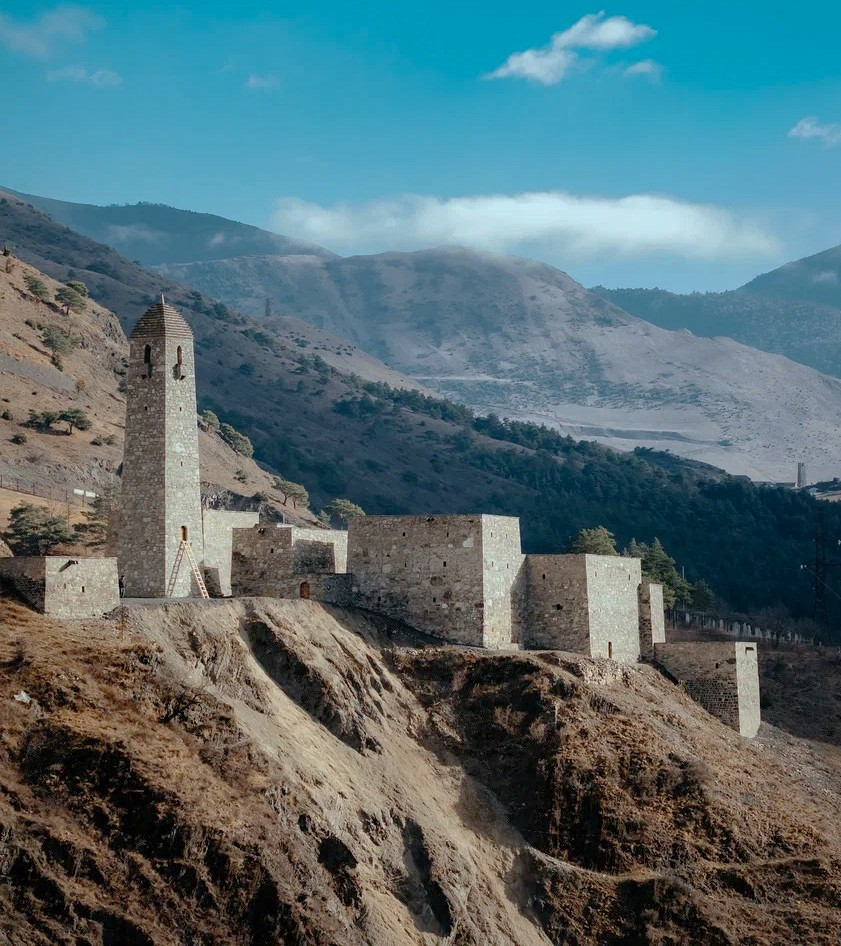
- Interactive map of Eban, Dzheyrakhsky District
- Location of Eban, Dzheyrakhsky District
- Coordinates: 42°49′04″N 44°41′52″E
- Country: Russia
- Federal subject: Ingushetia
- Founded: 1615

Population
  - Estimate (2010): 0 )
- Time zone: UTC+3 (MSK)
- Postal code: 386430
- OKTMO ID: 26620440121

Eban (Russian: Эбан; Ingush: Эбана, Обин, romanized: Ebana, Obin) is a small village in the Dzheyrakhsky district of Ingushetia, Russia. It is known for its ancestral association with the teip Obankhoy. The village is situated on the steep right bank of the Armkhi River, near the Georgian Military Highway, and is known for its tower-style houses. The name Eban is thought to have originated from a proper noun, although the exact etymology is obscured. As of 2017, the village does not have any streets or alleys, but according to the 1926 census, there were more than 30 Obankhoy people living in the area.

== Geography ==
Eban is located in the Caucasus Mountains, in the Dzheyrakhsky district of Ingushetia, Russia. The village is situated on the steep right bank of the Armkhi River, near the Georgian Military Highway. It is known for its ancestral association with the teip Obankhoy and its tower-style houses.

The village is also the site of a castle complex, which consists of the remains of residential towers, battle towers, and a manor house. The castle is located on the slopes of the mountain and is in poor condition, requiring restoration.

Eban is said to have a rich cultural history, as evidenced by the legends and traditions associated with the village. According to one legend, a boy who survived the destruction of Eban was taken in and raised by a woman in another village. When he grew up, he returned to Eban and became a symbol of resilience and tenacity for the Obankhoevites.
