= Galanchozh =

Rural locality in Chechnya

Galanchozh Галанчож
- Selo

Other transcription(s)
  - Chechen: ГалайнчIаж
  - ingush: Галайчlож
- Interactive map of Galanchozh
- Location of Galanchozh Galanchozh (Chechnya)
- Coordinates: 42°52′04″N 45°18′37″E
- Country: Russia
- Federal subject: Chechnya
- Elevation: 1,500 m (4,900 ft)

Population (2010 Census)
  - Total: 0
  - Estimate (2021): 0 )

Administrative status
  - Subordinated to: Urus-Martanovsky District

Galanchozh, (Note: • Russian: Галанчож, romanized: Galanchozh • Chechen: ГалайнчIаж, romanized: Galaynchazh) formerly Akhbosoy, (Note: • Russian: Ахбосой, romanized: Akhbosoy • Chechen: Акха-Басс, romanized: Aqa-Bass) is a non-residential rural locality (a selo) in Urus-Martanovsky District of the Republic of Chechnya, Russia.

== Administrative and municipal status ==
Municipally, Galanchozh is incorporated into Gekhi-Chuyskoye rural settlement. It is one of the three settlements included in it.

Until 31 December 2019, Galanchozh was included in Achkhoy-Martanovsky District, but on 1 January 2020 - was transferred to the control of Urus-Martanovsky District.

At the same time, Galanchozh is the administrative center of Galanchozhsky District. The district is formally restored, but it is not a part of the administrative-territorial structure of the Chechen Republic.

== Geography ==
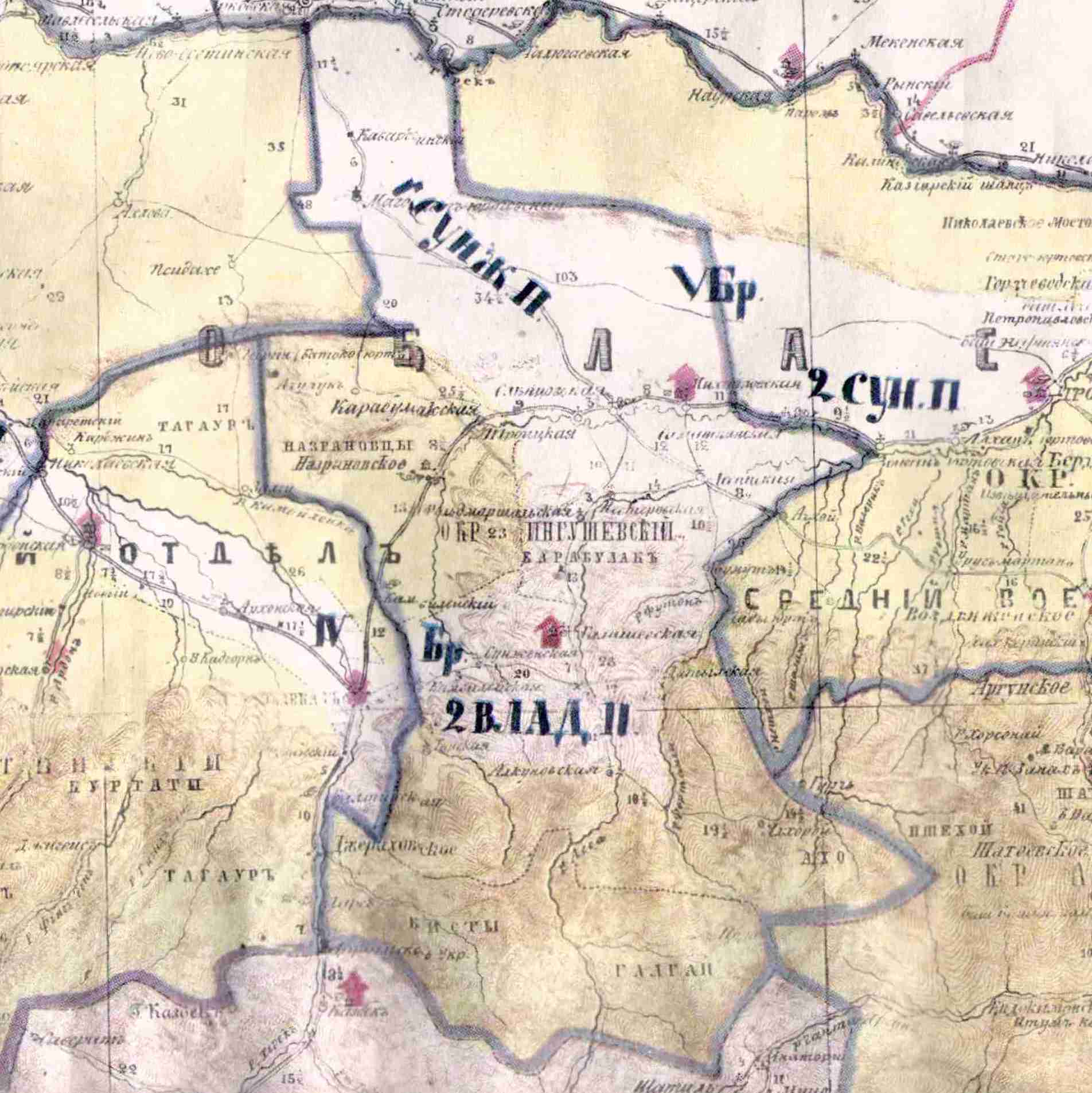
Galanchozh included on the map of the Ingush district in 1853.

Map of Urus-Martanovsky District with Gekhi-Chu rural settlement highlighted. Aka-Bass is in the south

Aka-Bass is located in the center of Galanchozhsky District, on the left bank of the Osu-Khi river. It is located less than 1 kilometre (0.62 mi) north-west from Lake Galanchozh. It is 60 kilometres (37 mi) south-west of the city of Grozny.

The closest settlements and ruins to Aka-Bass are 'Amka to the north-west, Körga to the north-east, Ker-Bi-Te and 'Amye to the south-east, Chikondi-Pkhäda and Äkka to the south-west, and Ittar-Källa to the west.

== History ==
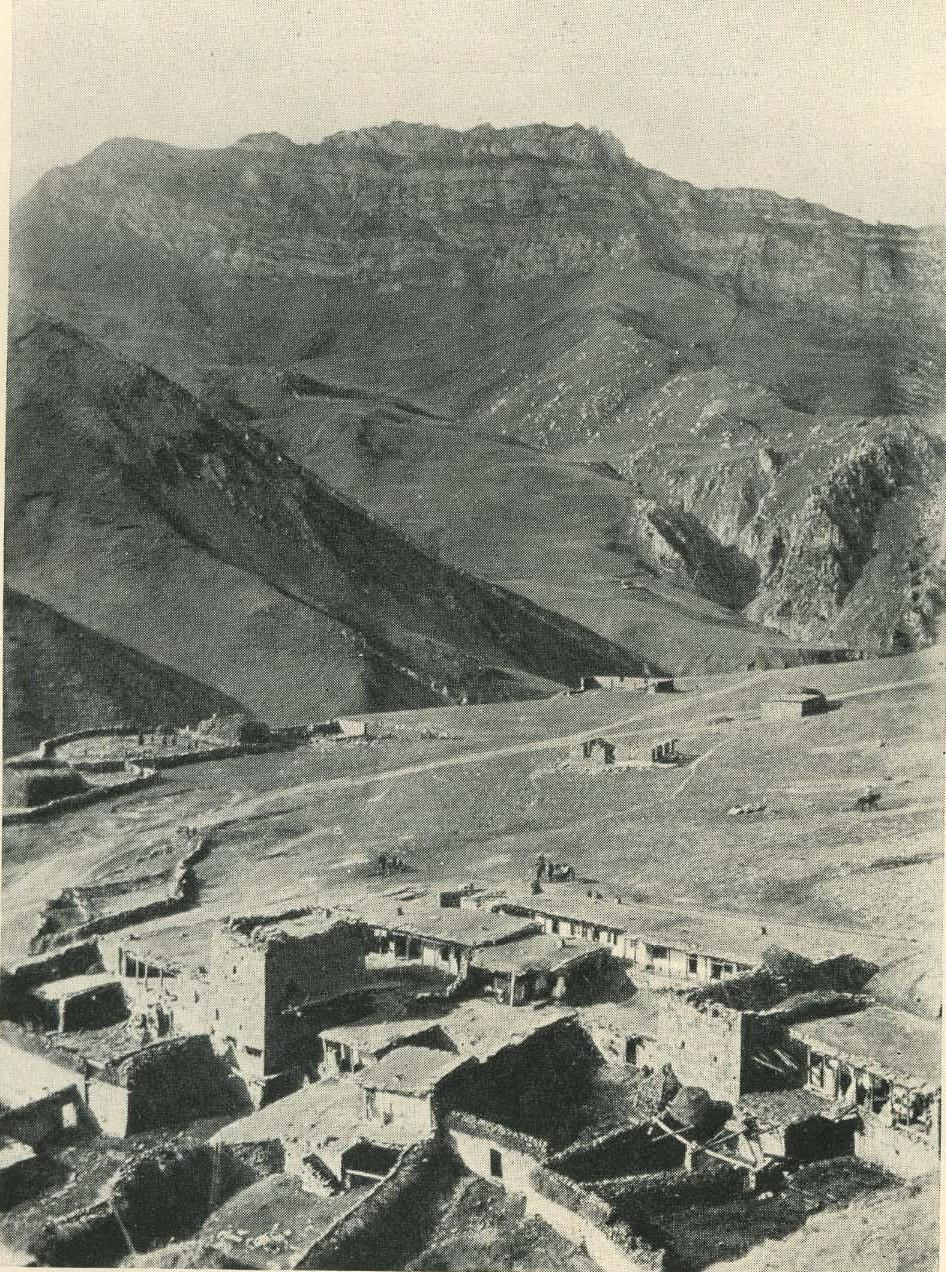
Aka-Bass before it was abandoned in 1944.

There's a possibility that the German historian and ethnographer Julius Klaproth may have named Galanchozh among other Ingush villages in the beginning of 19th century.

According to the Regulations on the management of the Terek Oblast in 1862, the Ingushskiy Okrug was established as part of the Western Department. It included societies of Nazranians, Karabulaks, Galgai, Kistins, Akkins and Tsorins (also Meredzhin society and some Galanchozh and Yalkharoy auls). The village of Galanchozh was part of the Gorsky section of the Ingush district. In 1866 the village of Galanchozh (Meredzhi society, some Galanchozh, Yalkharoy auls and Akkin society) was ceded to the Argunskiy Okrug due to them belonging to the same nation as the locals (Chechen) and geographically closer to the central governance of the Okrug.

In 1929, a rebel government was established in Aka-Bass against the Bolshevik government in the mountains of Chechnya. During the next wave of resistance, a provisional rebel government was established in 1940 by members of the local armed forces.

In 1942, the Soviet Air Force carried out two large-scale bombings in the Chechen mountains, and Galanchozhsky District was particularly hard-hit by the attacks.

In 1944, after the ethnic cleansing and deportation of the Chechen and Ingush people and the Chechen-Ingush ASSR was abolished, the aul of Aka-Bass was abandoned and destroyed.

In 1957, after the Vaynakh people returned and the Chechen-Ingush ASSR was restored, former residents of Galanchozhsky District were forbidden to resettle there. As a result, most former residents of Aka-Bass resettled in the flat lands of the republic, mostly in the Achkhoy-Martanovsky, Sernovodsky and Groznensky districts.

In 2019, Aka-Bass was named as one of the first settlements in Galanchozhsky District to be rebuilt in order to resettle the area.

== Demographics ==
National censuses done by the Russian empire and the Soviet Union in 1874,1883, 1891, 1914 and 1926 showed that all of the inhabitants of Galanchozh and its surrounding villages were ethnic Chechens in all 5 censuses.

== Infrastructure ==
On 31 August 2019, the newly rebuilt mosque in Aka-Bass was opened. The mosque stands on the very same place that the old mosque stood before it was destroyed in 1944. However, there was still no permanent population in Aka-Bass at this time.

== Bibliography ==
- Волкова, Н.Г. (1974). Этнический состав населения Северного Кавказа в XVIII — начале XX века [Ethnic composition of the population of the North Caucasus in the 18th - early 20th centuries] (in Russian). Москва: Наука. pp. 1–276.
- Ингушетия в политике Российской империи на Кавказе. XIX век. Сборник документов и материалов [Ingushetia in the policy of the Russian Empire in the Caucasus. XIX century. Collection of documents and materials] (in Russian). Ростов-на-Дону: Южный издательский дом. 2020. pp. 1–760. ISBN 978-5-98864-060-8.
- Список горских аулов Кубанской и Терской областей [List of mountain villages of the Kuban and Terek regions] (in Russian). Тифлис: Типография Главного Управления Наместника Кавказского; типогрфия Меликова и К. 1869. pp. 41–52 (418–429 PDF). – Сборник статистических сведений о Кавказе / Сост. и ред. Н. И. Воронов, Кавказский отдел Императорского русского географического общества
