= Dattykh =

Rural locality in Ingushetia

Dattykh Даттых
- Selo

Other transcription(s)
  - Ingush: Даьттагӏе (Note: • Commonly mentioned as 'Dättaghe' (Ingush: ДаьттагIе), however the village was sometimes mentioned as 'Dättagha' (Ingush: ДаьттагIа).)
- Interactive map of Dattykh
- Location of Dattykh Dattykh (Republic of Ingushetia)
- Coordinates: 43°01′52″N 45°06′04″E
- Country: Russia
- Federal subject: Ingushetia
- Founded: 1801

Government
  - Head: Khairov Bakhit Khasanovich
- Elevation: 641 m (2,103 ft)

Population (2010 Census)
  - Total: 240
  - Estimate (2021): 277 (+15.4%)

Administrative status
  - Subordinated to: Sunzhensky District
- Time zone: UTC+3 (MSK)
- Postal code: 386243
- OKTMO ID: 26610455101

Dattykh (Ingush: Даьттагӏе, romanized: Dättaghe) is a rural locality (a selo) in Sunzhensky District of the Republic of Ingushetia, Russia, located on the left bank of the river Fortanga. It forms the municipality of the rural settlement of Dattykh as the only settlement in its composition.

== Geography ==
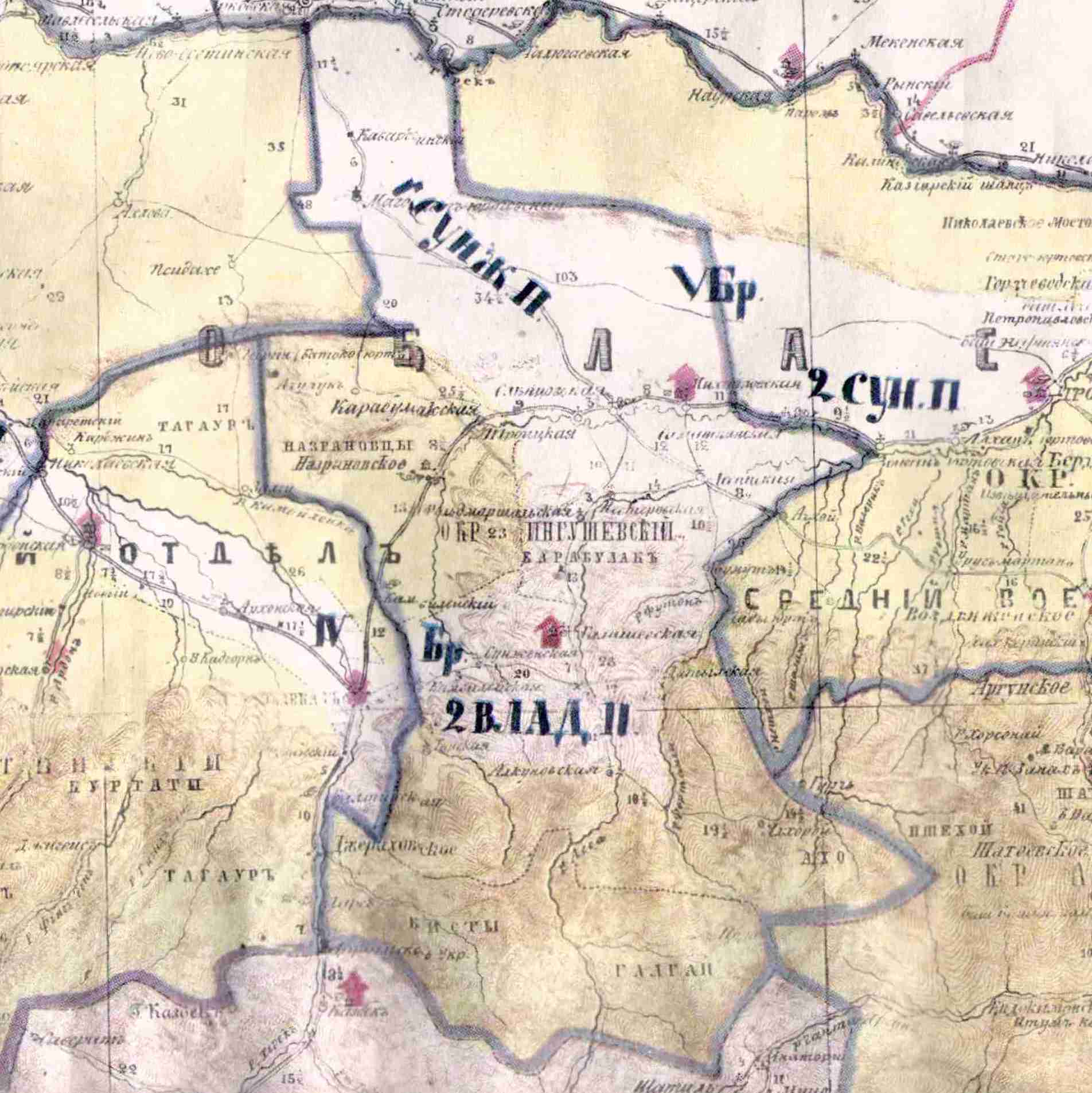
The village of Dattykh on the map of the Ingush district in 1853.

The village is located on the left bank of the Fortanga river.

The nearest settlements: the village of Muzhichi in the west (less than 9 km in a straight line), the village of Galashki in the north-west (nearest by road).

== History ==
Dattykh was founded in 1801 and is the ancestral village of the Bulguchevs and Korigovs (Upper Dattykh) and the Gandaloevs and Belkharoevs (Lower Dattykh). On the territory of the settlement, the remains of battle towers of representatives of these surnames have been preserved.

A well-known source of salt mining - Dattykh, located on the ground lyakh of the Karabulak society, served in the medieval period as the basis welfare of the Belkharoev family. In a later period, evaporated salt from this source was used by all Kists, all Ingush, all Karabulaks and part of Chechens.

In January 6 of 1851, in order to punish the highlanders for their insolence, Sleptsov gathered a detachment and under the command of Lieutenant Colonel Mezentsev made a punitive expedition on Dattykh, which has long been known as the nest of the most courageous robbers. The punitive expedition ended successful for the Russian Empire and the detachment continued cutting down forests.

In 1858, Naib of Little Chechnya Said-Dulla by order of Nikolay Yevdokimov made punitive raids on Shagot-Kokh, Dattykh, Azerze, Meredzhi and other villages, where many abreks were hiding.

Beginning in 1859, the Orstkhoys began to be evicted from all their mountain villages, including Dattykh. At the same time, on the site of the settlement, a Cossack village - Datykhskaya was founded.

In 1863, according to family lists, 33 families lived in Dattykh.

In 1865, all Karabulaks were evicted from the village, and among the Muhajirs left for the Ottoman Empire.

In 1875, with the permission of the military authorities, Dattykh began to be populated by the mountaineers from the Khamkhin and Tsorin societies, who rented the royal state land.

From 1944 to 1958, during the period of the deportation of Chechens and Ingush and the abolition of the Chechen-Ingush ASSR, the village was called Klyuchevoye. After the restoration of the Chechen-Ingush ASSRin 1958, the village was returned to its historical name - Dattykh.

== Bibliography ==
- Мальсагов, З. К. (1963). Оздоева, Ф. (ed.). Грамматика ингушского языка [Grammar of the Ingush language] (in Ingush and Russian). Vol. 5 (2nd ed.). Грозный: Чечено-Ингушское Книжное Издательство. pp. 1–164.
- Оздоев, И. А. (1980). Оздоева, Ф. Г.; Куркиев, А. С. (eds.). Русско-ингушский словарь: 40 000 слов [Russian-Ingush dictionary: 40,000 words] (in Ingush and Russian). Москва: Русский язык. pp. 1–832.
- Кодзоев, Н. Д. (2021). Хайрова, Р. Р. (ed.). Русско-ингушский словарь [Russian-Ingush dictionary] (in Ingush and Russian). Ростов-на-Дону. pp. 1–656. ISBN 978-5-906785-55-8.
- Барахоева, Н. М.; Кодзоев, Н. Д.; Хайров, Б. А. (2016). Ингушско-русский словарь терминов [Ingush-Russian dictionary of terms] (in Ingush and Russian) (2 ed.). Нальчик: ООО «Тетраграф». pp. 1–288.
- Кодзоев, Н. Д.; Киева, З. Х. (2021). Накостхоев, Х. А.; Хайрова, Р. Р. (eds.). Ономастикон Ингушетии [Onomasticon of Ingushetia] (in Russian). Москва: ТПК «Центробланк». pp. 1–121. ISBN 978-5-91303-022-1.
- Волкова, Н. Г. (1974). Этнический состав населения Северного Кавказа в XVIII — начале XX века [Ethnic composition of the population of the North Caucasus in the 18th — early 20th centuries] (in Russian). Москва: Наука. pp. 1–276.
- Ибрагимова, З. Х. (2009). Царское прошлое чеченцев. Политика и экономика [The tsarist past of the Chechens. Politics and Economics.] (in Russian). Москва: ПРОБЕЛ-2000. pp. 1–872. ISBN 978-5-98604-150-6.
