= Russian conquest of Chechnya and Dagestan =

1817–1859 conflict in the North Caucasus

- Part of the Caucasian War
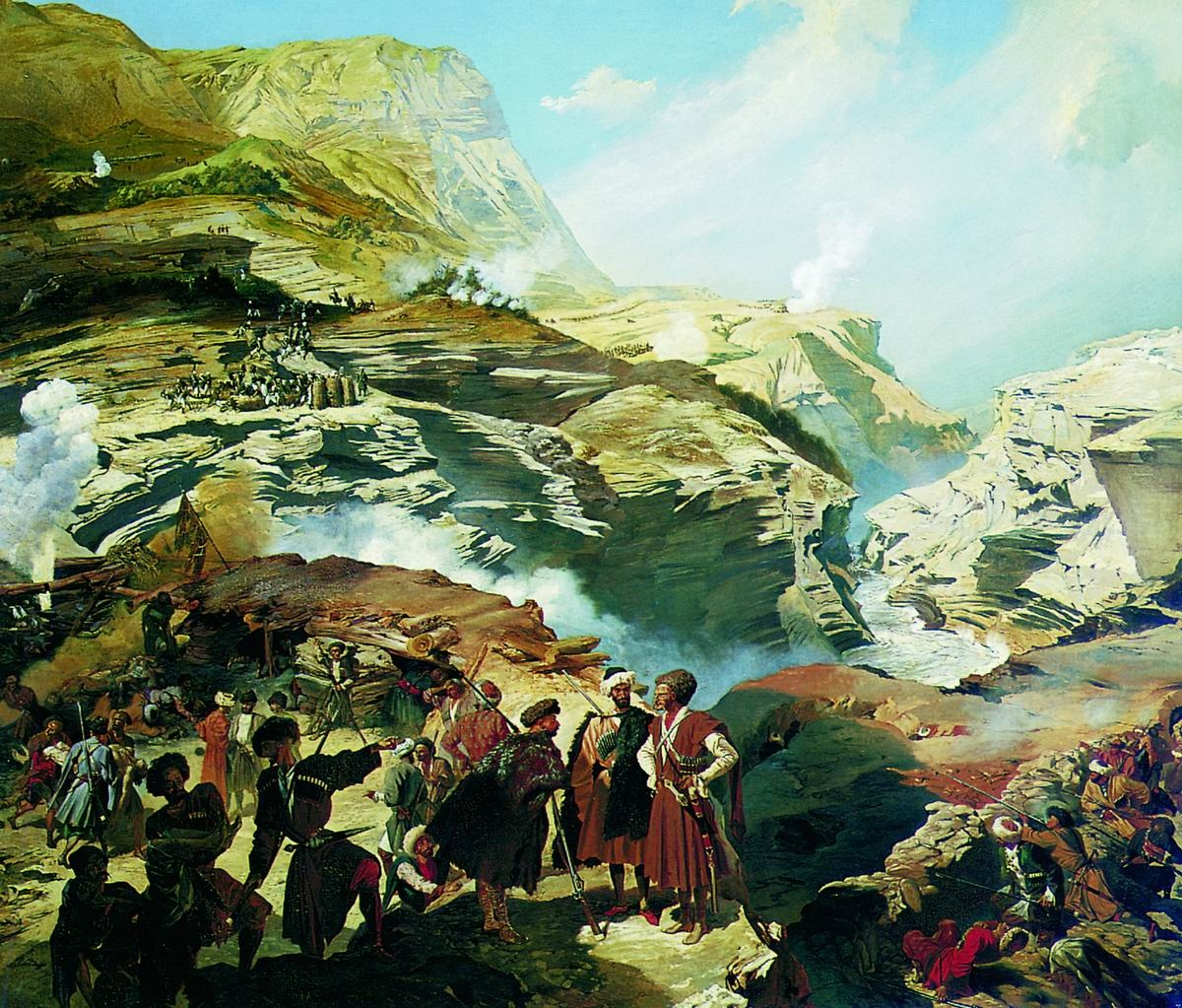
- The Battle of Akhatle in Dagestan, 8 May 1841
| Date | 1817 – 25 August 1859 (Note: Disorganized resistance continued into the late 1870’s.) (~40 years) |
| Location | North Caucasus |
| Result | Russian victory; Postwar initiation of the Circassian genocide |
| Territorial changes | Annexation of Dagestan and Chechnya into the Russian Empire |

Belligerents
| Russian Empire | Caucasian Imamate; Tarki Shamkhalate; (Ingushetia) Ingush rebels (Note: Consisted of Nazranians, Karabulaks and Galashians.); Karachay rebels |

Commanders and leaders
| (Russian Empire) Nicholas I #; (Russian Empire) Alexander II; (Russian Empire) Aleksey Yermolov; (Russian Empire) Pavel Zotov; (Russian Empire) Nikolay Yevdokimov; (Russian Empire) A. I. Baryatinskiy; (Russian Empire) A. N. Lüders; (Russian Empire) Leonty Nicolay; (Russian Empire) Pavel Grabbe; (Russian Empire) Grigory Zass (WIA); (Russian Empire) Mikhail Vorontsov #; (Russian Empire) Yevgeny Golovin #; (Russian Empire) Apollon Galafeyev #; (Russian Empire) Mikhail Lermontov #; (Russian Empire) G. V. Rosen #; (Russian Empire) Alexey Velyaminov #; (Russian Empire) David Gurieli †; (Russian Empire) A. P. Pullo; (Russian Empire) I. M. Labyntsev; (Russian Empire) Maxim Taube; (Russian Empire) Kluki Klugenau; (Russian Empire) R. K. Freitag; (Russian Empire) Yakov Baklanov; (Russian Empire) Alexander Wrangel; (Russian Empire) Vincens Kozlovsky; (Russian Empire) Alexey Gramotin; (Russian Empire) Nikolai Evdokimov; (Russian Empire) Kaziy-Girey; (Russian Empire) Dmitry Yagotinov; (Russian Empire) D. V. Passek †; (Russian Empire) V. M. Viktorov † | (Caucasian Imamate) Ghāzī Muḥammad †; (Caucasian Imamate) Hamzat Bek X; (Caucasian Imamate) Imam Shamil (WIA) (surrendered); (Caucasian Imamate) Benoyn Boysġar; (Caucasian Imamate) Duba Vashindaroevsky; (Caucasian Imamate) Muhammad Amin; (Caucasian Imamate) Beibulat Taimiev; (Caucasian Imamate) Talkhig of Shali (surrendered); (Caucasian Imamate) Hadji Murad #; (Caucasian Imamate) Shuaib-Mulla #; (Caucasian Imamate) Isa of Gendergen #; (Caucasian Imamate) Tashaw-Hadji #; (Caucasian Imamate) Ibrahim Cherkessi †; (Caucasian Imamate) Idris Girgabilsky †; (Caucasian Imamate) Eski of Michik; (Caucasian Imamate) Ullubey Aukh; (Caucasian Imamate) Ahberdila Muhammad; (Caucasian Imamate) Alibek Khiriyasul; (Caucasian Imamate) Akhberdil Mohammed; (Caucasian Imamate) Abdurakhman Germenchuk †; (Caucasian Imamate) Hadjiyav Tlokh †; (Caucasian Imamate) Abakar-Dibir †; (Caucasian Imamate) Soib-Mulla †; (Caucasian Imamate) Eldar Aukh †; (Caucasian Imamate) Jawatkhan of Dargo †; Irazi-bek Kazanishensky; (Ingushetia) Jagostuko Bekhoev; (Ingushetia) Dzhogast Bekhoev; (Ingushetia) Chandyr Archakov (executed); (Ingushetia) Mohammed Mazurov (executed); (Ingushetia) Urusbi Mugaev (executed); (Ingushetia) Bashir Ashiev (executed); Magomet Hubiev |

Strength
| Over 60,000; At least 28 guns | (Caucasian Imamate) 20,000–25,000 At least 4 guns; ~1,000; (Ingushetia) 5,000; 1,500–3,000 |

Casualties and losses
| Total: 18,223; 8,160 killed 9,920 wounded 8 missing 132 shell-shocked 3 guns | Total: 7,129; 3,572 killed 2,021 wounded 1,036 captured 500 shell-shocked |

The Russian conquest of Chechnya and Dagestan, whose later phase from 1829 to 1859 is also known as the Murid War, was the eastern theatre of the Caucasian War of 1817–1864. During this campaign, the Russian Empire conquered the independent peoples of the Eastern Caucasus.

When Russia annexed Georgia in 1801, it needed to control the Georgian Military Road in the central Caucasus – the only practical north–south route across the mountains. Russian control of the road meant the division of the fighting in the Caucasian War into two theatres. West of the road, in the Russo-Circassian War, the tribes did not unite and the war became very complex. In the east the tribes joined in the Caucasian Imamate, a military-theocratic state which held out for thirty years. This state, established by Ghazi Muhammad in 1829–1832, came under the rule of Imam Shamil from 1834 until his surrender in 1859.

== Background ==
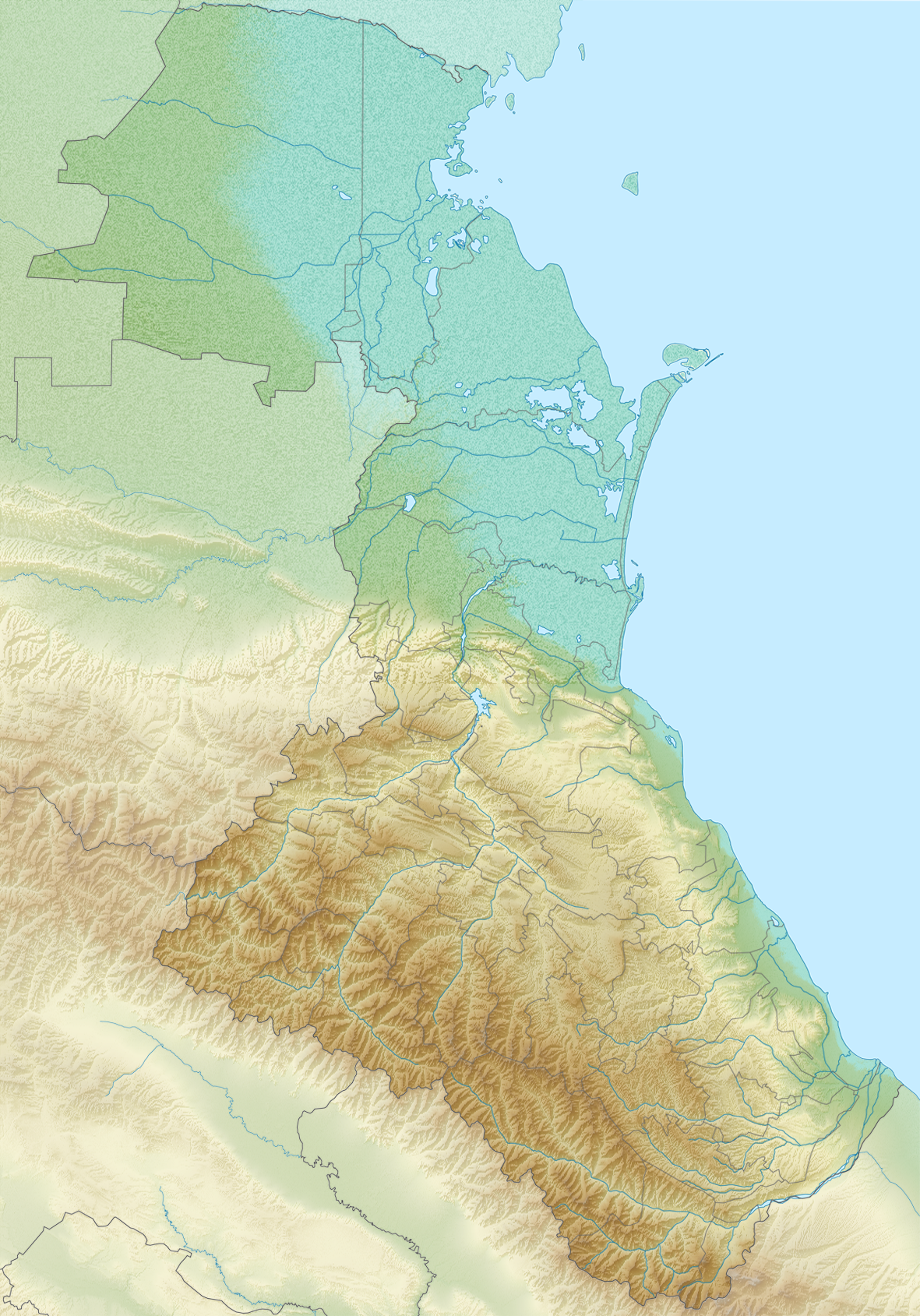
Rivers of Dagestan

=== Geography ===
The region of fighting formed a rough triangle or rectangle about 150 by 200 km.:

- The northern boundary was the east-flowing Terek River.
- The eastern boundary lay inland from the Caspian Sea where the foothills meet the Caspian plain.
- The southern boundary occasionally extended to the Samur River, but much of the south was under some degree of Russian control.
- The southwestern boundary ran along the crest of the Caucasus. This area was inaccessible and was only crossed by a few raids into Georgia in the far south.
- The western boundary was the Georgian Military Highway.

At first, most of the fighting took place within a 75 kilometer radius of Gimry (42.760°N 46.838°E). After 1839, the center of resistance moved northwest to the forests of Chechnya.

The basic geographic distinction separates the forests of Chechnya in the northwest and the high and barren plateaus of Dagestan in the east. In Dagestan, just north of Gimry, the east-flowing Andi Koysu joins the north-flowing Avar Koysu to form the Sulak River, which flows north and then east. All three streams flow in very deep canyons. To the east, plateaus and canyons run down to the narrow coastal plain of the Caspian Sea. To the south are more plateaus, canyons and mountains. This region, called Avaria (from its major language), was partly ruled by the Avar Khanate at Khunzakh and the Kazikumukh Khanate further south. North of Gimry and the Andi Koysu is the Salatau plateau and west of it is a lower area marked by the village of Andi. North of these are the forested valleys of Chechnya, a region called Ichkeria. At about the line of the Terek, the forests give way to steppe. The Chechens used this for winter pasture until the Russians pushed them south. Between the Terek and the mountains was a 30–70 km belt of forested flat country which has now been cleared for agriculture. The western boundary is the Georgian Military Highway which follows the north-flowing upper Terek River. The northwest bend of the Terek was the main area where forest-cutting and Cossack villages were pushed southeast into the Chechen forests.

=== The war as a siege ===
Velyaminov, Yermolov's chief of staff, described the Caucasus as an enormous fortress with a 600,000-man garrison which could not be taken by storm and could only be taken by siege. The Caucasian War was, as put by Veltaminov, a decades-long siege. The many campaigns into the interior only served to wear the mountaineers down and did not result in permanent occupation until the latter years of fighting.

=== Fighting in the lowlands ===
The Russian infantry had little difficulty with flat country that had been cleared for agriculture. These areas often had rulers who could be pressured and subjects who were used to obedience.

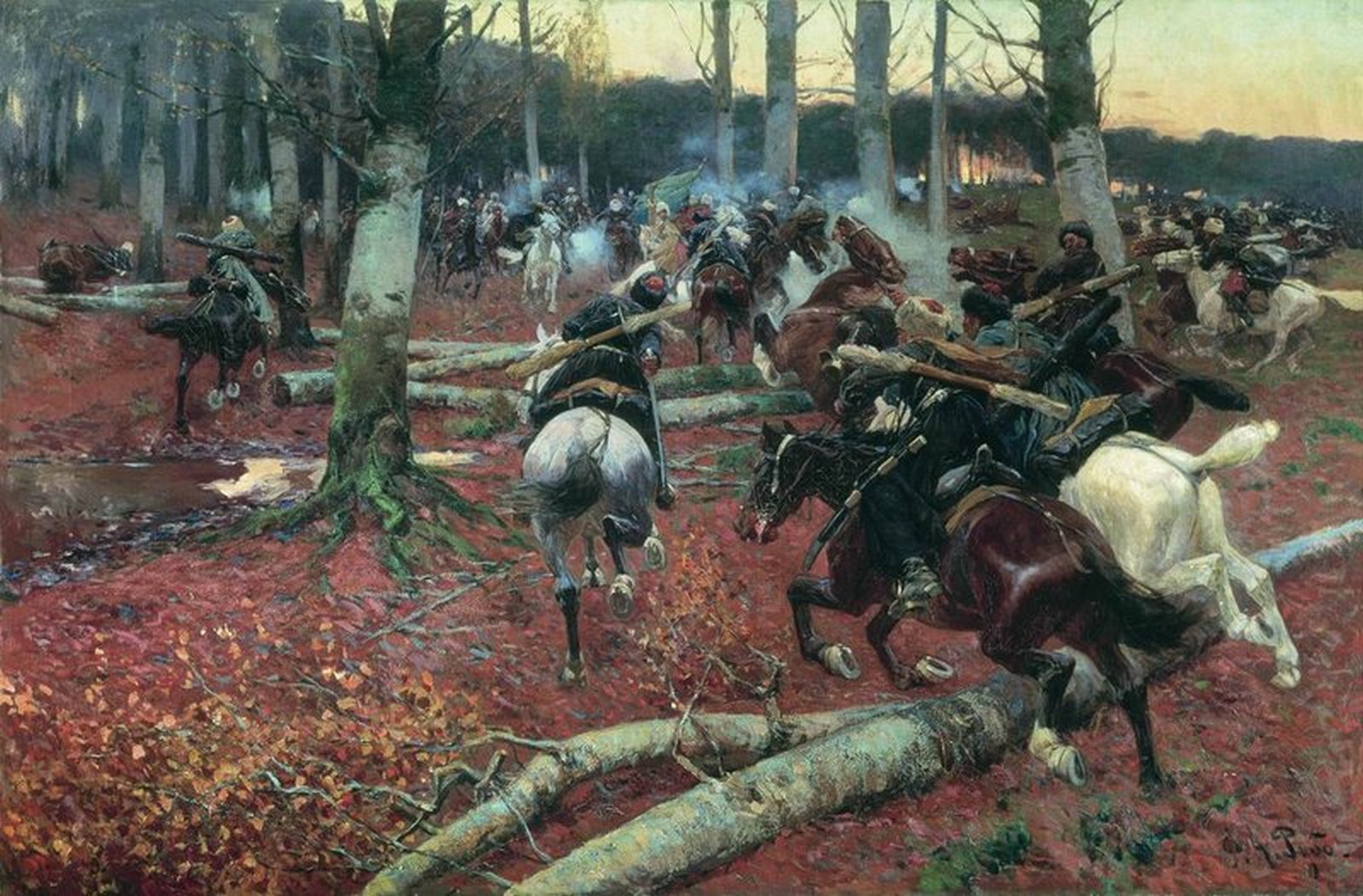
Fighting in the forests of Chechnya

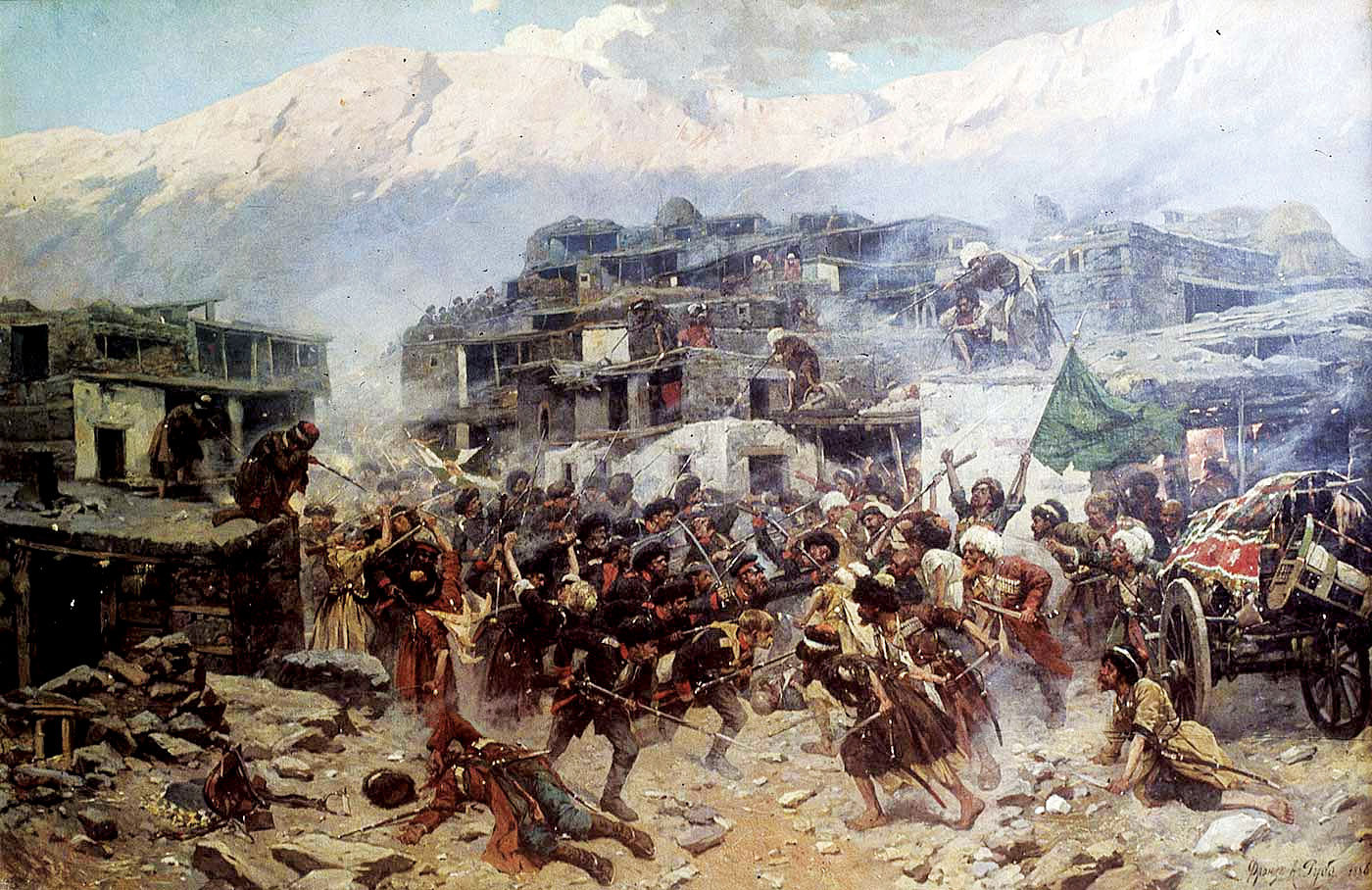
Fighting in the mountains of Dagestan

=== Fighting in the forests of Chechnya ===
In the northwest, Chechnya extends from the high mountains down through a series of north–south valleys to the flat country. The whole region was forested to about the Terek River. The Russians could easily send a raiding party into the forest, burn a few villages and withdraw, but anything larger was nearly impossible. A large force with its baggage train would string out for a mile or more along a forest path where it would be attacked from both sides as soon as the mountaineers gathered enough men. This required skirmish lines on both sides, the so-called "column in a box". A large force could fight its way through or out, but at unacceptable cost. The only safe way to move through the forest was to cut down the trees for a musket shot on both sides of the road. Many of the trees were large beech trees that were hard to cut down and provided excellent sniper roosts. Forest cutting was a major activity during the whole period. Since lowland Chechnya is good farmland, Cossack military-agricultural villages were pushed southward as the trees were cut down. Forest fighting extended all along the north Caucasus and merged into the Circassian war further west. The Russians preferred to fight in winter when there was less cover.

=== Fighting in the mountains of Dagestan ===
In the east, Dagestan was higher and dryer with only patches of forest. Especially in the north it was a system of plateaus cut by deep gorges. Villages were usually built on crags, houses were of stone with loopholes and interlocked so that the whole village was a fort. Some were built stairstep-wise up the side of a hill so that a storming party needed ladders to move from one house to the next. These could be taken by storm at great cost or blasted open with artillery. Lack of firewood made permanent occupation difficult. The best time for the Russians was high summer when the snow had melted and there was grass for the horses.

=== Between two fires ===
Each village or Khanate was effectively independent. If it wanted to resist it had to consider how many soldiers the Russians could bring to the area. But if it submitted it could expect a counter-attack from Shamil. "Pacified" villages had varying degrees of autonomy which changed with time. Especially on the edges, many villages changed sides several times depending on which side was most threatening.

== Outline ==
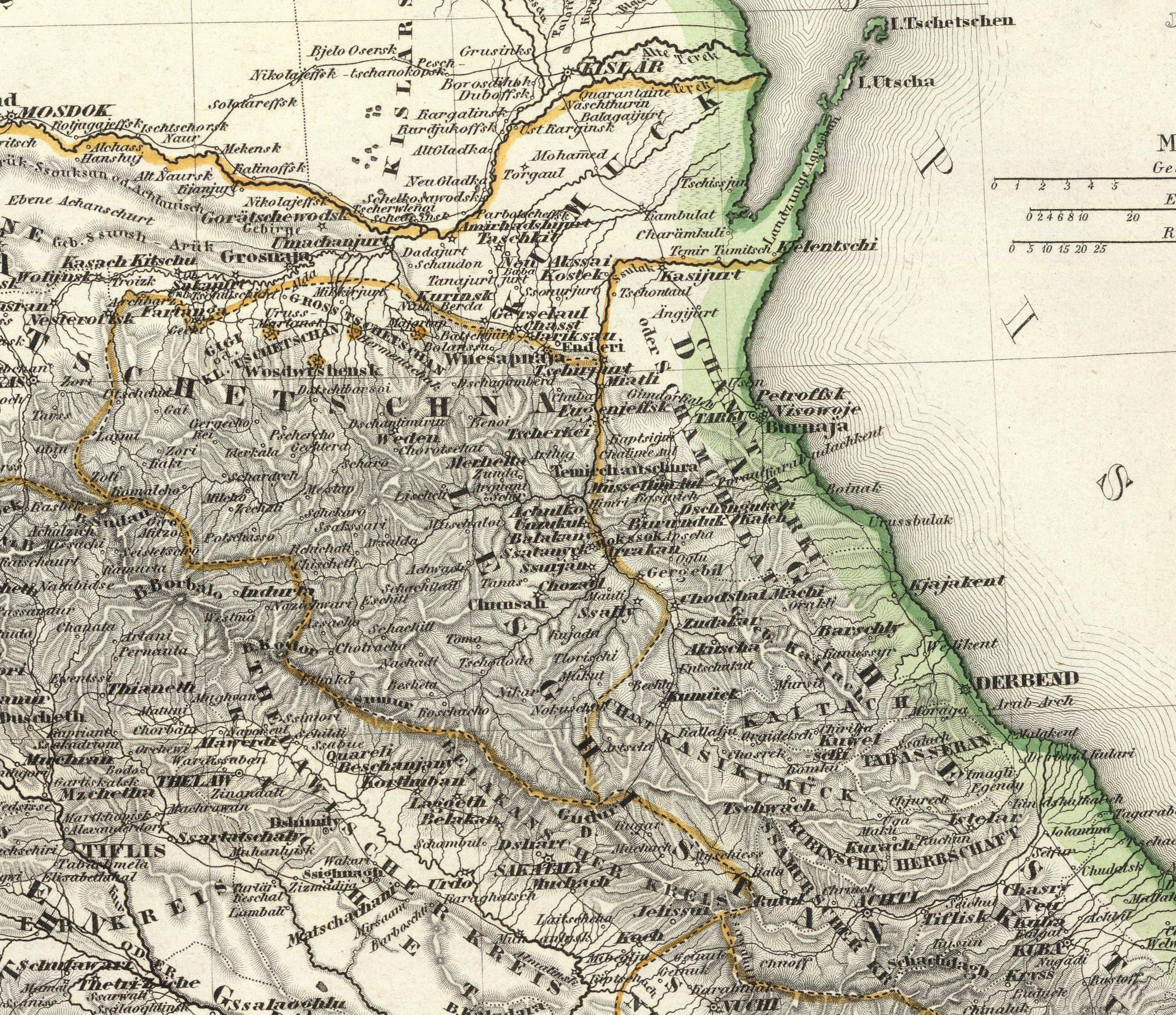
Eastern Caucasus on a German map of 1856. Note the unusual spellings

Ghazi Muhammad (1829–1832) established the Imamate, was unable to capture the Avar Khanate to the southwest and died in battle. Hamzat Bek (1832–1834) captured the Avar Khanate and was killed in revenge for his murder of the Avar ruling family. Imam Shamil (1834–1859) gained power, and in 1839 was besieged for 80 days in the rock fortress of Akhulgo. The night the place fell, he escaped with a few men. In 1840, he re-established himself in Chechnya. By 1843, he held most of Dagestan. In 1845, Vorontsov was nearly annihilated when he tried to penetrate the Chechen forest. In 1846, Shamil failed to take Kabardia to the west. In 1847–1857, things were stable. The Russians sent a number of expeditions into Dagestan, usually taking a village and withdrawing. In Chechnya, the steady process of deforestation continued. In 1858, the Russians captured the Argun Valley, cutting Chechnya in half. In 1859, resistance collapsed and Shamil surrendered and went into honorable exile at Kaluga and died in 1871 on a pilgrimage to Mecca.

== The origins of Muridism ==
There had been a few Cossacks on the Terek River since about 1520. From 1800 to 1830, the Russians annexed Georgia south of the mountains, gained control of the Khanates along the Caspian coast and built up the Caucasian Line of forts along the northern edge of the mountains. With the end of the Turkish and Persian wars in 1829, they could turn their full attention to the mountains.

There had always been Sufi groups in the area, especially in Dagestan. Of these, the Naqshbandi order was noted for their strict adherence to religious law (Shariat) and the duty of a Murid (Note: Note that the Russians used the term "Murid" for any follower of Shamil without regard for the word's religious meaning.) or disciple to his teacher or Murshid. Although this was purely spiritual, under Russian pressure it became merged with the idea of Gazivat and Jihad. The ideas of religious duty, obedience to a master, strict religious law, and holy war became the basis of the Caucasian Imamate, with religion being vital for holding together many of the independent clans and villages.

== Imam Ghazi Muhammad 1829–1832 ==
All dates are old style, so add 12 days for the western calendar. For help with the numerous place-names each place will be given by its approximate distance and direction from Gimry (42.760°N 46.838°E). Thus the Caspian Sea is 70 kilometers east and Dargo is 50 km northwest.

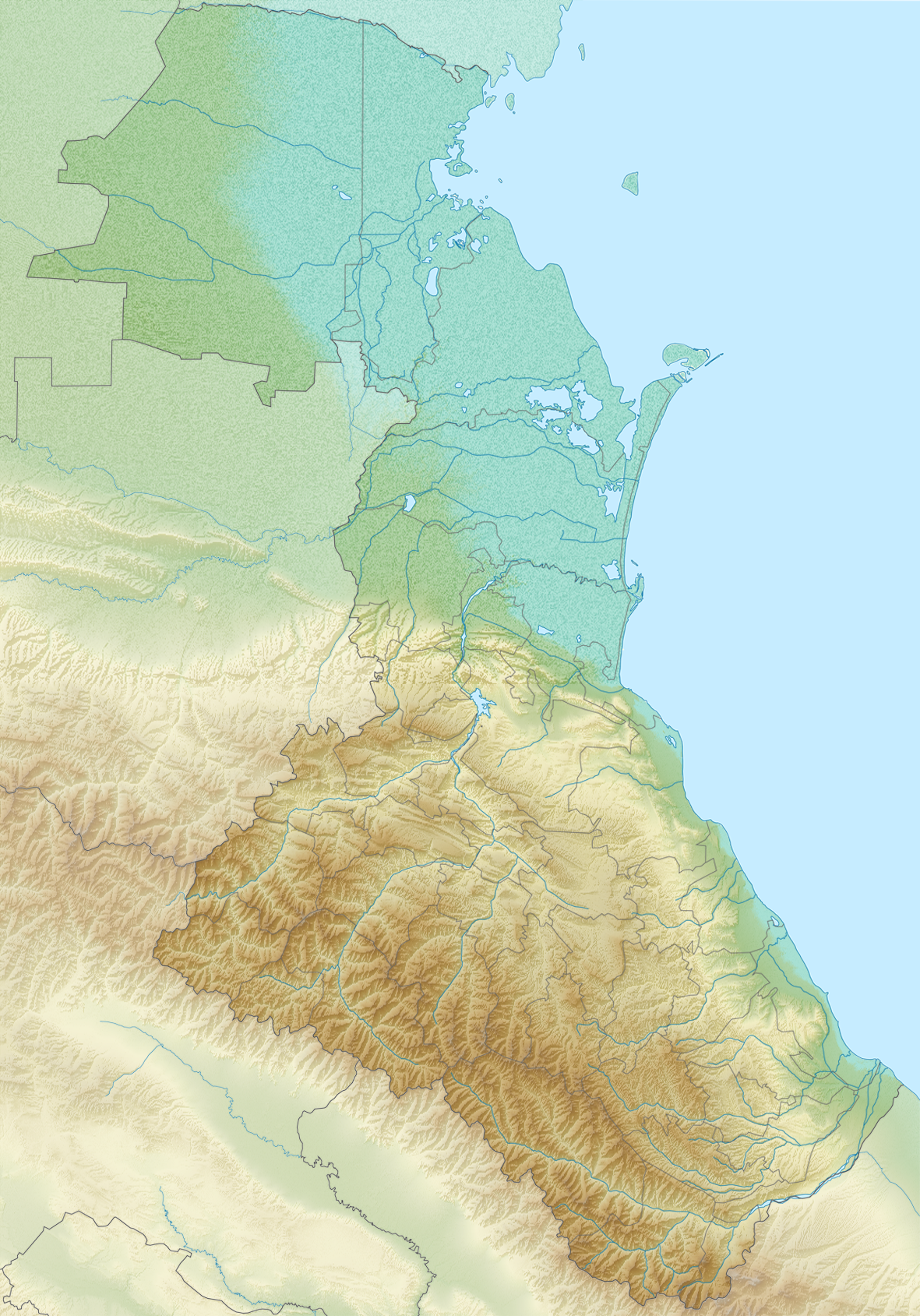
Places mentioned on a map of Dagestan
Yellow=Khanate; Blue=Russian fort

Ghazi Muhammad was born at Gimry around 1793 and grew up with Imam Shamil, who was a few years younger. He studied theology at Karanay (10 km NE) and Arakani (20 km SE) and began to preach at Gimry in 1827. His fame grew and he was invited to Tarki (60 km E) and Kazikumukh (70 km S). By the end of 1829, many of the people of inner Dagestan had become his followers. At first preaching shariat, his thought turned increasingly to holy war which he first preached openly at the end of 1829.

In 1830, he enacted his first military move, which was attacking his former teacher Sagheed of Arikani (20 km SE) whom opposed his preachings. He took the town, burned Sagheed's books and poured out all the wine in town. Sagheed escaped and took refuge in with Avar Khan of Kazikumukh. He took Karanai (10 km NE), Erpeli (12 km E), and then Maitli (36 km N) where he had the Kadi shot for disobedience. At a meeting at Gimry attended by religious leaders from all over Dagestan, he was proclaimed Imam. This nascent religious state clashed with the political Avar Khanate at Khunzakh (25 km SW). On 4 February, he led 3,000 men to Andi (50 km W), gained more support and marched on Khunzakh where he was defeated with a loss of 200 killed and 60 captured. In May 1830, Baron Rosen with 6,000 men marched on Gimry, dared not attack it, looted the local herds and withdrew. In September–October he went to Chechnya to consolidate relations. In May and December the Alazani River valley (200 km S) in Georgia was raided.

1831: In Feb–Mar Kazi Mulla took a position in the forest of Chumkeskent (15 km E) where he could defend Gimry and strike in any direction. Two attempts to dislodge him failed in April, as did a third attempt in May. These successes may have led them to think they could hold a fixed position, contributing to the disaster at Akhulgo 8 years later. About this time some Russian forces along with General Paskevich were withdrawn to deal with the Polish uprising. Taking advantage of this, in May 1831 Kazi Mulla captured Tarki (60 km E) under the guns of Fort Burnaya but was driven back to Chumkeskent by reinforcements. In June he besieged Fort Vnezapnaya (50 km N) and then withdrew to a forest followed by General Emmanuel and 2,500 Russians. He killed or wounded 400 of them, wounding the general, and returned to Chumkeskent. For 8 days in August he besieged Derbent (140 km SE) at the request of the people of Tabassaran. Note that Kazi Mulla fought aggressively, sending columns in all directions, while Shamil fought defensively, holding the center and waiting for the Russians to attack him. Around October the Russians attacked the Salatau plateau (20 km N) but Kazi Mulla drew them off by threatening Grozny (115 km NW). On 1 November, he sacked Kizlyar (125 km N) and took 200 prisoners, mostly women. On 01Dec Miklashevsky captured Chumkeskent taking no prisoners. The Russians began building the Lesgian Line in the far south.

1832: Things were quiet until spring. In April 1832 he went to Chechnya, threatened Vladikavkaz and besieged Nazran (180 km NW). It is said that Kazi Mulla advised the Chechens to withdraw to the forests and cultivate maize instead of wheat. Another force achieved the submission of the southern part of Chechnya. These new recruits killed some Orthodox missionaries and raided the Georgian Military Highway. The Russians responded by sending 3,000 men to the roadless Galgai country (180 km W) near the mountain crest southeast of Vladikavkaz. At one point the expedition was held up for 3 days by a defensive tower manned by exactly two men. The village of Tsori was destroyed the following day and the expedition returned to Vladikavkaz.

In August 1832 Rosen and Velyaminov harried lower Chechnya, as they had been doing for several years. On the 18th Kazi Mulla had his last success. He raided near Amir-Hadji-Yurt on the Terek, drew 500 Cossacks into a forest and killed 106 of them including the commander. In Chechnya Germenchuk (85 km NW) was taken and then Velyaminov went deep into the forests and took Dargo (60 km NW), a place that was not yet important. These expeditions destroyed 61 villages and received the submission of 80 more at a cost of 17 Russians killed and 351 wounded. Kazi Mulla and Shamil retired to Gimry and prepared for a major attack. There was talk of a truce which the Russians rejected. At the Battle of Gimry (17 October 1832) a sudden Russian advance trapped 60 Murids in a fortified house. Nearly all were killed, only two escaping. That night the Russians learned that one of the dead was Ghazi Muhammad. One of the two who escaped was Shamil.

== Imam Hamzat Bek 1832–1834 ==
Banner Three-pointed, green. The inscription on the banner reads:«In the midst of the horrors of battle do not be weaker in spirit for a single minute. Be firm before dangers, death does not come before the hour, appointed by the will of God».

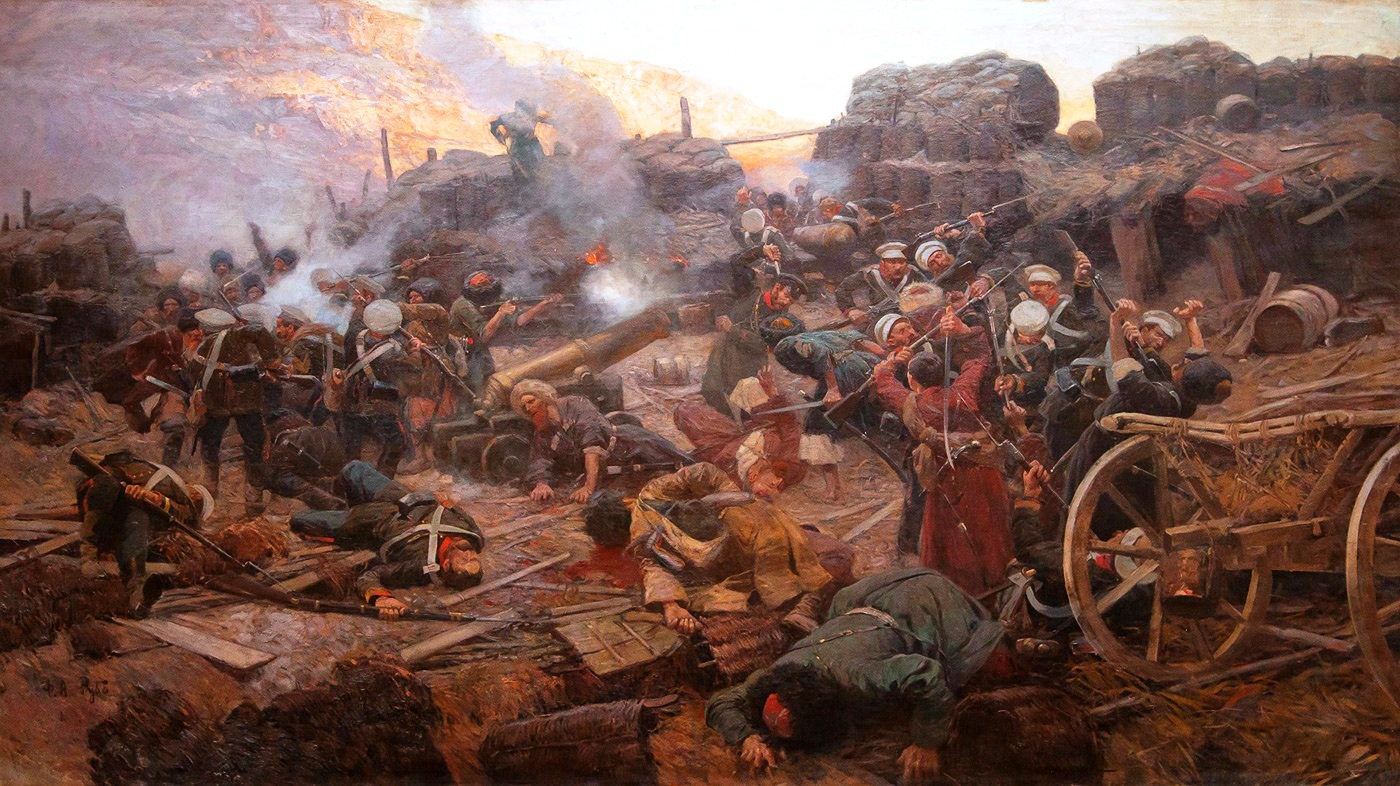
Battle in the mountains, by Franz Roubaud, 1890.

Hamzat Bek was born in Gotsatl (also spelled Hutsal) 14 km east of Khunzakh in 1789. He was a janka, or son of a nobleman by a commoner. His father was an administrator and raider into Georgia. Pakhu-Bikhe, the late Khan's widow, arranged for his education. He took to drink but was reformed by Kazi Mulla and became a military leader in the south. In 1830 he raided into Georgia, went to the Russian camp to negotiate and was arrested. He owed his release to both the Russians who wanted to use him against the Imam and Asian Khan of Kazikumukh who hoped to use him against Pakhu-Bikhe. He rejoined the Imam and continued raiding in the south. He was in command of Chumkeskent when that place was taken. At the Battle of Gimry he was blocked from reinforcing Kazi Mulla.

At Kazi Mulla's death (October 1832), and with Shamil seriously wounded, he was immediately appointed Imam. This prompt action by the religious (non-military) leaders may have saved the Imamate from disintegration. At first he was only recognized around Gimry but he used a mixture of force and diplomacy to expand his authority.

By the autumn of 1833 he had become powerful enough to worry the Russians. He tried negotiations, but the Russian terms made compromise impossible. In September or October he took Gergebil (40 km SSE) which was backed by Russia and several ‘pacified’ Khanates. The Imamate now surrounded the Khanate of Avaria on three sides and conflict was unavoidable. In February–March 1834 Pakhu-Bikhe tried secretly to have him assassinated. In August 1834 Hamzad laid siege to Khunzakh. Pakhu-Bikhe had defeated the Murids at the Battle of Khunzakh in 1830, but this time she saw that resistance was useless. During the negotiations she sent her eight-year-old son to Hamzad as hostage. He was later murdered by Shamil. Hamzad now demanded her two older sons. At first she sent one son, then the second. Hamzad hesitated, but Shamil said strike while the iron is hot. On 13 August 1834 they were both cut down, one of them, it is said, taking 20 Murids with him. Hamzad's brother was also killed. Hamzad took Khunzakh, beheaded Pakhu-Bikhe and made himself khan.

In August he marched against Tsudakhar (60 km SSE) but was checked by the Akusha Confederacy, of which Tsudakhar was a part. In October Klugenau took Gergebil and stormed Gosatl.

Hadji Murad was a blood-brother of one of the murdered princes of Khunzakh. By local custom, he had a duty of revenge. On 7 September 1834, in the mosque of Khunzakh, Hamzad was killed by Hadji Murad, his brother and their followers. This led to a general shoot-out which killed a number of people including Hadji's brother Osman who had fired the first shot.

== Imam Shamil 1834–1859 ==
Imam Shamil was born at Gimry in 1797, a few years after Kazi Mulla. The two boys were companions and received similar religious education. Shamil was well over 6 feet tall and was noted for his strength, horsemanship and mastery of weapons. During his lifetime he is said to have been wounded 19 times and left for dead four times. At the Battle of Khunzakh in 1830 he commanded one column and Kazi Mulla the other. In 1832, at the Battle of Gimry, he was in the house where Kazi Mulla was killed. The story goes that he leaped over the backs of a line of soldiers, killed three of them with his sword, was bayonetted by a fourth, killed that man and disappeared. He made his way to Untsukul (7 km SW) and spent several months recovering. What he did under Hamzad is not recorded in the English sources.

1834: Shamil established: When he heard of Hamzad's death he gathered a force and went to Gosatl (25 km S) where he seized the treasury. He forced Hamzad's uncle to surrender Pakhu-Bikhe's captive son, whom he murdered. He then went to Ashitla (9 km W) and was proclaimed Imam (12 September 1834). He set off for Khunzakh, but learned that Lanskoy had attacked Gimry (14sep) because it had not fulfilled the terms made in 1832. He turned back, found Gimry in ruins, and drove Lanskoy off. On 2 October Klugenau set out from Temir-Khan-Shura with 3500 men to pacify Dagestan. He went to Akusha, Gergebil and Gosatl and drove off 1000 murids under Shamil. At Gosatl on 20 October he had the Dagestani elders declare Asian (Aslan?) Khan of Kazikumukh the temporary Khan of Avaria. The elders swore loyalty to Asian Khan and the Czar and Klugenau returned to Temir-Khan-Shura.

1835–36: A quiet period: For something over a year the mountaineers were left alone. Shamil seemed weak, Klugenau had only 2500 men and most Russian troops were tied up in Circassia. Klugenau thought the Dagestanis should not be attacked unless they could be decisively defeated. Around the end of 1834 he and Shamil made a very informal agreement in which Shamil accepted Russian suzerainty and agreed not to attack the lowlands in return for Russian non-intervention in the mountains. Shamil spent much of the year preaching and reading the Koran, thereby strengthening himself as a religious as well as a military leader. At some point Shamil moved from Gimry to Ashitla. Although Shamil had the title of Imam several other men were almost his equals. Hajj Tasho had a fort "on the Michik River near Zandaq" (?) from which he actively raided the Russians. At the beginning of 1836 he sent an appeal to the Dagestani leaders complaining of Shamil's inactivity. Shamil called a meeting at Chirkey in which they agreed to work together under his leadership. By mid-1836 Shamil had enough power to begin organizing administration and taxation. The Russians began to worry. On 26 July Pullo captured Zandak with a ‘terrible massacre’ and Reoute entered Dagestan, but accomplished nothing. In October Shamil tried negotiations, but the Russians demanded near complete surrender.

1837, February: Klugenau's Ashitla Bridge campaign: General Fese, who was operating in Chechnya, ordered Klugenau to make a demonstration into Dagestan to distract Shamil. Klugenau chose the ‘Ashitla bridge’ across the Avar Koysu just north of Gimry which led west to Ashitla on the Andi Koysu. On 27 February 1837 Klugenau reached Karanai (10 km NE) with 843 men. From here a path led 5000 feet down to the Avar Koysu canyon. By 1 March he was halfway down at a place called the Spring of Gimry. He sent Avramenko a mile or two ahead to the east side of the bridge. The enemy appeared in force on the west side and it seemed that the two forces could not safely link up. The men of Gimry and Untsukul appeared to be gathering for an attack. Klugenau ordered Avramenko to retreat under cover of darkness. Major-General Count Ivelich, against orders, went to the bridge and took command by right of seniority. Ivelich ordered a daylight retreat, the mountaineers swarmed across the bridge and most of advanced party were killed including Ivelich and Avramenko. A few refugees managed to fight their way back to Karanai. On 3 March Klugenau was back at Karanai and learned of Avriminko's disaster.

1837, June: Fese's Ashitla-Tilitl campaign: Akhmet Khan of Mekhtuli (?modern Dzhengutai, 33 km E), the temporary ruler of the Avar Khanate, fearing Shamil, arranged for the Russians to occupy Khunzakh. On 29 May 5000 Russians reached Khunzakh from Temir-Khan-Shura, having taken 20 days and building a road as they went. On 5 June Fese left Khunzakh for Shamil's headquarters at Ashitla (9 km W on the Andi Koysu). Untsukul submitted and on 8 June he was on the Betl plateau overlooking Ashitla. Here he detached a battalion to deal with Tilitl (see below). The next day they crossed the Betl River and came to Ashitla which was occupied by 2000 Murids. The village was taken by 2PM with a good deal of house-to-house fighting, but the Russian losses were only 28 killed and 156 wounded. They counted 87 enemy dead, but many were probably carried away. No prisoners were taken. Some Murids retreated north of the river and some east to Old Akhulgo where many were killed and 78 taken prisoner. The vineyards and orchards around Ashitla were devastated. A fresh horde of mountaineers, said to be 12,000, appeared near Igali and Fese, around the 15th, performed a "strategic movement to the rear", losing 7 officers and 160 men. Meanwhile, Shamil was besieged in Tilitl (probably Teletl', 37 km S). On 7 June he had made a sortie, both sides losing about 300 men, which was a significant share of their forces. Fese reached Tilitl on 26 June. Tilitl had 600 houses, nine towers, steep slopes on three sides and a cliff behind. The towers were soon blasted by artillery and a general assault was made on 5 July. Half the village was gained with much slaughter and Shamil sent envoys to treat for peace. An agreement was made that neither side would attack the other, which amounted to a Russian recognition of Shamil's sovereignty. Fese withdrew on the 7th and reached Khunzakh on the 10th. Fese's withdrawal at a point of near victory is explained by the condition of his army. He had lost 1000 men, most of his horses and wagons, his soldiers needed boots and he was short of ammunition. Fese claimed he had won and Shamil presented his retreat as divine intervention. Shamil went north, surveyed the ruins of Ashitla and set about building a stronger fort at Akhulgo (9 km NW on the Andi Koysu).

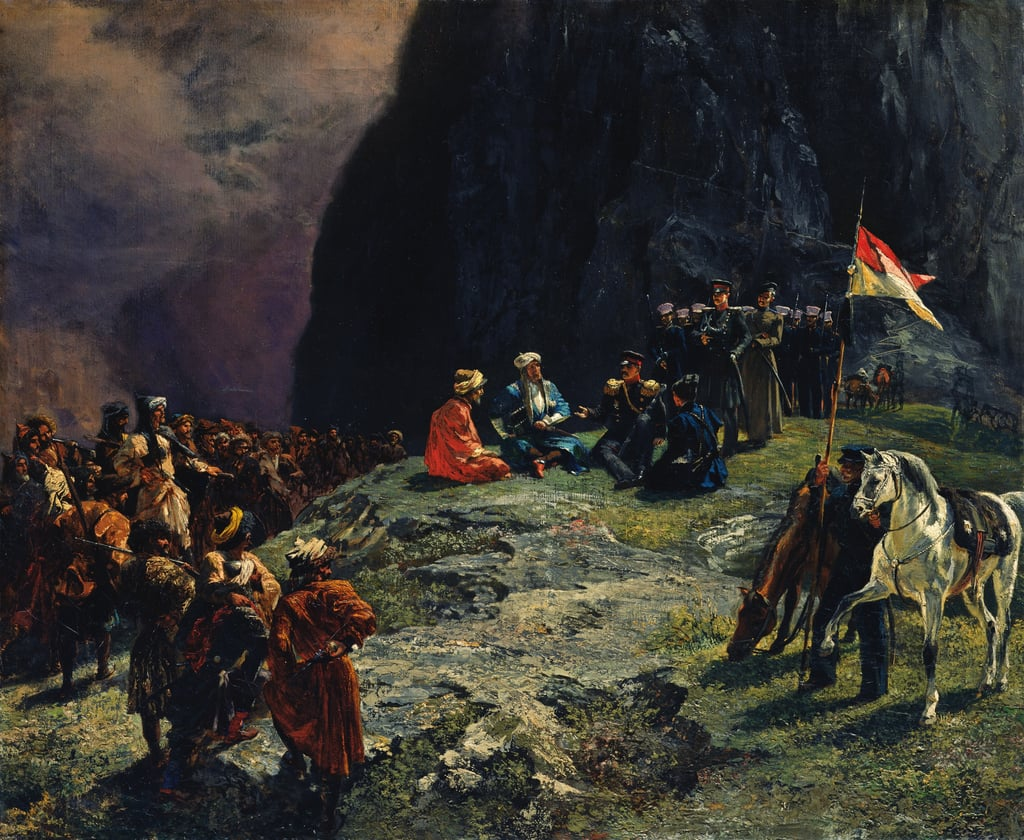
Klugenau meets Shamil

1837, September: Klugenau meets Shamil: Nicholas I was expected in the Caucasus in the autumn and it was hoped that he and Shamil could make some arrangement. On 18 September Klugenau met Shamil at the Spring of Gimry. With Klugenau were Yevdokimov, 15 Don Cossacks and 10 natives while Shamil had 200 horsemen. The negotiations got nowhere. At 3PM Klugenau rose to leave and extended his hand to Shamil. His arm was seized by Surkhai Khan who exclaimed that it was not fitting for the Imam to touch the hand of an unbeliever. Klugenau raised his crutch to strike, Surkhai half drew a dagger and Shamil stepped in to separate them. Yevdokimov led the angered Klugenau off and the two sides parted. Klugenau wrote a letter suggesting more negotiations and on 28 September Shamil replied that he could do nothing given what he knew of Russian treachery.

Nicholas I inspected the Caucasus in September and October. He replaced Rosen with Golovin and gave Dagestan and Chechnya a higher priority.

1838 was a quiet year. Shamil spent the time consolidating his power and strengthening Akhulgo.

1839: The Samur campaign under Golovin was one of the most successful of the whole war. The whole Samur River (140 km S – 180 km SE) valley was occupied and a chain of forts built, notably a large one at Akhti (170 km SSE). A road was begun from near Akhti west across the mountain crest to Georgia which shortened the route from Georgia to Dagestan by 300 kilometers. The villages were ruled wisely, remained at peace and served as a useful base for further operations.

1839: Akhulgo: Grabbe besieged Shamil at the rock fortress of Akhulgo (10 km WNW on the Andi Koysu) for 80 days. On the night of its fall (21 August 1839) he escaped with a few followers. See Siege of Akhoulgo.

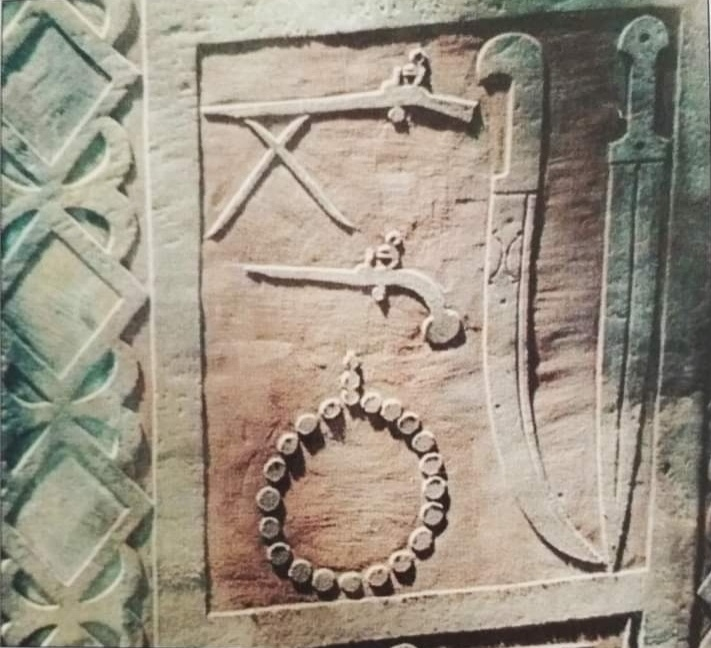
Picture of a tombstone in the cemetery of Lechi-Yurt featuring a shashqa with the Gurda trademark (1841). Warriors Cemetery who died during Caucasian war. Chechen Republic.

1840: Shamil moves to Chechnya: Shamil arrived in the Chechen forests with seven followers and established himself at "one of the smaller Chechen communities". (Shamil was an Avar and the English sources do not explain how he dealt with the language difference.) The Russians thought they had almost won. General Pullo marched through lower Chechnya receiving the submission of many villages, but his methods were harsh and created resentment. The rumor spread that the Chechens were to be disarmed and converted into peasants on the Russian model. Six months after the fall of Akhulgo the Imamate was re-established in Chechnya and Shamil's troops was fighting near Grozny (115 km NW). That summer Akhverdi Mahoma raided near Mozdok (200 km NW) and carried off Shuanet who became Shamil's favorite wife. In June Shamil was nearly killed. He raided a disloyal Ingush village near Mozdok and demanded the release of two Chechen prisoners held by a man named Gubish. When he refused Shamil had his right eye gouged out. That night Gubish killed his sleeping guard, entered Shamil's tent and stabbed him several times before he and his brothers were cut down. The rest of his family were shut up in their house and burnt alive. The minor Battle of the Valerik River, made memorable by Lermontov's poem, occurred on 11 July. Shamil invaded Dagestan, fought Klugenau at Ishkati, and withdrew. On 14 September Klugenau stormed Gimry.

Haji Murad: Since his murder of Hamzad in 1834 Hadji Murad had had little choice but to side with the Russians. But now he attracted the hostility of Akhmet of Mekhtuli, the temporary Khan of Avaria. He denounced him to the Russians who arrested him and sent him to Temir-Khan-Shura. The main road being blocked with snow they took a mountain path. At one point near Butsra (7 km NE of Khunzakh?) the path was so narrow that they could only go single file. He broke free and jumped off the cliff, landing in a snowbank and breaking his leg. He crawled to a sheep farm where he recovered and later reported to Shamil, becoming one of his best warriors. By the end of the year both sides were exhausted and retired to winter quarters.

1841: Lower Chechnya was again ravished, without much military effect. Chirkey (about 25 km N, now under the Chirkey Reservoir) was taken and Fort Evgenevskoye was built nearby. Haji Murad recovered and established himself at Tselmes (30 km SW) near Khunzakh. 2000 men went after him. General Bakunin, a St Petersburg artillery general who was in the Caucasus on a tour of inspection, took command. On 5 February the aul was almost taken, Bakunin, Haji Murad's father and two brothers were killed, but the Russians lost a third of their men and Passek led a successful retreat. By the end of October the Russians called off a planned attack in Chechnya to reinforce Dagestan.

1842: Grabbe's failure: Fese captured Gergebil (35 km ESE) on 20 February and recovered much of Avaria. On 21 March Shamil raided Kazikumukh and captured the ruling family and the Russian resident. At the end of May Grabbe took advantage of Shamil's absence and marched on Dargo, which had become Shamil's capital (Battle of Ichkeria). His losses in the forest were so heavy that he was forced to retreat. He next tried an attack in Igali (25 km W on the Andi Koysu) via Tsatanikh (14 km SW) and retreated with a loss of 286 men, the enemy being estimated at only 300. In the period 1839–42 the Russians had lost 436 officers and 7960 men killed and wounded, mostly under Grabbe. Grabbe was recalled at his own request and Golovin was replaced by Neidhardt. Soon after his appointment Neidhardt set a price on Shamil's head, the reward being the weight of Shamil's head in gold. Shamil sent him a letter saying that he was honored that Neidhardt valued his head so highly, but, unfortunately, he could not reciprocate and would not give a straw for Neidhartd's head.

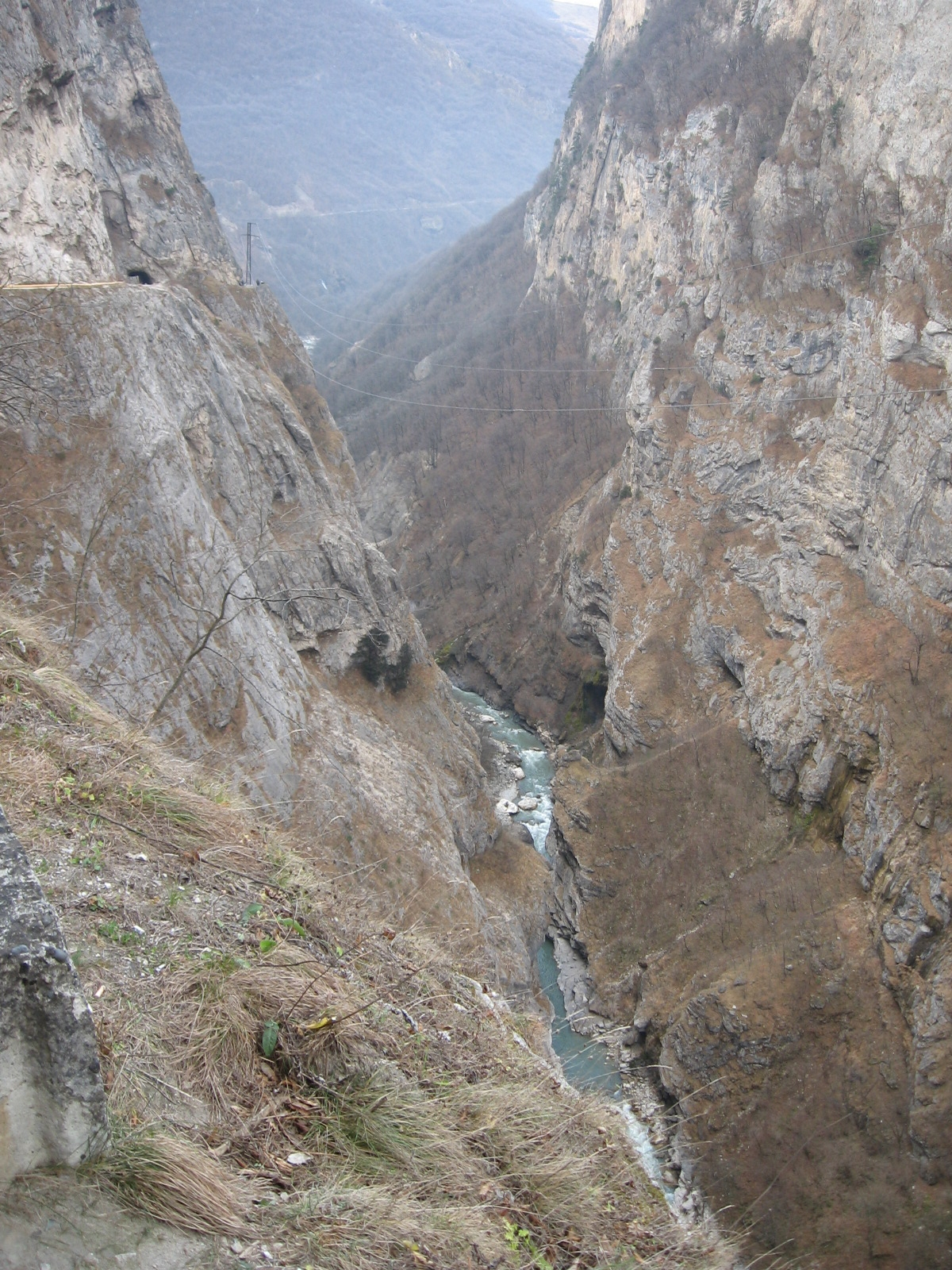
A gorge in the north Caucasus. This one is on the Cherek River west of Vladikavkaz.

1843: Shamil regains Dagestan: By this time Shamil had built up a standing army of horsemen called murtazeks, each supported by ten households. It is said that he was now followed around by his private executioner who carried a long-handled beheading axe. It seems that both sides were putting increasing pressure on the non-combatants caught between them. Neidhardt was told not to attempt major campaigns and concentrate on fort-building and road-cutting.

Untsukul (8 km SW) had declared against Shamil and admitted a Russian garrison. On 28 August Shamil reached Untsukul from Dylym (50 miles in 24 hours), Kibit Mahoma from Tilitl (40 km SW) and Haji Murad from Avaria, for a united force of 10,000 men. This coordinated movement, undetected by the Russians, is a measure of Shamil's military skill. The local Russian garrisons – Gimry, Tsatanikh and Kharachi – rushed to the area. (Baddeley does not explain where these garrisons came from.) They totaled something over 500 men and 486 of them were killed. Yevdokimov came with more troops, but was prevented by the garrisons’ rash action from joining them and watched their destruction from afar. Klugenau approached with 1100 men, saw his communications threatened and retired to Khunzakh where he was besieged until he was relieved by Argutinsky from the south. In the 25 days since the start of the campaign Shamil held every Russian fort in Avaria except the capital and the Russians had lost 2060 men and 14 guns. Choosing not to attack the 6000 Russians at Khunzakh, Shamil retired to Dylym.

Shamil's men attacked near Fort Vnezapnaya (50 km N) and drew off. Gurko thought he was planning a move northeast and moved his forces there. Shamil saw that only Gergebil (40 km SE) held the road from Temir-Khan-Shura to Khunzakh. On 28 October Kirbit Mahoma besieged Gergebil. Gurko gathered 1600 men and marched to the rescue. On 6 November he surveyed the village from the mountain above, saw that the task was impossible and withdrew, leaving the garrison to its fate. Passek withdrew from Khunzakh to Zirani (20 km SE) where he was besieged for a month. A murid force reached the coast near Tarki. On the 11th Shamil blockaded Gurko in Temir-Khan-Shura. By the 17th every Russian force in north Dagestan was shut up in one of four forts. The only hope was Freitag in the north and Argutinsky in the south. Argutinsky had dismissed his men to winter quarters and by the time he gathered them snow had blocked the mountains. Freitag rescued the garrison at Nizovoye on the coast and on 14 Dec entered Temir-Khan-Shura with six and a half battalions. Shamil was beaten nearby and Gurko left to rescue Passek at Zirani. Passek broke out and joined Gurko in the Irganai canyon of the Avar Koysu. Both sides now dispersed. Since 27 August the Russian loss was 92 officers, 2528 men, 12 forts, 27 guns, 2152 muskets, 13816 shells, 819 kilograms of gunpowder and hundreds of horses.

The story of Shamil and his mother: While Shamil was away in Dagestan the villages of lower Chechnya were under heavy pressure. Several of them resolved to ask permission to temporarily surrender. Since anyone who made such a suggestion was likely to be punished the ambassadors were chosen by lot. They approached Shamil's mother and offered a sum of 2000 rubles. The next morning Shamil announced that he had received a cowardly suggestion and that he must retire to the mosque to pray and fast until the Prophet himself told him what to do. Three days later he emerged and announced that it was the will of Allah that the person who made the suggestion should receive one hundred blows and that that person was his own mother. After the fifth blow the old lady fainted and Shamil took the remaining ninety-five blows himself. He then summoned the ambassadors and told them to go back to their villages and report everything they had seen and heard.

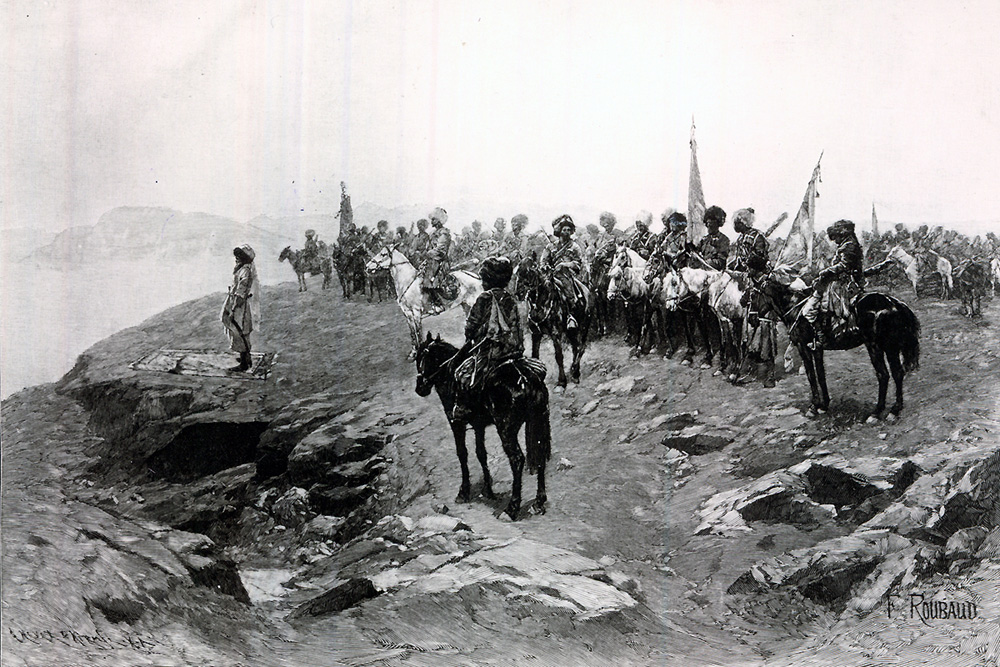
Chamil’s prayer before the battle (On horseback murid), by Franz Roubaud 1896.

1844: Dagestan stabilized: At the end of 1843 Nicholas ordered Neidhardt, who replaced Golovin in 1842, to scatter Shamil's hordes and occupy the mountains. To this end he sent 26 battalions and four regiments of Cossacks who in no case were to remain beyond the end of the year. The murids were pushed from the Caspian coast. On 3 June Passek won at Gilli, 1400 men defeating 27000, it is said. Argutinsky won on the upper Samur, Chirkey was destroyed, Shamil was defeated at Akusha (70 km SE), and an attack on Tilitl (40? km SW) failed. One of Shamil's friends was killed in a blood-feud at the aul of Tsonteri. Shamil demanded hostages and when the villagers refused he swooped down on the village, persuaded the villagers to surrender and massacred every one of them, one hundred families in all. Daniel Beg, Sultan of Elisu (150 km SSE near the mountain crest between Dagestan and Georgia), had been a faithful vassal of Russia. Neidhardt tried to limit his power and he revolted. Although his capital was quickly occupied, he escaped and brought over large parts of southern Dagestan. Vozdvizhenskoye, a fort on the Argun River, was begun. By the end of the year the frontiers were stabilized but nothing significant was accomplished.

1845: The Dargo disaster: Nicholas left the extra troops in the Caucasus for another year, replaced Neidhardt with Vorontsov and made ambitious demands. Vorontsov doubted but obeyed. He planned to move through the mountains and attack Dargo from the south. (It is not clear when Dargo became Shamil's capital. He had previously been at Dylym and other places.) The mountain campaign worked but as soon as he entered the Chechen forests losses became excessive and he was barely able to fight his way out to the north. See Battle of Dargo (1845). In this year Shamil killed 33 prisoners for the crime of receiving a letter baked in a loaf of bread.

1846: West to Kabardia: Vorontsov had learned his lesson and planned to remain on the defensive but Shamil had other ideas. The western border of his realm was the Georgian Military Highway. To the west lay Kabardia. These people were like the Circassians, but with a ‘feudal’ social system. They were said to be some of the best fighters in the Caucasus, but had remained quiet since 1822. If he could gain Kabardia he could block the Military Highway and possibly link up with the Circassians, uniting the whole north Caucasus from sea to sea. In early April Freitag got wind that something was brewing and, against explicit orders from the Czar and Vorontsov, retained several battalions that were scheduled for withdrawal. Shamil crossed the Argun on the 13th, having perhaps 14000 men against Freitag's 7000. Shamil had only 1000 infantry, 8000 infantry having been sent to Nur Ali (see below), Freitag went after him. With genius, or luck, he dogged Shamil's heels, never quite knowing where he was. Shamil crossed the Terek on the 17th or 18th. Freitag held the east bank, hoping to cut him off from his base. Shamil was now in Kabardia. The plan was for the Kabardians to rise and the united force to attack the Russians. Seeing Freitag already there, the Kabardians hesitated, Shamil waited on the Kabardians and since each side waited on the other, neither did anything. Freitag crossed to the River Cherek and there were various maneuvers. On the 25th Shamil learned that troops were moving north from Georgia on the Military Highway. This proved that Nur Ali had failed. The plan had been for Nur Ali to raise the Galgai clans, advance from Tsori to Dzheyrakh (175 km W) and block the Darial defile. General Gurko, on his way home to Russia, took command at Vladikavkaz, called troops from Georgia and guarded the road so well that Nur Ali gave up. Shamil abandoned his tents and turned east. Outmaneuvering a Russian force, he crossed the Terek and by the 28th was safe.

The murids bombarded Grozny in July and Vozdvizhenskoye in August. Haji Murad raided 158 horses and 188 head of cattle from Temir-Khan-Shura and later captured the widow of Akhmet Khan from Mekhtuli. Shamil entered Dagestan and was routed by Vasili Bebutov, the Russians capturing his personal kinzhal (dagger). Shamil was defeated at Akusha and the whole district returned to Russia. The Russians made considerable progress building forts. In this relatively quiet year they lost 1500 men killed, wounded or missing.

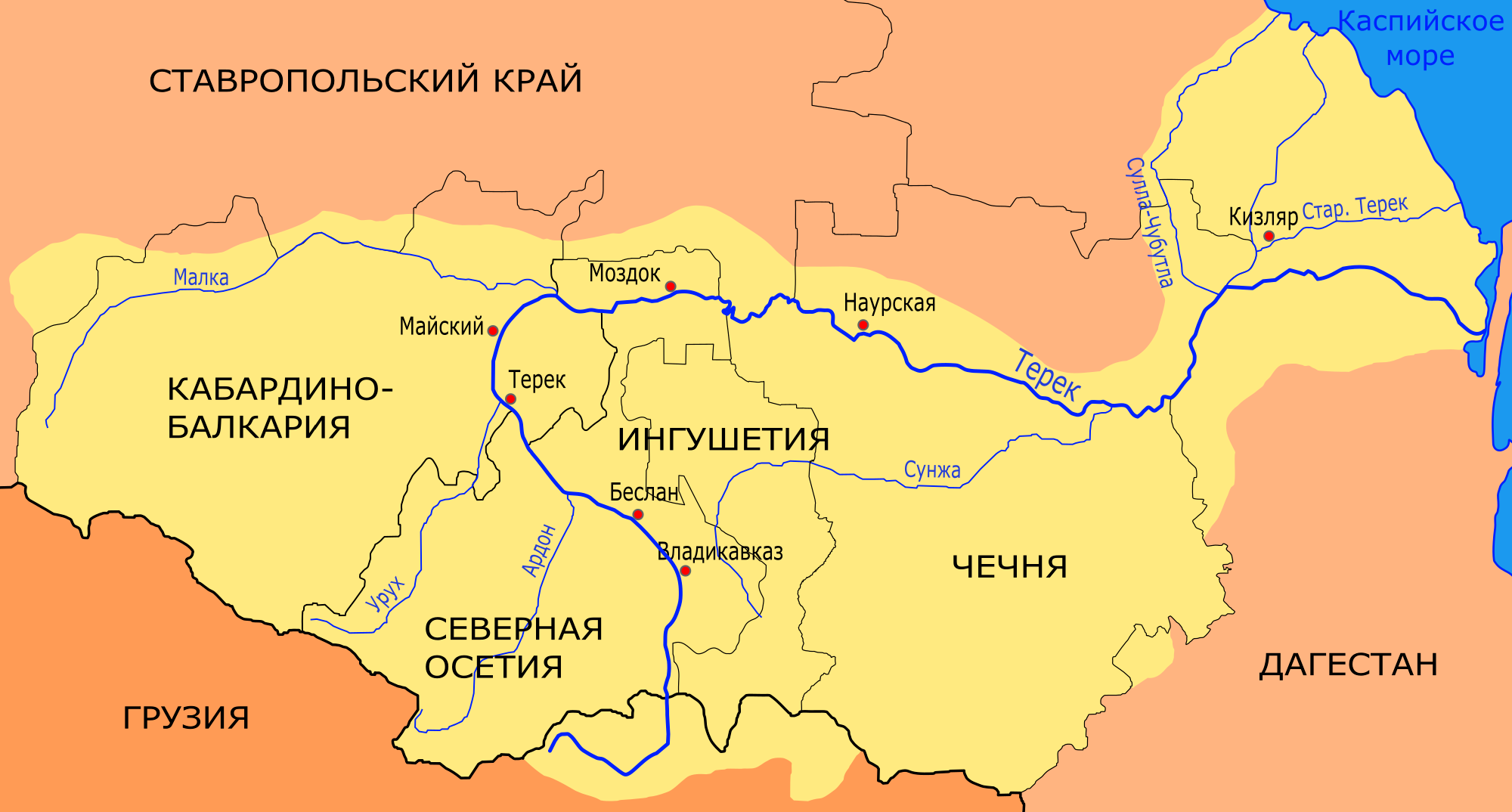
The northwestern bulge of the Terek River was the main area of forest clearing and Cossack settlement

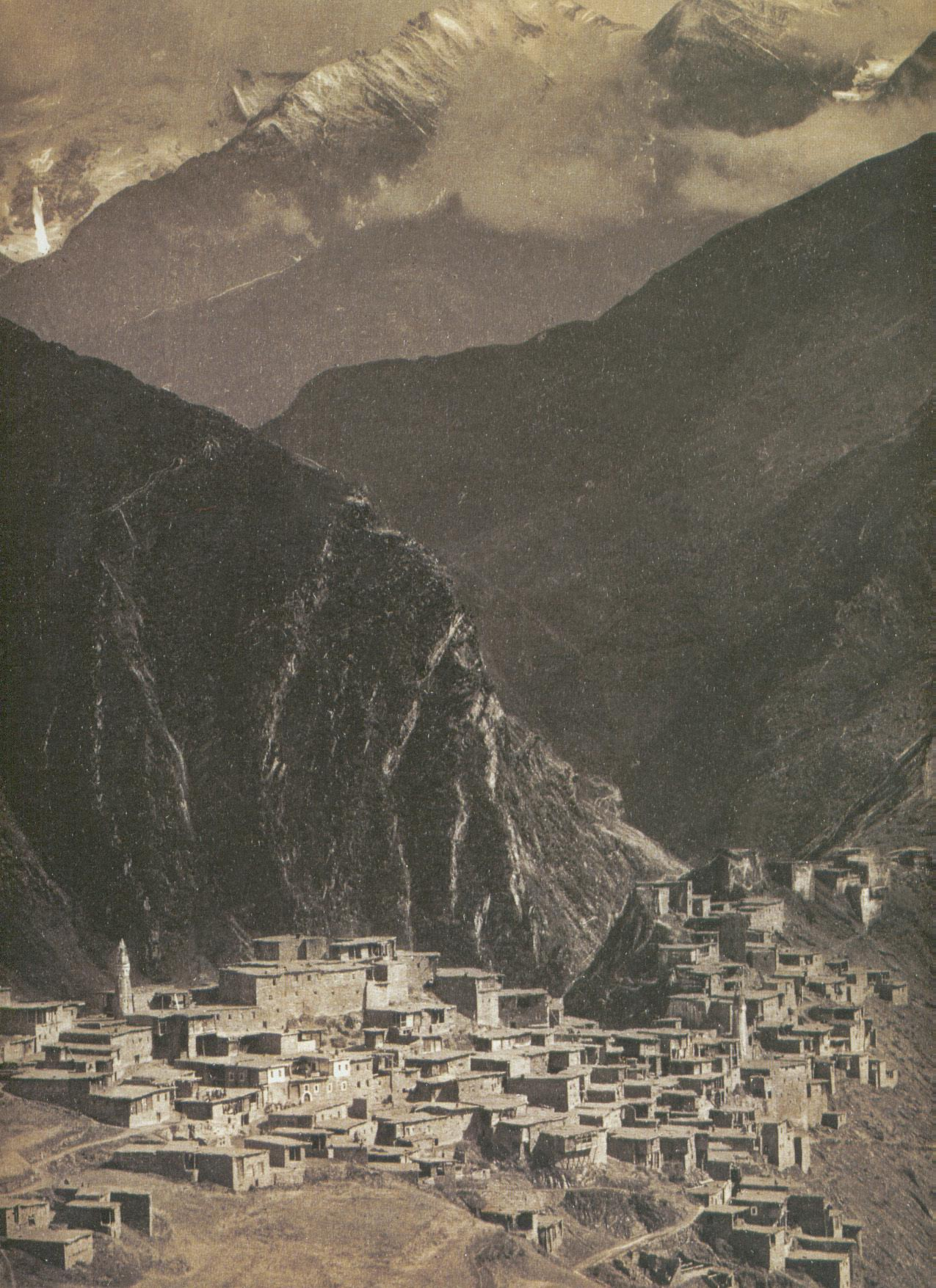
Tindi, a semi-fortified village. Image circa 1890

1845–1850: Road Cutting: Gammer, if not Baddeley, sees this as a major period of road-cutting and forest-clearing, especially in Lesser Chechnya south and west of Grozny. Much of the population was concentrated around Russian forts, moved north of the Terek, or driven deeper into the mountains.

1847: Gergebil: By this time Shamil had established himself at Veden (65 km WNW), one valley west of Dargo. Vorontsov planned to push west and occupy the line of the Kazikumukh Koysu, thereby cutting off the fertile eastern side of Dagestan. There were also rumors of coal in the area. If this could be found a large force could be kept in the mountains over winter. He therefore planned take Gergebil and build a fort there. This aul is on the east side of a canyon at the junction of the Kara and Kazikumukh Koysus at the mouth of the narrow Aymyaki canyon that leads east up to the plateau. It was built on a rock with stone houses rising up the sides like stairs. It was surrounded by a wall 14 feet high and 5 feet thick, the houses had loopholes to cover each other, there were two towers and internal barricades. Vorontsov knew all this and went ahead anyway. He arrived on 1 June and a day or so later Shamil appeared on the opposite cliff to watch the action. Artillery breached the wall and since there was little return fire it appeared that the place was weakly held. On the morning of 4 June the breach was stormed and drew withering fire. With ladders they reached the roofs of the first tier of houses, the roofs gave way and they were slaughtered by the murids waiting below. The Avars had replaced the real roofs with thin frames that were meant to collapse when anyone walked on them. The assault continued, the troops broke up into small parties fighting in the houses and crooked streets and it became necessary to retreat. A second assault was made with the same result. The day's loss was 36 officers and 581 men. The siege continued for four days, cholera broke out and Vorontsov, short of shells and glad of an excuse, retired south up the Kazikumukh Koysu. The lesson of Gergebil was that these fortified villages should not be stormed without major artillery preparation.

Vorontsov turned his attention to Salti (45 km S) and gathered vast quantities of siege material. After a seven-week siege he stormed the place on the third attempt with a loss of 2000 men.

1848: In June Argutinsky returned to Gergebil with 10000 men and 46 guns. 10,000 shells were fired. After a 23-day siege the murids withdrew by night, losing perhaps 1000 men against the Russian's 80 dead and 271 wounded. The place could not be held and the Russians withdrew, fortifying the east end to the Aymyaki canyon.

In September Akhti (170 km S) and its 500-man garrison were besieged for a week by Shamil, Daniel Sultan and Haji Murad. The situation looked hopeless. The women of the fort joined the fighting, including the captain's daughter whom Shamil had promised to the first man over the wall. Argutinsky appeared with a relieving force, saw no way to cross the Samur and withdrew as the garrison watched. He then made a wide swing and relieved Akhti from the opposite side.

1849–1856: In this period both sides stood on the defensive and there were few major battles. The Russians strengthened their lines on all sides and Shamil became increasingly despotic. Kirbit Mahoma built a new fortress at Chokh (55 km S). Argutinsky fired 22000 shells at it and gave up. The road from Akhti west to Georgia was completed, including, it is said, the first tunnel ever built in Russia.

Haji Murad: On 14 April 1849 Haji Murad raided Temir-Khan-Shura, the chief military center in Russian Dagestan. He got inside the town and withdrew after a sharp skirmish. In 1850 he raided Georgia and in 1851 Tabassaran. In that year he killed the brother of the Shamkal of Tarki and carried off his wife and children, for whom Shamil obtained a heavy ransom. At one point he falsely told the villagers that a Russian supply train was the remnant of a defeated army which they could easily loot, which they did. His fame was such that, it is said, a score or so murids drove off 1500 native militia by attacking while shouting "Haji Murad! Haji Murad!" Shamil, who had recently proclaimed his son Kazi Muhammad his successor, saw Haji Murad as a threat to his family and possibly himself and secretly sentenced him to death. Warned, Haji fled to the Russians. He was kept in a sort of honorable captivity at Tiflis, but his family was at Tselmes in Shamil's power. He later went to a place called Nukha. One morning he and a few followers galloped off and disappeared. One of the local commanders guessed that he would follow the same road that he used in his 1850 raid. Two days later (23 April 1852) he was surrounded and killed.

On 27 February 1851, for the first and only time, Shamil used his nizam or European-style infantry, sending 5000–6000 men against 4500 Russian infantry, 1600 cavalry and 24 guns. He lost.

In 1852 Baryatinsky became head of the Left Flank and again devastated lowland Chechnya, without much benefit to Russia. His new policy was to fire warning shots before attacking a village, allowing the women and children to get out of the way. "This improved the morals of the soldiers," a comment that may give some idea of what a raid was like. Forest cutting continued and Cossack colonies were strengthened and advanced. The lowland Chechens were gradually driven north or south, creating a belt of uninhabited country between the two sides. This was worse for Shamil since this was the best agricultural land. Tolstoy was in the Caucasus at this time, leading to such stories as "The Cossacks" and "The Raid".

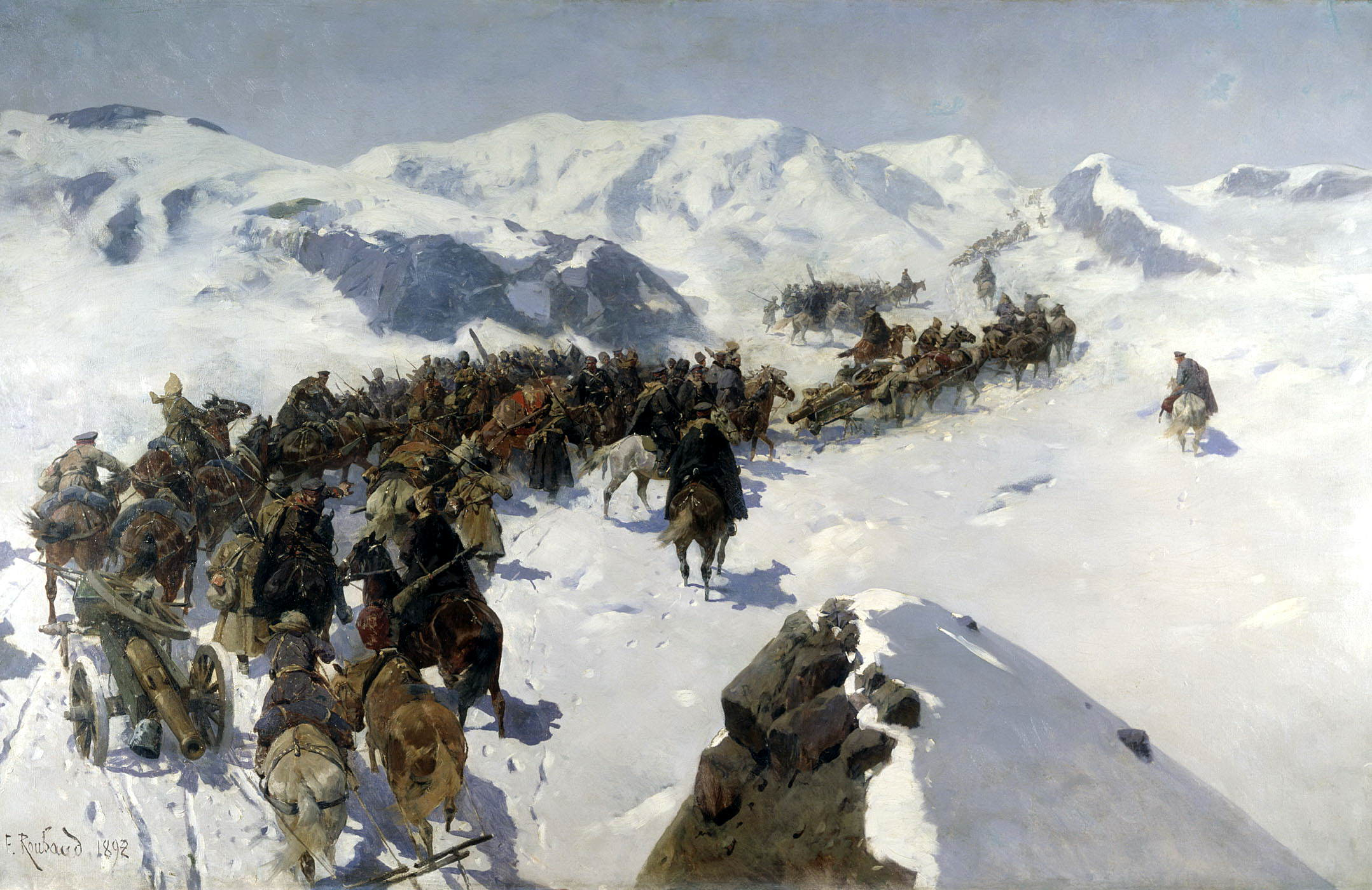
Argutinsky crosses the mountains

The Crimean War (1853–1856): was a lost opportunity. The Turks could have sent troops, the British could have sent guns, the Russians might have withdrawn troops, Shamil might have used the opportunity, but none of this happened. The Turks had an agent in Circassia called Omar Pasha, but Shamil broke with him.

The Georgian Princesses and Shamil's Son: In August 1853 Shamil and 15000 men raided Georgia but were driven back by Argutinsky who crossed the snow-covered mountains from Akhti. Next summer he was more successful, but was beaten by Prince David Chavchavadze at Shildi, losing 500 men. The next day (4 July 1854) his son Kazi Muhammad raided the Prince's country seat and carried off his wife and sister-in-law, the granddaughters of the last king of Georgia. They were taken to Veden and held for eight months. Their account is one of the few sources we have for Shamil's domestic arrangements. At Akhulgo in 1839 Shamil had given his 12-year-old son as a hostage. The boy was made a cadet in the Russian army and was by now a lieutenant. On 10 March 1855, on the banks of the River Michik (35 km north of Veden), he was exchanged for the princesses and 40000 rubles. The boy had grown to manhood in Russia and was now a stranger in the land of his birth. His younger brother Kazi Muhammad took charge of him, but he could not adapt to mountain ways and died three years later.

=== The end (1857–1859) ===
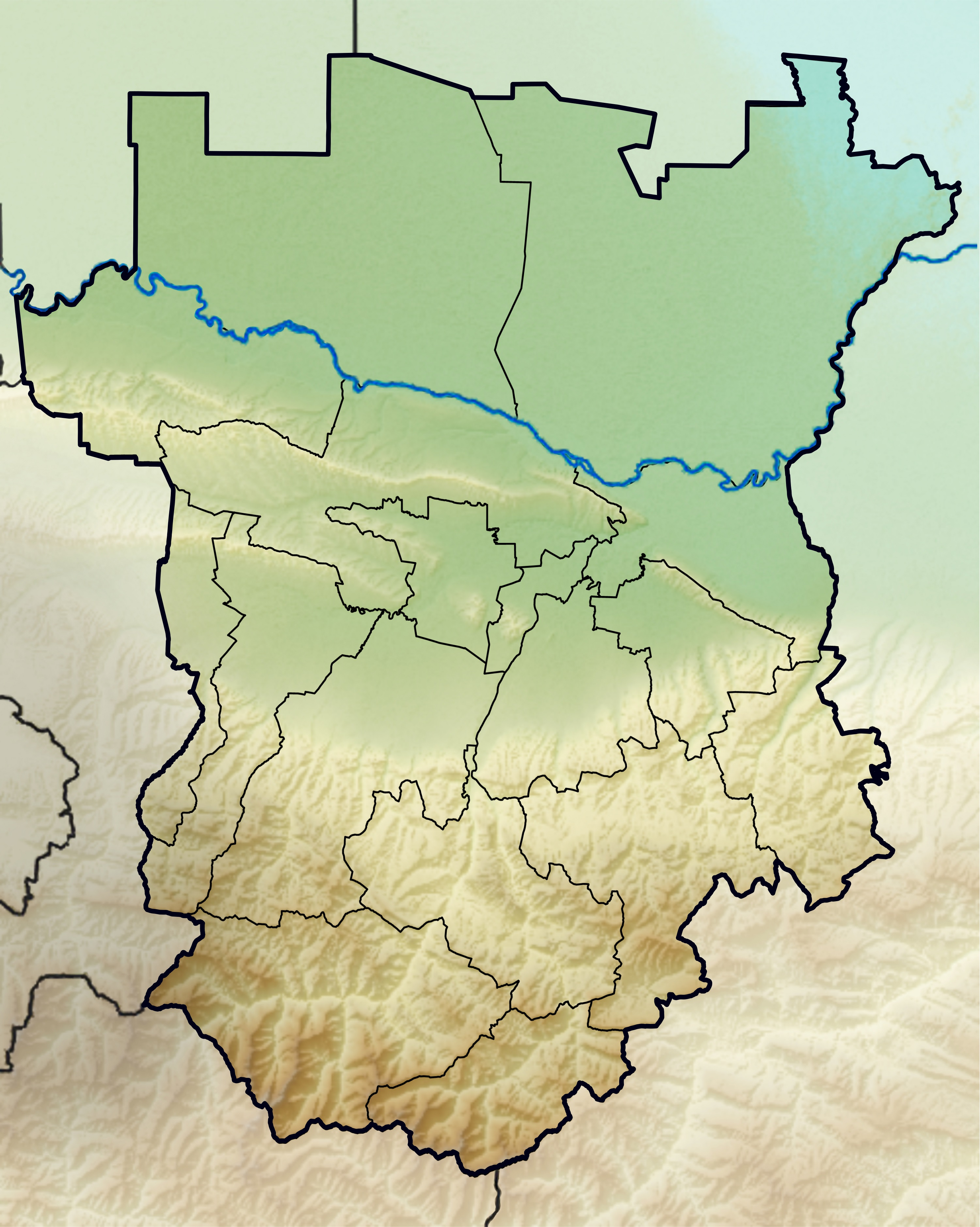
1858: Chechnya bisected
Blue dots are on the Argun River.

With the end of the Crimean War (March 1856) Russia was free to turn its full attention to the Caucasus. On 22 July 1856 Prince Baryatinsky was appointed both Viceroy and commander-in-chief and set about reorganizing the armies. The general plan for the future was for the northern army to move southeast through Chechnya and link up with the Dagestan army in the Andi Koysu valley while the southern army moved northward. In 1857 Orbelyani moved west and by November had a fort at Burtunai (25 km NW) in the eastern edge of the Chechen forest with access by cleared roads and another road north to Dylym. Late in the year he destroyed much of the surrounding area as a diversion for Yevdokimov's campaign (below).

==== 1858: Yevdokimov takes the Argun ====
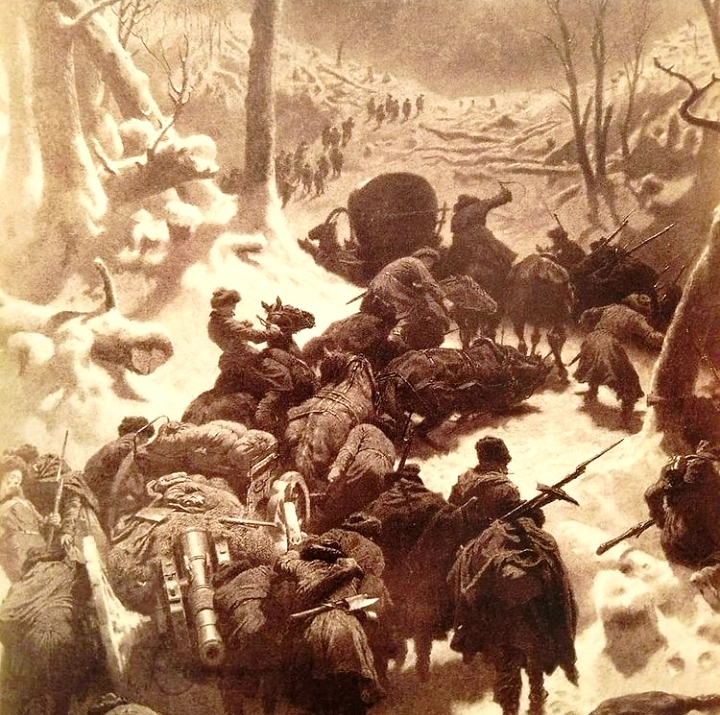
Expedition to the Vedeno (Chechnya), by Theodor Horschelt 1859.

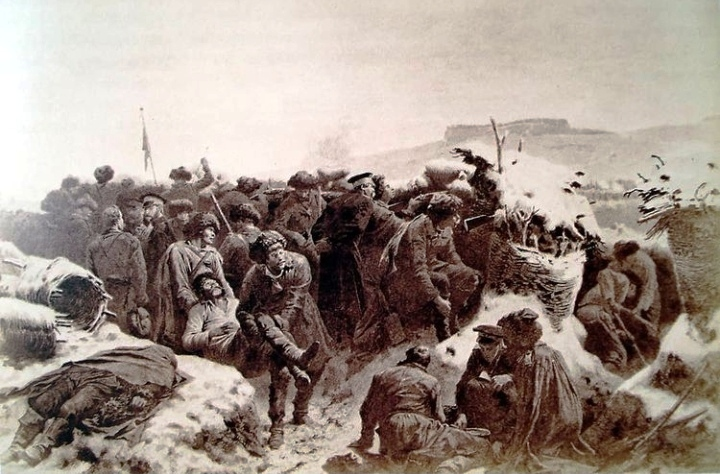
The siege of Vedenya, by Theodor Horschelt 1859

In 1858 the goal was to occupy the Argun River, a north-flowing river 90 km east of the Georgian Military Highway and 35 km west of Veden, thereby cutting off western Chechnya. Unusually for the Caucasus, Shamil never learned of plan. On 15 January 1858 Yevdokimov left Berdikel on the lower Argun. Marching through deep snow he reached Fort Vozdvizhenskoye at the bottom of the first defile. A column marched up the east bank and met valiant resistance, which collapsed when the murids saw an even larger army moving up the opposite bank. The Russians occupied the defile and camped near the modern Dachu-Barzoi where they built Fort Argutinskoye. The axe now replaced the gun. The surrounding auls were burnt, roads and bridges built and trees were cut in all directions. An avenue 1400 yards wide was cut to the crest of the 6000-foot eastern mountain from which one could see Shamil's capital at Veden 10 miles east. Oddly, Shamil remained inactive. Five months later (1 July) the Russians moved on the second 10-mile defile. The murids had fortified it with earthworks and fallen trees. Yevdokimov feinted in that direction and suddenly crossed the river and occupied the western mountain at Lesser Veranda. From there he re-crossed the river to Zonakh, gaining the lower half of the defile. Again they turned to the axe, cutting trees and building roads. On 30 July they broke through south to Greater Veranda, thereby outflanking the defile. They moved down to Shatoy and then north to occupy the second defile. The murids burnt all the auls still in their hands and compelled the inhabitants to retreat with them to Veden. This provoked such anger in the local population that the invader's task became easy. The people of Itum Kale at the head of the third defile revolted and invited the Russians in. Two companies passed the third defile and were hailed as deliverers. The whole Argun was now in Russian hands. Meanwhile, the Russians tried to gather the Ingush around Nazran into a few large settlements. Nazran revolted. Shamil crossed the Argun under Russian fire, could not reach Nazran, and drew back. Six weeks later he tried again with 4000 horsemen. He was defeated, losing 370 dead and 1500 weapons against 16 Russians killed.

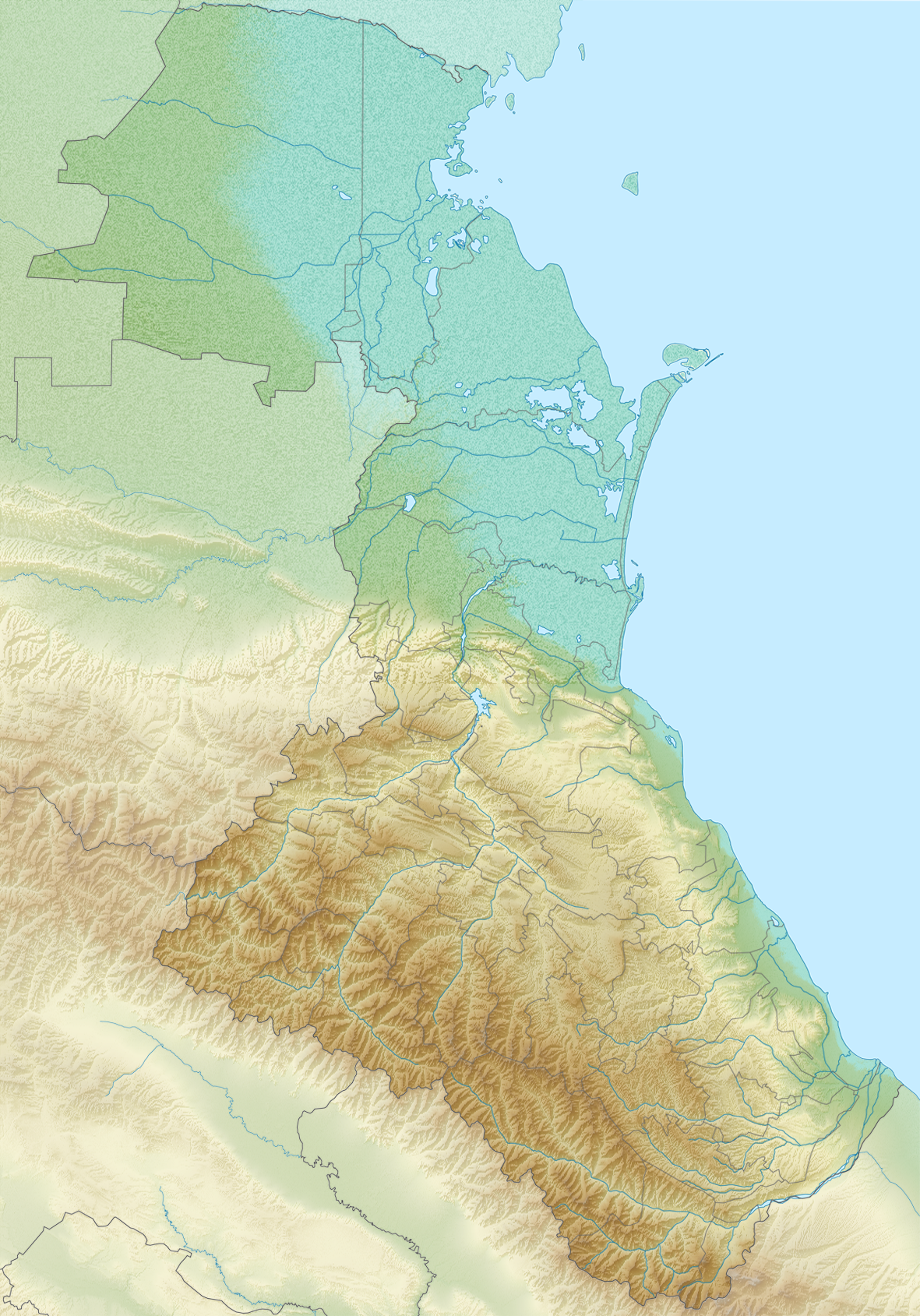
1859: Collapse. The Andi Koysu is approximately the line Ichichali – Gimry

==== 1859: Collapse ====
The plan for 1859 was for Yevdokimov to move east and meet Wrangel from Butunai somewhere south of Veden. Instead Yevdokimov cautiously encircled Veden and after a two-month siege took it by storm with small loss (1 April). Shamil, who had been in the neighborhood, retreated south. It now seemed that all was lost and many auls and leaders began to submit. This included most of the Chechen forest, Daniel Beg of Elisu and Kirbit Mahoma at Tilitl. Driven from Chechnya, Shamil tried to hold a line along the Andi Koysu, fortifying Ichichali (36 km west and 7 km north of the river) and some other places. On 14 July, Viceroy Baryatinsky joined Yevdokimov and the advance began. They now had about 40000 men. When they appeared on the heights above Botlikh (50 km W), resistance collapsed. Kazi Muhammad, learning that Wrangel had crossed the Andi near Igali (15 July) abandoned his forts and withdrew south to Karata (45 km WSW). Another column occupied the Avar Koysu near Irgani and Leven Melikov arrived from the south at Botlikh. By late July the following surrendered: Ullu Kala, the new fort near Gergebil, Tilitl, Chokh and Irib. Shamil fled from Karata to Gunib (50 km S). On the road the baggage and treasure train of the once-dreaded Imam was twice plundered and he and 400 followers arrived at Gunib with only what they could carry. Wrangle reached Gunib on 9 August and the siege began. The next day Baryatinsky began a triumphal tour of the submitted territory and reached Gunib on the 18th. Gunib, like many places in Dagestan, was a natural fortress, but its natural perimeter was too long for only 400 men to hold. If assaulted from several directions, as it was, one group or the other was bound to break through. The assault began on 25 August and was successful. One group of 100 murids was surrounded and died to a man. Baryatinsky halted and tried negotiations. Shamil now had about 50 men. He could have died fighting, but he had his wives and children with him and chose surrender (25 August 1859). He went into honorable exile at Kaluga and died on a pilgrimage to Mecca in 1871. The Russians now turned their attention to Circassia, which fell in 1864.

==== Reasons for the collapse ====
Given the size of the Russian army, Shamil's cause was always hopeless. The only question was when. Like many champions of liberty, he soon resorted to tyranny, which toward the end became counter-productive. His inactivity in the last years of the war and his willingness to surrender raises questions about his morale. In the last years he left parts of the command to his son Kazi Muhammad, who proved incompetent. The excessive concentration of power in his own hands meant that his cause collapsed when he surrendered. Village independence and local feuds made the mountaineers excellent fighters. Shamil's attempt to unite them and turn their fighting outward was always somewhat unnatural. His rather egalitarian theocracy clashed with the more aristocratic and religiously lax systems of the Kabardians and the Dagestan Khanates, which made expansion difficult. The strain of constant fighting began to tell on the population. Especially in lowland Chechnya, reprisals led some people to fear both sides equally. Years of forest clearing and depopulation in Chechnya reduced the agricultural land and made penetration easier. Yevdokimov's policy of outflanking the enemy was important. The murids could be desperately brave in a frontal attack, but became demoralized when out-maneuvered and forced to abandon prepared positions. The Russians began replacing smooth-bore guns with rifles, but it is not clear that this was important. If the Russians added additional troops after the Crimean War, Baddeley does not mention it. The new Czar, Viceroy and chief-of-staff – Alexander I, Baryatinsky and Milyutin – may have mattered. Gammer suggests that the Crimean War was important. The murids could always hope that someday the Turks might intervene if they held out long enough. When the Turks did nothing this hope was gone. The murids then had to rely on their own resources, which never had been enough.

== See also ==
- Sheikh Mansur
- Dagestan uprising (1920)
