= Biləcik =

Biləcik or Biledzhik or Baledzhik or Bilyadzhik may refer to:

- Birinci Biləcik, Azerbaijan
- İkinci Biləcik, Azerbaijan

== See also ==
- Bilecik, a city in Turkey
