= Battle of Gordali (1852) =

Battle between Chechen and Caucasian Army during the Murid War

- Part of the Murid War
Date	11 August 1852
Location	Gordali, Chechnya
Result	North Caucasian victory

Belligerents
Caucasian Imamate	Russian Empire

Commanders and leaders
Eski of Michik; Talkhig of Shali	(Russian Empire) Yakov Baklanov (Russian Empire) Leonty Nikolay

Strength
2,000	2,500

Casualties and losses
Unknown	701 (11 officers killed)

The Battle of Gordali was one of the fiercest battles of the Murid War, and by extension, the Caucasian War. The battle between the Separate Caucasian Corps of the Caucasian Army under the command of Colonel Baklanov and the Chechen troops under the leadership of Naibs Eski and Talkhig took place on August 11, 1852, near the village of Gurdali, located on the Michik River. The purpose of the campaign was to destroy the village of Gordali. The Russians managed to break into the village, but due to heavy losses Baklanov was forced to retreat.

== Background ==
In the summer of 1852, the future Caucasian governor, Prince Baryatinsky, commander of the left wing of the Caucasian line, began actions to exterminate the food and reserves of the Chechens. On July 7, the troops of the Russian Imperial Army under the command of Colonel Lyashchenko set out on a campaign to the village of Shali, where the detachment was engaged in the destruction of hay stocks.

Taking advantage of the fact that the Chechens were busy with strengthening the rear, Prince Baryatinsky at the beginning of the summer outlined a plan to increase the pressure on the Chechens of the Caucasian Imamate. He began military operations against the rebellious villages of Chechnya. The attacks were carried out from three directions: from the side of Shali and Bass to the Argun gorge and from the Kumyk plane. The Russian troops advancing from the side of the Kumyk Plain were to destroy the village of Gordali. The expeditionary detachment of Colonel Baklanov, having received the order of Prince Baryatinsky, gathered from different points of the Kumyk Plain in the Kura fortress three battalions of the Jaeger (Kabardian) regiment, one company of the line battalion, nine hundred from the Don regiments, two hundred of the Kizlyar Cossack regiment and seven guns. On August 11, the detachment set out from the Kura fortress (Oisangur) to the village of Gordali. The main goal "was to approach Gordali as quickly as possible, quickly attack this village and prevent the enemy from hiding".

== The course of the battle ==
At dawn on August 11, the cavalry surrounded Gordali. With the arrival of infantry and artillery, the assault on the village began.

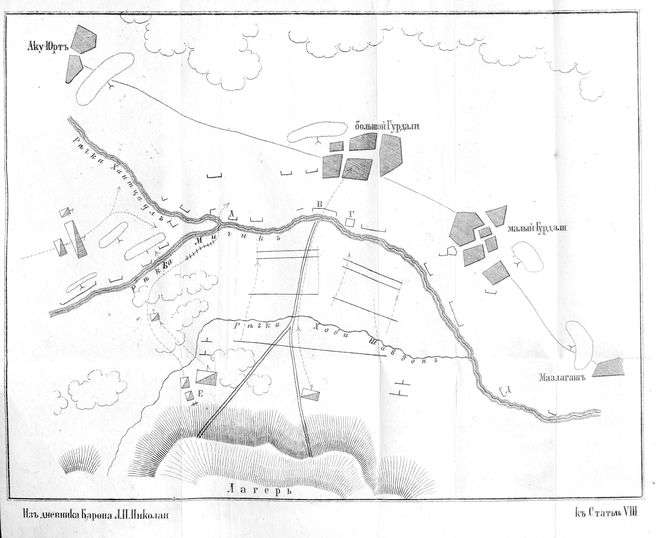
Map of Gordali 1853.

Gordali was rebuilt in the early 1850s by the order of Shamil as a village-fortress, as opposed to the fortification of the Impregnable Stan (Isti-su). The houses were built in such a way that each of them looked "something like a blockhouse" and getting into it, even through the doors, was not easy: they were thick-walled, with double bolts. Gordali was inhabited mainly by Shamil's murids. As a result, the Russian troops met stubborn resistance here. Infantry and cavalrymen did not manage to penetrate the houses, they only "let their grenades into small cracks in the houses at random".

After several hours of battle, it became obvious for Baklanov that it was not possible to take Gordali on his own, besides, Baklanov's detachment suffered huge losses. It was decided to retreat. The main part of the troops moving from the Gordali-aul to the Kura fortification had to pass through a forest clearing, where they were met by Shamil's murids, and from the other side were attacked by the Gordalians. The rearguard of the troops under the command of Baron Nikolay was in the same difficult situation as the vanguard.

As soon as the dark thickets hid our column in the thicket, from all directions, and mainly in the left chain and in the tail of the column, loud fire rumbled, which the Kabardians (Kabardinsky 80th Infantry Regiment) had not met for a long time. In one minute, a dozen people fell here and there, it took several dozen others to collect and drag them away. The forest resounded with the fierce exclamations of the mountaineers, our "hurray" ... - and groaned, as if upset by the appearance of intruders and a battle that had begun in it. ... As the detachment deepened all forward, slowly, quietly, striding with every movement, the highlanders followed on their heels, at a short distance, hid behind the rubble, behind large trees, freely pulled out large victims from the ranks ... In the third chasseur company, former in this chain, only three people were out of order: sergeant major, cadet and bugler; the rest died, the wounded walked under other people's guns and stretchers. Most of the officers were killed or wounded. The soldiers found themselves without leadership ... In the end, it got to the point that there was no one, and it was impossible to take the dead and wounded - these unfortunates were left in place.

— Volkanovsky

Seeing that the further movement of the column would lead to its death, Baron Nikolay, who was in charge of the Kabardin regiment, decided to stop, gather the remnants of the troops in one place and defend himself until help arrived. The detachment was saved from complete defeat by Baklanov who came to the rescue.
