= Attack on Dzherakh (1843) =

- Part of Caucasian War
| Date | 1843 |
| Location | Dzherakh, Tabasaran, Dagestan Oblast, Russian Empire |
| Result | Caucasian Imamate victory |
| Territorial changes | imamate forces capture and burn the village |

Belligerents
| Caucasian Imamate | Mountain Jews |

Commanders and leaders
| Hadji Murad; Abdalla‑bek | Local Jewish elders |

Strength
| ~200-500 (Two detachments) | unknown |

Casualties and losses
| Unknown | Unknown number killed; many taken captive; village largely destroyed |
- Only the synagogue survived the destruction

The attack on Dzherakh in 1843 was a military operation conducted by forces of the Caucasian Imamate under Imam Shamil against the Mountain Jewish village of Dzherakh (Judeo-Tat: Джерэхь) in the Tabasaran region of Dagestan, then part of the Russian Empire. The assault formed part of the Caucasian War (1817–1864) and resulted in the burning of the village, the massacre of a portion of the inhabitants, and the taking of hostages.

== Background ==
Dzherakh was a major Mountain Jewish settlement in Tabasaran, situated at about 500 metres above sea level. During the 18th and 19th centuries it was one of the largest centres of Mountain Jewish life in the North Caucasus, with approximately 100 Jewish families living there at its peak. The village also housed the residence of the Tabasaran Khan.

Throughout the Caucasian War, the Russian Empire and the Caucasian Imamate fought for control of the region. Mountain Jews, as a non-Muslim minority, were often caught between the two sides. While some Jews served in Shamil's administration, many others suffered persecution and violence at the hands of his forces, especially those who refused to convert to Islam or were suspected of collaborating with the Russians.

== The attack ==
In 1843, Dzherakh was attacked by a detachment under the command of Hadji Murad, a prominent Chechen commander serving Imam Shamil. Many of the Jewish residents managed to flee the village before the main assault, but their houses were largely set on fire and destroyed. According to the Russian Jewish Encyclopedia, Hadji Murad "burned the village".

A second detachment, led by Abdalla‑bek, then carried out a massacre in the Jewish quarter of Dzherakh, killing a number of residents and driving many others into captivity. Some accounts mention that the attackers also seized property and took captives for ransom. The operation was part of Shamil's broader campaign to subjugate non-Muslim communities and compel them either to convert to Islam or to pay tribute.

== Aftermath ==
After the attack, the surviving Jews who had taken refuge in the neighbouring village of Arak returned to Dzherakh. They found that only the synagogue had escaped destruction. According to the 1869 account of the ethnographer Iuda Cherny, the Jewish population of Dzherakh had dwindled to 20 "smokes" (households). This figure is corroborated by the official "Collection of Information about the Caucasian Highlanders", published by the Caucasian Mountain Administration in Tiflis. By 1886 the community had partially recovered to 49 households (137 men and 139 women). However, the community continued to face harassment from local officials, who arrested the shochet (ritual slaughterer), encouraged Muslims to graze livestock on Jewish lands, and incited anti‑Jewish incidents during the 1860s and 1870s.

In 1918, a Jewish self‑defence unit was formed in Dzherakh. After the Russian Civil War, the Jews did not return to the village, and the settlement eventually ceased to exist. A Jewish cemetery with tombstones dating back to 1798 remains at the site today.

== Significance ==
The attack on Dzherakh exemplifies the position of Mountain Jews during the Caucasian War. Unlike many other religious minorities, the Jews of the North Caucasus were neither fully protected by the Russian authorities nor spared by the forces of the Imamate. The event is documented in several historical sources, including Russian, Jewish, and Dagestani chronicles, and remains a notable episode in the history of the Mountain Jews.

== See also ==
- Mountain Jews
- Caucasian War
- Imam Shamil
- Hadji Murad
