= Nikolay Yevdokimov =

Russian general

Count Nikolay Yevdokimov
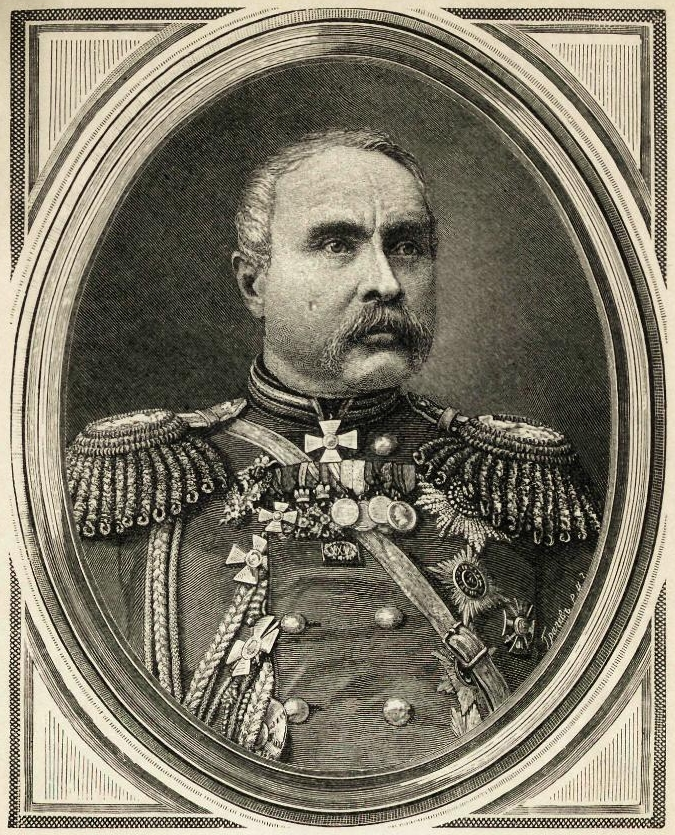
- Born: 1804; Naurskaya, Caucasus Governorate, Russian Empire
- Died: 3 June [O.S. 22 May] 1873; Pyatigorsk, Terek Oblast, Russian Empire
- Military career
- Allegiance: Russia
- Service years: 1821–1865
- Rank: General of the infantry
- Nickname: "Uch-gyoz"
- Conflicts: Russo-Persian War (1826–1828); Russo-Circassian War; Caucasian War

Count Nikolai Ivanovich Yevdokimov (1804 – 3 June [O.S. 22 May] 1873) was a Russian infantry general who took part in the Caucasian War on both the western and eastern fronts. He played a major role in the Circassian genocide.

== Early life and career ==
Yevdokimov was born in 1804 in the stanitsa (Cossack settlement) of Naurskaya (in modern-day Chechnya) in the Georgiyevsky Uyezd of the Caucasus Governorate. His father was of peasant origin and served in the army as an ordnance technician and achieved the rank of second lieutenant (podporuchik). Yevdokimov's father is said to have been from the Ufa, Ryazan or Perm governorates. He moved to the Caucasus for military service. Yevdokimov's mother, Darya Savelyeva, was a Cossack. He had two younger brothers who also became soldiers. He spent most of his childhood in the fortified settlement Temnolessky, where his father was serving as chief of artillery. Yevdokimov did not receive an education outside of the home. He entered military service in 1821 and until 1834 served in the Tenginsky and Kurinsky (from 1824) infantry regiments of the Separate Caucasian Corps. He participated in the suppression of the mountaineers in the khanates of Shaki and Quba and in the Russo-Persian War of 1826–1828. In 1831, he fought with distinction in a battle against the forces of the Dagestani imam Ghazi Muhammad near the settlement of Tarki. During the battle, he was wounded by a bullet that passed through his head, for which he received the nickname Uch-gyoz, which means 'three-eyed' in Turkic. In 1834, he was assigned to the Absheron Infantry Regiment. He fought at the battles of Gimry, where Ghazi Muhammad was killed, and Gotsatl. In December 1836, he became the adjutant of the 1st Brigade of the 19th Infantry Division commanded by General Klüge von Klugenau. In 1838, he became Klüge von Klugenau's adjutant.

== Battles against Shamil ==
In 1837, Yevdokimov participated in the negotiations between the Russian commanders and the Dagestani imam Shamil. In 1841, he was made the police chief (pristav) of the Koysubu group of villages. In 1842, he captured the village of Untsukul along with 80 of Shamil's warriors. In 1842, he took part in General Pavel Grabbe's Ichkeria expedition (to Chechnya). The next year, he participated in Klüge von Klugenau's Avaria expedition. He became the commander of the Volga Cossack Regiment in 1844 and of the Dagestan Infantry Regiment in 1846. He led the Dagestan Regiment in the successful battle against Shamil's forces near the village of Kutishi, where the Russian forces were commanded by General Vasily Bebutov. He was appointed commander of the 1st Brigade of the 20th Infantry Division in 1849 and of the 2nd Brigade of the 19th Infantry Division in 1850. He simultaneously served as head of the right (i.e., western) flank of the Caucasus Line system of fortifications. In 1851, he defeated Shamil's deputy in the Northwest Caucasus, Muhammad Amin, and moved the line of fortifications up to the Belaya River. In 1855, he became the commander of the 20th Infantry Division and head of the left flank (left wing after 1856) of the Caucasus Line. He was one of the planners and the main executor of the operation to inflict a decisive defeat upon Shamil's forces. His troops occupied the entire territory of Chechnya and captured Shamil's residence there, Vedeno. He then participated in the final assault on Ghunib, where Shamil surrendered and was taken prisoner.

== Circassian war, genocide and retirement ==
In 1859, Yevdokimov was promoted to adjutant general and received the title of count (graf). From 1860 to 1864, he was the head of the Kuban Oblast and commander of its troops. In 1864, he received the rank of general of the infantry. After the appointment of Grand Duke Michael Nikolaevich as commander-in-chief in the Caucasus, Yevdokimov was the de facto commander of Russian forces in the last stages of the war in the Western Caucasus. Yevdokimov put forward the plan to remove the Circassians from their highland homeland and force them either to settle in the mainly uninhabitable swamps in the lowlands or emigrate to Turkey. From 1861 to 1864, Yevdokimov was given responsibility for carrying out the deportations. Yevdokimov’s troops, after carrying out massacres in Circassian villages, forced the remaining Circassians to flee to the coast to be shipped to Turkey. There many thousands perished from disease, lack of food and exposure. The number of Circassians who died during Yevdokimov’s deportation operations is not known with certainty but modern scholarly estimates vary between 625,000 and 1,500,000. There is clear evidence that Yevdokimov was aware of the level of fatalities caused by the deportations but continued anyway; according to historian Walter Richmond, "At the very least Yevdokimov and the military personnel involved in the deportation could be considered guilty of genocide as defined under Point (c) of the United Nations Convention." In 1865, he was appointed to a position under the viceroy of the Caucasus and effectively retired. He received 7,800 dessiatines (8521.5 hectares) of land in the Kuban Oblast as a reward for his service. He died in Pyatigorsk 3 June [O.S. 22 May] 1873.
