= Battle of Khunzakh =

1830 battle during the Caucasian War

- Part of the Caucasian War
Date	February 1830
Location	Khunzakh, Dagestan
Result	Avar Khanate victory

Belligerents
Avar Khanate	Caucasian Imamate

Commanders and leaders
Pakhu-Bike; Hadji Murad	Ghazi Muhammad; Imam Shamil

Strength
About 1,000	3,000+

Casualties and losses
Unknown	200 killed, 60 captured

The Battle of Khunzakh in 1830 was Kazi Mulla’s failed attempt to capture the Avar Khanate based at Khunzakh during the Caucasian War.

In late 1829 Kazi Mulla began to preach holy war against Russia and declared himself Imam. His attempt to create a religiously-based Imamate naturally clashed with the political Khanate of Avaria. Further, the Khanate was under Russian pressure and received Russian subsidies. Kazi Mulla was based at Gimry 25 kilometers northeast of Khunzakh. On 4 February 1830 (all dates old style, so add 12 days for the modern calendar) Kazi Mulla gathered some 3000 men and marched on Andi, 50 kilometers west of Gimry. He gained their reluctant support and marched to Khunzakh 45 kilometers southeast, arriving on the 14th. Khunzakh at this time had over 700 houses, walls and defensive towers and was ruled by Pakhu-Bike, the widow of the late Khan. Kazi Mulla advanced, leading one column and Shamil the other. Impressed by the large force, the defenders began to give way. Pakhu-Bike, it is said, suddenly appeared before them and said “Avars, you are not worthy to bear arms. If you are afraid, give your swords to us women and take refuge behind our robes.” Stung by this taunt the defenders rallied and drove off the Murids, killing 200, wounding many and leaving 60 prisoners in the hands of the Khansha. Hadji Murad gathered up the banners of the enemy and sent them to Tiflis as proof of Avaria's loyalty to Russia. Kazi Mulla withdrew and soon made a new base in the forests of Chumkeskent 20 km east of Gimry.

Kazi Mulla was killed in battle two years later and was followed by Hamzat Bek. In 1834 Hamzat captured Khunzakh, beheaded Pakhu-Bike and killed most of the royal family. A month later he was killed by Hadji Murad in revenge for the slaughter of the royal family.
