= Birinci Biləcik =

- Municipality
- Location within Azerbaijan Location within Shaki-Zagatala Economic Region
- Coordinates: 41°19′35″N 46°56′56″E
- Country: Azerbaijan
- Rayon: Shaki
- Established: 1570
- Elevation: 326 m (1,070 ft)

Population
  - Total: 1,399
- Time zone: UTC+4 (AZT)
  - Summer (DST): UTC+5 (AZT)
- Area code: AZ5534

Birinci Biləcik (also, Biledzhik Pervoye, Biledzhik Pervyy, Birindzhi-Baledzhik, and Birindzhi-Bilyadzhik) is a village and municipality in the Shaki Rayon of Azerbaijan. It lies in the Alazan-Ayrichay basin and has a population of 1,399.

== Name ==
During the collectivisation era of the USSR, the village of Bilejik received its prefix Birinci which means 'first', i.e. original. This helps contrast the village (i.e. historical Biləcik) with much newer İkinci Biləcik, founded nearby in the Soviet times.

== History ==
Local historians cite the foundation of Bilejik (Biləcik) village to around 1570, originally by families who had come here from what is now the Bilecik Province district of Turkey. In 1734, Bilejik was the centre of a major revolt against Nadir Shah but after minor gains, the rebellion caused Bilejik to become the focus for Nadir Shah's ire with a counter attack force sent from Barda to take revenge on the rebels. In fear of terrible reprisals, some 300 families left Bilejik and retreated to the autonomous communities of Jar-Balakan according to Mullah Mohammad Jari's Chronicle of the Tsar's War. This is historically plausible as the Djaris from Djaro-Belokani had already fought Nadir Shah's army in 1738 (near Dzhinikh/Lekit), killing Nadir's brother Ibraham-Khan during that earlier conflict.

In 1852, according to Tolstoy in his posthumous novella, it was in a copse close to Bilejik (Bilardzhik) where Hadji Murad and his murids made their last stand, their horses having become bogged down in a waterlogged ricefield while trying to flee from the Cossacks of Nukha.
