= Battle of Gimry =

1832 battle in Gimry, Dagestan

- Part of the Murid War
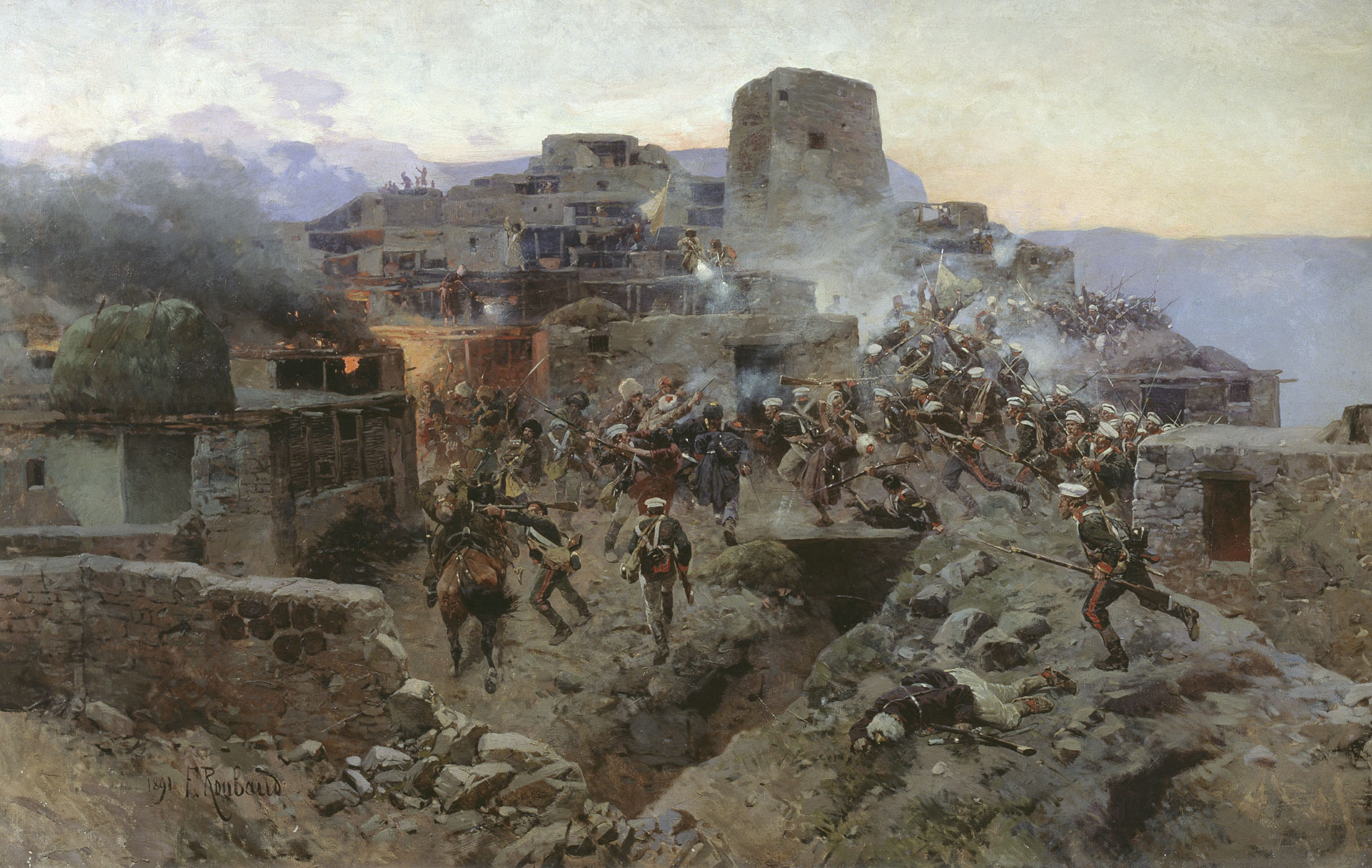
- The Storming of Gimry, an 1891 painting by Franz Roubaud
Date	17–18 October 1832
Location	Gimry, Dagestan, Caucasian Imamate
Result	Russian victory

Belligerents
Russian Empire	Caucasian Imamate

Commanders and leaders
(Russian Empire) Aleksey Velyaminov	Ghazi Muhammad †; Imam Shamil (WIA)

Strength
10,000	600–3,000

Casualties and losses
41 killed 339 wounded	176 killed

The Battle of Gimry, fought on 17–18 October 1832 during the Murid War, was General Aleksey Velyaminov's capture of Ghazi Muhammad's headquarters at Gimry. Ghazi Muhammad was killed, but Imam Shamil managed to escape.

In early October, Velyaminov left Temir-Khan-Shura (Buynaksk) 25 km to the east. The route led through early snow across a broad and level plateau which slowly rises from 1,500 feet to 6,000 feet and then suddenly drops 5,000 feet down into the canyon of the north-flowing Avar Koysu. In many places the canyon walls are almost vertical. Gimry is on the east side of the river at the mouth of a side canyon which extends about 7 km southeast. There were two paths down into the canyon, neither of which was fit for an army. Velyaminov chose the eastern one leading to the head of the side canyon where the drop is about 3,000 feet. (Today there is a long automobile tunnel from the plateau to the head of the side canyon.) Taking advantage of the morning mist, Velyaminov got his advance guard down to the side canyon, in places using ropes and ladders, and spent several days cutting an approximation of a road. This took from the 10th to the 13th, on the 14th Baron Rosen came up with more soldiers and by the 17th most of the force was concentrated at the upper side canyon.

== Battle ==
Ghazi Muhammad had built three walls across the side canyon about four kilometers southeast of Gimry. Near the outer wall were two stone houses, to which the Russians paid little attention. Today these are marked by a modern reconstruction called Shamil’s Tower. Velyaminov’s plan was to take the left end of the first wall and then make a frontal attack while the wall was enfiladed. This failed because the officer turned too soon and made a frontal attack with great loss. At this point Hamzat Bek appeared from the south and threatened to cut off the head of the Russian force. Klugenau appeared at the right moment and Hamzat Bek withdrew, leaving Ghazi Muhammad to his fate. Seeing that the first attack had failed due to a mistake, Velyaminov tried the same tactic again. This time it worked. When the first wall was taken the Russians pursued so quickly that the enemy had no time to re-form on the second or third walls. By this time it was dark and the Russians camped where they stood.

Meanwhile, attention turned to the two houses. They were occupied by some sixty murids who had either resolved to die there or were cut off when the first wall fell. Two companies of sappers and several mountain guns were sent to clear the houses. After a few rounds the houses were assaulted and all the defenders were killed, only two escaping. That night some natives were called to identify the dead. One body was that of Ghazi Muhammad. He was said to be lying in the Muslim attitude of prayer. One of the two men who escaped was Shamil. There are different versions of the story, but according to Baddeley, Shamil suddenly appeared above a raised doorway. When the soldiers raised their guns to shoot he leaped over them, landed behind their backs, cut down three of them with his sword but was bayonetted in the lung by a forth. He grasped the weapon with one hand, killed its owner with the other, pulled out the bayonet and disappeared into the forest.

Apsheron memo Nikolay Samokish

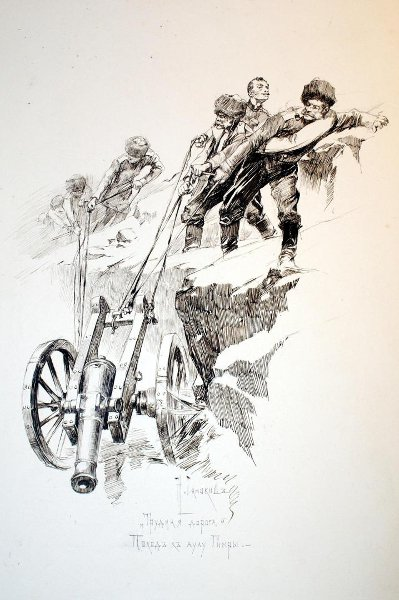
Expedition to the village Gimry

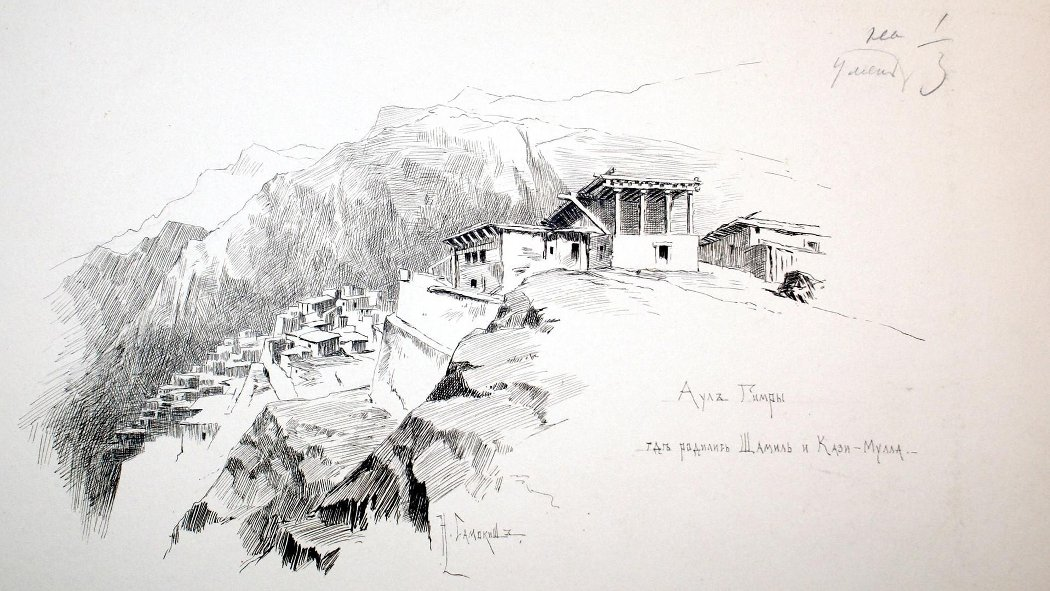
View of the mountain village Gimry

== Aftermath ==
The next day, October 18, Klugenau entered Gimry without resistance. The village elders sued for peace. A week later the army returned to Temir-Khan-Shura. The Russian losses were given as 1 officer and 40 men killed, 19 officers and 320 men wounded and 18 officers and 53 men contused, for a total of 452. The Murids lost 176 dead with no wounded counted.
