= Ludwig Ernst von Nicolay =

Russian general (1820–1891)

Louis Ernst Freiherr von Nicolay (Russian: Леонтий Павлович Николаи; 7 January 1820 in Copenhagen, Denmark – 2 February 1891 in the Grande Chartreuse, France) was a Russian general during the Caucasian War. He converted to the Roman Catholicism taking a name Jean-Louis in the monastic life of the Carthusians.

== Life ==
Louis von Nicolay was a grandson of Baron Ludwig Heinrich von Nicolay, the first owner of the famous Monrepos estate. He was born on January 7, 1820, in Copenhagen, and was the son of Baron Paul von Nicolay, Russian extreme envoy to the court of Denmark, and his mother was Alexandrina Simplicius de Broglie (the granddaughter of Victor François de Broglie). His brother, Alexander, was also a well-known figure in the Caucasus and left a memoir.

Nicolay in 1833 entered in the Sea Cadet Corps (Russia) and at the end of the course which was in December 1837 he was a warrant officer in the Baltic Fleet, and as one of the most academically talented students and the body was left for improvement in the military marine sciences in the officer class at the Naval College, later transformed into the Nicholas Naval Academy. In 1841, with the rank of lieutenant, Nicolay was transferred to the Black Sea Fleet, which found a patron in the person of Admiral Mikhail Lazarev. In 1842, Nicolay was in international voyages in the Mediterranean Sea in the crew of the corvette "Andromache", and in 1844, leaving the naval service, joined the military land designation in Dragoon Grand Duke Mikhail Pavlovich regiment with the rank of lieutenant, but soon entered in the General Staff Academy (Imperial Russia), where he graduated from the course in 1846.

Since 1847 began active service on Baron Nicolay in the Caucasus, which lasted for twenty years, with a short break. This break occurred in 1849 as a result of the Hungarian Revolution of 1848, when Nicolay was appointed to consist in the main headquarters of Field Marshal Ivan Paskevich, and then to the rank of adjutant was from 1849 to 1850 in Vologda Governorate, where he was charged with monitoring the recruitments. In 1849, for bravery in battle with the Hungarians, Nicolay received a Gold Sword for Bravery. Returning to the Caucasus, Nicolay was appointed first in the winter expedition against the Highlanders, then transferred to the Kabardian Regiment, which has since been inextricably linked its activities. Nicolay was appointed commander of the 3rd Battalion and was given to him the command of the regiment's and remained in that position until December 1857. During the seven-year period (1850–1857) Nicolai, most of the time was in the marches. Particularly difficult was his position during the Crimean War, when because of the diversion of troops in Asia Minor was to be expected from Shamil particularly decisive action. On 26 December 1853 Nicolay was awarded the Order of St. George 4th degree. In recompense of these great feats of courage and bravery, rendered in 1853 in the cases against the Highlanders, and especially for the difference extended to the 17th of February in the assault and capture of the enemy's position on heavily fortified river Mechik on 3 October 1854 Baron Nicolay, with 6 companies of managed to break under the His-sous many thousands of Imam Shamil, who tried to invade the Kumyk plane on 6 December of the same year made a major general in the suite with the appointment of His Majesty. From 1857 to 1860 Nicolai was the commander in chief of the Caucasian Army and took part in the famous campaign of 1859, which ended in the Shamil's capture.

On January 28, 1860, Nicolay was promoted to lieutenant general with the appointment of the head of the Caucasian Grenadier Division, and in 1862 he was appointed adjutant-general, and was awarded a gold sword decorated with diamonds with the inscription "For Bravery". In the rank of chief of the Caucasian Grenadier Division of Baron Nicolay remained until 1867, when he left on vacation abroad. The following year he retired.

=== Religion ===
Nicolay was extremely religious, and this feeling is particularly developed in it for the full-time of the dangers of service in the Caucasus. The result of this religious sentiment was the transition of Baron Nicolay in 1868 from Protestantism to Catholicism, and then, in retirement, to the tonsure. In 1868 Baron Nicolay became a monk of the Order of Carthusians by the name of Jean-Louis, shorn in the monastery of the Grande Chartreuse, near Grenoble in France, where he died on January 21 ( February 2 new style) 1891.

== Diary ==
Baron Nicolay's diary from the period of the Hungarian campaign (1849) was printed in his lifetime in the Russkaya Starina in 1877 (Vol. XX, Vol. 9, 10 and 11).

== Sources ==
- Military Encyclopedia / Ed. VF Nowicki et al. - St. Petersburg. : t of Sytina IV, 1911-1915. - T. 16.
- Olszewski M. Ya Caucasus from 1841 to 1866. St. Petersburg., 2003.
- Russian Biographical Dictionary: In the 25 t / under the supervision of Alexander Polovtsov. 1896-1918.
