= İkinci Biləcik =

- Municipality
- Location within Azerbaijan Location within Shaki-Zagatala Economic Region
- Coordinates: 41°19′23″N 46°57′04″E
- Country: Azerbaijan
- Rayon: Shaki

Population
  - Total: 1,141
- Time zone: UTC+4 (AZT)
  - Summer (DST): UTC+5 (AZT)

İkinci Biləcik (also, Biledzhik, Biledzhik Vtoroy, Biledzhik Vtoroye, and Bilyadzhik) is a village and municipality in the Shaki Rayon of Azerbaijan. It has a population of 1,141.
