= Hadji Murad =

North Caucasian independence leader (1818–1852)

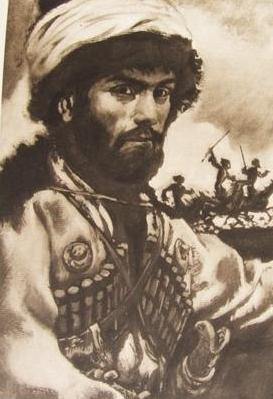
- Depiction by Eugene Lanceray
- Born: 1818; Khunzakh, Dagestan, North Caucasus
- Died: 5 May 1852 (aged 33–34); Ondzhally, Russian Empire (now Qakh District, Azerbaijan)
- Known for: Resistance leader against the Russian Empire

Hadji Murad (Russian: Хаджи-Мурат, Avar: XӀажи Мурад; 1818 – 5 May [O.S. 23 April] 1852) was an important North Caucasian Avar leader during the resistance of the peoples of Dagestan and Chechnya in 1811–1864 against the incorporation of the region into the Russian Empire.

== Life ==
=== Youth ===
Hadji Murad was an Avar commander who lived in the North Caucasus. He was foster-brother to Omar, son of Pakkou-Bekkhe, the Khanum of Khunzakh. According to the legend relayed by Leo Tolstoy, Murad's mother Patimat was originally to have been forced to give up her baby to become wet nurse for Omar. Her refusal nearly led to her murder but though stabbed in the breast she survived and indeed was finally able to wean her own son.

=== Alliance with Russia ===
Hadji Murad was involved in the murder of Hamzat Bek during a Friday prayer in 1834, in revenge for Gamzat's murdering of the Khanum of Khunzakh and her sons. Murad's brother, Osman, was slain in the fight with Hamzat Bek's Murids.

Hadji Murad supported the Russians in their imperial ambitions for a while, to counter what he saw as the threat of Muridism in the North Caucasus. His rival, Akhmet Khan, set about undermining Russian confidence in Murad, until they ordered his arrest, which was to be carried out by Akhmet Khan. Hadji Murad contrived to escape, by flinging himself over the ledge of a narrow mountain pass. The Russians gave him up for dead. The snow, however, had broken his fall and he lay in hiding for the winter. Because of the Russians' bad faith, he decided to throw his lot in with Imam Shamil, who bestowed upon him the rank of naib. Many tribes followed Hadji Murad, defecting from the Russians.

=== Exploits and service under Shamil ===
His exploits and red dress earned him the nickname of 'the red devil' from the Russians. After an ineffectual raid on Russian headquarters at Temirkhan-Shura, a rumour spread that he had slaughtered all the Russians in the hospital and cut them up into shashliks, which he left behind for the Russian troops to eat unawares. Though false, this rumour gained much credence among the Russians and vilified Hadji Murad's reputation.

=== Defection to Russia ===
In 1851, a feud broke out between him and Imam Shamil, when Shamil proclaimed his son, Khazi Mohammed, as his successor. In a secret meeting, Shamil and his naibs decided that Hadji Murad should be killed. An unknown naib warned him and he managed to escape in time, but his family were held captive. Hadji Murad surrendered to the Russians, who lionised but mistrusted him. He repeatedly asked to be given men and guns to attack Shamil and rescue his family, but received no firm reply. He was allowed to move from Tbilisi to the small Muslim town of Noukkha (now Shaki, Azerbaijan) accompanied by a Cossack escort. Hadji Murad planned an escape, which he carried out on April 24 (Old style calendar), 1852, during one of his morning rides. The Cossack guards were ambushed and killed but the town's garrison, led by Colonel Karganov, tracked Hadji Murad down. The Russians were joined by many tribesmen, including Akhmet Khan's son, and Hadji Murad was killed in the ensuing fight. The young son of Akhmet Khan cut off the head and sent it to Tbilisi, where it was embalmed and then sent to the Emperor. Tolstoy places Murad's death near Belarjik (probably referring to the latterday town of Birinci Biləcik on the Shaki to Qakh road), but a commemorative grave marker is farther south near km76 on the Shaki-Zaqatala road.

Hadji Murad's severed head was finally sent to be kept at the Kunstkamera in St. Petersburg. In 2017, his descendants and activists in Dagestan petitioned to retrieve his skull from St. Petersburg and reunite it with the rest of his remains believed to be buried in modern Azerbaijan's Qakh District. The Russian government set up an interagency commission to consider the request.

=== In fiction ===
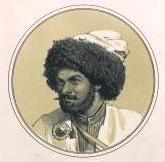
Hadji Murad

Leo Tolstoy's posthumously published novella Hadji Murad (1912) is a partially fictionalized account of Murad's struggle with the Russian Empire. His image also appears in My Dagestan, a novel of the Avar writer Rasul Gamzatov.

Agi Murad il diavolo bianco (1959) – in English, The White Warrior – is an Italian movie account of Murad's struggle with the Russian Empire. Murad is played by former 'Mr Universe', bodybuilder Steve Reeves.

=== Banners of Hadji Murad ===
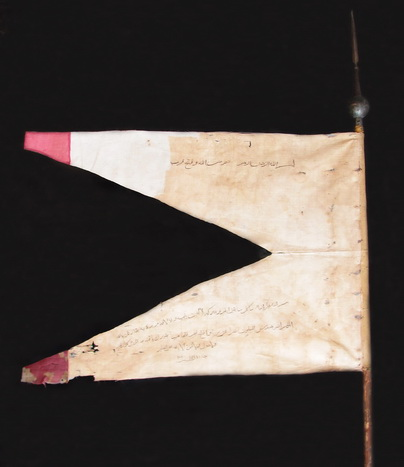
The banner of Hadji Murad, captured on July 1, 1844 by General Argutinsky-Dolgorukov's detachment.

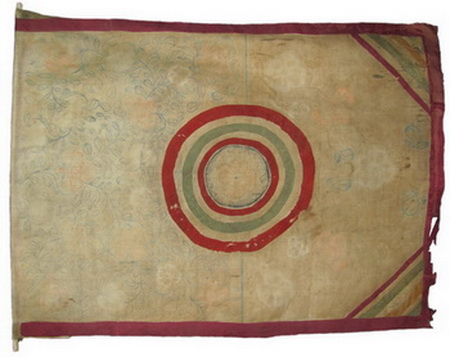
The banner of Naib Hadji Murad, captured on June 23, 1848, during the siege of Gergebil.
