= Murtazeki =

Military unit of the North Caucasian Imamate

Murtazeki (Guard)
- (Arabic: مرتزق)
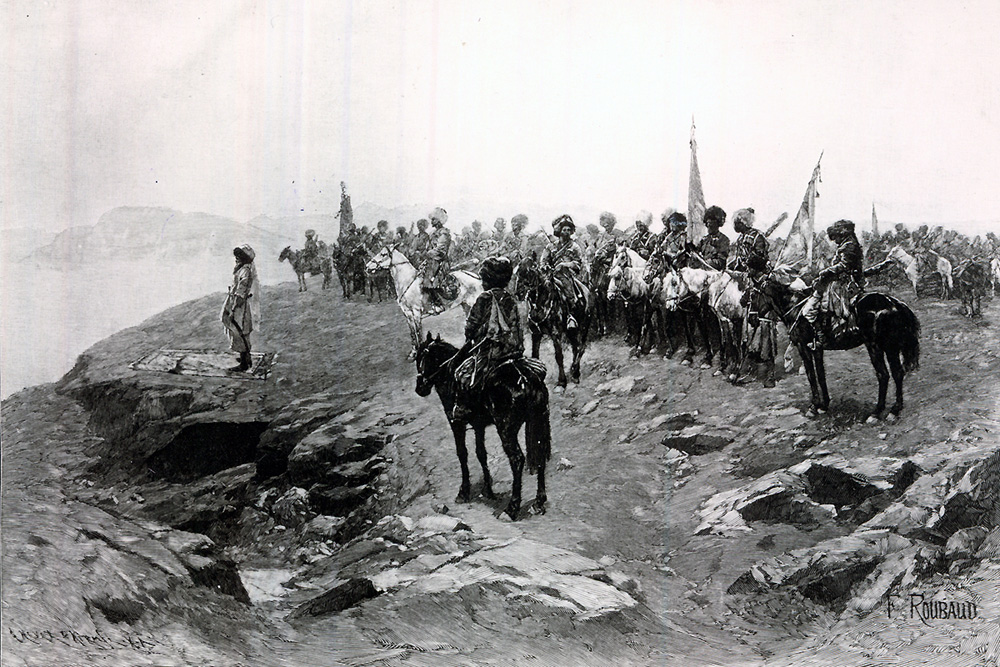
- Shamil's prayer before the fight. Murtazeks on horseback. Franz Roubaud
- Active: 1833–1859
- Country: North Caucasian Imamate; Circassia
- Allegiance: imam
- Branch: Army
- Type: Infantry; Cavalry
- Role: Border Troops, close protection
- Size: 1300 (1836), to 4000 (1843)
- Motto(s): "There is no God but Allah" (Arabic: لا اله الا الله)
- Colors
- Equipment: Shashka sabers daggers guns pistols
- Engagements: Battle of Gimry (1832); Battle of Argvani(1839); Siege of Akhoulgo (1839); Battle of the Valerik River (1840); Battle of Ichkeria (1842); Battle of Dargo (1845); Battle of Ghunib (1859)

Commanders
- known commanders: Imam Shamil; Shuaib-Mulla of Tsentara; Muhammad Amin Asiyalav; Akhberdil Muhammad; Sultan-Murad Benoevsky

Insignia
- Identification symbol: Guard

Murtazeki or Murtaziq (Arabic: مرتزق, lit. 'chosen, mercenary warrior') was a military formation of the North Caucasian Imamate and Circassia. They were professional paid soldiers who made up the guards of the state. Initially organized by Shamil as a combat unit, the border troops, in peacetime, performed the functions of the police, and were also the personal guards of the imam. They were subdivided into tens, hundreds and five hundred; each of these parts had its own chief.

== Etymology ==
Murtazeki (murtizikatun) — translated from Arabic «chosen, secured, hired warrior.» In addition to this form, there are variants of «murtazikyats, murtazigates, murtazigaters». Murtazek can be translated as a soldier getting his rations, as opposed to a militia fighter eating what he took from home. Murtazikat — plural of Murtazek.

== History ==
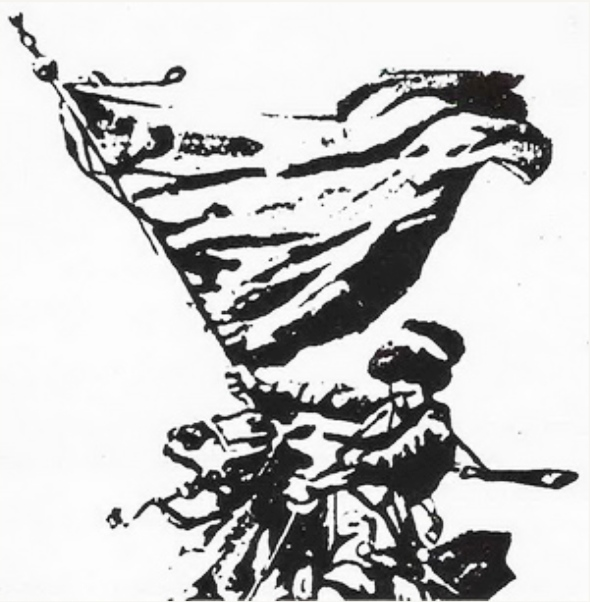
Illustration from the booklet for the opening of the panorama «Storm of Ahulgo» in Munich and Paris. by Franz Roubaud, (1890)

The emergence of a special guard of murtazeks before Shamil took office as imam in 1834 is evidenced by the testimony of Muhammad Tahir al-Qarahi, contained in his chronicles.

The exact date of the appearance of murtazeks is unknown. Already in 1833, the chronicler reports, a messenger came to Shamil from Hamzat with an order that he and the murtazeks of that district should oppose the village of Mushuli and break the disobedience of the inhabitants…

The fact that during the period of the Hamzat Bek imamate there were detachments of mercenary soldiers-murtazeks, and some of them were commanded by Shamil, is evidenced by the first mention of murtazeks. Detachments of murtazeks existed not only under the direct leadership of the imams themselves, but also under the leadership of individual naibs.

The purpose of creating murtazeks was to have units always ready for battle. With the exception of the team under Shamil, other murtazeks were sent to villages and communities, both to those from where they came from, and to those whose loyalty the imam doubted. Supervising the implementation of the rules of Shariaa, but constantly ready for action at the first request of Shamil, they carried a special, cordon or guard, service there on the border with the Russians, playing the role of customs service and Border Troops. Murtazeks were freed from household chores and were supported by their communities; they were chosen from every 10 yards (families), according to other sources, they were kept at the expense of those auls where they were sent. Every 10 households paid such a person 10 tumans a year. Thus, at any time (1836) Shamil had at his disposal about 1,500 people called murtazeks. If necessary, in addition to the murtazeks, special parties and detachments gathered.

In organizational terms, murtazeks were divided into tens, hundreds, and half a thousand, with a chief at the head. Murtazikats did not mix with the temporary militia, but always remained in separate units, under the command of their naibs. Shamil at the beginning of 1843 dressed the Murtazeks in a single uniform: yellow Circassian and green papakhas. The chiefs had black Circassian.

The collection of murtazeks took place either by order of Shamil himself or his naibs. In the first case, the murids were sent to the naibs with orders to collect a certain number of murtazeks and come with them to the appointed place by a certain time. In the second case, each naib collected a certain number of murtazeks, both for the defense of his naibdom and for a raid. For better control of the murtazeks during the battle, Shamil divided them by naibs into detachments of 500 and 100 people, ordering the naibs, five hundred and hundred chiefs to have distinctive badges.

According to the information provided by сolonel R. K. Freitag, the naib sometimes appoints one general chief to manage the murtazikats, under the name of a mazun, and sometimes several, choosing them not for courage, but for devotion to muridism, since they are also entrusted with the internal management of auls . According to Major General Kluka von Klugenau, the naib himself commands the murtazikats and elects only hundreds of commanders … The difference in these explanations may have come from the fact that the order of leadership shown by сolonel Freytag exists in Chechnya, and the latter in Dagestan

According to the military historian N. F. Dubrovina: To help the naibs, only in Chechnya alone was a special estate of murtazeks established. These were people who devoted themselves to the actual guard or cordon service and occupied guards along the entire border of non-peaceful Chechnya. In Dagestan, the estate of murtazeks did not exist at all.

The number of murtazeks, according to Russian intelligence, at the end of the winter of 1843, from the villages of Assa to Sugratal, was up to 4 thousand people; in Chechnya there were more than 1,000 of them. According to A.P. Berzhe, the army, composed of murtazeks, extended throughout Chechnya up to 3,000 people. In general, the Chechens had murtazeks and murids, but there their number was not as great as in the mountains. Naib could himself convene murtazeks both for defense and for a raid.

As N. F. Dubrovin writes (according to Major General D. V. Passek), it was easier to deal with a gathering of several thousand free militia, at least under the leadership of the bravest highlanders, than to attack several hundred murids surrounding the leader and the forces of their chosen position. The first, skillfully directed and decisive, attack put to flight crowds of free militia. On the contrary, if you had to deal with only murids, then each point had to be taken after a stubborn battle, the enemy’s fire was the most deadly. Then the highlanders did not shoot at the crowd, but always aimed, aiming several guns at each alley, at each corner, twist, path — from where our soldiers could appear.
