= Isa of Ghendargen =

Chechen general of the Caucasian Imamate (1795–1845)

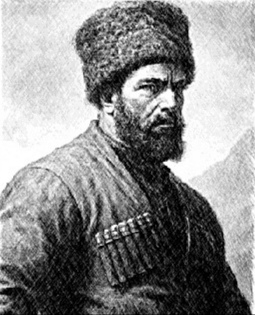
- Born: 1795; Ghendargen, Chechnya
- Died: 1845 (aged 49–50); Urus-Martan, Chechnya
- Military career
- Allegiance: Caucasian Imamate
- Branch: Army
- Service years: 1810–1845
- Rank: General
- Commands: Eastern and Central fronts
- Conflicts: Caucasian War; Battle of the Valerik River; Battle of Ichkeria; Battle of Gekhi; Battle of Dargo (1845)

Isa of Ghendargen (Chechen: Гендаргнойн Ӏийса, romanized: Ghendargnoyn Isa; 1795 – 1845) was a Chechen general during the Caucasian War, who commanded the Eastern and Central Fronts of the Caucasian Imamate. He is also one of the great commanders in Chechen history. Isa was of the Ghendargnoy teip and Appaz-Nek'e (branch of a teip).

== Early life ==
Isa was born in 1795 in the village of Ghendargen, in the east of Chechnya. His father Ela had great influence among the Chechens. When the boy was ten, the family moved to Urus-Martan. In his youth Isa stood out among his peers for his leadership and bravery.

== Caucasian war ==
=== Battle of the Valerik River ===
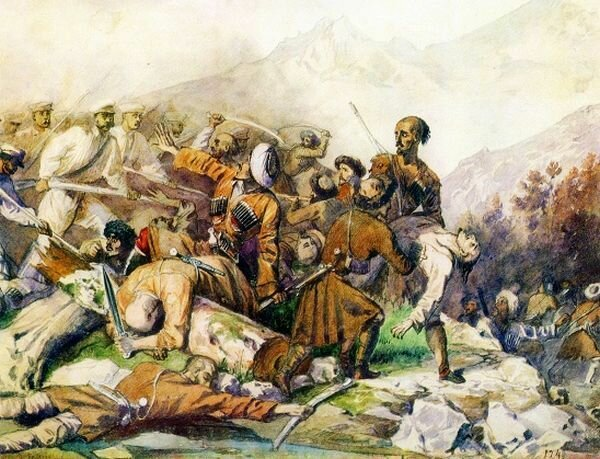
Battle of the River Valerik by Mikhail Lermontov

In May 1840, detachments of Isa and Akhberdil-Muhammad defeated Russian troops near the village of Achkhoy-Martan, and a month later attacked the Russian fortress of Nazran. General Galafeev's expedition into western Chechnya, commanded by 4,000 infantrymen and 1,500 Cossacks, was the answer. Isa and others ambushed the troops on the Valerik River. The battle took place on 11 July 1840. Both sides suffered significant losses.

=== Battle of Ichkeria ===
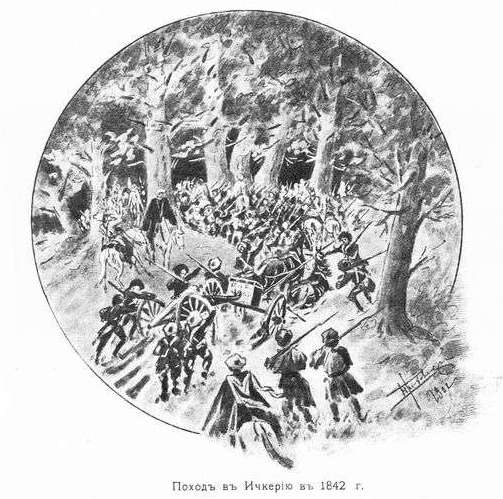
The Battle of Ichkeria, painting by Bryukhovetsky

In the summer of 1842 General Grabbe organised a military campaign in eastern Chechnya with the intention of capturing Dargo and defeating Shamil's residence. A ten-thousand-strong detachment of Russian troops got bogged down in the dense Chechen forests and was constantly attacked by Chechens. In this battle Isa and his detachment supported Shuaib-Mulla of Tsentara. The Chechens defeated Grabbe's expeditionary detachment. He lost about 1,800 soldiers and 66 officers in that battle.

=== Battle of Dargo (1845) ===
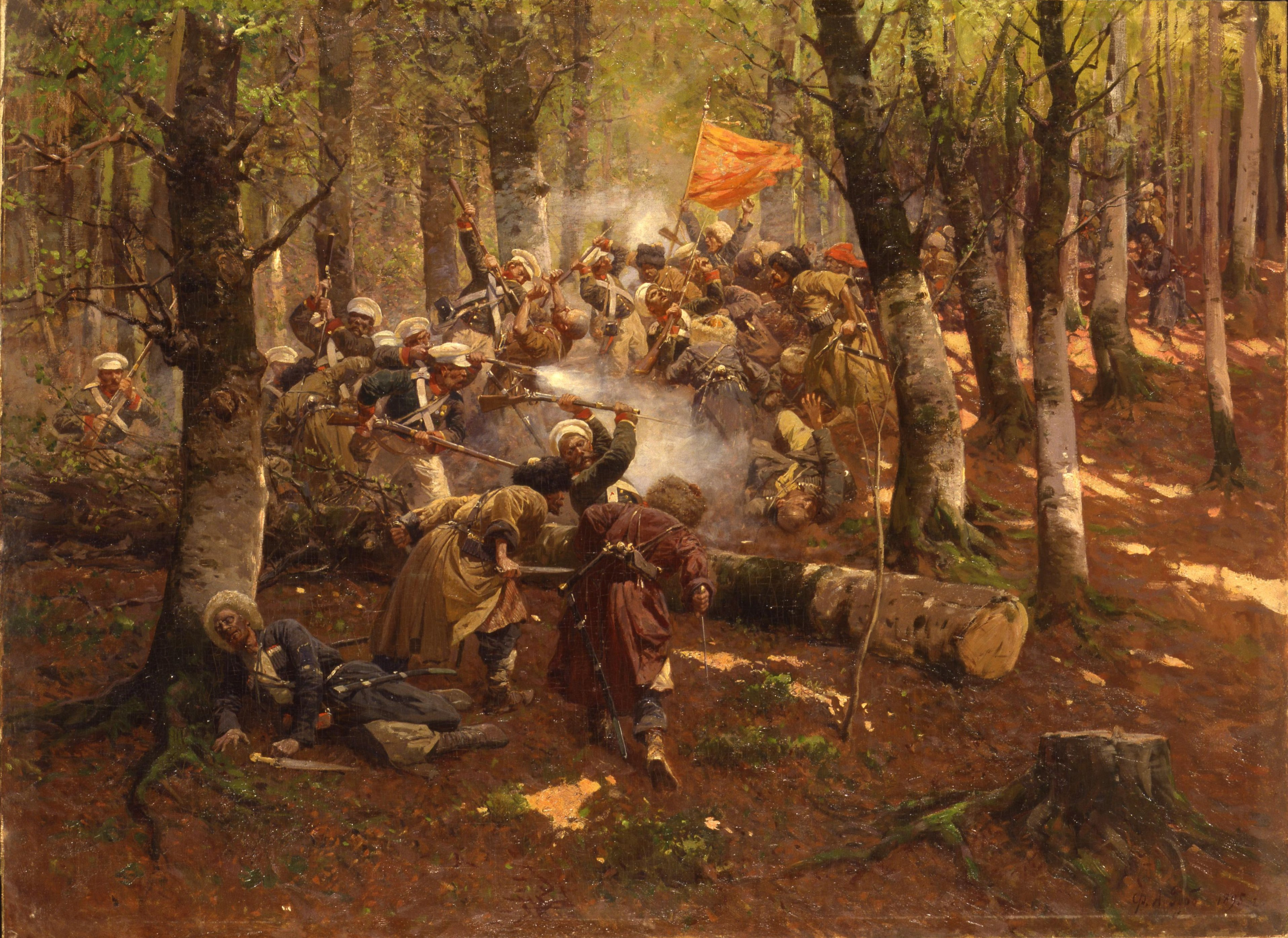
Battle of Dargo, painting by Franz Roubaud

In his last battle, Isa inflicted a major defeat on the Austrian general of the Russian service, Franz Klugenau, destroying 1,700 soldiers and officers near the village of Dargo.

== Death ==
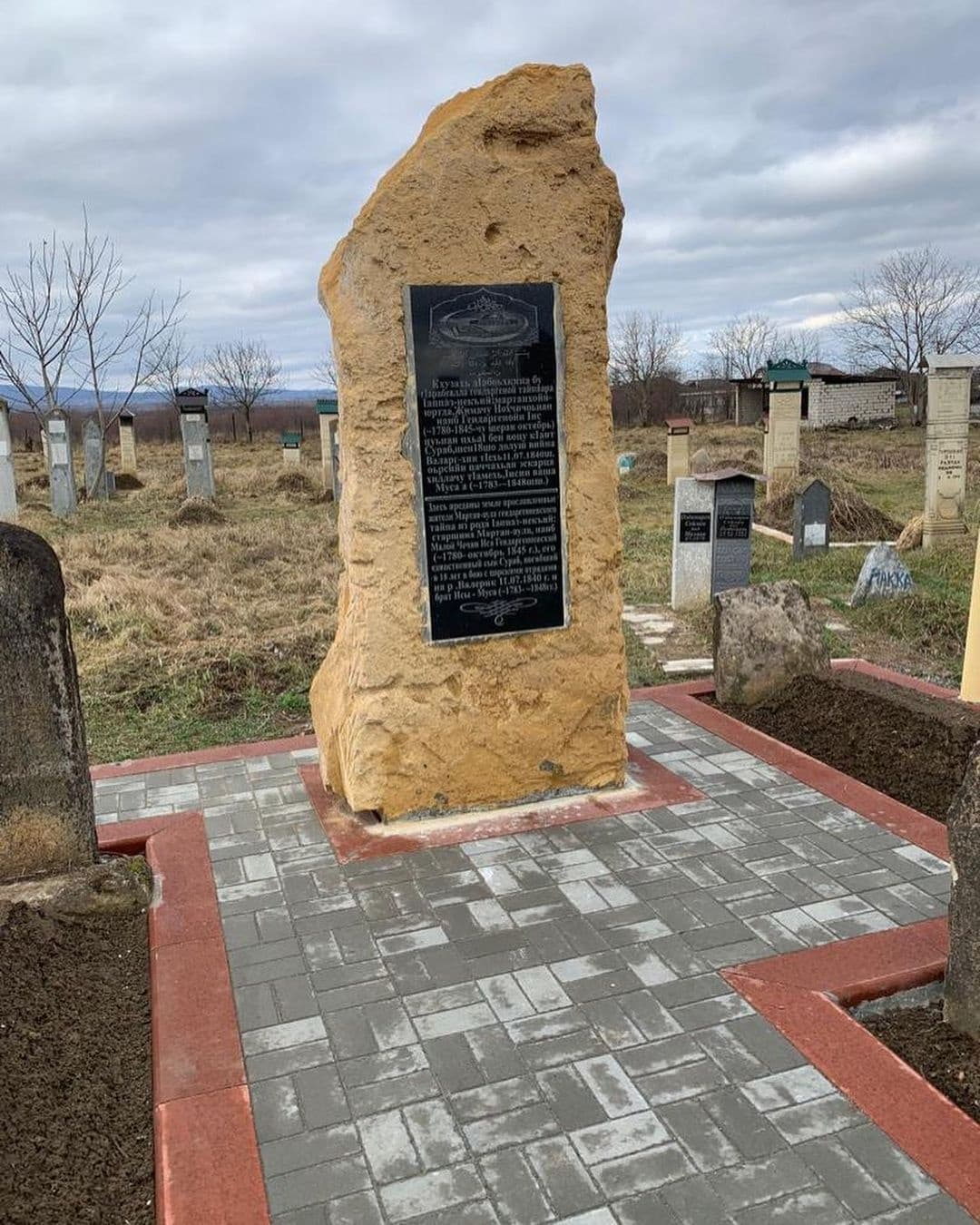
The tomb of Isa

Isa of Ghendargen died after a serious short illness in December 1845. It is said that his last words were:

I spent many years in the war for ghazawat, hoping that I would fall on the battlefield. I never thought I would have to die in bed. Yet I believe that my merits will count for me in the next world.
