= Battle of Dargo (1845) =

Military conflict in the Caucasus

Coordinates: 42.95°N 46.233°E

Dargo Campaign
- Part of the Murid War
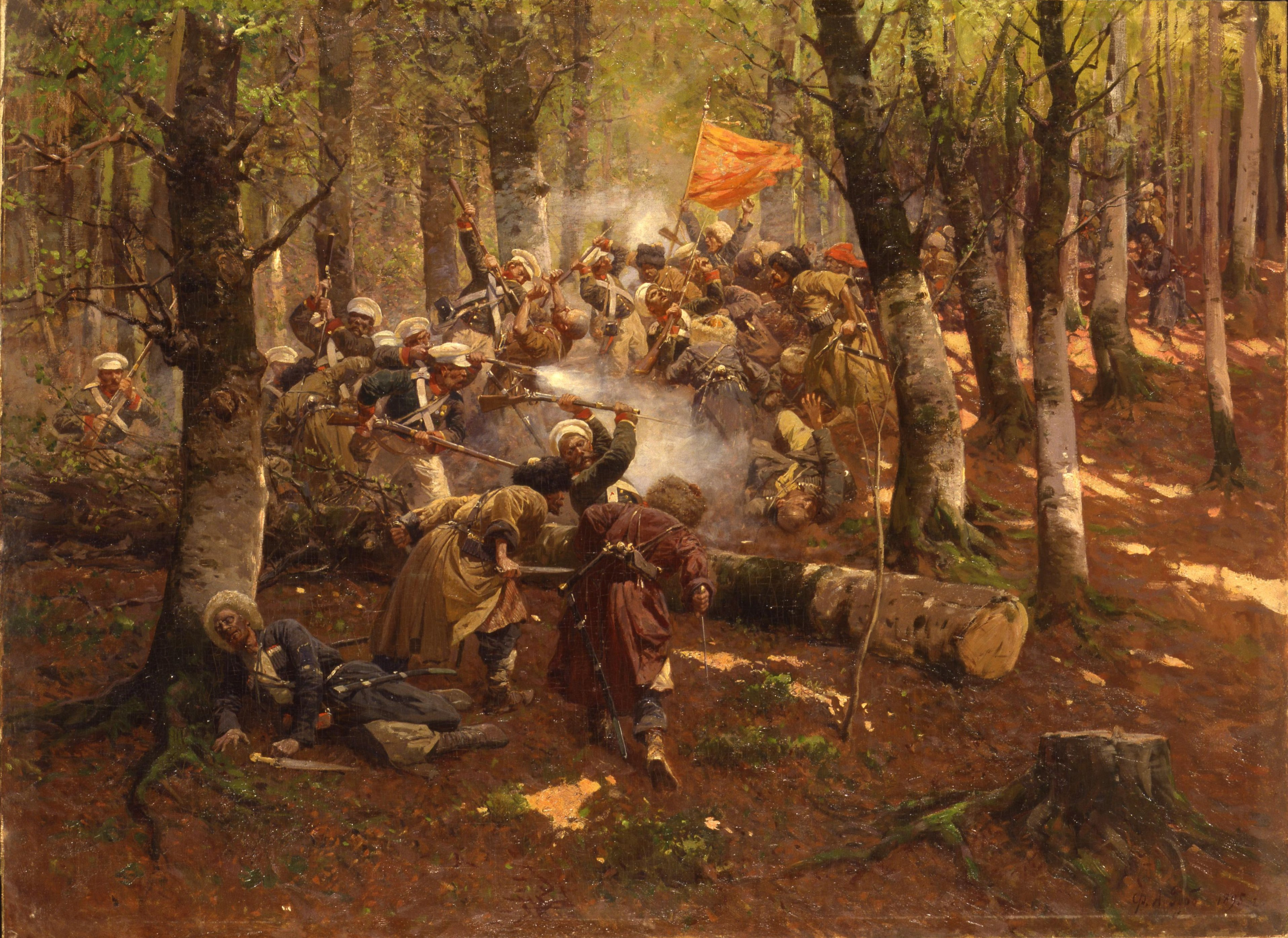
- Battle of Dargo, painting by Franz Roubaud
Date	31 May – 21 July 1845
Location	Dargo, Chechnya, North Caucasia
Result	North Caucasian victory Full results: The goal of campaign was to defeat Shamil's troops, take Dargo,—his residence,—and gain a foothold there.; The Russians managed to take Dargo for some time, but were forced to leave it and return to the controlled zone through Chechen territory due to attacks costing supplies, which were also lost in the mountain gorges.; The forces of Vorontsov (the leader of campaign) were saved from a rout thanks to Freitag's detachment. This called "a Pyrrhic victory" ["Россия в Кавказской войне", Zvezda, 2, St. Petersburg, 1997].

Belligerents
Caucasian Imamate	Russian Empire

Commanders and leaders
Imam Shamil; Soib-Mulla †; Eldar Aukh †; Isa Gendergen; Talkhig of Shali; Hadji Murad; Baysangur of Benoa	(Russian Empire) Mikhail Vorontsov; (Russian Empire) Kluki von Klugenau; (Russian Empire) D. V. Passek †; (Russian Empire) V. M. Viktorov †; (Russian Empire) R. K. Freitag; (Russian Empire) A. N. Lüders; (Russian Empire) A. I. Baryatinsky

Strength
5,000	9,050 in action: • 7,490 infantrymen; • 1,218 cavalrymen; • 342 gunners; 18,000 in total

Casualties and losses
Unknown	Vorontsov's forces: 4 generals, 186 officers, c. 4,000 soldiers Freitag's rescue detachment: 14 killed and 70 wounded men

The Battle(s) of Dargo or Dargo Campaign (Russian: Даргинский поход, romanized: Darginskiy pokhod) of 1845 was a series of military actions during the Murid War, the eastern phase of the Caucasus War of 1817–1864. During the campaign, Mikhail Vorontsov penetrated too deeply into enemy country, was surrounded, and partially fought his way out with heavy losses and was rescued by General R. K. Freitag.

The campaign exposed the difficulties posed in moving a large army through a forested region. With heavy supplies and many wounded, the army became strung out when it was attacked from both sides, while the front and rear could not protect each other. Once discipline is not maintained, a faster group bunched up with the men ahead, causing them to lose contact with the men to the rear, resulting in isolated groups to be attacked.

== Background ==
Following the Siege of Akhoulgo in 1839, Imam Shamil moved about 45 km northwest to the forests of Chechnya and established himself at Dargo. Dargo is somewhere in a forested north-south valley about 33 km south of the flat country where the Russians had their forts. It is drained north by a branch of Aksay river. For the 1842 attempt to reach Dargo see Battle of Ichkeria. The troops of the imamat in this battle were united under the general command of Mudir Suaib Ersinoevsky.

In 1844 Count Vorontsov was appointed Viceroy of the Caucasus replacing Aleksandr Neidgart. Emperor Nicholas I wanted a deep penetration and permanent occupation of Shamil's dominion. Having little local knowledge he thought this might involve the occupation of Andi about 18 km south of Dargo.

When Vorontsov reached the country, he found that the local generals opposed this plan, particularly Prince Argutisky-Dolgorukov and General Freitag. As he studied the situation and drew up plans he had more and more doubts, but felt that he must obey the Czar. His final plan was to move south, then southwest and attack Dargo from the south. (Baddeley does not explain why this roundabout route was chosen. It may have been to avoid the forests. He also does not explain why there was no blocking force to the north.) Shamil knew that he could not defeat a large force in open battle. He therefore planned to harass the Russians, let them wear themselves out and use up supplies as they penetrated further from their base and take more decisive action as circumstances permitted.

== The march ==
On 26 May he headed south from Fort Vnezapnaya near the modern Endirey about 42 km northeast of Dargo, with 12 battalions, 2 companies of sappers, 13 sotnias (hundreds) of cavalry, over 1,000 native militia and 28 guns. On 3 June at Gertma 20 km south southeast of Vnezapnaya he was joined from the east by the Dagestan column with 9 battalions, 2 more companies of sappers, 3 sotnias of cavalry and 18 guns. He now had about 18,000 men. He was also accompanied by a number of aristocrats who wanted to be in on the victory (Prince Alexander of Hesse-Darmstadt, Prince Wittgenstein, the Prince of Warsaw, Gurko, the chief of the general staff, Generals Luders, Passek, Klugenau and others). Their fancy equipment and servants did not help. The same day he moved west and reached Old Bourtournai without opposition (modern Burtunay is 9 km west of Gertma).

A reconnaissance force reached the 8,000-foot Kirk Pass and the whole force crossed it and stormed the opposite height against weak opposition. (This is probably the high plateau 20 km southeast of Burtunay. The modern road skirts it to the east through the Kharib Pass, so he may have gone the wrong way. This is part of the Andi Ridge which separates rivers that flow north to the Terek River from those that flow south into the Andi Koysu River.) Passek rashly went 15 km further, was isolated and caught in a sudden cold snap where 450 men were frostbitten and 500 horses died. Vorontsov followed and on 12 June reached Tsititl which Shamil had fortified and then abandoned.

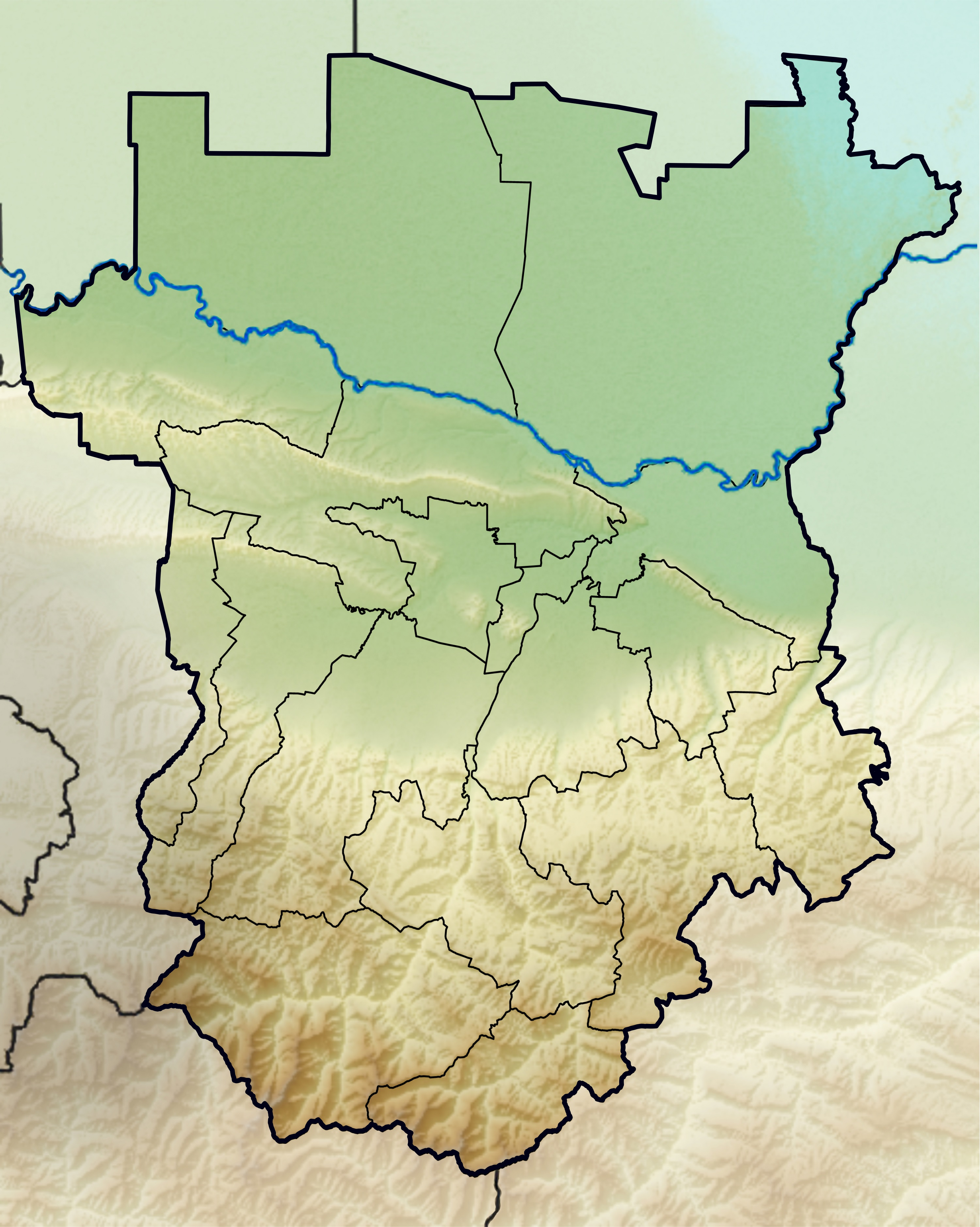
Places mentioned on a map of Chechnya
The Georgian Military Road is about 12km to the left of the map.
The Caspian Sea is about 60 km to the right.

On 14 June they went west through the Andi Gates down to the broad the valley of Andi and Gagatli. Shamil had burned these and removed the inhabitants and food. They were now about 20 km south of Dargo. Shamil held 'Mount Aval' with 5,000 men, but he was forced off this position (this is probably the one to the north, but the one to the south seems to be called Azal.) By the 17th Vorontsov was sure that Andi could not be held. It would be difficult to supply in summer and impossible to supply in winter. The men were already on short rations, but he still had 10,000 men, the rest being strung out along the supply line, and Dargo was not far north. Vorontsov waited almost three weeks at Andi to build up supplies, but they were consumed almost as fast as they arrived. (Badeley does not explain why Shamil did not attack the supply lines.) Seeing that this was getting nowhere he made plans to start for Dargo on 6 July.

== Dargo ==
At 3am on 6 July a native in the Russian service stole Vorontsov's favorite horse and galloped off the warn Shamil. The march began an hour later and around noon stopped on a high place to eat and look down on the hills and valleys to the north. Before them was the road to Dargo along the wooded crest of a ridge. Nowhere very wide, it was a series of descents broken by shorter rises and blocked every few hundred yards by felled timber. They started moving about 1 pm.

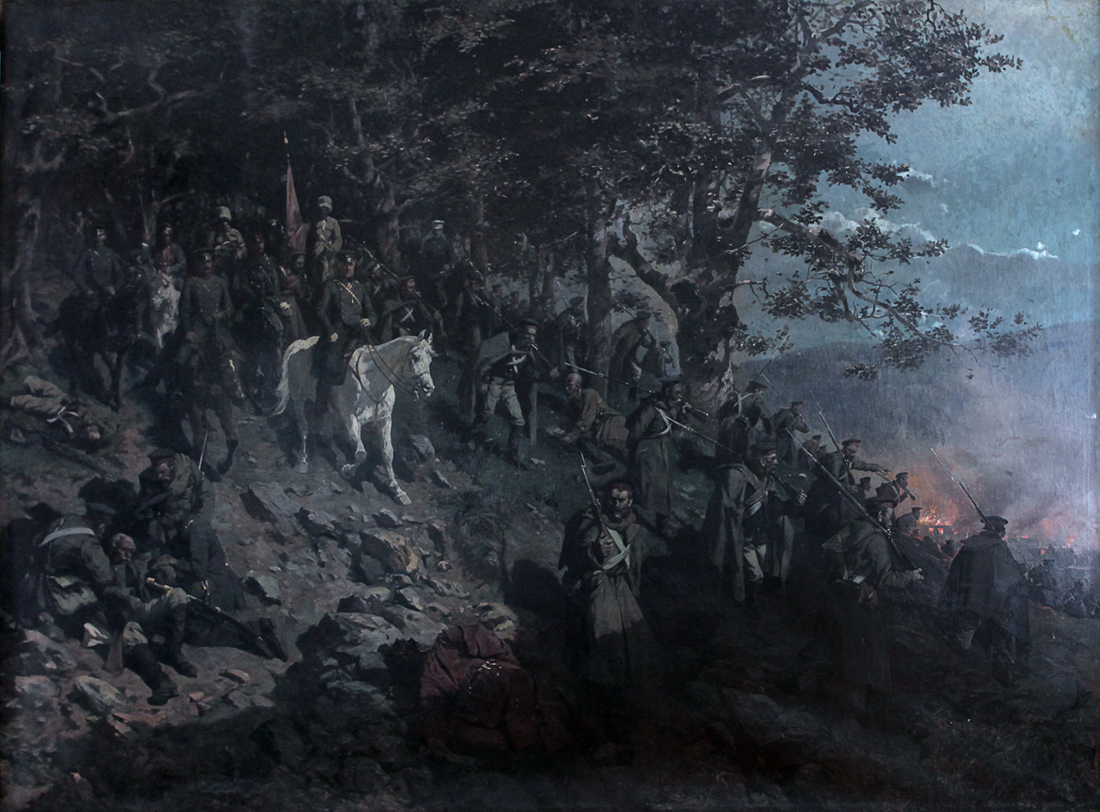
The taking of aul Dargo, painting by Franz Roubaud 1887.

The vanguard pushed ahead followed by sappers to clear the road. If the vanguard got too far ahead or the line broke up the intervening space would fill with Chechens and the groups attacked in detail. Vorontsov was caught in such a place and was in great danger until a group of dismounted Cossacks and Georgian militia cleared the surrounding woods. The vanguard reached an open space from which they could look down on Dargo. They waited until Vorontsov came up. He ordered Belyavsky to take the village, which Shamil had set on fire, and by 11pm Vorontsov was in Dargo. The loss on this day was 1 general, 3 other officers and 32 men killed and 169 wounded.

They now had provisions for five days. Shamil placed 4 guns on a hill to the west and opened harassing fire. He also had some deserters mock the Russians by playing Russian music from the hill. General Labintsev went up the hill to clear them off, the enemy withdrew, on the way back they were ambushed with a loss of 187 men, and Shamil reoccupied the hill. Vorontsov forbade volley-firing during burials so that Shamil could not count the dead. On the evening of the 9th a rocket announced the arrival of the supply convoy. Since it was unlikely that they could reach Dargo themselves, Vorontsov organized a column under General Klugenau to escort them over the mountain.

The column started on the morning of 10 July. The barriers had been restored and Shamil's men were thicker. The generals were too aggressive, the front became separated from the rear and isolated groups were cut down. By nightfall they reached open ground near the summit. (Baddely does not explain how they interacted with the supply column or what supplies and reinforcements they obtained from it.) Klugenau now had to contemplate crossing that terrible ridge for a third time. He considered continuing east to Dagestan and letting Vorontsov fight his way out to the north, but changed his mind. He started on the morning of 11 July. The barriers were restored and there was heavy rain. At one point there was a barrier made of fallen trees and mutilated Russian corpses. It was not held but was enfiladed by breastworks on either side. In clearing these General Passek was killed. The sappers had poor orders, tried to clear the barrier and were cut down. The Kabarda battalion ran out of ammunition, formed square as well as they could and waited with bayonets until they were rescued. (Baddeley does not say when the column reached Dargo) The losses on the 10th and 11th were 2 generals, 17 officers and 537 men killed, 32 officers and 738 men wounded, 3 guns were lost, and hardly any of the supplies reached Dargo.

== The breakout ==
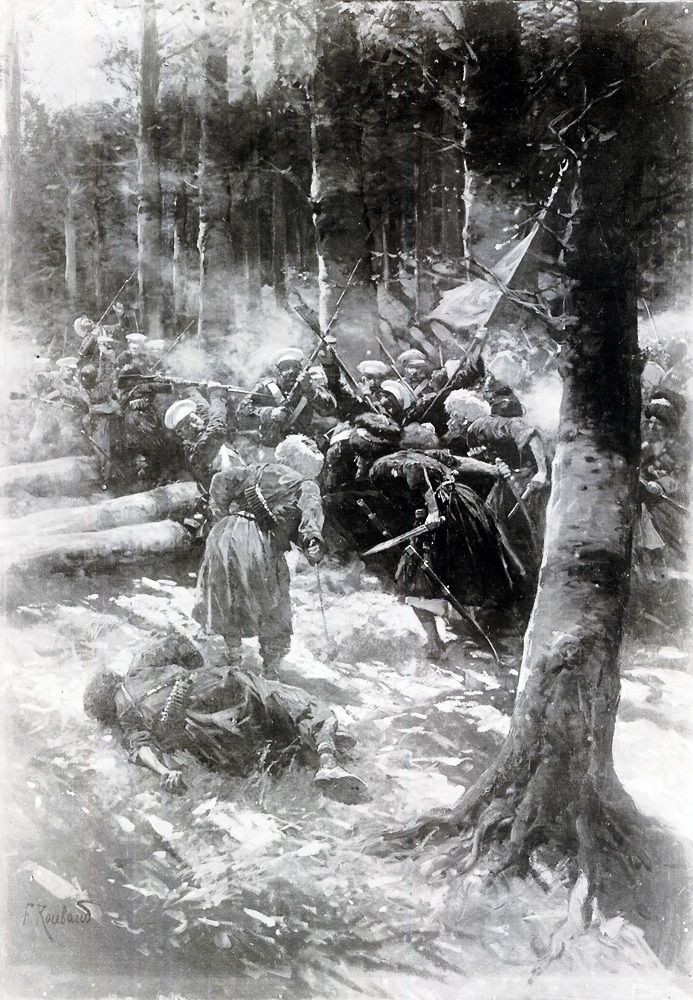
Fight in the Caucasus (Dargo), by Franz Roubaud 1895.

During 13 to 16 July, there were now 5,000 fighters, 1,100 wounded to care for and little to eat. Voronsov decided to break out north to Gerzel (Baddeley says 41 versts north). He sent five separate messengers to Freitag at Grozny 60 km northwest requesting assistance. The 12th was spent preparing the march and destroying all unnecessary supplies. At dawn on the 13th they started north along the west side of the Aksay and by night reached Tsentroy 5 km north. The next night they were 12 km north at Isay-Yurt, after much fighting, having lost in two days 7 officers and 70 men killed and adding 24 officers and 225 men to the train of the wounded. On the 15th they covered 4 km to Alleroy at a cost of 15 killed and 66 wounded. The 16th was the worst day. They covered the 5 km to Shovkhal-Berdy through forests and gullies at a cost of 109 killed and 416 wounded. Since leaving Dargo they had lost 1,000 men, there were more than 2,000 wounded, less than 3 fighters to protect and carry each wounded man and their provisions had come to an end. The cannon were without ammunition and the men had 50 rounds each. One writer claimed that Vorontsov considered abandoning the wounded and fighting his way out with the healthy men, but this does not seem to be true. They could go no further and they spent the 17th and 18th waiting for Freitag and hoping that the messengers had gotten through. Late in the afternoon they heard the muffled sound of cannon to the north.

All five messengers, two Russians and three natives, got through. News reached Freitag at Grozny around midnight of the 15/16th. Freitag had foreseen something of the sort and had troops spread out between Grozny and Gerzel. At 9pm on the 18th his advanced guard sighted the camp. The next day Vorontsov joined him and on 20 July the whole force was safe in Gerzel. On the last day one company got left behind and was destroyed, only 3 men escaping. The final day's losses were 81 killed and 148 wounded. Freitag lost 14 killed and 28 wounded.

Total losses for the campaign were 3 generals, 195 officers and 3,433 privates killed or wounded, and 3 guns.

=== Losses ===
According to the estimate of the military historian M. I. Markov, the total losses of the expedition to the village of Dargo amounted to 5,000 people.

The expedition ended sadly: the Russians lost 5,000 men and three cannons and were rescued only by the oncoming movement of Freytag's detachment.

Material losses were also huge – horses, military vehicles, artillery and other military equipment. Russian generals in the Caucasus killed 7,000 soldiers over the course of several years, and Prince Vorontsov lost 7,000 of his own men in one go.

Major general participant in the battle E. von Schwarzenberg wrote that the Dargin expedition was a significant campaign, during which the troops suffered huge losses in generals, officers, and lower ranks, and out of 20,000 men of the detachment, no more than 5,000 remained. After that, Prince Vorontsov became extremely cautious and avoided making large expeditions into the enemy country.

== Legacy ==
The Caucasus, an anti-imperialist poem by Ukrainian author Taras Shevchenko, was inspired by the death of one of Shevchenko's friends during the campaign.

== See also ==
- Battle of Ichkeria (1842)
