= Shuaib-Mulla of Tsentara =

- Born: 1804; Biltaul, Aukh, Chechnya
- Died: March 1844 (aged 39–40); Tsentaroi, Chechnya, Caucasian Imamate
- Military career
- Allegiance: Caucasian Imamate
- Branch: Army
- Rank: Marshal
- Nickname: Marshal of the Forests
- Conflicts: Caucasian War; Battle of Ichkeria

Shuaib-Mulla of Tsentara (Chechen: Shoip-Molloy Tsontoroin; Russian: Шоип-Мулла Цонтороевский) was a North Caucasian commander and naib of the Caucasian Imamate during the Caucasian War. He was one of Imam Shamil's closest associates and was nicknamed the "Marshal of the Forests" for his skill in guerrilla warfare by Count Pavel Grabbe. A fortress named after him, the Shuaib-Mullah fortress, was erected in the early years of the Imamate and was considered impregnable by the Chechens.

== Biography ==
Shuaib was born in the village of Biltaul (modern Tukhchar of the Novolaksky district of Dagestan) in 1804 into the family of the scientist Muhammad-Hadji. Muhammad-mullah was not only a prominent Arabist scientist, educator, but is also reported to have enjoyed great respect and authority among the Chechens, for a long time he headed the Chechen national council (Mekhkan Khel) in Nokhch-Mokhk.

In his youth, Shuaib received a good education and showed a great aptitude for science. In addition to his native Chechen, Shuaib is reported to have spoken Arabic, Kumyk and Avar.

Shuaib's father Muhammad initially wanted his son to study sciences, and at first Shuaib was aimed at deep study of sciences. For some time he worked as a mullah. However, the outbreak of the Caucasian War changed his plans. At the onset of the Caucasian war, he became one of the most active participants in the active resistance against the Russian Empire. In 1829 Shuaib became a murid and an active assistant to the first imam of the Caucasian Imamate Ghazi Muhammad. However, after his death, Shuaib retires from active military activities. From 1834 Shuaib served as a mullah in the village of Aku-Yurt for 4 years. The tsarist command did not forgive him for active participation in the military campaigns of Imam Gazi-Muhammad and began taking measures to kill him or win him over by promising all kinds of benefits and positions. Shuaib rejected any proposals from the authorities. To avoid arrest, in 1838 he fled to the mountains of Ichkeria, where he became an associate of Sheikh Tash-Khadzhi.

Description of Shuaib-Mullah by a captured Russian soldier:

Shuaib is small in stature, dark complexion with small mountain ash, dexterous in all techniques, and especially on horseback. He is known as a man with a cunning and lively mind, as an excellent warrior, a dashing rider and a skillful leader in battle.

— E. A. Verderevsky, Плен у Шамиля (1856)

== Shuaib-Mullah Fortress ==
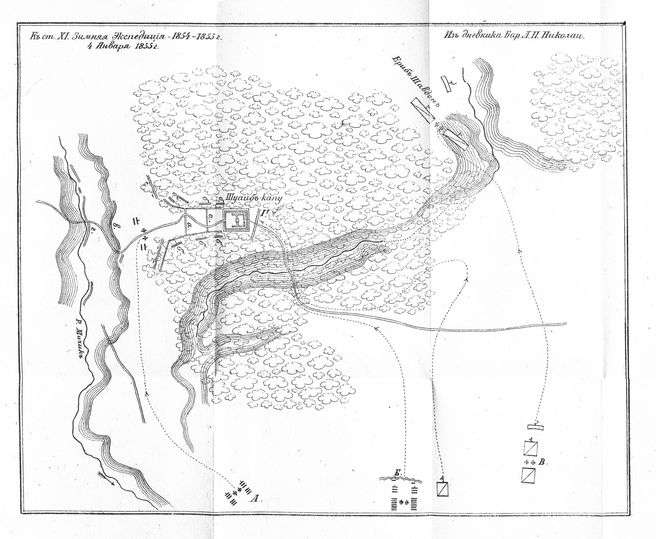
Fortress of Shuaib (1855)

The "Shuaib-Mullah fortress" (Chechen:"Shuaiban Ghap") was erected during the early years of the Caucasian Imamate by the Chechen architect and Naib Yusuf-Hazhi Safarov. It was first mentioned in 1840 and was a notorious hard fortress to overtake. Many Russian generals sought to “capture the enemy's fortification of Shuaib-fortress, which the Chechens considered impregnable and which for many years, despite the proximity of many strong detachments, remained untouched”.

A. Zisserman described the fortress in detail:

The fortification was really arranged in such a way that even a hundred people could stubbornly defend themselves and the assault, with the depth of a wide ditch, with a breastwork crowned with loopholes, with an internal construction of thick logs, which served as a second defense like a citadel, would undoubtedly cost a lot of people In addition, there were side obstructions and notches outside the fortification, designed for the resistance of a large party, and in the rear there were also various artificial structures to cover retreating people

— A. Zisserman, The History of the 80th Kabardian Infantry General-Field Marshal Prince Baryatinsky Regiment

N. A. Volkonsky also left a description of the fortress: "This fortification was located behind Michik (Kurchaloy), in the forest. Although it was small, it had a good defense. Shamil considered it a stronghold of greater Chechnya. Troops marched near and around it many times, but did not dare to storm, fearing great losses. In early January 1855, by order of General AE Wrangel, the "Shuaib-Ghap" fortification was taken by the detachment of Baron Nikolai".

== Pioneership in the field of forest warfare ==
The Chechens, in the opinion of many researchers, were the first to employ the tactic of creeping troops, brought up exemplary mountain cavalry with such truly immortal examples as Kazbich, Beibulat, Talkhig, laid the foundation for horse-mountain artillery and invented "nomadic batteries." They created a "blockage" of the enemy - the prototype of an infantry trench and fortified point, and deeply thought out the theory of an elastic front. All this then arose with Totleben in Sevastopol and Baklanov in Poland, but it was never studied in full. Europe marveled at the Cossacks and studied, forgetting or not knowing that it was not the primary source of the methods of partisan warfare, the researcher writes. - So, for example, the war of dispersion, brilliantly carried out by one of the most talented commanders of the Imamate, Shoip-Molloy Tsontoroin, still remains unexplored. With surprising completeness, it surpassed what the modern theory of small war came to almost a century later.

— Nikolai Alexandrovich Smirnov, Muridism in the Caucasus
