= Shapi Kaziev =

Russian writer (1956–2020)

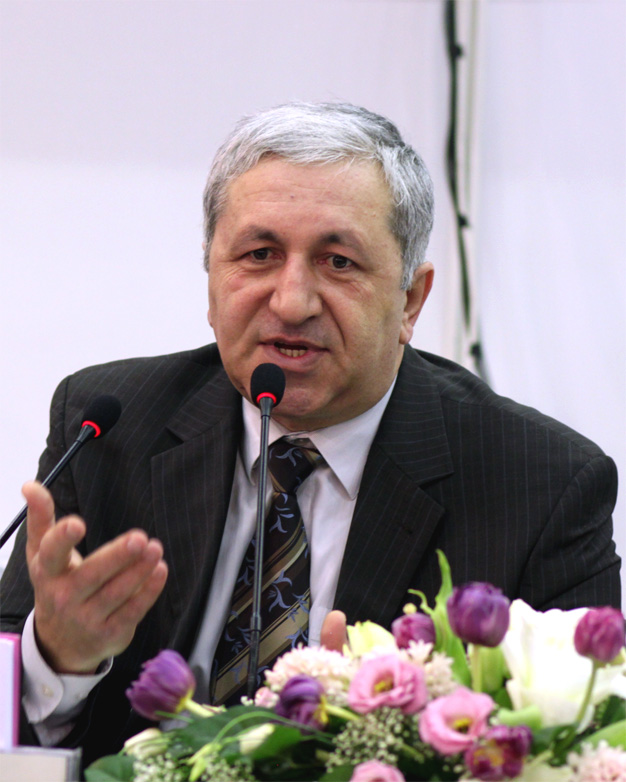
- Born: Shapi Magomedovitch Kaziev; 27 March 1956; Makhachkala, Dagestan ASSR, Russian SFSR
- Died: 20 March 2020 (aged 63); Makhachkala, Russian Federation
- Occupation: Novelist

Shapi Magomedovitch Kaziev (Russian: Шапи́ Магомедович Кази́ев; 27 March 1956 – 20 March 2020) was a Russian writer, playwright and script writer. An Avar by ethnicity, he was the author of historical novels and other books.

== Life and career ==
Kaziev was born in Makhachkala, in the Dagestan ASSR, and lived in Moscow since 1974. His education in scriptwriting was with the faculty of VGIK (now known as the State Cinematography University). His cinematic debut was the screenplay of the movie Breakfast (Lenfilm). He was author of the film Rasul Gamzatov ("My Way"). He was awarded the 2003 special prize of the "Eurasian Kaleidoscope" Documentary Film Competition.

Kaziev was a productive playwright. In addition to comedies and avant garde plays, he wrote historical dramas. His first published play was the Answering machine, Modern Drama, No. 3, 1986. In 1987 his play on Imam Shamil (Captive) was published. He made his stage debut with the play Newcomer (in Moscow, 1987). His plays have been staged in Russian and foreign theaters and on the radio.

He was a member of the USSR Union of Writers since 1989.

In 1992 he founded the "Echo of the Caucasus" Publishing House in Moscow and became its editor-in-chief (for the magazine of the same name and books on Caucasian culture and folklore).

He gained literary popularity from his book Imam Shamil in series "The Lives of Remarkable People" ("Molodaya gvardiya" Press, Moscow). Four editions have been published from 2001 to 2010.

He wrote in different genres (prose, drama, poetry, etc.). He also wrote for children.

The total circulation of his books is over 50,000 copies. He won domestic and international literary prizes and competitions.

He was involved in civic activities in the field of international relations and participated in international academic congresses and peace projects.

== List of works ==
(Russian titles in parentheses)

- Paints of exile. Novel
- Imam Shamil (Имам Шамиль) "Molodaya Gvardiya" Press. Moscow, 2001, 2003, 2006, 2010. ISBN 978-5-235-03332-0
- Akhoulgo. Caucasian War of 19th century (Ахульго). "Epoch", Publishing house. Makhachkala, 2008. ISBN 978-5-98390-047-9
- Crash of tyrant. Nadir Shah (Крах тирана). The historical novel about defeat the army of Nadir Shah in Daghestan. "Epoch", Publishing house. Makhachkala, 2009. ISBN 978-5-98390-066-0
- Caucasian highlanders (Повседневная жизнь горцев Северного Кавказа в XIX в.). Everyday life of the Caucasian highlanders. 19th century (In the co-authorship with I.Karpeev). "Molodaya Gvardiya" publishers. Moscow, 2003. ISBN 5-235-02585-7
- East harem Everyday life of East harem (Повседневная жизнь восточного гарема). "Molodaya Gvardiya" publishers. Moscow, 2006. ISBN 5-235-02853-8
- East harem Collection of alive jewelry. Audio book. (Восточный гарем. Коллекция живых драгоценностей). CD сom, Moscow, 2006. ISBN АВ-МР3-436
- In paradise, travel. Plays (В раю, проездом. Книга пьес). Makhachkala, 2008. ISBN 978-5-297-01454-1
- Highlander's ABC Book (Горская азбука). Makhachkala, 1995. Moscow, 2002. ISBN 5-900054-07-1

== Awards ==
- Prize of Sheikh Saud аl Babtin. 1998
- Prize of the Union of Journalists of Moscow and the Government of Moscow. 1999
- Prize "Best feathers of Russia". 1999
- Prize of the Union of journalists of Russia "For professional skill". 2001.
- Big literary prize it. Rasul Gamzatov. 2008.
- Prize "Best books of year". 2009.
