= Talkhig of Shali =

North Caucasian general (1800–1861)

- Шелар Тӏалхиг
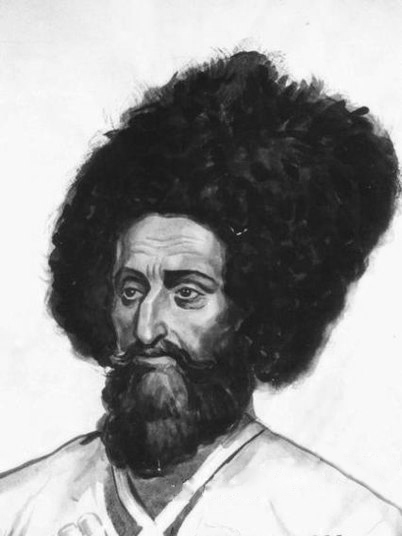
- Naib Talkhig Shalinsky (Argunsky)
- Born: c. 1800; Shali, Chechnya
- Died: 1861; Shali, Caucasian Imamate
- Military career
- Allegiance: Caucasian Imamate
- Branch: Army
- Service years: 1840–1859
- Rank: Lieutenant General
- Commands: Artillery Corps
- Conflicts: Caucasian War; Battle of Ichkeria (1842); Battle of Dargo (1845); Battle of Gordali (1852)

Talkhig of Shali (Note: Chechen: Шелар Тӏалхиг, romanized: Shelar Thalkhig, Russian: Талхиг Шалинский, romanized: Talkhig Shalinskiy) was a 19th-century commander from the North Caucasia. A native of Shali and a representative of the taip Kurchaloy, he was a military leader and statesman of the North Caucasian Imamate. He was also a mudir (general-naib) and head of artillery of the North Caucasian Imamate, as well as a naib of the districts of Shali and Greater Chechnya.

== Chronology ==
In August 1845, Talkhig was appointed the leader of Greater Chechnya. From the summer of 1850 until the end of the Caucasian War, the fortification of Talkhig was repeatedly attacked by Russian troops under the command of Major General P. S. Sleptsov, Baron E. I. Meidel, Prince A. I. Baryatinsky, Baron A. E. Wrangel, Baron L. P. Nikolai and Count N. I. Evdokimov.

February 8–11, 1849, when cutting a clearing in the direction of the Shali glade, he participated in the battle with the troops of colonels E. I. Meidel and Seryabrekov.

January 24 - March 8, 1850. Cutting of clearing to Shali. Artillery of Talkhig takes part in the battles for the Shali Forest.

January 8–24, 1851, when cutting a clearing along the Bass River, Talkhig successfully repulsed the attacks of General L. P. Nikolai on the Shali trenches.

On February 20, 1851, on the Bass River, he took part in the battle against the detachment of General I. A. Vrevsky.

On September 27, 1851, Baryatinsky defeated General Talkhig Shalin at the village of Churtogay. On December 30, 1853, Talkhig participated in the battle against the detachment of Russian Major-General Baklanov at the village of Gordali.

On September 28, 1854, together with Eski Mishchikovsky, Talkhig participated in the battle against the detachment Wrangel on the Argun River.

In 1859 Talkhig gave in and retired. He wrote a chronicle in Arabic. He died from the consequences of wounds received in battles. Talkhig was buried in the village of Shali.

== Artillery tactics ==
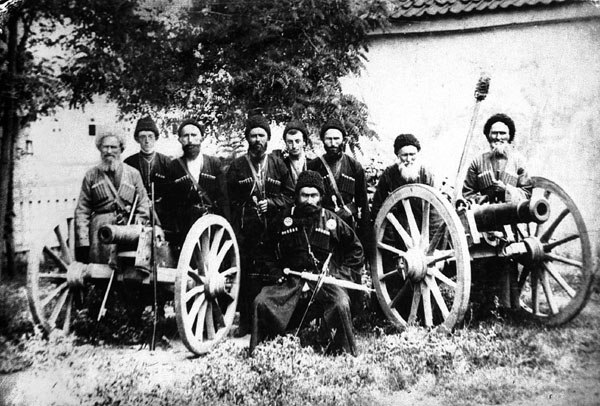
Chechen artillerymen

General Talkhig laid the foundation for horse-mountain artillery and one of the earliest inventors of the "Nomadic artillery" tactics refereed today as Shoot-and-scoot according to the Russian historian and professor Nikolay Smirnov.

For the Tsarist troops, Talkhig's innovations were completely unexpected. Talkhig's artillery was practically elusive: having given several shots from guns at the tsarist troops, he quickly moved on a horse-drawn carriage to another place, from where he again inflicted damage on the Russians. This was repeated periodically. Dragoons and Cossacks who rushed to the sound of shots did not find artillery on the spot. The Russians called this tactic of the mountaineers "nomadic artillery".

— Dalhan Khozaev, Чеченцы в Русско-Кавказской войне, Чеченцы в Русско-Кавказской войне
