= Battle of Ichkeria =

1842 battle in Chechnya

- Part of the Murid War
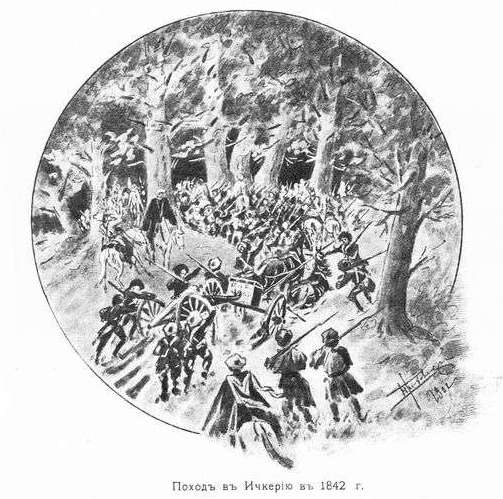
- The Battle of Ichkeria. Брюховецкий Г. А.
Date	30 May – 2 June 1842
Location	Ichkeria, Chechnya, Caucasian Imamate
Result	North Caucasian victory

Belligerents
Caucasian Imamate	Russian Empire

Commanders and leaders
Shuaib-Mulla of Tsentara; Ullubey Aukh; Suaib-Mulla; Jawatkhan of Dargo †; Talkhig of Shali	(Russian Empire) Pavel Grabbe (Russian Empire) I. M. Labyntsev

Strength
Less than 2,000	10,000

Casualties and losses
300	4,000 killed or wounded

The Battle of Ichkeria (1842) was an attempt by General Grabbe to take Imam Shamil's capital at Dargo during the Murid War. It mainly failed due to the difficulty of moving a large force through the forest.

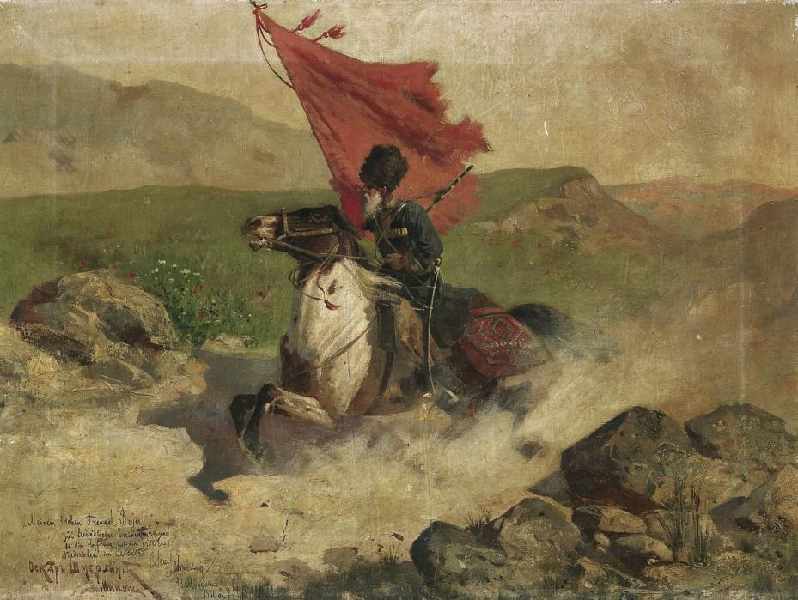
Caucasian Soldier Riding at a Gallop by Oskar Schmerling., (1893)

After his defeat at Akhulgo in 1839, Shamil established a new headquarters at Dargo in a forested valley in Chechnya about 33 kilometres (21 mi) south of the Russian lines. The region was called Ichkeria. In late 1841 Count Grabbe visited Saint Petersburg and persuaded Nicholas I to give him command of the forces on the Left Flank and northern Dagestan, that is, the area north and east of Dargo. From at least 21 March 1842, Shamil and most of his men were fighting at Kazi-Kumukh about 115 kilometres (71 mi) southeast of Dargo. Grabbe decided to attack Shamil's capital in his absence.

Grabbe's intention was to march quickly south to Dargo, destroy it, and then move south over the mountain and take Andi and Gumbet. He had 10,000 men and 24 guns. The size of his force worked against him. To carry his supplies he needed a large number of carts and 3,000 horses. Because of the poor roads, or trails, through the forest the baggage train strung out over several versts {kilometers} and it took half his force to guard it on both sides. With several battalions for front and rear guard, the various parts of the line could not protect each other. In addition to the hills and rivers the mountaineers began to build barricades and set ambushes.

On 30 May {all dates old style, so add 12 days for the Western calendar}, Grabbe left Gerzel 33 kilometres (21 mi) north of Dargo. He went south along the left bank of the Aksay River, the same route as Vorontsov’s retreat in 1845. That day he made only 7 vests against no resistance (the sources do not say whether the Chechens had advance knowledge of the attack. If they had no warning it would have taken them several days to bring up their reserves). That night it rained heavily, making the road worse. On the second day they made 12 versts in 15 hours, fighting all the way. They were forced to camp for the night on a waterless plain. On the third day they made only 6 versts. The enemy had increased to something under 2,000, the roads were more difficult, barricades more frequent, the troops had been short of water for two days, there were already several hundred wounded and confusion increased hourly. On the night of the third day (1 June) Grabbe saw that further advance was impossible and gave orders to retreat along the same road.

The retreat was worse than the advance. It necessitated the abandonment, or, where possible, the destruction of everything that would slow their movements. The retreat became vary disorganized and assumed the appearance of a rout {The sources do not say whether this was due to command failure or whether there was some other problem}. On 4 June (the sixth day) they arrived back in Gerzel, having lost 66 officers, 1700 men, one field gun and nearly all their provisions and stores.

When Shamil heard of Grabbe’s movement he abandoned his perhaps unprofitable campaign and hurried back to Chechnya. When he arrived the fighting was already over. The impact of Grabbe's failure was even greater because he had faced only the local levies of two Naibs – Shu ‘ayb and Ullubey. A month later Grabbe made an unsuccessful raid against Igali on the Andi Koysu. After this he was released from command at his own request. Grabbe's return was witnessed by Prince Chernyshev, the Minister of War. This contributed to Nicolas' decision to forbid all major raids into the interior, a policy that did not work well.

== Losses ==
According to the Chief of Staff of the Caucasian Line G. I. Philipson, the losses of the Grabbe detachment amounted to more than 4,000 killed and wounded.

The losses of the Chechens amounted to 300 people.

For the second attempt to take Dargo see Battle of Dargo (1845).

== See also ==
- Battle of Dargo (1845)
