= Caucasian War =

1817–1864 invasion of the Caucasus by the Russian Empire

- Part of the Russian conquest of the Caucasus
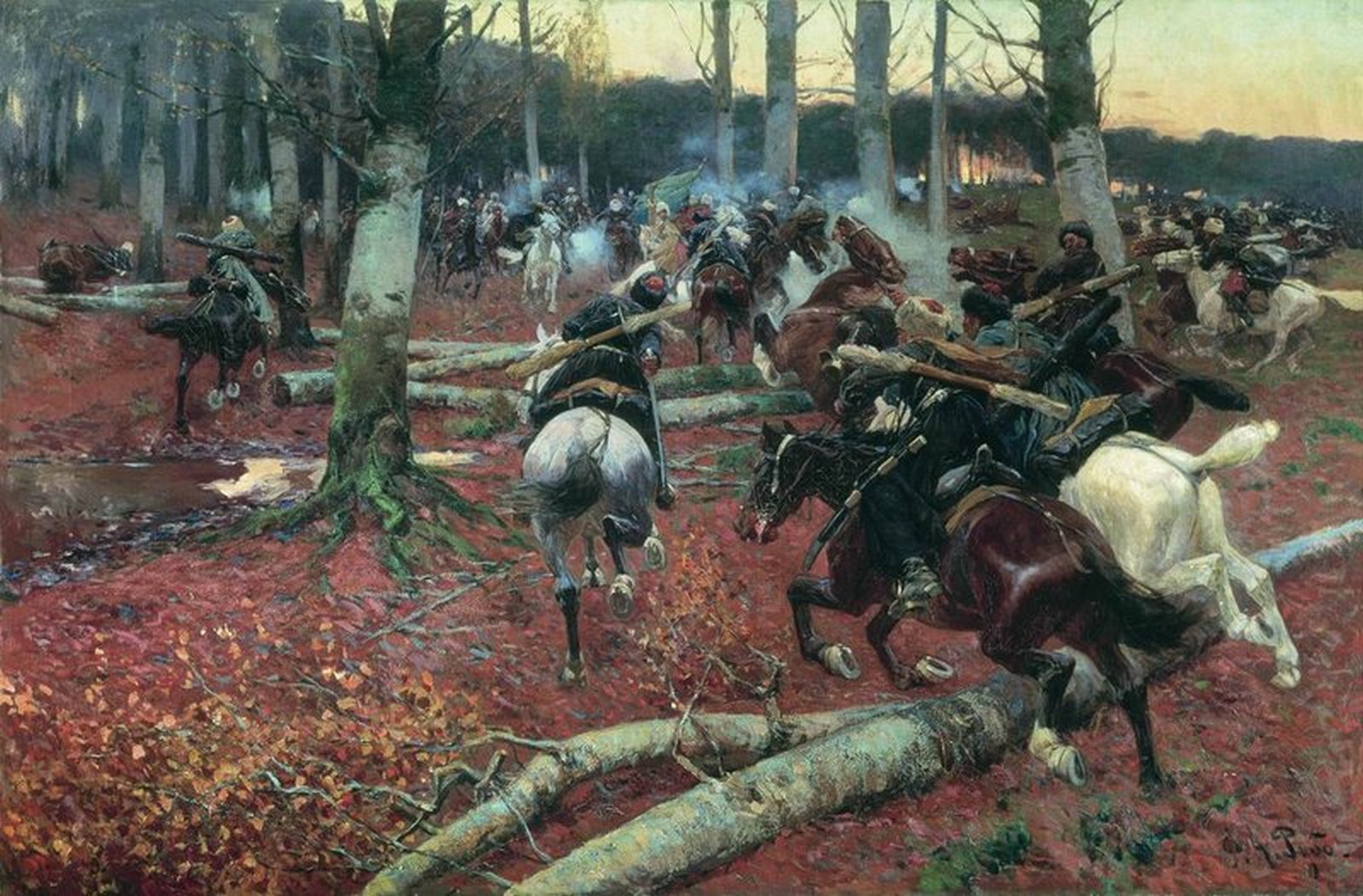
- Franz Roubaud's A Scene from the Caucasian War
Date	1817 – 21 May 1864
Location	North Caucasus
Result	Russian victory: Circassian genocide
Territorial changes	North Caucasus annexed by Russia

Belligerents
Russian Empire	Circassian Confederation: Circassian tribal regions: Abzakhs; Besleney Principality; Bzhedugs; Hatuqay Principality; Grand Principality of Kabardia; Mamkhegh; Natukhaj; Shapsugs; Chemguy Principality; Ubykh Principality; Yegeruqwai; Zhaney Principality ...and others; Caucasian Imamate: Tribes: Avars; Chechens; Lezgins; Ingush (Note: Bushuyev 1941: [In organizing the struggle for independence, [Imam Shamil] had to repeatedly force the same “free societies” of Dagestan, and then Chechnya and Ingushetia, to fight against Russian tsarism]; All-Union Scientific Conference 1989, p. 106: [It is known that the formation of the military-theocratic state, rightly called the Imamate of Shamil, and its heyday occurred in the 1840s and 1850s. During this period, the Imamate included almost all of Nagorno-Dagestan, all of Chechnya (with the exception of the area between the Terek and Suzhna rivers), most of Karabulak (the "Arshtkhoy Vilayet"), a number of communities in Ingushetia (the "Vilayet Kalai"), and some villages of the Tsorintsy and Galgay people.]; Shamil: Illustrated Encyclopedia 1997, p. 211: [It is known that the formation and flourishing of the military-theocratic state, rightly called the Imamate of Shamil, occurred in the 1840s and 1850s. During this period, the Imamate included virtually all of Nagorno-Dagestan, all of Chechnya (with the exception of the area between the Terek and Suzhna rivers), a number of communities in Ingushetia, and some villages of the Tsorini and Galgai people.]; Dadaev 2006, p. 223: [The fifth congress, a massive gathering, was convened on September 26, 1841, in the Imamate's capital, Dargo, to discuss measures to combat Russian tsarism. This was the beginning of Shamil's glorious era, when the Imamate incorporated the lands of the liquidated Avar Khanate, numerous unions of rural communities in mountainous and foothill Dagestan, almost all of Chechnya, Ingushetia, and individual villages in Khevsureti and Tusheti.]); Dargins; Kumyks; Karachays; Balkars; Ossetians; Tabasarans; Laks; (Kingdom of Galicia and Lodomeria) Polish volunteers

Commanders and leaders
(Russian Empire) Tsar Alexander I (Russian Empire) Tsar Nicholas I (Russian Empire) Tsar Alexander II (Russian Empire) Michael Nikolaevich (Russian Empire) Grigory Zass (WIA) (Russian Empire) Ivan Paskevich (Russian Empire) Aleksey Yermolov (Russian Empire) Mikhail Vorontsov (Russian Empire) Dmitry Milyutin (Russian Empire) Aleksandr Baryatinsky (Russian Empire) Ivan Andronnikov (Russian Empire) Grigory Rosen (Russian Empire) Yevgeny Golovin (Russian Empire) Nikolay Muravyov-Karsky (Russian Empire) Nikolay Yevdokimov (Russian Empire) Robert Segercrantz	Ghazi Mullah †; Hamzat Bek; Shamil of Gimry (surrendered); Tashaw-Hadji; Shuaib-Mulla of Tsentara; Hadji Murad; Isa of Ghendargen; Baysangur of Beno; Talkhig Shelar; Eska of Noiber; Umalat-bek of Boynak; Irazi-bek of Kazanysh; Idris of Endirey; Beibulat Taimiev; Kizbech Tughuzoqo †; Qerandiqo Berzeg; Seferbiy Zanuqo # Muhammad Amin Asiyalo; Jembulat Boletoqo X Qeysin Qeytuqo (United Kingdom of Great Britain and Ireland) James Stanislaus Bell (Kingdom of Galicia and Lodomeria) Teofil Lapinski

Strength
200,000	Caucasian Imamate: 20,000–25,000; Circassia: 35,000–40,000

Casualties and losses
96,275 combat losses; 24,946 killed; 65,322 wounded; 6,007 captured; 77,000 – 131,000 dead (incl. non-combat and civilians)	Civilian dead: 700,000; Total dead: High; Total dead: High

The Caucasian War or the Caucasus War (Note: Russian: Кавказская война, romanized: Kavkázskaya voyná, IPA: [kɐfˈkasːkəjə vɐjˈna]; Avar: Кавказалъул рагъ, romanized: Kavkazaļul raƣ; Chechen: Оьрсийн—кавказхойн тӀом, romanized: Örsiyn–kavkazxoyn thom; Georgian: კავკასიის ომი, romanized: K’avk’asiis omi; Ingush: Эрсий-кавказхой тӀом, romanized: Ersiy-kavkazxoy thom; Lezgian: Къавкъаздин дяве, romanized: Qavqazdin djave; Iron Ossetic: Кавказы хæст, romanized: Kavkazy xæst) was a 19th-century military conflict between the Russian Empire and various peoples of the North Caucasus who resisted subjugation during the Russian conquest of the Caucasus. It consisted of a series of military actions waged by the Russian Imperial Army and Cossack settlers against the native inhabitants such as the Adyghe, Abazins, Ubykhs, Chechens, Dagestanis as the Tsars sought to expand.

Other territories of the Caucasus (comprising contemporary eastern Georgia, southern Dagestan, Armenia and Azerbaijan) were incorporated into the Russian Empire at various times in the 19th century as a result of Russian wars with Persia. In 1801, Russia annexed the Georgian Kingdom of Kartli-Kakheti. The remaining part, western Georgia, was taken by the Russians from the Ottomans during the same period. Russian control of the Georgian Military Road in the center divided the Caucasian War into the Russo-Circassian War in the west and the conquest of Chechnya and Dagestan in the east.

== History ==
The war took place during the administrations of three successive Russian Tsars: Alexander I (reigned 1801–1825), Nicholas I (1825–1855), and Alexander II (1855–1881). The leading Russian commanders included Aleksey Petrovich Yermolov in 1816–1827, Mikhail Semyonovich Vorontsov in 1844–1853, and Aleksandr Baryatinskiy in 1853–1856. The famous Russian writer Leo Tolstoy, who gained much of his knowledge and experience of war for his book War and Peace from these encounters, took part in the hostilities. The Russian poet Alexander Pushkin referred to the war in his Byronic poem The Prisoner of the Caucasus (Кавказский пленник, Kavkazskiy plennik), written in 1821. Mikhail Lermontov, often referred to as "the poet of the Caucasus", participated in the battle near the river Valerik which inspired him to write the poem of the same name.

The Russian invasion encountered fierce resistance. The first period of the invasion ended coincidentally with the death of Alexander I and the Decembrist Revolt in 1825. It achieved surprisingly little success, especially compared with the then recent Russian victory over the Grande Armée of Napoleon in 1812.

Between 1825 and 1833, little military activity took place in the Caucasus against the native North Caucasians as wars with Turkey (1828/1829) and with Persia (1826–1828) demanded the Empire's attention. After considerable successes in both wars, Russia resumed fighting in the Caucasus against the various rebelling native ethnic groups in the North Caucasus. This marked the beginning of what is now referred to as the Circassian genocide. Russian units again met resistance, notably led by Ghazi Mollah, Hamzat Bek, and Hadji Murad. Imam Shamil followed them. He led the mountaineers from 1834 until his capture by Dmitry Milyutin in 1859. In 1843, Shamil launched a sweeping offensive aimed at the Russian outposts in Avaria. On 28 August 1843, 10,000 men converged from three different directions, on a Russian column in Untsukul, killing 486 men. In the next four weeks, Shamil captured every Russian outpost in Avaria except one, exacting over 2,000 casualties on the Russian defenders. He feigned an invasion north to capture a key chokepoint at the convergence of the Avar and Kazi-Kumukh rivers. In 1845, Shamil's forces achieved their most dramatic success when they withstood a major Russian offensive led by Prince Vorontsov.

During the Crimean War of 1853–1856, the Russians brokered a truce with Shamil, but hostilities resumed in 1855. Warfare in the Caucasus finally ended between 1856 and 1859, when a 250,000 strong army under General Baryatinsky broke the mountaineers' resistance.

The war in the Eastern part of the North Caucasus ended in 1859; the Russians captured Shamil, forced him to surrender, to swear allegiance to the Tsar, and then exiled him to Central Russia. However, the war in the Western part of the North Caucasus resumed with the Circassians (i.e. Adyghe, but the term is often used to include their Abaza kin as well) resuming the fight. A manifesto of Tsar Alexander II declared hostilities at an end on June 2 (May 21 OS), 1864.

== Aftermath ==
One of the most dramatic consequences was the mass forced emigration, or muhâjirism, of predominantly Muslim mountain populations from their homeland to the territories of the Ottoman Empire, and to a lesser degree Persia.

According to one source, the population in Kabardia decreased from 350,000, before the war, to 50,000 by 1818. According to another version, in 1790 the population was 200,000 people and in 1830 30,000 people. As a percentage of the total population of the North Caucasus, the number of the remaining Circassians was 40% (1795), 30% (1835) and 25% (1858). Similarly: Chechens 9%, 10% and 8.5%; Avars 11%, 7% and 2%; Dargins 9.5%, 7.3% and 5.8%; Lezghins 4.4%, 3.6% and 3.9%.

These demographic losses were accompanied by the confiscation of lands, resettlement of Cossack and Russian military colonists, and the re-organisation of the region’s ethnic composition in ways favourable to the imperial authorities. In the Ottoman territories, the exiled Circassians found themselves in a precarious survival situation. Many landed via Black Sea ports such as Trabzon, Samsun, and Varna, and were placed in camps or transit settlements under extremely harsh conditions of overcrowding, disease, hunger and exposure. For example, in Samsun alone, up to 110,000 refugees were gathered and more than 200 people died each day during certain phases of the transit. The Ottoman state sometimes used the Circassian newcomers for strategic settlement, such as establishing them as militia along border zones in the Danubian and Anatolian provinces.

Small numbers of the exiled did return, under conditional or partial circumstances. Documentation shows that in 1861-67 a few thousand individuals or families applied to return from exile to the Terek or Caucasus region, but the numbers were greatly reduced compared to the scale of the original movement.

== Gallery ==
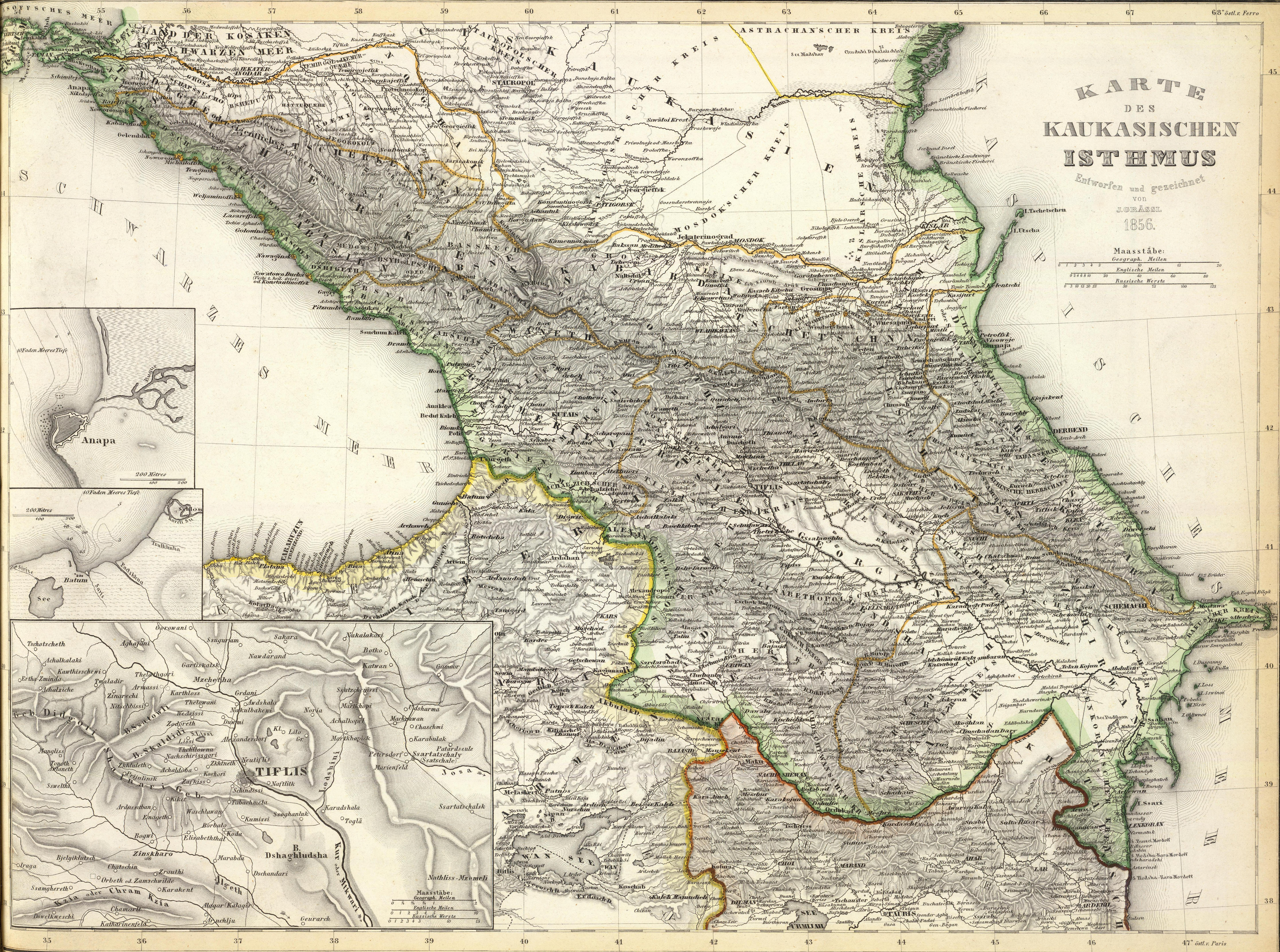
Map of the Caucasus isthmus. Created and drawn by J. Grassl, 1856.

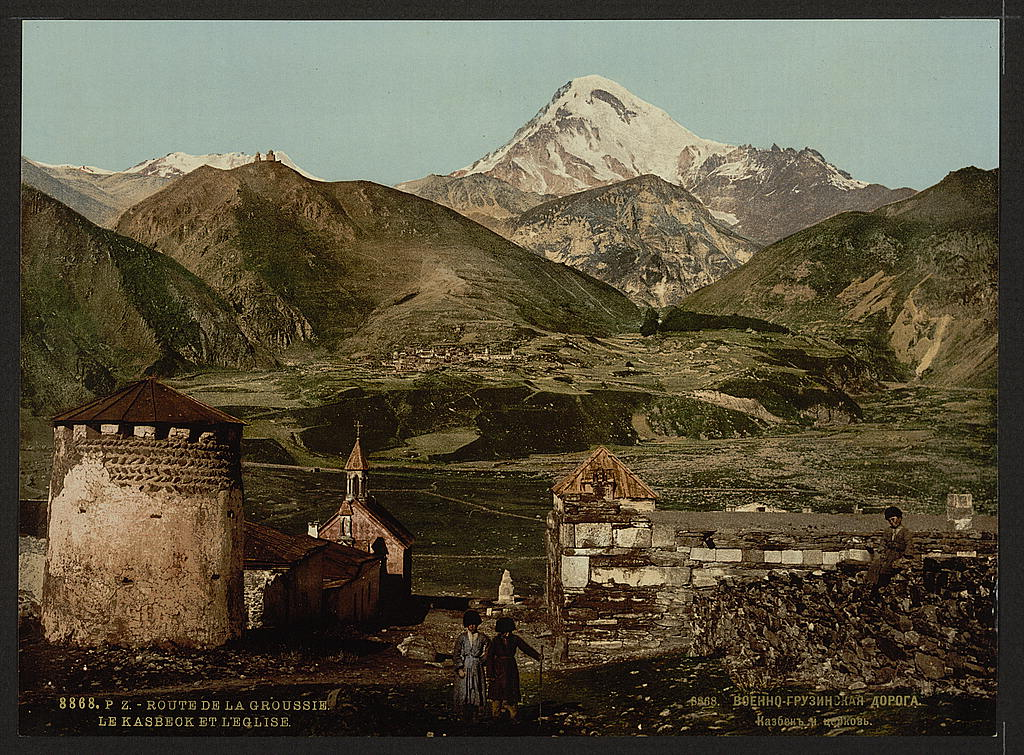
Construction of the Georgian Military Road through disputed territories was a key factor in the eventual Russian success

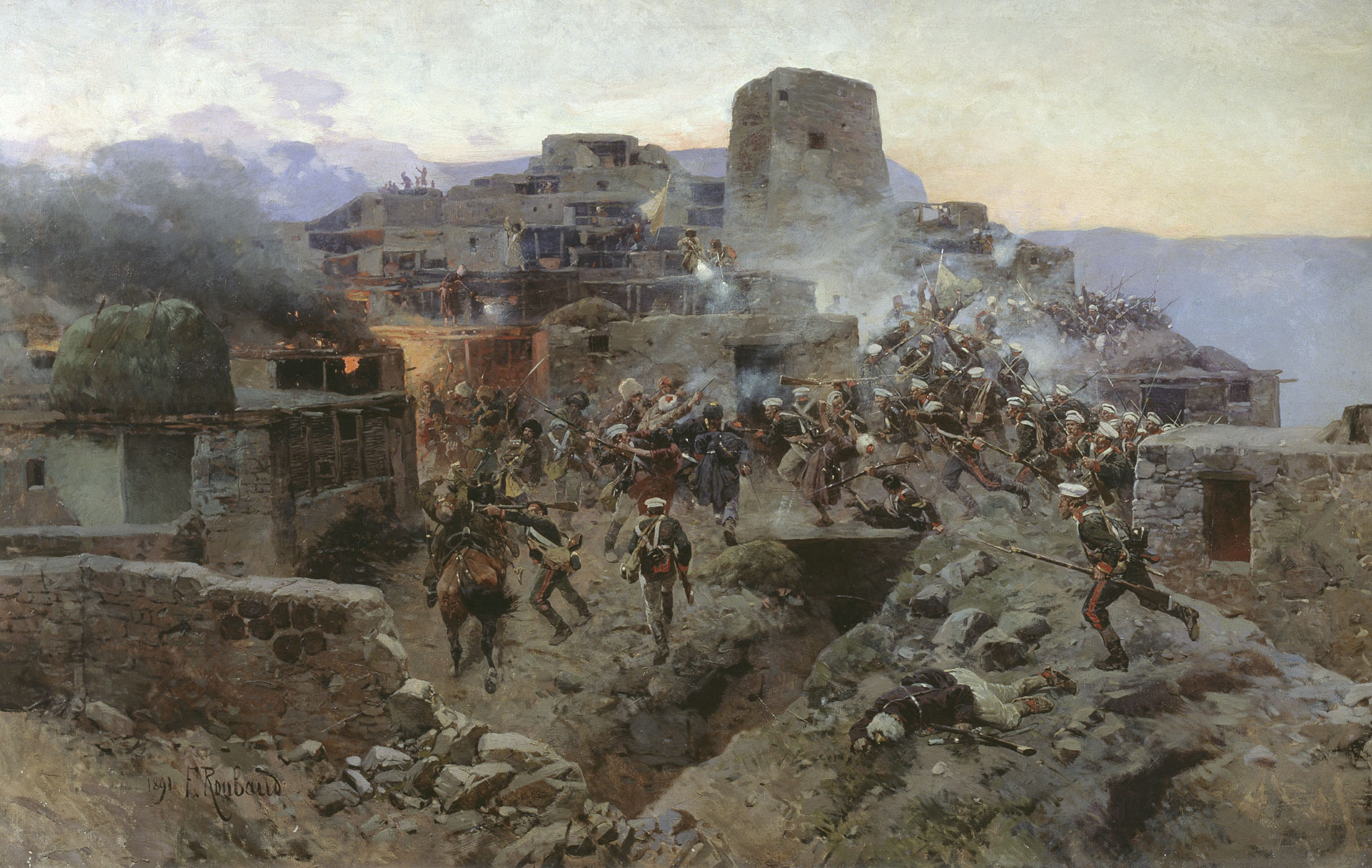
Assault of Gimry, by Franz Alekseyevich Roubaud

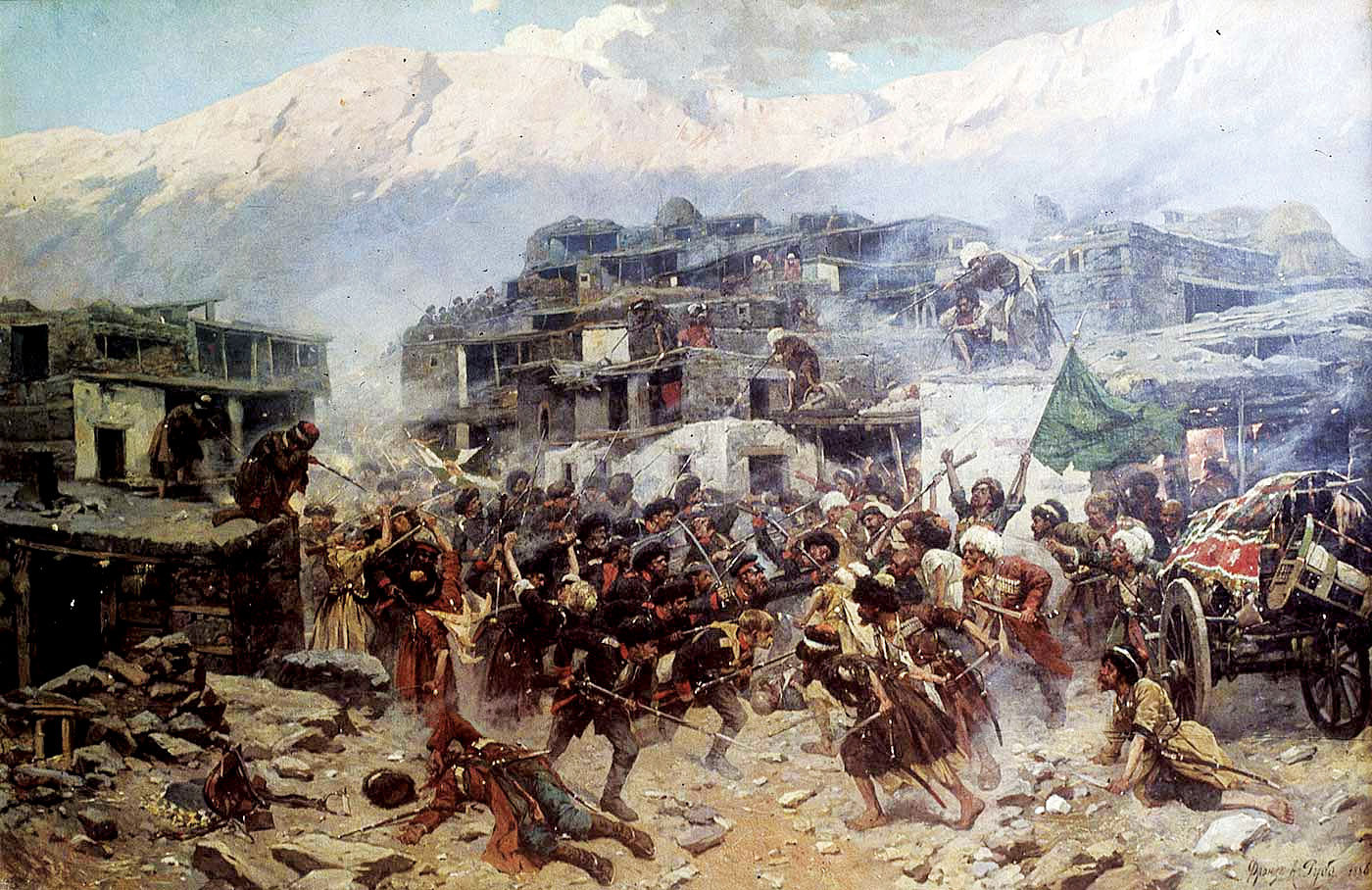
Caucasian tribesmen fight against the Cossacks, 1847

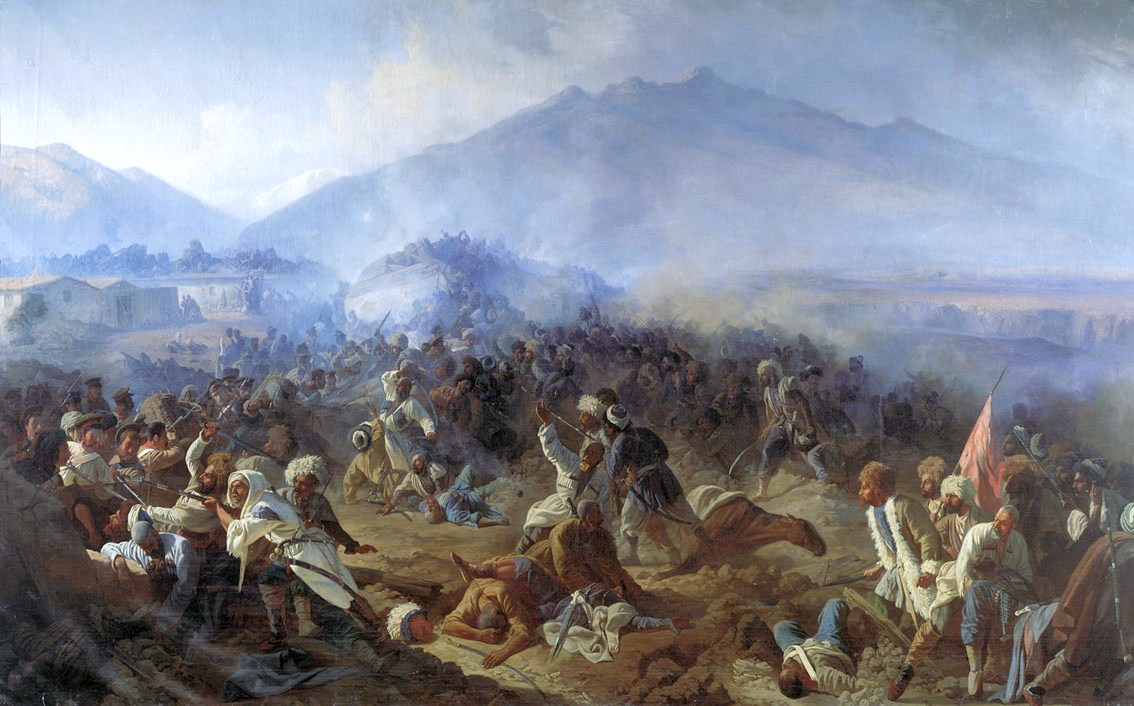
Storm of the fortress of Akhty in 1848

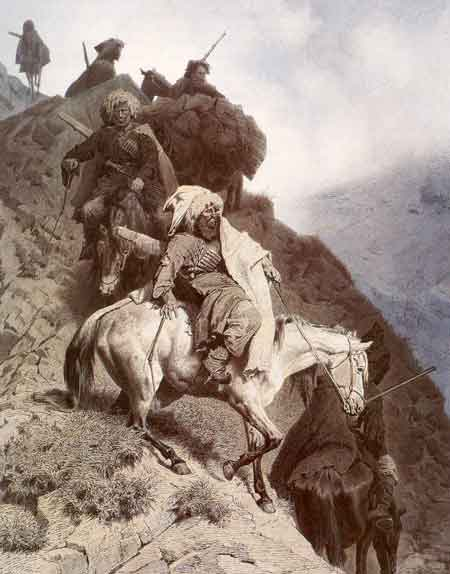
Circassians by Theodor Horschelt

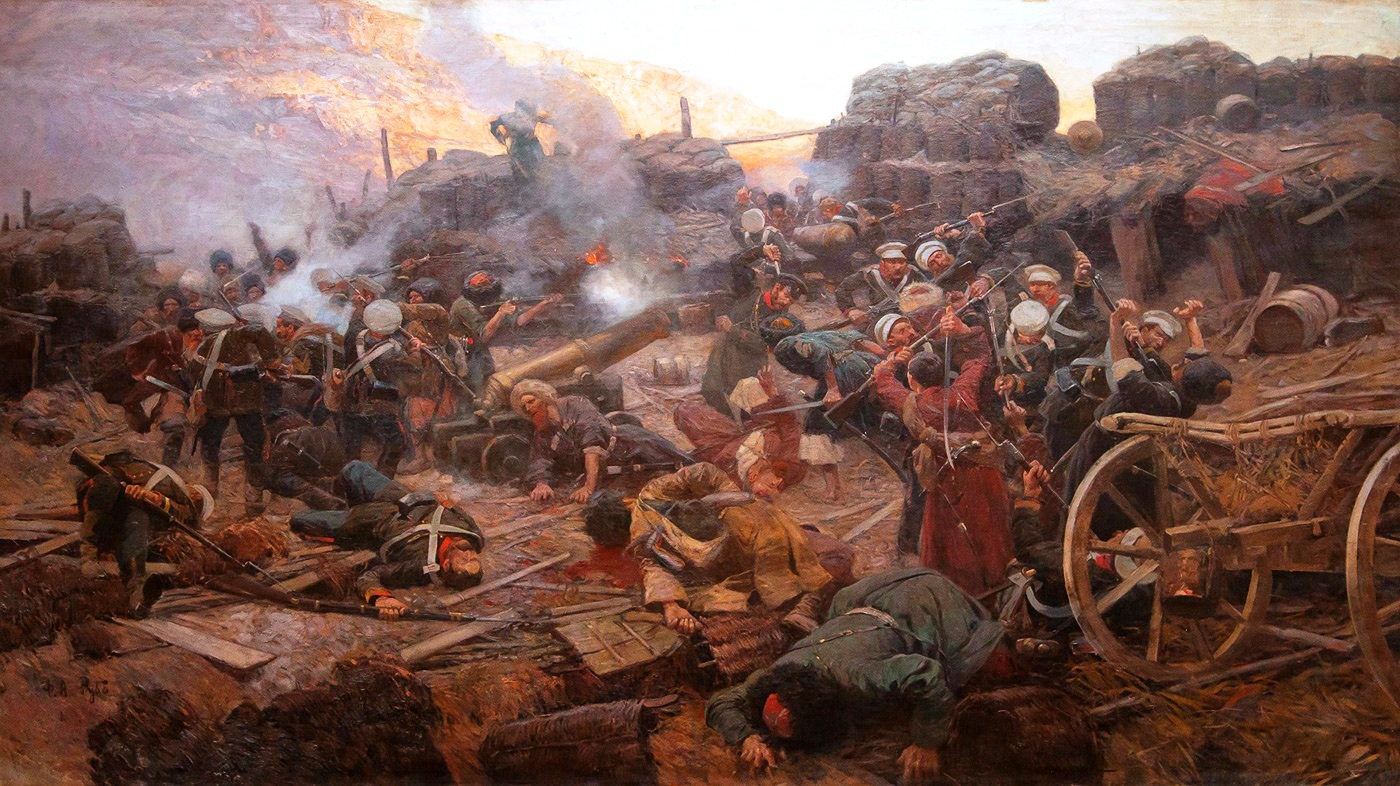
Battle in the mountains, by Franz Roubaud, 1890.

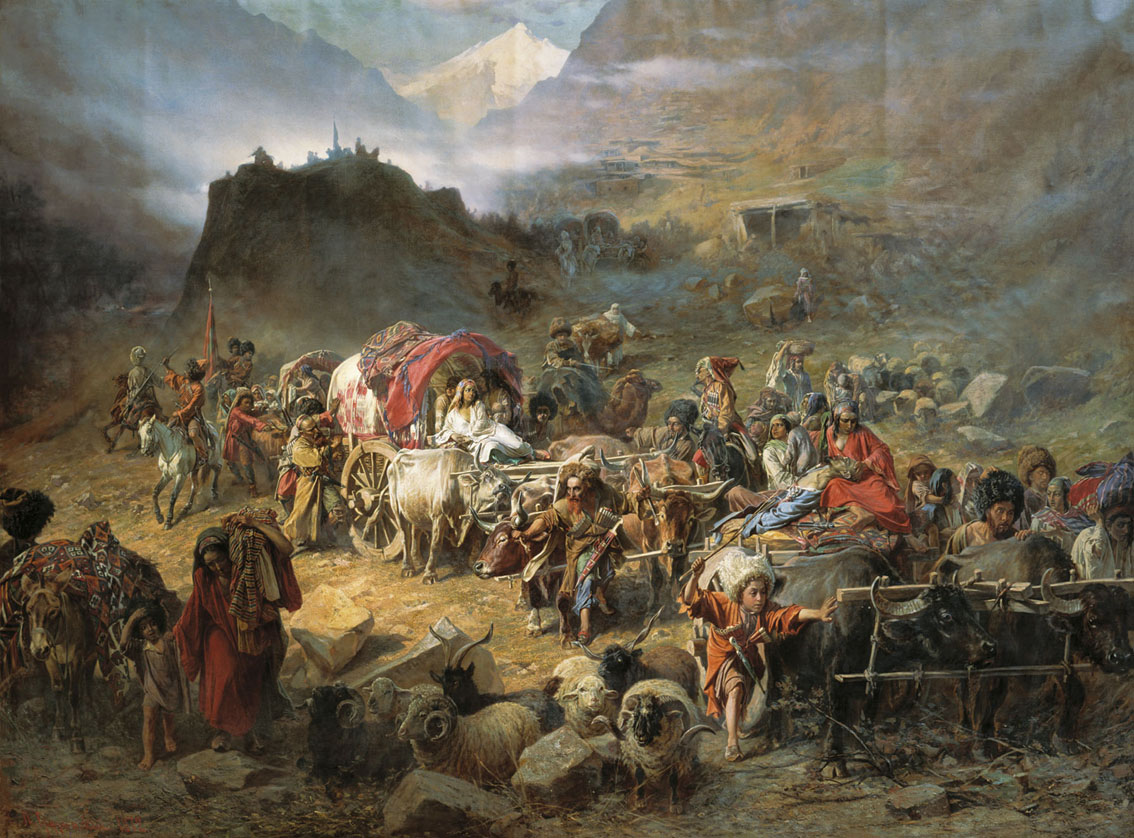
Mountaineers leave the aul, by Pyotr Gruzinsky

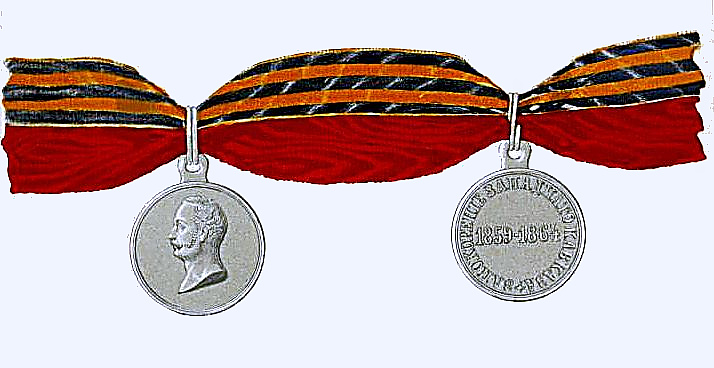
Russian medal for subjugation of Western Caucasus 1859–1864

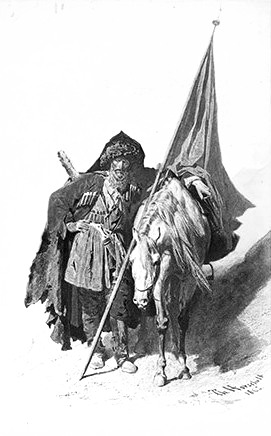
Murid with the naib banner, by Theodor Horschelt 1858–1861.

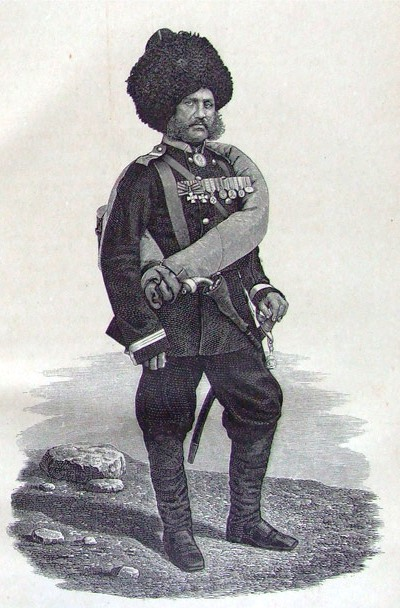
Officer of the Separate Caucasian сorps by A. L. Zisserman

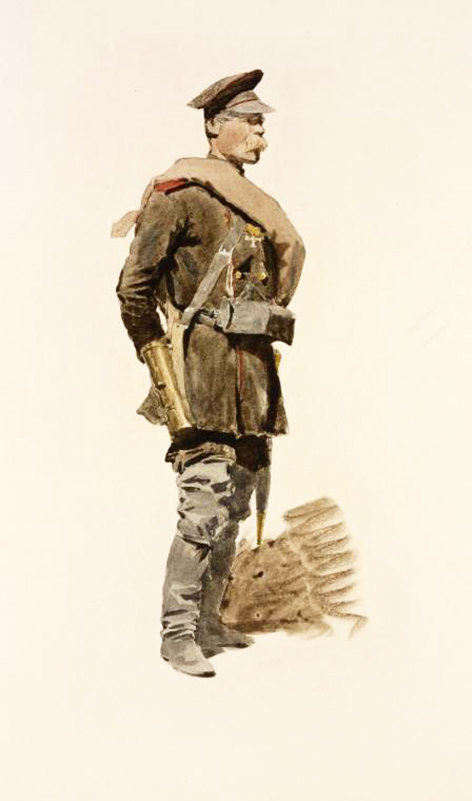
Artillery fireworker of the Separate Caucasian сorps

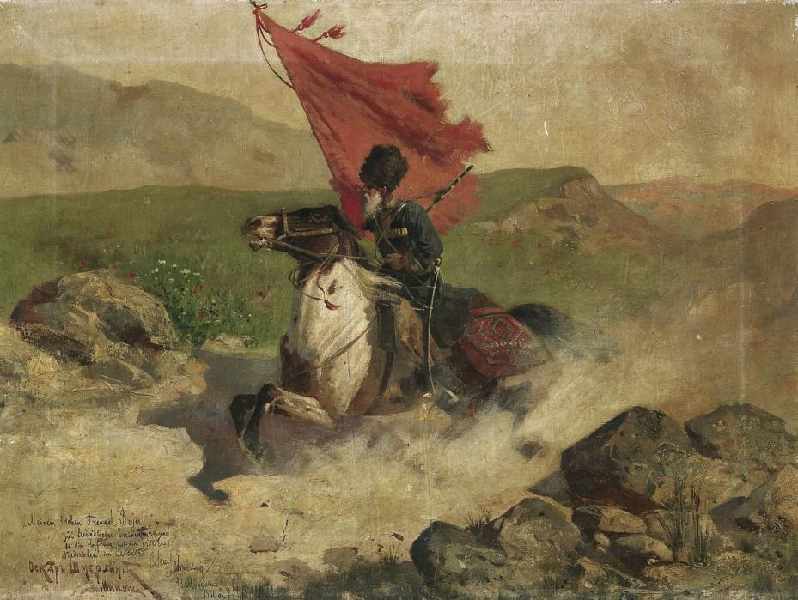
Caucasian horseman warrior, by Oskar Schmerling 1893.

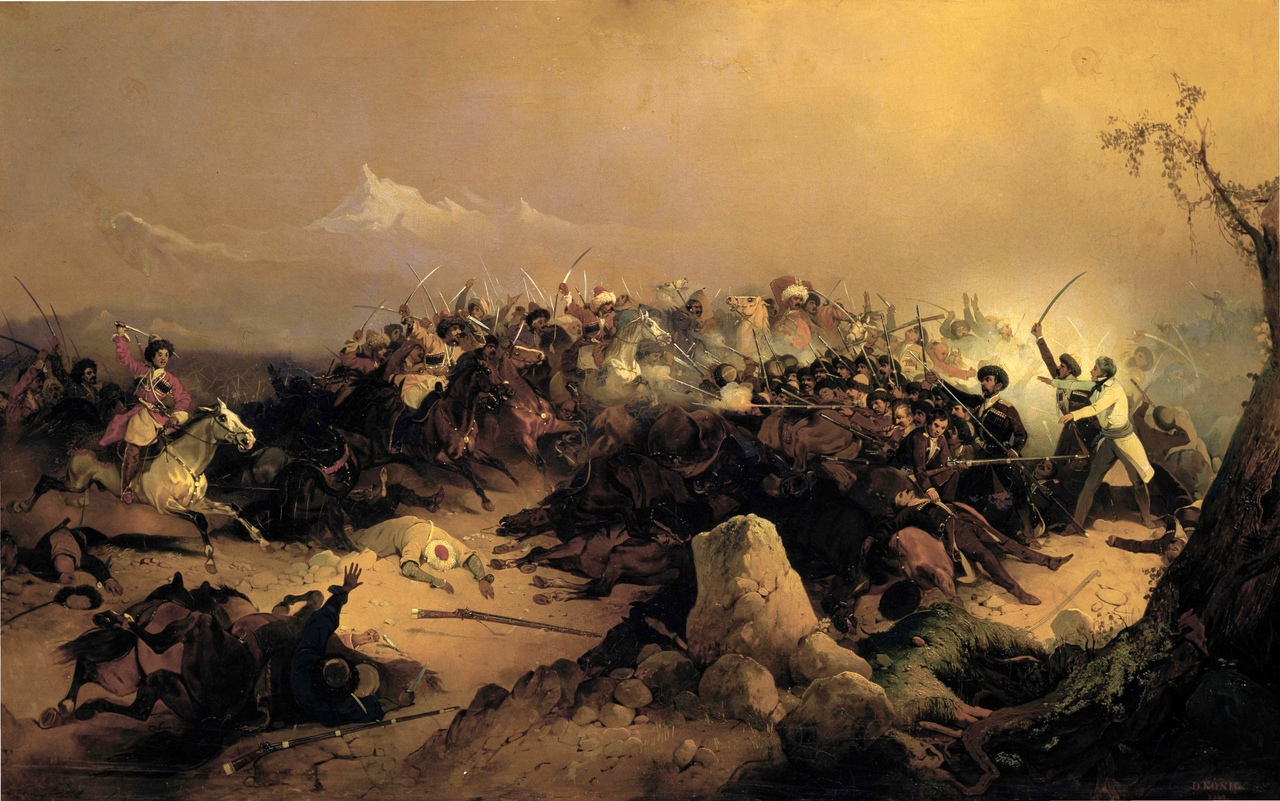
Fight with the сhechens under Akbulat-Urt, by D. Koenig (1849)

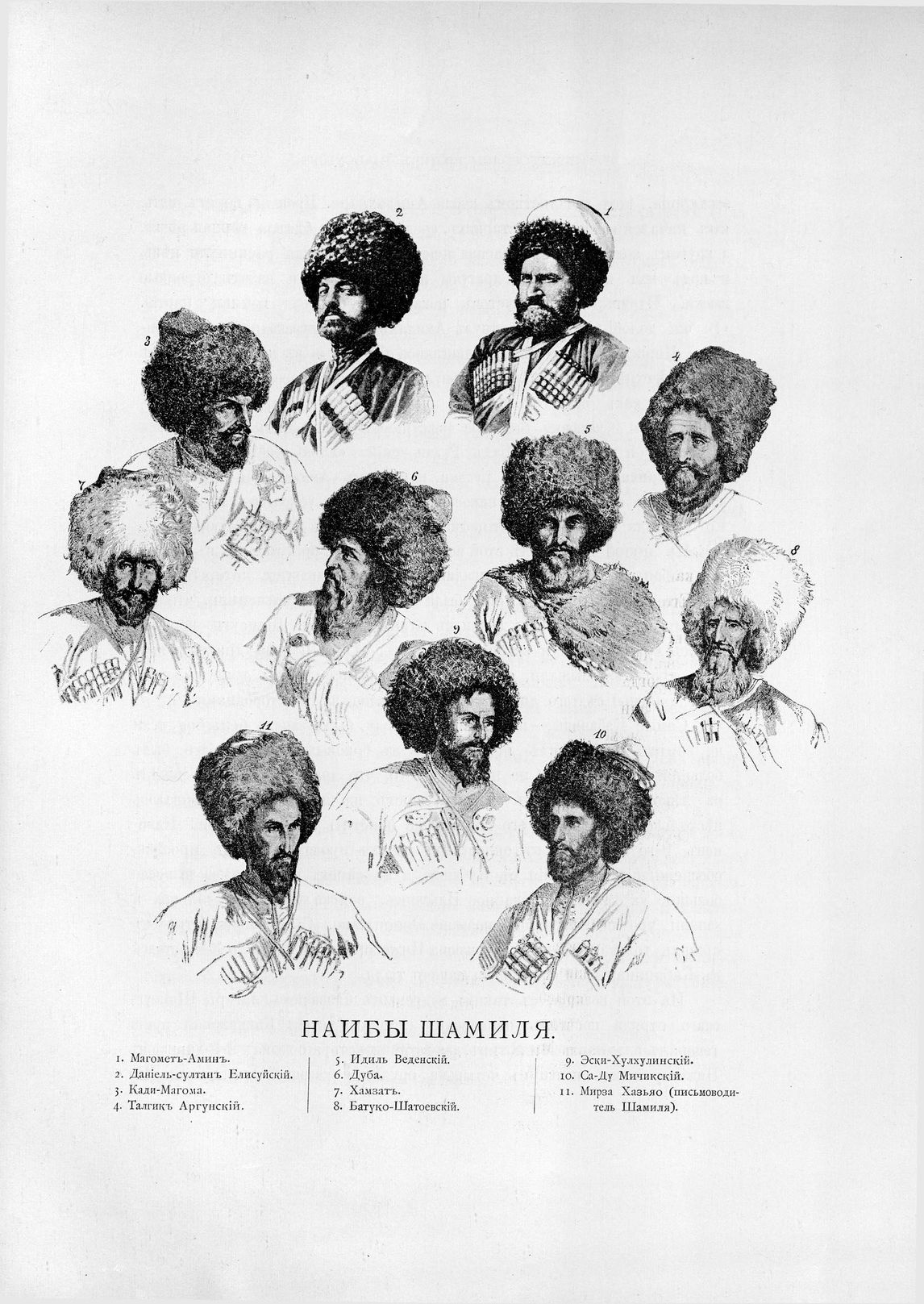
Naibs of Imam Shamil, by Giorgio Corradini 19th century.

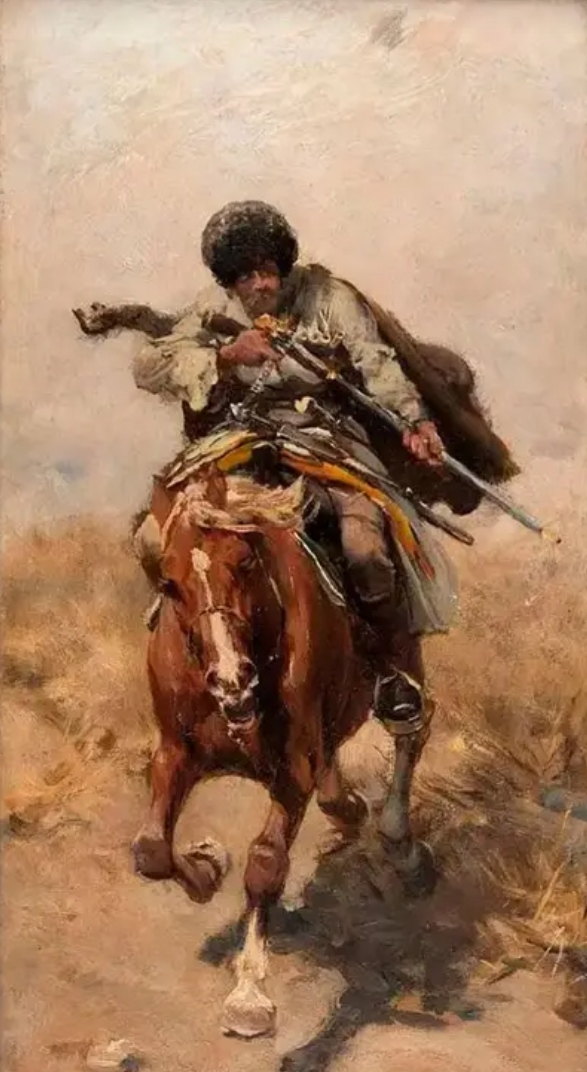
Circassian warrior, by Alfred Kowalski, 1895.

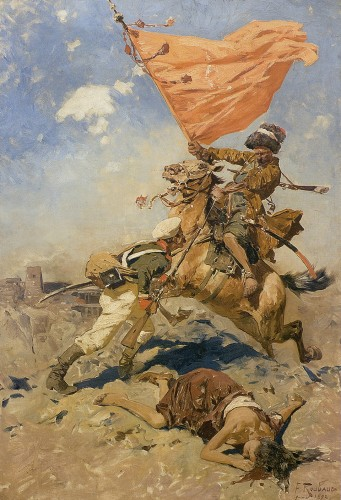
Caucasian rider in fight with Russian soldier, by Roubaud. F. (1892)

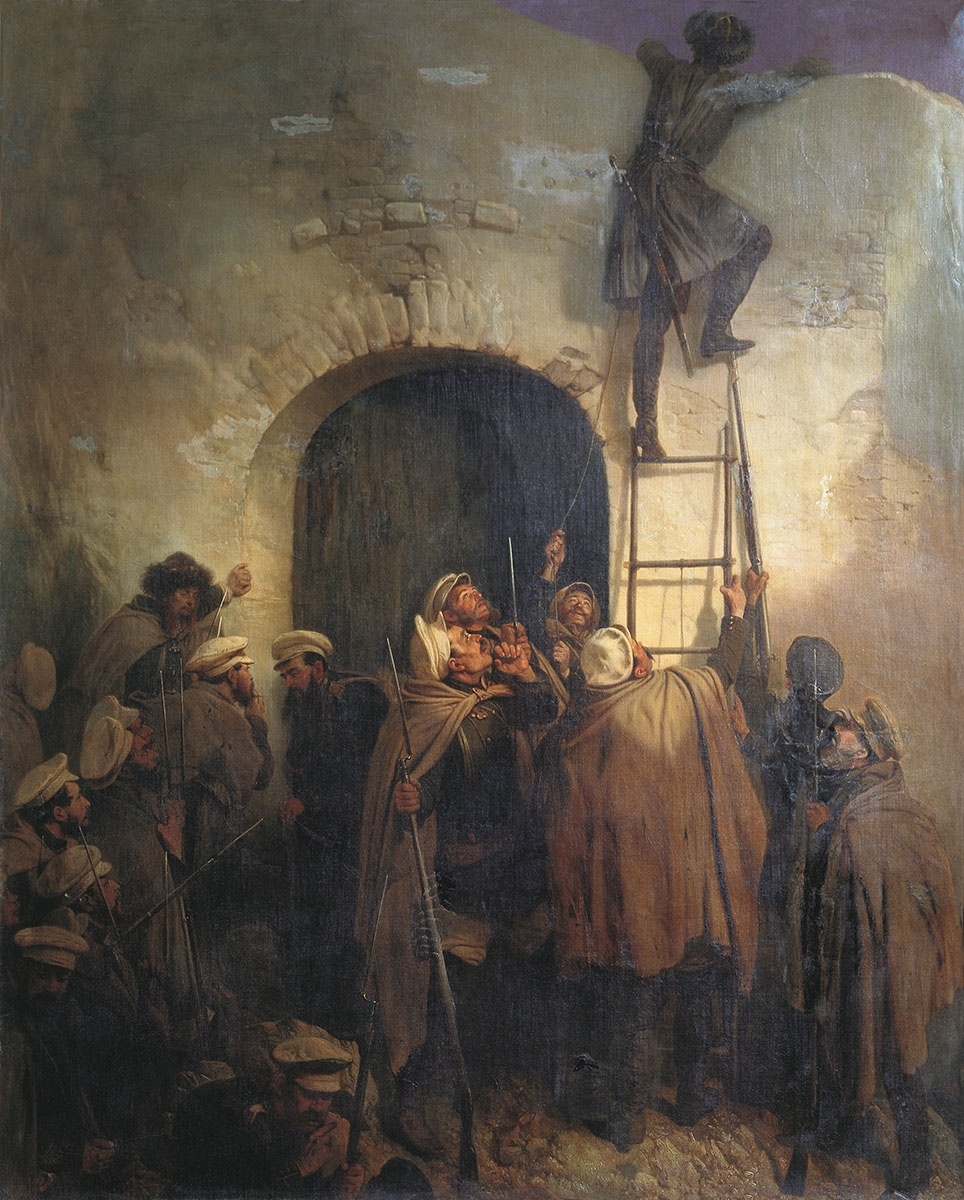
Soldiers of the Shirvan regiment on Gunib, by Bogdan Willewalde (1870).

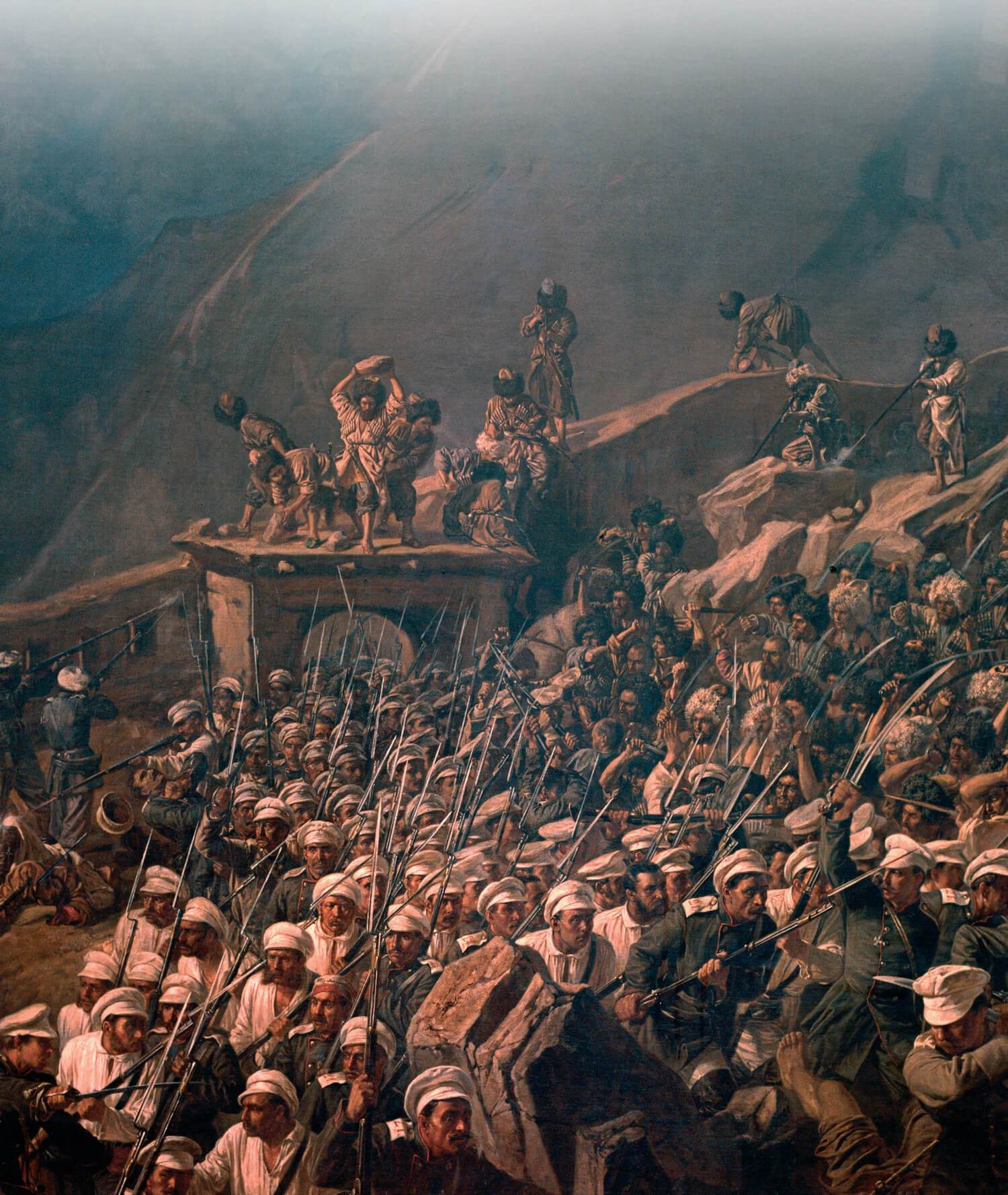
Assault of Gunib, by Pyotr Gruzinsky 1862.

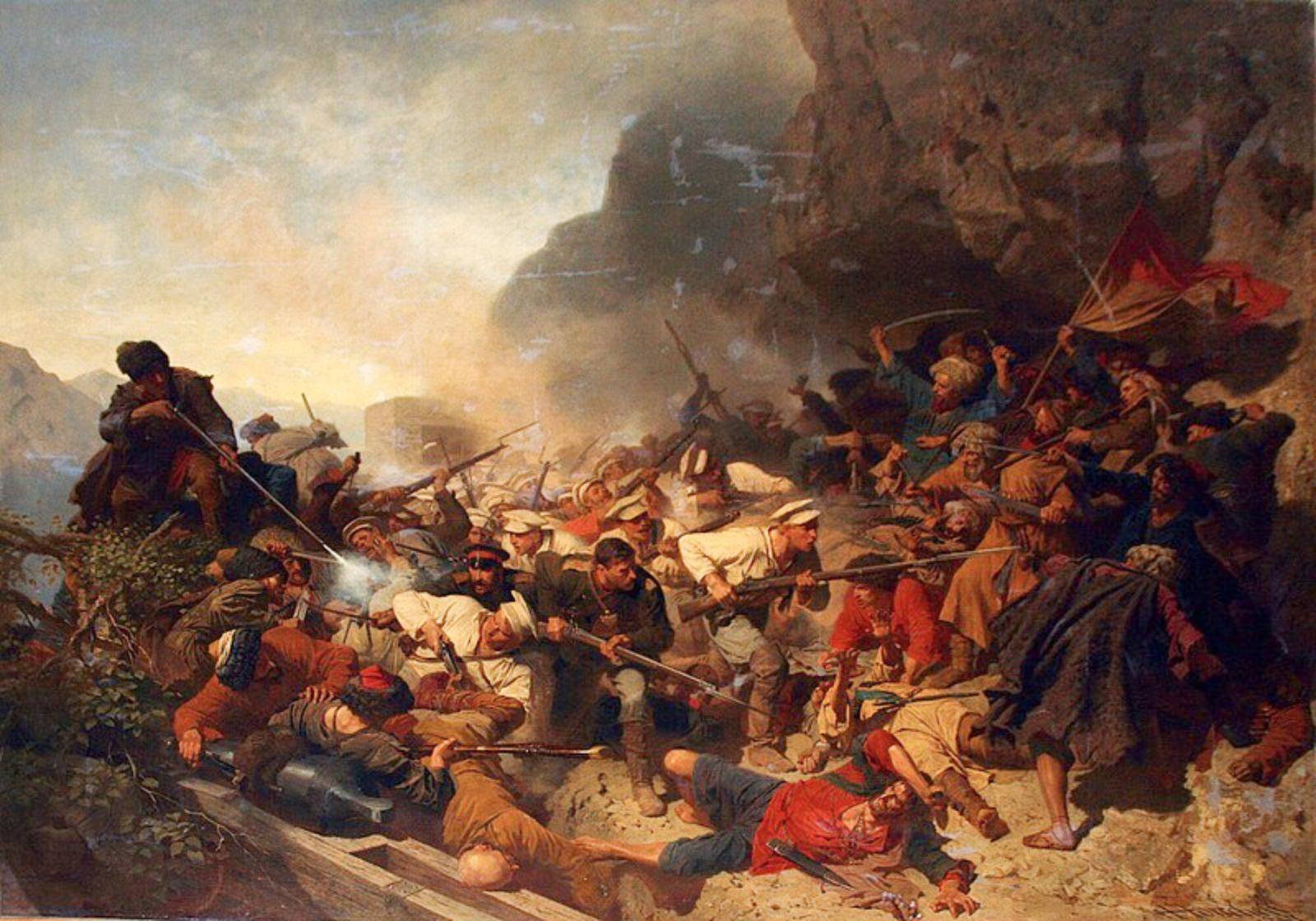
Battle of Ghunib, painting by Theodor Horschelt 1867.

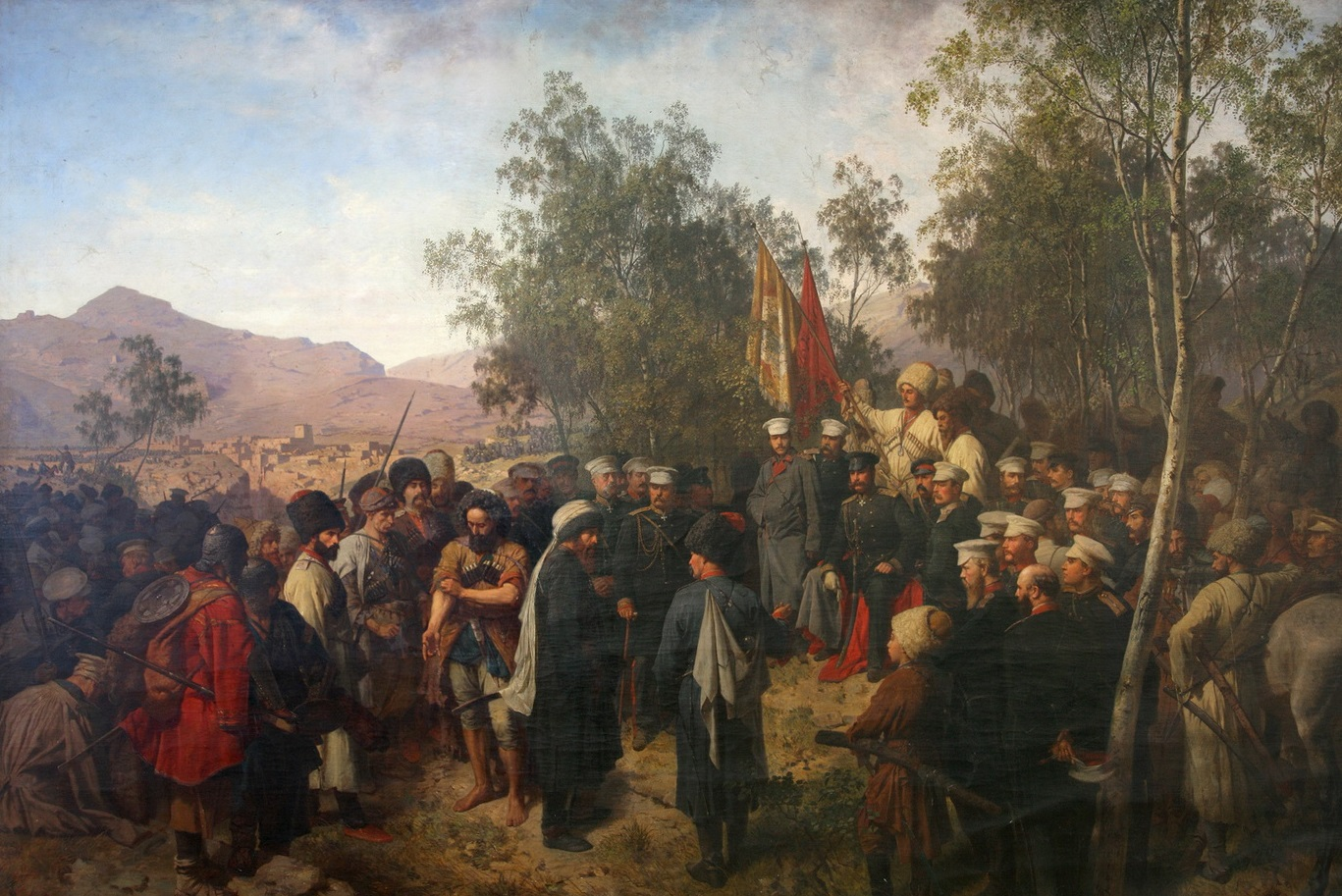
Capture of Shamil, painting by Theodor Horschelt 1859.

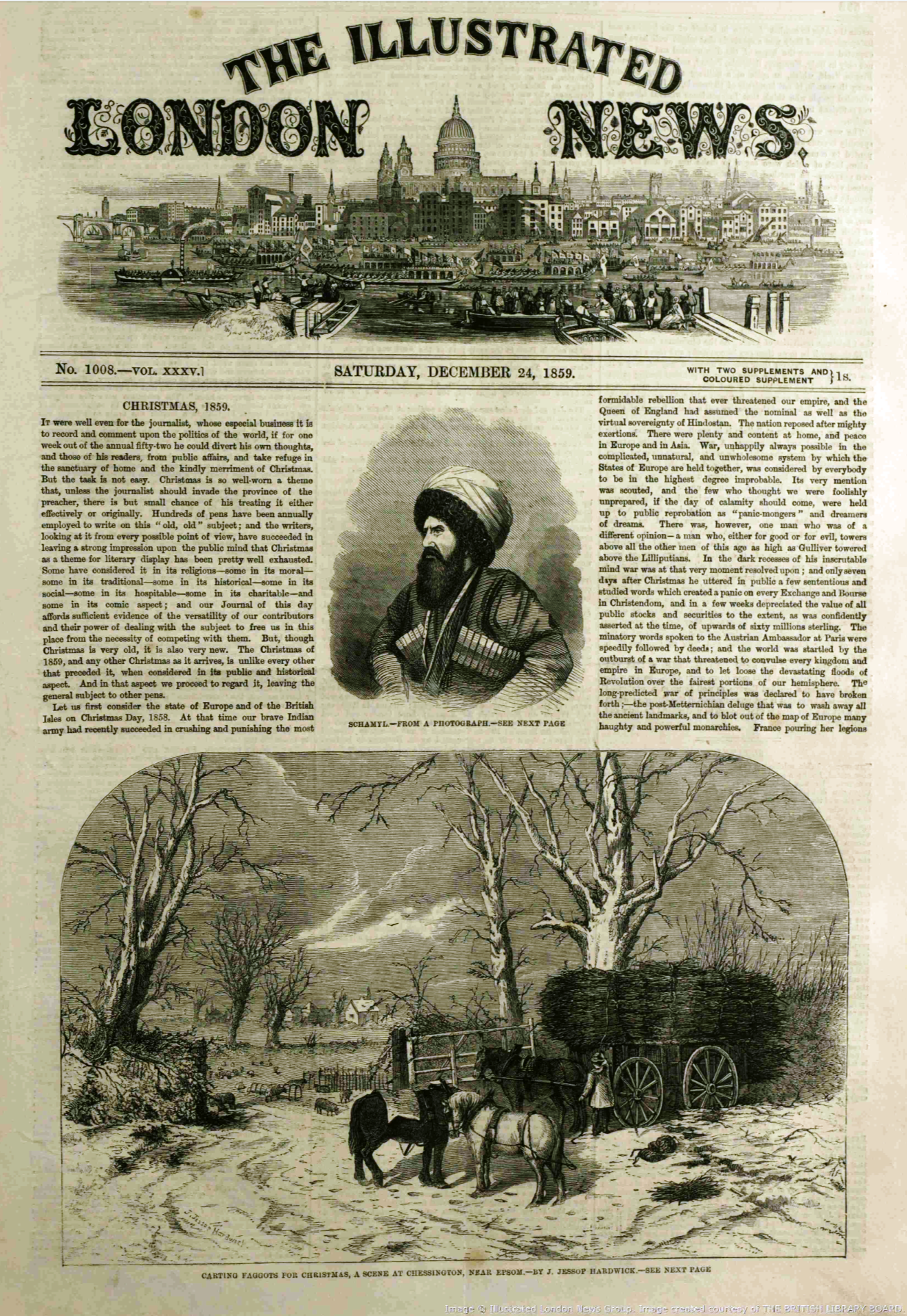
Shamil (front page). Illustrated London News of December 24, 1859.

Article of Illustrated London News about Russo-Circassian War.

== See also ==
- Russian conquest of Chechnya and Dagestan
- Russo-Circassian War

== Bibliography ==
- Krugov, Alexei; Nechitailov, Maxim (2016). Вооруженные силы иммамата горцев Северного Кавказа (1829-1859 гг.) [Armed forces of the Immamat of the Highlanders of the North Caucasus, 1829-1859]. Military Affairs (in Russian). Moscow: Russian Knights. ISBN 978-5-9906037-3-8.
- Bushuyev, S. (1941). К биографии Шамиля [To the biography of Shamil]. Red Archive (in Russian). 2 (102). Moscow: Gospolitizdat: 115–139.
- Народно-освободительное движение горцев Дагестана и Чечни в 20-50-х годах XIX в: Всесоюзная научная конференция, 20–22 июня 1989 г.: тезисы докладов и сообщений [The people's liberation movement of the highlanders of Dagestan and Chechnya in the 1820s–1850s: All-Union Scientific Conference, June 20–22, 1989: abstracts of reports and messages]. Makhachkala: Academy of Sciences of the Soviet Union, Dagestan ASSR. 1989. pp. 1–190.
- Kaziev, Sh. M., ed. (1997). Шамиль: Иллюстрированная энциклопедия [Shamil: Illustrated Encyclopedia] (in Russian). Moscow: Echo of the Caucasus. pp. 1–220. ISBN 5-900054-01-2.
- Dadaev, Yu. U. (2006). Государство Шамиля: социально-экономическое положение, политико-правовая и военно-административная система управления [State of Shamil: socio-economic situation, political-legal and military-administrative system of government] (PDF) (in Russian). Makhachkala: Ikhlas. pp. 1–491.
- Baddeley, John F. (1908). The Russian Conquest of the Caucasus. London: Longmans, Green and Co.
- Pokrovsky N. I. Caucasian Wars and the Imamate of Shamil / Foreword. N. N. Pokrovsky, introduction. and approx. V. G. Gadzhiev. — M.: ROSSPEN, 2000. — 511 p. — ISBN 5-8243-0078-X.
- Bell, J.S Journal of a residence in Circassia during the years 1837, 1838, and 1839 (English)
- Dubrovin, N. (1886–88), История войны и владычества русских на Кавказе [The history of the war and Russian rule in the Caucasus, volumes 4–6], Saint Petersburg
- Kaziev, Shapi. Imam Shamil, Molodaya Gvardiya publishers: Moscow, 2001, 2003, 2006, 2010
- Kaziev, Shapi. Akhoulgo. Caucasian War of 19th century.
- The historical novel Epoch Publishing house. Makhachkala, 2008. ISBN 978-5-98390-047-9
- Gammer, Moshe. Muslim Resistance to the Tsar: Shamil and the Conquest of Chechnia and Daghestan. Frank Cass & Co. Ltd., 1994. 247 p. — ISBN 978-0714634319.
- Gisetti, Anton L. (1901). Потери в период Кавказско-горской войны 1801–864 [Losses during the Caucasian-Mountain War of 1801–1864]. In Potto, Vasily A. (ed.). Сборник сведений о потерях Кавказских войск во время войн Кавказско-горской, персидских, турецких и в Закаспийском крае [Collection of information about the losses of the Caucasian troops during the wars with the Highlanders, Persians and Turks and in the Transcaspian region] (in Russian). Compiled according to documents kept in the Caucasian Archives. Tiflis (modern Tbilisi): Lieberman.
- Uralanis, Boris (1960). Войны и народонаселение Европы: людские потери вооруженных сил Европейских стран в XVII–XX веках [Wars and the population of Europe: human losses of the armed forces of European countries in the 18th–20th centuries] (in Russian). Moscow: Social and economic literature.
- Vedeneev, Dmitry (2000). 77 тысяч [77 thousands]. Rodina (in Russian). Moscow.
- Krivosheev, Grigori (2001). Вооруженные конфликты на Северном Кавказе [Armed conflicts in the North Caucasus]. Россия и СССР в войнах 20 столетия [Russia and USSR in war of 20 century] (in Russian). Moscow: Alma-Press.
- Clodfelter, M. (2017). Warfare and Armed Conflicts: A Statistical Encyclopedia of Casualty and Other Figures, 1492–2015 (4th ed.). Jefferson, North Carolina: McFarland. ISBN 978-0786474707.
