= Pavel Grabbe =

Russian count and military officer (1789–1875)

Pavel Khristoforovich Grabbe
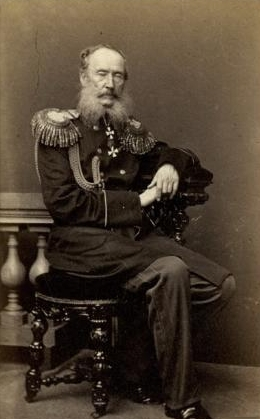
- Born: December 2, 1789; Kexholm, Vyborg Governorate, Russian Empire
- Died: July 15, 1875 (aged 85); Grabschina, Poltava Governorate, Russian Empire
- Military career
- Allegiance: Russia
- Conflicts: Napoleonic Wars; Caucasian War; Russo-Circassian War; November Uprising; Russo-Turkish War
- Awards: Order of St. George; Order of Saint Alexander Nevsky; Order of St. Andrew; Golden Weapon for Bravery; Order of Saint Anna; Order of the White Eagle; Order of Saint Vladimir

Count Pavel Khristoforovich Grabbe (December 2, 1789 – July 15, 1875) was a Russian cavalry general who led Russian armies in the Caucasus.
