= Aleksandr Miklashevsky =

19th-century Russian Imperial army commander

- Nickname: Black Colonel
- Born: 1796; Ponurovka, Starodubsky Uyezd, Little Russia Governorate, Russian Empire
- Died: December 13, 1831 (aged 34–35) Agachkala, Caucasian Imamate
- Cause of death: Shooting
- Buried: Shusha, Shusha uezd
- Branch: Infantry
- Rank: Colonel
- Commands: 22nd Jäger Regiment
- Conflicts: Russo-Persian War (1826–1828); Russo-Turkish War (1828–1829); Caucasian War

Aleksandr Mikhailovich Miklashevsky (Russian: Алекса́ндр Миха́йлович Миклаше́вский, Ukrainian: Олекса́ндр Миха́йлович Миклаше́вський; 1796 – 1831) was a colonel in the Imperial Russian Army and a Decembrist of Ukrainian ethnicity.

== Early life ==
Miklashevsky was born in 1796 in the village of Ponurovka, Starodubsky Uyezd, Little Russia Governorate. He was of noble descent, born to senator Mikhail Miklashevsky (1756–1847) and Anastasia Yakovlevna (née Bakurinskaya). Being eldest son, he had 4 younger brothers and 4 younger sisters.

== Career ==
Miklashevsky was enrolled as a page in the Page Corps on 25 December 1810. From 28 April 1813, he held the rank of chamber page. On 26 March 1816, he was commissioned as an ensign in the Izmailovsky Life Guards Regiment. Promoted to second lieutenant on 4 June 1817 and to lieutenant on 27 February 1819. On 12 October 1821, appointed adjutant to Major General Martin Harting. Promoted to staff captain on 26 January 1822, and to captain on 13 March 1823. On 22 October 1824, transferred to the 22nd Jäger Regiment.

From February to April 1821, Miklashevsky was a member of the secret society of officers (Union of Prosperity) in the Izmailovsky Regiment and, from that same year, likely a member of the Northern Society. Following the suppression of the Chernigov Regiment uprising on 3 January 1826, an arrest order was issued for him the same day. He was arrested on 10 January at his father's estate in the village of Berezovka and taken to Chernigov, then on 17 January to the main guardhouse in Saint Petersburg. On 18 January, he was transferred to the Peter and Paul Fortress with the instruction to "detain at discretion, but treat well" in a cell of the Trubetskoy Bastion.

On 15 June 1826, it was ordered by imperial decree that Miklashevsky be held for another month in the fortress, then returned to service in the Separate Caucasian Corps with monthly reports on his conduct. On 7 July, he was reassigned to the 42nd Jäger Regiment in Karabakh. He took part in the Russo-Persian (1826–1828) and Russo-Turkish (1828–1829) wars with that regiment. For distinction during the storming of Kars on 23 June 1828, he was promoted to colonel on 16 October that year. On 17 March 1829, he assumed command of the 42nd Jäger Regiment. According to Rzagulu bey Vazirov (son of Mirza Jamal Javanshir) and Gasim bey Zakir saved his life during operations in Jar in Caucasian War.

== Death ==
Miklashevsky was killed during the assault on the Agachkala fortification against the forces of Ghazi Muhammad in Dagestan on 13 December [O.S. 1 December] 1831. Adjutant General Nikita Pankratiev wrote of Miklashevsky as "bravest staff officer, charging on horseback to the battle site" who "was wounded in the arm by a bullet. Then, dismounting, he rushed toward the fortification at the head of the brave jägers, but a fatal bullet struck him down" in a report dated 16 December [O.S. 4 December] 1831 to the commander of the Separate Caucasian Corps, Georg Andreas von Rosen.

He was buried in Shusha according to his will.

== Sources ==
- Mammadova, Dilara (1985). Гасым бәј Закир: Мәгаләләр мәҹмуәси [Gasim bey Zakir: Collection of Articles] (in Azerbaijani). Elm.
- Kərimov, Raqub (2017). Qasım bəy Zakir: həyatı, dövrü, mühiti və müasirləri [Gasim bey Zakir: his life, period, environment and contemporaries] (PDF) (Doctoral Thesis) (in Azerbaijani). Baku: Azerbaijan National Academy of Sciences.
