= 1788 in Russia =

Events from the year 1788 in Russia

== Incumbents ==
- Monarch – Catherine II

== Events ==
- Russo-Swedish War (1788–1790) begins
  - Battle of Hogland
- Russo-Turkish War (1787–1792) continues
  - Siege of Khotin (1788)
  - Siege of Ochakov (1788)
  - Naval actions at the siege of Ochakov (1788)
  - Battle of Fidonisi
- Fruntimmersskolan i Viborg founded
- Kremlin Senate building completed
- Orenburg Muslim Spiritual Assembly established
- Ulyoty town founded

== Births ==
- Alexander Albrecht (general), cavalry commander
- Yekaterina Avdeyeva, writer
- Auguste-Joseph Desarnod, French engraver and battle painter who spent most of his life in Russia
- Duke Eugen of Württemberg (1788–1857), German aristocratic exile and Russian general
- Maria Ikonina, ballerina. (d. 1866)
- Pavel Kiselyov, general, statesman, and reformer
- Sergey Stepanovich Lanskoy, Minister of the Interior 1855–1861, reformer
- Mikhail Lazarev, explorer and admiral
- Nikita Pankratiev, general
- Catherine Pavlovna of Russia, fourth daughter of Paul I of Russia
- Louis-Victor-Léon de Rochechouart, French aristocratic exile and Russian general
- Mikhail Vielgorsky, Russian official, composer, and arts patron
- Sergey Volkonsky, general and Decembrist
- Karl Friedrich von Rennenkampff, Baltic German general
- Semyon Yanovsky, Russian naval officer, the third governor of Russian America

== Deaths ==
- Samuel Greig, Scottish sailor who became a Russian admiral
- Maria Rumyantseva, courtier (born 1699)
- Pyotr Sheremetev, wealthy nobleman and courtier
- Mikhail Volkonsky, general and statesman
