= Ibrahim Bey Azer =

- Born: 1836 Shusha, Russian Empire
- Died: 1885 (aged 48–49) Shusha, Shushinsky Uyezd, Russian Empire
- Occupation: Poet

Ibrahim-bek Azer (Azerbaijani: İbrahim bəy Azər; 1836-1885) was an Azerbaijani poet. He wrote under the pseudonym Azər.

== Life ==
Ibrahim bey Alibek oglu Azər (Fuladov) was born in 1836 in Shusha. He was the elder brother of Abdullah bey Asi, and the grandson of the poet Gasim bey Zakir. He grew up under the protection of Gasim bey Zakir. Gasim bey Zakir is a descendant of Karabakh khans. He received his primary education from a local mullah, then continued his studies at a madrasah. He was fluent in Persian and Russian. He began his service career in a Madrasa, then rose to the rank of an office worker of the II category, worked as a police officer, and received the rank of provincial secretary.

He wrote poems under the pseudonym Azər. He was a member of the “Mejlisi-faramushan” (“Society of the Forgotten”) circle organized by Mir Mohsun Navvab. Ibrahim bey Azer wrote poetry in the classical style in Azerbaijani and Persian. Most of his work has not survived. For the first time, several of his ghazals were published in the collections of Firidun bey Kocharli "Azerbaijani Literature" (1981) and "Poetic Collections" (1987).

The poet died in 1885 in Shusha.

== See also ==
- Memo bey Memayi
