= Agalarov =

Agalarov (Russian: Агаларов, Azerbaijani: Ağalarov) is a surname. Notable people with the surname include:

- Aras Agalarov (born 1955), Azerbaijani-born Russian businessman
- Emin Agalarov (born 1979), Azerbaijani singer-songwriter
- Gamid Agalarov (born 2000), Russian football player
- Hasan bey Agalarov (born 1812), lieutenant general in the Russian military
- Kamil Agalarov (born 1988), Russian footballer
- Ruslan Agalarov (born 1974), Russian footballer and manager
