= Gravestone of Mir Mohsun Navvab =

- Azerbaijani: Mir Möhsün Nəvvabın qəbirüstü abidəsi
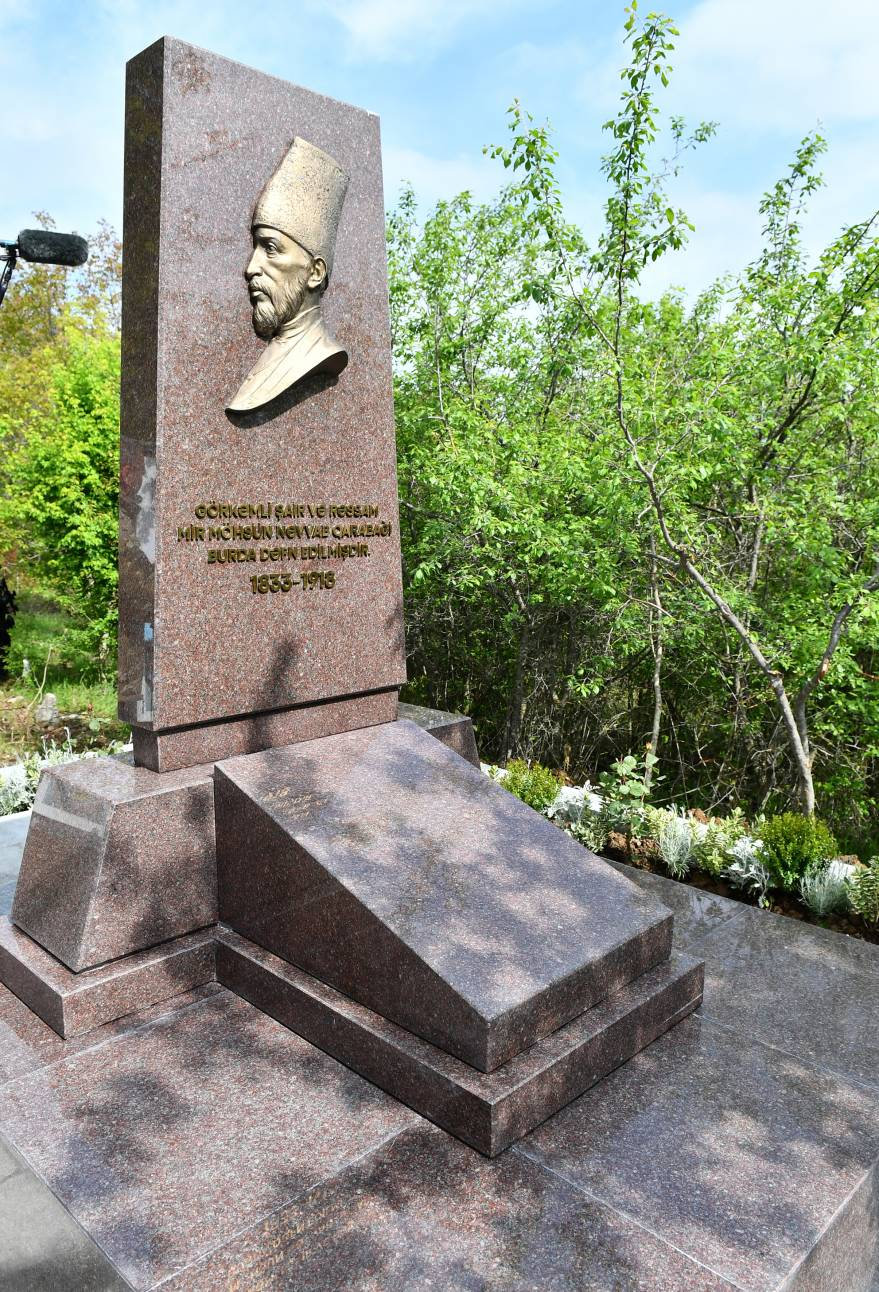
- Interactive map of Gravestone of Mir Mohsun Navvab
- Location: Jidir Plain, Shusha, Azerbaijan
- Designer: Tokay Mammadov
- Type: gravestone
- Completion date: 1957
- Dismantled date: after 1992

The Gravestone of Mir Mohsun Navvab (Azerbaijani: Mir Möhsün Nəvvabın qəbirüstü abidəsi) is a monumental memorial of a republican significance located in the city of Shusha and belonging to the Shusha State Architectural Reserve. In 1960, reconstruction works were carried out on the grave of Mir Mohsun Navvab through the means of UNESCO. The tombstone was registered as a historical and cultural monument of the country significance by the Ministry of Culture and Tourism of the Republic of Azerbaijan. After the occupation of the city of Shusha in 1992, it was destroyed by the Armenian armed forces.

== History ==
Mir Mohsun Navvab, an Azerbaijani scientist, poet, artist, astronomer, literary critic, calligrapher, historian and musicologist, lived and worked in Shusha, dying in 1919. On the grave of Navvab, his son Mir Ibrahim Aghamirzade had carved an inscription:

The great Navvab left this world. He was a connoisseur and a prominent personality of his era. A descendant of a holy family, a pure follower of the prophet, he wrote many books, leaving a memory of himself. May he rest in peace at all times. Navvab passed away on the 29th day of the month of Rabiul-Awwal, 1919.

In 1957, a bas-relief monument of red marble was made on the grave of Navvab by the authors: the sculptor Tokay Mammadov and the architect Rasim Abdurrakhmanov. In 1960, under the auspices of UNESCO, reconstruction works were carried out on the tombstone. After the occupation of Shusha on 9 May 1992, the gravestone was destroyed by the Armenian Armed Forces.

After the liberation of Shusha on 7 November 2020, the remains of the gravestone were discovered by the Azerbaijani Armed Forces.

== See also ==
- Mir Mohsun Navvab
