= Battle of Atly-Boyun =

- Part of the Murid War and the Shamkhal Uprising
Date	20 May, 1831
Location	Atly-Boyun, Dagestan
Result	North Caucasian victory

Belligerents
(Russia) Russian Empire	Shamkhalate of Tarki; Caucasian Imamate

Commanders and leaders
(Russia) Maxim Maximovich Taube	(Caucasian Imamate) Ghazi Muhammad Irazi-bek Kazanishensky

Strength
Over 1,000 troops	Around 2,000

Casualties and losses
Unknown	Unknown

The Battle of Atly-Boyun was fought on 20 May 1831 during the Caucasian War between Russian forces and a coalition of Dagestani rebels from the North Caucasian Imamate and the Tarki Shamkhalate. It ended in a significant victory for the rebels and marked an important moment in the early military career of Imam Ghazi Muhammad.

== Background ==
Imam Ghazi Muhammad had been actively spreading the doctrines of muridism throughout Dagestan and Chechnya since the 1820s. His growing influence led to the formation of a devoted corps of ascetic disciples known as shikhs. His message found strong support among the Kumyks of the Tarki Shamkhalate. According to N. Dubrovnin, the Kumyks became the first nucleus of Ghazi Muhammad’s armed forces.

Following an earlier failure near Khunzakh, Ghazi Muhammad moved operations to the plains and settled in Aghach-kala. When the exiled Kumyk noble Irazi-bek Kazanishensky joined him, several major villages in the Shamkhalate revolted and pledged allegiance to the Imamate. By the time their combined forces reached the village of Atly-Boyun, their numbers had grown to approximately 2,000 fighters.

== The Battle ==
Major General Maxim Maximovich Taube led over 1,000 Russian troops toward Atly-Boyun, including the Butyrsky Infantry Regiment, four artillery guns, and Cossack detachments. A second detachment under Lieutenant Colonel von Disterlo (Kurinsky Regiment) was supposed to launch a simultaneous attack, but did not arrive in time.

Russian forces advanced through a narrow gorge and encountered multiple barricades. The rebels had occupied the surrounding slopes, delivering heavy fire on the advancing troops. A local militia expected to aid the Russians defected to the rebels during the battle.

Despite initial progress past one barricade, Russian forces came under crossfire from two more and suffered significant losses. Taube eventually ordered a retreat and regrouped at the Shamkhal mills, seven versts from the battlefield.

== Aftermath ==
The defeat at Atly-Boyun was a major setback for Russian forces. It not only boosted the military prestige of Ghazi Muhammad but also expanded support for muridism across the North Caucasus. The Russian failure opened the path for rebel forces toward the fortress of Burnaya, near the capital of the Shamkhalate.

== See also ==
- Caucasian War
- Ghazi Muhammad
- Tarki Shamkhalate
- History of the Kumyks

== Sources ==
- Baddeley, J. F. The Russian Conquest of the Caucasus. 1908.
- "Chronicle of Muhammad-Tahir al-Karahi", DGU Press, Makhachkala, 2010.
