= Hasan bey Agalarov =

- Həsən bəy Ağalarov
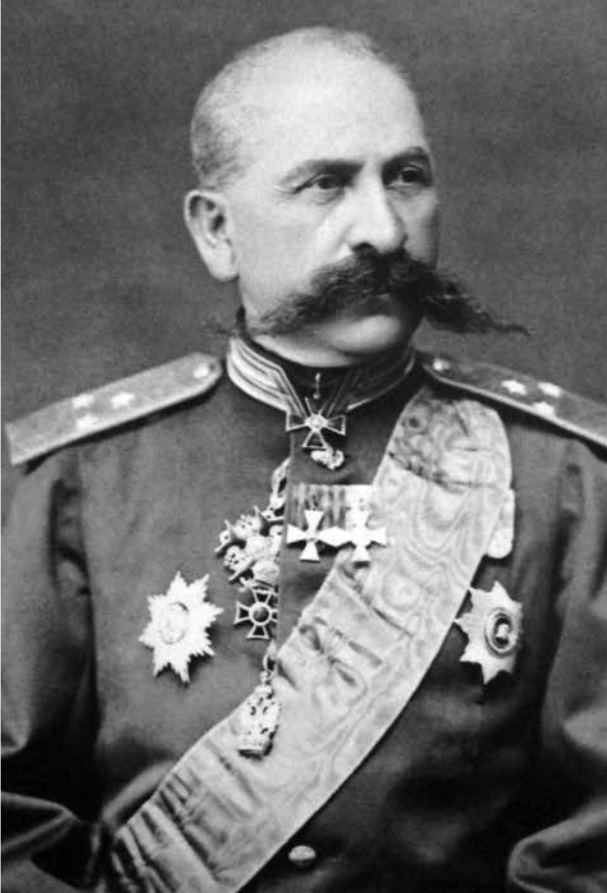
- Born: 1812; Tbilisi, Russian Empire
- Died: 1883; Tbilisi, Russian Empire
- Military career
- Allegiance: Russian Empire
- Branch: Imperial Russian Army
- Service years: 1830 – 1881
- Rank: Lieutenant General
- Unit: Transcaucasian Equestrian Muslim Regiment
- Conflicts: Hungarian uprising Russo-Turkish War

Hasan bey Agalarov (Russian: Гасан-бек Агаларов) was a Russian military leader of Azerbaijani origin who reached the rank of lieutenant general in the Imperial Russian Army. He became the first Azerbaijani to be awarded the Order of St. George in the course of hostilities after he distinguished himself in the battle of Debrecen on 21 July 1849 during the suppression of the Hungarian uprising of 1848-1849).

== Military activities ==
Hasan bey Agalarov was born in 1812 in Tbilisi in a noble family. He received general education at the Tbilisi gymnasium. He enrolled in the military service in 1834, in the Transcaucasian Equestrian Muslim regiment. As part of the Transcaucasian Equestrian Muslim regiment he was sent to Warsaw in November 1834, along with his fellow Azerbaijanis staff captain Ismayil Bek Kutkashensky and Lieutenant Jafargulu Bakikhanov (Abbasgulu Bakikhanov's younger brother). Agalarov was promoted to praporschik on 8 October 1835 in Warsaw.

In 1840, Agalarov was awarded the Order of St. Stanislav of the 3rd rank for excellent service. In 1849 the Transcaucasian Equestrian Muslim regiment participated in the battles for Debrecen, crushed the Hungarian rebels during the suppression of the Hungarian uprising and captured four enemy cannons successfully. For this battle, the regiment was awarded the St. George flag. As for himself, as the assistant commander of the regiment, he was awarded the Order of St. George 4th class on 28 August 1849 (No. 8147 according to the list of Grigorovich – Stepanov's knight list).

According to Field-Marshal Ivan Paskevich "in the battle with the rebellious Hungarians at the city of Debrecen, on 21 July 1849, being with three hundred Transcaucasian Equestrian Muslim Regiment on the left flank, during the attack with special selflessness he rushed to the enemy infantry and completely destroyed it, and recaptured the first two guns and charging box; then, pursuing the enemy through the city, he took 300 prisoners and the entire convoy".

He was appointed commander of the Transcaucasian Equestrian Muslim regiment in 1852. On 17 April 1857 he was promoted to major general and transferred to the Separate Caucasian Corps. On 8 November 1877 he was promoted to Lieutenant General.

== Personal life ==
Agalarov was friends with many prominent Tbilisi aristocrats, among them - Generals Israfil bey Yadigarov, Ismayil Bek Kutkashensky, translator and adviser to the viceroy Aga bey Yadigarov, playwright Mirza Fatali Akhundov and poet Gasim bey Zakir, to whom the general helped when he was exiled.

He was married to Bike Agha, daughter of Ahmed Khan Javanshir (son of Ibrahim Khalil Khan of Karabakh). Together they had a son, Davud-agha and a daughter, Maria Khanum. His death date is unknown.

== Orders and decorations ==
Portrait by Jan Ksawery Kaniewski, 1856

- Russian Empire - Order of St. Stanislav 3rd class (1840)
- Russian Empire - Order of St. George 4th class (1849)
- Russian Empire - Order of St. Vladimir 3rd class (1860)
- Russian Empire - Order of St. Stanislav of the 1st class for Muslims (1863)
- Russian Empire - Order of St. Anne of the 1st class for Muslims (1871)
- Russian Empire - Order of St. Vladimir 2nd class with swords (1878)
- Austrian Empire - Order of the Iron Crown, 2nd class (1850)
- Austrian Empire - Order of Leopold 2nd class (1853)
- Prussia - Order of the Red Eagle 3rd class (1853)
