= Gravestone of Gasim bey Zakir =

Monument in Shusha, Azerbaijan

Gravestone of Gasim bey Zakir (Azerbaijani: Qasım bəy Zakirin qəbirüstü abidəsi)
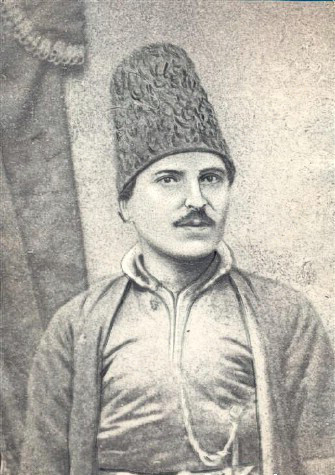
- Location: Mirza Hasan cemetery, Shusha, Azerbaijan
- Designer: Namig Dadashov
- Material: bronze
- Completion date: 1984
- Dedicated date: Gasim bey Zakir

Gravestone of Gasim bey Zakir (Azerbaijani: Qasım bəy Zakirin qəbirüstü abidəsi) is the monument erected in 1984 on the grave of Gasim bey Zakir at the Mirza Hasan cemetery in Shusha. The monument was a victim of vandalism during the capture of Shusha city.

== History ==
In connection with the 200th anniversary of the birth of the poet Gasim bey Zakir, according to the special decision of the Central Committee of the Communist Party of Azerbaijan, in 1984, a monument was erected on his grave at the Mirza Hasan cemetery in Shusha. Previously, there was a tomb on the poet's grave.

The author of the monument on the grave of Gasim bey Zakir was Namig Dadashov, Honored artist, sculptor, member of the Union of Artists of Azerbaijan.

The gravestone of Gasim bey Zakir is on a small hill — in the area belonging to the Javanshir clan. The graves of famous people who lived in the 19th century, buried around the grave of Gasim bey Zakir, were also restored, flowers and trees were planted on the small hill, and lawns were laid.

The monument was destroyed during the capture of Shusha city. The monument has been registered by the Ministry of Culture and Tourism of the Republic of Azerbaijan as a historical and cultural monument of national importance.
