= Abdulla Pasha Janizade =

Azerbaijani poet

- Born: 1782; Shusha, Karabakh Khanate
- Died: 1840; Shusha, Russian Empire
- Occupation: Poet

Abdulla Pasha Janizade (Azerbaijani: Abdulla Paşa Canızadə; 1782, Shusha, Karabakh Khanate- 1938, Shusha, Russian Empire) was an Azerbaijani poet. He wrote under the pseudonym Ganbar.

== Life ==
Abdulla Pasha Janizade (or Janioglu) was born in the city of Shusha in 1782. Abdullah, whose main occupation was trade, was close friends with representatives of the progressive intelligentsia, poets, musicians, and singers.

He wrote many poems both in classical and lyrical style. There are also folk and satirical poems. But he is most famous for his epigrams. A number of his works he published under the pseudonym Ganbar. Some examples of the poet's work were included in the "Collection of the most popular poets of Azerbaijan" (late XIX - early XX centuries), prepared by Mirza Huseyn Afandi Qayibov, as well as in the anthology collection "Riyazul-aşiqin" by Mukhammadag Mustakhidzade and "Təzkireyi-Həvvab" by Mir Mohsun Navvab.

Abdullah Janioglu died in 1840 in Shusha.

== See also ==
- Abdullah bey Asi
