= Gasim bey Zakir =

19th century Azerbaijani poet

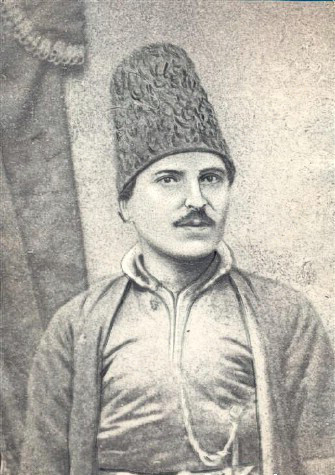
- Born: c. 1784; Sarjiali, Karabakh Khanate
- Died: 1857 (aged 72–73); Shusha, Shushinsky Uyezd, Russian Empire
- Burial place: Mirza Hassan Cemetery
- Occupation: Poet
- Military career
- Conflicts: Russo-Persian War (1806-1813); Russo-Persian War (1826–1828); Caucasian War

Gasim bey Ali bey oglu, better known by his pen name Zakir (Note: Spelled Kāṣīm Bey Ḏh̲ākir according to the transliteration system of the Encyclopaedia of Islam, 2nd edition.) (Azerbaijani: Qasım bəy Zakir; died 1857) was an Azerbaijani poet of the 19th century and one of the founders of the critical realism and satirical genre in Azerbaijani literature. He is considered to be the foremost Azerbaijani poet and satirist of the first half of the 19th century, and the greatest master of 19th-century comic poetry in Azerbaijani.

== Background ==
His birth year varies by source from 1774 (Note: Although the entry on "Ḏh̲ākir" mentions that his birth date was probably 1786, the entry on "Ād̲h̲arī (Azerī)" mentions his birth date as 1774.), 1779, 1786 and even to 1790, but modern scholarship agrees that he was born in 1784 in a noble family of beys (lords, chiefs) in Sarijali village. His father was Ali bey and his mother was Nanash Khanum, descended from nobility as well. After a while, they moved to Panahabad (modern-day Shusha), then the capital of the Karabakh Khanate. He had four younger brothers named Shahveren bey, Mahmud bey, Shirin bey and Alimadad bey. Zakir's family belonged to the clan of Javanshir, which was the ruling clan in the Karabakh Khanate. He was descended from Sahliyali Khan, an uncle of Panah Ali.

Little knowledge exists about childhood of Gasim bey. He received a standard Muslim nobility education, learning Persian in childhood.

According to Firudin bey Kocharli, who quoted his own father as an eyewitness, Gasim bey was described as an "esteemed gentleman" who was of "pleasant appearance and demeanour":

Fair-skinned, tall, and slender in build. He had beautiful, intelligent eyes with a hint of blue. His noble bearing and valour were evident in his features, movements, and manner of speech. He spoke eloquently and had a charming voice that drew people to him; when he spoke, it was impossible not to listen.

Due to a somewhat fiery temperament, his actions could sometimes appear abrupt. However, unfairness or dishonourable behaviour would provoke his natural sense of justice and lead to fierce anger. Yet his temper would soon subside, and he would seek forgiveness and repentance.

In his usual state, he was known to be very kind-natured, gentle, compassionate, and honourable.

== Military career ==
As a young man, he served in the Caucasian Muslim Volunteer Cavalry unit and took part in Pyotr Kotlyarevsky's Talish campaign in 1812 during Russo-Iranian wars of 1806–1813. He later joined defence of Shusha during 48-day long siege by Abbas Mirza in Russo-Persian War (1826–1828). Later in a report to Ivane Abkhazi on 24 April 1828, he noted crossing the Aras river and relocating about 500 households from Soraglu tribe to be settled in Tugh. For his distinction in combat, he was awarded a silver medal by imperial decree dated 15 March 1828. Later, he joined 42nd Jaeger Regiment under Aleksandr Miklashevsky and even saved his life during operations in Jar during Caucasian War. He was lated granted the village Xındırıstan by Mehdigulu khan Javanshir.

== Problems with Tarkhan-Mouravi ==
Through his satirical poetry, Zakir vigorously rebuked the religious fanaticism of the clergy (mullahs) as well as the corruption and misrule by the local aristocracy (beyzadehs) and the Tsarist officials. Georgian officials – Alexander Tarkhanov (provincial governor of Kabirli) and his brother Konstantin Tarkhan-Mouravi (governor of Shusha) had disputes regarding Javanshir clan's properties. Even though Alexander was relieved from his post, Konstantin reportedly took offence. According to Rzagulu bey Vazirov (son of Mirza Jamal Javanshir), Tarkhan-Mouravi arrested Zakir's nephew Rustam bey in Shusha prison and later executed him alleging escape attempt. This prompted his other nephew Behbud bey's to pursue outlaw (Azerbaijani: qaçaq) life.

The conflict escalated in October 1849 when Tarkhan-Mouravi accused Zakir of sheltering Behbud bey, who was now wanted by imperial authorities. Using this as a pretext, Tarkhan-Mouravi launched a raid on Zakir's estate with an armed detachment accompanied by Jafargulu agha Javanshir. Zakir's son Najafgulu bey and nephew Iskandar bey were arrested on charges of aiding the fugitive and sent to prison in Shusha. Zakir and his entire household were also detained and imprisoned. Following the arrests, Tarkhan-Mouravi reportedly ordered the looting of Xındırıstan, leaving its residents in destitution. Behbud bey was later executed in prison. Despite Zakir's repeated petitions to higher authorities protesting his unlawful detention, no official response was given. After spending nearly a year in Shusha prison without trial, Zakir was exiled to Baku. His relatives were sent further into internal exile, first to Tiflis, then to Voronezh and Kaluga.

Zakir continued to campaign for justice from Baku, appealing to allies within the bureaucracy such as Mirza Fatali Akhundov, Ismayil bek Kutkashensky, and new Baku governor Mikhail Kolyubakin. These efforts eventually contributed to his release. The poet later referenced this persecution in his verse, naming Tarkhan-Mouravi among his chief tormentors.

He eventually died in 1857 in Shusha and was buried in Mirza Hassan Cemetery.

== Poetry ==
Gasim bey was the prominent representative of critical realism of Azerbaijani literature in the first half of the 19th century. Some of Zakir's complaints and pleas for help (shekayat-nameh), which he wrote in verse, have been preserved and published. These works, written in masterful verse, were addressed to influential fellow countrymen such as Mirza Fatali Akhundov and the first Azerbaijani novelist Ismayil bek Kutkashensky, who had achieved a high rank in the Imperial Russian Army. Zakir's writing style was influenced by Molla Panah Vagif (1717–97). Zakir, like Vagif, preferred the simple popular lyric forms used in the ashik folk literature. Zakir also wrote some poems in Persian and in traditional metric forms, as well as some pieces in rhymed prose. Zakir's fables in verse were written in the then-common oriental tradition first attested in Kalila wa-Dimna; however, they may have also been influenced by Ivan Krylov's (1768–1844) adaptations. In Zakir's works a number of Russian words from the terminology of administration made their first appearance in Azerbaijani.

Zakir's poetry was first published in 1854 in the Tiflis-based newspaper Kavkaz and in 1856 in Temir-Khan-Shura (now Buynaksk) by Mirza Yusuf Nersesov Karabaghi.

== Family ==
He was married three times:

1. A daughter of Gasim bey Vezirov
  - Ali bey (died young)
  - Agha bey (died young)
  - Najafgulu bey (died young)
2. Tukazban, a widower
  - Sadig bey (b. 1836)
3. Unnamed wife
  - Safarali bey (b. 1842)
  - Sahliyali bey (b. 1846)
  - Nanash khanum – married to Ali bey Fuladov with whom she had:
    - Abdullah bey Asi
    - Ibrahim Bey Azer

== Source ==
- Mammadova, Dilara (1985). Гасым бәј Закир: Мәгаләләр мәҹмуәси [Gasim bey Zakir: Collection of Articles] (in Azerbaijani). Elm.
- Kərimov, Raqub (2017). Qasım bəy Zakir: həyatı, dövrü, mühiti və müasirləri [Gasim bey Zakir: his life, period, environment and contemporaries] (PDF) (Doctoral Thesis) (in Azerbaijani). Baku: Azerbaijan National Academy of Sciences.
- Kərimov, Raqub (2013). Qasım bəy Zakir və müasirləri [Gasim bey Zakir and Contemporaries] (in Azerbaijani). Baku: Elm və təhsil.
