= Mirza Bakhish Nadim =

Azerbaijani Turkish poet and satirist (1785 – 1880)

- Born: 1785; Karabakh Khanate
- Died: 1857; Shusha, Shushinsky Uyezd, Russian Empire
- Resting place: Mirza Hassan Cemetery
- Occupation: Poet

Mirza Bakhish Nadim (1785; Navahı, Javad Khanate – 1880; Navahı, Javad uezd, Baku Governorate, Russian Empire) was an Azerbaijani Turkish poet and satirist who lived in the 19th century.

== Life ==
Mirza Bakhish Nadim was born in 1785 in Navahi village in a religious family. His family was originally from the city of Shamakhi. His father, Molla Asadullah, was one of the open-minded people of his time and raised his son in this way. Mirza Bakhish received his first education at home from his father, then he was sent to Shamakhi Madrasah. While studying at the madrasa, he also learned Arabic and Persian languages. After finishing his education, he returned to Navahi and started working here. Mirza Bakhish worked for the settlement of land and other issues of the peasants in the state bodies, for this he often represented the peasants in meetings with the state bodies in Salyan, Shamakhi and Baku. Because of this work, he was given the nickname Mirza. He was fired from his job due to problems with state authorities, but was later appointed to the position of head of the Pirsaat river water department. He died in Navahi village in 1880.

== Creativity ==
Mirza Bakhish Nadim, like most of his contemporaries, wrote both in the style of traditional ashug and classical poetry. His work includes a large number of goshmas, geraylis, ghazals, mukhammas, tarjibands, tarkibbends, hijvs and satire. Its satires “The Great Hungry Year in Navagi and the neighboring village in 1879”, “Description of the winter”, "The work of the water chief" against the beys and khans brought him wide fame. In an important part of his poems, he criticized the rules and laws of his time, state bodies, beys and khans.

One of Nadim's significant works is a historical poem describing the conquest of the Ganja, Shirvan, Baku, Guba, Erivan and Derbent khanates by the Russian Empire. He describes various bloody battle scenes of the Azerbaijani khanates, the conquest of Ganja, the oppression of the Azerbaijani peasants. The poet also described the hard and difficult life of the people, and in passages complained about his financial difficulties. His poems of this type include the satires "Egyptian grandson of Imamverdi", "Murad Khan", "Karbalayi", "Mahmud". His satirical poems were similar to the poems of Gasim Bey Zakir.

Mirza Bakhish's works, which were not published in the press of that time, were considered lost for a long time. Thus, until 2017, only a few poems of Mirza Bakish were known. However, in 2017, employees of the Institute of Manuscripts of the Azerbaijan National Academy of Sciences, Pasha Karimov and Ragub Karimov, discovered two collections of handwritten poems. A book was prepared based on these poems. During the examination of these new works, it became clear that Mirza Bakhish was the author of many lyrical and religious poems as well as satirical poems. According to researchers, there are still manuscripts of his poems. It is likely that after the discovery of these works, a complete idea of his creativity can be given.
