= Mir Faseh cemetery =

Cemetery in Shusha, Azerbaijan

- Azerbaijani: Mir Faseh qəbiristanlığı
- Interactive map of Mir Faseh cemetery

Details
- Established: 18th century
- Location: Shusha, Jidir Plain
- Country: Azerbaijan
- Coordinates: 39.75083°N 46.75861°E
- Type: muslim cemetery

Mir Faseh cemetery (Azerbaijani: Mir Faseh qəbiristanlığı) — A Muslim cemetery located on the Jidir Plain of Shusha.

== History ==
Apart from the specified cemeteries, in the southeast of the city there was a small, but much esteemed cemetery of Mir Faseh. It was called in honour of the grandfather of Mir Mohsun Navvab, Agha Mir Faseh Agha, a well-known scientist, poet and musicologist who had been buried there first. The cemetery was beatified by Mir Mohsun Navvab. Molla Panah Vagif was buried at the very precipice near Jidir plain that was located close to this cemetery. Navvab in one of his works called "Tazkire" described this event. After the murder of Agha Mohammad Shah, the power in Garabagh passed to the son of the nephew of Ibrahim Khan Mehrali bey, Mohammad Bey. Having suspected Molla Panah Vagif of relations with Ibrahim Khan, the latter, ordered to execute him together with his son. They were brought to the rock of Khazna "Adam atilan" (meaning 'a rock of suicides'), from where upon orders of Vagif many people had been thrown. Having learnt that his son would be the first to be thrown from the rock in his presence, Vagif started to cry and resist. As a result, both of them were executed and then buried here. Later, a dome — shaped mausoleum was built over the tomb, which became a place of pilgrimage of Shusha citizens.

There were also some other cemeteries located at the city prison and close to the spring of Shor Bulag.

== See also ==
- Shusha

== Literature ==
- Qajar, Chingiz (2009). Old Shusha. Baku: Şərq-Qərb.
