= Qutqashen Sultanate =

Feudal state in Azerbaijan

Qutqashen Sultanate (Azerbaijani: Qutqaşın sultanlığı) also known as Qabala mahaly (Azerbaijani: Qəbələ mahalı) was feudal state which existed from the middle to the end of 18th century in the north of Azerbaijan, in the territories covering the present day Qabala Rayon.

== Historical background ==
Qabala was ancient capital of the Caucasian Albania. Archeological evidence indicates that the city functioned as the capital of the Caucasian Albania as early as the 4th century BC. Ruins of the ancient town are in 15 km from regional center, allocated on the territory between Garachay and Jourluchay rivers. Qabala was located in the middle of the 2500 old Silk Road and was mentioned in works of Pliny the Younger as "Kabalaka", Greek geographer Ptolemy as "Khabala", Arabic historian Ahmad ibn Yahya al-Baladhuri as "Khazar". In the 19th century, the Azerbaijani historian Abbasgulu Bakikhanov mentioned in his book "Gulistani Irem" that Kbala or Khabala were in fact Qabala. In 60s B.C., Roman troops attacked Caucasian Albania but did not succeed in capturing the Qabala territory. In 262, Caucasian Albania was occupied by Sassanid Empire but preserved its political and economic status. In 464 AD, it lost its independence due to years of invasions from the northern nomadic tribes and had to move its capital city to Partava (currently Barda in Azerbaijan). Qabala was occupied by Shirvanshah Fariburz, Georgian tsar David III of Tao in 1120, Mongol khan Timurleng in 1386, Safavid shah Tahmasib I in 1538, Persian Nader Shah in 1734 but was able to preserve its culture and identity. After the death of Nader Shah in 1747, Azerbaijan split into independent khanates and sultanates and Qabala became a sultanate. It was also called Qabala Mahali. The sultanate is subordinate to the Shaki Khanate. As the sultanate was located on a small territory, its independence did not last long. The new ruler Kalbalı Sultan has managed to remain in power for a while, taking advantage of the feuds between the Sheki and Arash feudal lords. However, he died in one of the feudal internecine wars. After that, the Gutqashen Sultanate was included in the Sheki Khanate as a district. The district was governed by naibs appointed by the Sheki khans and local Gutqashen sultans. After Azerbaijan was occupied by Russian Empire in 1813 it conducted administrative reforms and in 1841 Azerbaijani khanates were terminated and the territories were incorporated into governorates. Qabala sultanate was abolished and area was added to Nukha uyezd of Elisabethpol Governorate. Due to archeological finds in Qabala, it was declared a National State Reserve in 1985.

Azerbaijani writer and Imperial Russian general Ismayil bek Kutkashensky was a descendant of Qutqashen Sultans.

== Rulers of the sultanate ==
- Haji Safi Sultan
- Kalbali Sultan, ruled until 1779
- Haji Nasrullah

== Picture gallery ==
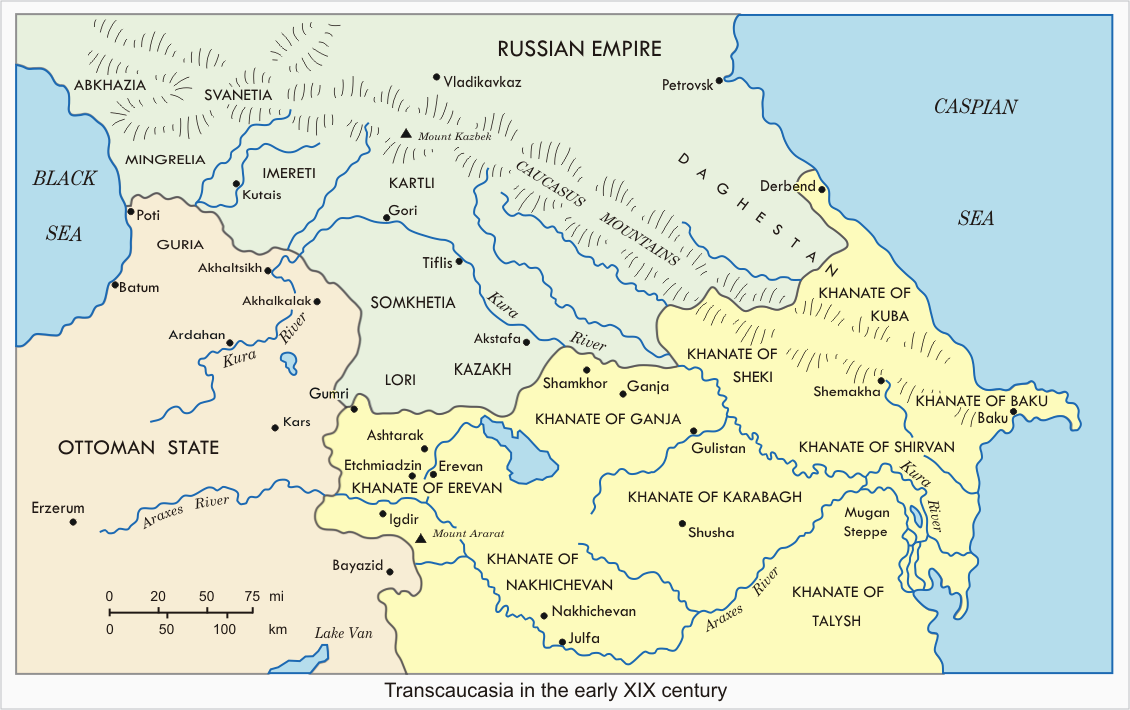
Khanates of the Caucasus in the 18th and 19th centuries

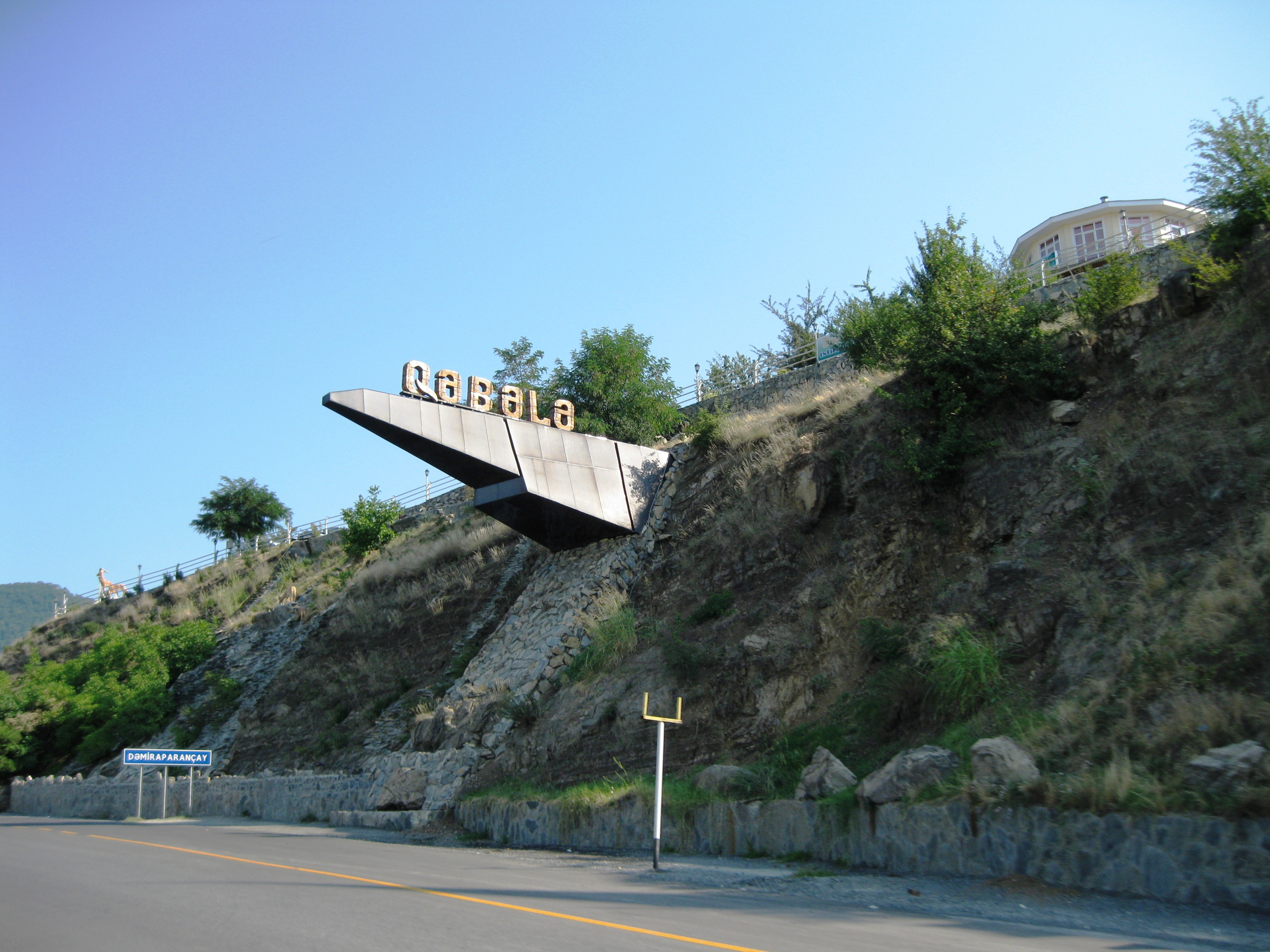
Entering Qabala

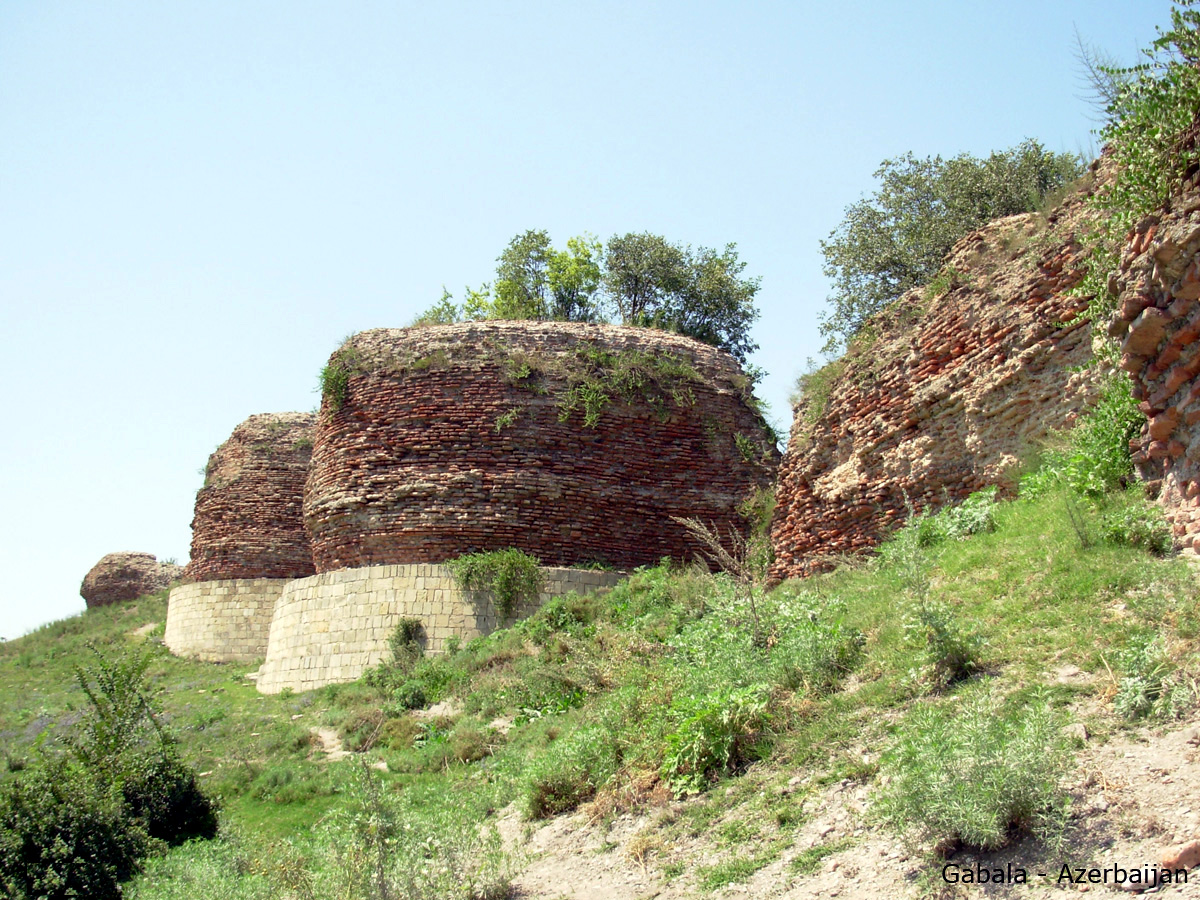
Ancient Qabala fortress

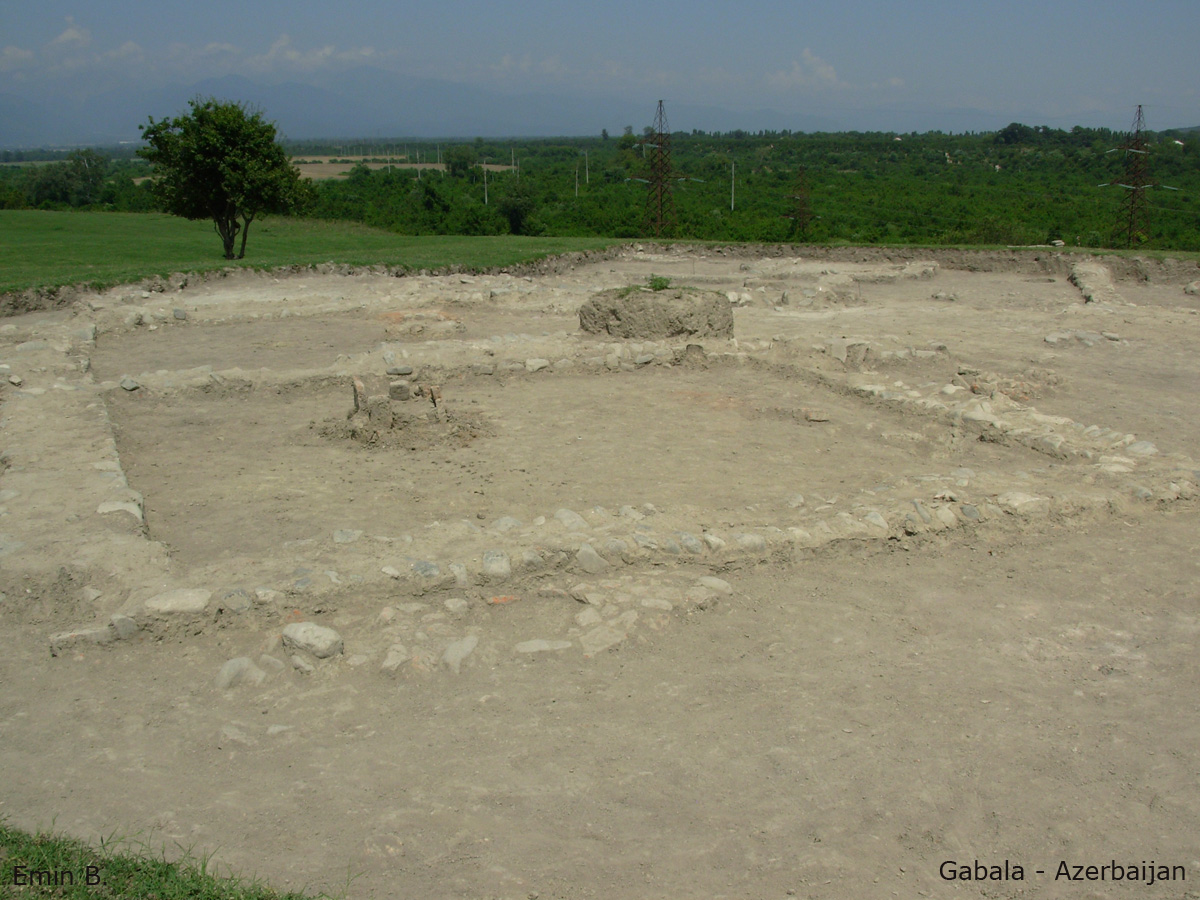
Archeological site of Qabala fortress

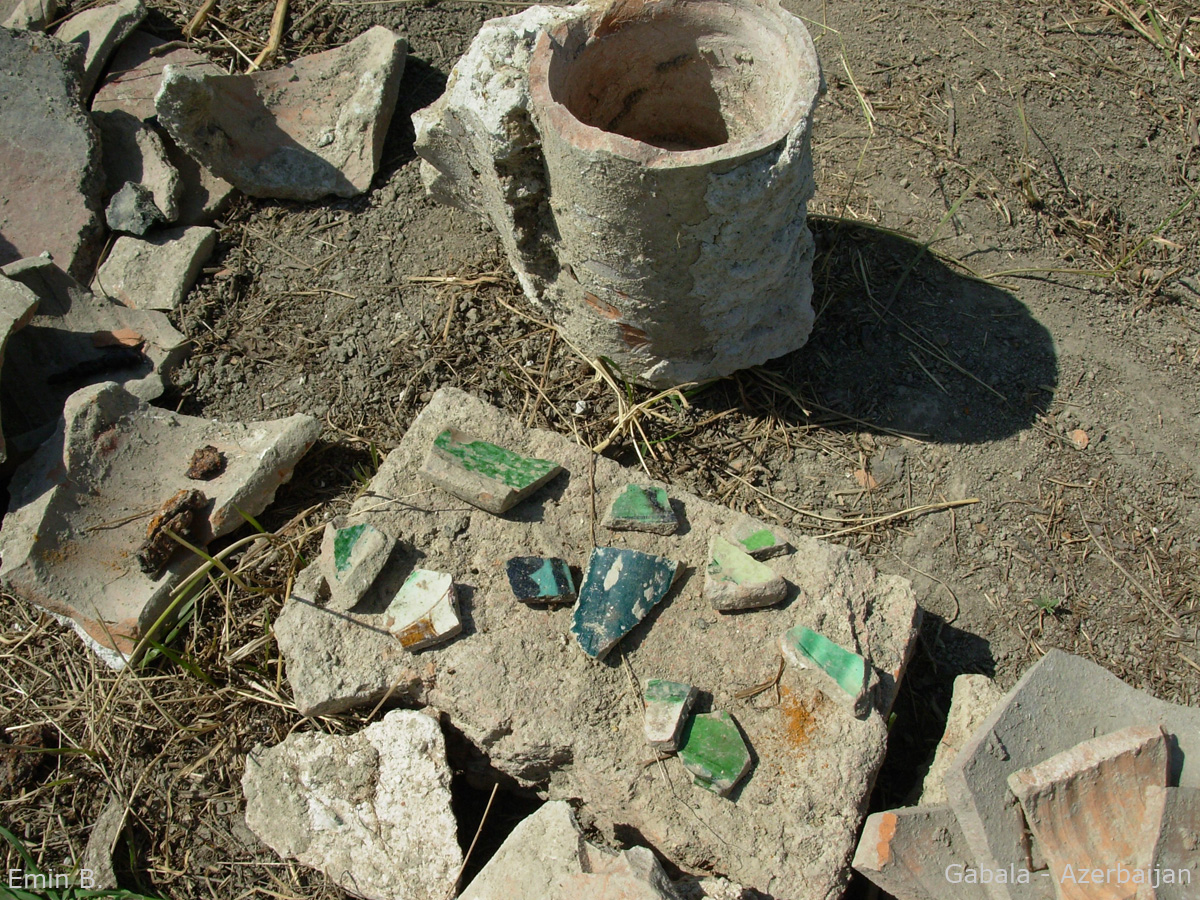
Archaeological Excavations of Ancient Qabala - Glazed ceramic and ceramic pipe

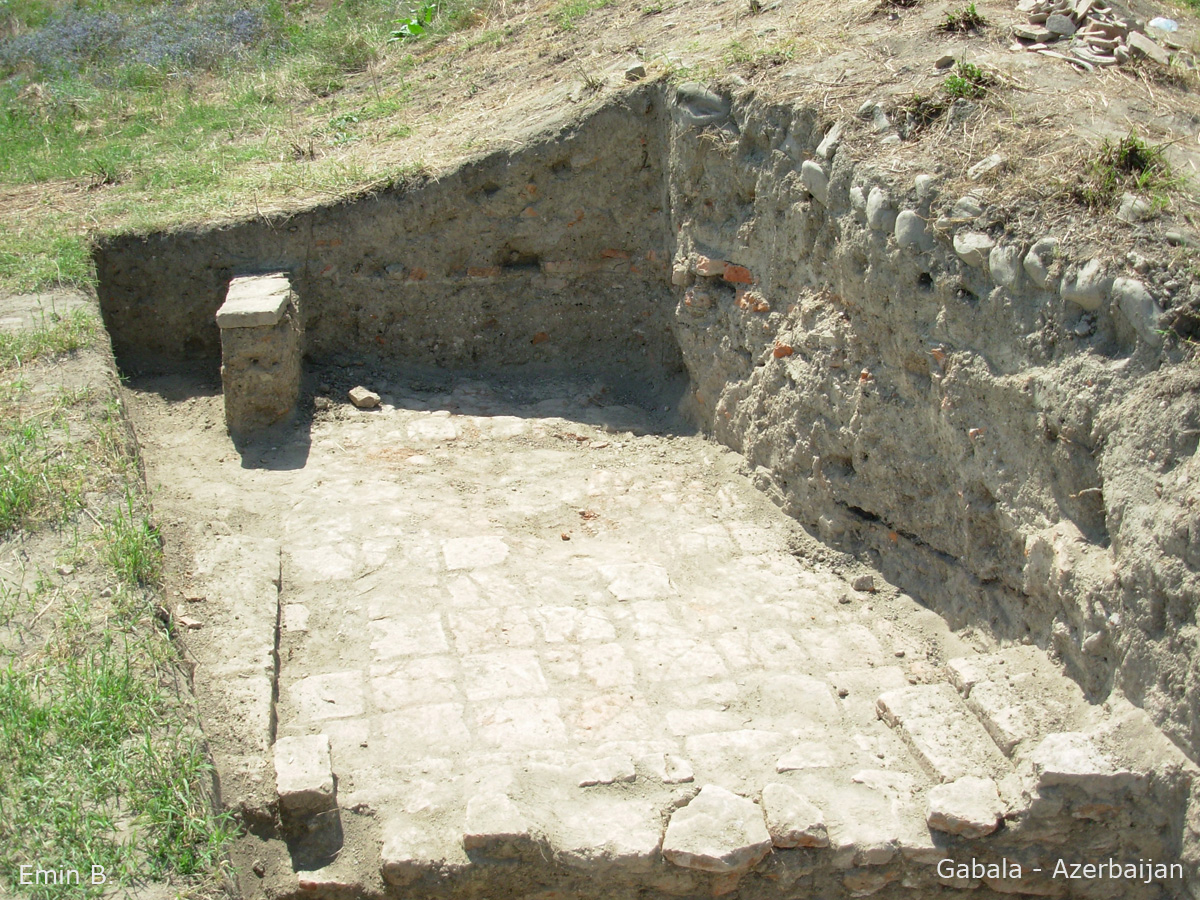
Archeological excavations

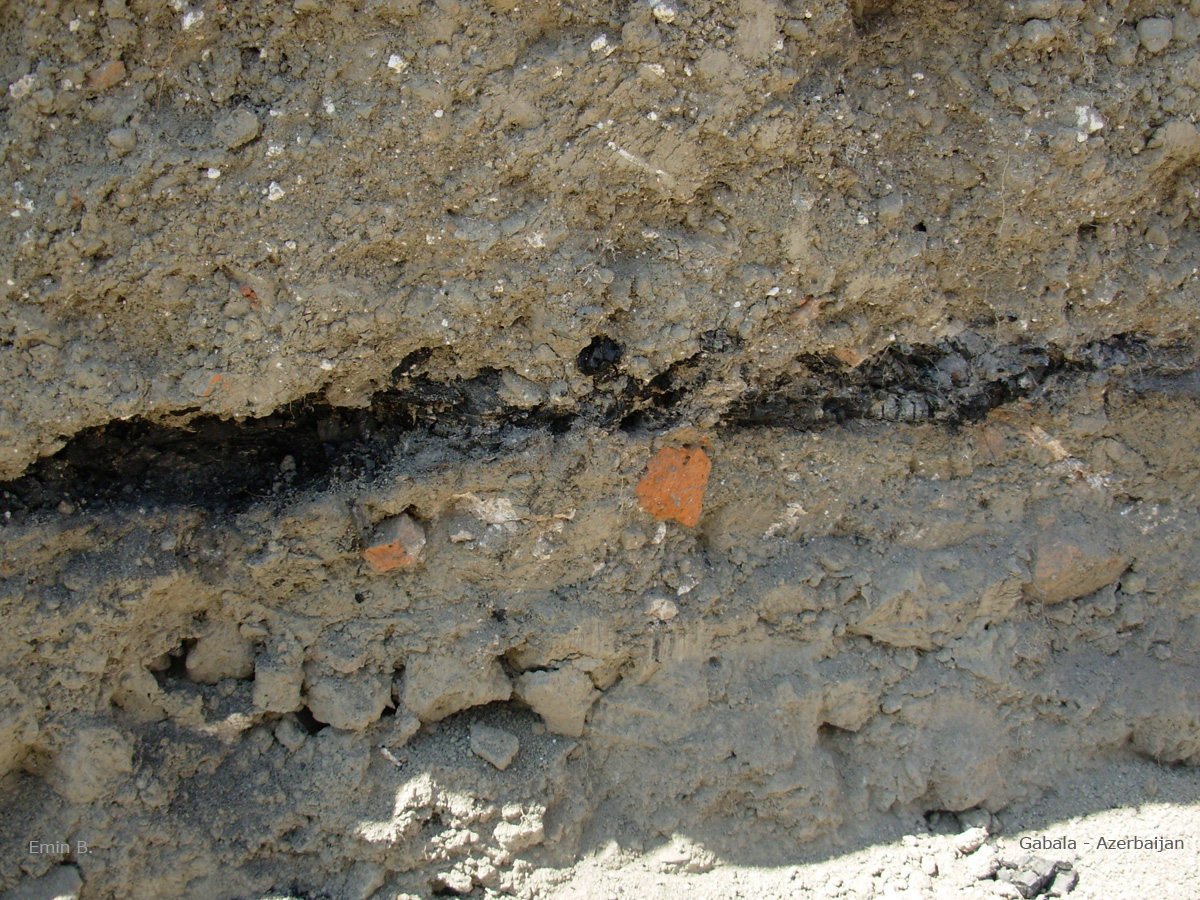
Archeological excavations in Qabala

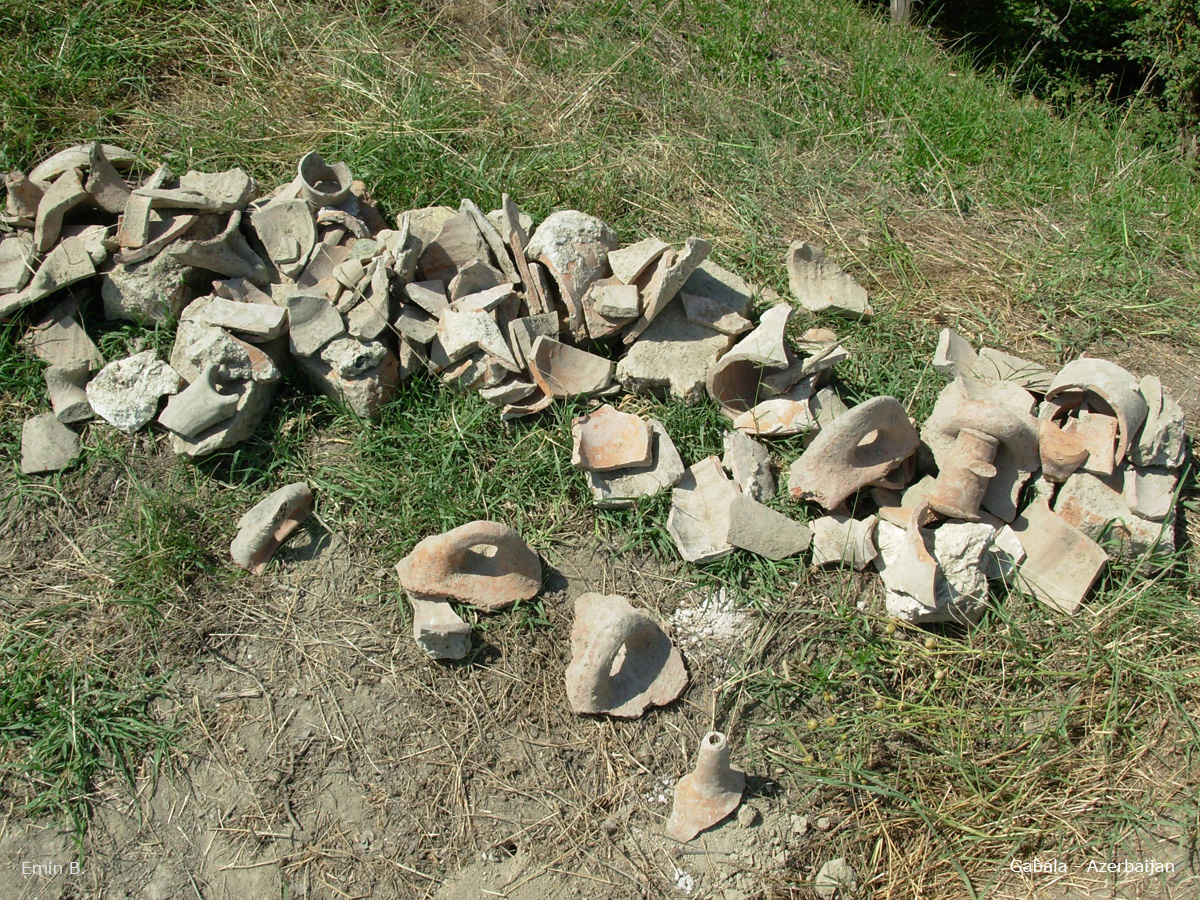
Ceramic finds

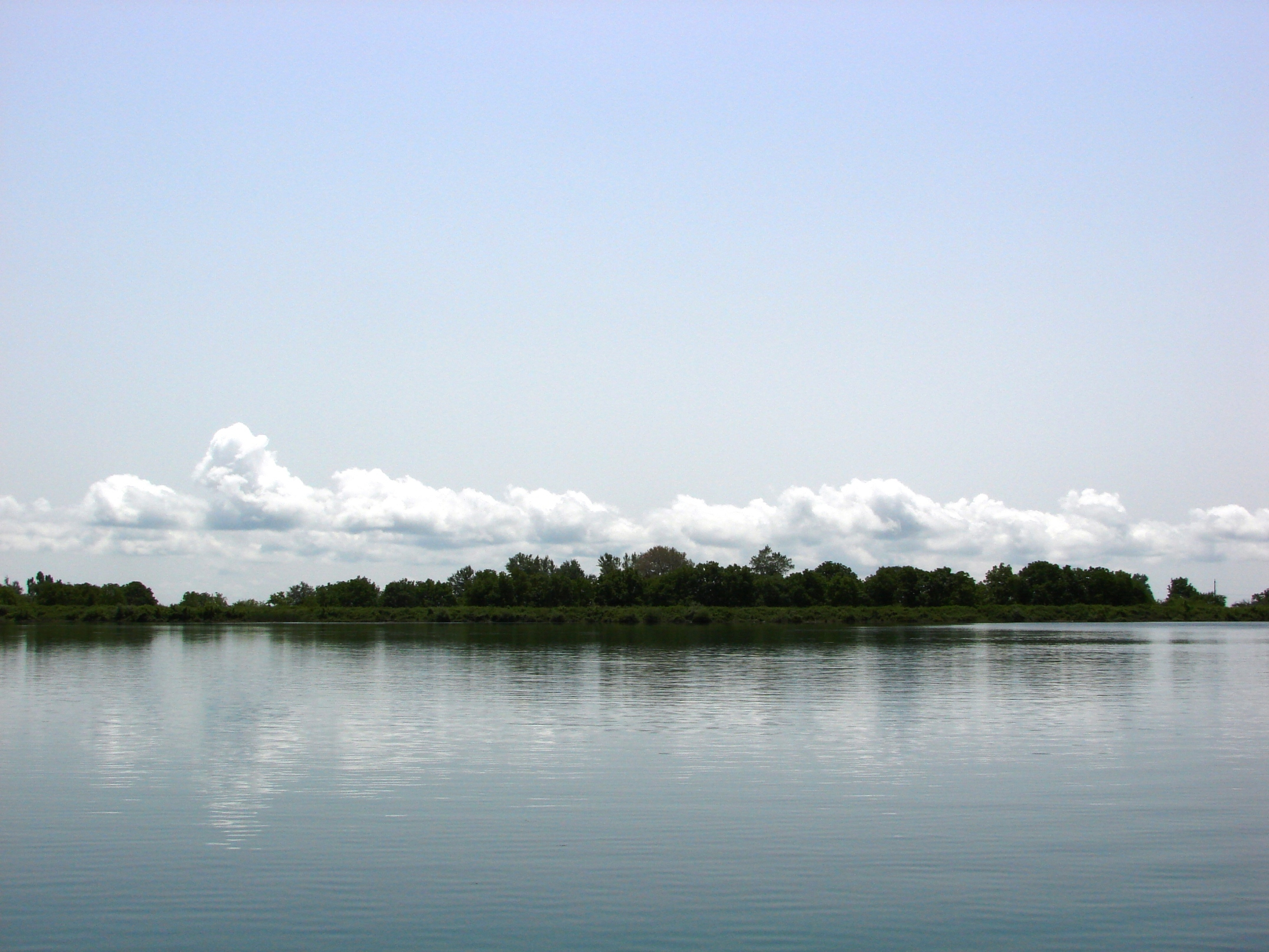
Qabala lake

== See also ==
- Khanates of the Caucasus
- Qabala
