= Mirza Hassan Cemetery =

Cemetery in Shusha, Azerbaijan

- Interactive map of Mirza Hassan Cemetery

Details
- Location: Shusha, Azerbaijan
- Country: Azerbaijan

Mirza Hassan Cemetery is one of the four ancient Muslim cemeteries located in Shusha.

== History ==
The cemetery is located in the north-eastern part of Shusha city. It was built in the late 18th and early 19th centuries. The name is related to Mirza Hassan Vazirov, a representative of the Vazirovs, one of Shusha's famous families. He lived in Shaki due to his work, and after his death, according to his will, he was buried in Shusha on the side of the road where his beloved girl used to go. After Mirza Hasan was buried there, the cemetery was named after him. The family cemetery of the Azerbaijani branch of the Qajar dynasty is also located inside the cemetery. Members of the dynasty, along with members of the famous families of Shusha, were buried in the cemetery, as well as common people. The name of the family to which the deceased belonged, the person's rank and titles are also written on the graves. After the occupation of Shusha by Armenians, the cemetery was destroyed.

== Notable burials ==
- Gasim bey Zakir
- Karbalayi Safikhan Karabakhi
- Mirza Jamal Javanshir
- Mirza Alesger Novras
- Rzagulu bey Vazirov
- Khosrov bey Poladov
- Mirza Sadig Latifov

== See also ==
- Mir Faseh cemetery
