= Mirza Sadig Latifov =

Azerbaijani poet

- Born: 1852; Shusha, Elizavetpol Governorate, Caucasus Viceroyalty, Russian Empire
- Died: 1901; Shusha, Elizavetpol Governorate, Caucasus Viceroyalty, Russian Empire
- Occupation(s): poet, doctor and teacher

Mirza Sadig Latifov (Azerbaijani: Mirzə Sadıq Mirzə Əbdüllətif oğlu Lətifov; b. April 19, 1852, Shusha, Russian Empire - 1901, Shusha, Russian Empire) was a poet, doctor, teacher and member of the "Mejlisi Faramushan" literary society. He was from the Russian Empire and was ethnically Azeri.

== Life ==
Mirza Sadig was born in 1852 in the city of Shusha. He belonged to the family of Latifovs known in Karabakh and Shusha. His father, Mirza Abdullatif, was a clergyman, teacher and calligrapher. His grandfather Molla Kelbali was one of the clerics close to the palace of Ibrahim Khalil Khan. Baba bey Shakir wrote about him in his poems and called him a scientist. Sadig received his primary education from his older brother, Molla Mehdigulu. He then went to Tabriz to continue his education. There he studied under the head physician Mirza Abdulhasan, one of the greatest scientists of that period. Then he continued his education with a German teacher. He completed his higher education and returned to Shusha. Mirza Sadig Latifov was engaged in medicine and teaching in Shusha. He treated the Khan's daughter Khurshidbanu Natavan and taught her children. He also worked as a Sharia teacher at the Shusha Realni School. One of his students was Yusif Vazir Chamanzaminli - famous Azerbaijani writer. Mirza Sadig was a poet and wrote poems under the pseudonyms "Tabib" and "Hijri". He was married to a woman named Gulbahar. They had sons Abdulhasan and Mahmud and a daughter, Zuleikha Khanym. Mirza Sadig Latifov died in 1901 and was buried at the Mirza Hassan Cemetery.
