= Maria Ikonina =

Russian ballerina (1788–1866)

Maria Ikonina (1788–1866) was a Russian ballerina. She was engaged at the Imperial Russian Ballet in 1806–1829, where she was a soloist and regarded as an elite member during her career. She was trained by Charles Didelot, who regarded her as one of his best pupils.
