= Ghazi Muhammad =

Imam of Dagestan
- Reign: 1829–1832
- Successor: Hamzat Bek
- Born: c. 1790; Gimry, Dagestan
- Died: 29 October [O.S. 17 October] 1832; Gimry, Dagestan
- Burial: Tarki, Dagestan (until 1843); Gimry, Dagestan
- Religion: Sunni Islam

Ghāzī Muḥammad ibn Ismāʿil al-Gimrāwī al-Dāghistānī (Arabic: غازي محمد ابن إسماعيل الڮمراوي الداغستاني; Avar: ГъазимухIамад; c. 1790 – 29 October [O.S. 17 October] 1832), called Kazi-Mulla (Кази-Мулла) or Kazi-Magoma (Кази-Магома) in Russian sources, was a Dagestani religious and political leader who served as the first imam (religious, political, and military leader) of Dagestan and Chechnya from 1828 to 1832. He led armed resistance against Russian expansion into the Caucasus until his death in battle in 1832.

After studying under several notable teachers, Ghazi Muhammad joined the Naqshbandi Sufi order and became a reputed Islamic scholar. He promoted adherence to sharia over customary law (adat), attracting many followers but often clashing with local secular and religious leaders. He initially advocated for passive resistance to Russian expansion, but further Russian encroachment in 1829, or the refusal of local leaders to accept his demands to adopt sharia, caused him to change his position. He was proclaimed Imam in late 1829 and declared a holy war (called ghazavat) against the Russians in 1830. At the peak of his power in 1831, he ruled over most of Chechnya and Dagestan. After a number of military setbacks in late 1831 and 1832, Ghazi Muhammad lost most of his support and was killed in a last stand against a Russian force in his native village of Gimry in October 1832. He was immediately succeeded by one of his followers, Hamzat Bek. The imamate founded by Ghazi Muhammad continued fighting against the Russians and their local allies under his successors until its final defeat in 1859.

== Early life and education ==
Ghazi Muhammad was born sometime in the early 1790s (Note: Most of sources give the year of his birth as 1793 and 1795, although some authors place his birth many years earlier. Moshe Gammer writes that all that can be established is that he was a few years older than Shamil, which points to the early 1790s.) in the village of Gimry in the Koysubu confederation (nahiya) of Avar villages in Dagestan. According to the late-19th-century Avar-language chronicle of Hasanilaw al-Gimrawi, the names of his parents were Muhammad, son of Ismail, and Bagistan, and he had two sisters named Aminat (Amina) and Patimat (Fatima). His father (died 1823) was a learned man (alim) and a skilled craftsman from the neighboring confederation of Gidatl. His mother was a native of Gimry. Ghazi means 'warrior of the faith' in Arabic; some sources treat this as a title he received after the start of the Islamic holy war (ghazavat) (Note: In the Caucasus, the term ghazavat, literally "conquest," refers to holy war for Islam and is identical to the term jihad.) against the Russians, but according to Hasanilaw, this was part of his given name, and he was called "Ghozo" or "Ghazi" for short, like others in his village with this name. Modern scholars believe that Ghazi Muhammad came from an influential family of uzdens (free peasants) from the Gidatl confederation whose ancestors had lived in the village of Urada in the mid-18th century. As the son of migrants, Ghazi Muhammad was considered "rootless" by the inhabitants of Gimry. The 19th-century chronicler Muhammad Tahir al-Qarakhi describes Ghazi Muhammad as a Gimry native "who did not have a large family on which to rely." The historian M. G. Nurmagomedov believes Ghazi Muhammad to have been descended from the well-known Dagestani Islamic scholar Ibrahim Hajji al-Uradi.

At the age of ten he was sent to the village of Karanay in the Shamkhalate of Tarki to study Arabic and the Quran. After completing his initial training, he visited other Dagestani centers of learning and studied under various respected ulama, such as Sayyid al-Harakani, the chief qadi (village judge) of Harakan. In 1825, he went to Gazi-Kumukh to visit the sheikhs of the Naqshbandi Sufi order. The Naqshbandiyya is one of the main Sufi tariqas (orders) in the Muslim world; one of its branches, the Naqshbandiyya-Khalidiyya, had established itself in the Caucasus in the 1810s. Although he is said to have initially been suspicious of the order, he soon became a dedicated member and studied under the Naqshbandi sheikh Jamal al-Din al-Ghazi-Ghumuqi. He also introduced Shamil, his close friend and distant relative by marriage, to his teacher. After Ghazi Muhammad completed his initial training, Jamal al-Din took him to his own murshid (teacher), Muhammad al-Yaraghi, under whom Ghazi Muhammad completed his training. Al-Yaraghi gave Ghazi Muhammad his daughter in marriage and, according to some sources, granted him the title of sheikh and permission (ijaza) to initiate new members into the order. Modern historians disagree on whether Ghazi Muhammad was considered a Sufi sheikh in his lifetime or just a disciple of Jamal al-Din and al-Yaraghi. According to Abd al-Rahman al-Ghazi-Ghumuqi (son of Jamal al-Din), Ghazi Muhammad "loved to read books about the sharia" (Islamic law) and had a good knowledge of them. He was especially well-versed in the tafsirs (exegesis of the Quran) and lives of the Prophet Muhammad.

== Popularity, reception, and rise ==
Ghazi Muhammad then began his career as mullah (teacher) and qadi (judge) in his home village of Gimry. He soon became famous in Koysubu and beyond for his piety and learning. He amassed a growing following, probably drawing most of his followers from the students and young warriors of the local communities. Sometime in the mid-1820s, he began calling on Muslims to adopt Sharia as the sole legal system and abandon the use of customary law (adat or urf). In particular, Ghazi Muhammad was in favor of the legal norms of the Shafi'i school. He was drawing from an older tradition of criticism of customary law within the Dagestani context going back to Muhammad ibn Musa al-Quduqi (died c. 1717). In 1826/7, he succeeded in getting the inhabitants of Gimry to abandon customary law and adhere exclusively to Sharia. Sometime later, he did the same in the other Avar villages of Koysubu and the adjacent confederation of Salatau. The historian Michael Kemper writes that this probably entailed enforcing the application of corporal punishment for adultery and alcohol consumption, forbidding dancing, musical instruments, and usury, and enforcing an Islamic dress and moral code for women. He also had murderers punished or forced to pay blood money instead of being exiled in accordance with customary law. He demanded that Muslims show a basic level of Islamic knowledge, namely the meaning of the Shahada (profession of faith) and the "467 great sins." Ghazi Muhammad's condemnation of customary law brought him into conflict with local elites, the village elders and mullahs, since adat was the basis of their authority. People who accepted his teachings burned adat books and sometimes imprisoned or drove out adat experts. He and his followers punished those who would not accept his demands. His memorization of over four hundred ahadith allowed him to win many debates against rival preachers in the area. As his reputation grew, he was invited by many khanates and kingdoms, both those loyal to the Russian tsar and those which had not accepted Russian suzerainty. As a sign of humility, he refused to ride, but would walk.

== Holy war ==
=== Beginning ===
Initially, Ghazi Muhammad called only for passive resistance to Russian expansion into the region. According to Moshe Gammer, renewed Russian expansion in late 1829 caused him to change his position. Vladimir Bobrovnikov writes that Ghazi Muhammad attributed the local rulers' resistance to his call to strictly implement sharia to Russian influence and eventually concluded that his goal could only be achieved through holy war against the Russians. In late 1829, he was proclaimed imam (religious, military and political leader) of Dagestan at a meeting with other members of the Naqshbandi order in Gimry; this was confirmed at another meeting in early 1830 which included representatives of the ulama and Dagestani notables. Ghazi Muhammad then sent messages to the people and rulers of Dagestan exhorting them to closely adhere to sharia and threatening to use force against those who would not comply. Soon after this, he declared the holy war against the Russians. Ghazi Muhammad's plan was opposed by some, including Sayyid al-Harakani, Shamil, and Jamal al-Din. He was able to overcome their opposition after receiving the blessing of al-Yaraghi. Jamal al-Din and Shamil came over to Ghazi Muhammad's side, but al-Harakani refused to join him. Ghazi Muhammad's followers went around Dagestani villages imposing their order and punishing local leaders who opposed them. In the village of Harakan, Ghazi Muhammad and his followers destroyed the house of Sayyid al-Harakani and ordered the disposal of the wine stored in the house and the village. Ghazi Muhammad acted especially harshly towards the local nobility, whom he saw as false believers (munafiqun) and collaborators of the Russians. During his time as imam, Ghazi Muhammad had 30 influential nobles executed.

A military-theocratic state, later known as the Imamate, began to form under Ghazi Muhammad. Around 8,000–10,000 followers soon flocked to Ghazi Muhammad. The core of Ghazi Muhammad's army was made up of his murids (disciples) and migrants from different parts of Dagestan and Chechnya. Ghazi Muhammad sometimes appointed na'ibs (deputies) to manage communities located further away from his center of power. The na'ibs were responsible for raising militias from the communities. He created a treasury (bayt al-mal), which regularly received zakat and sadaqa (almsgiving) payments and confiscated property of the movement's enemies and the local nobility; later it was also supplemented with military booty. According to Gammer, Ghazi Muhammad "established many, if not all, of the policies, practices, strategies and tactics which were followed by his successors."

=== 1830–1831 ===
In February 1830, Ghazi Muhammad entered into negotiations with Pakhu Bike, the regent of the Avar Khanate for her underage son. After she refused to join Ghazi Muhammad in the fight against the Russians, he unsuccessfully besieged the Avar capital Khunzakh. After this defeat, Ghazi Muhammad lost many of his supporters and went to live in isolation, praying and fasting in a hut on the outskirts of his home village. This pious living and withdrawal from political life improved Ghazi Muhammad's reputation. In late February-early March, a powerful earthquake occurred in Dagestan, which Ghazi Muhammad presented as divine punishment for the people's rejection of sharia. The imam's movement gradually recovered its strength, aided by several Russian missteps. The Russian major Ivan Korganov initially tried to negotiate with Ghazi Muhammad and get him to leave the country, but then organized more than one failed assassination attempts against him, further increasing the Ghazi Muhammad's popular support. The Russian capture of Jar-Balakan (south of Dagestan, in modern-day Azerbaijan) in March 1830 provoked many to flock to Ghazi Muhammad's banner. Between May and December 1830, forces under the leadership of Ghazi Muhammad's deputies fought with the Russians in the Alazani valley. In late May 1830, a Russian force of 6,000 men was sent against Gimry, but instead raided cattle from the villages of Hindal, provoking even more opposition to the Russians.

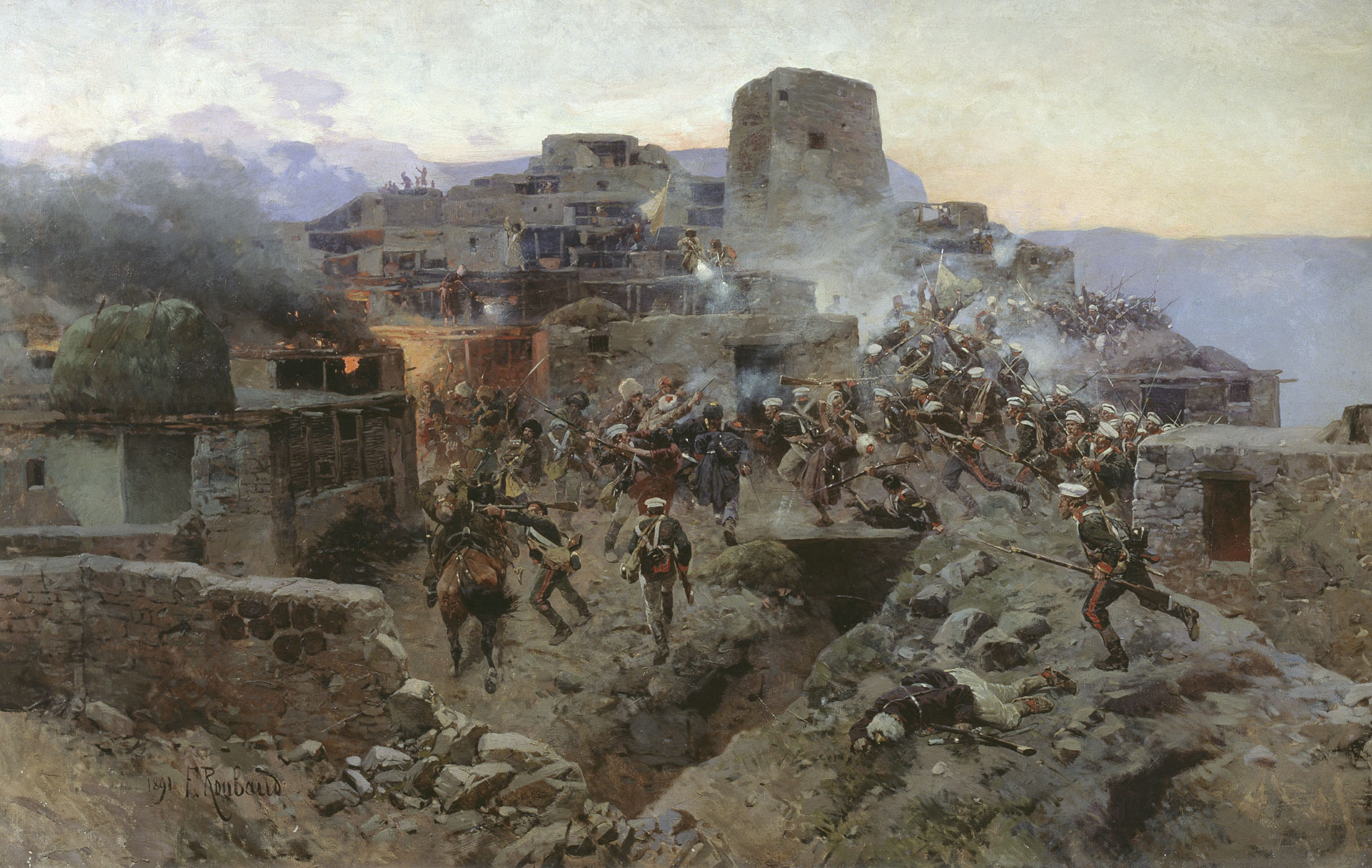
The Storming of Gimry, Franz Roubaud, 1891

Over the course of 1830, Ghazi Muhammad expanded his influence into Chechnya and won over more of the Kumyks. He was supported by the leaders of the Chechen rebellion that had occurred in 1825–26. In May 1830, he sent his deputy Abdallah al-Ashilti to Chechnya. Al-Ashilti was successful in gaining more support for Ghazi Muhammad among the notables of Chechnya. The imam personally traveled to Chechnya in September–October 1830 to strengthen his power there. In March 1831, Ghazi Muhammad's forces took up positions in Aghach Qala, from which they could simultaneously defend Hindal and threaten the Russians in the nearby lowlands. He successfully fought off Russian attacks on his position in April and May 1831. Ghazi Muhammad took advantage of the withdrawal of some Russian units to deal with the Polish uprising. He captured Tarki but was driven back to Aghach Qala by Russian reinforcements. In June, he besieged the Russian fort Vnezapnaya and then withdrew to a forest followed by 2500 Russian troops under the command of General Emmanuel. His forces killed or wounded 400 of them, wounding the general, and returned to Aghach Qala. For eight days in August, he besieged Derbent, the only city in Dagestan, before being forced to withdraw into the mountains. Around October the Russians attacked the Salatau plateau, but Ghazi Muhammad drew them away by threatening Grozny. On November 1, he sacked Kizlyar and took 168 prisoners, mostly women, whom he ransomed. The year 1831 marked the height of Ghazi Muhammad's successes, when his authority encompassed most of Chechnya and Dagestan.

=== Setbacks and defeat ===
In December 1831, Ghazi Muhammad attempted a static defense at Aghach Qala. Most of the 600 defenders were killed when the Russians attacked in on December 13, although Ghazi Muhammad and some others were able to escape. In April 1832, he suddenly besieged Nazran near Vladikavkaz. However, his plans to win over all of the Ingush and Ossetians and cut off the Georgian Military Road failed and he soon moved to the vicinity of Grozny. In early July, the Russians captured the fort built by Ghazi Muhammad's forces near Erpeli. In August 1832, a 15,000–20,000 strong Russian force devastated lower Chechnya. In response, Ghazi Muhammad advanced on Vnezapnaya and on August 18 he raided near Amir-Hadji-Yurt on the Terek River, drew 500 Cossacks into a forest and killed or wounded 155 of them. On September 10, he retreated to Gimry and prepared its defenses for a major attack. There was talk of a truce, but the Russians would accept nothing less than the Ghazi Muhammad's surrender. By the fall of 1832, Ghazi Muhammad had lost the support of most of the mountain communities. On 29 October [O.S. 17 October] 1832, a sudden Russian advance trapped Ghazi Muhammad and some of his followers in a fortified house at Gimry. With no possibility of escape, Ghazi Muhammad is said to have drawn his sword and jumped from the house onto the Russian bayonets, dying immediately. Of those who were besieged with Ghazi Muhammad in the fortification, only Shamil, who was wounded, and one other person managed to escape alive.

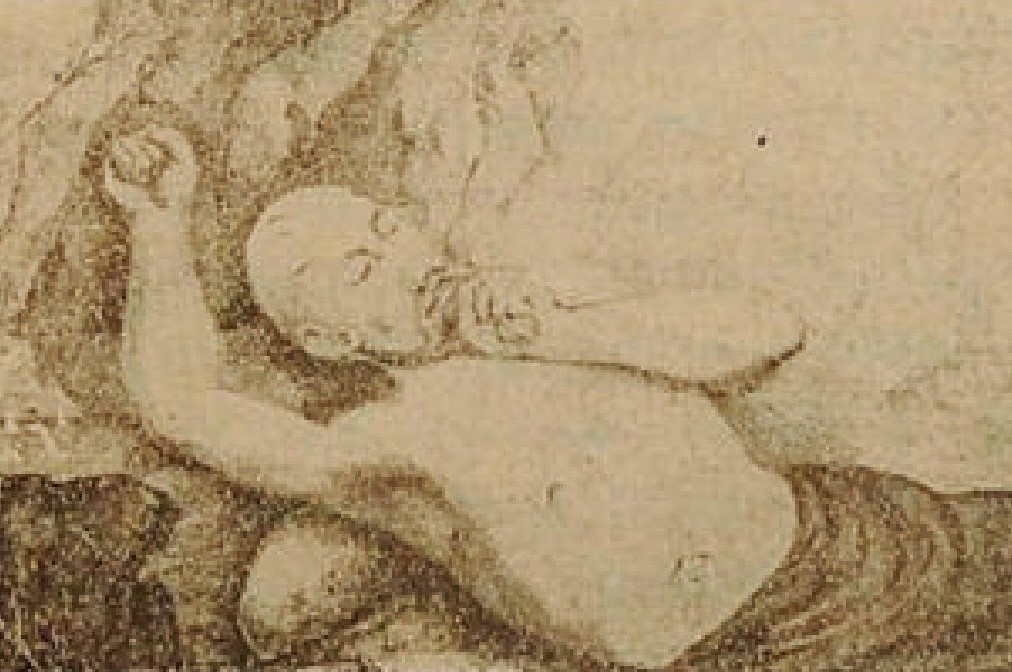
Lithograph of a drawing of a corpse, supposedly that of Ghazi Muhammad, 1832. Original drawing by Pavel A. Bestuzhev-Ryumin, a Russian artillery officer.

In the week following the battle, the Russian artillery officer Pavel Bestuzhev-Ryumin made a drawing of a half-naked corpse thought to be that of Ghazi Muhammad. This drawing was later lithographed in Tiflis. (Note: Patimat Takhnaeva considers it possible that the body depicted in the drawing was that of another person passed off as that of the imam. Additionally, she notes that Prushanovsky's subsequent description of the discovery of Ghazi Muhammad's body was probably based on the drawing by Bestuzhev-Ryumin.) K. Prushanovsky, a Russian officer in Dagestan writing in 1841, writes that "the dead body of Kazi-Mulla [Ghazi Muhammad] was found in such a position that he held his beard with one hand and pointed to the sky with the other." Prushanovsky further suggests that this left a great impression on the people, since it appeared as though Ghazi Muhammad was praying even in death; they began to repent for abandoning Ghazi Muhammad. The modern scholar Patimat Takhnaeva considers Prushanovsky's explanation "absurd". (Note: 19th-century German author Friedrich von Bodenstedt gives an account similar to that of Prushanovsky. He writes that Ghazi Muhammad's body was found "pierced by many bullets, in a position that filled the roughest warriors with awe and fear. With his left hand he had clasped his long, beautiful beard, with his right hand, stretched high, pointing towards the sky. His face bore the expression of such calm and serenity, as if he had not died in the turmoil of battle, but in the midst of a beautiful dream. Seeing that everything was lost, he had thrown himself on his knees in prayer and pointed to the east with his right hand when the killing bullet hit him." Bodenstadt claims that this left a deep impression on the Dagestanis.) The Russians took the imam's body to Tarku, the capital of the Kumyk shamkhal. The body was publicly displayed for a few days, then buried in the hills near the fortress of Burnaya. Later, during Shamil's rule, 200 horsemen were sent at night to exhume Ghazi Muhammad's remains and take them to Gimry. A shrine was built over his grave in Gimry, which has since become a pilgrimage site. Within a few days of his death, Ghazi Muhammad was succeeded as imam by his deputy Hamzat Bek.

== Writings ==
Ghazi Muhammad wrote a number of treatises of Islamic law, the most famous of which is Bahir al-burhan li-irtidad 'urafa' Daghistan (The clear evidence of the heresy of the elders who administer customary law in Dagestan). The Arabic prose version of this text has survived in manuscript form. There was also a rhymed version of the work, excerpts of which are quoted in two other Arabic-language Dagestani works: the chronicle of Muhammad Tahir al-Qarakhi, and Nadhir al-Durgili's biographical dictionary of Dagestani scholars. According to Kemper, this work was probably produced in about 1826 or 1827, possibly even earlier. In it, Ghazi Muhammad asserts that those who follow adat instead of sharia are unbelievers and alludes to his debates with other villagers on this issue, probably in his native Gimry. He makes no mention of jihad against the Russians, nor does he explicitly call for violence against the supporters of adat. Ghazi Muhammad also wrote a prose text in the Avar language with the Arabic title Risala fi al-kaba'ir bi-lisan Awar (Treatise on the great sins in the Avar language). Some later letters and epistles of Ghazi Muhammad are preserved, which generally deal with issues of Islamic law.

== Marriages and children ==
According to Hasanilaw, Ghazi Muhammad married for the first time when he was 15 years old, to a girl from Gimry named Shabay, but the marriage soon ended in divorce. He married another girl from his village in 1816, but the marriage did not last for more than a year, as he was constantly away from home for his studies. His third marriage was to a 13-year-old girl from Gimry named Patimat. He had one daughter with her named Salihat (his only child) in 1821–22; she died at the age of 15. His fourth and final marriage occurred in 1831, to Hapizat, the daughter of al-Yaraghi.
