= Memo bey Memayi =

Azerbaijani poet

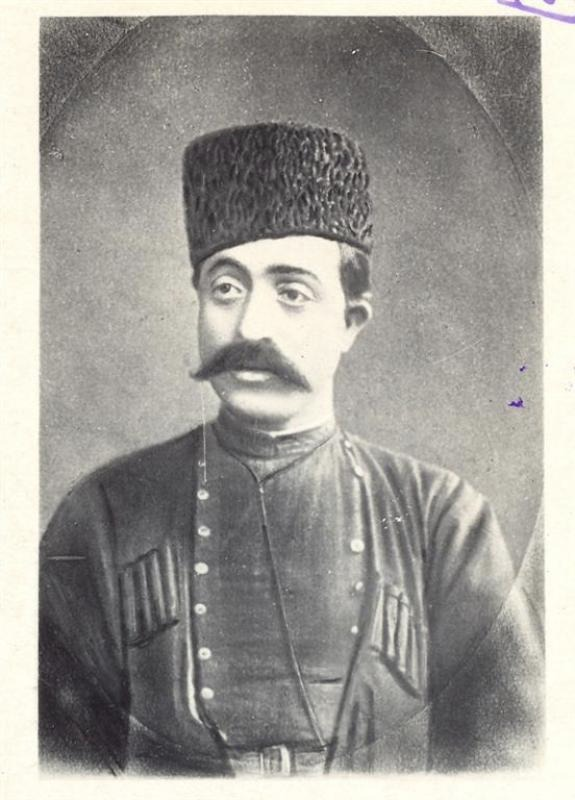
- A photo of Memo bey Memayi
- Native name: Memo bəy Məmai
- Born: 1849 Shusha, Russian Empire
- Died: 1918 (aged 68–69) Shusha, Russian Empire
- Occupation: Poet

Memo bey Memayi (Azerbaijani: Memo bəy Məmai; 1849–1918) was an Azerbaijani poet. He wrote under the pseudonym Memayi. He was a relative of Abdurrahim bey Hagverdiyev.

== Life ==
Memo bey Muhammed bey oglu Memayi was born in 1849 in Shusha in a noble family. As a child, they called him Memo, the nickname stuck with him later, already as a pseudonym. He received his education in Shusha, where he was engaged in trade. Memo bey Memai was one of the most active members of the association of poets "Mejlisi uns", headed by the famous poet Khurshidbanu Natavan. He loved to travel, and he visited many cities in Russia, Central Asia, Turkey, Iran. Later, all the impressions from the trips resulted in serious work, which he called the Book of Travels. Unfortunately, this book has not survived to this day. The father of five children, Memo bey gave his youngest daughter to be raised by his wife's brother, the famous playwright, Abdurrahim bey Hagverdiyev.

The poems of Memo-bek, written in the classical style of aruz in the Azerbaijani and Persian languages, have been preserved. Memo bey was a well-known calligrapher. Well-known calligraphic copies of his work by Natavan and other well-known Azerbaijani poets. At the present time they are kept at the Institute of Manuscripts of Azerbaijan.

The poet died in 1918 in Shusha, where he was buried.
