= Sarıcalı, Agdam =

Sarıcalı
- Municipality
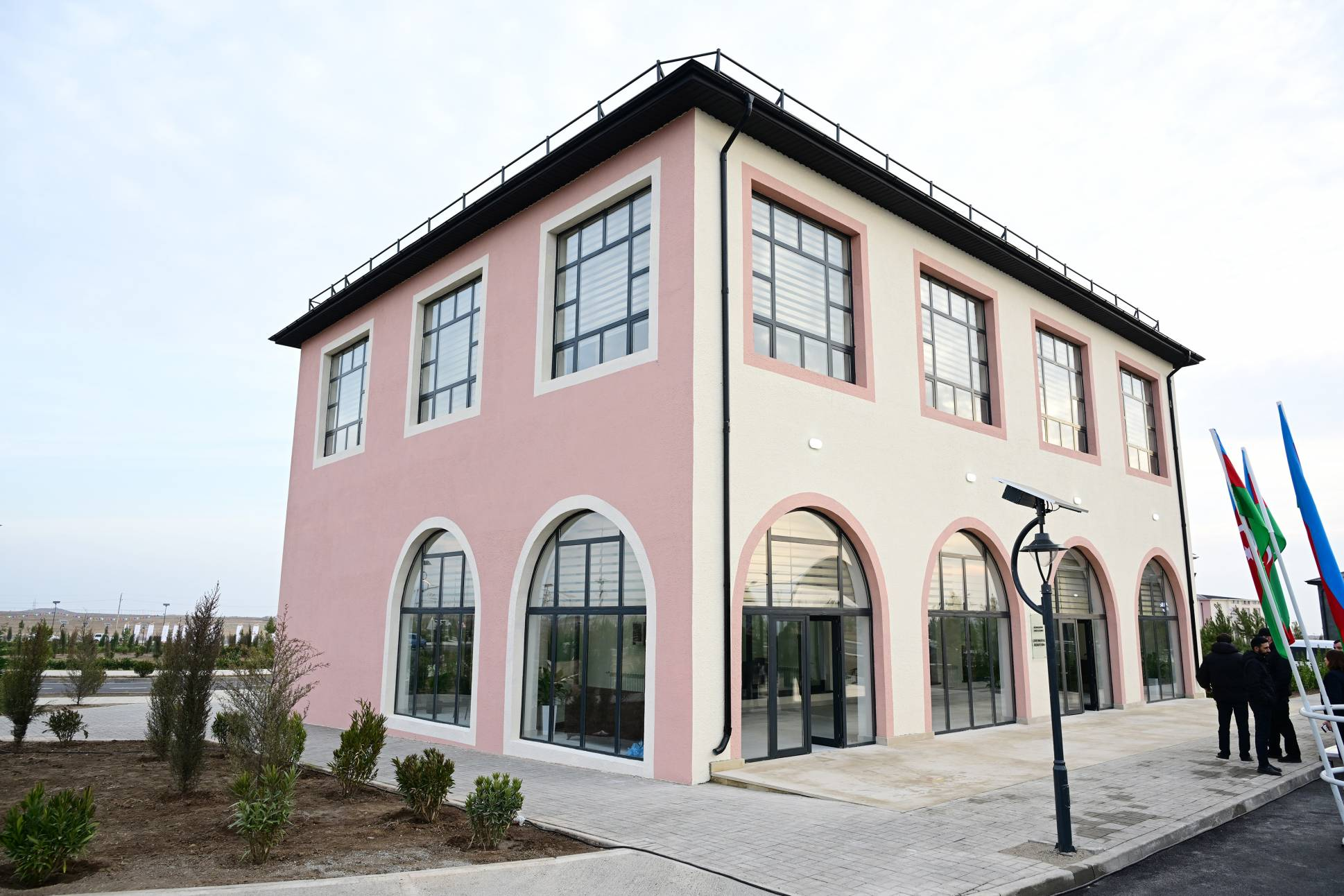

- Location within Azerbaijan Location within Karabakh Economic Region
- Coordinates: 40°00′N 46°57′E
- Country: Azerbaijan
- Rayon: Agdam

Population
  - Total: 1,848
- Time zone: UTC+4 (AZT)
  - Summer (DST): UTC+5 (AZT)

Sarıcalı (also, Indzhilli Sarydzhaly and Sarydzhaly) is a village and municipality in the Agdam Rayon of Azerbaijan. It has a population of 1,848.

== Restoration ==
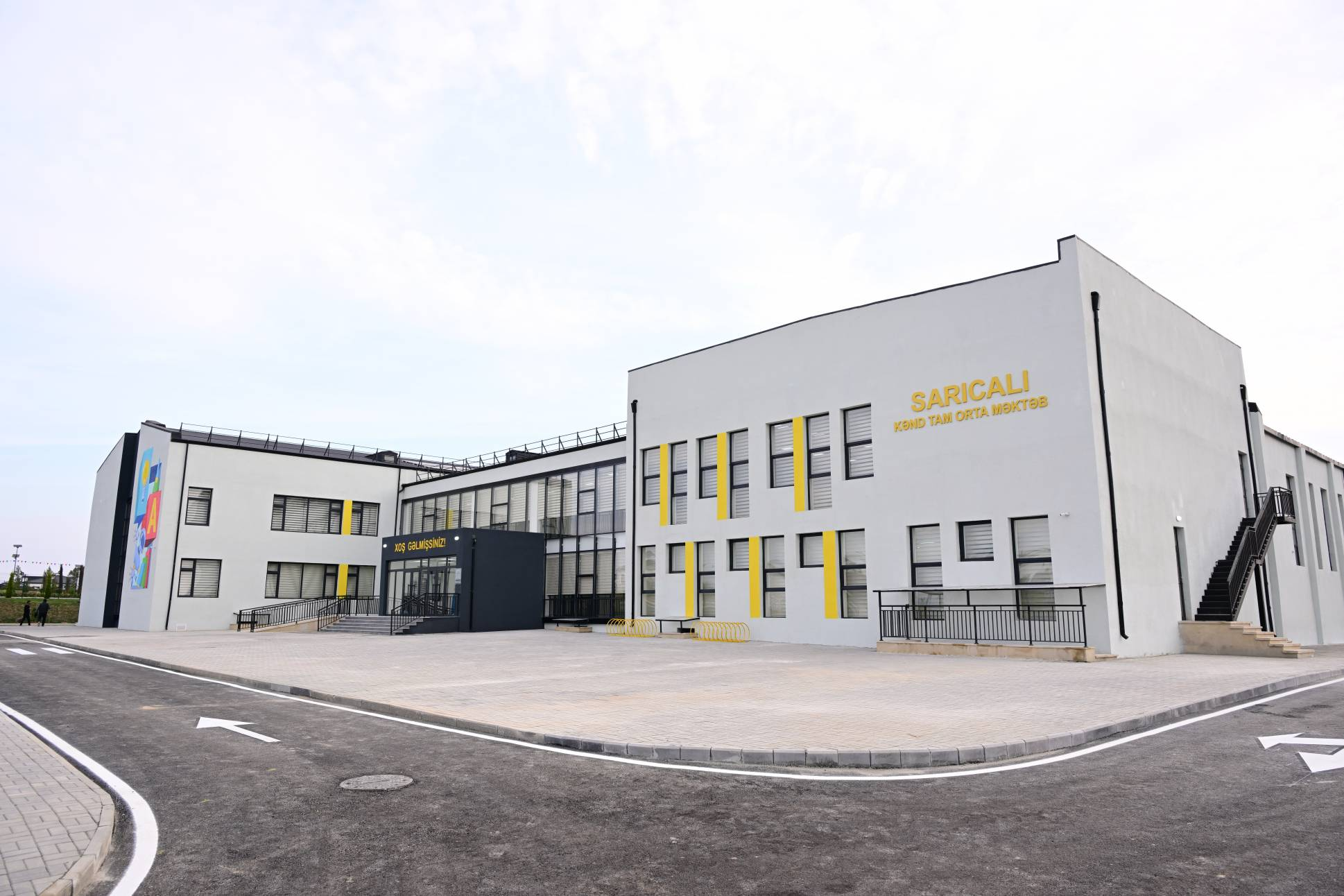
School

On March 27, 2025, President of the Republic of Azerbaijan Ilham Aliyev and First Lady Mehriban Aliyeva visited the village of Sarijali in the Aghdam district. They attended the inauguration ceremony of the first phase of the village’s restoration and handed over house keys to families who were resettled there.
