= Alexander Albrecht (general) =

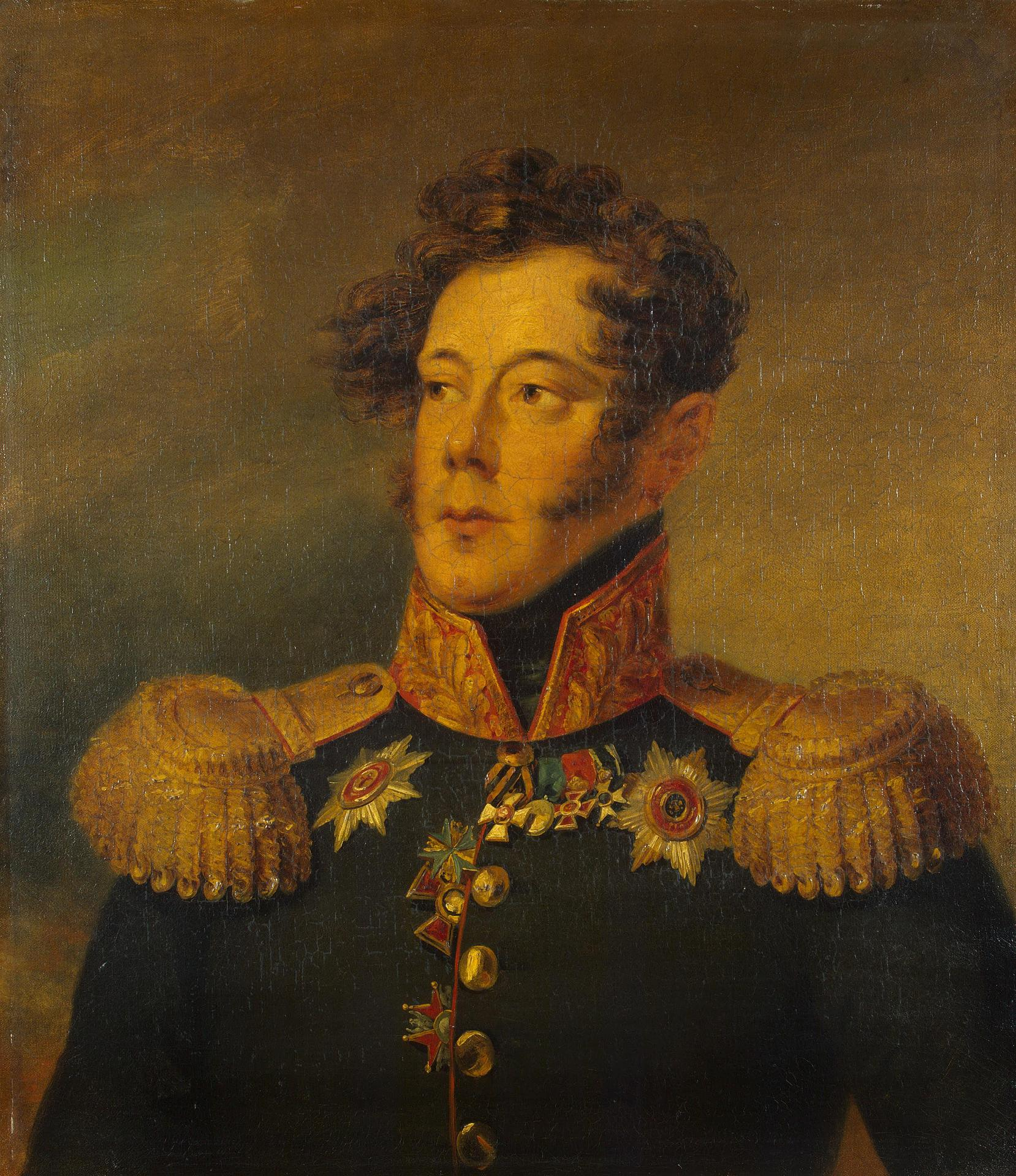
Portrait of Albrecht by George Dawe (Military Gallery, Hermitage)

Alexander Ivanovich Albrecht (Russian: Алекса́ндр Ива́нович А́льбрехт; 3 November 1788 – 15 August 1828) was a commander of the Imperial Russian Army during the French invasion of Russia.

== Life ==
He was from a Saint Petersburg noble family – his father was a colonel in the Semionovski Regiment. On 12 March 1803 he entered the army in a cavalry regiment. On 2 December 1805, at the rank of cornet, he was put in command of a squadron during the battle of Austerlitz before being wounded in the head and arm by a sabre and captured. In December 1809, promoted to captain, he was transferred into Her Imperial Highness the Grand Duchess Maria Pavlovna's Dragoon Regiment. On 11 October 1811 he was promoted to colonel.

In 1812 colonel Albrecht commanded a cavalry regiment formed from reserve dragoon, lancer and hussar squadrons. From 18 to 20 October 1812, during the Russian victory over the French and Bavarians at the Second Battle of Polotsk, his regiment seized 12 guns but he was wounded in his right hand. On 23 December 1812 he was awarded the Order of St. George 4th class. Albrecht also took an active part in harassing the Grande Armée during its crossing of the Berezina River. 1812 also saw him granted the Order of Leopold.

During the War of the Sixth Coalition, commanding a dragoon squadron, Albrecht distinguished himself in the battles of Lützen, Bautzen (where he was wounded in the right side) and Leipzig. He took part in several battles of the 1814 French campaign, including that at Fére-Champenoise, where his cavalry squadron contributed to the French defeat. On 10 May 1814 Albrecht was promoted to major general. 1814 also saw him awarded the Order of Saint Anne 1st class. On 10 May 1816 he was put in command of the 1st Brigade of the 3rd Cuirassier Division. During or after the war he was also awarded the Military Order of Maximilian Joseph of Bavaria 3rd class, the Order of Merit and the Order of St Stanislas.

In 1823, he was put in command of the Guards Cavalry in Poland. He died five years later, a victim of the plague that was ravaging central Europe at that time.
