= Ismayil bek Kutkashensky =

- İsmayıl bəy Qutqaşınlı
- Born: January 27, 1806; Qutqashen, Qutqashen Sultanate
- Died: August 26, 1861 (aged 55); Agdash, Baku Governorate, Russian Empire
- Occupations: Writer, Military commander
- Known for: Being first Azerbaijani to be decorated with Order of St. George
- Military career
- Allegiance: Imperial Russian Army
- Branch: Cavalry
- Service years: 1822–1852
- Rank: General-Major
- Conflicts: Russo-Persian War; Russo-Turkish War

Ismayil bek Kutkashensky (Russian: Исмаил-бек Куткашинский, Azerbaijani: İsmayıl bəy Qutqaşınlı) was Imperial Russian general of Azerbaijani background. In addition to being author of the first Azerbaijani literary work in French language, he is also known to be first Azerbaijani ever to be decorated with Order of St. George - the highest military decoration of the Russian Empire.

== Early life ==
He was born on 27 January 1806 in Lezgi family during Eid al-Adha for which he was named Ismayil after Ishmael who is believed in Islam to be near-sacrificed by his father Abraham. He was born to Nasrullah Sultan, the last Sultan of Qutqashen and Badirjahan Khanum; had 4 elder brothers named Agha, Huseyn, Abdullah and Yahya. After receiving basic education of Arabic and Persian languages, he was sent to study in First Cadet Corps in St. Petersburg and enrolled in military service in 14th Georgian Grenadier Regiment starting from 1822. On 17 August 1822, Ismail bek was promoted to podpraporshchik, and on 27 August 1824 to praporshchik.

== Russo-Persian War (1826–1828) ==
He participated in the defeat of the Persians at Shamkhor on 3 September 1826 and in the Battle of Elizabethpol on 13 September, later was promoted to podporuchik for the bravery in the battle on J28 January 1827. He participated in the siege and capture of the fortress of Abbasabad in July 1827, capture of the fortress of Sardarabad in September, Capture of Erivan from September 24 to 1 October 1827. Subsequently, he was awarded the Order of St. Anne (4th degree) with the inscription "for courage" for the battles against the Persians in 1827 on 25 January 1828. He was awarded the Persian Order of Leo and the Sun of the 3rd degree.

== Russo-Turkish War (1828–29) ==
He was also the participant of Russo-Turkish War of 1828–29. He took part in a campaign through the Soganlug Range and the defeating armies of Hakkı Pasha on 14 June 1829. He was further involved in the defeat of the main forces of Erzurum serasker on June 19, the occupation of the Hasankale fortress on June 23 and the occupation of Erzurum on June 24–27, 1829. The bravery in service brought him another promotion on 24 April 1829, this time to poruchik. He was awarded the Order of St. Anne of the 3rd degree with a bow.

== Later life ==
He was appointed as adjutant to decorated General Nikita Pankratiev on 20 November 1829. After 2 years, he would be transferred to the Pavlovsky Regiment. He served in the Transcaucasian Equestrian Muslim regiment in Warsaw during 1835-1836. By 6 December 1835 he was headquarters captain. In 1836 he was appointed to be under the commander of the Separate Caucasian Corps for special assignments under Georg Andreas von Rosen. He temporarily governed Karakaytag province (centered around modern Jinabi, Kaytagsky District) from 28 June to 30 September in 1837. His promotions would follow from 1839 to 1841, until when he was promoted to be a colonel.

He was involved in fixing the estate rights of the beys since 1848 as part of Shamakhi Provincial Commission. The commission was engaged in determining the land and personal rights of the upper Muslim nobility. Being a landed noble himself, he was interested in the prospects for the economic development, even drafted a “Note on the development of sericulture in the region” and tried to introduce new forms of production in his estate. In 1850 he was elected a full member of the Caucasian Society of Agriculture, and then the Caucasian Branch of the Russian Geographical Society - the first scientific institutions in the Caucasus.

He was promoted to General-Major of Cavalry at the Separate Caucasian Corps on 6 December 1850. He retired from military on 1 March 1852, after when he left for Hajj and toured Middle East.

== Personal life ==
After retirement he advocated for education of Muslims as he worked later as Russian language teacher at local Muslim school of Shamakhi for a while. He was married to Tuti Bika khanum, widow of Suleyman Pasha Tarkovsky - ruler of Shamkhalate of Tarki and sister of Khasay Khan Utsmiyev, both ethnic Kumyks. He died on 26 August 1861 in a caravanserai in Agdash. His body was brought back to Qutqashen and buried. His properties were inherited by Utsmiev family.

=== Literary activities ===
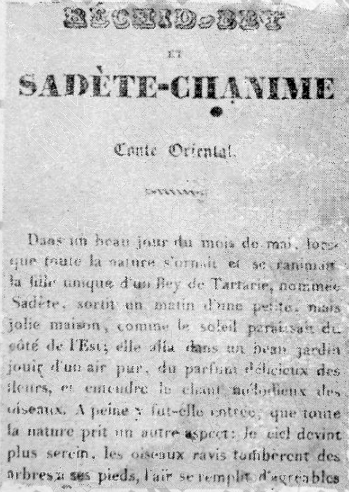
From the original French manuscript of "Rashid beg and Saadat khanum"

He authored at least two books - Safarnama and Rashid beg and Saadat khanum. Safarname is a travelogue depicting his travel to Middle East (Egypt, Beirut, Syria, Trabzon, etc.). Rashid beg and Saadat khanum (French: Réchid-Bey et Sadète-Chanime) is the first Azerbaijani literally work written in French language. A romantic story of fictional nobles Rashid beg (Shakikhanov) and Saadat khanum (Qutqashen princess) was first printed in Warsaw, 1835. He also wrote some poetry under pen name Miskin (Miserable) for a time. His other romantic story "Tutu" is lost. He was friends with other literary Azerbaijanis Abbasgulu agha Bakikhanov and Mirza Fatali Akhundov.

=== Legacy ===
There are streets in Qabala and Yasamal are named after him.

== Awards ==
- Order of St. Anne of the 4th class (1828)
- Order of the Lion and the Sun, 2nd class (1828)
- Order of St. Anne of the 3rd class with a bow (1830)
- Order of St. Vladimir 4th class with a bow (1831)
- Golden sword with the inscription "For courage" (1832)
- Order of St. Stanislav 3rd class (1832)
- Order of St. Anne of the 2nd class with the imperial crown (1839)
- Order of St. George 4th degree(December 4, 1843)
- Order of St. Vladimir 3rd class (1844)

== In popular media ==
- He was portrayed by Nazim Rza in TV film "Ismail Bey Gutgashenly" in 2004.
