= Starodubsky Uyezd =

Former administrative division

- Uezd of Russia
- 1781–1929
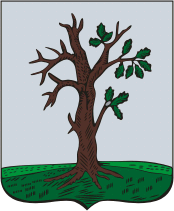
- Coat of arms

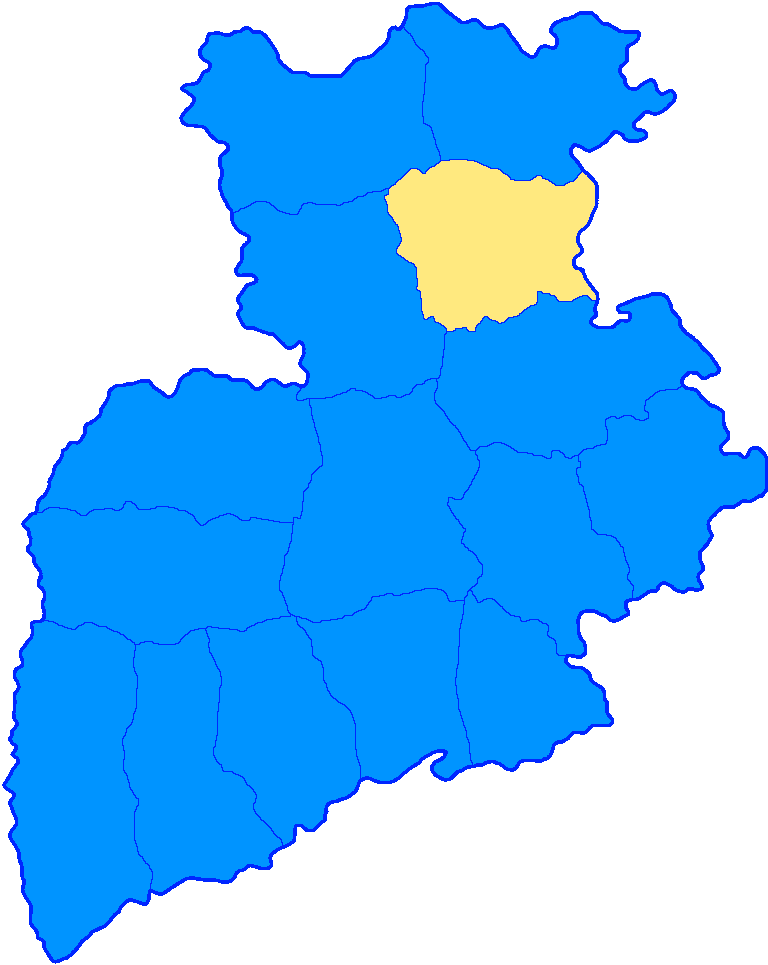
- Location in Chernihiv Governorate
- Capital: Starodub
- Population
  - 1897: 144,833
- History
  - Established: 1781
  - Disestablished: 1929
- Today part of: Russia

Starodubsky Uyezd (Стародубский уезд) or Starodub Povit (Ukrainian: Стародубський повіт, romanized: Starodubskyi povit) was one of the subdivisions of the Chernigov Governorate of the Russian Empire. It was situated in the northeastern part of the governorate. Its administrative centre was Starodub.

The governorate was incorporated into the Ukrainian SSR, and part of it including the Starodubsky Uyezd was transferred to the Gomel Oblast of the Russian SFSR in 1919.

The uyezd was considered part of the historic region of White Ruthenia.

== Demographics ==
At the time of the Russian Empire Census of 1897, Starodubsky Uyezd had a population of 144,833. Of these, 92.9% spoke Russian, 6.8% Yiddish, 0.2% Ukrainian and 0.1% Polish as their native language.
