= Jidir Plain =

Plain in Azerbaijan

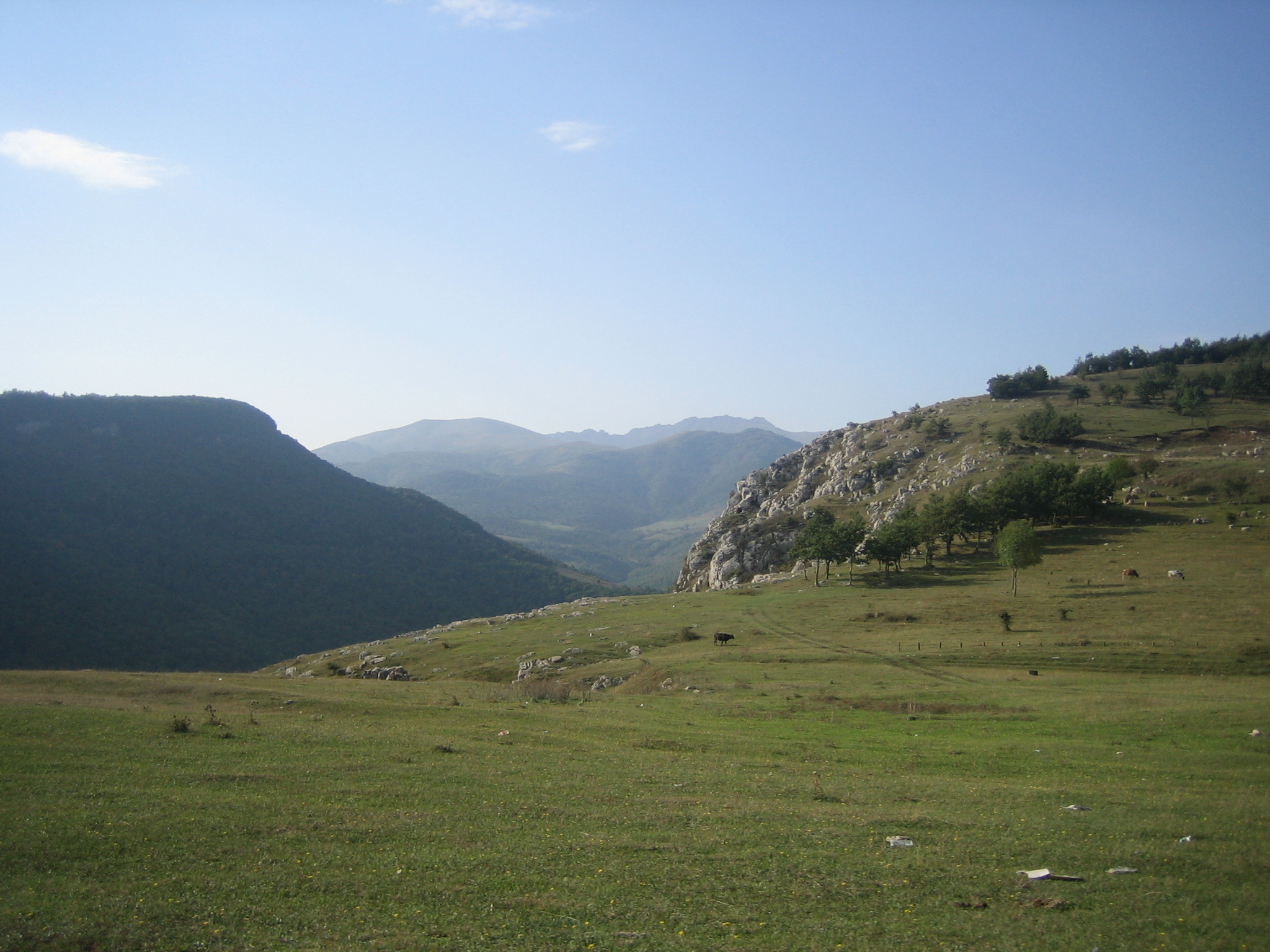
- The Jidir Plain overlooking the Dashalty Gorge
- Interactive map of Jidir Plain
- Location: Shusha, Azerbaijan

The Jidir Plain or Jydyr Plain (Azerbaijani: Cıdır düzü (Jidir Duzi), Armenian: Կատարոտ (Katarot)) is a plain in the southern part of Shusha, Azerbaijan.

== Location ==
The western part of Shusha rises 1,800 meters and the eastern part 1,400 meters above sea level. The Jidir Plain is located in the southern relatively flat yet higher part of Shusha. This meadow overlooks the valley and the Dashalty gorge through which the Dashalty river flows 200 meters below. A trail on the edge of the Jidir Plain leads to Girkh Pillakan (40 steps), a forty step path which in turn leads down to the Dashalty gorge and Khazina Galasy ("Treasure Castle") cave by the river.

== Significance ==
The Jidir Plain has always been the main location for festivities and sporting events in Shusha. From the time of Shusha's establishment, wrestling matches were part of periodic competitions held by the Karabakh Khans. Both horse racing and camel racing matches were held here. Chovgan (Middle Eastern variation of polo) was also played here. Participants of the games also excelled in jigitovka, a type of horse riding stunt games. Ibrahim Khalil Khan who was fond of Karabakh horses, held official semi-annual horse racing games in the khanate while the regular races took place on a weekly basis. Youth received awards for exceptional horse riding stunts. One of the variations of the Jidir Plain jigitovka was baharbandi where the participants had to throw off their papakh, rifle, dagger, shashka at assigned spots at full speed and then collect them on their way back with the same speed. The Jidir Plain was also a place for Novruz celebrations as well as official welcoming ceremonies for international guests. The festivities included tightrope walking, stilts and jester performances accompanied by music. The field was often compared to a hippodrome.
