= Abdullah bey Asi =

Azerbaijani poet

- Born: 1841 Shusha, Elisabethpol Governorate, Russian Empire
- Died: 1874 (aged 32–33) Shusha, Shushinsky Uyezd, Elisabethpol Governorate, Russian Empire
- Occupation: Poet

Abdullah bey Asi (Azerbaijani: Abdulla bəy Asi; 1836–1885) was an Azerbaijani poet. He wrote under the pseudonym Asi.

== Life ==
Abdulla bey Alibek oglu Asi (Fuladov) was born in 1841 in Shusha. He was the brother of Abdullah bey Asi, the grandson of the poet Gasim bey Zakir. He grew up under the protection of Gasim bey Zakir. Gasim bey Zakir is a descendant of Karabakh khans. He received his primary education from a local mullah, then continued his studies at a madrasah at Shusha. He was fluent in Persian, Arabian and Russian. He learned the Chagatai language by reading Ali-Shir Nava'i's works and wrote several ghazals in that language. He began to write poetry very early in these three (Azerbaijani, Persian and Chagatai) languages.

He wrote poems under the pseudonym Asi. He was well acquainted with Russian literature. Abdulla bey is also known in Azerbaijani literature as the organizer and leader of the Beiti-Khamushan (House of the Silent) poets' circle. This circle was known for its original correspondence with another circle of poets, Beiti-Safa (House of Joy), in which the clergy and beks (nobility) were ridiculed in poetic form. He was close friends of Seyid Azim Shirvani.

His ghazals of classical literature, which flourished at that time, received new content from Asia, directed against the clergy. Most of his creations have been lost, only a small part of them (mostly Qasidas and Marsiyas) have survived to this day. His poetic samples were first published in the second part of the collection "Azerbaijani Literature" edited by Firidun bey Kocharli.

The poet died in 1874 in Shusha.

== See also ==
- Abdulla Pasha Janizade
