= Agachkala, Republic of Dagestan =

Agachkala Агачкала
- Selo
- Location within Republic of Dagestan Location within Russia
- Coordinates: 42°46′N 47°04′E
- Country: Russia
- Region: Republic of Dagestan
- District: Buynaksky District
- Time zone: UTC+3:00

Agachkala (Russian: Агачкала) is a rural locality (a selo) in Verkhnekazanishchensky Selsoviet, Buynaksky District, Republic of Dagestan, Russia. As of 2010, the population was 450. There are 9 streets.

== Geography ==
Agachkala is located 9 km southwest of Buynaksk (the district's administrative centre) by road, on the left bank of the Akleozen River. Manasaul is the nearest rural locality.
