= Mir Mohsun Navvab =

Mir Möhsün Nəvvab
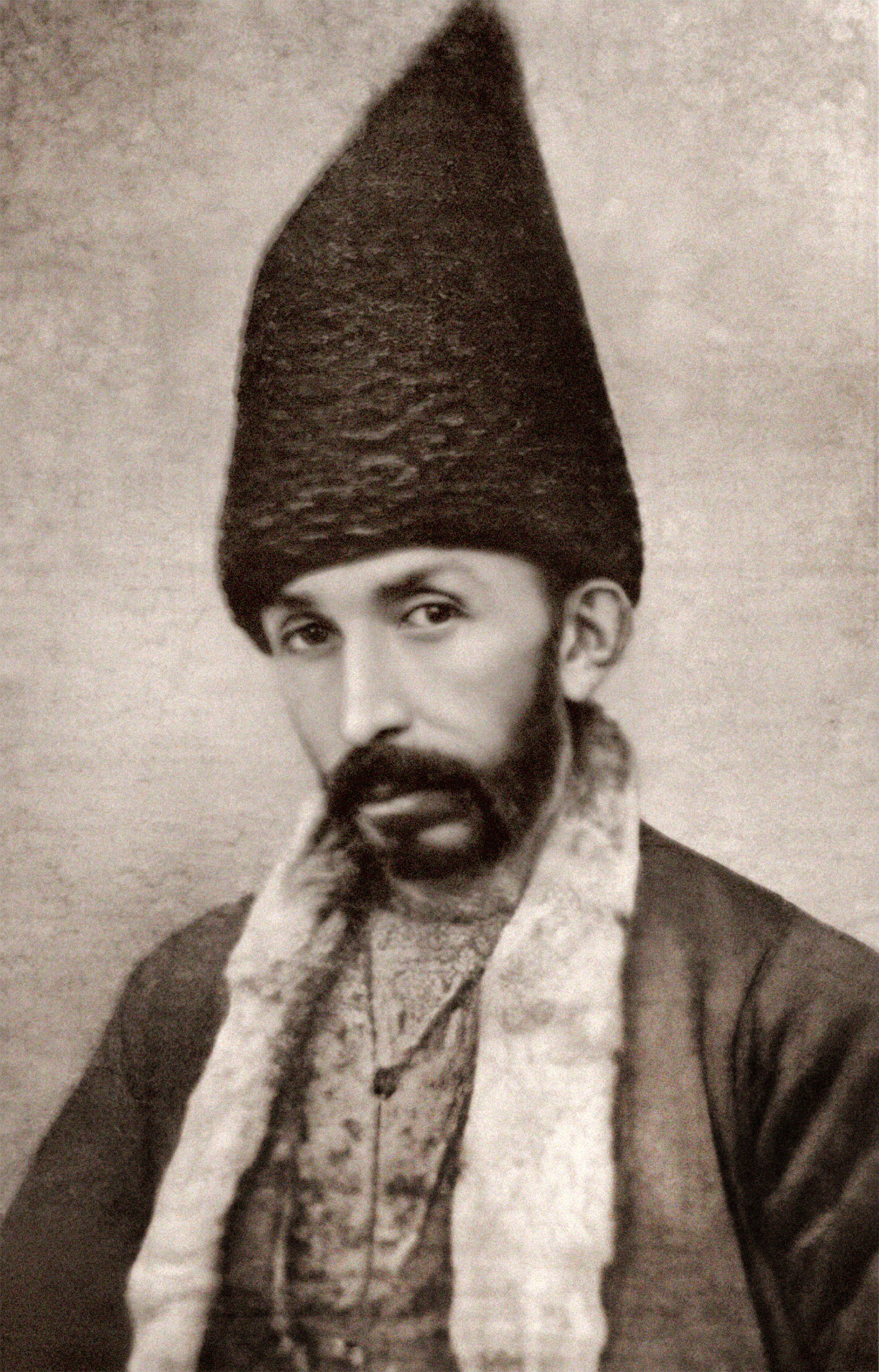
- Mir Mohsun Navvab during work
- Born: 1833; Shusha, Karabakh province, Russian Empire
- Died: 1918 (aged 84–85); Shusha, Transcaucasian Democratic Federative Republic
- Writing career
- Genres: Lyric poetry, Calligraphy, Painter

Mir-Mohsun Navvab (Azerbaijani: Mir Möhsün Nəvvab) (1833–1918 in Shusha, present day Azerbaijan) occupies a prominent place in the history of Azerbaijani culture as the last representative of the old traditional school of science, arts and literature. Navvab was a versatile person of his time. He is known as a poet, artist, music historian, astronomer, carpenter, chemist and mathematician.

Navvab was born in 1833 in Shusha and spent his life in this city. His life and works reflect a period of history when Azerbaijan was at the turning point between the old and the new, traditional and novel trends in culture and the general way of life. Although Navvab remained a traditionalist in the arts, he was a progressive person in public life in Karabakh who did a lot for the growth of literacy, culture, and arts in Karabakh.

Navvab was a famous calligrapher in Shusha. He published the poems of Karabakh poets and distributed them among the local population. Navvab established a second literary society in Azerbaijan called the Majlis-i Faramushan "Society of the Forgotten" and the first music society, Majlis-i Khanende "Society of Singers".

Navvab wrote more than 20 books dedicated to various fields of science and arts. He is the author of the Vuzuh al-Argam "Explanation of the numbers", a significant work which offers 82 maqams (an original improvisational classical folk music popular in Azerbaijan) and songs performed in Karabakh at that time. He also provides information about the origins of these maqams and the rules for their performance. Navvab is also the author of the book Tezkirey-i-Navvab, which gives information about one hundred poets and writers of Karabakh at the time.

He also authored an eyewitness account of Armenian–Tatar massacres of 1905–1906 titled Tavārīkh-i razm u shūrish-i ṭāʾifa-yi arāmana bā musalmānān-i Qafqāz "The chronicle of battles and riots of the Armenian people against the Muslims of the Caucasus" around 1906. He identified Armenian nationalists as the main source of trouble for both sides, nevertheless mostly blaming the Social Democrat Hunchakian Party.

Navvab was also a talented artist. He illustrated his manuscripts with colorful pictures and portraits and also decorated the interiors of the buildings with various ornaments. Before the 1992 Battle of Shusha, some of these wall decorations were preserved in the house where he lived, the school where he taught, and the minarets of the Shusha's Yukhari Govhar Agha Mosque. Navvab died in 1918 in Shusha fortress.

== See also ==
- Gravestone of Mir Mohsun Navvab
