= Nikita Pankratiev =

Imperial Russian general-lieutenant (1788–1836)

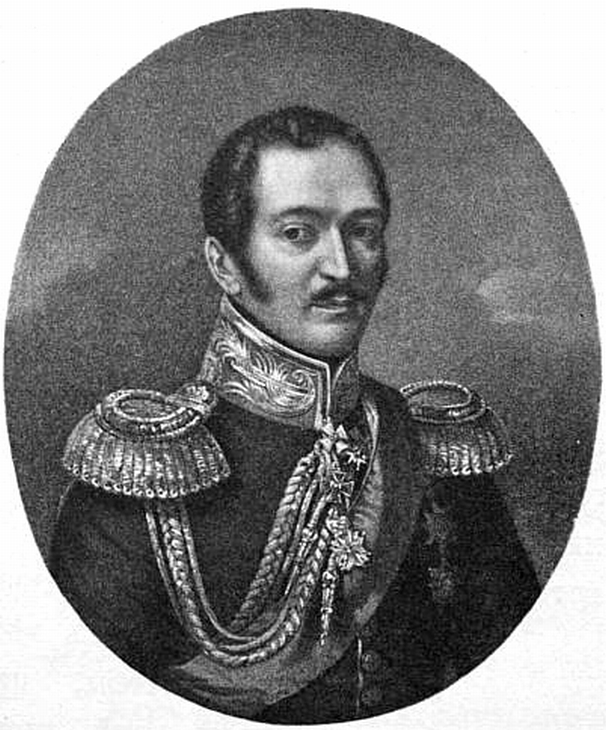
General Nikita Pankratyev

Nikita Petrovich Pankratyev (Russian: Никита Петрович Панкратьев; 1788–1836) was an Imperial Russian lieutenant general (1829).

== Biography ==
Born of a Russian noble family from the Kiev Governorate, Pankratiev joined the Russian army in 1807 during the Russo-Turkish War. He served as an aide to Field Marshal Mikhail Kutuzov during the French invasion of Russia in 1812 and to the tsar Alexander I of Russia during the War of the Sixth Coalition of 1813–1814. He rose to a regimental commander during the War of the Seventh Coalition in 1815 and was promoted to major-general in 1817. He fought in the Caucasus in the wars with Persia, Turkey, and Caucasian mountaineers in the 1820s. He led a punitive expedition against the South Ossetians in 1830 and briefly commanded the Russian troops in the South Caucasus in 1831. He was appointed member of the State Council of the Kingdom of Poland in 1832 and Governor General of Warsaw in 1833. He presided over the court martial of the Polish officers who took part in the Polish November Uprising of 1830–31.
