= Act of oath of six Ingush clans to Russia =

Treaty between six Ingush clans and Russia

- Type: Pact
- Signed: August 22, 1810
- Location: Vladikavkaz
- Signatories: Russian Empire; (Ingushetia) Nazranians
- Languages: Russian

The Act of Oath of Six Ingush Clans to Russia (Russian: Акт присяги шести ингушских фамилий России, romanized: Akt prisyagi shesti ingushkikh familii Rossii) was a treaty between representatives of six major Ingush clans (teips) and the Russian Empire. It was signed on August 22, 1810 in the city of Vladikavkaz. Due to this oath, the Ingush were given the right to resettle the land along the right bank of the Terek up to the ridge. The majority of the Ingush, in particular the mountain Ingush societies, did not enter into the treaty and did not consider themselves Russian subjects.

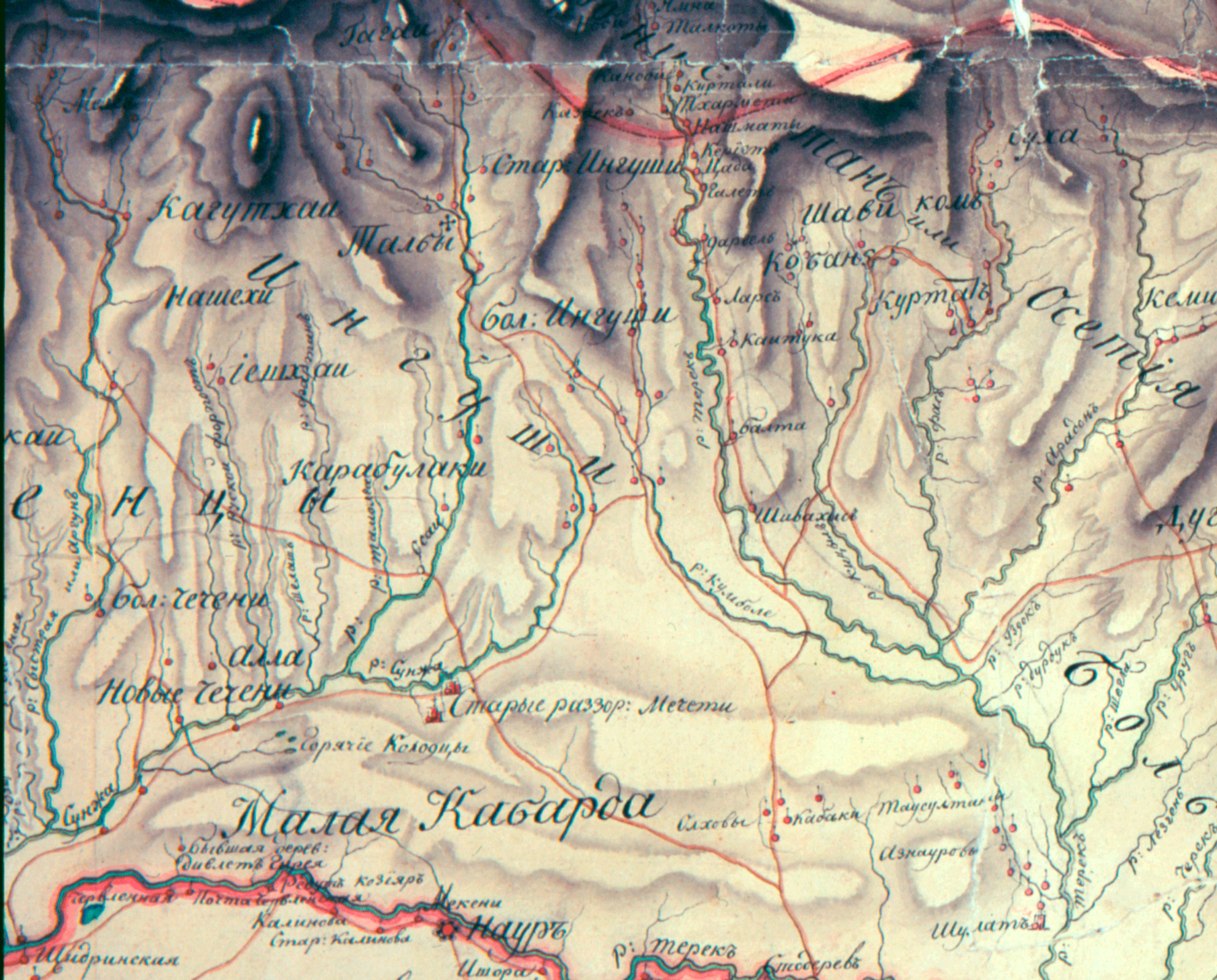
Fragment of the map of the Astrakhan province, the Caucasian line and the mountain peoples of 1799

== History ==
First diplomatic relationships between the Ingush and the Russian Empire were achieved in 1770, when 24 elders of 24 villages took the oath to join Russia near the village of Angusht between the 4 and 6 March. The location of this event, the village Angusht, is the namesake of the Ingush people, who in Russian reports of the first half of the 18th century became known as Angushtins, Angushi, or Ingushi. Johann Anton Güldenstädt, who was present during the events of March 1770, wrote that they were known as "Kisti" and "Ingushi", but called themselves "Galga".

On 8 January 1811, representatives of thirteen villages of the Kistin (Feappii) society arrived in Vladikavkaz and swore allegiance to the Russian emperor. The oath was administered by Major General Ivan Delpozzo, the commandant of Vladikavkaz, through the mediation of Lieutenant Colonel Kazbegi. As a guarantee of their allegiance, hostages (amanats) were taken and held in Vladikavkaz. The thirteen villages included Arzi, Tarsh, Metskhal, Falkhan and Beyni, among others. Among the families represented were the Yandievs, Gudantovs, Kushtov, Tochievs, Yaryzhevs, Khutievs and Kotsievs.

Despite these oaths, relations between the Ingush societies and the Russian Empire remained largely unchanged. In fact, both sides regarded such oaths as agreements establishing alliances rather than complete political submission. During the Caucasian War, Ingush communities resisted against the tsarist government, and participated in uprisings and armed clashes aginst the Russians. On the side of the Caucasian Imamate, the Ingush from the societies of Karabulaks and Galashians also fought.

Granat Encyclopedic Dictionary states that the Ingush despite being nominally under Russian rule, remained effectively independent for a considerable period and repeatedly fought against the Russians.

== Involved parties ==
General Delpozzo, the commander of the Vladikavkaz fortress, represented the Russian Empire while the influential Ingush clans were represented by ten elders from the six major teips, which were the Targimkhoi, Khamkhoi, Ozdoi, Egikhoi, Kartoi and Yovloy.

== Content of the oath ==
With the oath, the clans obliged themselves to fulfill several duties. These duties included the task to deploy fully equipped detachments of at least 1000 people to fight the enemies of Russia (mentioned by name are the Chechens and Karabulaks), report attacks on fortresses, transfer representatives of hostile groups to the Russian authorities and ensure the unhindered passage of Russian troops through villages. If these obligations were violated, those responsible would be declared traitors and rebels and treated as enemies by the Russian command.

== Bibliography ==
- Долгиева, М. Б.; Картоев, М. М.; Кодзоев, Н. Д.; Матиев, Т. Х. (2013). Кодзоев, Н. Д. (ed.). История Ингушетии [History of Ingushetia] (4th ed.). Ростов-на-Дону: Южный издательский дом. pp. 1–600. ISBN 978-5-98864-056-1.
- Максимов, А. М. (1914). "Ингуши" [The Ingush]. In Гамбаров, Ю. С.; Железнов, В. Я.; Ковалевскій, М. М.; Муромцев, С. А.; Тимирязев, К. А. (eds.). Энциклопедическій словарь Гранатъ (in Russian). Vol. 21: Звукъ — Индія (7th ed.). Москва: Издательство Т-ва „Бр. А. и И. Гранатъ и К°“. p. 609 – via Wikisource.
- Кодзоев, Н. Д. (2002). История ингушского народа. Глава 5. ГЛАВА 5 ИНГУШЕТИЯ В XIX В. § 1. Ингушетия в первой половине XIX в. Основание Назрани [History of the Ingush people. Chapter 5. CHAPTER 5 INGUSHETIA IN THE XIX CENTURY § 1. Ingushetia in the first half of the XIX century. Foundation of Nazran] (in Russian). Archived from the original on 2019-07-23.
- Грабовский, Н. Ф. (1876). Сборник сведений о кавказских горцах [Collection of information about the Caucasian highlanders] (in Russian). Vol. 9. Тифлис.
- Гюльденштедт, И. А. (1809). Географическое и статистическое описание Грузии и Кавказа из Путешествия г-на академика И.А. Гильденштедта через Россию и по Кавказским горам, в 1770, 1771, 1772 и 1773 годах. Санкт-Петербург.
- Гаджиев, В. Г.; Османов, А. И. (1998). Кавказская война: спорные вопросы и новые подходы. Тезисы докладов Международной научной конференции [The Caucasian War: Controversial Issues and New Approaches. Theses of the Reports of the International Scientific Conference] (in Russian). Makhachkala: ИИАЭ ДФИЦ РАН.
