= Galashki =

Rural locality in Ingushetia

Galashki Галашки
- Selo

Other transcription(s)
  - Ingush: Галашке (Note: • Commonly mentioned as 'Galashke' (Ingush: Галашке); however, the village was sometimes mentioned as 'Galashka' (Ingush: Галашка) or 'Galashkie' (Ingush: Галашке).)
- Interactive map of Galashki
- Location of Galashki Galashki (Republic of Ingushetia)
- Coordinates: 43°05′16″N 44°59′09″E
- Country: Russia
- Federal subject: Ingushetia
- Mentioned: 1773
- Elevation: 551 m (1,808 ft)

Population (2010 Census)
  - Total: 6,662
  - Estimate (2021): 7,285 (+9.4%)

Administrative status
  - Subordinated to: Sunzhensky District
- Time zone: UTC+3 (MSK)
- Postal code: 386255
- OKTMO ID: 26610425101

Galashki (Note: /ɡəˈlæʃki/ gə-LASH-kee; Ingush: Галашке, romanized: Galaşke, IPA: [ˈgɑɫəʃkʲe]; Russian: Галашки) is a rural locality (a selo) in Sunzhensky District of the Republic of Ingushetia, Russia, located on the left bank of the Sunzha River near the border with the Republic of North Ossetia–Alania. Its population was about 9,000 people in 2009. Galashki forms the municipality of the rural settlement of Galashki as the only settlement in its composition.

== Etymology ==
Some researchers translate the name of the village of Galashki from the Ingush language as "to the Galais", based on the assertion that the representatives of the Galai clan (teip) are the founders of the village.

== Geography ==
Galashki is situated on the left bank of the Assa River, approximately 30 kilometers southwest of the regional center, Sunzha, and 32 kilometers southeast of the city of Magas (by road). The nearest settlements to Galashki are the village of Alkhasty to the north, the village of Dattykh to the northeast, the village of Muzhichi to the south, and the village of Komgaron to the southwest.

== History ==
The village was founded by the clan (teip) of Galai who migrated from Galanchozh. In the second half of the 18th century (1770s), the German researcher J. A. Güldenstädt indicated Galashki among the total number of Ingush villages and districts. Galashki as Ingush village was mentioned by S. M. Bronevsky in 1823. Ten years later, I. F. Blaramberg indicated Galashki as Ingush village too in his fundamental work “Historical, topographical, statistical, ethnographic and military description of the Caucasus”, written in 1834 as a result of his business trip and expedition in the Caucasus. Gradually by the name of the village in the 19th century, in official and literary sources, the terms "Galashian society" and "Galashians" are fixed, as one of the territorial societies of the Ingush.

The village was considered a large village in the foothills in the Caucasian Imamate and played an important strategic role, as it closed the exits from the mountains to the plain. During the existence of Caucasian Imamate, Galashki was the center of a separate Galashkinskoe naibstvo, which was ruled by naib Dudarov, and also Muhammad-Mirza Anzorov.

It was a site of two raids by Chechen separatists during the Second Chechen War, the Galashki ambush in 2000 (from Chechnya) and the Battle of Galashki in 2002 (from Georgia).

== Notable people ==
- Laysat Baysarova (1920 – 2005), an Ingush abrek and insurgent.
- Ruslan Khuchbarov (1972 – 2004), an Ingush militant notorious for his leading role in the Beslan school hostage crisis.
- Shirvani Kostoev (1923 – 1949), an Ingush pilot and flight commander.

== See also ==
- Galashians
- Galashkinskoe Naibstvo

== Bibliography ==
=== English sources ===
- Cohen, S. B., ed. (2008). The Columbia Gazetteer of the World. Vol. 1: A to G (2nd ed.). New York City: Columbia University Press. pp. 1–4390. ISBN 978-0-231-14554-1.
- Myers, Steven Lee (September 27, 2002). "Dozens Killed as Russian Forces Battle Chechen Fighters". The New York Times.

=== Russian sources ===
- Барахоева, Н. М.; Кодзоев, Н. Д.; Хайров, Б. А. (2016). Ингушско-русский словарь терминов [Ingush-Russian dictionary of terms] (in Ingush and Russian) (2 ed.). Нальчик: ООО «Тетраграф». pp. 1–288.
- Бларамберг, И. Ф. (2010). Историческое, топографическое, статистическое, этнографическое и военное описание Кавказа [Historical, topographical, statistical, ethnographic and military description of the Caucasus] (field research) (in Russian). Translated by Назарова, И. М. Москва: Издательство Надыршин. pp. 1–402. ISBN 978-5-902744-10-8.
- Броневскій, С. М. (1823). "Кисты (глава третья)" [Kists (chapter three)]. Новѣйшія географическія и историческія извѣстія о Кавказѣ (часть вторая) [The latest geographical and historical news about the Caucasus (part two)] (PDF) (in Russian). Москва: Типографія С. Селивановскаго. pp. 151–186.
- Генко, А. Н. (1930). "Из культурного прошлого ингушей" [From the cultural past of the Ingush]. Записки коллегии востоковедов при Азиатском музее [Notes of the College of Orientalists at the Asian Museum] (in Russian). Vol. 5. Ленинград: Издательство Академии наук СССР. pp. 681–761.
- Гюльденштедт, Иоганн Антон (2002). "VI. Провинция Кистия, или Кистетия" [VI. Province of Kistia, or Kistetia]. In Карпов, Ю. Ю. (ed.). Путешествие по Кавказу в 1770-1773 гг. [Journey through the Caucasus in 1770-1773.] (in Russian). Translated by Шафроновской, Т. К. Санкт-Петербург: Петербургское Востоковедение. pp. 238–243. ISBN 5-85803-213-3.
- Дмитриевский, С. М. (2009). Международный трибунал для Чечни: правовые перспективы привлечения к индивидуальной уголовной ответственности лиц, подозреваемых в совершении военных преступлений и преступлений против человечности в ходе вооруженного конфликта в Чеченской Республике [International Tribunal for Chechnya: Legal Perspectives on Individual Criminal Responsibility of Persons Suspected of Committing War Crimes and Crimes against Humanity in the Course of the Armed Conflict in the Chechen Republic] (in Russian). Vol. 1. Новгрод: Нижегородский фонд в поддержку толерантности.
- Долгиева, М. Б.; Картоев, М. М.; Кодзоев, Н. Д.; Матиев, Т. Х. (2013). Кодзоев, Н. Д. (ed.). История Ингушетии [History of Ingushetia] (4th ed.). Ростов-на-Дону: Южный издательский дом. pp. 1–600. ISBN 978-5-98864-056-1.
- Кодзоев, Н. Д. (2021). Хайрова, Р. Р. (ed.). Русско-ингушский словарь [Russian-Ingush dictionary] (in Ingush and Russian). Ростов-на-Дону: Типография «Лаки Пак». pp. 1–656. ISBN 978-5-906785-55-8.
- Крупнов, Е. И. (1971). Средневековая Ингушетия [Medieval Ingushetia] (in Russian). Москва: Наука. pp. 1–211.
- Куркиев, А. С. (1979). Основные вопросы лексикологии ингушского языка [The main questions of the lexicology of the Ingush language] (in Russian). Грозный: Чеч.-Инг. кн. изд-во. pp. 1–254.
- Куркиев, А. (2002). "О некоторых топонимических названиях плоскостной Ингушетии" [About some toponymic names of planar Ingushetia]. Литературная Ингушетия (in Russian) (2): 102–108.
- Мальсагов, З. К. (1963). Оздоева, Ф. (ed.). Грамматика ингушского языка [Grammar of the Ingush language] (in Ingush and Russian). Vol. 5 (2nd ed.). Грозный: Чечено-Ингушское Книжное Издательство. pp. 1–164.
- Марковин, В. И. (1969). Куратова, И. А. (ed.). В стране вайнахов [In the land of the Vainakhs] (in Russian). Москва: Искусство. pp. 1–120.
- Мужухоев, М. Б. (March 1994). "Расселение орстхойцев на плоскости в позднем средневековье и в XVIII—XIX веках" [Settlement of the Orstkhois on the Flat in the Late Middle Ages and in the 18th to 19th Centuries]. Орстхо (in Russian). Vol. 10, no. 26.
- Мухаммад-Амин (c. 1848). "Письмо Мухаммадамина к жителям Калая и Арашди" [Muhammadamin's letter to the inhabitants of Kalay and Arashdy]. www.vostlit.info (in Russian).
- Мурдалов, Муслим (2018). Чеченцы: быт, культура, нравы, обычаи, религия. Кавказская война. XIX век [Chechens: way of life, culture, customs, customs, religion. Caucasian war. 19th century] (in Russian). Litres. ISBN 978-5-04-137139-5.
- Оздоев, И. А. (1980). Оздоева, Ф. Г.; Куркиев, А. С. (eds.). Русско-ингушский словарь: 40 000 слов [Russian-Ingush dictionary: 40,000 words] (in Ingush and Russian). Москва: Русский язык. pp. 1–832.
- Ужахов, М. Г. (1927). Ингушско-русский словарик [Ingush-Russian dictionary] (in Ingush and Russian). Владикавказ: Крайнациздат. pp. 1–185.
- Твёрдый, А. В. (2008). Макаренко, Ю. Г. (ed.). Кавказ в именах, названиях, легендах: опыт топонимического словаря [Caucasus in names, titles, legends: Toponymic Dictionary Experience] (in Russian). Краснодар: Платонов И. pp. 1–432. ISBN 978-5-89564-044-9.
- Николаи, А. П. (1891). Бартенев, П. И. (ed.). "Из воспоминаній о моей жизни: Салтинскій походъ 1842 года" [From memories of my life: Saltin campaign of 1842]. Русскій архивъ (in Russian). No. 6. Moscow: Университетская типографія. pp. 133–153 (201–221 as PDF).
- Дагестанский филиал АН СССР (1989). Народно-освободительное движение горцев Дагестана и Чечни в 20-50-х годах XIX в: Всесоюзная научная конференция, 20-22 июня 1989 г.: тезисы докладов и сообщений [The people's liberation movement of the highlanders of Dagestan and Chechnya in the 20-50s of the XIX century: All-Union Scientific Conference, June 20–22, 1989: abstracts of reports and messages]. Makhachkala: Дагестанский филиал АН СССР. pp. 1–190.
