= Arsiko-Makhamaz-ogly =

Kistin naib of Mountainous Chechnya

- Born: 19th century
- Died: 19th century
- Allegiance: Caucasian Imamate
- Service / branch: Army
- Rank: Naib
- Battles / wars: Caucasian War

Arsiko-Makhamaz-ogly (Note: Chechen: Махьмазан Арсанаькъа, romanized: Mæx́mæzan Arsanäqha; Ingush: Махьма Оарсанокъо, romanized: Mæx́mæ Oarsanoqho) was the Kistin naib of Imam Shamil who served as the governor of the District of Mountainous Chechnya of North Caucasian Imamate during the Caucasian War. Arsiko was also referred as the Kistin Naib (Кистинский Наиб). According to historian Yu. U. Dadayev, he was among the brave and faithful naibs of Shamil alongside Muhammad-Mirza Anzorov and a number of others.

== General information ==
In 1848, Imam Shamil demanded Khevsurians to pay tribute to him and let his army pass through mountainous aul of Shatili, to which he was denied. Arsiko on the other hand, started to have negotiations with Shatilians, requesting them to let his army pass to Pshavi. Having been also denied, he gathered army of Kistins, namely the Mitkhois (Malkhins) and Maistins to force himself into Pshavi. However, there happened a conflict between the two groups, after which the army deserted.

== Origins ==
Dadaev and the Chechen historian Khozhaev gives a theory that there's a possibility of Arsiko and naib of Dishni — Arsanuko Arsanukaev being one person. Which would make the naib Chechen.

== Bibliography ==
- Волконскій, Н. А. (1885). "Трехлѣтіе на лезгинской кордонной линіи (1847—1849)" [Three years on the Lezgin cordon line (1847-1849)]. In Чернявскій, И. С. (ed.). Кавказскій сборникъ [Caucasian collection] (in Russian). Vol. 9. Тифлисъ: Типографія Окружнаго штаба Кавказскаго военнаго округа. pp. 157–366.
- Дадаев, Ю. У. (2006). Государство Шамиля: социально-экономическое положение, политико-правовая и военно-административная система управления [State of Shamil: socio-economic situation, political-legal and military-administrative system of government] (PDF) (in Russian). Махачкала: Ихлас. pp. 1–491.
- Дадаев, Ю. У. (2009). Наибы и мудиры Шамиля [Naibs and mudirs of Shamil] (in Russian). Махачкала: ДИНЭМ. pp. 1–621. ISBN 978-5-91446-011-9.
- Хожаев, Д. А. (1998). Мазаева, Т. (ed.). Чеченцы в Русско-Кавказской войне [Chechens in the Russian-Caucasian War] (in Russian). Грозный-Санкт-Петербург: Седа. pp. 1–250. ISBN 5-85973-012-8. Archived from the original on 2014-12-22.
- Цагарейшвили, Ш. В., ed. (1953). Шамиль — ставленник Султанской Турции и английских колонизаторов: сборник документальных материалов [Shamil, a protege of Sultan's Turkey and the British colonialists: a collection of documentary materials] (in Russian). Тбилиси: Госиздат Грузинской ССР. pp. 1–557.
