= Vilayet Arshtkhoy =

Administrative unit of the Caucasian Imamate

Vilayet Arshtkhoy ولاية أرشتخوي (Arabic)
- Imamate Province (1840–1851)
- 1840–1851
- Flag

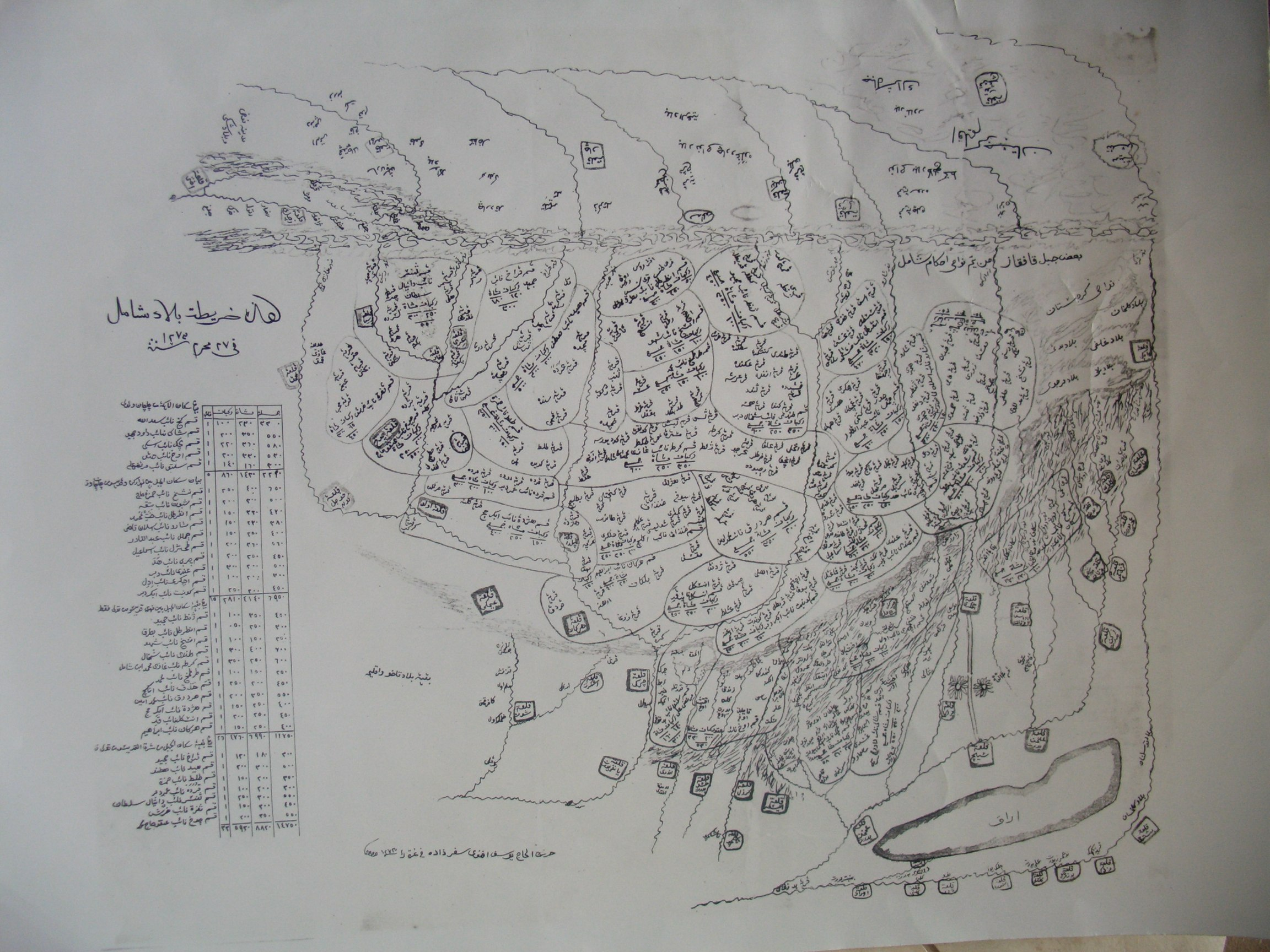
- Capital: Arshty
- Demonym: Arshtkhoy
- Government
- Naib
  - 1848-1851: Muhammad-Mirza Anzorov (last)
- Historical era: Early modern period
  - Established: 1840
  - Disestablished: 1851
Succeeded by
Russian Empire

Vilayet Arshtkhoy, Vilayet Arshty, Arshtinskiy Vilayet, was an Ingush administrative unit of the North Caucasian Imamate. It was established on the territory of Orstkhoy society with the center being the village of Arshty.

== Etymology ==
The name Vilayet Arshtkhoy derives from the Arabic Wilaya and the self-name of Orstkhoy — Arshtkhoy.

== History ==
Vilayet Arshtkhoy which was known in the Russian Empire as Arshtinskoe Naibstvo, was established in March 1840 on the territory of Orstkhoy Society with the center of it being the village of Arshty, when the Karabulak (Orstkhoy) and Galashian societies joined the uprising of Chechnya and with their deputies together with Chechens solemnly swore allegiance to Imam Shamil in the large center village of Lesser Chechnya, Urus-Martan.

In 1851 the Vilayet was disestablished when it was conquered by Russian Empire.

== Naibs ==
- Muhammad-Mirza Anzorov

== Bibliography ==
- Кодзоев, Н. Д. (2002). История ингушского народа. Глава 5. ГЛАВА 5 ИНГУШЕТИЯ В XIX В. § 1. Ингушетия в первой половине XIX в. Основание Назрани [History of the Ingush people. Chapter 5. CHAPTER 5 INGUSHETIA IN THE 19th CENTURY § 1. Ingushetia in the first half of the 19th century. Foundation of Nazran] (in Russian). Archived from the original on 2019-07-23.
- Павлова, О. С. (2012). Ингушский этнос на современном этапе: черты социально-психологического портрета [The Ingush ethnos at the present stage: features of the socio-psychological portrait] (in Russian). Москва: Форум. pp. 1–384. ISBN 9785911346652. OCLC 798995782.
- Ржевуский, А. (1888). Терцы. Сборник исторических, бытовых и географическо-статистических сведений о Терскомъ казачьем войске [Tertsy. Collection of historical, everyday, geographical and statistical information about the Terek Cossack army] (in Russian). Владикавказ: Типография Областнаго Правления Терской Области. pp. 1–292.
- Хожаев, Д. А. (1998). Мазаева, Тамара (ed.). Чеченцы в Русско-Кавказской войне [Chechens in the Russian-Caucasian War] (in Russian). Грозный-Санкт-Петербург: Седа. pp. 1–250. ISBN 5-85973-012-8. Archived from the original on 2014-12-22.
