= Siege of Nazran (1841) =

- Part of the Caucasian War
Date	6–7 April 1841
Location	Nazran fortress, Ingushetia
Result	Russian–Ingush victory

Belligerents
Russian Empire; Ingush militias	Caucasian Imamate

Commanders and leaders
Colonel Nesterov	Imam Shamil; Akhverdy-Magoma; Kahar

Strength
~1,500	~16,000–20,000

Casualties and losses
15 killed 60 wounded	~60 killed ~200 wounded

The siege of Nazran took place on April 6–7, 1841, during the Caucasian War. Forces of the Caucasian Imamate under Imam Shamil attacked the fortress of Nazran (in present-day Ingushetia), but were repelled by the Russian garrison and local Ingush militias.

== Background ==
By 1841, Imam Shamil had consolidated his power over much of the North Caucasus. Following the failed Russian expedition of 1840, Shamil used the winter to regroup his forces. The Nazran Fortress was a strategic Russian stronghold on the Sunzha River; its capture would have opened the route to Vladikavkaz and threatened Russian control over the region.

== The siege ==
In early April 1841, Shamil assembled a force of approximately 16,000 to 20,000 men and laid siege to the fortress. As early as March 1841, Shamil had been planning the campaign, sending envoys to coordinate actions with other North Caucasian groups. The Russian garrison, commanded by Colonel Nesterov, consisted of about 1,500 men (including regular infantry, Cossacks, and local Ingush volunteers). Local Ingush militias fought alongside the regular troops.

The fighting lasted for two days, from April 6 to 7. Shamil's forces bombarded the fortress from the surrounding heights but were unable to break through the defence. The garrison and its Ingush allies offered stubborn resistance and forced Shamil to retreat. On April 8, Nesterov was informed that Shamil and his entire detachment had withdrawn to the Konchinsky forest during the night.

== Aftermath ==
The Russian and Ingush forces lost 15 killed and 60 wounded; Shamil's forces suffered approximately 60 killed and 200 wounded.

Following the successful defence, Emperor Nicholas I awarded the Nazranian community the St. George Banner in recognition of their bravery and loyalty. The repulse at Nazran forced Shamil to abandon his immediate plans; he later shifted his focus to the November 1841 raid on Kizlyar, which also ultimately failed.

== Sources ==
- Khozhaev, Dalkhan Abdulazizovich (1998). Чеченцы в Русско-Кавказской войне [Chechens in the Russian-Caucasian War] (in Russian). Grozny: Seda. — includes detailed account of the siege preparations and the Ingush role.
- "Оборона Назрани". Руниверс.
- "Кампания на Северном Кавказе 1841 г." Руниверс.
- "Знамя за отражение нападения Шамиля на крепость Назрань передано Ингушетии". Interfax Russia. 2024-10-21.
- "Крепость Назрань". Командировка.ру.
- "Краткая история крепости Назрань". LifeGlobe. 2024-07-14.
