= Arshty =

Rural locality in Ingushetia

Arshty Аршты
- Selo

Other transcription(s)
  - Ingush: Аьрште (Note: Commonly mentioned as Ärshte (Ingush: Аьрште), however the village was sometimes mentioned as Arshte (Арште) or Ērshte (Эрште).)
- Interactive map of Arshty
- Location of Arshty Arshty (Republic of Ingushetia)
- Coordinates: 43°08′21″N 45°07′46″E
- Country: Russia
- Federal subject: Ingushetia
- Founded: 1705

Population (2010 Census)
  - Total: 1,347
  - Estimate (2021): 1,473 (+9.4%)

Administrative status
  - Subordinated to: Sunzhensky District
- Time zone: UTC+3 (MSK)
- Postal code: 386247
- OKTMO ID: 26610440101

Arshty (Note: Russian: Аршты; Ingush: Аьрште, romanized: Äršte, lit. 'On the plain'; Chechen: Аьршта, romanized: Äršta) is a rural locality (a selo) in Sunzhensky District of the Republic of Ingushetia, Russia, located on left bank of the river Arshtynka near the border with the Republic of Chechnya. It forms the municipality of the rural settlement of Arshty as the only settlement in its composition.

== Geography ==
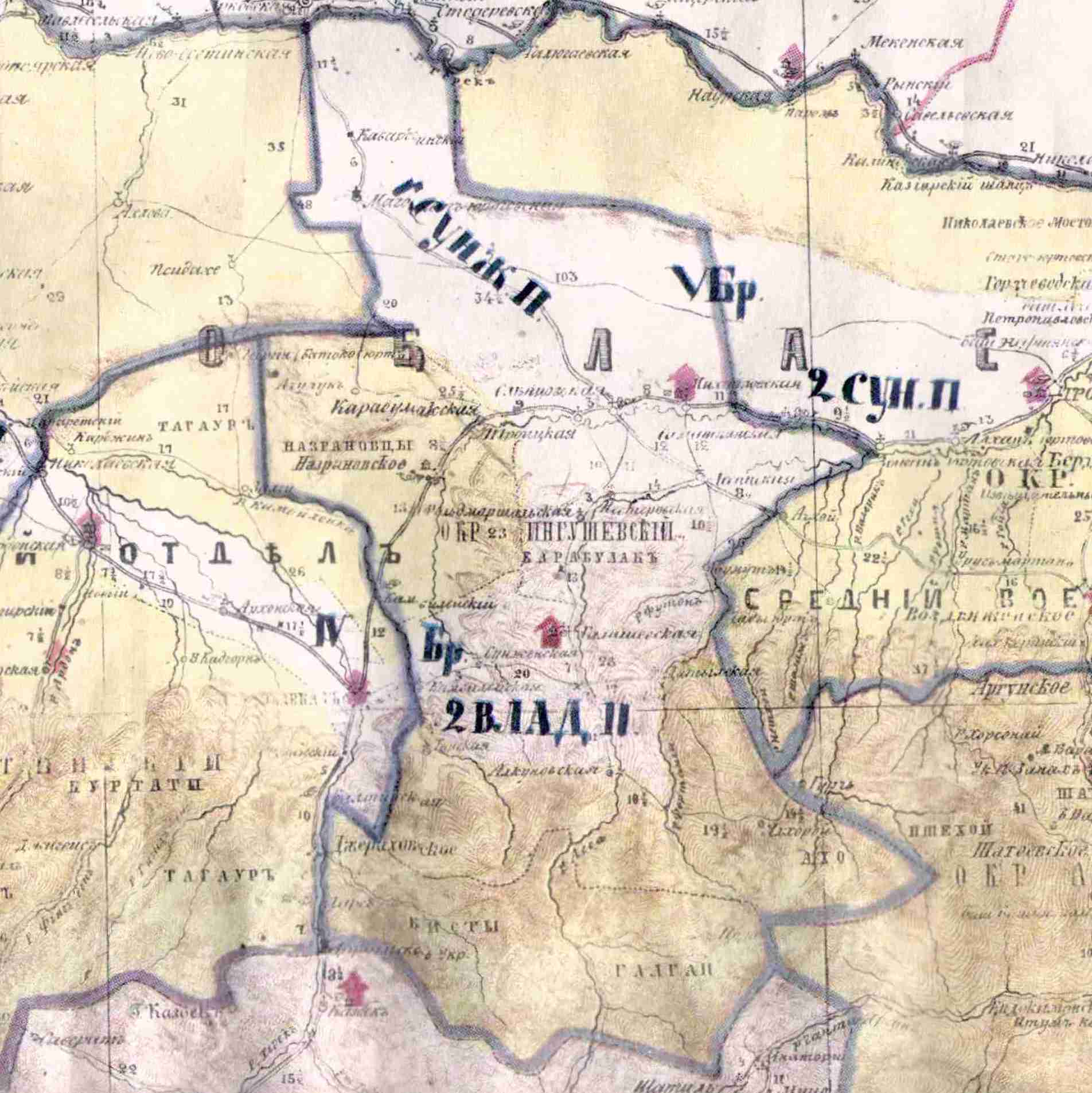
The village of Arshty on the map of the Ingush district in 1853.

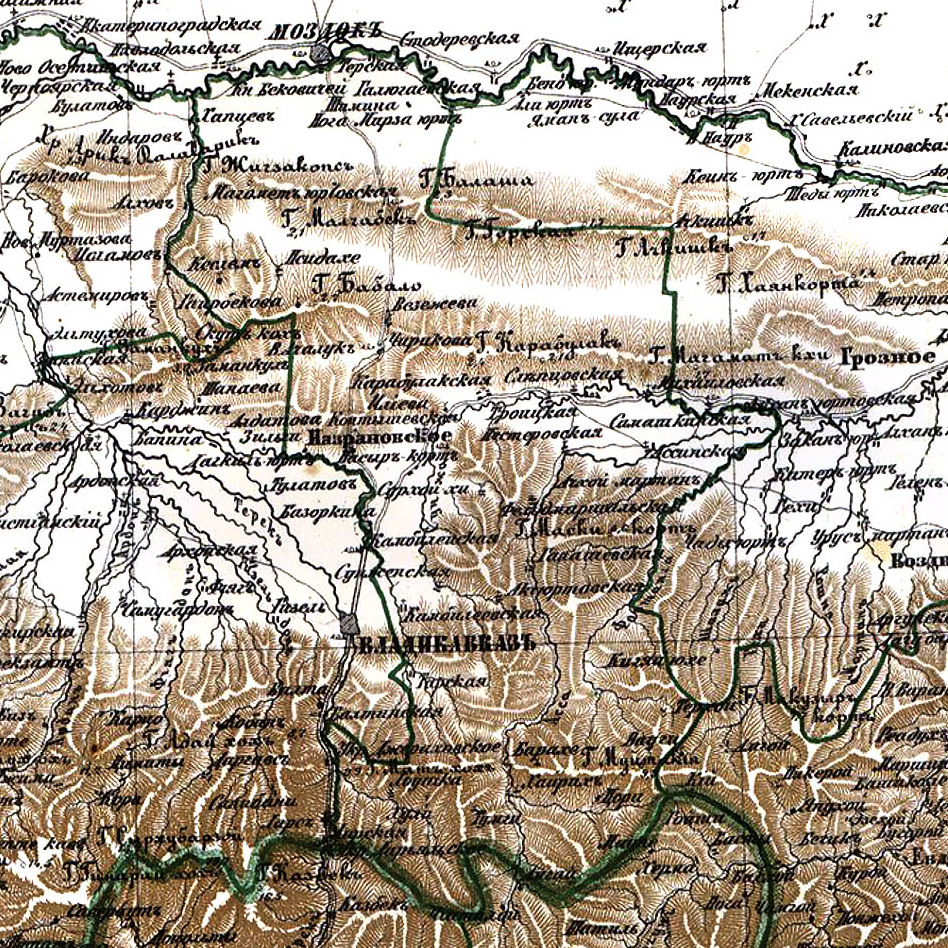
The village of Arshty on the map of the Ingush district in 1869.

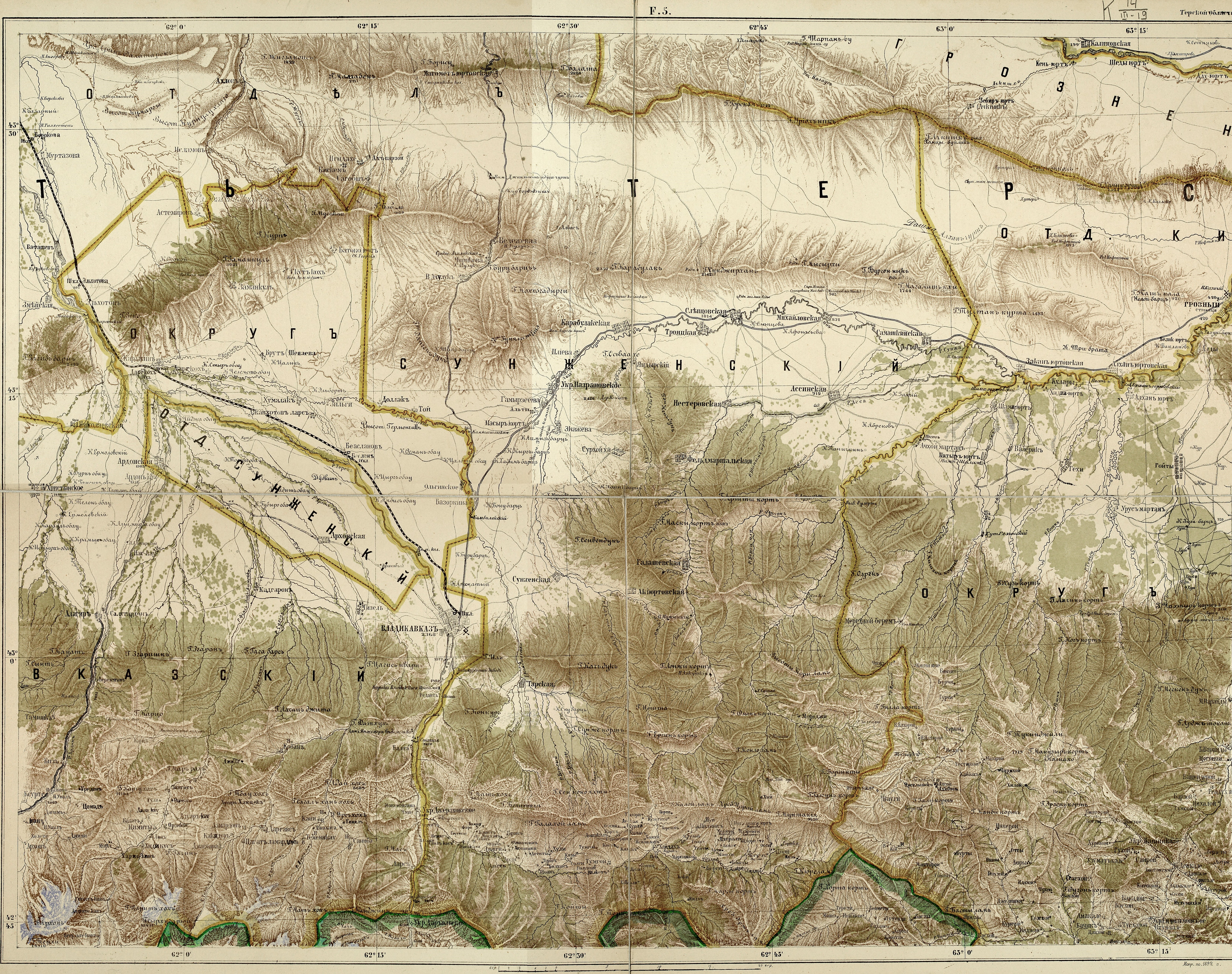
The village Arshty on the map of Sunzhensky (Ingush) otdel in 1892

The village is located on the left bank of the Arshtynka River, just above its confluence with Faetonka, 20 km south of the regional center - the city of Sunzha and 26 km east of the capital of the republic - the city of Magas.

The nearest settlements are: in the north - the village of Chemulga, in the northeast - the village of Bamut and in the southwest - Akati farm.

== History ==
In the second half of the 18th century (1770s), the German researcher J. A. Güldenstädt indicates Arshty and some other Orstkhoy villages among the total number of Ingush villages and districts proper.

In the winter of 1825, Cossack and Chechen militsiya under the leadership of General Nikolai Grekov made a punitive expedition to Arshty and devastated it. During the Caucasian War, starting from 1840, the village was the center of the Vilayet Arshtkhoy, an administrative unit of the Caucasian Imamate.

Since 1861, Arshty has been in the Ingushskiy Okrug of the Terek Oblast. In 1859, caucasologist and military-historian Adolf Berge in his principal work Chechenya and Chechens mentioned Arshty among the Galashian villages. As a result of the eviction of the Orstkhoys to Turkey in 1865, including to the village of Arshty, an intensive resettlement of the Malkhists and Maystins began. Since 1924, the village of Arshty, together with neighboring Bamut, was part of Ingush Autonomous Oblast. According to the Soviet Census in 1926, upper Arshty had population of 303, 303 people of Ingush ethnicity. Lower Arshty had population of 550, 546 people of Ingush ethnicity.

In 1944, after the Deportation of Chechens and Ingush and the abolition of the Chechen-Ingush Autonomous Soviet Socialist Republic, the village of Arshty was renamed Dubravino.

After the restoration of the Chechen-Ingush Autonomous Soviet Socialist Republic, in 1958 the settlement was returned to its former name - Arshty.

During the First Chechen war on February 22, 1996, the village was shelled by Russian troops by mistake, as the Russian soldiers had a misconception that Chechen rebels were hiding in Arshty. This incident killed ten people, mostly women.

== Bibliography ==
=== Russian sources ===
- Барахоева, Н. М.; Кодзоев, Н. Д.; Хайров, Б. А. (2016). Ингушско-русский словарь терминов [Ingush-Russian dictionary of terms] (in Ingush and Russian) (2 ed.). Нальчик: ООО «Тетраграф». pp. 1–288.
- Берже, А. П. (1859). Чечня и чеченцы [Chechnya and Chechens] (in Russian). Тифлис: Типография Главного Управления Наместника Кавказского. pp. 1–141.
- Волкова, Н. Г. (1974). Гарданов, В. К. (ed.). Этнический состав населения Северного Кавказа в XVIII — начале XX века [Ethnic composition of the population of the North Caucasus in the 18th - early 20th centuries] (in Russian). Москва: Наука. pp. 1–276.
- Гюльденштедт, Иоганн Антон (2002). "VI. Провинция Кистия, или Кистетия" [VI. Province of Kistia, or Kistetia]. In Карпов, Ю. Ю. (ed.). Путешествие по Кавказу в 1770-1773 гг. [Journey through the Caucasus in 1770-1773.] (in Russian). Translated by Шафроновской, Т. К. Санкт-Петербург: Петербургское Востоковедение. pp. 238–243. ISBN 5-85803-213-3.
- Хожаев, Д. А. (1998). Мазаева, Тамара (ed.). Чеченцы в Русско-Кавказской войне [Chechens in the Russian-Caucasian War] (in Russian). Грозный-Санкт-Петербург: Седа. pp. 1–250. ISBN 5-85973-012-8. Archived from the original on 2014-12-22.
- Kamyshev, D. (1996-02-27). "Ингушетия: Генералы нашли общий язык" [Ingushetia: The generals found a common language]. Kommersant (in Russian). No. 31. Москва: Kommersant. p. 3. eISSN 1563-6380. ISSN 1561-347X. OCLC 244126120.
- Кодзоев, Н. Д. (2021). Хайрова, Р. Р. (ed.). Русско-ингушский словарь [Russian-Ingush dictionary] (in Ingush and Russian). Ростов-на-Дону: Типография «Лаки Пак». pp. 1–656. ISBN 978-5-906785-55-8.
- Мальсагов, З. К. (1963). Оздоева, Ф. (ed.). Грамматика ингушского языка [Grammar of the Ingush language] (in Ingush and Russian). Vol. 5 (2nd ed.). Грозный: Чечено-Ингушское Книжное Издательство. pp. 1–164.
- Общенациональная Комиссия по рассмотрению вопросов, связанных с определением территории и границ Ингушетии (2021). Всемирный конгресс ингушского народа (ed.). Доклад о границах и территории Ингушетии (общие положения) [Report on the borders and territory of Ingushetia (general provisions)] (archival documents, maps, illustrations) (in Russian). Назрань. pp. 1–175.
- Оздоев, И. А. (1980). Оздоева, Ф. Г.; Куркиев, А. С. (eds.). Русско-ингушский словарь: 40 000 слов [Russian-Ingush dictionary: 40,000 words] (in Ingush and Russian). Москва: Русский язык. pp. 1–832.
