= Galashki ambush =

2000 incident in Russia

- Part of Second Chechen War
Date	May 11, 2000
Location	Near Galashki, Ingushetia
Result	Chechen victory

Belligerents
Russia	Chechen Republic of Ichkeria

Commanders and leaders
(Russia) Cpt. Sergei Maziyev	(Chechen Republic of Ichkeria) Ruslan Khuchbarov

Strength
22	15–35

Casualties and losses
Official figure: 19 killed 2 wounded	No casualties

Galashki ambush took place of May 11, 2000, when the separatist militants from the group of Shamil Basayev, led by a Galashki native Ruslan Khuchbarov, attacked and destroyed a convoy of the Russian Interior Ministry paramilitary forces in the Republic of Ingushetia. The incident was the first major act of violence linked to the Second Chechen War in Ingushetia and the first major rebel raid outside the neighbouring Chechnya since war began in 1999.

== Battle ==
According to the Russian sources, in the convoy there were 22 Internal Troops servicemen from Altai Krai, returning aboard two military trucks to Vladikavkaz, capital city of the Republic of North Ossetia–Alania, having completed a tour of duty in Ingushetia. At about 12 am, at a highway near the village of Galashki, a group of rebels located in the woods overlooking the road suddenly opened fire on them with grenade launchers and machine guns (some sources also mention mortar and sniper fire), disabling the first truck and then quickly obliterating the whole convoy. Following their attack, the rebels managed to escape the pursuit and vanished into the forest near the village of Bamut in Chechnya.

== Aftermath ==
According to the Chechen separatist website Kavkaz Center, three heavy trucks and two BTR armored vehicles were destroyed, while "not less than 40" Russian soldiers were killed by an unspecified unit of fighters from the Southwestern Front of the Armed Forces of the Chechen Republic of Ichkeria.
