= Shirvani Kostoev =

Shirvani Ustarkhanovich Kostoev
- Ширвани Устарханович Костоев
- Kostoev, c. 1945
- Born: 1923; Galashki, Chechen-Ingush ASSR, RSFSR, USSR
- Died: 6 August 1949 (aged 25–26); Jelgava, Latvian SSR, USSR
- Military career
- Allegiance: Soviet Union
- Branch: Soviet Air Force
- Service years: 1941–1949
- Rank: Senior Lieutenant
- Unit: 64th Attack Aviation Regiment
- Conflicts: World War II
- Awards: Hero of the Russian Federation

Shirvani Ustarkhanovich Kostoev (Russian: Ширвани Устарханович Костоев; 1923 – 6 August 1949) was an Ingush Ilyushin Il-2 pilot and flight commander in the 64th Attack Aviation Regiment during the Second World War. He was posthumously declared a Hero of the Russian Federation in 1995.

== Early life ==
Kostoev was born in 1923 in the village of Galashki to an Ingush family. He completed secondary school in his hometown and trained at an aeroclub before entering the army in 1941.

== Military career ==
After being drafted into the Red Army in 1941 Kostoev was sent to the Krasnodar School of Pilots. The German invasion of the Soviet Union began while he was a cadet at the school, but instead of being sent to the front immediately he was sent to Saratov and the Trans-baikal territory, where he mastered piloting the Ilyushin Il-2. He was deployed to the warfront in autumn 1944 as part of the 64th Attack Aviation Regiment, which had suffered losses but received new aircraft. Having made his first sortie in October, he completed 92 sorties by the end of the war. In his short amount of time on the warfront, he rose from the rank of starshina to junior lieutenant and was made a flight commander. On the day before Nazi Germany surrendered he managed to destroy a tank and a mortar battery. His Ingush nationality may have been a factor in him not being awarded the title Hero of the Soviet Union; in 1945 he visited his exiled family in Kazakhstan, who were deported along with the rest of the Chechen and Ingush civilians during 1944. After the war he was sent to the Baltic military district, where he was killed in a plane crash while conducting a test flight in 1949.

== Awards ==
- Hero of the Russian Federation (6 July 1995)
- Order of the Red Banner (18 May 1945)
- Order of the Patriotic War 1st and 2nd class (16 June 1945 and 11 April 1945)
- Order of the Red Star (4 February 1945)

== See also ==
- Murad Ozdoev
- Ahmed Malsagov
