= Ruslan Khuchbarov =

Ingush militant

- Хучбаранаькъан Тагира Руслан
- Born: November 12, 1972; Pervomayskoe, Chechen-Ingush ASSR, RSFSR, USSR
- Died: 3 September 2004 (aged 31); Beslan, North Ossetia, Russia
- Military career
- Allegiance: Chechen Republic of Ichkeria
- Nickname: "Polkovnik"
- Conflicts: Second Chechen War: Galashki ambush; Beslan school hostage crisis

Ruslan Tagirovich Khuchbarov (Note: Russian: Русла́н Таги́рович Хучба́ров; Ingush: Хучбаранаькъан Тагира Руслан, romanized: Khuchbaranäqhan Tagira Ruslan) (12 November 1972 – 3 September 2004), was an Ingush militant nicknamed "Polkovnik" (the Russian for Colonel) notorious for his leading role in the 2004 Beslan school hostage crisis.

== Biography ==
Khuchbarov was an ethnic Ingush from the village of Galashki in Ingushetia. His body was reportedly identified after he was killed during the storming of the school.

According to FSB information obtained by the Russian newspaper Vremya Novostey, Khuchbarov was living with his Russian girlfriend and their son in Oryol Oblast, until he was accused of murder and attempted murder of two members of the Armenian diaspora and declared wanted in 1998. Khuchbarov then went into hiding and moved to Chechnya, where he underwent extensive combat training in a camp of the field commander Ibragimov and took the nickname Colonel, collaborating with Arbi Barayev. Eventually he joined the brigade of Shamil Basayev and became one of his closest associates in Ingushetia. Khuchbarov and one other rebel, Amriev, were responsible for the Galashki ambush in Ingushetia on 11 May 2000, killing 18 soldiers and officers and wounding three. The bombing of the Ingushetian Department of the FSB on 15 September 2003, when three people died and 32 were seriously injured, has also been ascribed to Khuchbarov. He was involved in the training of suicide attackers.

Russian sources initially reported "Polkovnik" to be Ali Taziyev, a former Ingush policeman-turned-rebel who was declared legally dead in 2000. However, this was later refuted by the Russian prosecutors. Investigators then alleged this was the same person as Akhmed Yevloyev, an Ingush terrorist leader also said to be Ali Taziyev, but those reports were declared incorrect later: although he had similar features as Yevloyev, his facial profile was a lot different. In addition, Yevloyev turned out to be still alive.
