= Galashians =

Ingush society

Галашкархой
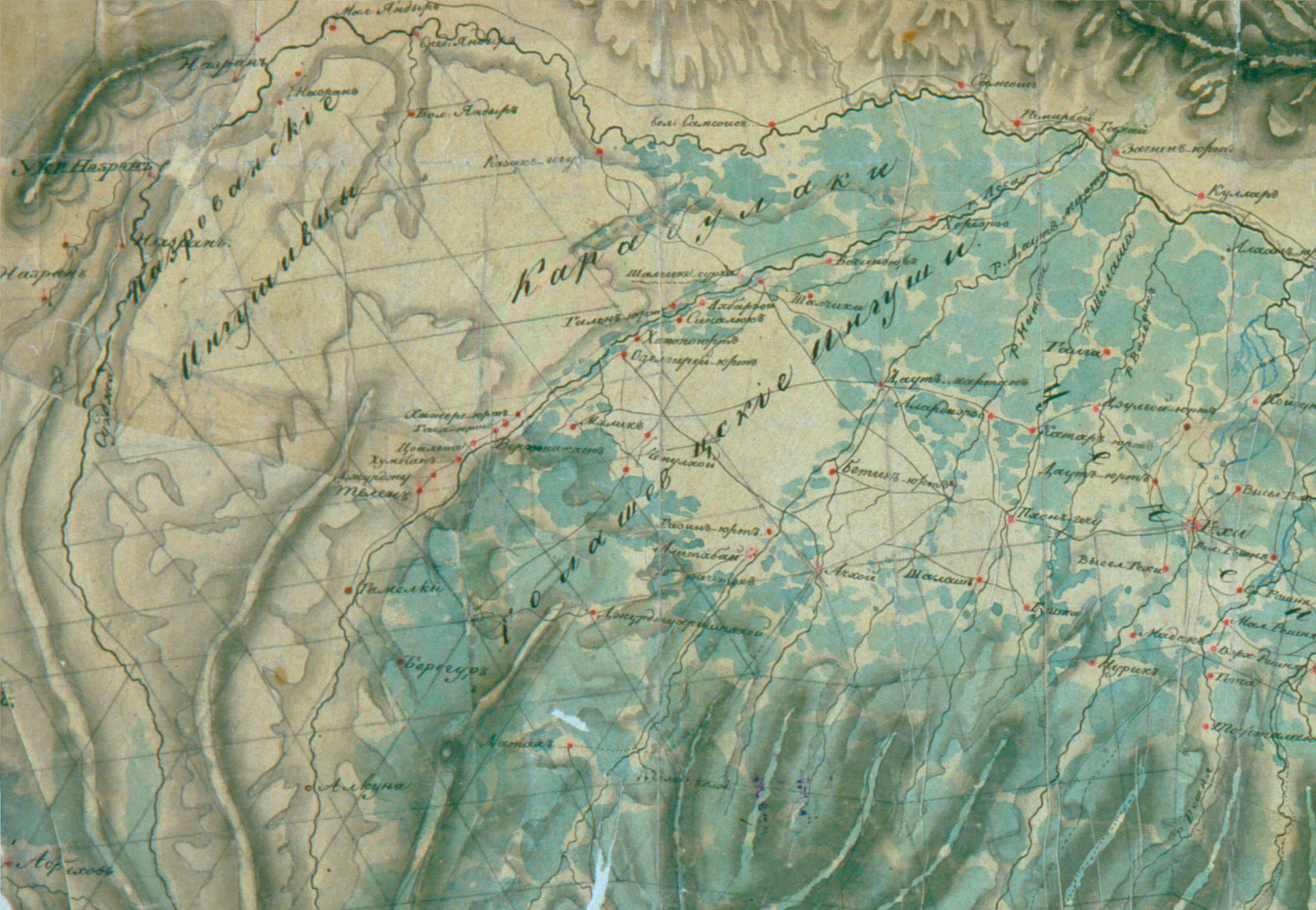
- Galashian Ingush (Галашевцскiе Ингуши) on Captain Blum's map in 1830

Total population
- 2131 (1851)

Regions with significant populations
- Ingushetia

Languages
- Ingush

Religion
- Sunni Islam

Galashians (Note: Also known as Galash (Галашъ), Galashi (Галаши), and Shadgoyians.) (Ingush: Галашкахой, romanized: Galaşkaxoy, IPA: [ˈɡɑɫəʃkəxʷɔɪ]) were a historical Ingush ethnoterritorial society, (Note: Galashians, including under the names such as Galashi, Galash, Shadgoyians, were mentioned as an Ingush society by Blaramberg, "Overview of the political state of the Caucasus in 1840", Karl Koch, "Military Statistical Review of the Russian Empire, 1851", I. Ivanov, Volkonsky, Rzhevusky, Vertepov, Pantyukhov, Kovalevsky, Dmitry Milyutin, Martirosian, Soviet Ethnography, Krupnov, Volkova, Dagestani branch of the Academy of Sciences of the Soviet Union, G. Anchabadze, Berzhnoy, Dobaev, Kraynyuchenko and V. A. Kuznetsov.) which formed in the middle of the 18th century. The name derives from the village of Galashki, which is geographically located in the center of the society. The Galashians inhabited the middle and lower reaches of the Assa river and the Fortanga river basin.

== History ==
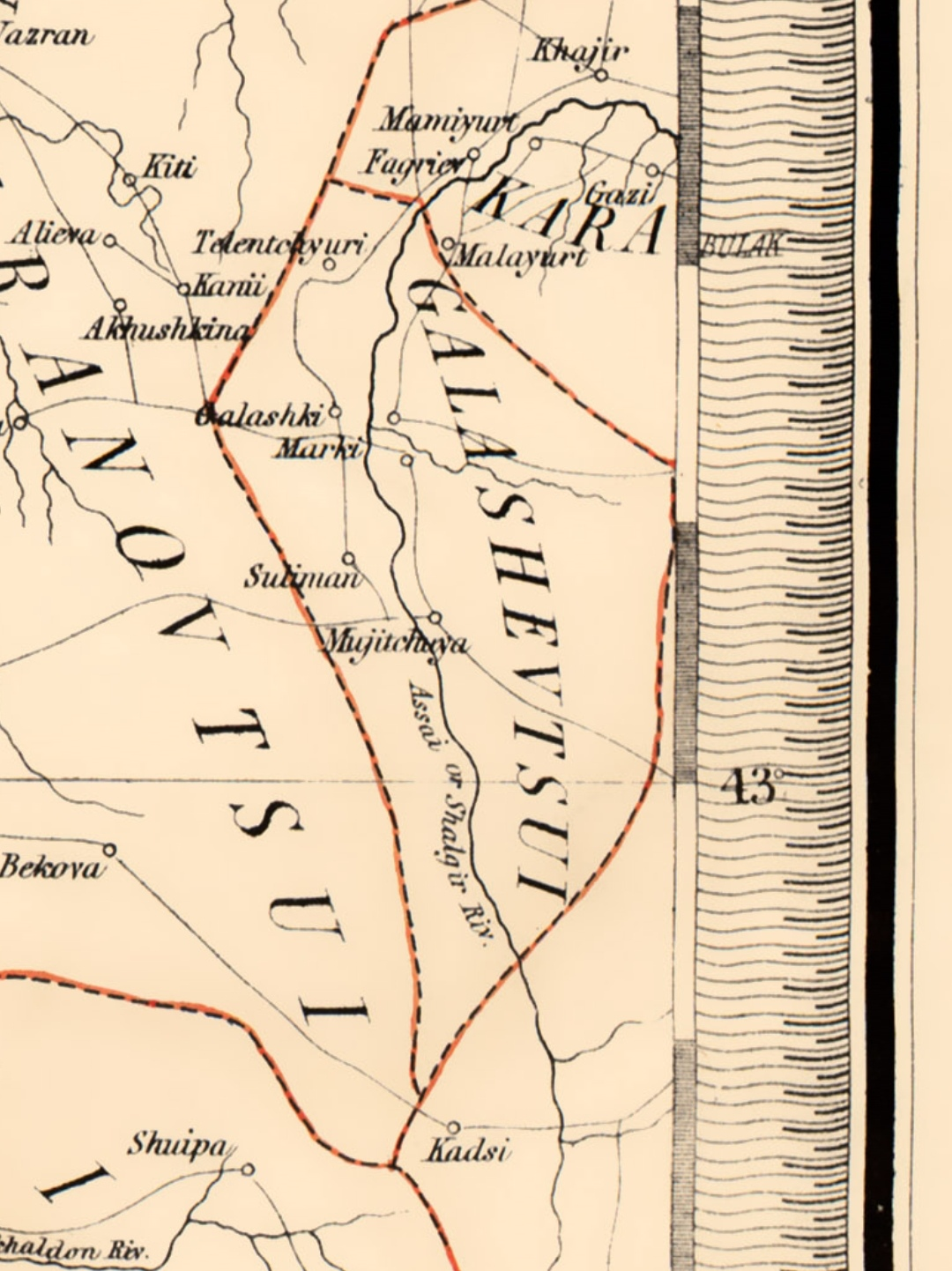
Galashevtsui on a map in 1855.

=== Formation of the Society ===
The Galashian society was formed in the second half of the 18th century by mountain Ingush that settled in lowlands between Assa and Fortanga rivers. The Orstkhoy and Ghalghai (Tsorin and Khamkhin) societies played the greatest role in the formation of the Galashian society. (Note: According to other sources, Galashians are simply a branch of the Karabulaks (Orstkhoy).) The settlements of the Galashians are first recorded on the map of 1768, where they are marked as Galachi at the confluence of the Assa river into the Sunzha river.

=== Caucasian War ===
During the Caucasian War, the Galashians strongly resisted the Russian expansion in the region and were commonly referred as "un-ruly" or "half-conquered" by the Russian Empire, as they never fully submitted to Russian rule and continued carrying out raids against Russian military fortifications and settlements.

The Galashians actively participated on the side of Imamate. In March 1840, the Galashian and Karabulak (Orstkhoy) societies participated in the uprising of Chechnya and with their deputies together with Chechens solemnly swore allegiance to Imam Shamil in the large center village of Lesser Chechnya, Urus-Martan, thus becoming part of the Imamate.

As the letter of Muhammad Amin Asiyalav dating back to October 1848 states, the Naib of the Vilayet of Kalay (Galashkinskoe Naibstvo) was Muhammad-Mirza Anzorov, a Kabardian naib who at that time also governed Minor Chechnya as a district of the Imamate:

From the knowledgeable mudir, adherent of Islam Muhammadamin to his generous brothers and glorious friends, the valiant, zealous, brave inhabitants of Kalai and Arashdi – salam is constant.

And then – obedience to the imam is the duty of every person, and helping Islam is the duty of men.

You should obey the one who is placed over you, and he is our faithful brother Muhammadmirza.

The Galashians were conquered in the end of Caucasian War after numerous punitive expeditions.

Chronology of major events:

- 1830 — Punitive expedition of Abkhazov to mountainous Ingushetia, during which the Galashian society was also affected.
- 1832 — Due to the collaboration of Ingush with Ghazi Muhammad and the murder of a bailiff, Rozen led a punitive expedition on Ingush and went through Dzheyrakh and Metskhal around Khamkhi and Tsori, during which the Galashian society was also affected.
- 1840 — the Karabulak (Orstkhoy) and Galashian societies joined the uprising of Chechnya and with their deputies together with Chechens solemnly swore allegiance to Imam Shamil in the large center village of Lesser Chechnya, Urus-Martan. Thus Galashkinskoe Naibstvo was established.
- January 1847 — Russian troops under the command of General Nesterov made a punitive expedition to Galashian Gorge.
- 1858 — The Galashians together with the Nazranians took part in one of the episodes of the Great Caucasian War — the Nazran uprising, which ended unsuccessfully and the leaders of the uprising were either executed or exiled.
- After the end of the war — Galashians, alongside Akkins, Tsorins and Ghalghaï were forcibly evicted/resettled to lowlands and their lands were given to Cossacks.

=== Modern History ===
After the Russian Revolution of 1917, when the Cossack territories that divided the Ingush societies were largely abolished, the official significance of territorial societies declined. Following the formation of the Ingush Autonomous Oblast, this system completely disappeared. Nevertheless, for some time, the Ingush who inhabited the foothill lands and especially the Galashkinsky District, continued to be referred to as Galashians.

== Demographics ==
| Year | Population | Source |
| 1833 | 2000 | Document |
| 1858 | 4 000 | "Voennyi entsiklopedicheskiy leksion" |

== See also ==
- Galashkinskoe Naibstvo
- Ingush societies
- Nazranians
- Khamkhins
- Fyappiy

== Bibliography ==
=== English sources ===
- Anchabadze, George (2001). Vainakhs (The Chechen and Ingush). Tbilisi: Caucasian House. pp. 1–76.

=== Russian sources ===
- Берже, А. П. (1859). Чечня и чеченцы [Chechnya and Chechens] (in Russian). Тифлис: Типография Главного Управления Наместника Кавказского. pp. 1–141.
- Бларамберг, И. Ф. (2010). Историческое, топографическое, статистическое, этнографическое и военное описание Кавказа [Historical, topographical, statistical, ethnographic and military description of the Caucasus] (field research) (in Russian). Translated by Назарова, И. М. Moscow: Издательство Надыршин. pp. 1–402. ISBN 978-5-902744-10-8.
- Де-Саже (1902). "Покорение Галашек" [Conquest of Galashki]. Военный Сборник (in Russian) (2). СПб.: Тип. Главнаго Управ. Удѣлов – via Wikisource.
- Казбекъ, Г. Н. (1888). Военно-статистическое описаніе Терской области: Ч. 1—2 [Military-statistical description of the Terek region: Part 1–2] (in Russian). Тифлисъ: Тип. А. А. Михельсона. pp. 1–432.
- Modest, I. B.; Obshchestvo voennykh i literatorov (1858). Военный энциклопедический лексикон, издаваемый Обществом военных и литераторов [Voennyĭ ėn︠t︡siklopedicheskīĭ leksikon, izdavaemyĭ Obshchestvom voennykh i literatorov] (in Russian). Vol. 14. SPb.: V tip. Shtaba voenno-uchebnykh zavedeniĭ. pp. 1–718.
- Бѣлевичъ, К. (1872). "Воспоминанія о Слѣпцовѣ и Пассекѣ" [Memories of Sleptsov and Passek]. Нива (in Russian) (32). СПб.: Тип. и Литографія А. Траншеля – via Wikisource.
- "Обзор политического состояния Кавказа 1840 года" [Overview of the political state of the Caucasus in 1840]. www.vostlit.info (in Russian). 1840.
- Koch, Karl (1843). Reise durch Russland nach dem kankasischen Isthmus in den Jahern 1836, 1837 und 1838 [Journey through Russia to the Caucasian Isthmus in the years 1836, 1837 and 1838] (in German). Vol. 2. Stuttgart und Tübingen: Druck und Verlag der J. G. Cotta'sche Buchhandlung. pp. 1–559.
- "Кавказскій край" [Caucasian territory]. Военно-статистическое обозрѣніе Россійской имперіи: издаваемое по высочайшему повеленію при 1-м отделеніи Департамента Генеральнаго штаба [Military Statistical Review of the Russian Empire: published by the highest command at the 1st branch of the Department of the General Staff] (in Russian). Vol. 16: Part 1. St Petersburg: Типографія Департамента Генеральнаго штаба. 1851. pp. 1–274.
- Иванов, И. (2 September 1851). "Чечня" [Chechnya]. Москвитянин (in Russian). No. 19–20. Ставрополь: Михаил Погодин.
- Волконскій, Н. А. (1886). "Война на Восточномъ Кавказѣ съ 1824 по 1834 годы въ связи съ мюридизмомъ" [War in the Eastern Caucasus from 1824 to 1834 in connection with Muridism]. In Чернявскій, И. С. (ed.). Кавказскій сборникъ [Caucasian collection] (in Russian). Vol. 10. Тифлис: Типографія Окружнаго штаба Кавказскаго военнаго округа. pp. 1–224.
- Ржевускій, А. (1888). Терцы. Сборникъ исторических, бытовыхъ и географическо-статистическихъ свѣдѣній о Терскомъ казачьем войскѣ [Tertsy. Collection of historical, everyday, geographical-statistical information about the Terek Cossacks army] (in Russian). Владикавказъ: Типографія Областнаго Правленiя Терской Области. pp. 1–292.
- Вертепов, Г. А. (1892). "Ингуши. Историко-статистическій очеркъ". In Максимов, Е.; Вертепов, Г. А. (eds.). Туземцы Сѣвернаго Кавказа. Историко-статистическіе очерки. Выпускъ первый. Осетины, ингуши, кабардинцы [Natives of the North Caucasus. Historical and statistical essays. First issue. Ossetians, Ingush, Kabardians] (in Russian). Владикавказъ: Типографія Областнаго правленія Терской Области. pp. 71–138.
- Пантюхов, И. И. (1901). Ингуши: антропологическій очеркъ [Ingush: an anthropological essay] (in Russian). Тифлисъ: Типографія К. П. Козловскаго. pp. 1–35.
- Потто, В. А., ed. (1904). Утвержденіе русскаго владычества на Кавказѣ [The assertion of Russian rule in the Caucasus]. Vol. 3: Part 1. Тифлисъ: Типографія штаба Кавказскаго военного округа. pp. 1–527.
- Ковалевскій, П. И. (1914). Народы Кавказа [Peoples of the Caucasus]. Кавказъ (in Russian). Vol. 1. St Petersburg: Типографія М. И. Акинфіева. pp. 1–346.
- Милютин, Д. А. (1919). Христіани, Г. Г. (ed.). Воспоминанія. Книга 1, 2, 3 [Memorials. Book 1, 2, 3] (in Russian). Vol. 1. Томскъ: Изданіе военной Академіи. pp. 1–458. ISBN 5998998936.
- Мартиросиан, Г. К. (1928). Нагорная Ингушия [Upland Ingushiya] (in Russian). Владикавказ: Государственная типография Автономной Области Ингушии. pp. 1–153.
- Академия Наук СССР (1936). Советская Этнография [Soviet Ethnography] (in Russian). Ленинград: Издательство Академии Наук СССР.
- Крупнов, Е. И. (1971). Средневековая Ингушетия [Medieval Ingushetia] (in Russian). Москва: Наука. pp. 1–211.
- Волкова, Н. Г. (1973). Лавров, Л. И. (ed.). Этнонимы и племенные названия Северного Кавказа [Ethnonyms and tribal names of the North Caucasus] (in Russian). Москва: Наука. pp. 1–210.
- Бережной, Сергей Евгеньевич; Добаев, И. П; Крайнюченко, Павел Владимирович (2003). Волкова, Н. Г. (ed.). "Ислам и исламизм на юге России" [Islam and Islamism in the South of Russia] (PDF). Южно-Российское обозрение (in Russian) (17). Ростов-на-Дону: СКНЦ ВШ: 1–243 (as PDF). ISBN 9785878721448.
- Кузнецов, В. А. (2004). Введение в кавказоведение (историко-этнологические очерки народов Северного Кавказа) [Introduction to Caucasian Studies (Historical and Ethnological Essays on the Peoples of the North Caucasus)] (in Russian). Владикавказ: ИПП им. В. А. Гассиева. pp. 1–184.
- Ахмадов, Я. З. (2009). Очерк исторической географии и этнополитического развития Чечни в XVI-XVIII веках [Essay on the historical geography and ethnopolitical development of Chechnya in the 16th-18th centuries] (in Russian). Грозный: Благотворительный фонд поддержки чеченской литературы. pp. 1–422. ISBN 978-5-91821-013-0.
- Долгиева, М. Б.; Картоев, М. М.; Кодзоев, Н. Д.; Матиев, Т. Х. (2013). Кодзоев, Н. Д. (ed.). История Ингушетии [History of Ingushetia] (4nd ed.). Ростов-на-Дону: Южный издательский дом. pp. 1–600. ISBN 978-5-98864-056-1.
- Волкова, Н. Г. (1974). Гарданов, В. К. (ed.). Этнический состав населения Северного Кавказа в XVIII — начале XX века [Ethnic composition of the population of the North Caucasus in the 18th - early 20th centuries] (in Russian). Москва: Наука. pp. 1–276.
- Дагестанский филиал АН СССР (1989). Народно-освободительное движение горцев Дагестана и Чечни в 20-50-х годах XIX в: Всесоюзная научная конференция, 20-22 июня 1989 г.: тезисы докладов и сообщений [The people's liberation movement of the highlanders of Dagestan and Chechnya in the 20-50s of the XIX century: All-Union Scientific Conference, June 20–22, 1989: abstracts of reports and messages]. Makhachkala: Дагестанский филиал АН СССР. pp. 1–190.
- Гаджиев, В. Г.; Рамазанов, Х. Х. (1959). Даниялов, Г.-А. Д. (ed.). Движение горцев Северо-Восточного Кавказа в 20—50 гг. XIX века: сборник документов [The movement of the highlanders of the North-Eastern Caucasus in the 20–50s of 19th century: collection of documents] (PDF) (in Russian). Махачкала: Дагестанское книжное изд-во. pp. 1–787.
- Бартенев, П. И., ed. (1889). "Русскій архивъ" [Russian Archive] (PDF). Русскій архивъ (in Russian). No. 1–4. Moscow: Университетская типографія. pp. 1–798 (PDF).
  - Зиссерман, А. Л. (November 1889a). Бартенев, П. И. (ed.). "По поводу рассказа Н. Д. Ахшарумова: "Смерть Слѣпцова" | Русскій архивъ" [Regarding the story of N. D. Akhsharumov: "The Death of Sleptsov" | Russian Archive] (PDF). Русскій архивъ (in Russian). No. 1. Moscow: Университетская типографія. pp. 153–160 (157–164 as PDF).
  - Зиссерман, А. Л. (1889b). Бартенев, П. И. (ed.). "Фельдмаршалъ князь А. И. Барятинскій: Глава IV | Русскій архивъ" [Field Marshal knyaz A. I. Baryarsinsky | Russian Archive] (PDF). Русскій архивъ (in Russian). No. 2. Moscow: Университетская типографія. pp. 274–358 (292–376 (PDF).
- Мухаммад-Амин (c. 1848). "Письмо Мухаммадамина к жителям Калая и Арашди" [Muhammadamin's letter to the inhabitants of Kalay and Arashdy]. www.vostlit.info (in Russian).
- Жданов, Ю. А., ed. (2005). Энциклопедия культур народов Юга России. Народы Юга России [Encyclopedia of cultures of the peoples of the South of Russia. Peoples of the South of Russia] (in Russian). Vol. 1. Ростов-на-Дону: СКНЦ ВШ. pp. 1–244. ISBN 5-87872-089-2.
- Генко, А. Н. (1930). "Из культурного прошлого ингушей" [From the cultural past of the Ingush]. Записки коллегии востоковедов при Азиатском музее [Notes of the College of Orientalists at the Asian Museum] (in Russian). Vol. 5. Ленинград: Издательство Академии наук СССР. pp. 681–761.
- Кодзоев, Н. Д. (2002). История ингушского народа. Глава 5. ГЛАВА 5 ИНГУШЕТИЯ В XIX В. § 1. Ингушетия в первой половине XIX в. Основание Назрани [History of the Ingush people. Chapter 5. CHAPTER 5 INGUSHETIA IN THE XIX CENTURY § 1. Ingushetia in the first half of the XIX century. Foundation of Nazran] (in Russian). Archived from the original on 2019-07-23.
- Чудиновъ, В. (1889). "Окончательное покореніе осетинъ" [The final conquest of the Ossetians]. In Чернявскій, И. С. (ed.). Кавказскій сборникъ [Caucasian Collection] (in Russian). Vol. 13. Тифлисъ: Типографія Окружнаго штаба Кавказскаго военнаго округа. pp. 1–122.
