= Nazranians =

Ingush society

Наьсархой
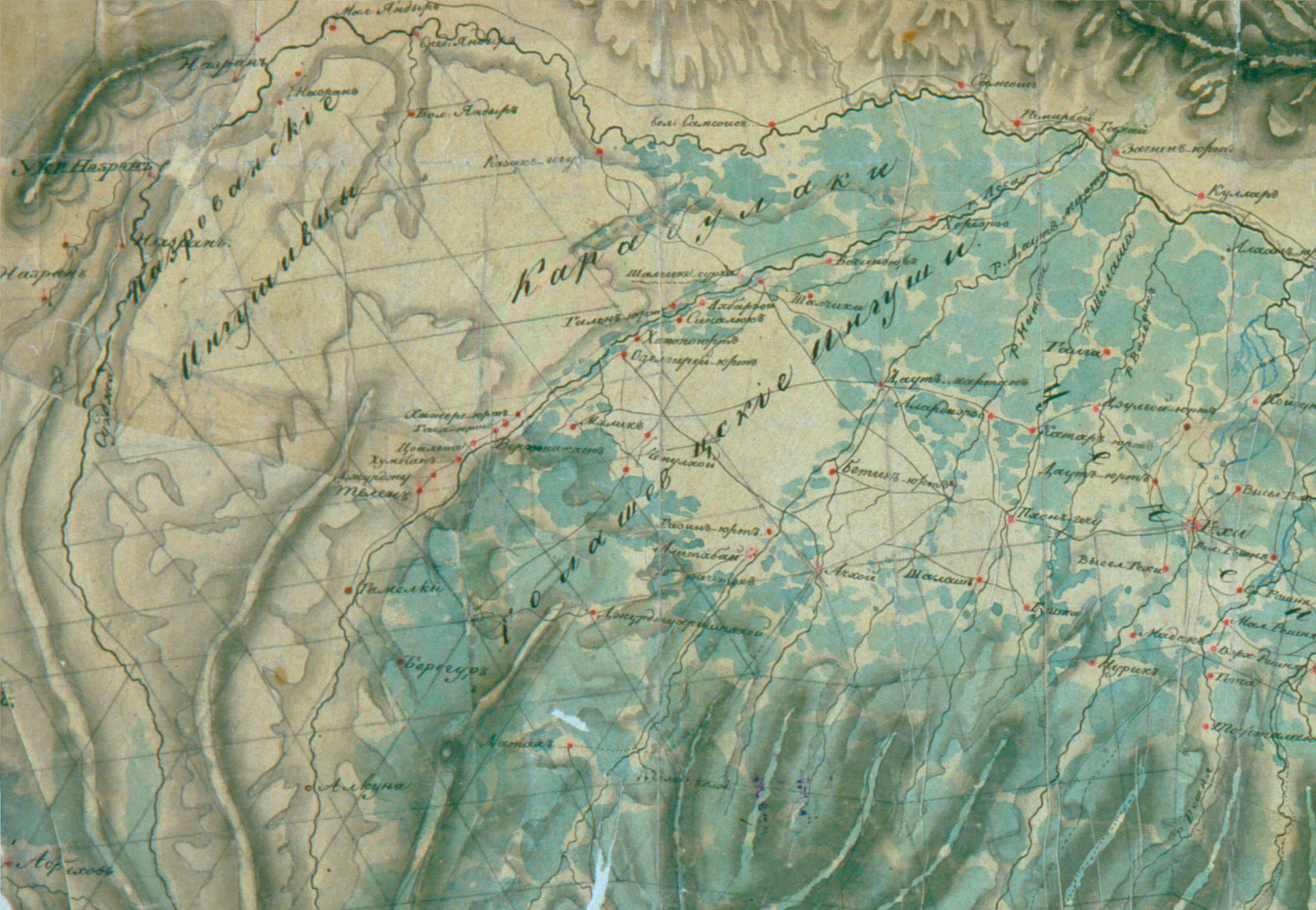
- Nazranian Ingush (Назрованскіе Ингушивцы) on Captain Blum's map in 1830

Total population
- 9,489 (1858)

Regions with significant populations
- Ingushetia

Languages
- Ingush

Religion
- Sunni Islam

The Nazranians (Ingush: Наьсархой, romanized: Näsarkhoy) were a historical Ingush ethnoterritorial subethnic group (society) that inhabited modern-day Nazranovsky District and Prigorodny District. (Note: Nazranians were mentioned as an Ingush society by vast majority of Russian Imperial, Soviet, and modern sources.)

== History ==
=== Early history ===
The Nazranian society emerged in the second half of the 18th century from mountain Ingush that settled in the lowlands between the Assa and Fortanga rivers.

=== Caucasian War ===
After the signing of the Act of Oath of six Ingush clans to Russia by some of the most powerful clans in 1810, the Nazranians were considered by the Russian administration to have been conquered and to be under its rule. However, this did not stop the Nazranians from sometimes participating on the side of the Caucasian Imamate and rebelling. There are various reports of the Nazranians being on the side of the Imamate. (Note: In 1840, the bailiff of the Ingush and Karabulak peoples, Yesaul Gaytov, reported to the command that "the Nazranians have the intention, upon the opening of spring, to surrender to the side of the rebel Shamil." In March of 1841, the representatives of the Nazranians constantly met up with Shamil, calling on the imam with an army for liberation of Ingush Muslims from the domination of giaurs. The desire of the Nazranians to go over to the side of Imamate was also confirmed by Karabulak and Galashian murids.) For example, the Nazranians participated in the general uprising in Chechnya in March 1840 and in the uprising of the Sunzha and Nadterechny Chechens, Galgaï and Karabulaks in July 1840. (Note: Донесение графу А. И. Чернышёву от 3 октября 1840 года (РГВИА. Ф. 846, Оп. 16, д. 6672 л. 24-26.): "В настоящем положении дел на левом фланге Линии Малая Чечня в особенности обращает на себя внимание, ибо там, кроме коренных ее жителей, гнездятся теперь все беглые карабулаки, назрановцы, галгаевцы, сунженские и надтеречные чеченцы и по призыву предводителя их Ахверды-Магома, сподвижника Шамиля, собрать могут значительные силы, хорошо вооружённые, вблизи Военно-Грузинской дороги." — генерал Е. А. Головин) In 1858, the Nazranians staged a major rebellion, known as the Nazran uprising. During the rebellion, the Nazranians sent a letter to Imam Shamil in which they asked him for help, but Shamil failed twice to break through the Russian forces and was forced to retreat with heavy losses. The rebellion was later suppressed, and its leaders were either executed or exiled.

=== Chronology of major events ===
- March 1840 – The Nazranians, together with the Karabulaks, Galashians, and Chechens, participated in the general uprising in Chechnya.
- July 1840 – The Nazranians participated in the uprising of the Sunzha and Nadterechny Chechens, Galgaï, and Karabulaks, led by naib Akhverdy-Magoma.
- June–July 1858 – Nazran uprising: The Nazranians rebelled against Russia because of the new harsh policies of the tsarist authorities.
- 1865 – After the end of the Caucasian War, some Nazranians were deported to Turkey.

=== Part of the Russian Empire ===
After the end of the Caucasian War, the Nazranians became part of the Ingushskiy Okrug. In 1865, some Nazranians were deported to Turkey. Later, the Nazranians became part of the Vladikavkazsky Okrug, Sunzhensky Otdel and the Nazranovskiy Okrug.

== See also ==
- Galashians
- Khamkhins
- Fyappiy

== Bibliography ==
- Жуков, Е. М.; et al., eds. (1964). "Двинск—Индонезия" [Dvinsk—Indonesia]. Советская историческая энциклопедия. Vol. 5. М.: Советская энциклопедия. col. 1–960.
- Берже, А. П. (1858). Краткий обзор горских племен на Кавказе [Brief overview of the mountain tribes in the Caucasus] (in Russian). Тифлис: Типография Канцелярии наместника кавказского. pp. 1–48.
- Бларамберг, И. Ф. (2010). Историческое, топографическое, статистическое, этнографическое и военное описание Кавказа [Historical, topographical, statistical, ethnographic and military description of the Caucasus] (field research) (in Russian). Translated by Назарова, И. М. Moscow: Издательство Надыршин. pp. 1–402. ISBN 978-5-902744-10-8.
- "Кавказскій край" [Caucasian territory]. Военно-статистическое обозрѣніе Россійской имперіи: издаваемое по высочайшему повеленію при 1-м отделеніи Департамента Генеральнаго штаба [Military Statistical Review of the Russian Empire: published by the highest command at the 1st branch of the Department of the General Staff] (in Russian). Vol. 16: Part 1. St Petersburg: Типографія Департамента Генеральнаго штаба. 1851. pp. 1–274.
- Kolenati, Friedrich (1858). Die Bereisung Hocharmeniens und Elisabethopols, der Schekinschen Provinzund des Kasbek im Central-Kaukasus [Traveling through High Armenia and Elizabethopol, the Shekin Province and Kazbek in the Central Caucasus] (in German). Dresden: Yerlagsbuchhandlung von Rudolf Kuntze. pp. 1–289.
- Мартиросиан, Г. К. (1928). Нагорная Ингушия [Upland Ingushiya] (in Russian). Владикавказ: Государственная типография Автономной Области Ингушии. pp. 1–153.
- Крупнов, Е. И. (1939). "К истории Ингушии" [To the history of Ingushiya]. Вестник древней истории (in Russian). 2 (7). Moscow: 77–90.
- Робакидзе, А. И., ed. (1968). Кавказский этнографический сборник. Очерки этнографии Горной Ингушетии [Caucasian ethnographic collection. Essays on the ethnography of Mountainous Ingushetia] (in Russian). Vol. 2. Тбилиси: Мецниереба. pp. 1–333.
- Крупнов, Е. И. (1971). Средневековая Ингушетия [Medieval Ingushetia] (in Russian). Москва: Наука. pp. 1–211.
- Волконскій, Н. А. (1886). "Война на Восточномъ Кавказѣ съ 1824 по 1834 годы въ связи съ мюридизмомъ" [War in the Eastern Caucasus from 1824 to 1834 in connection with Muridism]. In Чернявскій, И. С. (ed.). Кавказскій сборникъ [Caucasian collection] (in Russian). Vol. 10. Тифлисъ: Типографія Окружнаго штаба Кавказскаго военнаго округа. pp. 1–224.
- Вертепов, Г. А. (1892). "Ингуши. Историко-статистическій очеркъ". In Максимов, Е.; Вертепов, Г. А. (eds.). Туземцы Сѣвернаго Кавказа. Историко-статистическіе очерки. Выпускъ первый. Осетины, ингуши, кабардинцы [Natives of the North Caucasus. Historical and statistical essays. First issue. Ossetians, Ingush, Kabardians] (in Russian). Владикавказъ: Типографія Областнаго правленія Терской Области. pp. 71–138.
- Пантюхов, И. И. (1901). Ингуши: антропологическій очеркъ [Ingush: an anthropological essay] (in Russian). Тифлисъ: Типографія К. П. Козловскаго. pp. 1–35.
- Потто, В. А., ed. (1904). Утвержденіе русскаго владычества на Кавказѣ [The assertion of Russian rule in the Caucasus]. Vol. 3: Part 1. Тифлисъ: Типографія штаба Кавказскаго военного округа. pp. 1–527.
- Ковалевскій, П. И. (1914). Народы Кавказа [Peoples of the Caucasus]. Кавказъ (in Russian). Vol. 1. St Petersburg: Типографія М. И. Акинфіева. pp. 1–346.
- Милютин, Д. А. (1919). Христіани, Г. Г. (ed.). Воспоминанія. Книга 1, 2, 3 [Memorials. Book 1, 2, 3] (in Russian). Vol. 1. Томскъ: Изданіе военной Академіи. pp. 1–458. ISBN 5998998936.
- Шмидт, О. Ю., ed. (1937). "Ингушская автономная область" [Ingush Autonomous Oblast]. Империалистическая война — Интерполяция [Imperialist War - Interpolation]. Большая советская энциклопедия (in Russian). Vol. 28 (1st ed.). Москва: Советская энциклопедия. p. 65.
- Шмидт, О. Ю., ed. (1939). "Наган — Нидерландское искусство" [Nagant - Dutch Art]. Большая советская энциклопедия (in Russian). Vol. 41 (1st ed.). Москва: Советская энциклопедия. pp. 1–450.
- Волкова, Н. Г. (1973). Лавров, Л. И. (ed.). Этнонимы и племенные названия Северного Кавказа [Ethnonyms and tribal names of the North Caucasus] (in Russian). Москва: Наука. pp. 1–210.
- Anchabadze, George (2001). Vainakhs (The Chechen and Ingush). Tbilisi: Caucasian House. pp. 1–76.
- Кузнецов, В. А. (2004). Введение в кавказоведение (историко-этнологические очерки народов Северного Кавказа) [Introduction to Caucasian Studies (Historical and Ethnological Essays on the Peoples of the North Caucasus)] (in Russian). Владикавказ: ИПП им. В. А. Гассиева. pp. 1–184.
- Павлова, О. С. (2012). Ингушский этнос на современном этапе: черты социально-психологического портрета [The Ingush ethnos at the present stage: features of the socio-psychological portrait] (in Russian). Москва: Форум. pp. 1–384. ISBN 9785911346652. OCLC 798995782.
- Зиссерман, А. Л. (1881). История 80го пѣхотнаго генерал-фельдмаршала Кабардинскаго князя Барятинского полка. (1726–1880) [History of the 80th Infantry General-Field Marshal of the Kabardian Prince Baryatinsky Regiment. (1726–1880)] (in Russian). С-Петербургъ: Типографiя В. Грацiанскаго. pp. 1–470.
- Кодзоев, Н. Д. (2002). История ингушского народа. Глава 5. Ингушетия в XIX в. § 1. Ингушетия в первой половине XIX в. Основание Назрани [History of the Ingush people. Chapter 5. Ingushetia in the 19th century § 1. Ingushetia in the first half of the 19th century. Foundation of Nazran] (in Russian). Archived from the original on 2019-07-23.
- Хожаев, Д. А. (1998). Мазаева, Т. (ed.). Чеченцы в Русско-Кавказской войне [Chechens in the Russian-Caucasian War] (in Russian). Грозный-Санкт-Петербург: Седа. pp. 1–250. ISBN 5-85973-012-8. Archived from the original on 2014-12-22.
