= Granat Encyclopedic Dictionary =

Russian encyclopedia

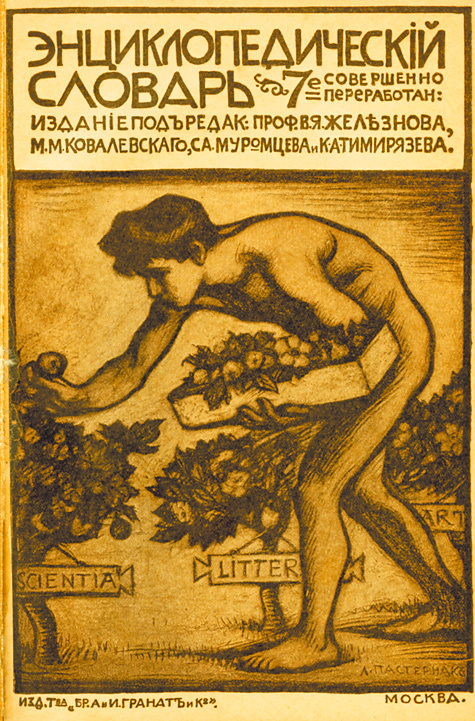
Volume cover by Leonid Pasternak for the dictionary's 7th edition

The Granat Encyclopedic Dictionary (Russian: Энциклопедический словарь Гранат, romanized: Entsiklopedicheskiy slovar' Granat) is a Russian encyclopedic dictionary originally published in 58 volumes with one supplement throughout both the Tsarist and Soviet periods. The dictionary's full title is The Encyclopedic Dictionary of the Granat Russian Bibliographical Institute (Russian: Энциклопедический словарь Русского библиографического института Гранат, romanized: Entsiklopedicheskiy slovar' Russkogo bibliograficheskogo instituta Granat). The word Granat refers to Alexander (1861–1933) and Ignatiy Granat (1863–1941), the brothers who commissioned the articles in their Moscow office.

First appearing in 1910, the dictionary was finally completed in 1948. The first 33 volumes were published in 1910–17 and the remaining volumes from 1922 onwards. The dictionary's large size allowed each entry sufficient space to present relatively full information. Among the dictionary's contributors and editors were Vladimir Lenin, who wrote on Karl Marx, botanist Kliment Timiryazev, anthropologist Dmitry Anuchin, biologist Ilya Mechnikov and economist Alexander Konyus. Unlike the Brockhaus and Efron Encyclopedic Dictionary, the Granat Encyclopedic Dictionary was written primarily by Russian authors.
