= Ashilta =

Ashilta Ашильта Гӏашилтӏа
- Selo
- Location within Republic of Dagestan Location within Russia
- Coordinates: 42°46′N 46°43′E
- Country: Russia
- Region: Republic of Dagestan
- District: Untsukulsky District
- Time zone: UTC+3:00

Ashilta (Russian: Ашильта; Avar: Гӏашилтӏа) is a rural locality (a selo) in Untsukulsky District, Republic of Dagestan, Russia. Population: 1,842 (2021 census); 1,861 (2002 census); 1,124 (1989 Soviet census). There are 8 streets.

== Geography ==
Ashilta is located 27 km northwest of Shamilkala (the district's administrative centre) by road. Chirkata is the nearest rural locality.
