= Galashkinskoe Naibstvo =

Administrative unit of the Caucasian Imamate

Vilayet Kalay ولاية كالاي (Arabic)
- Imamate Province (1840–1851)
- 1840–1851
- Flag

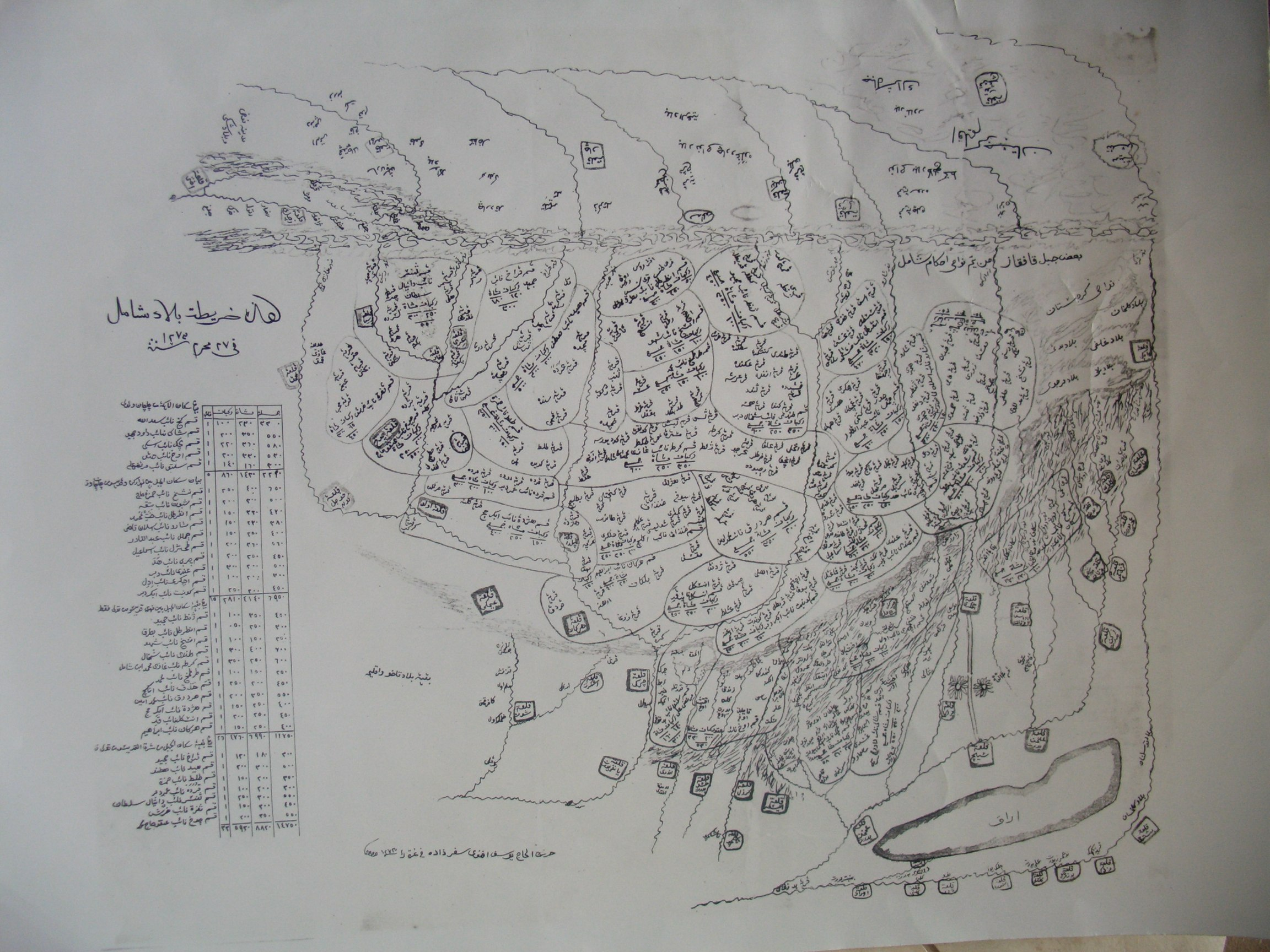
- Galashki on the map of the Caucasian Imamate 27 Muharram 1273 hijri calendar (1856)
- Demonym: Galashians
- Government
- Naib
  - 1846–1848: Naib Dudar (first)
  - 1848–1851: Muhammad-Mirza Anzor (last)
- Historical era: Early modern period
  - Established: 1840
  - Disestablished: 1851
Succeeded by
Russian Empire

Galashkinskoe Naibstvo, self-designated as Vilayet Kalay (Arabic: ولاية كالاي), (Note: The name by which it was indicated as in the documents and letters of Caucasian Imamate. Infrequently indicated as Vilayat Kalayish.) was an Ingush administrative unit of the Caucasian Imamate. The Naibstvo was the farthest region of the Imamate in the west and it was established on the territory of Galashian society.

== Name ==
The district in Russian terminology is known as Galashkinskoe Naibstvo or Galashkinskiy Vilayet. Officially, in the documents and letters of Caucasian Imamate, which the district was part of, it was designated as Vilayet Kalay. (Note: The Galashian Society itself was also indicated as Kalay (Arabic: كلاي).) The Arabic toponym Kalay itself corresponded to the name Galash, another variant for the name of Galashians.

== History ==
The Galashians became part of the Caucasian Imamate in March 1840, when they together with the Karabulaks (Orstkhoy) participated in the uprising of Chechnya and with their deputies together with Chechens solemnly swore allegiance to Imam Shamil in the large center village of Lesser Chechnya, Urus-Martan. (Note: According to Igor Karpeev, this was achieved thanks to the Naib Akhberdil Muhammed.) The naibstvo was an Ingush administrative unit of the Imamate.

In 1851 the Naibstvo was disestablished when it was conquered by the Russian Empire.

== Naibs ==
- Naib Dudarov, apparently an Ossetian (Tagaur) Aldar, who in April 1846 went over to the side of the Imamate.
- Muhammad Anzorov-Mirza (1848-1851), a Kabardian Naib.

== See also ==
- Caucasian Imamate
- Galashians

== Bibliography ==
- Alieva, Sevindzh (2010). Bagirova, Irada (ed.). Азербайджан и народы Северного Кавказа (XVIII-начало XXI вв.) [Azerbaijan and the peoples of the North Caucasus (18th –beginning of the 21st centuries)] (in Russian). Baku: Şərq-Qərb. pp. 1–620. ISBN 978-9952-34-565-0.
- Alieva, Sevindzh (2017). Bagirova, Irada (ed.). Взаимоотношения Азербайджана и народов Северного Кавказа (XIX – начало XX вв.) [Relations between Azerbaijan and the peoples of the North Caucasus (19th – early 20th centuries)] (in Russian) (2nd ed.). Baku: IPO Turkhan. pp. 1–456.
- Ramazanov, Khidir; Shigabudinov, Magomed; Shikhsaidov, Amri (1990). "Борьба горцев Дагестана и Чечни за независимость" [The struggle of the highlanders of Dagestan and Chechnya for independence]. In Gamzatov, Gaji (ed.). Народно-освободительное движение горцев Дагестана и Чечни в 20-50-х годах XIX в: Всесоюзная научная конференция, 20-22 июня 1989 г.: тезисы докладов и сообщений [The people's liberation movement of the highlanders of Dagestan and Chechnya in the 20-50s of the XIX century: All-Union Scientific Conference, June 20–22, 1989: abstracts of reports and messages]. Makhachkala: Dagestani Book Publishing House. pp. 12–28. ISBN 5-297-00058-0.
- Dadaev, Yusup (2009). Наибы и мудиры Шамиля [Naibs and mudirs of Shamil] (in Russian). Makhachkala: DINEM. pp. 1–621. ISBN 978-5-91446-011-9.
- De-Sazhe (1902). "Покорение Галашек" [Conquest of Galashki]. Military Collection (in Russian) (2). St. Petersburg: Typography of the Main Directorate of Departments – via Wikisource.
- Gumashvili, Labaz (2015). "Анализ конституции Шамиля" [Analysis of Shamil's constitution]. Northern Caucasian Juridical Herald (in Russian) (2): 26–44.
- Karpeev, Igor (2000). "Наиб Ахбердилав" [Naib Akhberdilav]. Rodina (in Russian). No. 14. Moscow: Publisher of "Pravda".
- Kodzoev, Nurdin (2002). "Глава 5" [Chapter 5]. История ингушского народа [History of the Ingush people] (in Russian). Magas, Ingushetia: Serdalo. Archived from the original on 2019-07-23.
- Арабоязычные документы эпохи Шамиля [Arabic-language documents of the Shamil era] (in Russian). Translated by Sharafutdinova, Rukiya. Moscow: The Oriental Literature of RAS. 2001. ISBN 5020181358.
- Pavlova, Olga (2012). Ингушский этнос на современном этапе: черты социально-психологического портрета [The Ingush ethnos at the present stage: features of the socio-psychological portrait] (in Russian). Moscow: Forum. pp. 1–384. ISBN 9785911346652. OCLC 798995782.
- Rzhevusky, A. (1888). Терцы. Сборник исторических, бытовых и географическо-статистических сведений о Терском казачьем войске [Terekians. Collection of historical, everyday, geographical and statistical information about the Terek Cossack army] (in Russian). Vladikavkaz: Typography of the Regional Board of the Terek Region. pp. 1–292.
- Khozhaev, Dalkhan (1998). Mazaeva, Tamara (ed.). Чеченцы в Русско-Кавказской войне [Chechens in the Russian-Caucasian War] (in Russian). Grozny-St. Petersburg: Seda. pp. 1–250. ISBN 5-85973-012-8. Archived from the original on 2014-12-22.
- Sharafutdinova, Rakiya (1974). "Арабские письма Шамиля из архива Б. А. Дорна" [Arabic letters of Shamil from the archive of B. A. Dorn] (PDF). In Main editorial office of oriental Literature of RAS (ed.). Письменные памятники Востока. Историко-филологические исследования. Ежегодник 1970 [Written monuments of the East. Historical and philological research. Yearbook 1970] (in Russian). Moscow: Nauka. pp. 204–225.
