= Muhammad-Mirza Anzor =

Circassian commander and a naib of Caucasus Imamate

- Андзор Мухьэмэд-Мырзэ

Naib of Imamate Province of Vilayet Kalay
- In office 1848–1851
- Preceded by: Naib Dudarov
- Succeeded by: Office abolished

Naib of Imamate Province of Vilayet Arshtkhoy
- In office 1848–1851
- Succeeded by: Office abolished

Personal details
- Born: Muhammad-Mirza; 1804 Anzorei, Kabardia
- Died: 19 June 1851 (aged 46–47) Gekhi, lesser Chechnya, Caucasian Imamate

Military service
- Allegiance: Kabardia (Russian Empire) Russia (formerly); Caucasian Imamate
- Branch/service: Army
- Years of service: 1825-1851
- Rank: General
- Commands: Cavalry
- Battles/wars: Caucasus War

Muhammad-Mirza Anzor (Kabardian: Андзор Мухьэмэд-Мырзэ), was a Kabardian military and political figure, a mudir (general-naib) of the Caucasian Imamate, and a leading figure in the resistance against Russian imperial expansion during the Caucasian War. Coming from the noble Kabardian Anzor family, he played a critical role in uniting Circassian and Chechen forces against Russian colonial policies.

== Early life and background ==
Born in the village of Anzorei in Kabarda in 1804, Muhammad-Mirza belonged to a prominent Kabardian noble family that held significant land near the confluence of the Terek and Uruq rivers. During the Russian conquest of Kabarda, he was taken as a hostage (amanat) in 1822. By the 1840s, Muhammad served as a Russian officer, holding ranks up to lieutenant and serving on the Kabardian court and in delegations to the Russian Emperor.

Despite his formal ties to the Russian administration, Muhammad opposed Russian colonial expansion and increasingly identified with the cause of resistance led by Imam Shamil.

== Defection to the Imamate ==
In April 1846, Muhammad joined Imam Shamil, the leader of the Caucasian Imamate, accompanied by 37 Kabardian princes, nobles, and a large group of peasants. His defection marked a turning point, signaling the discontent of Kabardian elites with Russian rule. Muhammad and his followers moved to Chechnya, where they reinforced Shamil's forces.

On August 22, 1846, Muhammad was appointed naib (governor) of the Gekhi district in Lesser Chechnya, and he became the leader of a hundred Circassian (Kabardian) muhajirs. His appointment demonstrated Shamil's trust in him as a capable military and administrative leader.

== Role in the Caucasian War ==
Banner of Muhammad-Mirza.

Muhammad's tenure as naib coincided with one of the most challenging periods of the Caucasian War. Russian forces intensified their campaigns, isolating mountain societies and constructing military lines to cut off supplies and reinforcements. Despite these challenges, Muhammad led fierce battles to defend villages, particularly in the Arshtkhoy and Gekhi regions.

In March 1849, Imam Shamil elevated him to the position of mudir (governor) of Lesser Chechnya. Under his leadership, Circassian and Chechen fighters carried out daring raids, including repeated breaches of the Russian fortifications along the Sunzha line. These operations inflicted heavy losses on Russian forces and underscored Muhammad's military prowess.

== Death and legacy ==
On June 15, 1851, during a battle near Nurikoevskaya Polyana against a detachment led by Major General Nikolai Sleptsov, Muhammad sustained severe injuries. He succumbed to his wounds four days later, on June 19, 1851. His death marked the loss of a key leader for the Caucasian resistance.

Muhammad-Mirza Anzor remains a symbol of Kabardian resistance and a testament to the unity among North Caucasian peoples during the struggle against imperial domination. His efforts to protect the autonomy of his homeland and his commitment to the cause of the Imamate are remembered as significant contributions to the history of the Caucasian War.
