= Caucasian Imamate =

1828–1859 state in the North Caucasus

North Caucasian Imamate إمامة شمال القوقاز (Arabic) Imāmat Shamal al Qawqāz
- 1828–1859
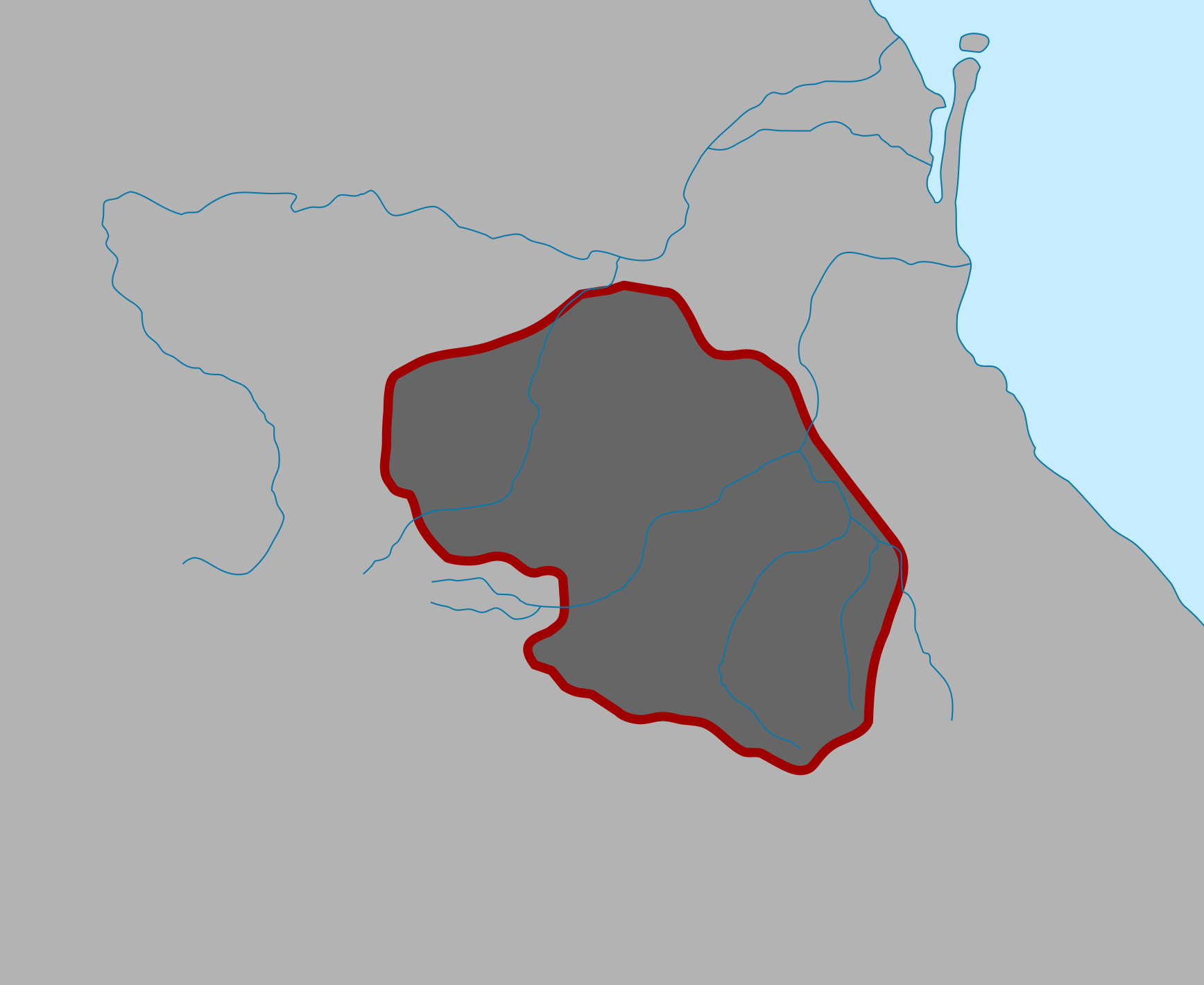
- Map of the Caucasian Imamate in 1854
- Status: Imamate
- Capital: Gimry (Under Ghazi Muhammad); Gotsatl, Khunzakh (Under Hamzat Bek); Ashilta, Akhulgo, Dargo, Vedeno (Under Imam Shamil)
- Common languages: Arabic^{[1]} Chechen, Avar and Kumyk^{[2]} Northeast Caucasian languages^{[3]} Northwest Caucasian languages
- Religion: Sunni Islam
- Demonym: North Caucasian
- Imam
  - 1828–1832: Ghazi Muhammad
  - 1832–1834: Hamzat Bek
  - 1834–1859: Imam Shamil
  - March – April 1918: Najmuddin Hotso
- Historical era: Caucasian War
  - The Gazawat begins, the Imamate is established to combat the Russians: 1828
  - Overthrown by the Russian Empire: 1859
Preceded by	Succeeded by
Chechen Dominion	Mountain Republic
- Today part of: Russia
- 1. official, administrative, and religious language.; 2. documents and correspondence languages.; 3. Incl. Dargin, Lezgin, Tsakhur, Lak, Tabasaran, Rutul, Aghul, and others.

The Caucasian Imamate, also known as the North Caucasian Imamate (Arabic: إمامة شمال القوقاز, romanized: Imāmat Shamal al-Qawqāz), was a state founded by Muslim imams in the early-to-mid 19th century across Dagestan and Chechnya. After uniting Chechen and Avar tribes It emerged during the Caucasian War (1817–1864) as a resistance movement against the Russian Empire's expansion into the region. The Imamate sought to unify the diverse peoples of the North Caucasus under a centralized Islamic governance structure, implementing sharia law to consolidate political and military opposition to Russian rule.

Russia, aiming to secure its southern frontiers and stabilize communication routes to its newly acquired territories in the South Caucasus (modern-day Georgia, Armenia, and Azerbaijan), sought to annex the North Caucasus. The Imamate became the primary force opposing this conquest, enduring decades of conflict before its eventual dissolution following the capture of its final leader, Imam Shamil, in 1859.

== Background ==
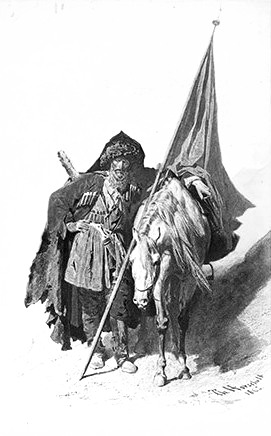
Murid with the Naib Banner by Theodor Horschelt, 1858–1861

The Northeast Caucasus historically comprised numerous states. Caucasian Albania, centered in southern Dagestan, existed as a vassal state under the Parthian and later Sasanian Empires for much of its history. In the Early Middle Ages, the Turkic Khazars conquered the region. Following the Muslim conquest of Persia in the 7th century, the region's majority adopted Islam, mirroring their Persian overlords. Arab travelers played a pivotal role in spreading the religion, and their eventual withdrawal led to the emergence of Islamic polities such as Lezghia (centered in Derbent, a hub of Islamic scholarship) and Lakia (based in Kumukh, a rival scholarly center), alongside smaller neighboring entities. In ethnically diverse southern and southeastern Dagestan, where intercommunal tensions were common, Islam served as a unifying force, with clerics often mediating disputes.

In Chechnya, Islam held weaker roots compared to other regions of the future Imamate. The faith began gaining traction only in the 16th century, coexisting with the indigenous Vainakh religion, which retained dominance until the early 19th century. Large-scale conversion occurred under the threat of Russian expansion, as Chechens mobilized under Islamic identity to resist imperial encroachment. Sheikh Mansur, an 18th-century leader, spearheaded this religious-political movement. However, subsequent leaders like Imam Shamil found Chechen adherence to Islamic practices inconsistent, with pagan traditions persisting in some areas.

Despite Islam's unifying role in anti-Russian resistance, political Islam faced significant challenges. In central/northern Dagestan and Chechnya, the Naqshbandi Sufi order dominated religious life, but its mystical traditions sparked internal debates over the appropriateness of political engagement. Efforts to impose sharia law encountered resistance from multiple factions:

- Local rulers, including Avar, Kumyk, Lezgin, and Lak leaders, viewed sharia as a threat to their authority. Notably, Pakhu Bike, the ruling widow of the Khanate of Avaria, opposed its implementation.
- Adat (traditional customary law) held precedence over sharia for many communities, particularly Chechens, who regarded it as better suited to their social norms.

Consequently, while the Imamate positioned itself as a bulwark against Russian conquest, its authority in claimed territories often rested on being perceived as the lesser evil compared to direct imperial rule.

== Establishment ==
By the late 1820s, growing resentment against Russian imperial policies—including oppressive taxation and military activity—led segments of the Muslim population in Dagestan to radicalize. Calls for a ghazawat (holy war) and the implementation of sharia law intensified. In 1827, Imam Ghazi Muhammad and Imam Shamil, two influential religious leaders, attempted to launch this campaign by attacking Khunzakh, the capital of the Khanate of Avaria, then ruled by Pakkou-Bekkhe. The assault failed, forcing the imams to regroup and consolidate support among fractious Muslim tribes.

In 1828, Ghazi Muhammad and Shamil renewed their efforts, this time focusing on northern Dagestan. The Russian Empire, which controlled the region, struggled to adapt its conventional European battlefield tactics—reliant on linear formations—to the Caucasus' dense forests and mountainous terrain. The imams' use of guerrilla warfare proved decisive, securing a victory that marked the beginning of sustained resistance. This conflict, later termed the Caucasian War, would escalate into a decades-long struggle ending with Russian annexation of the Caucasus.

Following their success, Ghazi Muhammad proclaimed himself the first leader of the Caucasian Imamate. The imamate's governance was structured around a State Council (Dīvān), composed of Sufi scholars, Islamic students, and military commanders known as naibs (lieutenants).

== Expansion ==
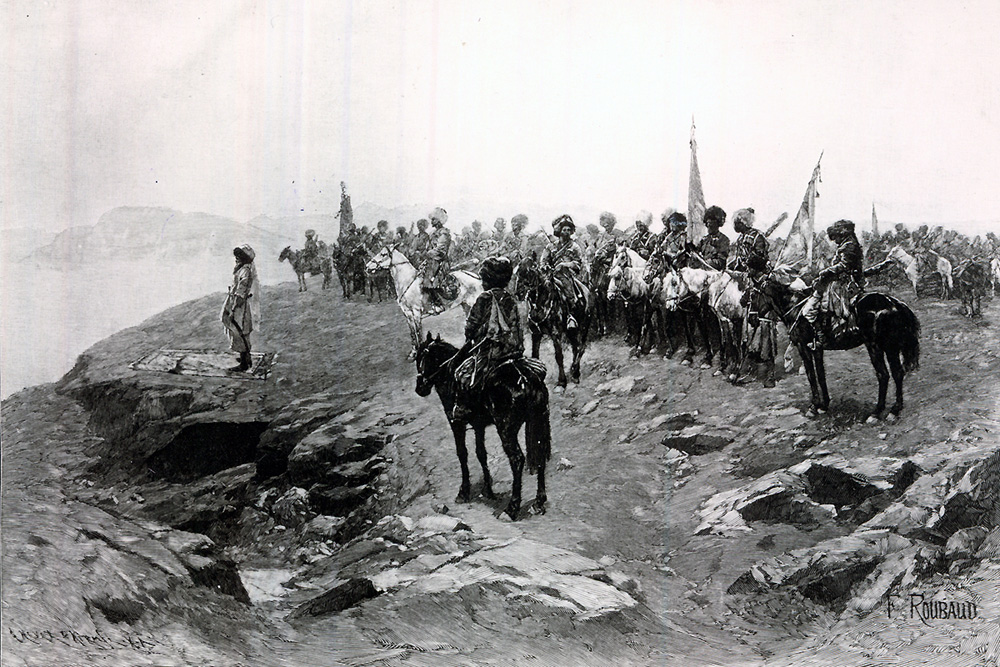
Chamil's prayer before the battle (On horseback murid), by Franz Roubaud 1896.

Under Imam Shamil's leadership, the Caucasian Imamate expanded significantly during the Caucasian War, gaining support from Muslim tribes across the region. By the mid-19th century, it consolidated control over Chechnya, parts of Ingushetia, and most of Dagestan. Shamil later extended his authority westward, incorporating Adyghe tribes (Circassians) into the Imamate.

A strategic challenge emerged due to the geographic separation between Shamil's eastern and western territories, which were divided by lands inhabited by Kabardians and Ossetians. To administer these fragmented regions, Shamil relied on his Naibs (Lieutenants) rather than the central Dīvān (Council). These deputies governed the western tribes directly, ensuring cohesion despite the lack of a contiguous territorial base.

== Politics ==
The Caucasian Imamate was led by three successive imams during its existence:

- Imam Ghazi Muhammad (1828–1832), the founding leader, established the Imamate's governance structure.
- Imam Hamzat Bek (1832–1834) succeeded Ghazi Muhammad but was assassinated in 1834 by a faction that included the defector Hadji Murad, a former ally.
- Imam Shamil (1834–1859), the longest-reigning and most influential leader, oversaw the Imamate's territorial peak, extending its authority across the Muslim-majority regions of the North Caucasus.

The Imamate's governance was centrally focused on military and religious objectives, shaped by its perpetual state of war with the Russian Empire. Political decisions revolved around advancing Islamic law (sharia) and coordinating resistance during the Caucasian War (1817–1864). The State Council (Dīvān), the Imamate's ruling body, exclusively comprised Muslim scholars (ulema) and naibs (military-administrative deputies), reflecting its dual emphasis on religious legitimacy and martial strategy.

== The war and the surrender of the Imamate ==
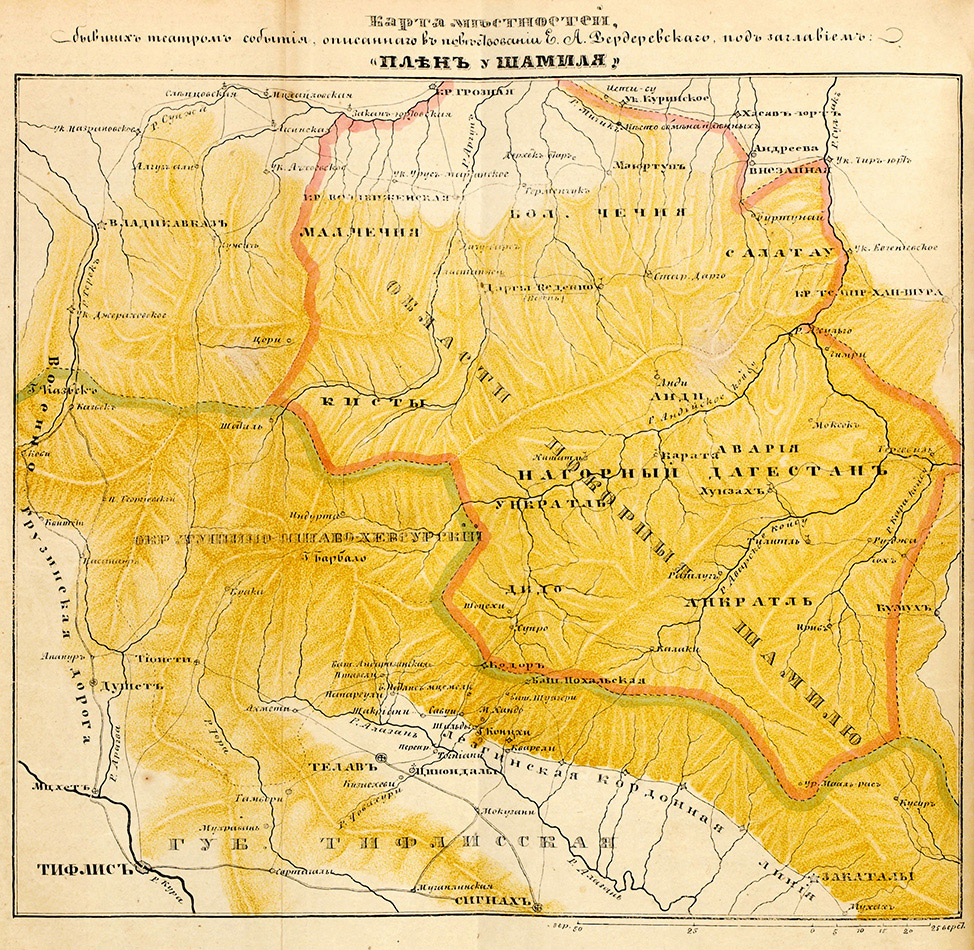
Map of Imamate in 1856.

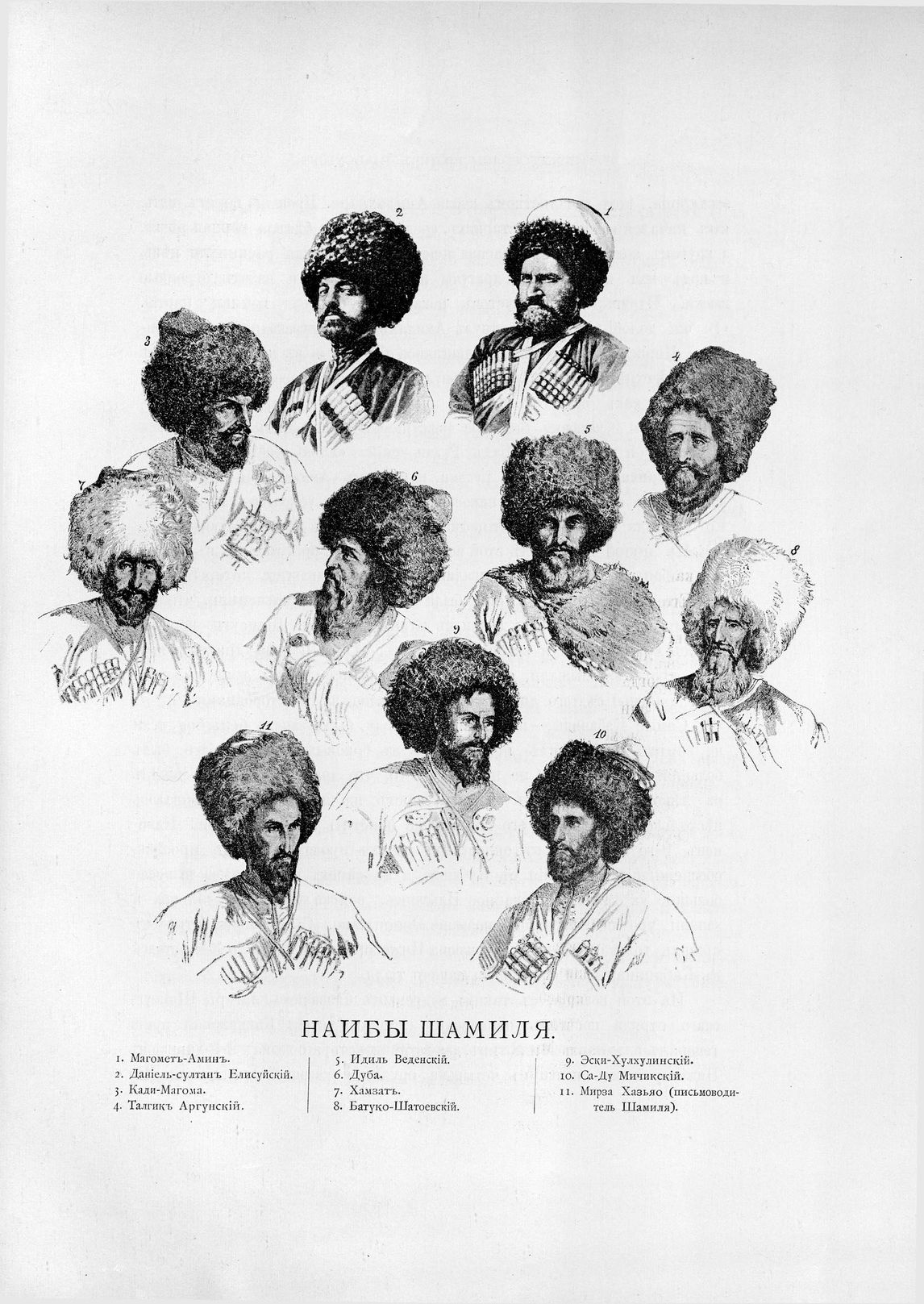
Naibs of Imam Shamil by Giorgio Corradini, 19th century

The Caucasian Imamate initially achieved significant victories against the Russian Empire, though early Russian military efforts were limited. Following its triumph over Napoleon in 1812, Russia initially dismissed the North Caucasian resistance as a minor "Asiatic" conflict. However, escalating Imamate successes prompted a full-scale Russian counteroffensive. In 1832, Imam Shamil and Ghazi Muhammad launched an unsuccessful attack on Vladikavkaz, a Russian fort whose name derived from Russian: влад-, romanized: vlad-, lit. 'rule' + Russian: Кавказ, romanized: Kavkaz, lit. 'Caucasus', lit. 'to rule the Caucasus'.

In response, Russian General Aleksei Aleksandrovich Velyaminov besieged Gimry, the Imamate's de facto capital, in October 1832. The battle resulted in the town's capture, Ghazi Muhammad's death, and Shamil's narrow escape. Presumed dead, Shamil retreated into hiding.

=== Leadership transition ===
From 1832 to 1834, Imam Hamzat Bek—a former naib (deputy) to Shamil and Ghazi—ruled the Imamate. Hamzat Bek had previously secured the allegiance of the Avar Khanate, but his assassination in 1834 by Avar loyalists paved the way for Shamil's return. Shamil assumed leadership in 1834, ruling for 25 years (1834–1859) and becoming the Imamate's most influential imam.

=== Shamil's rule and decline ===
Shamil sought British support during the Great Game, but no formal alliance materialized. He unified fractious western Muslim tribes and transformed the Imamate into a centralized state. However, devastating losses—notably the Siege of Akhoulgo (1839) in Dagestan, which claimed approximately 4,500 lives—weakened his forces.

In 1859, after decades of resistance, Emperor Alexander II of Russia offered Shamil honorable surrender terms, including exile in Kaluga near Moscow. Shamil accepted, dissolving the Imamate. Sporadic fighting continued, but organized resistance collapsed.

=== The fate of Imam Shamil ===
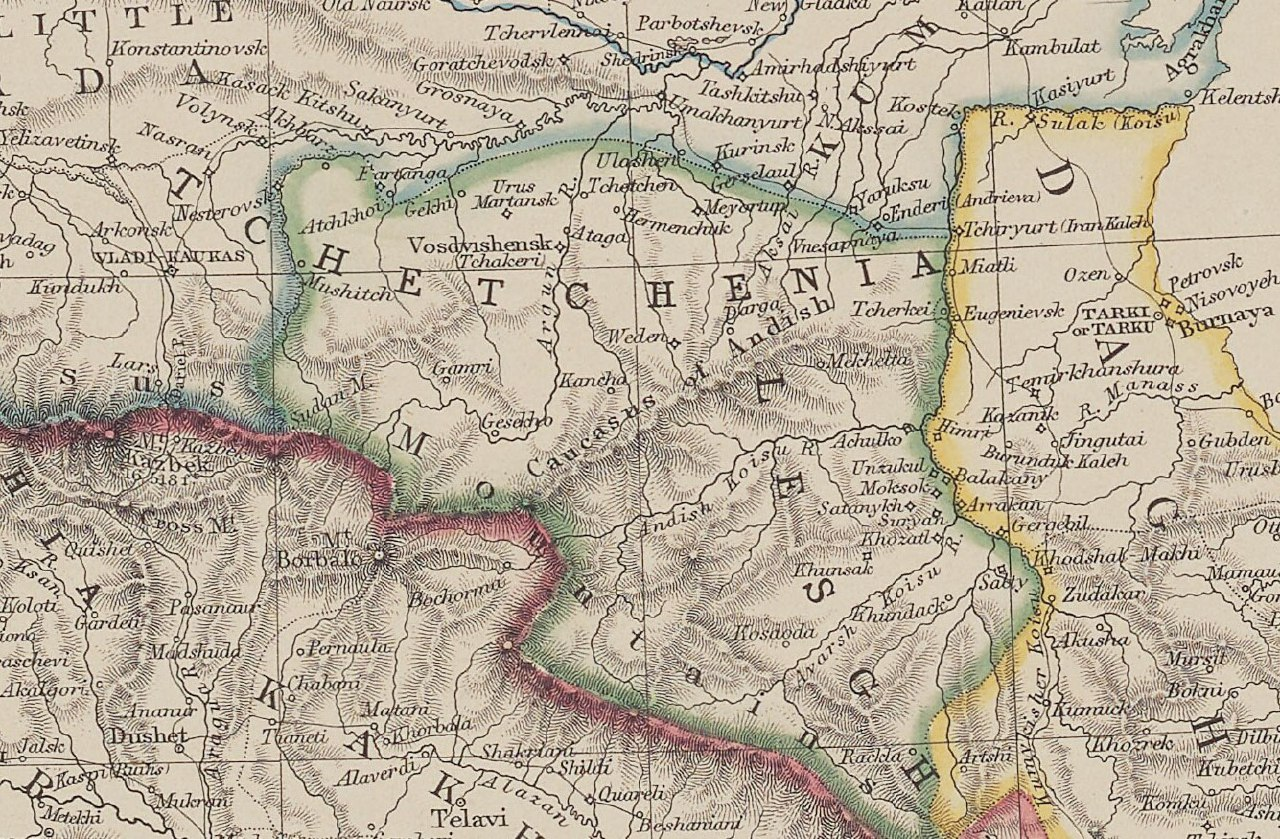
Map of the Caucasian Imamate, by Edward Weller (cartographer) 1884.

Historian Charles King notes:

Whereas previous enemies of the empire had been imprisoned, killed or exiled, Shamil became a national celebrity [in Russia]. After his surrender, he settled into a comfortable retirement in Kaluga, southeast of Moscow.

In 1859, Shamil wrote to his son:

By the will of the Almighty, the Absolute Governor, I have fallen into the hands of unbelievers... the Great Emperor... has settled me here... in a tall, spacious house with carpets and all the necessities.

== Fourth Imamate ==
Following the Russian Revolution of 1917, an attempt to revive the Caucasian Imamate occurred between March and April 1918, led by Najmuddin Hotso—son of a former naib (deputy) under Imam Shamil. Hotso, whose surname derived from the Dagestani settlement of Gotsob (where he had been granted nobility under the Tsarist regime), was proclaimed the fourth Imam of the North Caucasus. With limited support confined to Dagestan, he briefly overthrew local Soviet authorities but was swiftly defeated by Red Army forces.

Meanwhile, in Chechnya, anti-Soviet resistance fragmented into various nationalist factions, many of which engaged in guerrilla warfare against Russian and Bolshevik forces. Both the Dagestani and Chechen uprisings were fully suppressed by 1925.

== See also ==
- Caucasian War
- Murid War
- Galashkinskoe Naibstvo
- Mountainous Republic of the Northern Caucasus (1917–1922)
- North Caucasian Soviet Republic (1918)
- North Caucasian Emirate (1919–1920)
- Mountain Autonomous Soviet Socialist Republic (1921–1924)
- Confederation of Mountain Peoples of the Caucasus (1989–2000)
- Caucasus Emirate (2007–2016)
