= 2009 Nazran bombing =

Largest terrorist attack of the 21st century in Ingushetia, Russia

Coordinates: 43.2167°N 44.7667°E

- A map of Russia, showing the Republic of Ingushetia (highlighted)
- Location: Nazran, Ingushetia (Russia)
- Date: August 17, 2009; 9:08 (UTC+3)
- Target: Police station
- Attack type: Suicide attack
- Deaths: 25
- Injuries: 164
- Perpetrator: Caucasus Emirate

The 2009 Nazran bombing occurred on 17 August 2009, in Nazran, the largest city of the Republic of Ingushetia in the Russian Federation. A suicide car bomber attacked police headquarters, and at least 25 people were killed and 164 injured. It was the most serious terrorist attack in Ingushetia in the early 21st century, where there had been social and political unrest related to independence movements.

This explosion was one of the most deadly in Ingushetia since the turn of the 21st century and showed the revitalizing prospect of insurgency forces operating on the lands of the North Caucasus. This incident occurred at the period when the instability was gaining momentum in the region, as violence in the region was spreading to Ingushetia after it had spread to the adjacent Chechnya and Dagestan.

The militant Islamist Caucasus Emirate claimed responsibility for the attack.

== Attack ==
At 9:08 a.m.(MSK) on 17 August 2009, an unidentified militant drove a GAZelle truck into the gates of a police headquarters building in Nazran, Ingushetia's largest city. The attack occurred as police officers were lining up nearby for a morning briefing. Policemen fired at the car, but were unable to stop it. The blast, which reportedly had the force of 400 kg of dynamite, created a crater 4 metres (13 ft) wide and 2 metres (6.6 ft) deep, damaged the police headquarters building and nearby apartments. It also caused ammunition stored in the police headquarters to explode. Twenty people were reported to have been killed and 138 were injured. The toll later rose to 25 killed and 164 wounded, with 15 of the dead being Russian policemen and 10 being Ingush.

Witnesses have seen that the explosion followed shortly after 9 a.m. when the police were conducting their morning roll call in the courtyard. The blast obliterated vehicles parked in areas near the headquarters and smashed windows in the neighborhood near the headquarters. President Dmitry Medvedev condemned the attack the same day as an incident of odd cruelty during a briefing broadcast on the TV.

According to the Republic's Deputy Interior Minister Zyaudin Dourbekov, police had received information on August 15 that a vehicle of this type was going to be used in a suicide bombing, but were unable to prevent the attack.

== Investigation and perpetrators ==
The Russian security agencies issued an arrest of Ali Taziyev or Magas, the leader of a key command of the Caucasus Emirate militant network, in 2010. The officials claim that Taziyev took part in plotting and planning the bombing of Nazran as a component of a bigger operation of assaulting the police and governmental facilities in Ingushetia. According to the police, his capture was a major milestone in getting things done to help break militants in the region.

== Aftermath ==
The Ingush authorities announced a three-day mourning period. They promised to pay 100,000 rubles ($3,000 USD) and 50,000 rubles ($1,500 USD) in compensation to the families of those killed or injured. Russia's Ministry of Emergency Situations dispatched a plane to Ingushetia carrying medical specialists and aid for the victims. Following the attack, Russian President Dmitry Medvedev sacked Ingush Interior Minister Ruslan Meiriyev, saying that the attack could have been prevented. "This is the outcome not only of the problems related to terrorist attacks, but also of the republic law enforcement agencies' unsatisfactory work," Medvedev said. German Chancellor Angela Merkel offered condolences to those affected by the attack.

According to Vladimir Markin, a spokesman for the Prosecutor General's Office, the most likely motives for the bombings are revenge for the work carried out by the police against militants or an attempt to destabilize the situation in the region. On 18 August Alexander Bastrykin said that the Federal Security Service (FSB) received information about the organizers of the attack. He refused to name the suspects at this stage, but said that they belonged to the same groups that had conducted similar attacks in recent years. Bastrykhin assured that the FSB was doing everything it can to solve the crime.

President Medvedev put Deputy Interior Minister of Russia, Colonel-General Arkady Yedelev in charge of all security and police operations in Ingushetia. The pro-administration President of Ingushetia, Yunus-bek Yevkurov, who had survived an assassination attempt in June 2009, said the rebels' goal was to "destabilize the situation and spread panic" in Ingushetia and claimed that the West had a hand in the escalation in the North Caucasus with the aim to prevent Russia from reviving "its former Soviet might".

On 19 August, President Dmitry Medvedev said that the continuing attacks against Ingush leadership, law enforcement officials and civilians must be dealt with severe punishment. He said that although external factors such as foreign funding for Islamist terrorists are also a concern, for the most part North Caucasus' security problems are the results of internal reasons such as corruption and socio-economic problems. "The roots are in the structure of our life, in unemployment, clans who could not care less about people and whose only concern is to how to divide the money poured in here, to get a contract and to settle scores with one another later, as well as corruption, which has really become very widespread among law enforcement authorities."

In the months following the bombing, the federal forces stepped up activities in counterinsurgency in Ingushetia, both in terms of the number of security checkpoints and the deployment of more forces to the interior. Despite these measures, the republic was characterized by the fact that over several years, the level of political violence was high, which was indicative of the fact that the local insurgent networks were still strong.

On 21 August, the militant Islamist Caucasus Emirate group claimed responsibility for the attack.

== Background ==
In 2009, the violence grew in the North Caucasian republics of Russia and terrorist attacks became more frequent. Although Chechen separatist activity was confirmed to be diminished due to the heavy-handed security measures undertaken by Chechen President Ramzan Kadyrov, violence in Chechnya has been replaced by Islamic insurgency in the neighbouring republics, Dagestan and Ingushetia.

After the June attempt on President Yevkurov's life, there had been several incidents just days before the Nazran attack on 17 August. Several other leading Ingush officials have been assassinated since June 2009, including Deputy Chief Justice of the Supreme Court Aza Gazgireeva, former Deputy Prime Minister Bashir Aushev, the head of the Forensics and Investigations Center Magomed Gadaborshev, and Construction Minister Ruslan Amerkhanov.

== See also ==
- 2004 Nazran raid
- List of terrorist incidents, 2009
- Insurgency in Ingushetia
- North Caucasus Insurgency 2009
- August curse
