= Mikhail Motsak =

Russian naval officer (1949–2019)

Mikhail Vasilyevich Motsak
- Born: 22 November 1949; Moscow, Russia SFSR, USSR
- Died: 19 October 2019 (aged 69) Saint Petersburg, Russia
- Allegiance: USSR; Russia
- Branch: Soviet Navy; Russian Navy
- Service years: 1967–2001
- Rank: Vice-Admiral
- Awards: Hero of the Russian Federation; Order "For Merit to the Fatherland" Fourth Class; Order of Honour; Order "For Personal Courage"; Order of the Red Star; Order "For Service to the Homeland in the Armed Forces of the USSR" Third Class

Mikhail Vasilyevich Motsak (Russian: Михаил Васильевич Моцак; 22 November 1949 – 19 October 2019) was a high-ranking career officer of the Soviet and Russian Navies.

Born in Moscow, Motsak grew up in Sevastopol, attending the P. S. Nakhimov Black Sea Higher Naval School and starting his naval career as an engineer in the Pacific Fleet. Rising through the ranks to more senior positions, he served on submarines in various roles, transferring to the Northern Fleet and his own submarine commands in 1982. Commended for his performance, Motsak graduated to various staff positions in the fleet, was promoted to rear-admiral in 1993 and became commander 1st Submarine Flotilla in 1993. In 1994 he was awarded the title of Hero of the Russian Federation. In May 1999 Motsak was appointed Chief of Staff and First Deputy Commander of the Northern Fleet.

Part of his duties included organising the fleet's exercises for summer 2000, the first in a decade. During the exercises the submarine Kursk suffered a series of catastrophic explosions and sank. Motsak was deeply involved in rescue attempts to reach the stricken submarine before officials learned that the entire crew of 118 had died. He commanded the salvage operation the following year. Motsak was among the fleet's officers to be criticised in the subsequent investigation into the disaster.

He was demoted and forced to resign. He became deputy to the Presidential Envoy to the Northwestern Federal District for a time. Later he worked in the private sector with marine engineering companies. Over his career he had received several awards in addition to the title of Hero of the Russian Federation, including the Order "For Merit to the Fatherland" Fourth Class, the Order of Honour and the Order "For Personal Courage". He died in 2019 and was buried in the Serafimovskoe Cemetery in his home city of Saint Petersburg.

== Early life and career ==
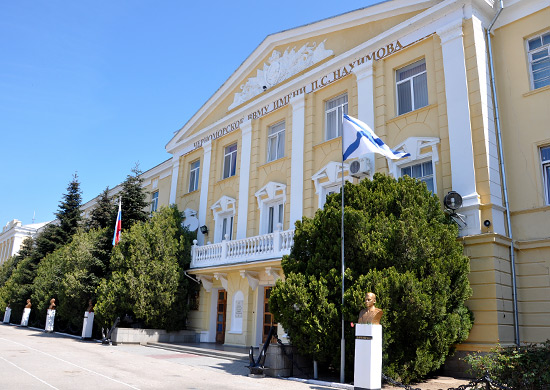
The P. S. Nakhimov Black Sea Higher Naval School, where Motsak studied in the 1970s

Motsak was born on 22 November 1949 in Moscow, then part of the Russian Soviet Federative Socialist Republic in the Soviet Union. His family moved to Sevastopol during his childhood, and Motsak grew up and attended high school there. After graduating from high school, he enrolled in the P. S. Nakhimov Black Sea Higher Naval School. He graduated in 1972 with a specialty in submarine missile guidance systems, and was assigned to serve as a senior engineer in the Pacific Fleet. After service in shore-based weapons installations as engineer and then senior engineer, Motsak transferred to the submarine service. Between 1974 and 1979 he was promoted from armament commander to assistant commander, and then senior assistant commander of a nuclear submarine. He completed the Higher Special Officer Classes of the Navy in 1982.

Motsak was next assigned to the Northern Fleet, where from 1982 he commanded the K-517. During his time in command, the K-517 received several commendations for excellence, and for two years received the title of the best submarine in the navy. From August 1985 until 1991, Motsak was deputy commander of the 33rd submarine division of the Northern Fleet. During this time he attended the A. A. Grechko Naval Academy, graduating in 1987 with the award of a gold medal.

In June 1991 he became commander of the 11th submarine division. On 18 February 1993 he was promoted to rear-admiral. In August 1993 he was appointed chief of staff of the 1st Submarine Flotilla, and in December the following year was appointed the flotilla's commander. On 15 June 1994 he was awarded the title of Hero of the Russian Federation, with the accompanying Gold Star "for courage and heroism shown in the performance of military duty". In August 1995 he oversaw a missile-firing exercise from a Typhoon-class submarine at the North Pole, commanded by Aleksandr Bogachyov. On 22 February 1996 he was promoted to vice-admiral.

== Chief of Staff of the Northern Fleet ==
In May 1999 Motsak was appointed Chief of Staff and First Deputy Commander of the Northern Fleet. He had by this stage of his career served on 24 long-distance voyages, sailing a total of 390,000 miles. Among the operations he undertook were two trans-arctic voyages to transfer submarines of the Northern Fleet to the Pacific. The first was in August and September 1991, during which two submarines, the K-173 and the K-449, were transferred. In the second, the K-456, under the command of Captain 1st Rank Arkady Yefanov, was transferred between 18 August and 14 September 1993.

=== Loss of the Kursk ===
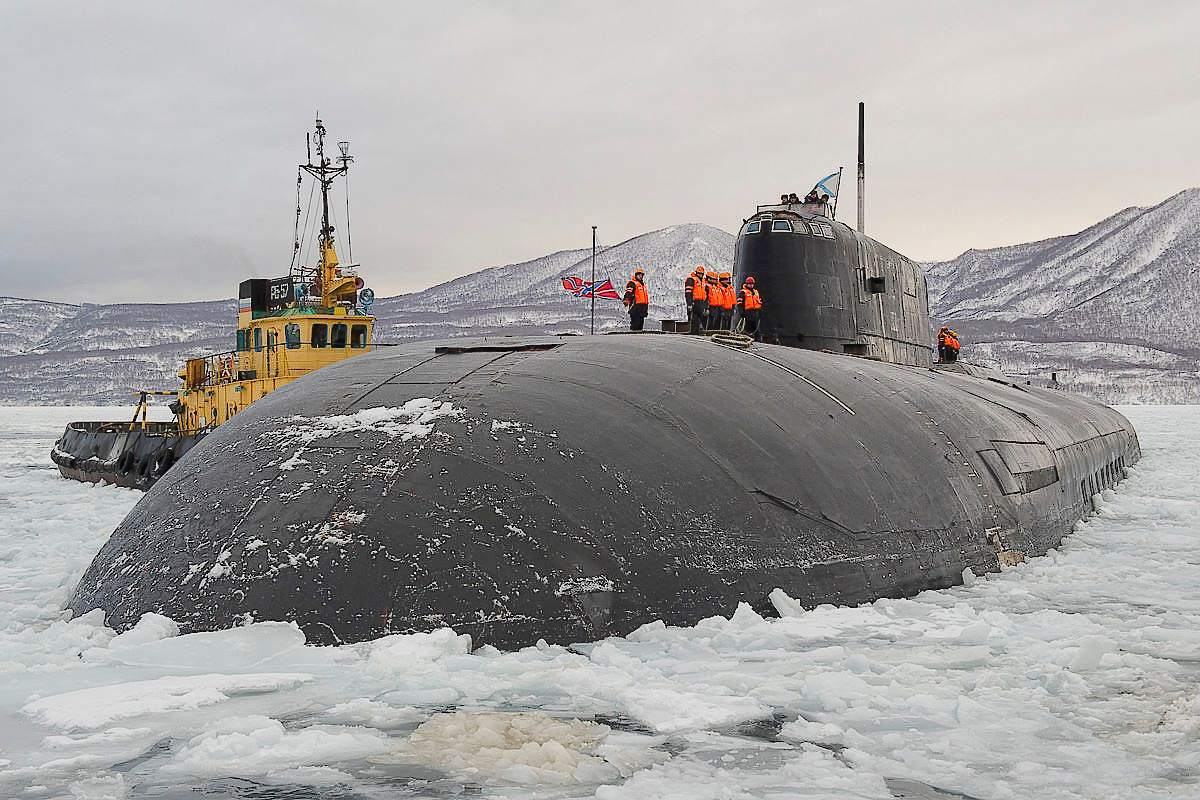
An Oscar II-class submarine, of the same class as the Kursk

As chief of staff of the Northern Fleet, Motsak had responsibility for planning the exercises that were to take place in summer 2000. Several submarines were assigned to the exercises: the Borisoglebsk, Karelia, Leopard, Obninsk, Daniil Moskovsky, and the Oscar II-class Kursk. The exercises were overseen by Northern Fleet commander Admiral Vyacheslav Popov, 1st Submarine Flotilla commander Vice-Admiral Oleg Burtsev, and Vice-Admiral Yuri Boyarkin, the fleet's deputy commander for combat training, all based aboard the Northern Fleet's flagship, the battlecruiser Pyotr Velikiy. On 11 August the crew of the Kursk, led by Captain 1st Rank Gennady Lyachin, carried out a test launch of a Granit cruise missile.

The next morning Kursk was preparing to fire a practice torpedo at the Pyotr Velikiy. A hydrogen peroxide leak in the torpedo caused it to explode while in the forward torpedo compartment, starting a fire and destroying two compartments. The ship sank to the seabed where within a few minutes the fire caused the remaining torpedoes to detonate. This destroyed much if the front part of the Kursk, killing most of the 118 crew members. The nuclear generators shut down safely. Some 23 survivors gathered from the aft compartments into the last, ninth compartment of the submarine to await rescue.

Some hours after the explosion, concerned at the Kursk's failure to report in, Popov ordered Motsak to alert the fleet's rescue forces. Six hours after the Kursk's sinking, Motsak ordered the fleet's rescue vessel, the Mikhail Rudnitsky to come to one-hour readiness to put to sea. An hour later Motsak ordered five Ilyushin Il-38s to begin searching the exercise area, subsequently supplementing the effort with six helicopters. It is believed that most of the crew died within 6 hours of the explosions, before the sub was even identified as missing. Motsak was due to give a press conference on 15 August, four days after the Kursk sank. He was replaced at the last minute by Igor Baranov, of the Rubin Design Bureau, which had designed Kursk. It was not until 20 August that Motsak admitted that the Russian Navy had no deep sea, saturation divers, using this as justification to accept aid from foreign navies.

On 21 August divers were finally accessed the submarine and opened the aft escape hatch. They confirmed that there were no survivors from the 118 men who had been aboard. Motsak announced the news. "Our worst expectations are confirmed. All sections of the submarine are totally flooded and not a single member of the crew remains alive." Motsak was one of a number of officers who suggested that a foreign submarine had collided with the Kursk and caused the disaster. During the recovery of bodies, a note written by Dmitry Kolesnikov, the senior ranking survivor of the initial explosions, was found. In a televised announcement from fleet headquarters at Severomorsk, Motsak announced the recovery of the first bodies from the wreck, and a summary of the contents of the note.

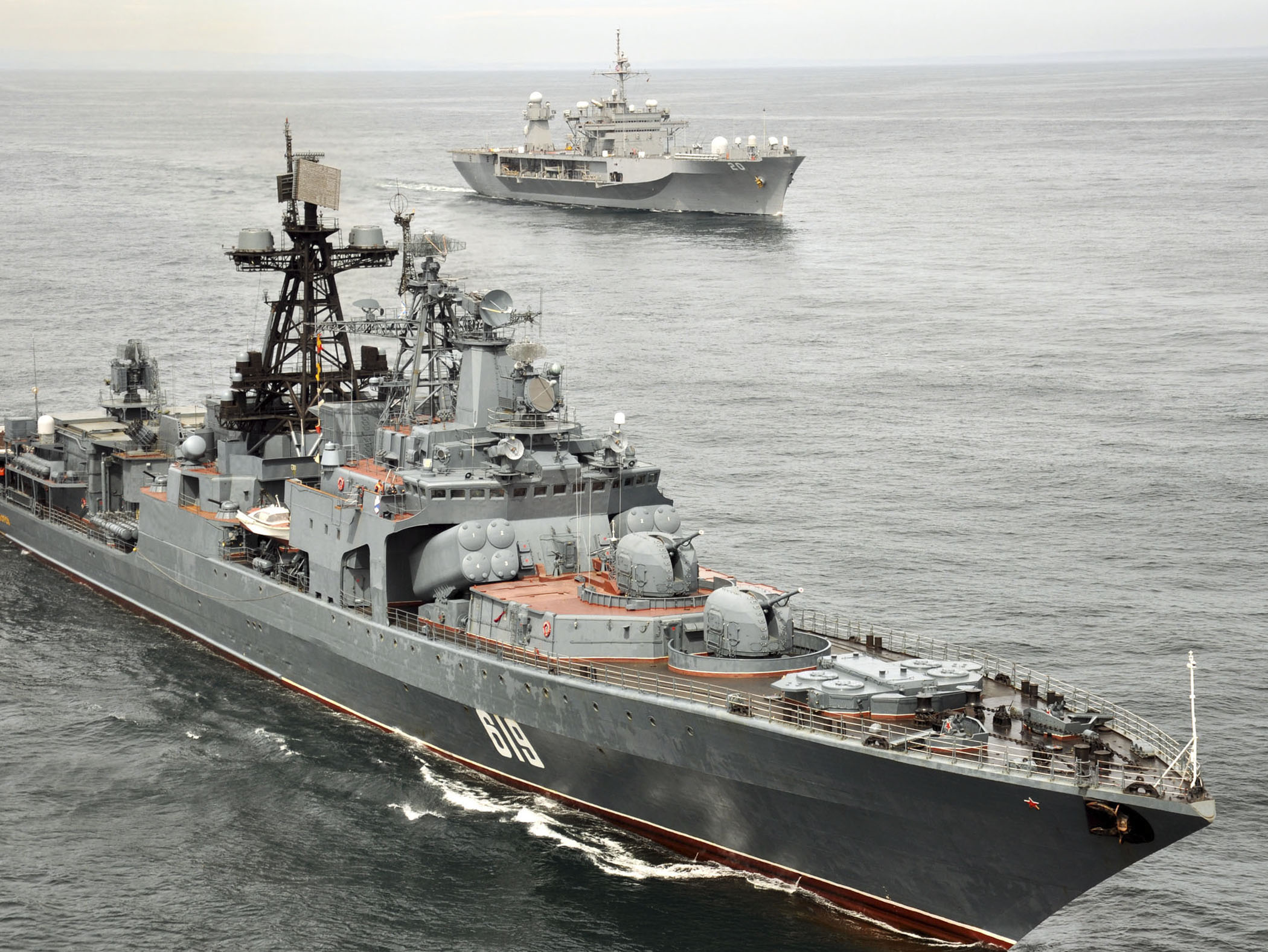
The Severomorsk, Motsak's flagship during the salvage operation

Motsak oversaw the salvage operation to raise the wreck of the Kursk between July and October 2001, with the Udaloy-class destroyer Severomorsk as his flagship. Motsak said that "the first and main reason to raise the Kursk is to get the nuclear reactors off the seabed. Secondly, we have to raise it to fulfil our human obligation to all those who died on board and to give them a respectable burial." After extensive preparations, Kursk was lifted from the seabed in the early hours of 7 October 2001. Prior to the lifting, Motsak had honoured an old naval tradition by spitting three times over his left shoulder. Reflecting on the hazardous nature of the operation, he said to the assembled experts that "once we reach the shore, we will have a good drink, according to Russian custom." The salvage operation was a success, and the wreck being safely brought into Roslyakovo on 10 October.

A subsequent investigation led by Prosecutor General Vladimir Ustinov laid part of the blame for the tragedy on Motsak, and Captain 1st Rank Teslenko, chief of the Northern Fleet's submarine rescue service. The investigation criticised the lack of proper training. On 1 December 2001 Motsak was demoted, along with Admiral Popov and Vice-Admiral Oleg Burtsev, the commander of the 1st Submarine Flotilla, while eleven other senior naval officers were sacked. Motsak was relieved of his post and forced to resign.

== Retirement ==
In January 2002, now retired from the navy, Motsak was appointed deputy to the Presidential Envoy to the Northwestern Federal District. He served in this role under Ilya Klebanov from 2004 until 2012. In 2009 both Motsak and Klebanov were implicated in a political scandal related to the use of the historic cruiser Aurora as a venue for parties for VIPs. Captain 1st rank Anatoly Bazhanov of the Aurora was subsequently sacked.

After serving as deputy to the Presidential Envoy, Motsak entered the private sector. He became head of Marine Integrated Systems LLC, and from 2015 was CEO of a private company involved in the construction of ships, boats and floating structures.

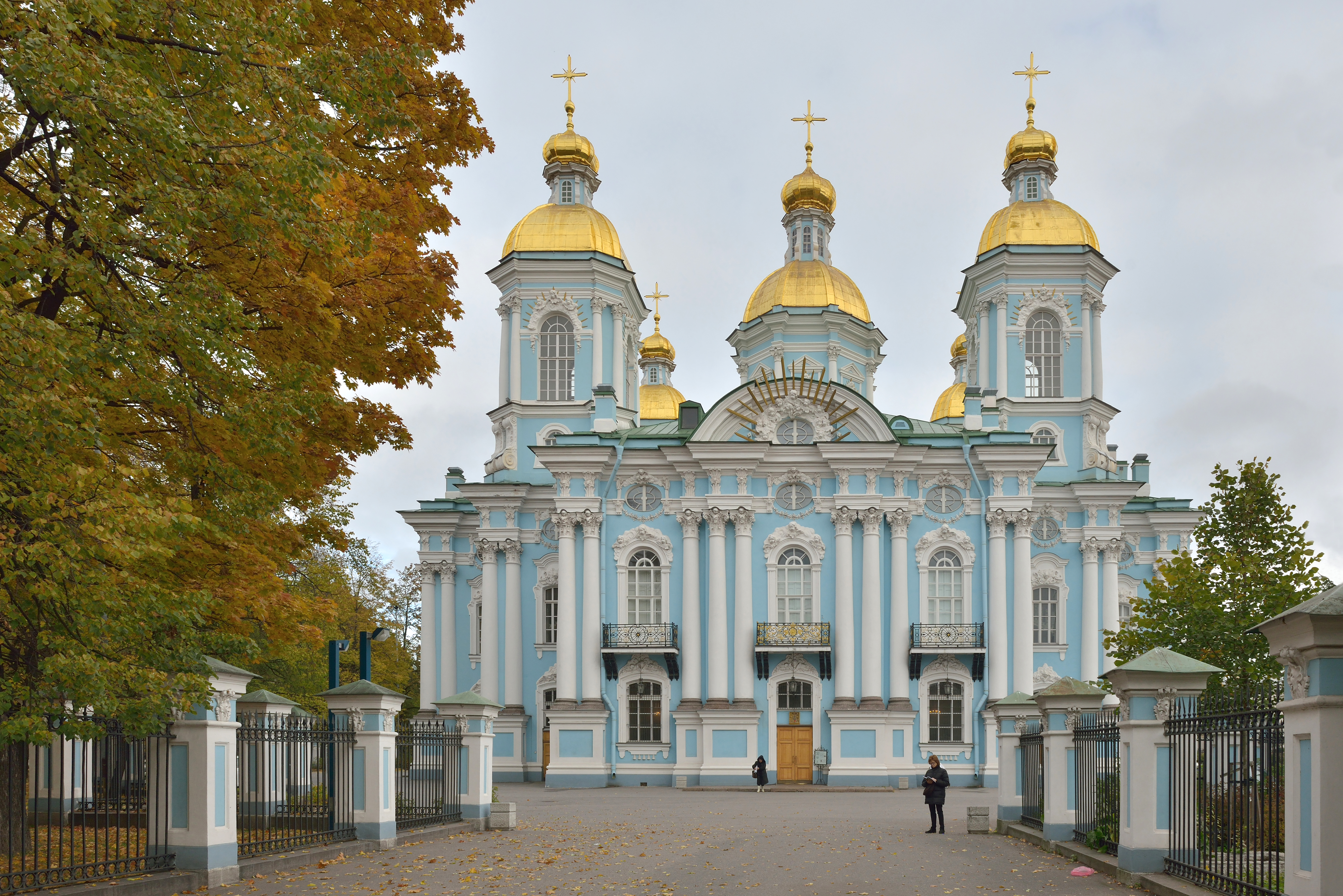
The St. Nicholas Naval Cathedral in Saint Petersburg, where Motsak's memorial service was held

Motsak died in Saint Petersburg on 19 October 2019. His death was announced by the Saint Petersburg Navy Sailors and Veterans Club, who said that he had died at the S.M. Kirov Military Medical Academy "after a serious and prolonged illness". The incumbent commander of the Northern Fleet, Vice-Admiral Aleksandr Moiseyev, expressed his condolences. Retired admiral Vladimir Valuyev stated that Motsak was a "real submariner, a competent specialist and a caring commander." A funeral service was held at the St. Petersburg Naval Institute on 22 October, with a second service later that day at the St. Nicholas Naval Cathedral. Motsak was buried in Serafimovskoe Cemetery in Saint Petersburg, the same cemetery where many of the Kursk crewmen were interred.

Over his career he had received, in addition to the award of Hero of the Russian Federation, the Order "For Merit to the Fatherland" Fourth Class in 1998, the Order "For Personal Courage" in 1993, the Order of Honour on 10 May 2009, the Order of the Red Star in 1980, the Order "For Service to the Homeland in the Armed Forces of the USSR" Third Class in 1984, and fifteen medals. He was also awarded the Honoured Polar Explorer Badge and had been made an honorary citizen of the town of Zaozyorsk.

== See also ==
- List of Heroes of the Russian Federation
