= Strand jack =

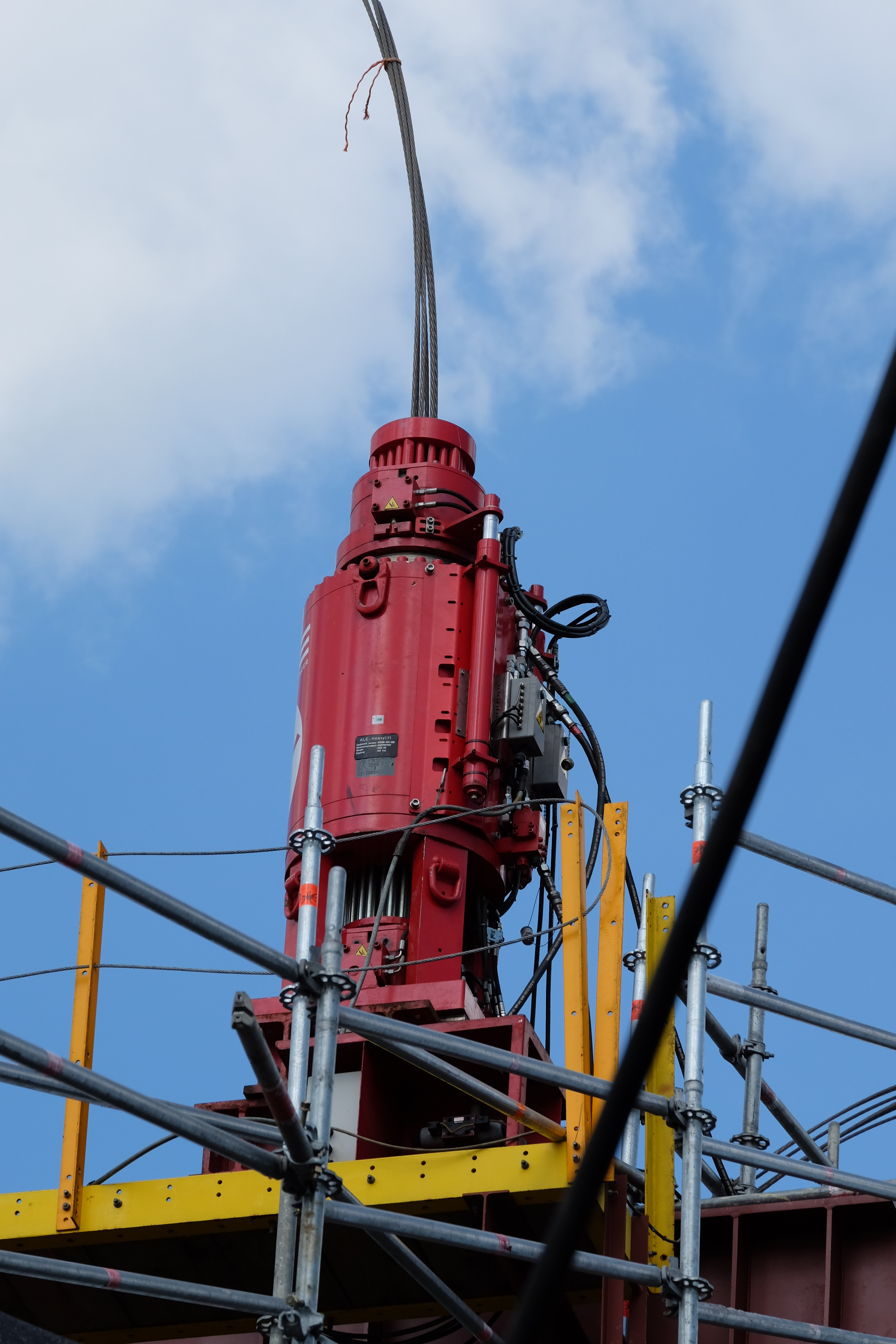
Strandjack at Freybridge in Berlin–Spandau 52° 30′ 42,11″ N, 13° 12′ 11,7″ O

A strand jack (also known as strandjack) is a jack used to lift very heavy loads (e.g. thousands of tons or more with multiple jacks) for construction and engineering purposes. Strandjacking was invented by VSL Australia's Patrick Kilkeary & Bruce Ramsay in 1969 for concrete post tensioning systems, and is now widely used for heavy lifting, to erect bridges, offshore structures, refineries, power stations, major buildings and other structures where the use of conventional cranes is either impractical or too expensive.

== Use ==
Animation of a strand jack

Strand jacks can be used horizontally for pulling objects and structures, and are widely used in the oil and gas industry for skidded loadouts. Oil rigs of 38,000 t have been moved in this way from the place of construction on to a barge. Since multiple jacks can be operated simultaneously by hydraulic controllers, they can be used in tandem to lift very large loads of thousands of tons. Tandem use of even two cranes is a very difficult operation.

== How it works ==
A strand jack is a hollow hydraulic cylinder with a set of steel cables (the "strands") passing through the open centre, each one passing through two clamps - one mounted to either end of the cylinder.

The jack operates in the manner of a caterpillar's walk: climbing (or descending) along the strands by releasing the clamp at one end, expanding the cylinder, clamping there, releasing the trailing end, contracting, and clamping the trailing end before starting over again. The real significance of this device lies in the facility for precision control.

The expansion and contraction can be done at any speed, and paused at any location. Although a lone jack may lift only 1700 tons or so, there exist computer control systems that can operate 120 jacks simultaneously, offering fingertip feel movement control over extremely massive objects.

== In construction ==
Strand jacking is a construction process whereby large pre-fabricated building sections are carefully lifted and precisely placed. The alternative would be to do all assembly in situ, even if expensive, technically risky, or dangerous.

Strand jacks used for heavy lifting and skidding operations are owned and operated by a large number of construction and heavy lifting companies around the world. They are manufactured by a small number of companies based in Europe.

== Notable uses ==
- Kursk submarine disaster
- Erection of the London Eye wheel.

Uses outside of construction

- Costa Concordia disaster, in the ship salvage phase.
