= Magomed Gadaborshev =

Russian military officer (died 2009)

Magomed Gadaborshev (Russian: Магомед Гадаборшев) (? – July 9, 2009) was a Russian-Ingushetian colonel who headed Ingushetia's Forensics and Investigations Center.

On July 7, 2009, attackers opened fire on Gadaborshev's car as he drove through the city center of Nazran, the largest city in Ingushetia. He suffered gunshot wounds in the attack and fell into a coma. Doctors pronounced Gadaborshev dead on July 9, 2009.

Gadaborshev's killing followed a string of attacks on and assassinations of Ingush officials in the preceding weeks. The President of Ingushetia, Yunus-Bek Yevkurov, was seriously wounded in a bombing on June 22, 2009. The deputy chief justice of the Supreme Court of Ingushetia Aza Gazgireeva and former deputy prime minister Bashir Aushev were also assassinated in separate shootings in June 2009.
