= Kursk submarine disaster =

2000 submarine accident in the Barents Sea

- Wreck of Kursk in a floating dock at Roslyakovo, 2002.

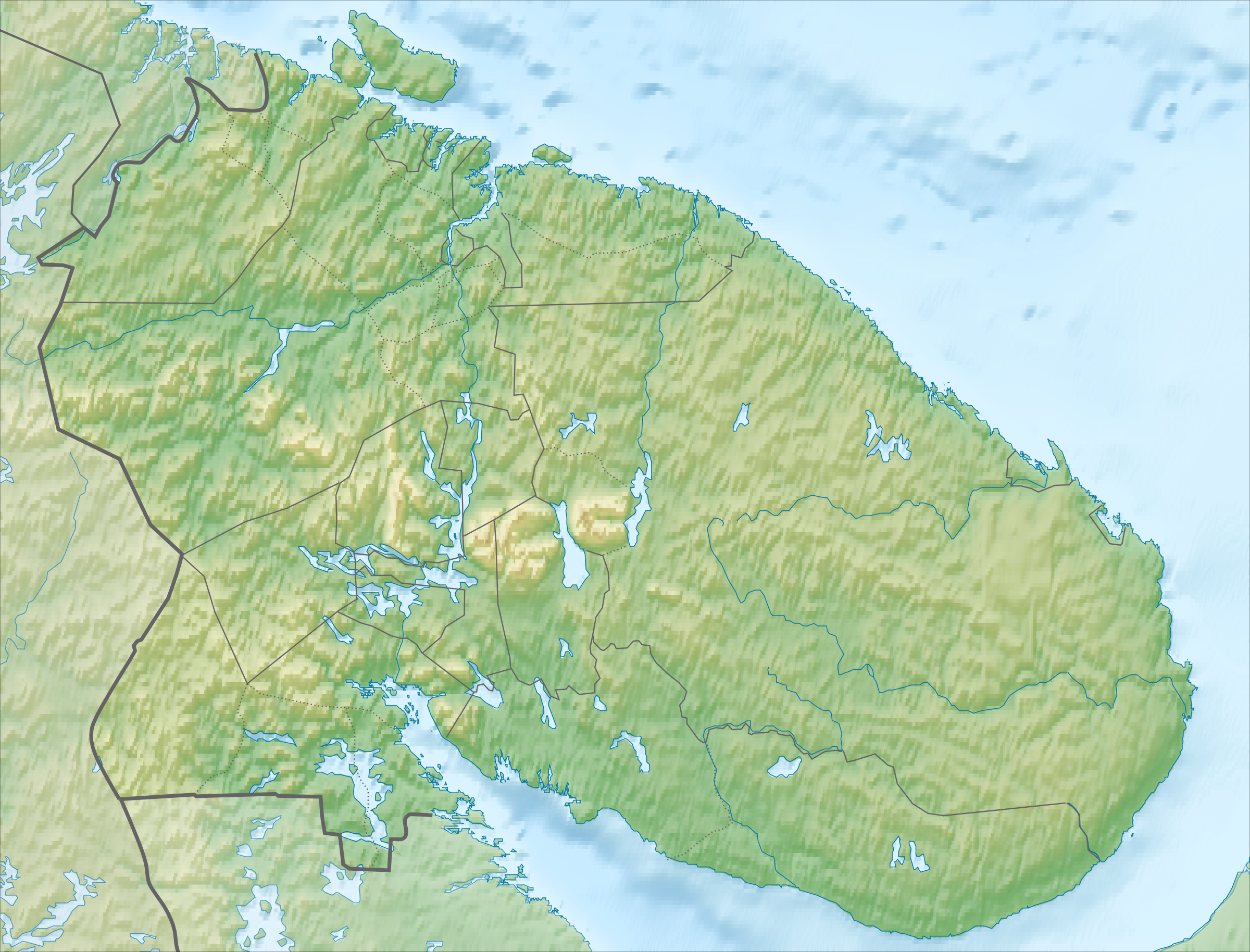
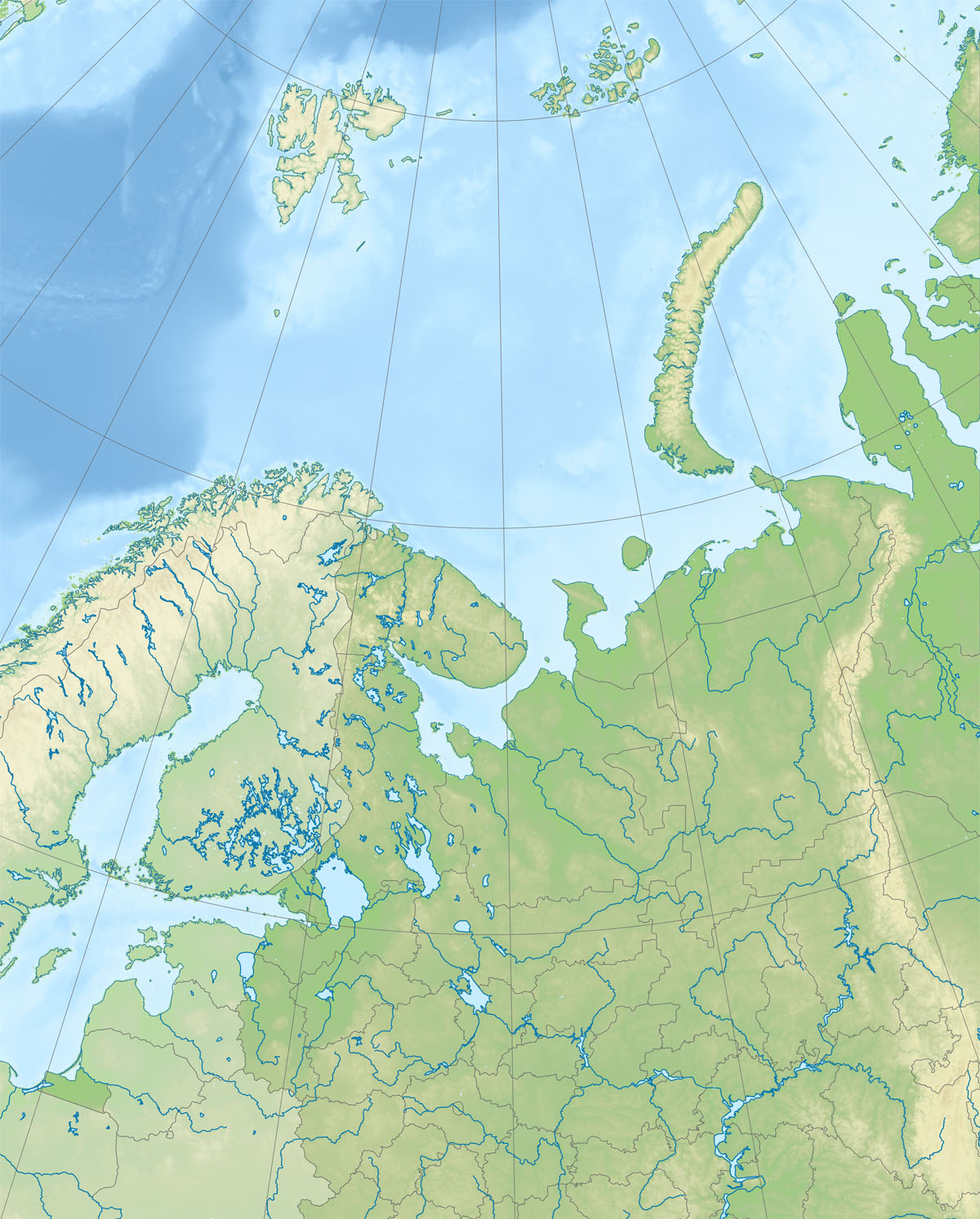
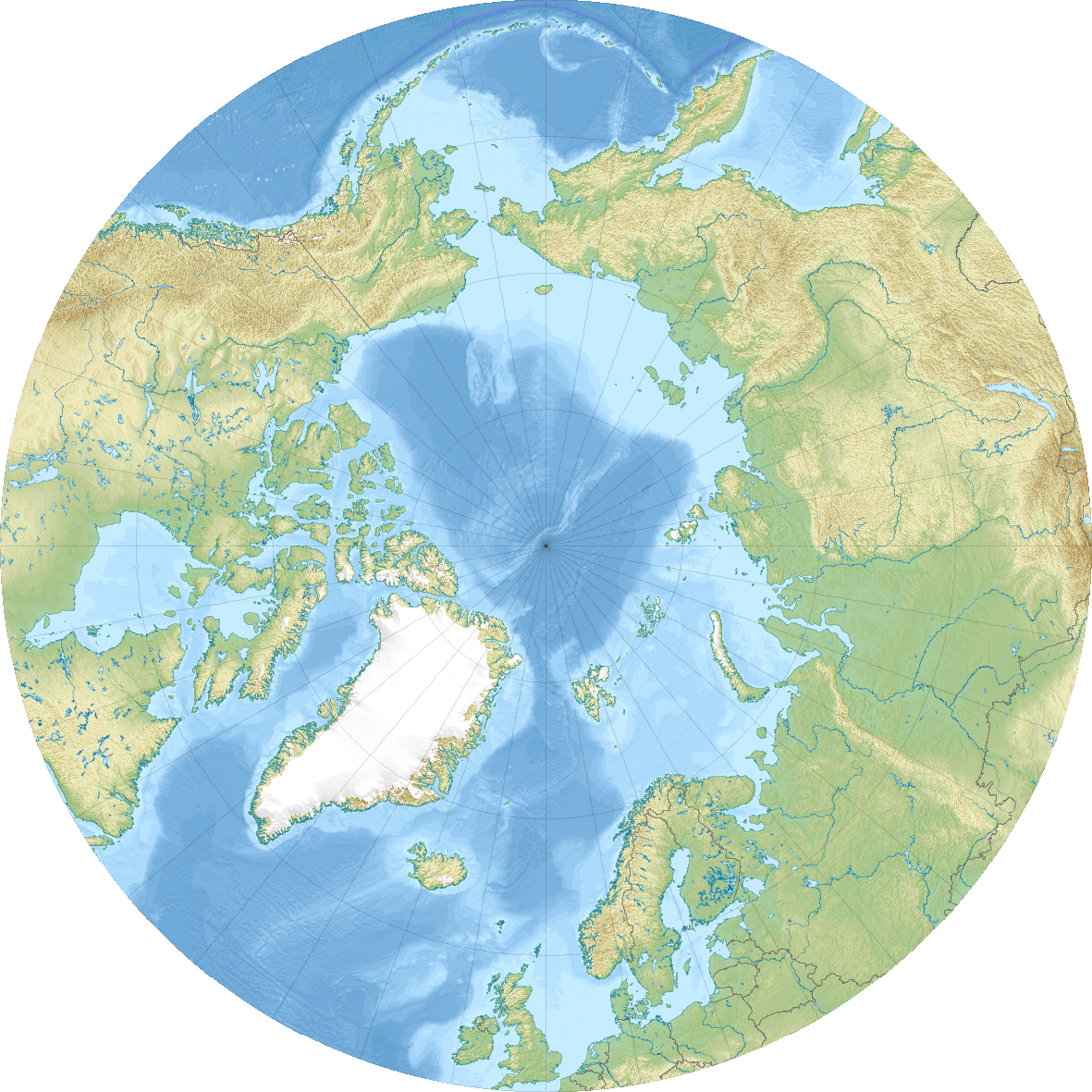
- Kursk (Murmansk Oblast) Kursk (Northwestern Federal District) Kursk (Arctic)
- Date: 12 August 2000
- Time: 11:29:34–11:31:48 a.m. (UTC+04:00)
- Location: Barents Sea; 69°36′59″N 37°34′30″E
- Cause: Faulty weld on a 65-76 "Kit" practice torpedo, leading to an explosion of high-test peroxide and secondary detonation of 5 to 7 torpedo warheads
- Outcome: Loss of the boat, crew, headquarters personnel
- Deaths: 118 (all)
- Convictions: None

The Russian nuclear submarine K-141 Kursk sank in an accident on 12 August 2000 in the Barents Sea, with the death of all 118 personnel on board. The submarine, which was of the Project 949A-class (Oscar II class), was taking part in the first major Russian naval exercise in more than 10 years. The crews of nearby ships felt an initial explosion and a second, much larger explosion, but the Russian Navy did not realise that an accident had occurred and did not initiate a search for the vessel for over six hours. The submarine's emergency rescue buoy had been intentionally disabled during an earlier mission; it took more than 16 hours to locate the submarine, which rested on the ocean floor at a depth of 108 metres (354 ft).

Over four days, the Russian Navy repeatedly failed in its attempts to attach four different diving bells and submersibles to the escape hatch of the submarine. Its response was criticised as slow and inept. Officials misled and manipulated the public and news media, and refused help from other countries' ships nearby. President Vladimir Putin initially continued his vacation at a seaside resort in Sochi and authorised the Russian Navy to accept British and Norwegian assistance only after five days had passed. Two days later, British and Norwegian divers finally opened a hatch to the escape trunk in the boat's flooded ninth compartment, but found no survivors.

An official investigation concluded that when the crew loaded a dummy 65-76 "Kit" torpedo, a faulty weld in its casing leaked high-test peroxide (HTP) inside the torpedo tube, initiating a catalytic explosion. The torpedo manufacturer challenged this hypothesis, insisting that its design would prevent the kind of event described. The explosion blew off both the inner and outer tube doors, ignited a fire, destroyed the bulkhead between the first and second compartments, damaged the control room in the second compartment, and incapacitated or killed the torpedo room and control-room crew. Two minutes and fifteen seconds after the first explosion, another five to seven torpedo warheads exploded. They tore a large hole in the hull, collapsed the bulkheads between the first three compartments and all the decks, destroyed compartment four, and killed everyone still alive forward of the sixth compartment. The nuclear reactors shut down without melting down. Analysts concluded that 23 sailors took refuge in the small ninth compartment and survived for more than six hours. When oxygen ran low, they attempted to replace a potassium superoxide chemical oxygen cartridge, but it fell into the oily seawater and exploded on contact. The resulting fire killed several crew members and triggered a flash fire that consumed the remaining oxygen, asphyxiating the remaining survivors.

The Dutch company Mammoet was awarded a salvage contract in May 2001. Within a three-month period, the company and its subcontractors designed, fabricated, installed, and commissioned over 3,000 t (3,000 long tons; 3,300 short tons) of custom-made equipment. A barge was modified and loaded with the equipment, arriving in the Barents Sea in August. On 3 October 2001, some 14 months after the accident, the hull was raised from the seabed floor and hauled to a dry dock. The salvage team recovered all but the bow, including the remains of 115 sailors, who were later buried in Russia. The government of Russia and the Russian Navy were intensely criticised over the incident and their responses. A four-page summary of a 133-volume investigation stated "stunning breaches of discipline, shoddy, obsolete and poorly maintained equipment", and "negligence, incompetence, and mismanagement". It stated that the rescue operation was unjustifiably delayed and that the Russian Navy was completely unprepared to respond to the disaster.

== Naval exercise ==
On the morning of 12 August 2000, Kursk was in the Barents Sea, participating in the "Summer-X" exercise, the first large-scale naval exercise undertaken by the Russian Navy in more than a decade, and also its first since the dissolution of the Soviet Union. According to the Russian press, the exercise involved more than 50 ships and submarines, 40 support vessels, and around 80 aircraft.

Kursk had recently won a citation for its excellent performance and been recognised as having the best submarine crew in the Northern Fleet. Although this was an exercise, Kursk loaded a full complement of conventional combat weapons. It was one of the few submarines authorised to carry a combat load at all times. The Oscar II Class submarines are equipped with 24 P-700 Granit (SS-N-19 "Shipwreck") cruise missiles. In addition, since the torpedo tubes can fire both torpedoes and anti-ship missiles, it also carried two dozen other weapons, including the RPK-6 Vodopad/RPK-7 Veter (SS-N-16 "Stallion") missiles.

Kursk had an almost mythical standing. It was reputedly unsinkable and, it was claimed, could withstand a direct hit from a torpedo. The outer hull was constructed using 8 mm (0.3 in) steel plate covered by up to 80 mm (3 in) of rubber, which minimised other submarines' or surface vessels' ability to detect the submarine. The inner pressure hull was made of high-quality 50 mm (2 in) steel plate. The two hulls were separated by a 1-to-2 m (3-to-7 ft) gap. The inner hull was divided into nine water-tight compartments. The boat was 155 m (509 ft), about as long as two jumbo jets.

At 08:51 local time, Kursk requested permission to conduct a torpedo training launch and received the response "Dobro" ("Good"). After considerable delay, the submarine was set to fire two dummy torpedoes at the Kirov-class battlecruiser Pyotr Velikiy. At 11:29 local time, the torpedo room crew loaded the first practice Type 65 "Kit" torpedo, (Russian: tolstushka, or "fat girl", because of its size), without a warhead, into Kursk's number-4 torpedo tube on the starboard side. It was 10.7 m (35 ft) long and weighed 5 t (4.9 long tons; 5.5 short tons).

=== Initial seismic event detected ===
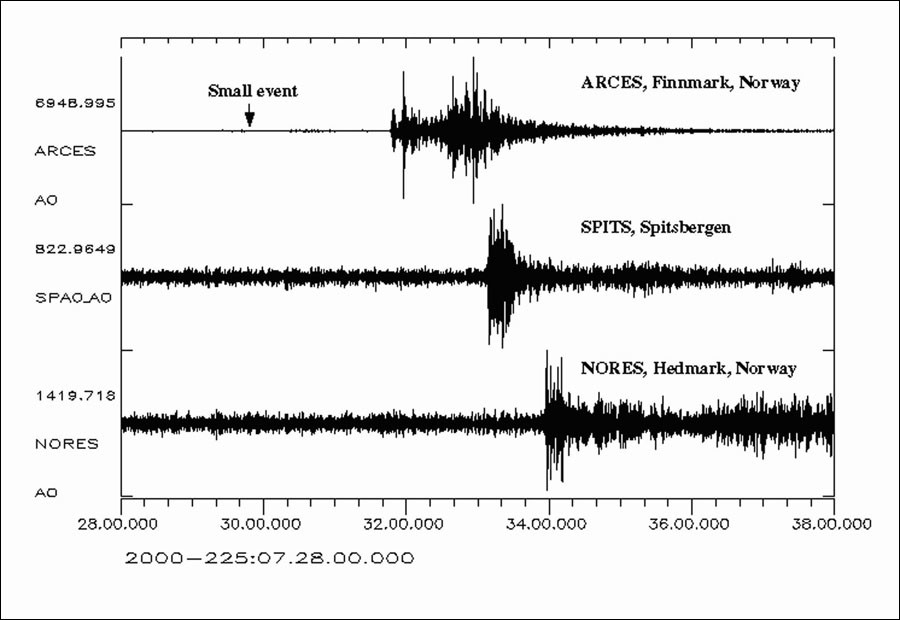
Norwegian Seismic Array seismic readings at three locations of the explosions on the submarine Kursk on 12 August 2000.

At 11:29:34 (07:29:34 GMT), seismic detectors at the Norwegian seismic array (NORSAR) and in other locations around the world recorded a seismic event of magnitude 1.5 on the Richter scale. The location was fixed at coordinates 69°38′N 37°19′E, north-east of Murmansk, approximately 250 km (160 mi) from Norway, and 80 km (50 mi) from the Kola Peninsula.

=== Secondary event ===
At 11:31:48, 2 minutes and 14 seconds after the first, a second event, measuring 4.2 on the Richter scale, or 250 times larger than the first, was registered on seismographs across northern Europe and was detected as far away as Alaska. The second explosion was equivalent to 2–3 tons of TNT.

The seismic data showed that the explosion occurred at the same depth as the sea bed. The seismic event, triangulated at 69°36.99′N 37°34.50′E, showed that in a little over 2 minutes the boat had moved about 400 m (1,300 ft) from the site of the initial explosion. It was enough time for the submarine to sink to a depth of 108 m (354 ft) and remain on the sea floor for a short period.

== Rescue response ==
The crew of the submarine Karelia detected the explosion, but the captain assumed that it was part of the exercise. Aboard Pyotr Velikiy, the target of the practice launch, the crew detected a hydroacoustic signal characteristic of an underwater explosion and felt their hull shudder. They reported the phenomenon to fleet headquarters but their report was ignored.

The schedule for Kursk to complete the practice torpedo firing expired at 13:30 without any contact from the sub. Accustomed to the frequent failure of communications equipment, Fleet Commander Admiral Vyacheslav Alekseyevich Popov, aboard Pyotr Velikiy, was not initially alarmed. The ship dispatched a helicopter to look for Kursk, but it did not find the sub on the surface; this was reported to Popov.

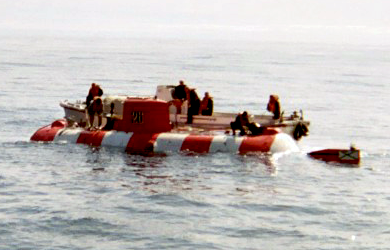
Russian sailors on the surface aboard the DSRV AS-28 Priz

The Northern Fleet duty officer notified the head of the fleet's search and rescue forces, Captain Alexander Teslenko, to stand by for orders. The primary rescue ship under Teslenko's command was a 20-year-old former lumber carrier, Mikhail Rudnitsky, which had been converted to support submersible rescue operations. Teslenko notified the ship's captain to be ready to depart on one hour's notice. Berthed at the primary Northern Fleet base at Severomorsk, the ship was equipped with two AS-34 and AS-32 Priz-class deep-submergence rescue vehicles, a diving bell, underwater video cameras, lifting cranes, and other specialised gear, but it was not equipped with stabilisers that could keep the vessel in position during stormy weather, so it could lower its rescue vessels only in calm seas. The Russian Navy had previously operated two India-class submarines, each of which carried a pair of Poseidon-class DSRVs that could reach a depth of 693 m (2,270 ft), but due to a lack of funds, the vessels had been held since 1994 in a Saint Petersburg yard for pending repairs.

At 17:00, an Ilyushin Il-38 aircraft was dispatched. The crew spent three hours searching for Kursk, without success. At 18:00, more than six hours after the initial explosion, Kursk failed to complete a scheduled communication check. The Northern Fleet command became concerned and tried to contact the boat. After repeated failures, at 18:30, they began a search-and-rescue operation, dispatching additional aircraft to locate the submarine, which again failed to locate the boat on the surface. At 22:30, the Northern Fleet declared an emergency, and the exercise was stopped. Between 15 and 22 vessels of the Northern Fleet, including about 3,000 sailors, began searching for the submarine. The Mikhail Rudnitsky left port at 00:30.

=== Official government response ===
The Russian Navy initially downplayed the incident. Late on Saturday night, nine hours after the boat sank, Northern Fleet commander Admiral Popov ordered the first search for the submarine. Twelve hours after it sank, Popov informed the Kremlin, but Minister of Defence Igor Sergeyev did not notify Putin until 07:00 Sunday morning. Sergeyev "did not recommend" that Putin visit the disaster site.

On Sunday, after Popov already knew that Kursk was missing and presumed sunk, he briefed reporters on the progress of the naval exercise. He said the exercise had been a resounding success and spoke highly of the entire operation.

=== Rumours among family members ===
Early on Sunday morning, 13 August, at the Vidyaevo Naval Base, rumours began to circulate among family members of Kursk's crew that something was wrong. A telephone operator handled an unusual volume of calls and overheard that a submarine was in trouble and the boat's name. As the base was very small, news spread quickly. Wives and family members exchanged news, but information was scarce. The deputy base commander assured the women that the headquarters office was half empty and that the officers present were just "passing the time."

=== Foreign assistance refused ===
On the afternoon of the explosion, before the Kremlin had been informed of the submarine's sinking, U.S. National Security Adviser Sandy Berger and Defense Secretary William Cohen were told that Kursk had sunk. Once officially informed, the British government, along with France, Germany, Israel, Italy, and Norway, offered help, and the United States offered the use of one of its two DSRVs, but the Russian government refused all foreign assistance. Minister of Defence Igor Sergeyev told the American Embassy that the rescue was well under way. The Russian Navy told reporters that a rescue was imminent.

=== Russian rescue efforts falter ===
At 04:50 on Sunday, 13 August, personnel aboard Pyotr Velikiy detected two anomalies on the seabed that might be the boat. At 09:00, Mikhail Rudnitsky arrived at the location. While setting anchor, its crew interpreted an acoustic sound as an SOS from the submarine, but soon concluded the noise had been produced by the anchor chain striking the anchor hole. At 11:30, Mikhail Rudnitsky prepared to lower the AS-34, which entered the water at 17:30. At 18:30, at a depth of 100 m (300 ft) and at a speed of 2 kn (3.7 km/h), the AS-34 reported colliding with an object, and through a porthole, the crew saw the Kursk's propeller and stern stabiliser. With the AS-34 damaged by the collision and forced to surface, the crew of Mikhail Rudnitsky began preparing the AS-32 for operation.

At 22:40, the AS-32 entered the water and began searching for Kursk. It failed to locate the submarine because it had been given an incorrect heading by personnel aboard Pyotr Velikiy. Crew aboard Mikhail Rudnitsky tried to contact Kursk and briefly thought they heard an acoustic SOS signal, but this was determined to be of natural origin. They reported the sounds to Pyotr Velikiy. The AS-32 returned to the surface at 01:00 on Monday morning, 14 August.

The salvage tug Nikolay Chiker (SB 131) arrived early in the rescue operation. Using deep-water camera equipment, it obtained the first images of the wrecked submarine, which showed severe damage from the sub's bow to its sail. Kursk was listing at a 25-degree angle and down 5–7 degrees by the bow. The bow had ploughed about 22 m (72 ft) deep into the clay seabed, at a depth of 108 m (354 ft). The periscope was raised, indicating that the accident occurred when the submarine was at a depth of less than 20 m (66 ft).

The AS-34 was repaired and was launched at 05:00 on Monday. At 06:50, the AS-34 located Kursk and tried but failed to attach to the aft escape trunk over Kursk's ninth compartment. Unable to create the vacuum seal necessary to attach to the escape trunk, its batteries were quickly depleted and the crew was forced to surface. No spare batteries were available, so the crew was forced to wait while the batteries were recharged. Meanwhile, winds increased, blowing 10–12 m/s (19–23 kn) to 15–27 m/s (29–52 kn), and the waves rose to 3–4 points (4–8 ft; 1.2–2.4 m), forcing the Russians to suspend rescue operations.

=== First official announcement ===
The first official announcement of the accident was made by the Russian government on Monday, 14 August. They told the media that Kursk had had "minor technical difficulties" on Sunday. They stated that the submarine had "descended to the ocean floor", that they had established contact with the crew and were pumping air and power to the boat, and that "everyone on board is alive." The BBC reported that the Kursk crew "had been forced to ground" the submarine because it "[had] broken down during exercises," but rescue crews were "in radio contact with surface vessels."

=== Collision initially blamed ===
Senior officers in the Russian Navy offered a variety of explanations for the accident. Four days after Kursk sank, Russian Navy Commander-in-Chief and Fleet Admiral Vladimir Kuroyedov stated the accident had been caused by a serious collision. Vice-premier Ilya Klebanov said the submarine might have hit an old World War II mine. He also said that almost all of the sailors had died before the vessel hit bottom.

The Russian government convened a commission, chaired by Vice-Premier Ilya Klebanov, on 14 August, two days after Kursk sank. Nearly half of the commission members were officials with a stake in the outcome of the investigation. Independent investigators were not invited to take part, giving the appearance that the commission's findings might not be impartial.

=== Weather delays efforts ===
Bad weather, 3.7 m (12 ft) waves, strong undersea currents, and limited visibility impaired the rescue crews' ability to conduct operations on Tuesday and Wednesday. On Tuesday Mikhail Rudnitsky lowered a diving bell twice, but could not connect to the sub. They also tried and failed to manoeuvre a remotely operated vehicle onto the rescue hatch.

At 20:00 Tuesday, AS-34 was launched again, but was damaged when it struck a boom as it was being lowered into the sea. It was brought back aboard, repaired, and relaunched at 21:10. On Tuesday, 15 August, three days after the sinking, the crane ship PK-7500 arrived with the more manoeuvrable Project 18270 Bester-type DSRV (AC-36). The weather, though, prevented the PK-7500 from launching the DSRV. The rescue team decided to launch the submersible near the coast and tow it to the rescue site with a salvage tug.

On Wednesday, 16 August, at 00:20, AS-34 twice attempted to attach to the ninth compartment escape hatch, but failed. It surfaced, and as it was being lifted onto the deck of the mother ship, its propulsion system was seriously damaged. The crew of Mikhail Rudnitsky cannibalised the AS-32 to repair the AS-34. Rescue operations were suspended while the repairs were made. PK-7500 arrived from the coast where it had launched its DSRV. It repeatedly lowered the rescue vessel 110 m (360 ft) to the submarine but it could not latch onto an escape hatch. One of the rescue capsules was damaged by the storm.

On Thursday at 12:00, Popov reported to the general staff of the Navy that no explosion had occurred on the Kursk, that the sub was intact on the seafloor, and that an "external influence" might have caused a leak between the first and second compartments. On Thursday, the Russian DSRV made another attempt to reach the aft area of the submarine, but it could not create the vacuum seal necessary to attach to the escape trunk. The Russians' 32-hour response time was widely criticised.

The rescue ship Altay attempted to attach a Kolokol diving bell to the sub, but failed. Russian Navy headquarters in Moscow told media that rescuers had heard tapping from within the boat's hull, spelling "SOS ... water", although the possibility of hearing tapping through the double hull was later discounted. Other reports said the sounds had been misinterpreted or were made up.

Rescue divers did not reportedly attempt to tap on the hull to signal potential survivors acoustically. However, video evidence seems to suggest otherwise, as it shows Norwegian divers tapping on the aft rescue hatch while the rescue part of the operation was still underway.

Fragments of both the outer and inner hulls were found nearby, including a piece of Kursk's nose weighing 5 t (5.5 short tons), indicating a large explosion in the forward torpedo room.

=== British and Norwegian help ===
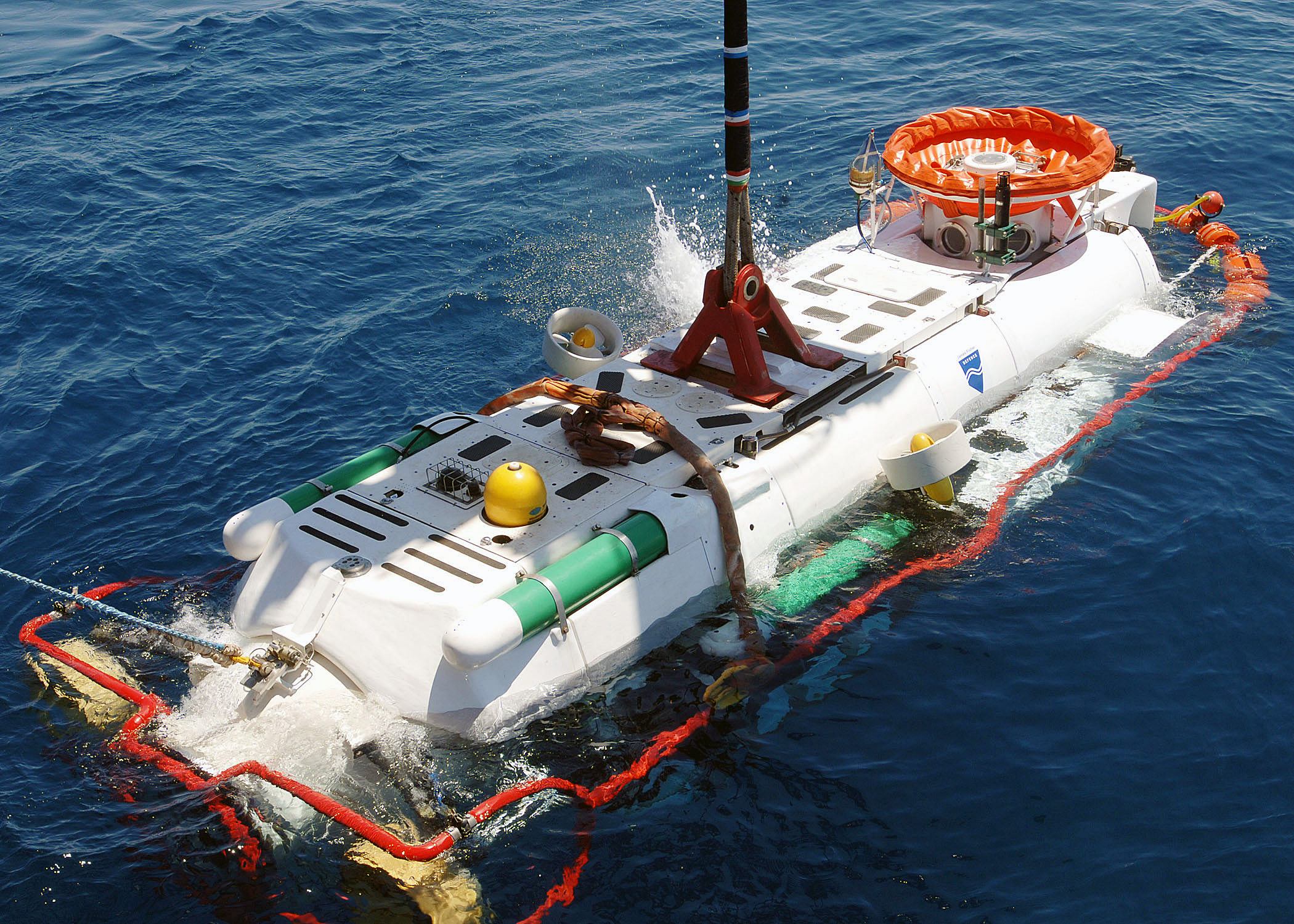
The British deep submersible rescue vehicle LR5

Private media and state-owned Russian newspapers criticised the Navy's refusal to accept international assistance. Five days after the accident on 17 August 2000, President Putin accepted the British and Norwegian governments' offer of assistance. Six teams of British and Norwegian divers arrived on Friday, 18 August. The Russian 328th Expeditionary rescue squad, part of the Navy's Office of Search and Rescue, also provided divers. On 19 August at 20:00, the Norwegian ship Normand Pioneer arrived with the British rescue submersible LR5 on board, seven days after the disaster.

On Sunday 20 August, the Norwegians lowered a remotely operated vehicle (ROV) to the submarine. They found that the first 18 m (59 ft) section of the boat was a mass of twisted metal and debris.

Russian Navy officials imposed specific constraints that restricted the Norwegian divers to work on the stern of the boat, specifically the escape hatch over compartment nine and an air-control valve connected to the rescue trunk. The Norwegian deep-sea divers protested against the restrictions, which they believed impeded their rescue operations.

When the divers attempted to open the air-control valve, it would not move. Russian experts told the divers that they must open the valve anticlockwise, or they would break it. The divers finally went against the experts' advice and tried turning it clockwise, which worked.

The divers tried to use the arms of the ROV to open the hatch, but were unsuccessful until the morning of Monday, 21 August. They found the rescue trunk full of water. That morning, they used a custom tool to open the internal hatch of the rescue trunk, releasing a large volume of air from the ninth compartment. Divers lowered a video camera on a rod into the compartment and saw several bodies.

The salvage companies agreed that the Norwegian divers would cut the holes in the hull, but only Russian divers would enter the submarine. The Norwegian divers cut a hole in the hull of the eighth compartment to gain access, using a cutting machine that shoots a high-velocity water-and-cutting-grit mix at a pressure of 100,000 kPa (15,000 psi). The Russian divers entered the wreck and opened a bulkhead hatch to compartment nine.

They found that dust and ash inside compartment nine severely restricted visibility. As they gradually worked their way inside the compartment and down two levels, Warrant Officer Sergei Shmygin found the remains of Captain-lieutenant Dmitry Kolesnikov. All the men had been badly burned. The divers cut additional holes in the hull over the third and fourth compartments. The Russian divers removed secret documents and eventually recovered a total of 12 bodies from the ninth compartment. This contradicted earlier statements made by senior Russian officials that all the submariners had died before the submarine hit the bottom. They also found the ship's log, but had to suspend work because of severe weather. The rescue teams conducted continuous radiation measurements inside and outside the submarine, but none of the readings exceeded normal ranges.

On 21 August, after the Norwegian divers confirmed that no one was alive in the ninth compartment, Russian Northern Fleet Chief of Staff Mikhail Motsak announced to the public that the Kursk was flooded and that all of its crewmembers had died. Admiral Popov, commander of the Northern Fleet, also addressed the public in a televised broadcast (at the end of which he removed his navy beret) and asked the Kursk family members for forgiveness: "...forgive me for not bringing back your boys."

Additional plans were made to continue to remove the bodies, but the Russian Navy could not agree on a contract with a foreign company. The families of those who died on the submarine protested that they did not want additional lives put at risk to bring up the dead. On 22 August, President Putin issued an executive order declaring 23 August a day of mourning. On 26 August, Putin awarded the title of the Hero of Russia posthumously to the submarine's commander, Gennady Lyachin, and the 117 crewmembers and specialists were posthumously awarded the Order of Courage.

=== Russian claim of collision with NATO submarine ===
On Monday 14 August, Fleet Admiral Vladimir Kuroyedov stated the accident had been caused by a serious collision with a NATO submarine, but provided no evidence. Senior commanders of the Russian Navy repeated this claim for more than two years after the disaster. This explanation was popular among those who wished for continued poor relations between Russia and the West.

During the original exercise, the Russian Navy required each submarine stay within a specified area. This protocol was intended to eliminate the possibility of a collision and allow surface ships to detect the presence of a Western spy sub.

On 29 or 30 August 2000, an official government commission tasked with investigating the disaster announced that the sinking was likely caused by a "strong 'dynamic external impact' corresponding with the 'first event'", probably a collision with a WWII mine, a foreign submarine, or a large surface vessel. The commission claimed the exercise had been monitored by two American Los Angeles-class submarines—USS Memphis and Toledo—as well as the Royal Navy Swiftsure-class submarine HMS Splendid. Russian sources said that when the exercise was cancelled due to the accident, these vessels put in at European ports.

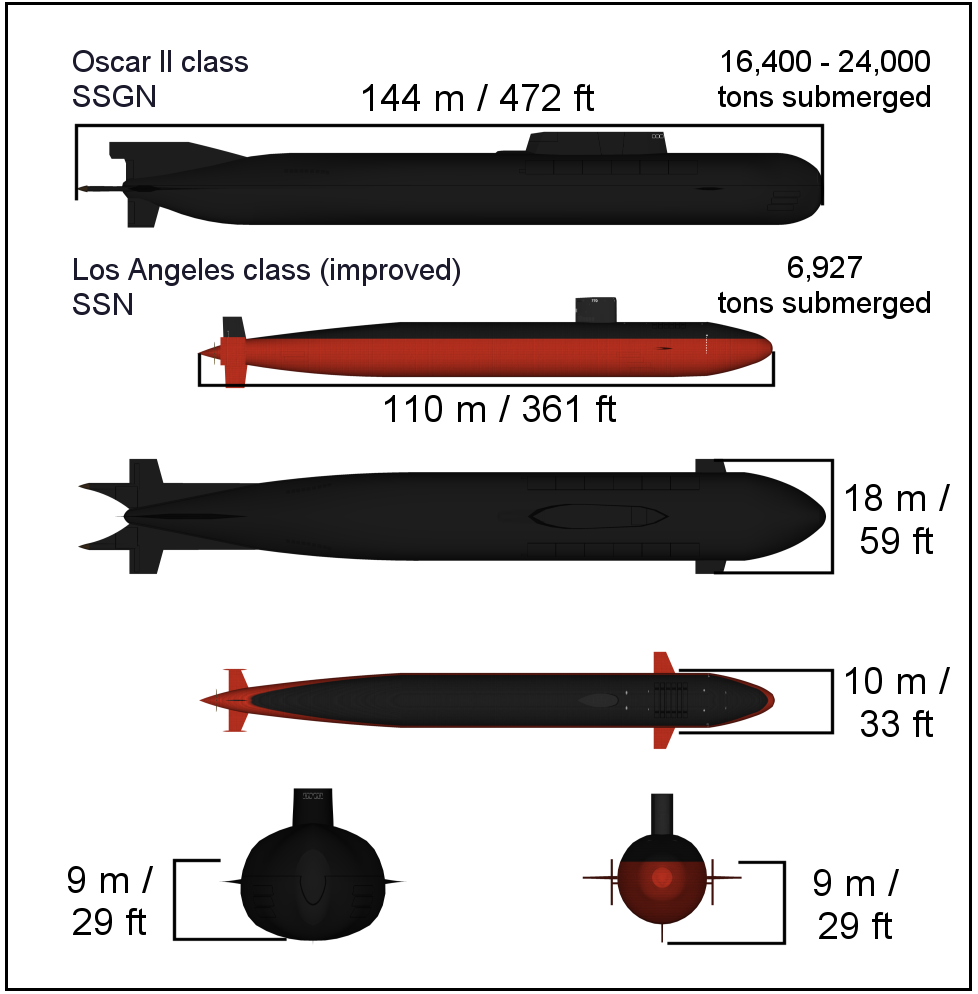
Size and mass comparison of Kursk and USS Toledo, which has less than half of Kursk's displacement

United States Secretary of Defense William S. Cohen responded to Russian accusations of a collision with a submarine at a press conference in Tokyo on 22 September 2000.

Q: Russians are suggesting that one of the possible reasons is a collision with a NATO or American submarine, they are asking to let them, well, have a look at a couple of United States submarines and the answer from the American side is no; so I ask, why not? And what is your own explanation of that particular accident. Thank you. – Reporter

A: With respect to the Kursk, we had made it very clear that the United States, that our ships had no role in that terrible tragedy. We have communicated that, we believe that our word, indeed, has been categorical. I have received every assurance and I know that all our ships are operational and could not possibly have been involved in any kind of contact with the Russian submarine. So frankly, there is no need for inspections, since ours are completely operational, there was no contact whatsoever with the Kursk. I hope that the Russian authorities find out the cause of it. All I can do is speculate at this point, that there were internal blasts that led to the loss of that ship and the fine men aboard her.

While the official inquiry was underway, on 25 October 2000, Commander of the Northern Fleet Popov and his Chief of Staff Motsak were interviewed by the Spanish newspaper El Mundo. They repeated the theory that Kursk collided with a NATO submarine shadowing the exercise. Fleet Admiral Vladimir Kuroyedov stated again on 25 October that he was 80% certain the accident was caused by a collision with a foreign submarine. Eleven collisions had occurred between submarines in the Barents Sea since 1967. The Russian Navy produced video footage of the wreck, claiming it proved a collision occurred.

On 5 November, a representative of the Northern Fleet general staff told the Russian NTV television station that the sinking was caused by a collision. Admiral Mikhail Motsak repeated this assertion on 17 November in an interview with the Russian newspaper Izvestia. Officials insisted that an American submarine was at fault for shadowing Kursk too closely. The Russian Navy produced satellite imagery of the U.S. submarine Memphis docked at a Norwegian naval base in Bergen just after the alleged collision, alleging Memphis had surfaced for repairs, but the authenticity of the photos was never proven.

Geophysicists who analysed the seismic signals concluded and reported in February 2001 that the initial sound recorded was triggered by an explosion, not a collision. The seismic waveforms of the second event, known by then to be from the explosion of several torpedo warheads, also generated a high-frequency bubble signature characteristic of an underwater explosion of about 3–7 tons of TNT. When analysts compared the second event with the first, they concluded that the first event was also a torpedo explosion. Britain's Blacknest seismic monitoring station, which studies seismic signals generated by underground nuclear explosions and earthquakes, identified two distinct explosions. It determined that the two shockwaves perfectly matched and were consistent with torpedo explosions.

=== Criticism of government response ===
While rescue crews repeatedly failed to attach to the rescue trunk or contact potential survivors aboard the submarine, President Putin appeared on TV, enjoying a summer holiday at a Black Sea villa. His apparent indifference outraged many Russians, including the families of Kursk's crew. Amelia Gentleman wrote in The Guardian:

For President Vladimir Putin, the Kursk crisis was not merely a human tragedy, it was a personal PR catastrophe. Twenty-four hours after the submarine's disappearance, as Russian naval officials made bleak calculations about the chances of the 118 men on board, Putin was filmed enjoying himself, shirtsleeves rolled up, hosting a barbecue at his holiday villa on the Black Sea.

Russian media strongly criticised the government's response to and handling of the sinking. Images of angry family members demanding information or waiting anxiously at the dock for news were shown on media worldwide. Some relatives said they learned of the disaster only from the public media or from conflicting rumours circulating at the navy base. They complained they did not receive any information from the government on the status of the disaster or rescue efforts until Wednesday, five days after the sinking. Some could not determine whether their family members were aboard the sunken vessel. The government refused to release a list of the missing sailors even to the families of those aboard; a Pravda reporter paid an officer 18,000 ₽ to get the list. Even then, the government tried to prohibit reporters from contacting family members.

The continued problems that the rescuers had in reaching potential survivors and ongoing conflicting information about the cause of the accident inflamed Russian public opinion. Media described the Russian government's response to the disaster as "technically inept" and their stories as "totally unreliable".

=== Putin meets with families ===
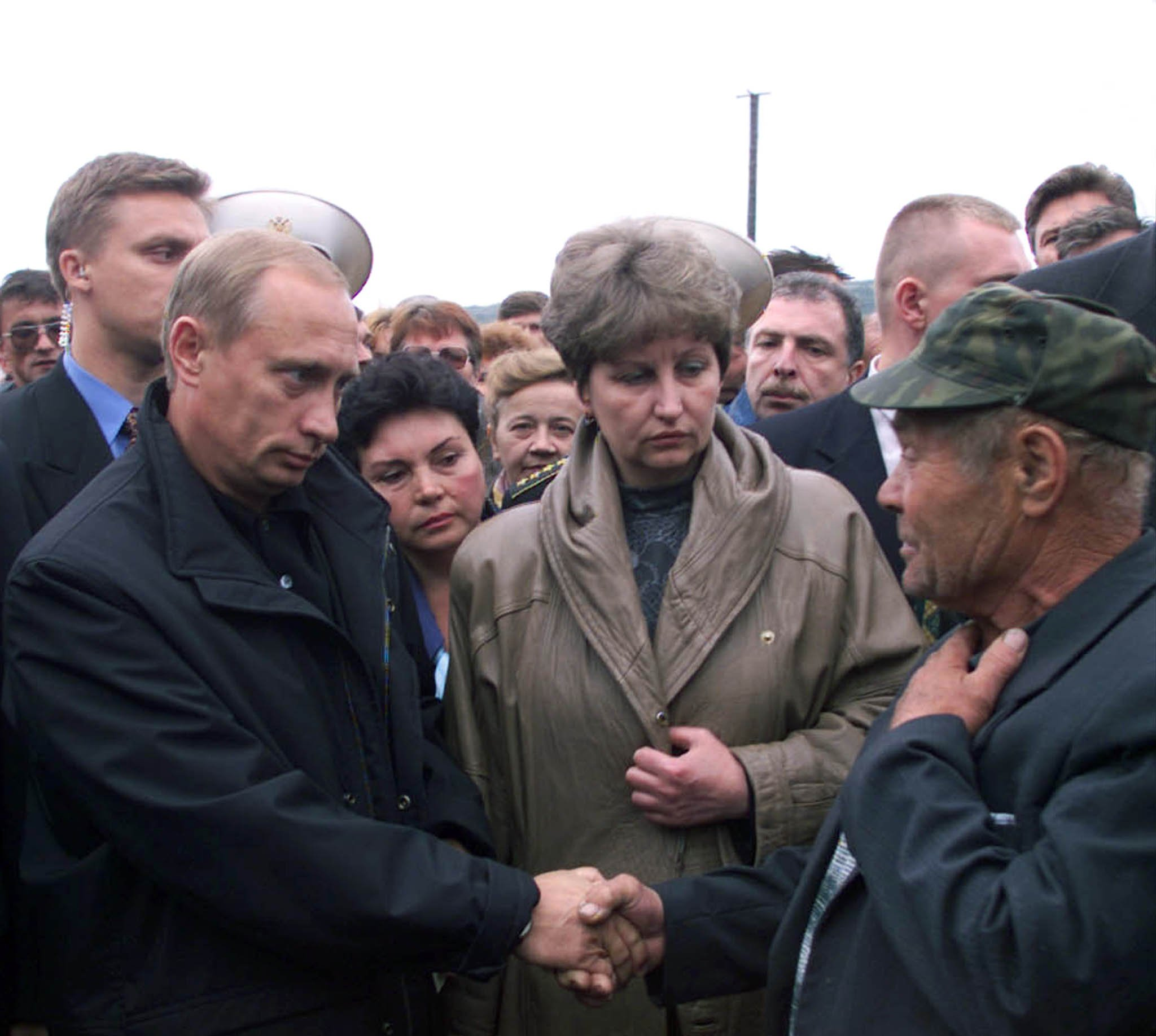
President Putin in a contentious meeting with relatives of the dead sailors in Vidyayevo, during which the families complained about the Russian Navy's response to the disaster

President Putin had been advised by the military from the start of the disaster that they had the situation under control and that he did not need to intervene. He was told that a strong possibility existed that a foreign vessel had caused the accident and that Russia should not accept help from foreign powers. Only four months into his tenure as president, Putin was highly criticised by the public and media for his decision to remain at a seaside resort, and his once highly favourable ratings dropped dramatically. The President's response appeared callous and the government's actions looked incompetent.

On Tuesday, 22 August, 10 days after the sinking, Putin met at the Vidyayevo naval base officers' club and cultural centre with about 400 to 600 angry and grieving residents of the base and about 350 family members of the Kursk's crew. The meeting was closed and access was tightly controlled. Two Russian journalists from Nezavisimaya Gazeta and Kommersant posing as family members witnessed distraught widows and mothers howling at Putin, demanding to know why they were receiving so much conflicting information and who was going to be punished for the deaths of their family members. They cried:

- Do you believe our men are still alive?
- Why have you murdered our lads?
- When would the bodies of the submariners be brought home?
- When will we get them back, dead or alive?
- Who are you going to punish for their deaths, and how?

The hostile, contentious meeting lasted for three to six hours.

German television channel RTL provided the Russian national daily newspaper Kommersant with an unedited transcript. The transcript revealed that Putin told the families that Admiral of the Fleet Vladimir Kuroyedov had agreed to accept foreign assistance as soon as it was offered on Wednesday, 16 August, but was shouted down as soon as he offered this explanation. The family members knew from media reports that foreign assistance had been offered on Monday. Up to this point, family members had received 1,000 ₽ (about US$37 in 2000) in compensation. Putin also offered the families additional compensation equivalent to ten years' salary, about US$7,000 at the time.

==== Mother forcibly sedated ====
The Russian state channel RTR was the only news station granted access. Its severely edited broadcast of the meeting showed only Putin speaking, eliminating the many emotional and contentious encounters between the family members and the President. Its single TV camera fed a signal to a satellite truck on loan to RTR from the German television company RTL, and RTL recorded the entire event.

Nadezhda Tylik, mother of Kursk submariner Lt. Sergei Tylik, was extremely emotional and interrupted the meeting. She harangued Putin and Deputy Prime Minister Klebanov, accusing them of lying to the families. She told them, "You better shoot yourselves now! We won't let you live, bastards!" When she would not be quiet, a nurse in civilian apparel behind her forcibly injected her through her clothing with a sedative. Tylik quickly lost the ability to speak and was carried out. Immediately after the injection, Tylik's husband said he had requested the nurse administer the drug "because she was prone to excessive emotions."

The whole scene was captured by the TV crew but was not televised within Russia. Foreign media, however, showed Tylik's forcible removal by officials. Tylik later criticised President Putin for refusing to "answer direct questions" at the meeting. "Maybe he did not know what to say, but we did not receive concrete answers to concrete questions," she said. Tylik told The St. Petersburg Times that she would go to any lengths to learn the truth about the submarine disaster: "They told us lies the whole time, and even now we are unable to get any information".

Russians and observers in the West were shocked by the incident and feared that the public sedation of Tylik meant that the former Soviet Union was returning to Cold War-era methods of silencing dissent. Tylik said that her son had told her six days before the disaster that the submarine had "'death onboard', but he did not explain what he meant." She said, "I am sure that the commanders of the Northern Fleet knew that the torpedoes were not in order. Those who are guilty must be punished." Navy officials in Vidyayevo later confirmed to The Times and to The St. Petersburg Times that Tylik was given a sedative. "We've been giving sedatives to relatives since this began, and it is not such a big deal as you make it out to be in the West," said an officer who would not identify himself. "We are simply protecting the relatives from undue pain – it was for her own protection."

Journalist Andrey Kolesnikov, who had been present at Putin's meeting with the families, described his experience in a 2015 documentary titled President. He said that when he watched Putin speak to them, "I honestly thought they would tear him apart. There was such a heavy atmosphere there, such a clot of hatred, and despair, and pain. I never felt anything like it anywhere in my entire life. All the questions were aimed at this single man."

=== Putin blames media ===
In response to the avalanche of criticism, Minister of Defence Sergeyev and senior commanders of the Navy and the Northern Fleet offered Putin their resignations, but he refused to accept them.

Putin lashed back at the press, which had been severely critical of his personal response and the entire government's handling of a national tragedy. During the meeting with the crew's relatives, he loudly blamed the oligarchs, who owned most of the country's non-government media, for the poor state of Russia's military. Putin told the family members, "There are people in television today who ... over the last 10 years destroyed the very army and fleet where people are dying now ... They stole money, they bought the media, and they're manipulating public opinion." When relatives asked why the government had waited so long before accepting foreign assistance, Putin said the media had lied. He shouted to the assembled families, "They're lying. They're lying. They're lying." Putin threatened to punish the media owners and counter their influence through alternative "honest and objective" media. He scornfully derided their ownership of property abroad. "They'd better sell their villas on the Mediterranean coast of France or Spain. Then they might have to explain why all this property is registered in false names under front law-firms. Perhaps we would ask them where they got the money."

In a speech to the Russian people the day after his meeting with the families, Putin continued his furious attack on the Russian media, accusing them of lying and discrediting the country. He said they were trying to "exploit this misfortune ... to gain political capital."

=== Family compensation announced ===
On the same day as Putin's broadcast, Deputy Prime Minister Valentina Matviyenko, head of a special commission, announced that the families of the Kursk sailors would receive not only 10 years' salary, but also free housing in the Russian city of their choice, free college education for their children, and free counselling. With the addition of other donations received from across the world, the families received about US$35,000 in payments. Captain Igor Kurten, head of the St. Petersburg Submariners Club, said it was the first time victims of a tragedy were given adequate compensation by the Russian government.

== Official inquiry results ==
On 26 July 2002, almost two years later, the government commission and Russian Prosecutor General Vladimir Ustinov announced that the hydrogen peroxide fuel in the dummy torpedo inside the fourth torpedo launcher caused the initial explosion which sank Kursk.

=== Secret report ===
Ustinov released a 133-volume top-secret report in August 2002, two years after the disaster. The government published a four-page summary in Rossiyskaya Gazeta that revealed "stunning breaches of discipline, shoddy, obsolete and poorly maintained equipment", and "negligence, incompetence, and mismanagement". The report said the rescue operation was unjustifiably delayed.

=== Initial blast damage ===
The bulkhead between the first and second compartments was traversed by a circular 47 cm (19 in) air conditioning duct. The bulkhead should have arrested the blast wave, but in keeping with common Russian submarine practice, the pressurised valve in the ventilation system that traversed the bulkhead was left open to minimise the change in pressure during a weapon's launch. The initial blast set off a fire that was later estimated to have burned at 2,700 °C (4,890 °F). The government report concluded that the initial explosion and fire in the torpedo room compartment immediately killed all seven crew members within.

The open valve in the ventilation system allowed the huge blast wave and possibly fire and toxic smoke to enter the second and perhaps the third and fourth compartments. Although the sub was at periscope depth with its radio antennas extended, no one in the command post sent a distress signal or pressed a single button that would initiate an emergency ballast-tank blow and bring the submarine to the surface. All 36 men in the command post located in the second compartment were immediately incapacitated by the blast wave and likely killed.

=== Secondary explosion ===
Two minutes and 14 seconds after the first explosion in the torpedo compartment, the fire caused a second explosion by detonating five to seven combat-ready torpedo warheads. Acoustic data from Pyotr Velikiy were later analysed and found to indicate the explosion of about seven torpedo warheads in rapid succession. The Type 65 "Kit" torpedo carries a large 450 kg (990 lb) warhead.

While the sub was submerged, 78 crew were normally assigned to the first four compartments and 49 to the rear five compartments. Although Kursk was designed to withstand external pressure of depths down to 1,000 m (3,300 ft), the second explosion tore a 2 m^{2} (22 sq ft) hole in the hull, opening the first through fourth compartments to the sea. Water poured in at 90,000 L (3,200 cu ft) per second. The second explosion collapsed the first three compartments and all of the decks. In addition to the crew in those compartments, five officers from 7th SSGN Division Headquarters and two design engineers were on board to observe the performance of a new battery in the USET-80 torpedo, set to be launched second. Anyone who remained alive in those compartments was killed by the second explosion.

=== Practice torpedo blamed ===
The government report confirmed that Kursk had been sunk by a torpedo explosion caused when high-test peroxide (HTP), a form of highly concentrated hydrogen peroxide, leaked from cracks in the torpedo's casing. The fuel in the torpedoes carried by Kursk was inexpensive and very powerful. Ordinarily, the oxygen combines with kerosene fuel in the torpedo engine to propel the missile at higher speeds for longer ranges than conventional torpedoes.

HTP is normally stable until it comes in contact with a catalyst. It then expands 5,000 times in volume extremely rapidly, acting as an oxidiser, generating large volumes of steam and oxygen in a highly exothermic reaction. Torpedoes using HTP had been in use since the 1950s, but other navies stopped using them because of the danger inherent in their design. HMS Sidon sank in 1955, killing 13 sailors, when an experimental torpedo containing HTP exploded as it was being loaded.

Investigators concluded that the leaking HTP had catalytically decomposed when it came in contact with copper commonly found in the bronze and brass used to manufacture Kursk's torpedo tubes. Once HTP begins decomposing, it is impossible to stop until the fuel is exhausted. The 1,000 kg (2,200 lb) of concentrated HTP ruptured the torpedo's 500 kg (1,100 lb) kerosene fuel tank and caused an explosion equal to 100–250 kg (220–550 lb) of TNT that registered 2.2 on the Richter scale on detectors hundreds of kilometres away.

Salvage crews located a piece of the number-four torpedo cover on the seabed 50 m (160 ft) behind the main wreckage. Its position, distance, and direction relative to the rest of the submarine indicated that it was deposited there as a result of the first explosion in that tube.

According to an article that briefly appeared on Thursday 17 August 2000 on the website of the official newspaper of the Russian Defence Ministry, Krasnaya Zvezda, Kursk had been refitted in 1998—four years after it was commissioned—to carry torpedoes fueled using the cheap HTP. The article reported that some specialists in the Russian Navy opposed use of the HTP-fueled torpedoes because they were volatile and dangerous. The story did not appear in the print edition on Friday 18 August. Instead, the article was replaced with another that speculated the submarine had collided with an "unidentified object". The change was likely due to political pressure. Vice-Premier Ilya Klebanov, chairman of the government commission investigating the disaster, had a vested interest in blaming the disaster on a collision with a NATO vessel. As head of the defence industries he had promoted use of the HTP torpedoes over safer, more-expensive silver-zinc battery-powered torpedoes in spite of objections from naval officers.

=== Faulty weld identified ===
The government's final report found that the officers who had issued the order approving use of the HTP torpedoes did not have the authority to issue that order. The dummy torpedo was 10 years old and some of its parts had exceeded their service lives. Several sources said that one of the practice torpedoes had been dropped during transport, possibly leading to a crack in the casing, but that the weapon was put aboard the submarine anyway. The crane that would normally have been used to load the missiles was out of order, and another had to be brought in, delaying the loading process. This also made the possibility of removing a damaged torpedo more difficult.

Personnel who had loaded the practice torpedoes the day before the exercise noticed the rubber seals were leaking fuel and notified junior officers of the issue, who took no action because of the exercise's importance to the Russian Navy. Though the leaks on the dummy torpedoes had been detected, the rubber seals were not inspected before the exercise. The crew was also supposed to follow a very strict procedure while preparing the practice HTP torpedo for firing.

Maintenance records revealed that the 65-76 "Kit" practice torpedo carried by Kursk came from a batch of 10 manufactured in 1990, six of which were rejected due to faulty welding. An investigation revealed that because the torpedoes were not intended to carry warheads, the welds had not been inspected as carefully as welds on torpedoes carrying warheads. When salvage crews recovered the remains of the torpedo and the launch tube, analyses found both bore signs of distortion and heat damage consistent with an explosion near the middle of the torpedo, very close to an essential welded joint. The official conclusion of the commission was that a faulty weld caused the explosion.

=== Escape capsule inaccessible ===
In case of emergency, personnel in the rear compartments were instructed to move forward to the third compartment along with those in the forward compartments and enter a detachable rescue capsule in the sail (or conning tower), which could evacuate the entire crew. Alternatively, there was also an escape trunk in the first compartment, but the explosion and fire rendered its use impossible. The rescue capsule in the third compartment was inaccessible, even if it was still usable.

=== Shutdown of nuclear reactors ===
The fifth compartment contained two OK-650 reactors. These nuclear reactors were built to withstand larger forces than other interior bulkheads. Like the exterior hull, these bulkheads were designed to withstand pressure to depths of 1,000 m (3,300 ft). The reactors were additionally encased in 13 cm (5.1 in) of steel and resiliently mounted to absorb shocks in excess of 50 g. The bulkheads of the fifth compartment withstood both explosions, allowing the two reactors to shut down automatically and prevent a nuclear meltdown and widespread contamination of the sea.

=== Automated recordings disabled ===
The fifth compartment, in addition to the reactors, contained equipment that automatically recorded the operating activity of the vessel. Twenty-two recordings were analysed by specialists from the Saint Petersburg Center of Speech Technologies. They discovered the system had been turned off the day of the disaster, in violation of procedure.

=== Rescue buoy disabled ===
Kursk was equipped with an emergency rescue buoy on top of compartment seven designed to automatically deploy upon detecting a variety of emergency conditions, including fire or a rapid pressure change. It was intended to float to the surface and send a signal, helping rescuers locate the stricken vessel. Some reports claimed the buoy, after repeatedly malfunctioning, had been welded in place. These reports were confirmed after investigators learned Kursk had been deployed to the Mediterranean during the summer of 1999 to monitor the U.S. fleet responding to the Kosovo War. Russian Navy officers, fearing that the buoy might accidentally deploy and reveal the submarine's position to the U.S. fleet, had ordered the buoy be intentionally disabled. The rescue buoy remained inoperative during the disaster.

=== No charges filed ===
Despite the many lapses in procedures and equipment, Ustinov said no charges would be filed because the disaster was caused by a technical malfunction and blame could not be placed on specific individuals. He said that all of the sailors had died within eight hours and none of them could have been rescued in the time available. At a news conference announcing the end of the official inquiry, he absolved the torpedo's manufacturer of any fault. "Those who designed the torpedo couldn't foresee the possibility of its explosion." He also said there was no evidence that the torpedo had been damaged when it was loaded onto Kursk.

When Ustinov closed the criminal case without filing charges, family members were angry. Retired Russian Navy Captain Vladimir Mityayev, who lost a son on Kursk, said "To me, this is a clear case of negligence." In the end, no one was blamed for the disaster and no one was held responsible.

== Alternative explanations ==
While the official government commission blamed the explosion on a faulty weld in the practice torpedo, Vice Admiral Valery Ryazantsev cited inadequate training, poor maintenance, and incomplete inspections that caused the crew to mishandle the weapon. The internal tube door was designed to be three times as strong as the external torpedo door, so that any explosion inside the tube would be directed out into the sea. Salvage crews found the internal tube hatch cover embedded in the bulkhead separating the first and second compartments, 12 m (39 ft) from the tube. This led investigators to conclude that the internal door likely was not fully closed when the explosion occurred.

The electrical connectors between the torpedoes and the internal tube door were known to be unreliable, often forcing torpedo crews to open and reclose the door in order to clean the connection and make good electrical contact. Kursk's crew had not fired a torpedo in three years, and that torpedo was a much simpler battery-powered type. The crew had to complete specific maintenance steps on a regular basis and before firing a torpedo. This included cleaning the torpedo tube of lubricants, metal shavings, and dust that accumulate during long periods of inactivity.

After the disaster, investigators recovered a partially burned copy of the safety instructions for loading HTP torpedoes, but the instructions were for a significantly different type of torpedo and failed to include essential steps for testing an air valve. The 7th Division, 1st Submarine Flotilla never inspected the Kursk's crew's qualifications and readiness to fire HTP torpedoes. Kursk's crew had no prior experience with and had not been trained in handling or firing HTP-powered torpedoes. Ryazantsev believed that due to their inexperience and lack of training, compounded by incomplete inspections and oversight, and because Kursk's crew followed faulty instructions when loading the practice torpedo, they set off a chain of events that led to the explosion. Ryazantsev asserted that signatures on the records documenting that the sailors had been trained in handling and firing HTP torpedoes had been faked. He stated that the warhead fuzes on combat torpedoes 1, 3, 5, and 6 were set off when the first compartment collapsed after striking the sea bottom.

=== Accusations of cover-up ===
The Komsomolskaya Pravda tabloid published a report in June 2001 that senior officers in the Russian Navy had engaged in an elaborate deception to cover the actual cause of the disaster. This referred to statements that the boat's captain, Gennady Lyachin, had sent a message to headquarters immediately prior to the explosion, "We have a malfunctioning torpedo. Request permission to fire it," though it is unlikely that, as captain of the vessel, he would have needed to request permission under such circumstances.

The Russian Navy was later criticised as misrepresenting facts and misleading the public. The navy feared that if the submarine were revealed to have blown up because of crew incompetence, Russia's status as a great power would be in doubt. Their response was compared to the Soviet style of cover-up and stonewalling like that of the Chernobyl disaster. Minister of Defence Sergeyev said in interviews on 21 August 2000 that he had never refused any foreign help.

The Guardian wrote in a 2002 review of two books, Kursk, Russia's Lost Pride and A Time to Die: The Kursk Disaster:

The hopelessly flawed rescue attempt, hampered by badly designed and decrepit equipment, illustrated the fatal decline of Russia's military power. The navy's callous approach to the families of the missing men was reminiscent of an earlier Soviet insensitivity to individual misery. The lies and incompetent cover-up attempts launched by both the navy and the government were resurrected from a pre-Glasnost era. The wildly contradictory conspiracy theories about what caused the catastrophe said more about a naval high command in turmoil, fumbling for a scapegoat, than about the accident itself.

=== Conspiracy theories ===
While most experts agreed a torpedo explosion occurred, they disagreed on the cause. Many Russians did not believe that Kursk could be so easily sunk. The tragedy spawned a number of conspiracy theories. One theory offered was an explosion located in the high-pressure air tanks used to blow the ballast tanks, located near the torpedo tubes. Mainstream publications like Der Spiegel, Berliner Zeitung, and the Sunday Times claimed to possess documentation proving the submarine was struck by a torpedo fired by Pyotr Velikiy. This was the largest naval exercise that the Russian Navy had conducted in more than a decade, which increased the probability of a friendly fire incident. Other theories included Chechen espionage, human error, sabotage, and that Kursk was testing a new top-secret torpedo, Shkval (Squall), capable of speeds in excess of 200 kn (370 km/h). Another theory was that USS Memphis had fired a torpedo at Kursk.

=== Manufacturer disagrees on cause ===
The director of the Gidropribor Research Institute that designed the torpedo, Stanislav Proshkin, challenged the conclusion of the government's official report. He argued the weapon could explode only after an external event, such as a fire. He said that routine tests during manufacture include dropping the torpedo from a height of 10 m (33 ft), suggesting drops cannot incur damage that would cause an explosion. He also said Kursk was designed with two autonomous, independent control systems that would have detected a rise in temperature while the torpedo was stored on the racks. The sub was equipped with a special drain system that could rapidly drain HTP-fuel from a torpedo into the sea. If a temperature rise were detected in the torpedo tube, the torpedo would have automatically been ejected into the sea. In addition, any fire in the torpedo compartment would have triggered a powerful fire-extinguishing system that would have dumped "tons of water" on the fire.

== Salvage operation ==
The Russian government committed to raising the wreck and recovering the crew's remains in a US$65-million salvage operation. They contracted with Dutch marine salvage companies Smit International and Mammoet to raise Kursk from the sea floor. It became the largest salvage operation of its type ever accomplished. The salvage operation was extremely dangerous because of the risk of radiation from the reactor. Only seven of the submarine's 24 torpedoes were accounted for.

=== Bow detached ===
Salvage divers first detached the bow from the rest of the vessel because it might have contained unexploded torpedo warheads and because it could break off and destabilise the lifting. The divers installed two large hydraulic suction anchors into the seabed and attached a high-strength tungsten carbide abrasive cable saw that was pulled back and forth over the bow between the anchors. Ten days were needed to detach the bow.

After the bow was cut free, the salvage crews raised several smaller pieces of wreckage. This included a piece of a torpedo tube weighing about a ton, which was analysed to determine if the explosion occurred inside or outside the tube. They salvaged a high-pressure compressed-air cylinder weighing about half a ton, to learn more about the nature of the explosion. They also raised a part of the cylindrical section of the hard frame and part of the left forward spherical partition, to determine the intensity and temperature of the fire in the forward compartment. Finally, they brought up a fragment of the sonar system dome.

=== Hull raised ===
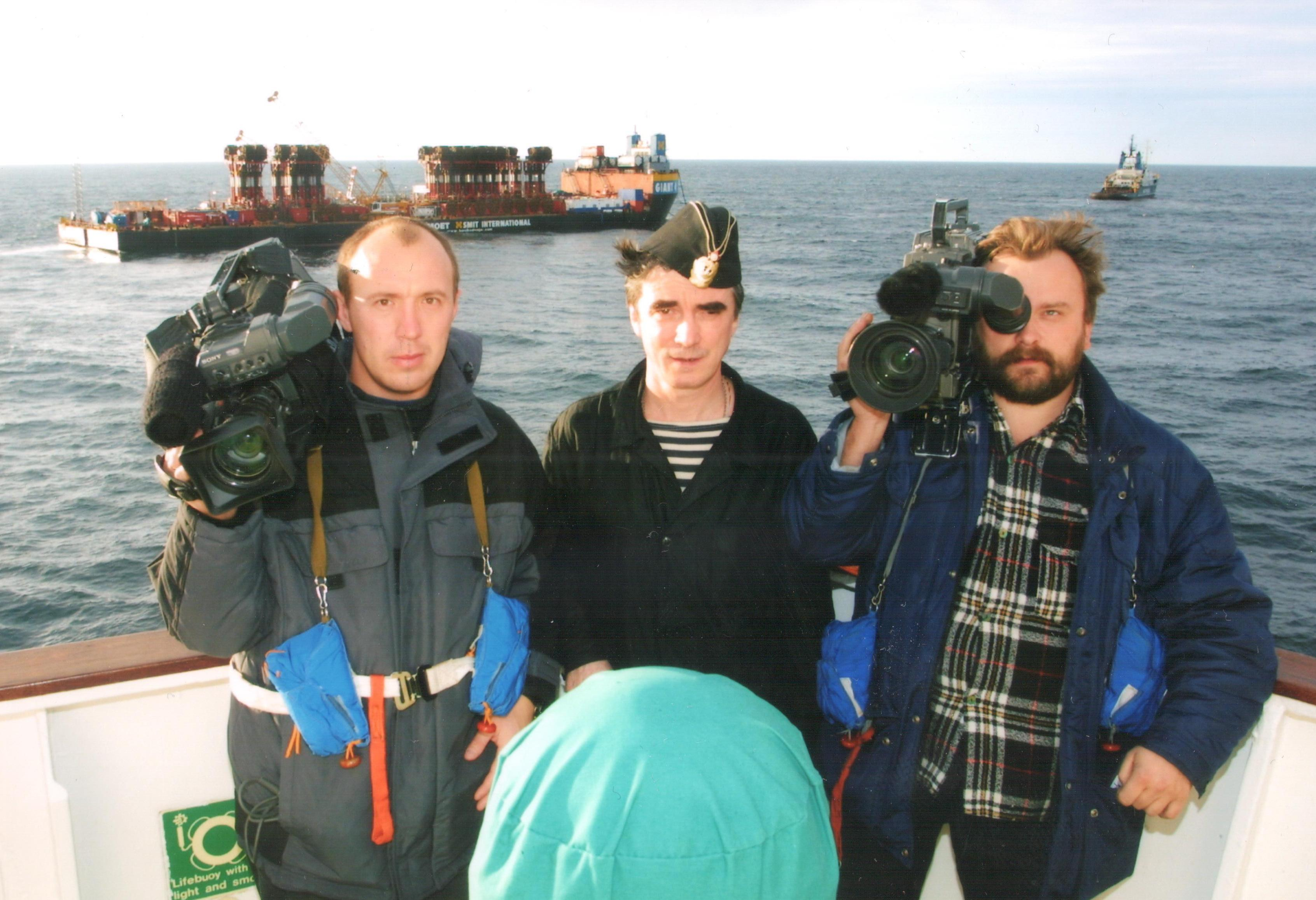
Giant 4 in background

Mammoet converted the 24,000 t (24,000-long-ton), 130 m (430 ft) long, Giant 4 semisubmersible deck barge to carry the sub. The ship was designed to carry huge loads on its deck, but Kursk would ride beneath the ship. Giant 4 had to be completely modified to retrieve and carry the sub underneath. To raise the remainder of the wreck, the salvage team planned an extremely complex operation that required them to design and build custom lifting equipment and employ new technologies. They wrote custom software that would automatically compensate for the effects of wave motion in the rough Barents Sea, which could sever the cables suspending the sub beneath the barge.

Divers cut a large hole in the barge's hull to allow room for the submarine's sail. Workers fitted the hull of Giant 4 with large saddles shaped to fit Kursk's outer hull. They cut holes through the barge to allow 26 hoisting cables to pass through. The team manufactured 26 giant cable reels to hold the more than 200 km (120 mi) of cable intended to raise the boat. The giant cable reels fed 26 huge hydraulic strand jacks, each mounted on a computer-controlled, pressurised pneumatic heave compensator powered by nitrogen gas that automatically adjusted for sea waves. Giant 4 was held in position over the submarine by an eight-point mooring system from four twin-drum winches on the main deck.

The dive support vessel DSND Mayo was equipped with dive chambers to accommodate the dive teams. They worked in six-hour shifts, and when they were not in the water, the divers remained in the saturation chambers for the entire 28 day operation. The divers used hydraulic abrasive water jets to cut 26 holes through the outer and inner hulls. The salvage divers mounted custom guidance rings around the holes in the sub and lowered guide cables to each through the holes in Giant 4. The team then used the four guide cables to lower a custom-made giant gripper similar to a toggle bolt, custom designed to fit each hole, before manoeuvring the cables through the guidance ring.

The crew lowered 26 groups of hoisting cables, each able to lift 900 tons, to the submarine and attached them to the grippers. The strand jacks lifted the 26 hoisting cables and slowly raised Kursk until it was beneath Giant 4. On 8 October 2001, 14 months after the disaster, and only five months after the contract had been awarded to them, the salvage team raised the remainder of the vessel in a 15-hour operation.

Once the sub was raised and joined to the barge, it was carried back under the barge to the Russian Navy's Roslyakovo Shipyard in Murmansk. Once there, two giant, custom-manufactured pontoons were floated under Giant 4 to lift the barge 20 m (66 ft) to allow it to enter a floating dry dock with Kursk attached underneath. Once in dry dock, the pontoons were pumped full of more air, lifting Giant 4 and allowing crews to remove the lifting cables and detach Kursk.

=== Bow destroyed on sea floor ===
The Russians initially intended to raise the bow from the sea floor—possibly containing undetonated torpedoes—but then decided it was too risky. Some analysts theorised the Russians may also have wanted to prevent foreign countries from accessing the debris, which had been classified as state secrets. They decided to destroy what was left of the bow where it lay and blew up the remnants in September 2002.

=== Crew in ninth compartment ===
Twenty-four men were assigned to compartments six through nine toward the rear of the boat. Of that number, 23 survived the two blasts and gathered in the small ninth compartment, which had an escape hatch. Captain-lieutenant Dmitri Kolesnikov, head of the turbine unit in the seventh compartment, and one of the three officers of his rank who survived the first explosion, apparently took charge. Emergency lighting was normally powered by batteries located in the first compartment which had been destroyed in the explosion, but the ninth compartment contained a number of independent emergency lights which apparently worked.

Kolesnikov wrote two notes, parts of which were released by Vice-Admiral Motsak to the media for the first time on 27 October 2000. The first, written at 13:15, 1 hour and 45 minutes after the second explosion, contained a private note to his family, and on the reverse, information on their situation and the names of those in the ninth compartment. The handwriting appears normal, indicating the sailors still had some light.

It's 13:15. All personnel from section six, seven, and eight have moved to section nine, 23 people are here. We feel bad, weakened by carbon dioxide ... Pressure is increasing in the compartment. If we head for the surface we won't survive the compression. We won't last more than a day. ... All personnel from sections six, seven, and eight have moved to section nine. We have made the decision because none of us can escape.

Kolesnikov wrote the second note at 15:15. His writing was extremely difficult to read.

It's dark here to write, but I'll try by feel. It seems like there are no chances, 10–20%. Let's hope that at least someone will read this. Here's the list of personnel from the other sections, who are now in the ninth and will attempt to get out. Regards to everybody, no need to despair. Kolesnikov.

The newspaper Izvestia reported on 26 February 2001 that another note, written by Lt. Cmdr. Rashid Aryapov, had been recovered during the initial rescue operation. Aryapov held a senior position in the sixth compartment. The note was written on the page of a detective novel and wrapped in plastic. It was found in a pocket of his clothing after his body was recovered.

Izvestia quoted unidentified naval officers who claimed that Aryapov wrote that the explosion was caused by "faults in the torpedo compartment, namely, the explosion of a torpedo on which the Kursk had to carry out tests". Izvestia also stated that Aryapov wrote that as a result of the explosions, the submarine was tossed violently about, and many crew members were injured by equipment that tore loose as a result. To the Russian public, it appeared that the Russian Navy was covering up its inability to rescue the trapped sailors.

=== Escape hatch unused ===
Analysis of the wreck could not determine whether the escape hatch was workable from the inside. Analysts theorise that the men may have rejected risking the escape hatch even if it were operable, and would have preferred to wait for a submarine rescue ship to attach itself to the hatch. The sub was relatively close to shore and in the middle of a large naval exercise. The sailors had every reason to believe rescuers would arrive quickly. Using the escape trunk was risky. The sailors were in a compartment that was initially at surface atmosphere pressure, so they did not risk decompression sickness (the bends) if they used the rescue hoods to ascend to the surface, but would not have survived long in the extremely cold Arctic water. Water was slowly seeping into the ninth compartment, increasing the internal pressure and thus the risk of decompression sickness and death when they ascended to the surface. In addition, some were likely seriously injured, making escape difficult.

When the nuclear reactors automatically shut down, the air purification system would have shut down, emergency power would be limited, and the crew would soon experience falling temperatures and complete darkness.

=== Death of survivors ===
Considerable debate arose over how long the sailors in the ninth compartment had survived. Russian military officers initially gave conflicting accounts, that survivors could have lived up to a week within the sub, but those who died would have been killed very quickly. The Dutch recovery team reported that they thought the men in the least-affected ninth compartment might have survived for two to three hours, but the level of carbon dioxide in the compartment exceeded that which people can produce in a closed space. Divers found ash and dust inside the compartment when they first opened that hatch, evidence of a fire, but this fire was separate from that caused by the exploding torpedo.

Captain-Lieutenant Kolesnikov, evidently the senior officer in the compartment, wrote a final note at 15:15 in the dark, giving evidence that he was alive at least four hours after the explosion. Vice Admiral Vladislav Ilyin, first deputy chief of the Russian Navy's staff and head of the Kursk Naval Incident Cell, concluded that the survivors had lived up to three days. However, other notes recovered in the ninth compartment were written no later than 6 hours and 17 minutes after the sinking.

In any event, the Russian rescue teams were poorly equipped and badly organised, while foreign teams and equipment were far away and not given permission to assist. It is unlikely Russian or foreign specialists could have arrived and reached the sub in time to rescue any survivors.

=== Forensic examination ===
While waiting for the boat to be brought to shore, a team of military doctors set up a temporary forensic laboratory at the military hospital in Severomorsk. After Giant 4 was floated out of the drydock, the drydock was drained, exposing Kursk's hull. Salvage teams cut into the compartments to drain the interior. Ordnance teams removed the missiles from outside the hull. On 23 October, two investigators and two navy commanders were the first to enter the hull. The next day, 24 October, eight teams of investigators and operational experts began analysing the debris found inside the boat and recovering and identifying remains of the crew. Working from a database of personal identification details, including the crew members' features, dental X-rays, birth marks, and tattoos, the doctors examined the bodies as they were brought to the laboratory.

Salvage team members found a large number of potassium superoxide chemical cartridges, used to absorb CO_{2} and generate oxygen to enable survival, in the ninth compartment. Autopsies of the crew recovered from the ninth compartment showed that three men suffered from thermal and chemical burns. Researchers concluded Captain-Lieutenant Kolesnikov and two others had attempted to recharge the oxygen-generation system when they accidentally dropped one of the superoxide cartridges into the seawater slowly filling the compartment. When the cartridge came in contact with the oily water, it triggered a chemical explosion and flash fire. Kolesnikov's abdomen was burned by acid, exposing the internal organs, and the flesh on his head and neck was removed by the explosion.

The investigation showed that some men temporarily survived this fire by plunging under water, as fire marks on the bulkheads indicated the water was at waist level at the time, but the flash fire consumed all remaining oxygen, so the men still alive after the flash explosion quickly asphyxiated. Water continued to seep into the compartment, and by the time rescue divers opened the compartment, only a small air pocket containing just 7% oxygen remained.

Bodies recovered from the ninth compartment were relatively easy to identify. Those recovered from the third, fourth, and fifth compartments were badly damaged by the explosion. Forensic examination of two of the reactor control room casualties found in compartment four showed extensive skeletal injuries, which indicated that they had sustained an explosive force over 50 g. These shocks would have immediately incapacitated or killed the operators. One sailor's body was found embedded in the ceiling of the second compartment. The bodies of three crewmen were completely destroyed by the blast and fire, and nothing of their remains could be identified or recovered.

== Aftermath ==
=== Public relations ===
The sinking of the ship, the pride of their submarine fleet, was a devastating blow to the Russian military. Kursk's participation in the exercise had been intended to demonstrate Russia's place as an important player on the international stage, but the country's inept handling of the crisis instead exposed its weak political decision-making ability and the decline of its military.

A year later, Putin commented on his response, "I probably should have returned to Moscow, but nothing would have changed. I had the same level of communication both in Sochi and in Moscow, but from a PR point of view, I could have demonstrated some special eagerness to return."

=== Navy actions ===
Kursk had been raised from the sea floor in October 2001 by the Dutch-led Mammoet-Smit international consortium, at a cost of $65 million, paid by the Russian Navy. Once at dock, the human remains and missiles were removed. The salvage team and the Russian Navy both assured the public that the reactors had been safely shut down and that no holes were cut in the housing of the submarine's two nuclear reactors.

Finally recognising the hazard of the HTP torpedoes, the Russian Navy ordered all of them removed from service.

==== Officers moved ====
Putin accepted the resignation of Igor Sergeyev from his position as minister of defence on 28 March 2001 and made him his assistant on strategic stability. He replaced him with Sergei Ivanov, who had previously been secretary of the Security Council of Russia. The position of minister of defence had always been filled by a professional member of the military. Ivanov had retired from the military in 2000, so his appointment as minister of defence while a civilian shocked the Russian military.

On 1 December 2001, Prosecutor General Vladimir Ustinov presented a preliminary report to Putin. Ustinov wrote that the entire exercise had been "poorly organized" and that the probe had revealed "serious violations by both Northern Fleet chiefs and the Kursk crew." Shortly afterward, Putin transferred the Northern Fleet commander, Vyacheslav Popov, and his chief of staff, Admiral Mikhail Motsak. As is common in such circumstances, both soon obtained jobs elsewhere in the government. Popov became a representative for Murmansk Oblast in the Federation Council, and Motsak became deputy presidential envoy for the North-Western Federal District. Popov and Motsak had championed the story that the accident had been caused by a collision with a NATO submarine. When Putin dismissed them, he made a point of repudiating the collision theory. In another example of a lateral transfer, deputy prime minister Ilya Klebanov had been an outspoken advocate of the theory that the Kursk had collided with a foreign submarine. He had also been in charge of the rescue operation and follow-up inquiry. In February 2002, Putin removed him from his position as deputy prime minister and made him minister of industry, science, and technology.

Putin dismissed the Northern Fleet's submarine commander, Vice-Admiral Oleg Burtsev, and in total removed 12 high-ranking officers in charge of the Northern Fleet. He said their dismissal had nothing to do with the Kursk disaster, but that they had been responsible for "serious flaws in the organizations of the service." However, all 12 had been involved with the exercise, the rescue operations, or the submarine itself. All were transferred to equal positions elsewhere in the government or in the business sector.

==== International co-operation ====
As a result of the disaster, Russia began participating in NATO search-and-rescue exercises in 2011, the first time any Russian submarine took part in a NATO-led exercise. The Russian Navy also increased the number of deep-sea divers trained each year from 18–20 to 40–45.

=== Awards to those killed ===
President Putin signed a decree awarding the Order of Courage to the entire crew, and the title Hero of the Russian Federation to the submarine's captain, Gennady Lyachin.

=== Memorials ===
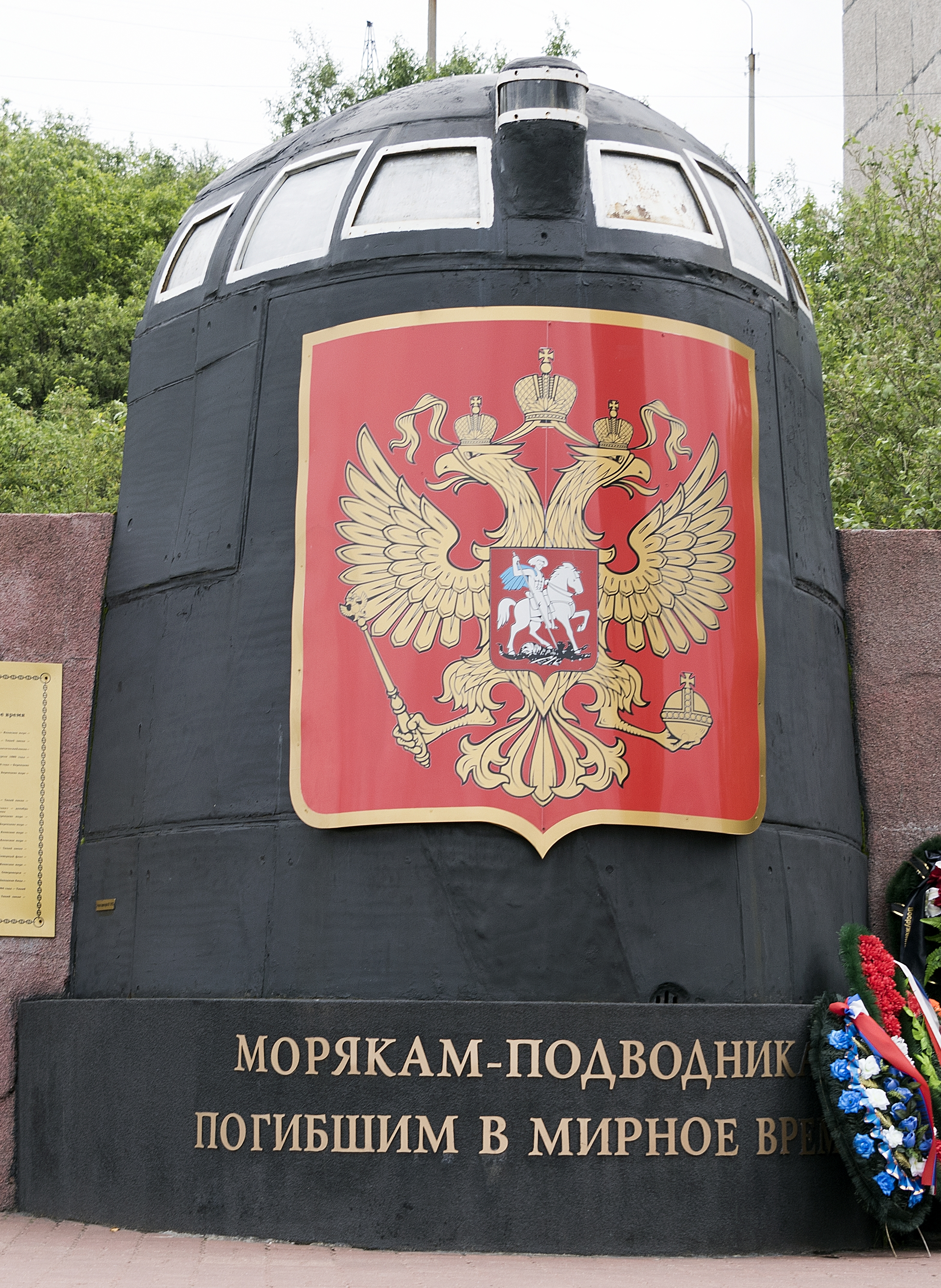
The sail of Kursk was rescued from a scrap yard and turned into a memorial at the Church of the Saviour on Waters in Murmansk. It is dedicated to the men who died aboard the sub: "To the submariners, who died in peacetime".

Outside the port city of Severodvinsk where the submarine was built, a large granite slab was erected on the sand dunes. It is engraved, "This sorrowful stone is set in memory of the crew of the nuclear submarine Kursk, who tragically died on 12 August 2000, while on military duty." Other memorials were built in Moscow, Sevastopol, Nizhny Novgorod, Severomorsk, and St. Petersburg's Serafimovskoe Cemetery. The city of Kursk, after which the vessel was named, erected a memorial made from fragments of its hull.

On 17 March 2009, journalist Tatyana Abramova from the newspaper Murmanskiy Vestnik found Kursk's sail in the yard of a scrap metal dealer; it had been left there after several years of negotiations failed to raise the estimated €22,000 needed for a memorial. The discovery sparked an outcry among citizens in Murmansk and they demanded the sail be turned into a memorial to the men who died. After considerable difficulty, the memorial was finally completed and dedicated 26 July 2009, Russia's Navy Day. It was placed on the observation deck of the Church of the Saviour on Water in Murmansk, the submarine's home port and location of the Vidyayevo naval base. It is among a memorial to sailors who perished during peacetime and lists the names of the crew.

On 31 July 2012, divers representing the relatives of Kursk's crew and the Northern Fleet command placed a 2 m (6 ft 7 in)-tall Orthodox Cross on the floor of the Barents Sea at the site of the disaster.

== In popular culture ==
- A Time to Die (2002, ISBN 0609610007), an investigative book on the events, was written by journalist Robert Moore.
- The song "Captain Kolesnikov" on the album Прекрасная любовь by Yuri Shevchuk and DDT is about the disaster and the letter recovered from Kolesnikov.
- Kursk, a 2009 play by the British playwright Bryony Lavery, was inspired by the disaster.
- Kursk, a 2018 film directed by Thomas Vinterberg and starring Colin Firth and Matthias Schoenaerts, was based on Robert Moore's book A Time to Die.

== See also ==
- August curse – Russian cultural phenomenon
- HMS Sidon – Royal Navy submarine sunk in Portland Harbour by explosion of a faulty torpedo
- Sinking of the Moskva – 2022 sinking of Russian warship Moskva during the Russo-Ukrainian War
- Sinking of PNS Ghazi – Tench-class submarine of Pakistan Navy
- KRI Nanggala (402) – Indonesian Navy
- USS Scorpion – Skipjack-class nuclear-powered submarine
- List of submarine incidents since 2000
- List of sunken nuclear submarines
