= August curse =

Russian cultural phenomenon

The August curse is a perceived phenomenon in Russia where the worst disasters and adverse events seem to have occurred in that country during August. The idea of the curse dates back to the 1991 "August Coup". Many possible explanations have been presented for this observation, ranging from fact-based to supernatural.

== Overview ==
In the early 21st century, journalists and observers noted that, since 1991, an unusual number of severe and fatal events in Russia had occurred in the month of August. Examples included deadly accidents and incidents, terrorist attacks, and the outbreak of two major wars.

== Explanation attempts ==
Russian media has speculated about possible explanations for such clustering. Seasonal influence on human activities, as opposed to the relative shutdown in winter, for instance, are among them.

For instance, many people take vacations in August: this leaves a kind of power-vacuum at some levels which terrorists and criminals can exploit.

Evgeny Nadorshin, chief economist at Trust Bank, has said that, for many events, the occurrence in August is simply a coincidence. But Nadorshin noted that vacations and official inattention were key factors in enabling the 2009 Nazran bombing.

Others have presented supernatural explanations for the August curse. Astrologist Elena Kuznetsova said in 2009, that the chaos will likely continue until mid-September because of the relative positions of Saturn and Uranus, and that Russia's horoscope is directly connected to the annual August turmoil.

The usually hot weather of August was identified in 2001 as a contributing factor. It is a time when military or insurgent actions can be undertaken.

Other far-reaching historical events have occurred in August in Russia, a prime time for military movements. For example, the Eastern Front of World War I was opened in August 1914 with the German invasion of Congress Poland, part of the Russian Empire. Germany started the Battle of Stalingrad that month (23 August 1942), in which the Soviets were eventually victorious.

== Examples ==
August
Year	Day	Casualties	Notes
1991	19–21	3 dead	Soviet coup d'état attempt
1992	27	Everyone on board (84)	Aeroflot Flight 2808 crashes in Ivanovo, Russia
1994	4		MMM Ponzi scheme collapses
1994	7	29 killed, 786 left homeless	Tirlyanskoe reservoir in Bashkortostan floods
1994	11	20 dead, 50 wounded	Train crash in the Belgorod Region
1996	29	Everyone on board (141)	Vnukovo Airlines Flight 2801 crashes in Norway
1996	31		First Chechen War ends, with the Chechens declaring victory
1998	17		Russian financial crisis
1999	7		Invasion of Dagestan, start of the Second Chechen War
1999	31		The first attack of the Russian apartment bombings
2000	8	13 dead	Moscow subway bombing
2000	12	118 dead	Kursk submarine disaster
2002	19	127 dead	Crash of a military helicopter in Chechnya
2003	1	44 dead 79 wounded	Suicide bomber drives a truck with explosives into a military hospital in North Ossetia
2004	24	90 dead	2004 Russian aircraft bombings
2006	22	170 dead	Flight 612 plane crash
2007	13		Bomb attack on a train between Moscow and St. Petersburg
2008	7–12		Russo-Georgian War
2009	17	2 dead 3 injured	Two planes collide during rehearsals for an air show in Moscow
2009	17	25 dead 64 injuries	Terrorist bombing in Nazran
2009	17	75 dead	Accident at the Sayano-Shushenskaya power station

== See also ==
- Apophenia
- Confirmation bias
- Tisha B'Av
