= Supreme Court of Ingushetia =

The Supreme Court of Ingushetia is the highest legal tribunal of the Russian subject of Ingushetia, which lies to the west of Chechnya.

The Court has undergone a tragic period in the 2000s, with Deputy Chief Justice Khasan Yandiev, being assassinated on April 13, 2008, and successor Aza Gazgireeva being assassinated on June 10, 2009.
