= Rescue buoy (submarine) =

Floating buoy attached to a submarine

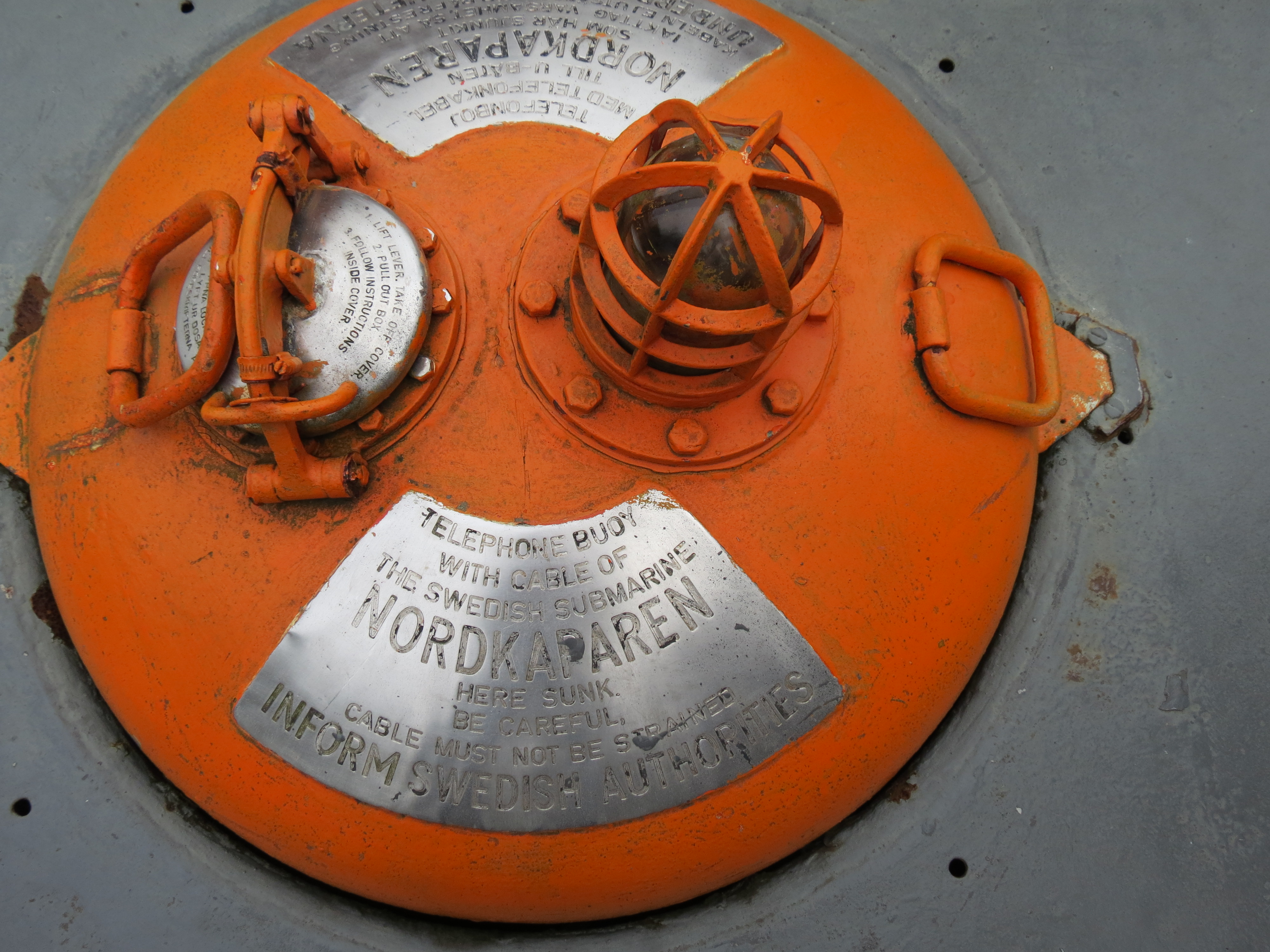
Rescue buoy of the Swedish submarine HSwMS Nordkaparen

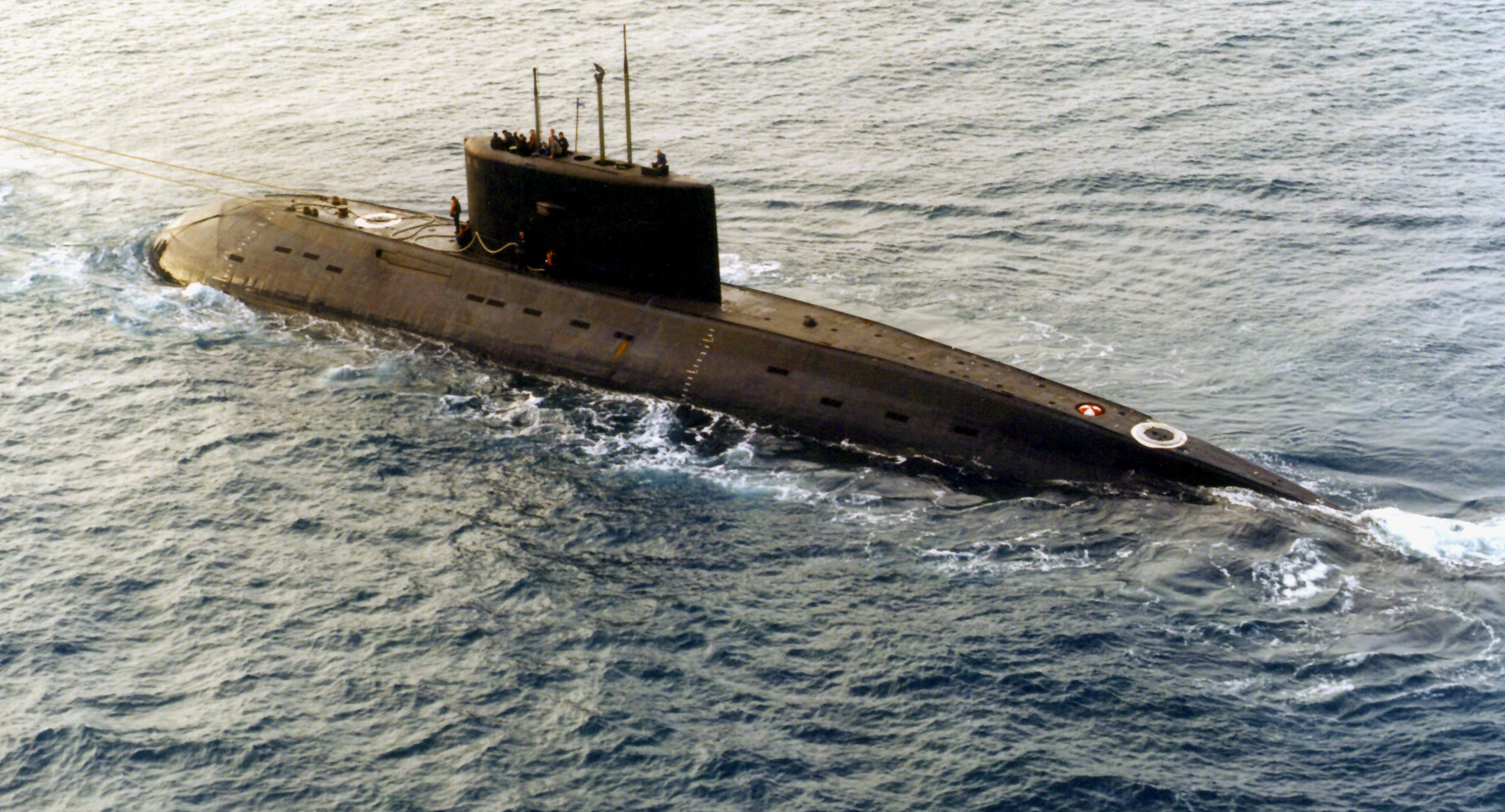
Iranian Navy Kilo-class submarine. The rescue buoy (red and white sectors) is just forward of the aft rescue hatch (white ring)

A submarine rescue buoy is a floating buoy, attached to a submarine and released in the event of a serious accident or sinking. The buoy remains attached to the submarine by a cable. Once on the surface it can indicate to rescuers the position of the submarine, and may include a telephone for communication with the trapped submariners.

== Soviet Navy ==
Rescue buoys were a prominent feature of Soviet submarines. A large steel buoy, painted red and white, could be seen in a deck housing on most submarine classes. Soviet submarines also had two rescue hatches and these were highlighted by white painted rings.

As it may be difficult to manually release the buoy, or the compartment where the buoy controls are located may have been flooded, the buoys were arranged with automatic releases, in the event of a fire or internal flooding. Such automatic sensors proved unreliable and buoys were sometimes released unexpectedly. Accidental release of a buoy would have been a hazard during wartime operations, or even during exercises. There is some indication that unreliable buoys were welded into place. This may have been a factor in incidents such as the Kursk submarine disaster, where the buoy was not released and it was difficult to locate the wreck.

== See also ==
- INS Dakar, ex-HMS Totem, lost in 1968 and the buoy washed ashore a year later
- USS Squalus used the buoy for help after sinking in 1939
