= Khasan Yandiev =

Russian judge (1948–2008)

Khasan Iragiyevich Yandiev (Russian: Хаса́н Ира́гиевич Янди́ев; 17 July 1948, Almaty, Kazakhstan – 13 April 2008, Karabulak) was a Russian judge who served as the deputy head of the Supreme Court of Ingushetia. He presided over the trials of a number of corrupt government officials and Islamic fundamentalists and rebels in Ingushetia, one of Russia's poorest and most troubled provinces.

Yandiev was born into an Ingush family in Alma-Ata, Kazakh SSR (now Almaty, Kazakhstan). (Following the 1940–44 insurgency in Chechnya, the Soviet government forced hundreds of thousands of Chechens and Ingush to move to Central Asia.) In 1980, he graduated from Andijan State Pedagogical Institute in Uzbekistan, where he studied physical education. He was a wrestling coach until 1986, when he earned a law degree from Tashkent State University.

Khasan Yandiev was killed on 13 April 2008, as he changed a tire near the Ingushetian town of Karabulak. He was 52 years old at the time of his death. Police believe he was killed by a sniper or assailants armed with an assault rifle using a silencer, since no one in the area heard a gunshot. Russian and Ingushetian authorities blamed both local Islamic fundamentalists, as well as Islamic rebels from neighboring Chechnya. Opponents of the government blamed Ingushetia's ineffective and repressive policies for the rise in the attacks.

Yandiev's successor as deputy Chief Justice on the Supreme Court, Aza Gazgireeva, was herself assassinated on 10 June 2009, just 18 months after Yandiev's assassination.
