= Ilya Klebanov =

Russian politician (born 1951)

- Илья Клебанов
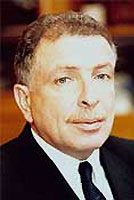

3rd Presidential Envoy to the Northwestern Federal District
- In office 1 November 2003 – 6 September 2011
- President: Vladimir Putin
- Preceded by: Valentina Matviyenko
- Succeeded by: Nikolay Vinnichenko

Minister of Industry, Science and Technology
- In office 17 October 2001 – 1 November 2003
- Prime Minister: Mikhail Kasyanov
- Preceded by: Aleksandr Dondukov
- Succeeded by: Andrey Fursenko (acting)

Personal details
- Born: Ilya Iosifovich Klebanov; 7 May 1951 (age 75) Leningrad, Soviet Union

Ilya Iosifovich Klebanov (Russian: Илья Иосифович Клебанов; born 7 May 1951) is a Russian politician and entrepreneur. He was the Plenipotentiary Presidential Envoy to the Northwestern Federal District of the Russian Federation. He has the federal state civilian service rank of 1st class Active State Councillor of the Russian Federation.

== Biography ==
Klebanov graduated in 1974 from the M.I. Kalinin Polytechnical Institute in Leningrad, where he majored in electrical engineering. After graduating, he moved up through the ranks of the Leningrad Optics and Mechanics Association (LOMO) in Saint Petersburg, leaving in 1997 after spending seven years as its director.

== Politics ==
From 1997 to 1998, he worked in the Saint Petersburg City Administration as a first deputy governor with responsibility for the economy and industrial policy. Klebanov was appointed the deputy prime minister of the Russian Federation responsible for military industries in May 1998. He was instructed to reform the arms industry while in this post. However, when he tried to reduce the industry's 170 organisations, he was met with strong opposition.

On 14 August 2000, as vice-premier, President Vladimir Putin put him in charge of the Kursk rescue operation following its disastrous sinking. On 29 or 20 August, he announced that the likely cause of the sinking was a "strong 'dynamic external impact' corresponding with 'first event'", probably a collision with a foreign submarine or a large surface ship, or striking a World War II mine. This later proved to be completely unfounded. In February 2002, Putin designated Klebanov as Minister of Industry, Science and Technology. This move was seen as a demotion by many.

On 1 November 2003 he was chosen to be the Presidential Envoy to the Northwestern Federal District. It has been suggested that this was part of a long running campaign to bring the Northern capital closer to Moscow.

== Entrepreneurship ==
In 2011, Klebanov resigned as the Presidential Envoy and focused on entrepreneurship. The same year, he became the head of the board of the petroleum product carriers Sovkomflot, which owns the world's largest fleet of the ice class oil tankers and gas haulers.

In 2013, Klebanov established a FOR Group (Russian: Группа ФОР) holding company to consolidate the assets owned by his family members. FOR Group established control over several fishing companies having bulk of the fishing quotas in Kaliningrad Oblast. By 2013, FOR Group was the largest fishery company of the Russian Northwest. By 2019, according to Forbes, FOR Group was the 9th largest fishing company in Russia.

Political offices
Preceded by Valentina Matviyenko	Presidential Envoy to the Northwestern Federal District; 1 November 2003–6 September 2011	Succeeded by Nikolay Vinnichenko
Preceded by —	Deputy Prime Minister; 1999–2002	Succeeded by —
