= Gennady Lyachin =

Russian naval officer

- Геннадий Петрович Лячин
- Born: 1 January 1955; Sarpinsky, Russian SFSR, Soviet Union
- Died: 12 August 2000 (aged 45); Russian submarine Kursk, Barents Sea
- Military career
- Allegiance: Russia
- Branch: Russian Navy
- Service years: 1972–2000
- Rank: Captain First Rank
- Awards: Hero of the Russian Federation

Gennady Petrovich Lyachin (Russian: Геннадий Петрович Лячин; 1 January 1955 – 12 August 2000) was a Russian navy officer. He was the commanding officer of the Russian submarine Kursk when the vessel suffered a series of explosions and sank on 12 August 2000.

== Biography ==
Lyachin was born in Sarpinsky in Volgograd Oblast. He entered the Navy in 1972 and graduated from the Higher Naval School of Submarine Navigation named for Lenin Komsomol in 1977 and was commissioned as an officer. He served as a weapons officer aboard the diesel-electric Juliett class cruise missile submarine K-58. From 1984 to 1986, as Captain 3rd Rank, he served as the executive officer of the K-77, also a Juliett Class. In 1986 he attended Higher Special Officer Classes of the Navy during which time he was promoted to Captain 2nd Rank.

In October 1988, Lyachin received his first command, the K-304 also a Juliett class. He held this position until the K-304 was decommissioned after the fall of the Soviet Union in 1991.

In April 1991, he was appointed executive officer of a nuclear submarine, the Project 949A Antey class (NATO reporting name Oscar-II) K-119 Voronezh and served aboard through 1996. He and the newly formed crew spent the time between September 1991 and March 1993 undergoing training in Obninsk.

Lyachin was promoted to the rank of Captain 1st Rank in 1996 and given command of the Voronezh's sister ship, the ill-fated K-141 Kursk, the very last Project 949A submarine to be completed, which had been commissioned only two years earlier. When the Kursk sank on August 12, 2000, Lyachin perished along with the rest of the 117 crew members.

President of the Russian Federation Vladimir Putin awarded the title of Hero of the Russian Federation to Lyachin posthumously "For courage and heroism, during performance of sailor's duties".

== See also ==
- List of Heroes of the Russian Federation
