= Vyacheslav Popov (admiral) =

Russian admiral

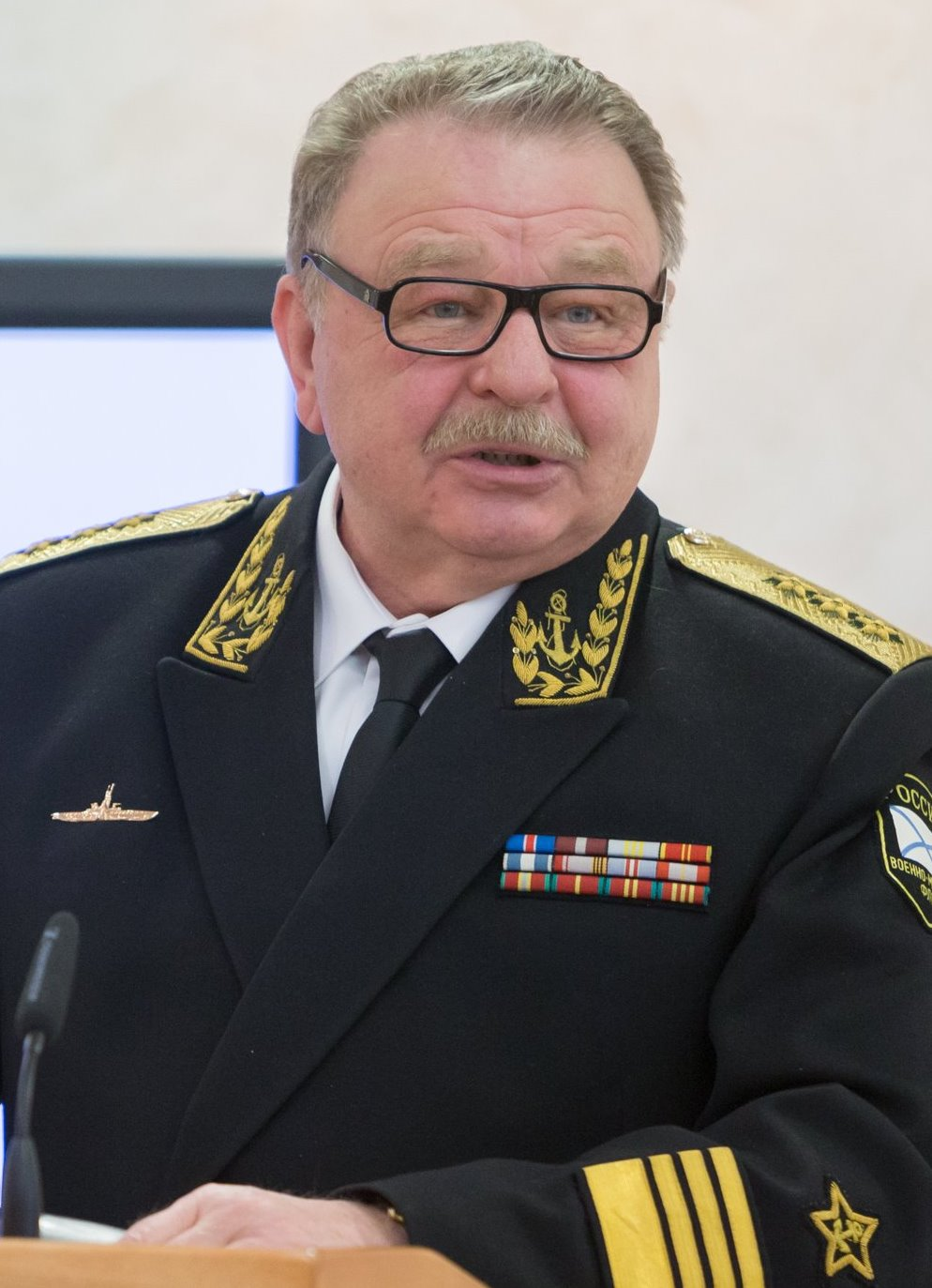
Popov in 2015

Admiral Vyacheslav Alekseyevich Popov (Russian: Вячесла́в Алексе́евич Попо́в; born 22 November 1946) is a retired admiral of the Russian Navy who commanded the Northern Fleet from 1999 to 2001, with his service period notably including the Kursk submarine disaster.

He was appointed Commander of the Northern Fleet on 29 January 1999. In August 2000 a major exercise was under way, in which the Kursk had a torpedo explosion. He handed over command on 15 December 2001.
