= Aza Gazgireyeva =

Ingush journalist (1954–2009)

Aza Adlopovna Gazgireyeva (Russian: Аза Адлоповна Газгиреева; 29 October 1954, Saran, Kazakhstan – 10 June 2009, Nazran), also known as Aza Gazgireeva, was an Ingush jurist who served as the deputy chief justice of the Supreme Court of Ingushetia. She was assassinated in Nazran on 10 June 2009.

Gazgireyeva became deputy chief justice on the Ingush Supreme Court following the assassination of her predecessor on the court, Khasan Yandiev, on 13 April 2008.

On 10 June 2009, gunmen opened fire on Gazgireyeva's chauffeur-driven van in the Ingushetian city of Nazran shortly after she dropped her children off at kindergarten. At least one gunman reportedly walked up to Gazgireyeva and shot her in the head. Five other people, including a one-year-old child, were injured during the attack on Gazgireyeva, according to Russian television broadcasts. The gunmen escaped in two cars. Gazgireyeva died at a hospital in Nazran hours after the attack.

Gazgireyeva is believed to have been killed because of her work on the court. She oversaw Supreme Court trials involving crimes carried out by Islamic extremists and separatist groups in Russia's North Caucasus region. She may have been targeted for her role in the investigation of a 2004 attack on Ingush police forces by Chechen militants. The chairman of the Ingush Supreme Court, Mikhail Zadvornov, told Russia's Interfax news agency that, "Aza Gazgireyeva was a judge with 25 years experience ... the reason for her murder was her professional activities." Ingushetia's deputy interior minister Valery Zhernov called Gazgireyeva's killing both "brutal" and "brazen".

Gazgireyeva's assassination came just eighteen months after the shooting death of her predecessor, Khasan Yandiev. Her death came amidst a series of attacks on officials in Ingushetia and other parts of Russia's troubled Caucasus region. Adilgerei Magomedtagirov, a Russian general and interior minister of neighboring Dagestan, was shot dead on 5 June 2009. The President of Ingushetia Yunus-Bek Yevkurov was critically wounded in a suicide bombing on 22 June 2009, less than two weeks after Gazgireyeva's death.
