= Ruslan Amerkhanov =

Russian official and politician (died 2009)

- Died: 12 August 2009; Magas, Ingushetia

Ruslan Amerkhanov (Russian: Руслан Амерханов; died 12 August 2009) was a Russian official and politician.

== Career ==
He served as the Construction Minister for the southern Republic of Ingushetia, located in Russia's troubled North Caucasus region.

Amerkhanov was described as a "very close and trusted official" and ally of the President of Ingushetia, Yunus-bek Yevkurov, who survived an assassination attempt in June 2009.

== Assassination ==
On 12 August 2009, two masked gunmen broke into Amerkhanov's official office of construction minister in Magas, Ingushetia at about 10:30 a.m. local time. The gunmen fired four shots at Amerkhanov, fatally wounding him in his office. The two assassins fled the scene in a VAZ-2114 with North Ossetian license plates. Amerkhanov's nephew and assistant, Magomed Amerkhanov, 25, was wounded in the attack.

Ingush officials and security officers believed that Amerkhanov's assassination is linked to a recent public investigation of corruption within Ingushetia's construction industry. Amerkhanov had ordered the review of the construction industry, which revealed that there had been illegal theft of funds from Ingushetia's budget. A spokesperson for Ingush President Yevkurov, who is still recovering in Moscow from his June 2009 assassination attempt, noted that, "The president is concerned that the murder is related to [Amerkhanov’s] professional activity." Corruption is widespread in Ingushetia, especially in the construction sector.

Ingush Acting President Rashid Gaisanov promised to arrest Amerkhanov's killers and said that security would be increased for all Ingush government officials.

== Personal life ==
Amerkhanov was married and had two children.
