= Rustaman Makhauri =

Chechen military commander (born 1978)

Rustaman Makhauri (born 1978) is a Chechen military commander and a close associate of Doku Umarov, the anti-Russian underground Chechen leader. He is suspected of being responsible for a series of attacks against the forces loyal to the governments in Chechnya and neighboring Ingushetia. He was captured by police in July 2009 in Ingushetia's district of Sunzhen and charged with involvement in the June 22, 2009 attack on the Ingush president Yunus-Bek Yevkurov.
