= Ahmed Malsagov (politician) =

Russian politician (born 1960)

Akhmed Malsagov
- Ахмед Мальсагов

President of the Republic of Ingushetia (acting)
- In office 28 December 2001 – 23 May 2002
- Preceded by: Ruslan Aushev
- Succeeded by: Murat Zyazikov

Chairman of the Government of the Republic of Ingushetia
- In office 24 November 1999 – 14 June 2002
- Preceded by: Magomed-Bashir Darsigov
- Succeeded by: Viktor Aleksentsev

Personal details
- Born: Akhmed Isayevich Malsagov; 26 October 1960 (age 66) Saumalkol, Kazakhstan, Soviet Union
- Children: 2 sons

Akhmed Isayevich Malsagov (Note: Russian: Ахмед Исаевич Мальсагов, Ingush: Малсаганаькъан Ӏийса Ахьмад, romanized: Malsaganäqhan 'iysa Ah'mad) (born on 26 October 1960) is an Ingush-born Russian politician who was a former interim president of the southern Russian republic of Ingushetia. The duration of his term was between December 2001 and May 2002.

== Biography ==
Akhmed Malsagov was born in Salmalkol in Kazakhstan on 26 October 1960.

In 1999, he was the Minister of Economy, and the First Deputy Chairman of the Government of the Republic of Ingushetia. From November 1999 to June 2002, he was the Chairman of the Government of the Republic of Ingushetia. From 28 December 2001 to 23 May 2002, Malsagov served as the Acting President of the Republic of Ingushetia.

In June 2002, Malsagov voluntarily resigned from the post of Chairman of the Government of the Republic of Ingushetia.

Since 2002, he has been engaged in entrepreneurial activity and teaches economics at the Ingush State University.

In 2007, he organized the exhibition "Ingushetia through the eyes of artists".

From November 2009 to September 2010, he was the Chairman of the Economic Council under the President of the Republic of Ingushetia, Yunus-bek Yevkurov. Since August 2012, he was a member of the Economic Council. On 11 November 2013, he was appointed Assistant-Advisor to the Head of the Republic of Ingushetia.

From December 2016 to April 2019, he headed the Ingush branch of the Russian Agricultural Bank.

== Political activity ==
He founded the Umka campaign, focused on the production of sausages, meat delicacies and semi-finished products, bakery products and cheese.

Critically assessed the pension reform, suggesting that it could aggravate the existing problems in the North Caucasus.

Pension reform will worsen the state of affairs in the region and, in particular, in Ingushetia. After all, it is known that we do not always have opportunities even for those who would like to work. There are simply no jobs, young people have no opportunity to apply their forces.

At the same time, the pension reform will not have a decisive impact on the socio-economic situation of the republic. However, it will be negatively affected by the loss of an important source of income for older people. Many families, including those with children, often live on the pension of the elderly, and this is their only income.

However, one should not forget that statistics often do not take into account the specifics of life in the North Caucasus. In our Ingushetia, real life is largely determined not only by earnings within the republic, but also by transfers from relatives who work in other regions of Russia. The very system of accounting for citizens' incomes ignores many factors. To a certain extent, residents of Ingushetia live even better than residents of the so-called "northern" regions. But if only because there are better quality food. At least they are no worse than in the rest of Russia. So the situation is somewhat different from what the statistics say.

It is not very customary to say, but there is a fact that people receive some income from the "shadow" economy. Citizens earn money, but they do not always pay taxes and register their business.

—
