= Ingushetia =

Republic of Russia in the North Caucasus

Republic of Ingushetia ГӀалгӀай Мохк (Ingush) Республика Ингушетия (Russian)
- Republic
- Flag Coat of arms
- Anthem: State Anthem of Ingushetia
- Interactive map of Republic of Ingushetia
- Coordinates: 43°12′N 45°00′E
- Country: Russia
- Federal district: North Caucasian
- Economic region: North Caucasus
- Capital: Magas
- Largest city: Nazran

Government
  - Type: People's Assembly
  - Head: Mahmud-Ali Kalimatov
  - Prime Minister: Vladimir Slastinin

Area
  - Total: 5,000 km^{2} (1,900 sq mi)

Population (2021 Census)
  - Total: ▲527,220: 96.4% Ingush; 2.5% Chechens; 0.7% Russians; 0.4% other
  - Rank: 74th
  - Density: 163.16/km^{2} (422.6/sq mi)
  - Urban: 54.8%
  - Rural: 45.2%

GDP (nominal, 2024)
  - Total: ₽95 billion (US$1.11 billion)
  - Per capita: ₽182,203 (US$2,138.01)
- Time zone: UTC+3 (MSK)
- ISO 3166 code: RU-IN
- Vehicle registration: 06
- Official language(s): Ingush • Russian
- Website: ingushetia.ru

Ingushetia or Ingushetiya, (Note: /ˌɪŋɡʊˈʃɛtiə/ ING-guu-SHET-ee-ə; Ingush: ГӀалгӏайче, romanized: Ġalġayçe, IPA: [ˈɣəɫɣəɪtʃʲe]; Russian: Ингуше́тия, IPA: [ɪnɡʊˈʂetʲɪjə]) officially the Republic of Ingushetia, (Note: Also referred to as the Ingush Republic.) (Note: Ingush: Гӏалгӏай Мохк, romanized: Ġalġay Moxk, IPA: [ˈɣəɫɣəɪ ˈmʷɔxk]; Russian: Респу́блика Ингуше́тия) is a republic of Russia located in the North Caucasus of Eastern Europe. The republic is part of the North Caucasian Federal District, and shares land borders with the country of Georgia to its south; and borders the Russian republics of North Ossetia–Alania to its west and north and Chechnya to its east and northeast.

Its capital is the town of Magas, while the largest city is Nazran. At 3,600 square km in terms of area, the republic is the smallest of Russia's non-city federal subjects. It was established on 4 June 1992, after the Checheno-Ingush Autonomous Soviet Socialist Republic was split in two. The republic is home to the indigenous Ingush, a people of Nakh ancestry. As of the 2021 Census, its population was estimated to be 527,220.

Largely due to the insurgency in the North Caucasus, Ingushetia remains one of the poorest and most unstable regions of Russia. Although the violence has died down in recent years, the insurgency in neighboring Chechnya had occasionally spilled into Ingushetia. According to Human Rights Watch in 2008, the republic has been destabilized by corruption, a number of high-profile crimes (including kidnapping and murder of civilians by government security forces), anti-government protests, attacks on soldiers and officers, Russian military excesses and a deteriorating human rights situation. In spite of this, Ingushetia has the highest life expectancy in all of Russia as of 2017.

== Etymology ==
The name Ingushetia (Ингушетия) derives from the Russian name of the Ingush, which in turn is derived from the ancient Ingush village Angusht, and from the Georgian suffix -éti. The name in Ingush is Ghalghaaichie (Гӏалгӏайче, /ʁalʁaitʃe/).

In the 1920–1930s there was not yet a unifying name for the Ingush Autonomous Oblast. Although the oblast was officially called Ingushetia, some scientists like Nikolai Yakovlev and Leonid Semyonov insisted that its correct name is Ingushiya (Ингушия).

== History ==
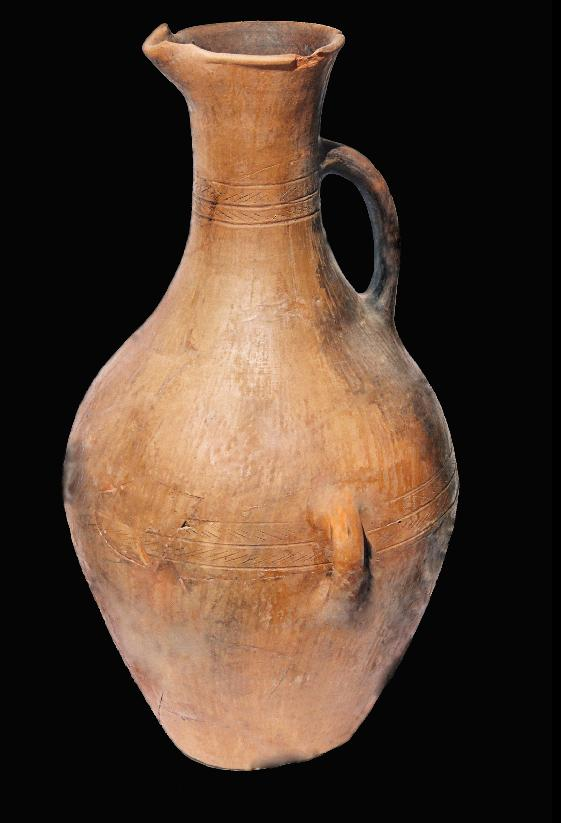
Pottery: an ancient Ingush vessel with three handles. The side handles used to tie the knots, and the vessel itself is well balanced for an operator to pour water down with one hand. Dzheirakhovski district of Ingushetia.

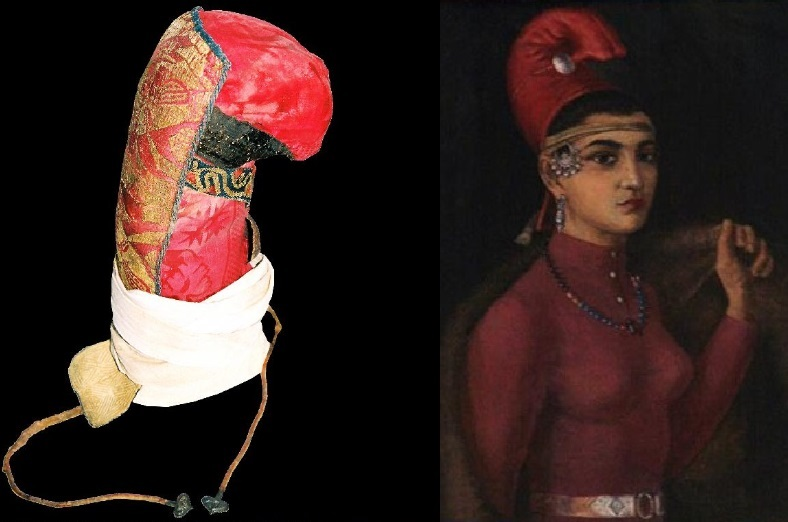
Kurkhars (600 BC – 1800s AD) is a traditional Ingush female head cover (hair is put into the "horns") which comes either single "horn" for usage as cushion with helmet, or double "horns" during peacetime which are covered in jewelry.

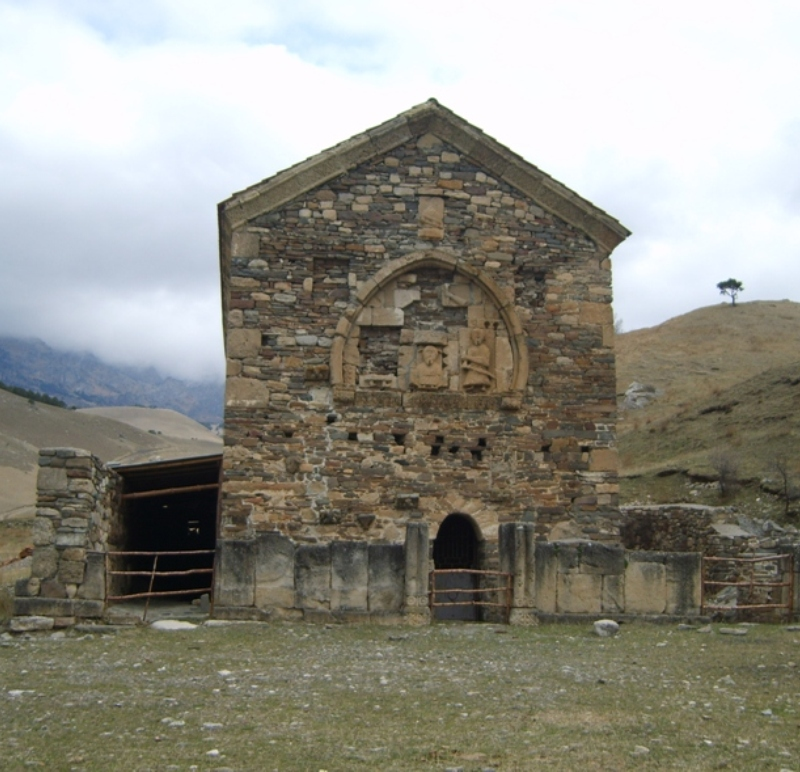
Ingush pre-Islamic beliefs. Temple Tkhabya-Yerd (temple of 2000) was initially a cuboid cyclopean masonry structure, which was rebuilt during the spread of Christianity in Ingushetia. The rebuilt wall was done with smaller stones shown at the entrance side.

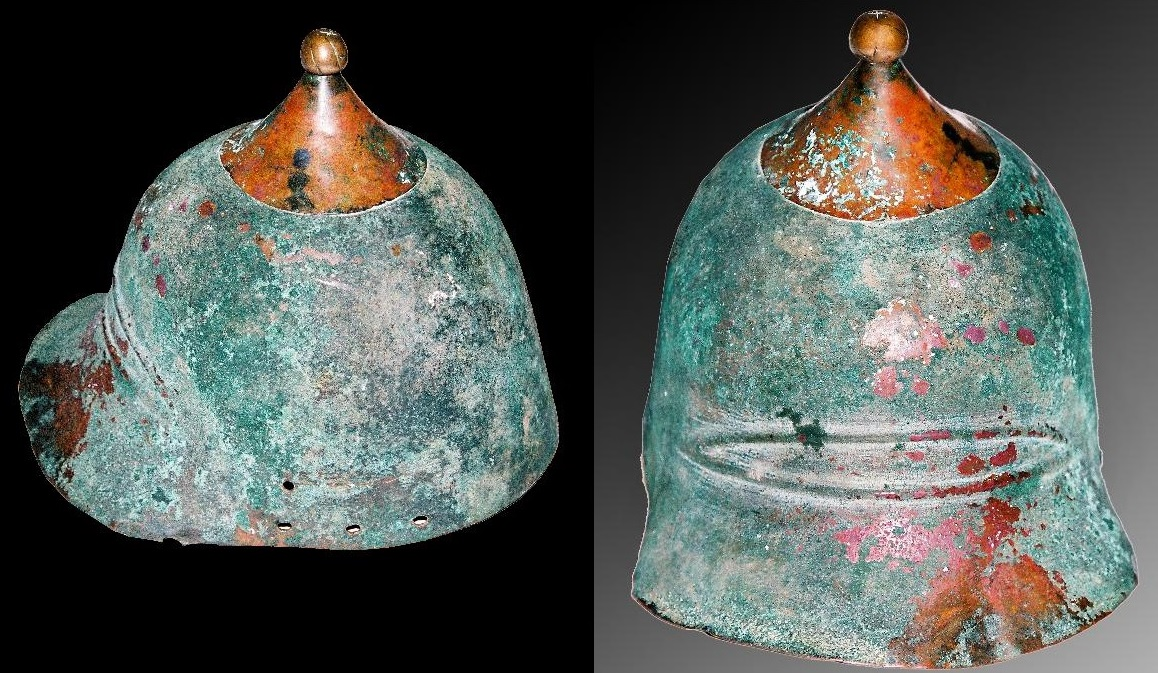
Ingush male warrior helmet.

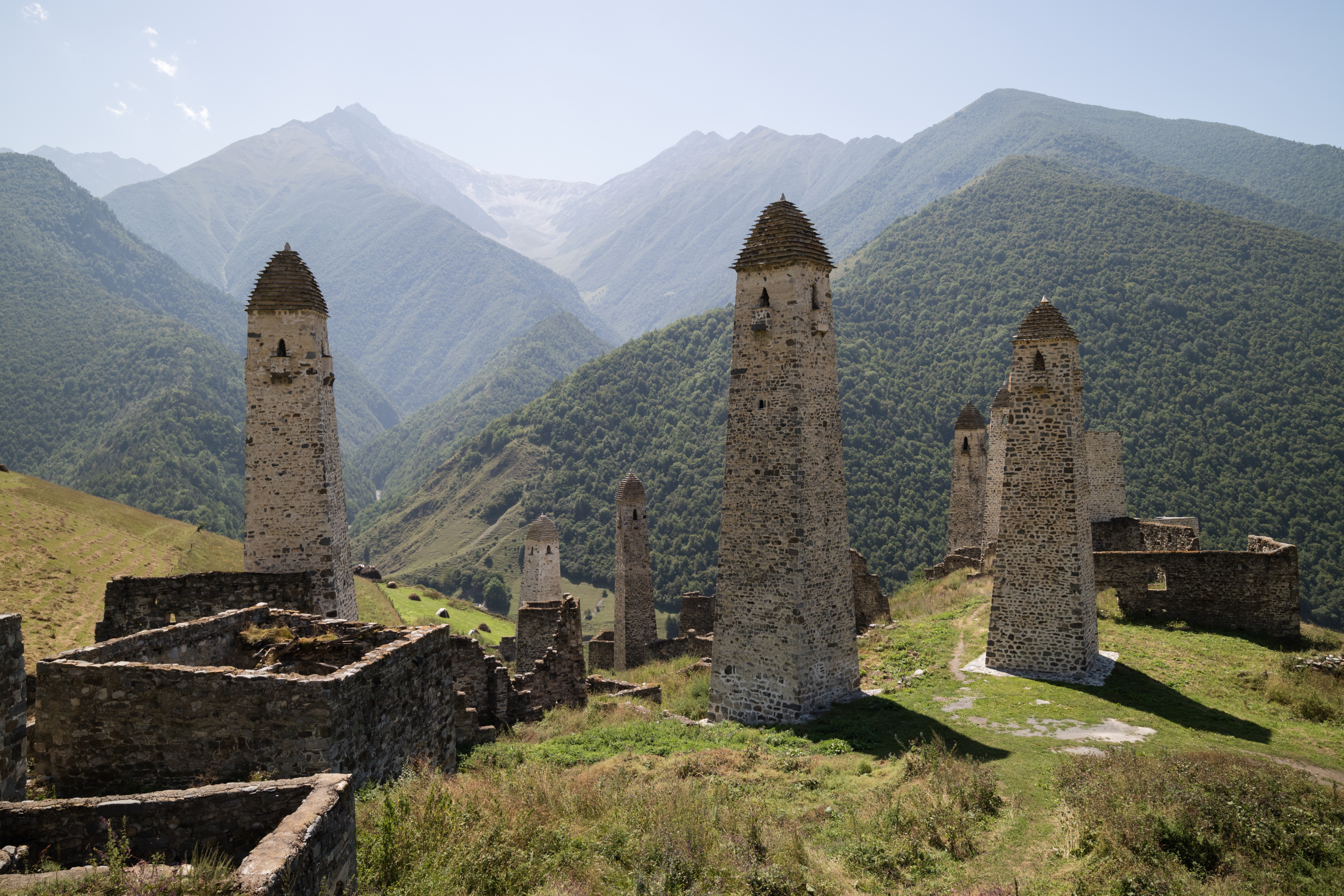
Typical Ingush medieval castle. Many of the towers and walls were destroyed by Russian army in 19th and 20th centuries.

6000–4000 BC

Neolithic era. Pottery is known to the region. Old settlements near Ali-Yurt and Magas, discovered in the modern times, revealed tools made out of stone: stone axes, polished stones, stone knives, stones with holes drilled in them, clay dishes etc. Settlements made out of clay bricks discovered in the plains. In the mountains, there were discovered settlements made out of stone surrounded by walls some of them dated back to 8000 BC.

20 BC

Strabo first mentions Geli in his reference to a nation in the center of the Caucasus. O.W. Wahl in 1875 in his book "The Land of the Czar" page 239 mentioned "These two opinions mentioned by Strabo come after all to the same point; for the Legi are the modern Lesghi, and the Geli the Ingush tribe Galgai, and the Keraunian Mountains are the northern ranges of the Caucasus as far as the Beshtaú." The same statement about Gelia being Ingush was made by a German professor Karl Koch in 1843 in his book "Reise durch Russland nach dem kaukasischen Isthmus" page 489. Jacobus Van Wijk Roelandszoon, Jacobus van Wijk (Roelandszoon) in 1821 book "Algemeen aardrijkskundig woordenboek volgens de nieuwste staatkundige veranderingen, en de laatste, beste en zekerste berigten" page 1050 also mention that Gelli or Gelad are the Ingush people which is mentioned by Zonaras.

1239 AD

Destruction of the Alania capital of Maghas (both names known solely from Muslim Arabs) and Alan confederacy of the Northern Caucasian highlanders, nations, and tribes by Batu Khan (a Mongol leader and a grandson of Genghis Khan) "Magas was destroyed in the beginning of 1239 by the hordes of Batu Khan. Historically Magas was located at approximately the same place on which the new capital of Ingushetia is now built" – D.V.Zayats

1300–1400 AD

War between the Alans, Tamerlan, Tokhtamysh, and the Battle of the Terek River. The Alan tribes build fortresses, castles, and defense walls locking the mountains from the invaders. Part of the lowland tribes occupied by Mongols. The insurgency against Mongols begins. "One map of the area during the Mongol period gives us a clue why there was not much written about the Vainakh— as the area of Chechnya-Ingushetia on that map is simply marked as "ungovernable". This is not surprising, as the majority of armies moving north or south would be interested in passing through the mountains and getting to their ultimate destinations as quickly as possible— leaving the peoples between the two passes relatively unmolested." – Schaefer, Robert W. "Insurgency in Chechnya and the North Caucasus: From Gazavat to Jihad" p. 51. In 1991 the Jordanian historian Abdul-Ghani Khassan presented the photocopy from old Arabic scripts claiming that Alania was in Chechnya and Ingushetia, and the document from Alanian historian Azdin Vazzar (1395–1460) who claimed to be from Nokhcho tribe of Alania.

1558 AD

Russian conquest of the Caucasus. 1558 Temryuk of Kabarda sends his emissaries to Moscow requesting help against Ingush tribes from Ivan the Terrible. Ivan the Terrible marries Temryuk's daughter Maria Temryukovna the Circassian (Kabardin) tsaritsa. Alliance formed to gain the ground in the central Caucasus for the expanding Tsardom of Russia against stubborn Vainakh defenders.

1562 AD

Joint Russian, Kabardian, and Nogay forces attacked Ingush. According to Russian sources 164 Ingush settlements were completely destroyed in this war. Lowland Ingushetia occupied by Russia and their Kabardian allies.

=== In Caucasian War and as part of Terek Cossacks Okrug ===
In the 18th century the Ingush were mostly pagan and Christian, with a Muslim minority. Beginning in 1588 some Chechen societies joined Russia (Shikh Okotsky; Albir-Murza Batayev). Russian historians claim that the Ingush volunteered to become a part of Russia. This assertion is mostly based on the document signed on 13 June 1810 by General-Major Del Pozzo and representatives of six Ingush clans; most other clans resisted the Russian conquest. In 1811, at the Tsar's request, Moritz von Engelhardt, a Russian envoy of German origin, visited the mountainous region of Ingushetia and tried to induce the Ingush people to join Russia by promising many benefits offered by the Tsar. The representative of the Ingush people rejected the proposal with the reply: "Above my hat I see only sky". This encounter was later used by Goethe in his 1815 poem, "Freisinn" ('free spirit').

On 29 June 1832, the Russian Baron von Rosen reported in letter No. 42 to Count Chernishev that "on the 23rd of this month I exterminated eight Ghalghaj (Ingush) villages. On the 24th I exterminated nine more villages near Targim." By 12 November 1836 (letter No. 560), he claimed that highlanders of Dzheirkah, Kist, and Ghalghaj had been at least temporarily subdued. In 1829 Imam Shamil began a rebellion against Russia. He conquered Dagestan, Chechnya, and then attacked Ingushetia hoping to convert the Ingush people to Islam, thus gaining strategic allies. However, the Ingush defeated Imam Shamil's forces. They successfully repulsed two more attempts in 1858. Nevertheless, locked in warfare with two strong opponents and their allies, Ingush forces were eventually devastated. According to the Russian officer Fedor Tornau, who fought with the aid of Ossetian allies against the Ingush, the Ingush had no more than six hundred warriors. However, the Russian conquest in Ingushetia was extremely difficult and the Russian forces began to rely more upon methods of colonization: extermination of the local population and resettlement of the area with Cossack and Ossetian loyalists.

The colonization of Ingush land by Russians and Ossetians began in the mid-19th century. The Russian General Evdokimov and Ossetian colonel Kundukhov in 'Opis no. 436' "gladly reported" that "the result of colonization of Ingush land was successful".

Renamed Ingush villages and towns:

- Ghazhien-Yurt was renamed Stanitsa Assinovskaya in 1847.
- Ebarg-Yurt was renamed Stanitsa Troitskaya in 1847.
- Dibir-Ghala (town) was renamed Stanitsa Sleptsovskaya in 1847.
- Magomet-Khite was renamed Stanitsa Voznesenskaya in 1847.
- Akhi-Yurt was renamed Stanitsa Sunzhenskaya in 1859.
- Ongusht was renamed Stanitsa Tarskaya in 1859.
- Ildir-Ghala (town) was renamed Stanitsa Karabulakskaya in 1859.
- Alkhaste was renamed Stanitsa Feldmarshalskaya in 1860.
- Tauzen-Yurt was renamed Stanitsa Vorontsov-Dashkov in 1861.
- Sholkhi was renamed Khutor Tarski in 1867.

Following Imam Shamil's repeated losses by the end of the Caucasian War, the Russians and Chechens unified their forces. Former Chechen rebels and their men joined the Russian ranks. On 3 November 1858, General Evdokimov ordered (order N1896) a former rebel commander, naib Saib-Dulla Gekhinski (Saadulla Ospanov) of Chechnya to attack and destroy Ingush settlements near the Assa and Fortanga rivers: Dattikh, Meredzhi, Aseri, Shagot-Koch and others. After their defeats in combat, the remaining Ingush clans resorted mostly to underground resistance.

The Russians built the fortress Vladikavkaz ("ruler of the Caucasus") on the place of Ingush village of Zaur. Russian General Aleksey Petrovich Yermolov wrote in a letter to the Tsar of Russia, "It would be a grave mistake for Russia to alienate such a militaristic nation as the Ingush." He suggested the separation of the Ingush and Chechens in order for Russia to win the war in the Caucasus. In another letter from General Ermolov to Lanski (dated 12 January 1827) on the impossibility of forceful Christianization of the Ingush, Yermolov wrote: "This nation, the most courageous and militaristic among all the highlanders, cannot be allowed to be alienated ..."

The last organized rebellion (the so-called "Nazran insurrection") in Ingushetia occurred in 1858 when 5,000 Ingush launched an attack against Russian forces, but lost to the latter's superior numbers. The rebellion signaled the end of the First Russo-Caucasian War. In the same year, the Tsar encouraged the emigration of Ingush and Chechens to Turkey and the Middle East by claiming that "Muslims need to live under Muslim rulers". His apparent motivation was to depopulate the area for the settlement of Ossetians and Cossacks. Some Ingush became exiled to deserted territories in the Middle East where many of them died. The remainder were culturally assimilated by Russification. It was estimated that eighty per cent of the Ingush had left Ingushetia for the Middle East by 1865.

After the Russian Revolution of 1917, the Soviets promised the Ingush that the villages and towns annexed during the colonization would be returned to the Ingush. Ingushetia became a major battleground between the old archenemies: General Denikin, and Ingush resistance fighters. In his memoirs, general Denikin wrote:

"Ingush people are the least numerous, most welded, and strongly martial organization. They were, in essence, the supreme arbiter of the North Caucasus. The moral of the appearance was defined long ago in Russian text-books of geography, "the chief occupation – animal husbandry and robbery ..." The last one of the two reached special art in the society. Political aspirations came from the same trend. The Ingush are mercenaries of the Soviet regime, they support it but don't let the spread of it in their province. At the same time, they tried to strike up relations with Turkey and sought the assistance from the Turks from Elisavetpol, and Germany – from Tiflis. In August, when the Cossacks and Ossetians captured Vladikavkaz, the Ingush intervened and saved the Soviet Board of Commissioners of Terek, but sacked the city and captured the state bank and mint. They robbed all the neighbors: the Cossacks and Ossetians in the name of "correcting historical errors" for a shortage of land, the Bolsheviks – in return for their services, Vladikavkaz citizens – for their helplessness, and the Kabardins – just out of habit. They were hated by everyone, and they did their "craft" in unison, well organized, in a big way, becoming the richest tribe in the Caucasus."

— Anton Denikin, Essays on the Russian Troubles (1925)

=== As part of the Mountainous Republic of the Northern Caucasus ===
On 21 December 1917 Ingushetia, Chechnya, and Dagestan declared independence from Russia and formed a single state called the "United Mountain Dwellers of the North Caucasus" (also known as Mountainous Republic of the Northern Caucasus), which was recognized by the Central Powers (Germany, Austro-Hungary and Turkey), Georgia, and Azerbaijan (which declared their independence from Russia in 1918) as an independent state. For example, Anna Zelkina writes that in May 1918 the first country to recognize independence was Turkey:

The First Congress of the North Caucasus formed a Provisional Government of the North Caucasian Free State (SeveroKavkazskoye Svobodnoye Gosudarstvo) and in May 1918 declared the establishment of the North Caucasian Republic. The only country to recognize it was Turkey.

Later Germany and others followed the recognition. According to P. Kosok:

Azerbaidzhan and Armenia (May 28, 1918). All three states then concluded independent treaties with Turkey, which similarly acknowledged the independence of the Northern Caucasus and concluded a treaty of friendship with it on June 8, 1918. An exchange of diplomatic notes then took place between the head of the German Extraordinary Delegation, General von Lossov, and the North Caucasian Minister of Foreign Affairs, Bammat, resulting in the de facto recognition by Germany of the independence of the Northern Caucasus.

According to the British War Office, Germans tried to establish a military base in Ingushetia:

...the German Command with the object of securing the presence of German regiments within Ingush territory. The Ingushi declare that all attempts of any foreign armed force to enter into the Terek region will be regarded by the Ingushi as an attack upon themselves, and the Ingushi will oppose all their forces to such attempts.

The capital of the new state was moved to Temir-Khan-Shura (Dagestan). The first prime minister of the state was elected Tapa Chermoyev, a Chechen prominent statesman; the second prime minister was Ingush statesman Vassan-Girey Dzhabagiev who also was the author of the Constitution of the land in 1917. In 1920 he was reelected for a third term. In 1921, Russia attacked and occupied the country, forcefully merging it with the Soviet state. The Caucasian war for independence continued and the government went into exile.

=== As part of Chechen-Ingush ASSR ===
Cossack General Andrei Shkuro in his book writes:

Ingushetia was the most unanimous and entirely Bolshevik. Ever since the conquest of the Caucasus, the brave and freedom-loving Ingush, who were desperately defending their independence, were partly exterminated and partly driven into barren mountains. The Terek Cossacks were settled on the fertile lands that had belonged to them, and Cossacks founded their villages on the wedge that had cut into Ingushetia. Deprived of the opportunity to earn their bread in an honest way, the Ingush lived by robbery and raids on the Cossack lands. Even in peacetime, the Terek Cossacks bordering Ingush did not go to the field without rifles. Not a day went by without shooting and bloodshed. Considering the Cossacks as oppressors, and the Cossack lands were still theirs, the Ingush mercilessly took revenge on them. The relationship was created completely irreconcilable; further cohabitation was unthinkable. It was necessary either to exterminate the Ingush completely, or to evict the Cossacks from the former Ingush lands, returning those to their former owners.

The Soviets confiscated the remaining Ingush properties by collectivization and dekulakization and unified Chechnya and Ingushetia into Chechen-Ingush ASSR.

During World War II Ingush youth were drafted into the Red Army. In August 1942 Nazi German forces captured half of the North Caucasus within thirty-three days moving from Rostov-On-Don to Mozdok 560 km or almost 17 km per day (see Battle of the Caucasus). From Mozdok to Malgobek same thirty three days, 20 km the German forces moved roughly 600 meters per day and were stopped only at Ordzhonikidze (modern-day Vladikavkaz) and Malgobek which were mostly populated by Ingush before the genocide of 23 February 1944. The fighting for Malgobek was so intense that the small town was captured and recaptured four times until the Germans finally retreated.

According to the Soviet military newspaper Red Star, after receiving the news about German brutality toward civilians in Kabardino-Balkaria, Ingush people declared Jihad (Gazavat) against the Germans. Stalin planned the expansion of the USSR in the south through Turkey. Muslim Chechens and Ingush could become a threat to the expansion. In February 1944 near the end of World War II, NKVD units flooded the Chechen-Ingush ASSR. The maneuvers were disguised as military exercises of the southern district.

=== Genocide of 1944 ===
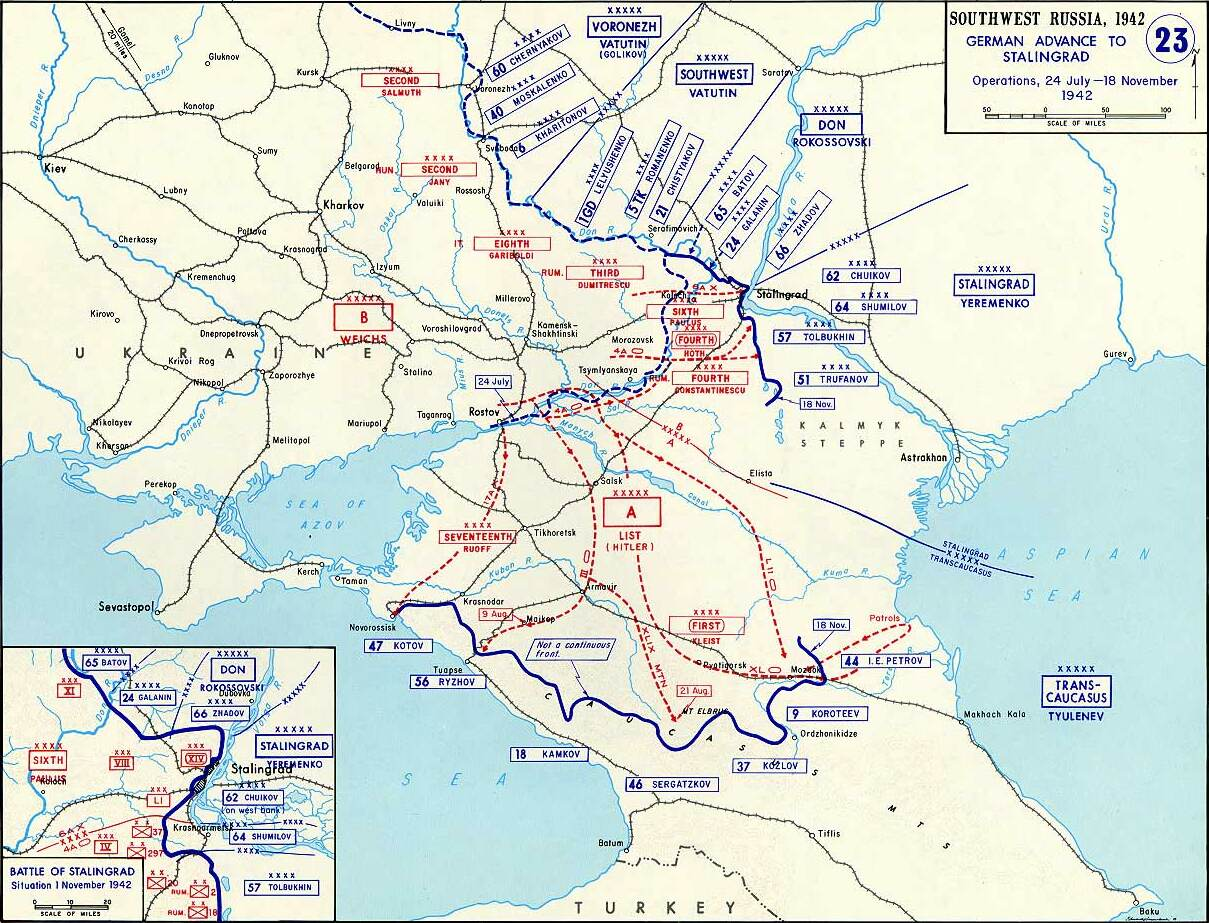
World War II, 1942 The Northern Caucasian battle, front line in Chechen-Ingush ASSR from Ordzhonikidze (Vladikavkaz) to Malgobek.

During World War II, in 1942 German forces entered the North Caucasus. For three weeks, the Germans captured over half of the North Caucasus. They were only stopped at two cities in the Chechen-Ingush ASSR: Malgobek and Ordzhonikidze (a.k.a. 'Vladikavkaz') by the heroic resistance of the native population. On 23 February 1944, Ingush and Chechens were falsely accused of collaborating with the Nazis, and the entire Ingush and Chechen populations were deported to Kazakhstan, Uzbekistan, and Siberia in Operation Lentil, on the orders of Soviet leader Joseph Stalin, while the majority of their men were fighting on the front. The initial phase of the deportation was carried out on American-supplied Studebaker trucks specifically modified with three submachine gun-nest compartments above the deported to prevent escapes. American historian Norman Naimark writes:

Troops assembled villagers and townspeople, loaded them onto trucks – many deportees remembered that they were Studebakers, fresh from Lend-Lease deliveries over the Iranian border – and delivered them at previously designated railheads. ...Those who could not be moved were shot. ...[A] few fighters aside, the entire Chechen and Ingush nations, 496,460 people, were deported from their homeland.

Destinations of the resettled Chechens and Ingush inside the Soviet Union

The deportees were gathered at railroad stations and during the second phase transferred to the cattle railroad carts. Up to 30% of the population perished during the journey or in the first year of the exile. The Prague Watchdog claims that "in the early years of their exile about half of the Chechens and Ingush died from hunger, cold and disease". The deportation was classified by the European Parliament in 2004 as genocide. After the deportation Ingush resistance against the Soviets began again. Those who escaped the deportation, including shepherds who were high in the mountains during the deportations, formed rebel groups which constantly attacked Russian forces in Ingushetia. Major rebel groups were led by Akhmed Khuchbarov, the Tsitskiev brothers, and an Ingush female sniper, Laisat Baisarova. The last one of the male Ingush rebels was killed in 1977 by the KGB officers, while Baisarova was never captured or killed. American professor Johanna Nichols, who specializes in Chechen and Ingush philology, provided the theory behind the deportation:

In 1944 the nationalities themselves were abolished and their lands resettled when the Chechen and Ingush, together with the Karachay-Balkar, Crimean Tatars, and other nationalities were deported en masse to Kazakhstan and Siberia, losing at least one-quarter and perhaps half of their population in transit. (The reason, never clarified, seems to have been Stalin's wish to clear all Muslims from the main invasion routes in a contemplated attack on Turkey.)

=== After return from Central Asia ===
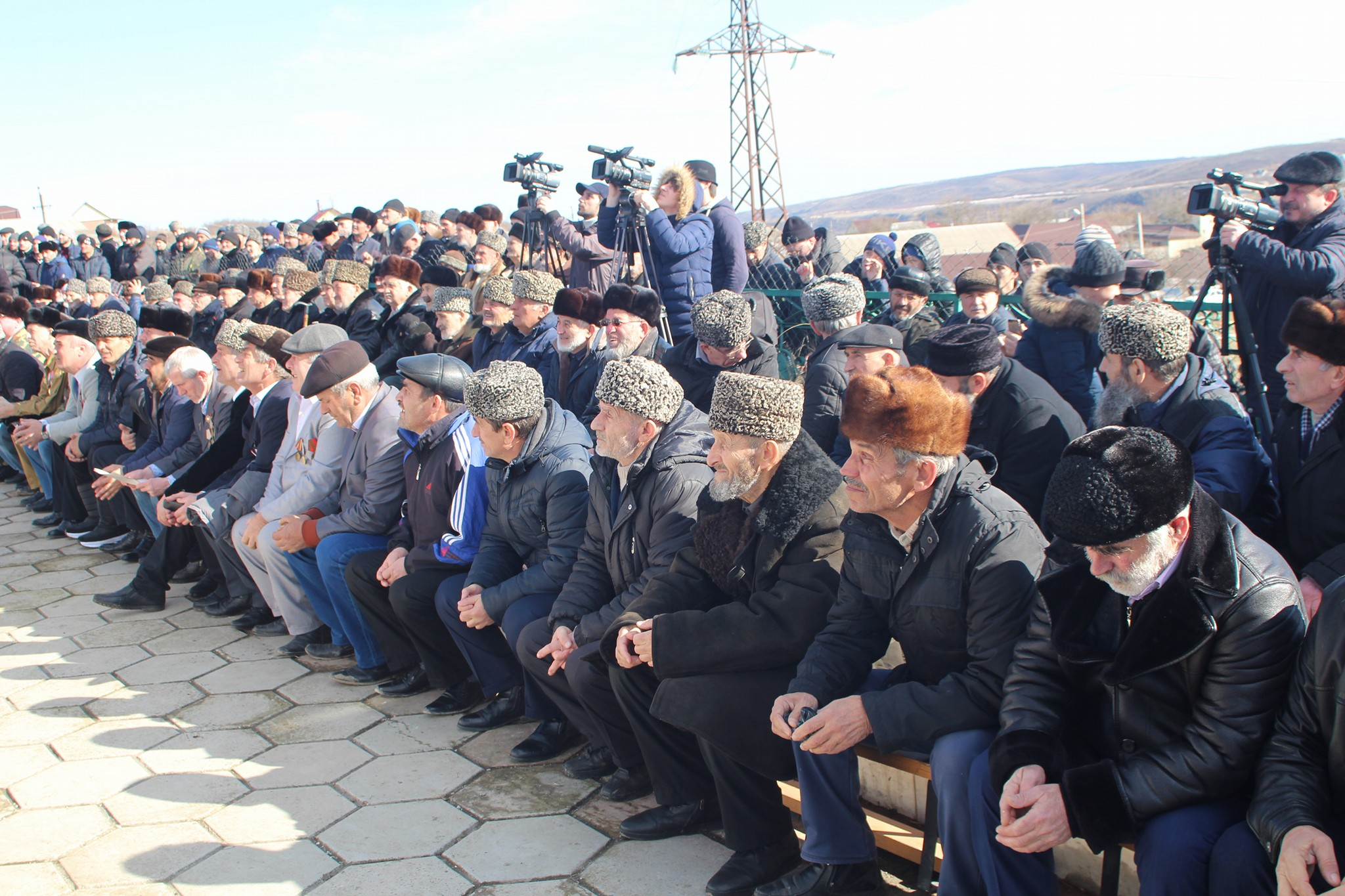
Meeting in Aukh dedicated to the anniversary of deportation, 27 February 2017

Map of the Chechen-Ingush ASSR from 1957 to 1991

After 13 years of exile, the Ingush were allowed to return to Chechen-Ingushetia (but not to Ordzhonikidze a.k.a. "Vladikavkaz" or the Prigorodny District). Most of Ingushetia's territory had been settled by Ossetians and part of the region had been transferred to North Ossetia. The returning Ingush faced considerable animosity from the Ossetians. The Ingush were forced to buy their homes back from the Ossetians and Russians. These hardships and injustices led to a peaceful Ingush protest in Grozny on 16 January 1973, which was crushed by Soviet troops. In 1989, the Ingush were officially rehabilitated along with other peoples that had been subjected to repressions.

=== Post-Soviet period ===
In 1991, when the Chechens declared independence from the Soviet Union to form the Chechen Republic of Ichkeria, the Ingush chose to secede from the Chechen-Ingush Republic. This was confirmed with the referendum and in 1992 the Ingush joined the newly created Russian Federation to try to resolve the conflict with Ossetia peacefully, also in the hope that the Russians would return their land as a token of their loyalty.

=== Ethnic cleansing of 1992 ===
However, ethnic tensions in North Ossetia which were orchestrated by Ossetian nationalists (per Helsinki Human Right Watch), led to an outbreak of violence in the Ossetian–Ingush conflict in October–November 1992, when another ethnic cleansing of the Ingush population started.

Over 60,000 Ingush civilians were forced from their homes in the Prigorodny District of North Ossetia. As a result of the conflict, pro-Russian general Ruslan Aushev, a decorated war hero from the War in Afghanistan, was appointed by the Russian government as the first president of Ingushetia to stop the spread of the conflict. Partial stability returned under his rule.

=== First and Second Chechen Wars ===
In 1994, when the First Chechen War started, the number of refugees in Ingushetia from both conflicts doubled. According to the UN, for every citizen of Ingushetia, one refugee arrived from Ossetia or Chechnya. This influx was very problematic for the economy, which collapsed after Aushev's success. The second Russo-Chechen war which started in 1999 brought more refugees (at some point there was one refugee for every Ingush citizen: 240,000 from Chechnya plus 60,000 from North Ossetia at the peak in 2000) and misery to Ingushetia. In 2001, Aushev was forced to leave his presidency and was succeeded by Murat Zyazikov, a former KGB general. The situation worsened under his rule. Many young Ingush men were abducted by Russian and Ossetian death squads. according to human rights watchdogs Memorial and Mashr.

The number of rebel attacks in Ingushetia rose, especially after the number of Russian security forces was tripled. For example, according to a Russian news agency a murder of an ethnic-Russian school teacher in Ingushetia was committed by two ethnic-Russian and ethnic-Ossetian soldiers; Issa Merzhoev the Ingush Police detective who solved the crime was shot at and killed by "unknown" assailants shortly after he had identified the murderer. At least four people were injured when a vehicle exploded on 24 March 2008. An upsurge in violence in these months targeted local police officers and security forces. In January 2008, the Federal Security Service of the Russian Federation launched a "counter-terrorism" operation in Ingushetia after receiving information that insurgents had been preparing a series of attacks.

Early in August 2008, the war between Georgia and South Ossetia broke out, in which the Russian Federation subsequently became involved. After the outbreak of the war, there were virtually no more attacks or abductions of Ingush civilians by "unknown" forces. Most of the Russian forces were transferred to North and South Ossetia 31 August 2008 Magomed Yevloyev, the head of Ingush opposition and the owner of the website ingushetiya.ru, was killed by Russian security forces Shortly before the unrecognized opposition group People's Parliament of Ingushetia Mekhk-Kkhel called for the recognition of the Russian semi-autonomous republic's independence, opposition activist Magomed Khazbiyev proclaimed, "We must ask Europe or America to separate us from Russia."

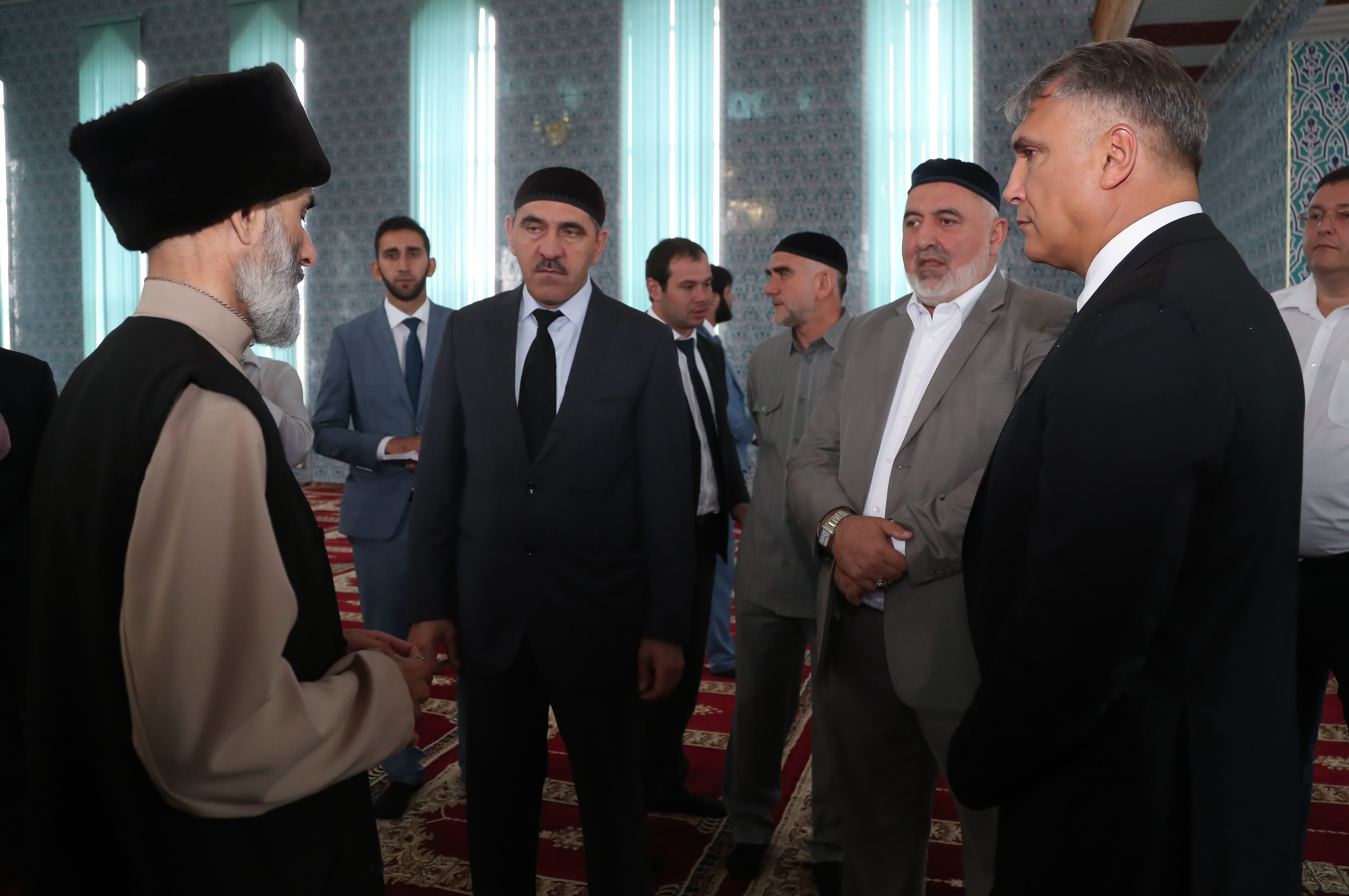
Ingushetia's President Yunus-bek Yevkurov at a mosque in Ingushetia on 14 July 2018

On 18 October 2008, a Russian military convoy came under grenade attack and machine gun fire near Nazran. Official Russian reports of the ambush, which has been blamed on local Muslim separatists, said two soldiers were killed and at least seven injured. Reports from Ingush opposition sources suggested as many as forty to fifty Russian soldiers were killed.

On 30 October 2008, Zyazikov was dismissed from his office (he himself claimed he resigned voluntarily). On the next day, Yunus-Bek Yevkurov was nominated by Dmitry Medvedev and approved as president by the People's Assembly of Ingushetia (later the title President was renamed Head). This move was endorsed by major Russian political parties and by the Ingush opposition. Under the current rule of Yevkurov, Ingushetia seems much calmer, showing some semblance of the Russian government. Attacks on policemen have fallen by 40% and abductions by 80%.

=== Military history ===
According to professor Johanna Nichols, in all the recorded history and reconstructable prehistory, the Ingush people have never undertaken battle except in defense. In the 3rd and 2nd centuries BC Pharnavaz, his son Saurmag the Iberian kings, and the relatives of Ingush people per Leonti Mroveli, received military assistance from Ingush people in defense of Iberia against the Kartli occupation.

During World War I, 500 cavalrymen from an Ingush regiment of the Wild Division attacked the German Iron Division. The Russian Emperor Nicholas II, assessing the performance of the Ingush and Chechen regiments during the Brusilov breakthrough on the Russian-German front in 1915 wrote in a telegram to the Governor-General of the Tersky region Fleisher:

The Ingush regiment pounced upon the German "Iron Division" like an avalanche. It was immediately supported by the Chechen regiment. The Russian history, including the history of our Preobrazhensky regiment, does not know a single instance of a horse cavalry attacking an enemy force armed with heavy artillery: 4.5 thousand killed, 3.5 thousand taken prisoner, 2.5 thousand wounded. Less than in an hour and a half the "Iron Division" ceased to exist, the division that had aroused fear in the best armies of our allies. On behalf of me, the royal court and the whole of the Russian army send our best regards to fathers, mothers, sisters, wives and brides of those brave sons of the Caucasus whose heroism paved the way for the destruction of German hordes. Russia bows low to the heroes and will never forget them. I extend my fraternal greetings, Nicholas II, August 25, 1915.

In 1994–1996 Ingush volunteers fought alongside Chechens in the First Chechen War. Aside from a few incidents (including the killings of Ingush civilians by Russian soldiers), Ingushetia was largely kept out of the war by a determined policy of non-violence pursued by President Ruslan Aushev.

This changed after the beginning of the Second Chechen War, and especially since Murat Zyazikov became the second Russian appointed president of Ingushetia in 2002. The first major rebel attack of the conflict, in which a military convoy was destroyed occurred in May 2000 and caused the deaths of 19 soldiers. In the June 2004 Nazran raid, Chechen and Ingush rebels attacked government buildings and military bases across Ingushetia, resulting in the deaths of at least 90 Ingush people and an unknown number of Russian troops. Among them the Republic's acting interior minister Abukar Kostoyev, his deputy Zyaudin Kotiyev. In response to a sharp escalation in attacks by insurgents since the summer of 2007, Moscow sent in an additional 25,000 MVD and FSB troops, tripling the number of special forces in Ingushetia.

=== Resistance ===
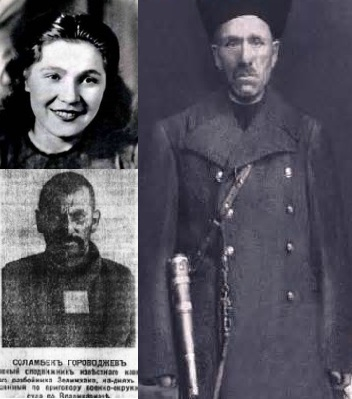
Famous Ingush rebels. Top left: Ingush sniper Laisat Baisarova. Lower left: Sulumbek of Sagopshi. Right: Akhmed Khuchbarov.

- 1800s–1860s: Insurgency against Russian conquest.
- 1860s–1890s: Raids of Ingush abreks on the Georgian Military Highway and Mozdok.
- 1890s–1917: Insurgency of Ingush resistance under Chechen abrek Zelimkhan Gushmazukaev and Ingush abrek Sulumbek of Sagopshi, execution of Russian viceroy to Ingushetia colonel Mitnik by Ingush resistance fighter Buzurtanov.
- 1917–1920s: Insurgency of Ingush resistance fighters against combined Russian White Guards, Cossacks, Ossetians, and general Denikin forces.
- 1920s–1930s: Insurgency of Ingush people against Communists, executions of Communist leader of Ingushetia Chernoglaz by Ingush rebel Uzhakhov. Execution of Communist party leader of Ingushetia Ivanov by Ingush rebels.
- 1992: Ossetian-Ingush conflict. In combat operations Ingush rebels capture armor which was later transferred to Chechens or given back to the Russian army after the conflict ended.
- 1994: Nazran. Ingush civilians stop Russian army, flip armor, burn military trucks which were on the march to Chechnya in Russian-Chechen war. First Russian casualties reported from hands of Ingush rebels.
- 1994–1996: Ingush rebels defend Grozny and participate in combat operations on Chechen side.
- 1999–2006: Ingush rebels join Chechen rebels, the independence war turns into Jihad.
- 13 July 2001: Ingush people protest "defiling and desecration" of historical Christian Ingush church Tkhaba-Yerdy after Russian troops made the church into a public toilet. Though Ingush are Muslims they highly respect their Christian past.
- 15 September 2003: Ingush rebels use bomb truck and attack FSB headquarters in Maghas. Several dozens of Russian FSB officers were killed including the senior officer overseeing the FSB in Chechen republic. The several story HQ building is severely damaged.
- 6 April 2004: Ingush rebels attack Russian appointed president of Ingushetia Murat Zyazikov. He was wounded when a car bomb was rammed into his motorcade.
- 22 June 2004: Chechen and Ingush rebels raid on Russian troops in Ingushetia. Hundreds of Russian troops killed.
- 10 July 2006: In the night, Chechen politician and leader of the militants Shamil Basayev and four other militants were killed in the village of the Ekazhevo during a truck explosion.
- 31 August 2008: Execution of Magomed Yevloyev Ingush dissident, journalist, lawyer, businessman, and the owner of the news website Ingushetiya.ru, known for being highly critical of Russian regime in Ingushetia. He was shot in the temple. Awarded posthumously, and his name is engraved in stone on the monuments at the Journalists' Memorials in Bayeux, France and Washington D.C., the United States.
- 30 September 2008: A suicide bomber attacked the motorcade of Ruslan Meiriyev, Ingushetia's top police official.
- 10 June 2009: Snipers killed Aza Gazgireyeva, deputy chief justice of the regional Supreme Court, as she dropped her children off at school. Russian news agencies also cited investigators as saying she was likely killed for her role in investigating the 2004 attack on Ingush police forces by Chechen fighters.
- 13 June 2009: Two gunmen sprayed former deputy prime minister Bashir Aushev with automatic-weapon fire as he got out of his car at the gate outside his home in the region's main city, Nazran.
- 22 June 2009: Russian appointed president of Ingushetia Yunus-Bek Yevkurov was badly hurt when a suicide bomber detonated a car packed with explosives as the president's convoy drove past. The attack killed three bodyguards.
- 12 August 2009: Gunmen killed construction minister Ruslan Amerkhanov in his office in the Ingush capital, Magas.
- 17 August 2009: A suicide bomber killed 21 Ingush police officers and unknown numbers of Russian Internal Ministry troops which were stationed in Nazran, after he drove a truck full of explosives into a MVD police base.
- 25 October 2009: Execution of Maksharip Aushev, an Ingush businessman, dissident, and a vocal critic of Russian regime policies in Ingushetia. His body had over 60 bullet holes. Awarded posthumously by the U.S. Department of State in 2009.
- 2 March 2010: Another militant was killed in the village of the Ekazhevo, his name is Said Buryatsky, but his real one is Aleksandr Aleksandrovich Tikhomirov, although he was born in the Republic of Buryatia.
- 5 April 2010: A suicide bomber injured three police officers in the town of Karabulak. Two officers died at the hospital as a result of their injuries. While investigators arrived on scene, another car bomb was set off by remote. Nobody was hurt in the second blast.
- 24 January 2011: A suicide bomber, Magomed Yevloyev (same first and last name as the slain Ingush opposition journalist Magomed Yevloyev), killed 37 people at Domodedovo airport, Moscow, Russia.
- 2012: Ingush rebels participate in the war against Bashar al-Assad, Iranian, and Russian advisors in Syria, which is largely viewed by Ingush rebels as a war against Russia and the Iranian-speaking Ossetians. The rebel Ingush commanders are veterans of Ossetian-Ingush conflict, wars in Chechnya, Daud Khalukhayev from the Ingush village of Palanazh (Katsa), and a descendant of Ingush deportee of 1860s Syrian-born Walid Didigov.
- 6 June 2013: Accusation of former Ingush rebel leader Ali "Maghas" Taziev in Rostov-On-Don regional Russian court, who was captured after he voluntarily turned himself in on 9 June 2010 to Russian forces in Ingushetia under an agreement that the Russians would liberate his relatives held hostage in one of the Russian military bases.
- 27 August 2013: Execution of the head of security of Ingushetia Akhmet Kotiev and his bodyguard by Ingush rebels. Kotiev was actively involved in the assassination of Magomed Yevloyev.
- 10 December 2013: Ingush opposition leader Magomed Khazbiev, who was a close friend of assassinated Magomed Yevloyev, attends Euromaidan in Ukraine and participates in anti-Russian campaign there, after which his parents were threatened and harassed in Russia. On his website he wrote: "the fact that Putin's slaves harass my parents does not make any sense [is in vain], if you [Russians] want me to stop you have to kill me like Magomed Yevloyev and Makhsharip Aushev".
- 2 February 2014: Russian FSB officially claimed that in December 2013 four North Caucasian instructors operated in Ukraine, and prepared Ukrainians for "street battles against Russian interests".
- 20 April 2014: Famous Ingush human rights defender Ibragim Lyanov stated that Ingushetia wants to separate from Russia and become an independent state, using the example of the Crimean separation from Ukraine.
- 24 May 2014: Ingush rebel leader Arthur Getagazhev, four rebels, and two civilians were killed in action in the village of Sagopshi by Russian forces.
- 2 July 2014: After several months of denial, the pro-Russian president of Ingushetia finally recognizes that there are Ingush people fighting in Ukraine on "both sides".
- 2 July 2014: Ingush rebels attack Russian armored military convoy killing one and wounding seven soldiers.
- 6 July 2014: Russian special forces prepared an ambush near the morgue in Nazran hospital where the body of Arthur Getagazhev was located. The intelligence reported that Ingush rebels will try to recover the body of the slain leader. The intelligence was correct. Radio Free Europe (section specializing in the Caucasus), reports that in the middle of the day two Ingush rebels attacked the ambush, according to unofficial source two rebels killed seven and wounded four Russian FSB and spetsnaz officers in less than forty seconds, after which the rebels left the scene unharmed. The source in Ingush police who wanted to stay anonymous said that exact number of killed are known only by the FSB but nobody would dare to declare it officially. According to pro-Kremlin LifeNews, released video of the attack lasted less than 19 seconds.
- 17 January 2015: Maghas. Rise of anti-Western sentiments. Over 20,000 Ingush citizens protest against Europe.
- 28 February 2015: Russian opposition leader Nemtsov's death linked to Ingushetia by Russian police.
- 26 March 2019: Thousands of people in Ingushetia have protested against a controversial border deal with neighboring Chechnya, denouncing land swaps under the agreement and calling for Ingushetia head Yunus-Bek Yevkurov to step down.
- 25 June 2019: Yunus-Bek Yevkurov, has announced his resignation after almost 11 years in the position. De facto Ingushetia has no active leader. Civil protests continue, Ingush people are boycotting the Russian appointed elections.
- 2 March 2024: Clashes between militants and the Russian police began in Ingushetia.

== Politics ==
Up until the dissolution of the Soviet state, Ingushetia was part of the Chechen-Ingush ASSR of the Russian Soviet Socialist Republic. In the late 1920s – early 1930s the Soviet officials were eager to enforce the Chechen-Ingush merger as an "objective" and "natural" process. The Soviet linguist Nikolay Yakovlev, who was a supporter of the merger, suggested that an inclusive name of Vainakh ("our people") had to be used for both the Chechens and Ingush. According to his views, the rapid urbanization and rapprochement of the Chechens and Ingush within one and the same republic might encourage the formation of a common culture and language and the establishment of a unified Vainakh people.

During the late '80s, together with the separatist tendencies across the Soviet Union, the Second Congress of the Ingush People was held in Grozny on 9–10 September 1989. The gathering was directed at the top leadership of the Soviet Union, and included a request to "restore the Ingush people's autonomy within their historical borders, the Ingush Autonomous Soviet Socialist Republic with a capital in the right-bank part of the city of Ordzhonikidze". The Ingush Republic was to be organized out of six traditional Ingush districts (including the contested Prigorodny District). The rise of the Russian Federation - and the 1991 Chechen Revolution - gave the Ingushetians the independence they vowed for and in 1992 the remainder of Checheno-Ingushetia became thus the Republic of Ingushetia. During the 1990s, Ingushetia was ruled by its elected president Ruslan Aushev, a former Soviet general and hero of the war in Afghanistan.

The head of government and the highest executive post in Ingushetia is the Head, elected by representatives of the Parliament of Ingushetia.

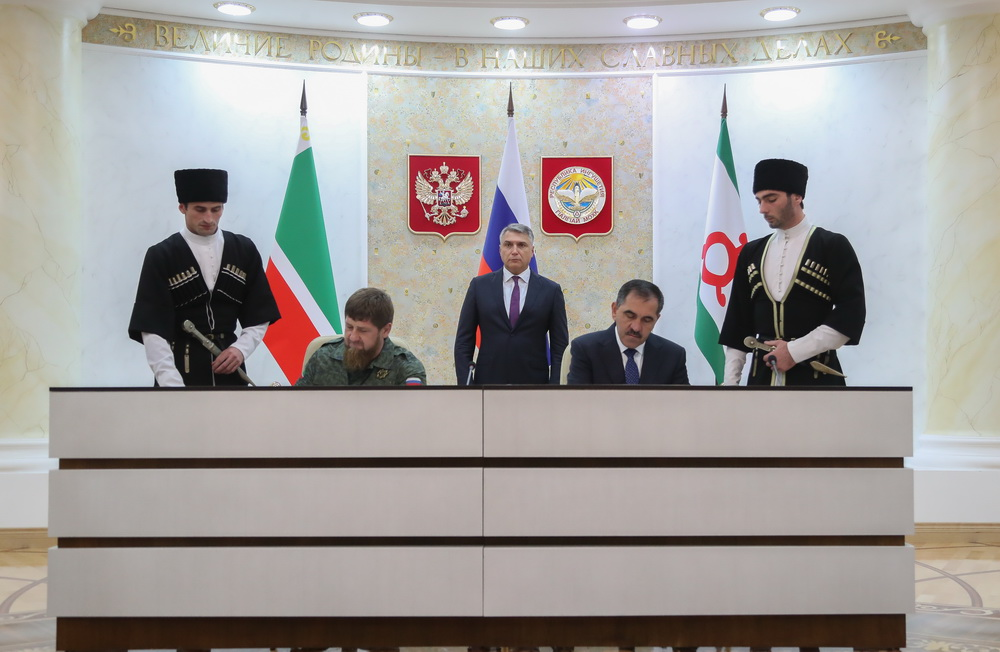
Ingushetia's President Yunus-bek Yevkurov and Chechen leader Ramzan Kadyrov in September 2018

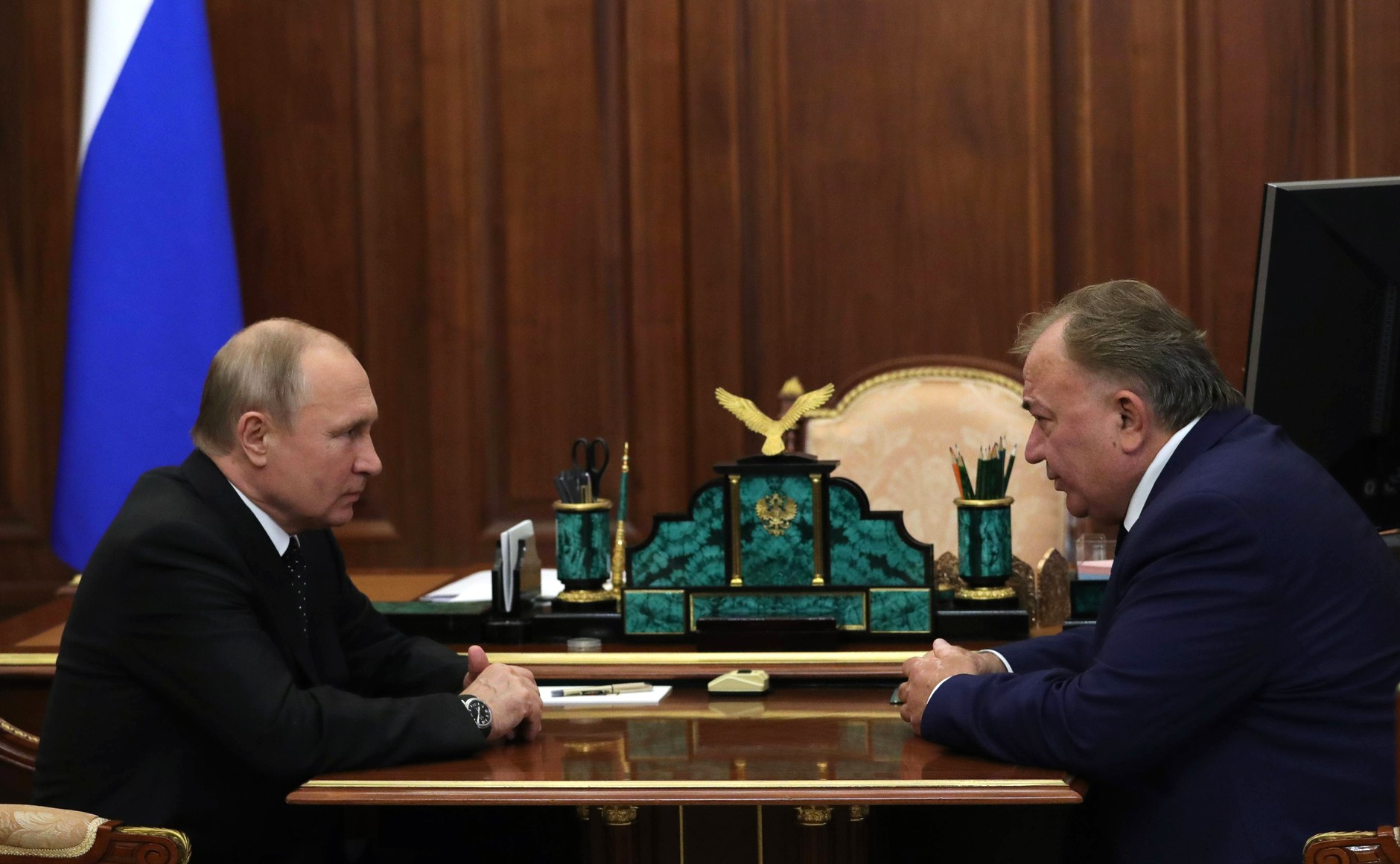
Ingushetia's President Mahmud-Ali Kalimatov (right) and Russian President Vladimir Putin in June 2019

Recent heads:

- Ruslan Aushev: 10 November 1992 (Head of the Republic until 7 March 1993) – 28 December 2001
- Akhmed Malsagov (interim): 28 December 2001 – 23 May 2002
- Murat Zyazikov: 23 May 2002 – 30 October 2008
- Yunus-Bek Yevkurov: 30 October 2008 – 26 June 2019
- Makhmud-Ali Kalimatov: 26 June 2019–present

Recent Chairmen of the Government:

- Ruslan Tatiev: 24 March 1993 – 5 July 1993
- Tamerlan Didigov: 5 July 1993 – 21 March 1994
- Mukharbek Didigov: 21 March 1994 – 9 December 1996
- Belan Khamchiev: 10 December 1996 – 3 August 1998
- Magomed-Bashir Darsigov: 3 August 1998 – 24 November 1999
- Akhmed Malsagov: 24 November 1999 – 14 June 2002
- Viktor Aleksentsev: 26 August 2002 – 3 June 2003
- Timur Mogushkov: 3 June 2003 – 30 June 2005
- Ibragim Malsagov: 30 June 2005 – 13 March 2008
- Kharun Dzeytov: 14 March 2008 – 12 November 2008
- Rashid Gaysanov: 13 November 2008 – 5 October 2009
- Aleksey Vorobyov: 5 October 2009 – 10 March 2010
- Musa Chiliev: 21 March 2011 – 19 September 2013
- Abubakar Malsagov: 19 September 2013 – 18 November 2016
- Ruslan Gagiev: 18 November 2016 – 9 September 2018
- Zyalimkhan Yevloev: 9 September 2018 – 8 September 2019
- Konstantin Surikov: 9 September 2019 – 27 January 2020
- Vladimir Slastenin: 26 March 2020–present

The parliament of the Republic is the People's Assembly, composed of 34 deputies elected for a four-year term. The People's Assembly is headed by the Chairman. As of 2022, the Chairman of the People's Assembly is Vladimir Slastenin.

The Constitution of Ingushetia was adopted on 27 February 1994.

Ingushetia is a member of the Unrepresented Nations and Peoples Organization.

The capital was moved from Nazran to Magas in December 2002.

The most recent election was held in 2013.

== Administrative divisions ==
Administrative divisions of Ingushetia.

- Cities under the republic's jurisdiction (as of 2016):
  - Magas (Магас) (capital)
  - Nazran (Назрань)
  - Malgobek (Малгобек)
  - Karabulak (Карабулак)
  - Sunzha (Сунжа)
- Districts:
  - Dzheyrakhsky (Джейрахский)
  - Sunzhensky (Сунженский)
  - Nazranovsky (Назрановский)
  - Malgobeksky (Малгобекский)

== Demographics ==
Map of Ingushetia and Chechnya in geographical context.

Population: 509,541 (2021 census); 412,529 (2010 census); 467,294 (2002 census).

Historical population
| Year | Pop. | ±% |
|---|---|---|
| 2002 | 467,294 | — |
| 2010 | 412,529 | −11.7% |
| 2021 | 509,541 | +23.5% |
| 2025 | 534,219 | +4.8% |
Source: Census data, estimate

=== Vital statistics ===
Source: Russian Federal State Statistics Service

| | Average population (× 1000) | Live births | Deaths | Natural change | Crude birth rate (per 1000) | Crude death rate (per 1000) | Natural change (per 1000) | Total fertility rate |
|---|---|---|---|---|---|---|---|---|
| 1995 | | 6,889 | 1,867 | 5,022 | 25.3 | 6.8 | 18.4 | |
| 1996 | | 5,980 | 1,958 | 4,022 | 20.9 | 6.8 | 14.0 | |
| 1997 | | 6,055 | 1,957 | 4,098 | 20.6 | 6.7 | 14.0 | |
| 1998 | | 5,929 | 2,064 | 3,865 | 19.8 | 6.9 | 12.9 | |
| 1999 | | 6,624 | 1,953 | 4,671 | 20.6 | 6.1 | 14.6 | |
| 2000 | | 8,463 | 2,117 | 6,346 | 21.5 | 5.4 | 16.2 | |
| 2001 | | 8,753 | 1,875 | 6,878 | 19.4 | 4.2 | 15.3 | |
| 2002 | | 7,578 | 1,874 | 5,704 | 16.4 | 4.1 | 12.4 | |
| 2003 | | 7,059 | 1,785 | 5,274 | 15.3 | 3.9 | 11.4 | |
| 2004 | | 6,794 | 1,751 | 5,043 | 15.0 | 3.9 | 11.1 | |
| 2005 | | 6,777 | 1,821 | 4,956 | 15.2 | 4.1 | 11.1 | |
| 2006 | | 7,391 | 1,830 | 5,561 | 16.9 | 4.2 | 12.7 | |
| 2007 | | 8,284 | 1,625 | 6,659 | 19.3 | 3.8 | 15.5 | |
| 2008 | | 9,215 | 1,561 | 7,654 | 21.8 | 3.7 | 18.1 | |
| 2009 | | 9,572 | 1,877 | 7,695 | 22.9 | 4.5 | 18.4 | 2.51 |
| 2010 | | 11,178 | 1,857 | 9,321 | 27.1 | 4.5 | 22.6 | 2.99 |
| 2011 | 414 | 11,408 | 1,705 | 9,703 | 27.0 | 4.0 | 23.0 | 2.94 |
| 2012 | 430 | 9,350 | 1,595 | 7,755 | 21.4 | 3.7 | 17.7 | 2.27 |
| 2013 | 442 | 9,498 | 1,568 | 7,930 | 21.2 | 3.5 | 17.7 | 2.23 |
| 2014 | 453 | 9,858 | 1,586 | 8,272 | 21.5 | 3.5 | 18.0 | 2.28 |
| 2015 | 463 | 8,647 | 1,557 | 7,090 | 18.5 | 3.3 | 15.2 | 1.97 |
| 2016 | 472 | 7,750 | 1,555 | 6,195 | 16.3 | 3.3 | 13.0 | 1.75 |
| 2017 | 480 | 7,890 | 1,554 | 6,336 | 16.3 | 3.2 | 13.1 | 1.77 |
| 2018 | 488 | 8,048 | 1,548 | 6,500 | 16.3 | 3.1 | 13.2 | 1.79 |
| 2019 | 497 | 8,252 | 1,529 | 6,723 | 16.4 | 3.0 | 13.4 | 1.83 |
| 2020 | 507 | 8,463 | 1,891 | 6,572 | 16.6 | 3.7 | 12.9 | 1.85 |
| 2021 | 513 | 8,480 | 2,194 | 6,286 | 16.3 | 4.2 | 12.1 | 1.87 |
| 2022 | | 7,912 | 1,727 | 6,185 | 15.0 | 3.3 | 11.7 | 1.83 |
| 2023 | | 7,844 | 1,705 | 6,139 | 15.0 | 3.3 | 11.7 | 1.81 |
| 2024 | | 7,962 | 1,833 | 6,129 | 15.0 | 3.5 | 11.5 | 1.81 |
| 2025 | | | | | | | | 1.72 |

Note: Total fertility rate 2009, 2010, 2011 source:

=== Life expectancy ===
Ingushetia has a life expectancy noticeably higher than that of any other federal subjects of the Russian Federation. In this way, Ingushetia is a Russian "blue zone". In the pre-pandemic 2019, life expectancy in Ingushetia was the same as in Switzerland, according to an estimate by the WHO, — 83.4 years.

| | 2019 | 2021 |
|---|---|---|
| Average: | 83.4 years | 80.5 years |
| Male: | 80.0 years | 77.3 years |
| Female: | 86.3 years | 83.3 years |

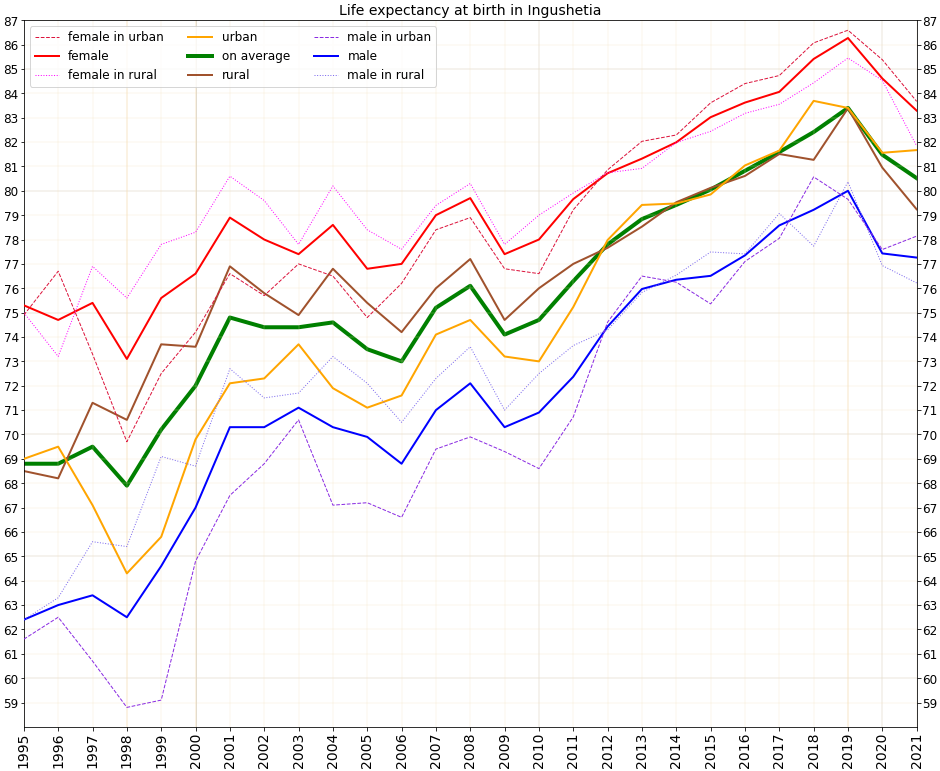
Life expectancy at birth in Ingushetia

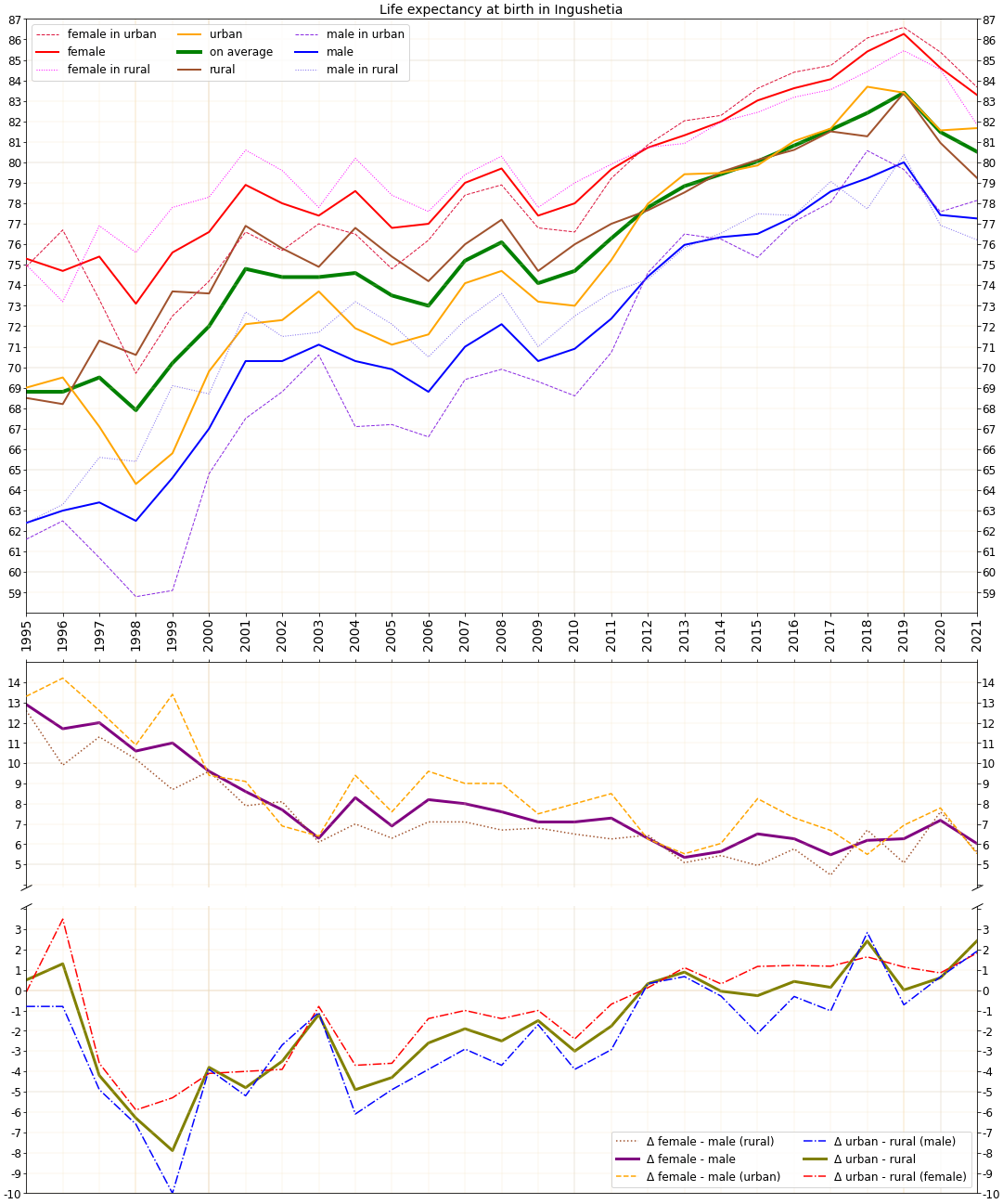
Life expectancy with calculated differences

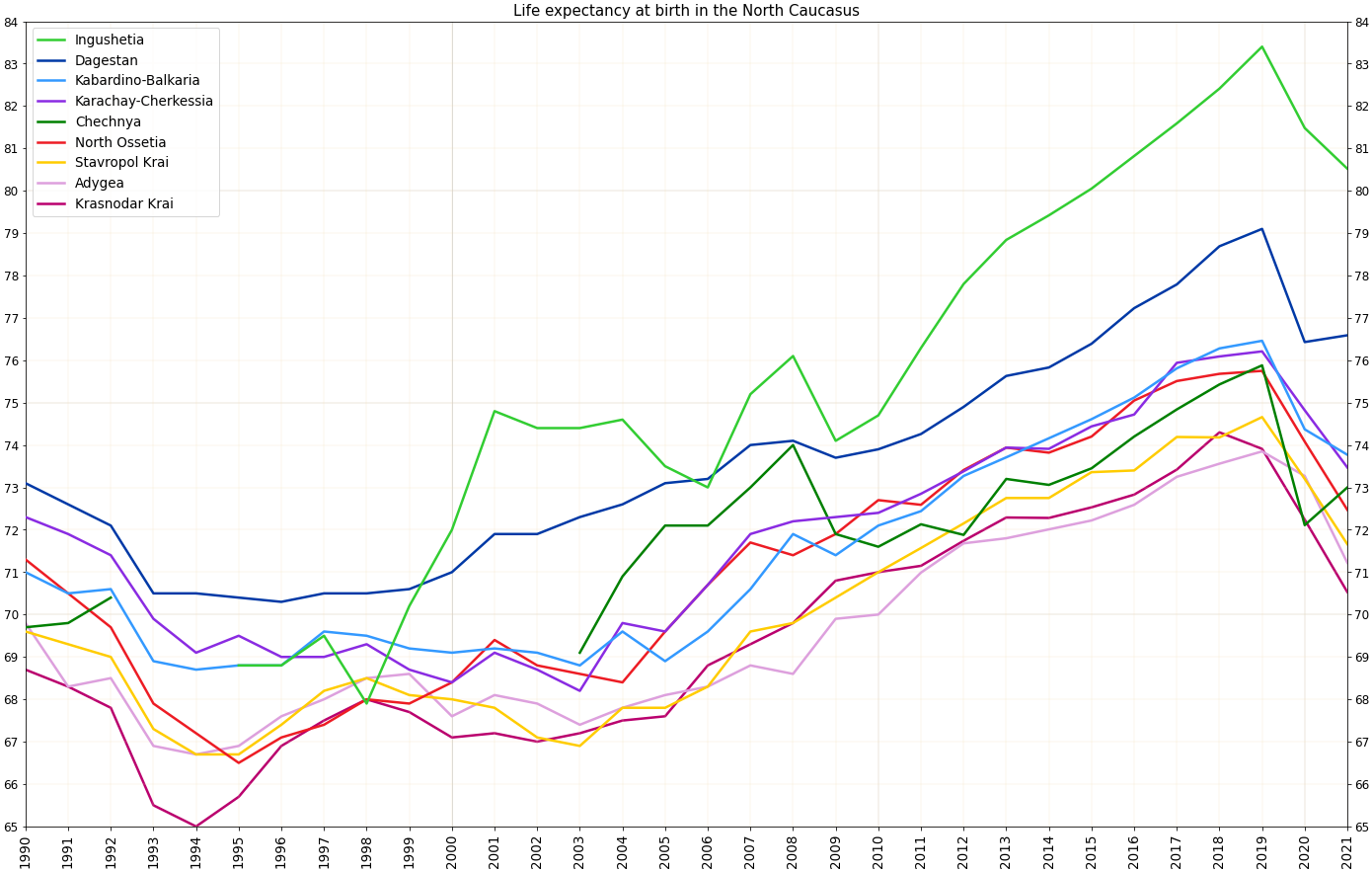
Life expectancy in Ingushetia in comparison with other regions of the North Caucasus

Interactive chart of comparison of male and female life expectancy for 2021. Open the original svg-file in a separate window and hover over a bubble to highlight it.

Analogous interactive chart of comparison of urban and rural life expectancy.
Original interactive file.

=== Ethnic groups ===
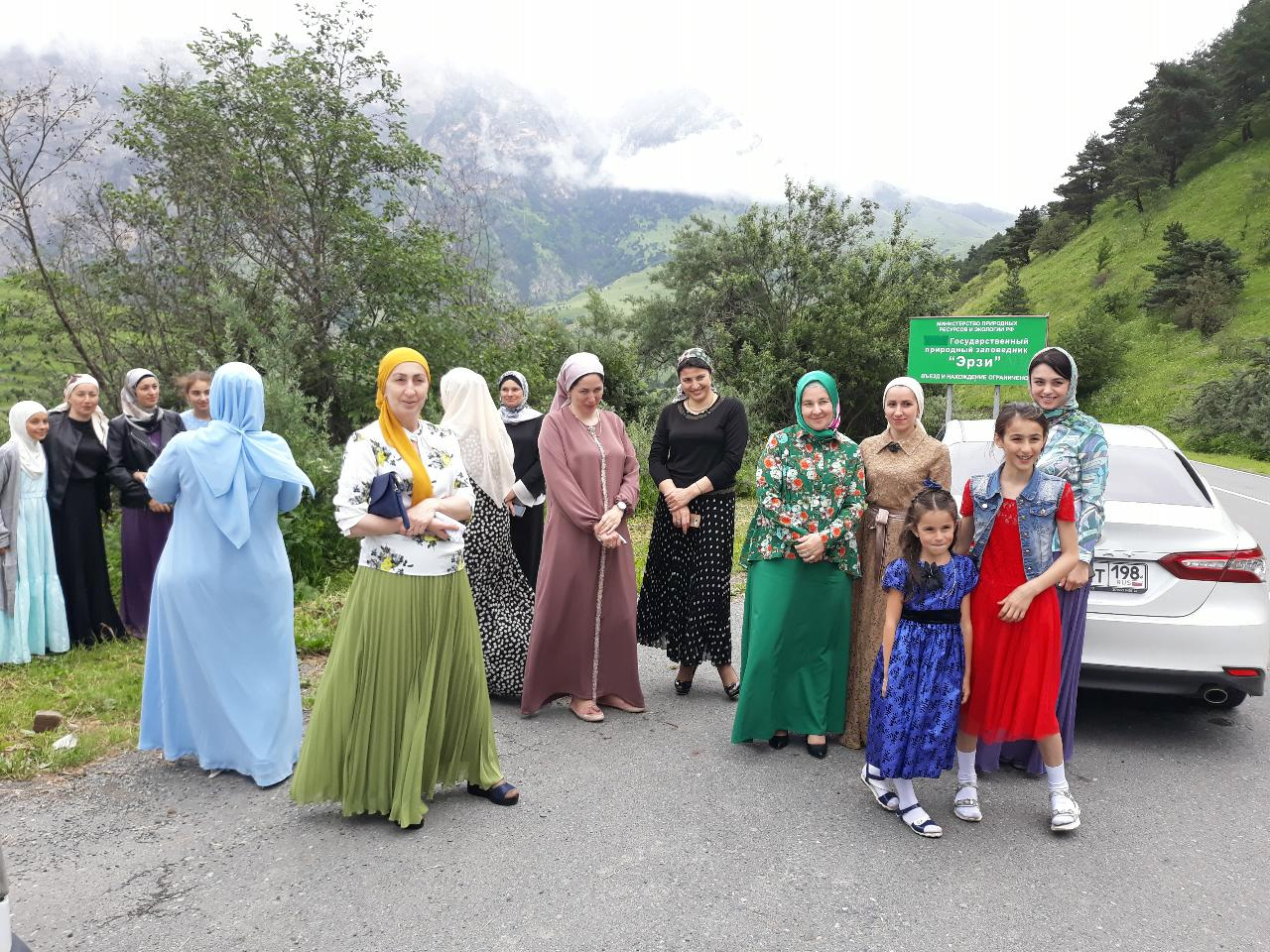
The Ingush people

According to the 2021 Russian census, ethnic Ingush make up 96.4% of the republic's population. The Ingush, a nationality group indigenous to the Caucasus, mostly inhabit Ingushetia. They refer to themselves as Ghalghaj (from Ingush: Ghala ('fortress' or 'town') and ghaj ('inhabitants' or 'citizens'). The Ingush speak the Ingush language, which has a very high degree of mutual intelligibility with neighboring Chechen.

Other groups include Chechens (2.5%), Russians (0.7%), and a host of smaller groups, each accounting for less than 0.5% of the total population.

| Ethnic group | 1926 Census | | 1939 Census | | 1959 Census | | 1970 Census | | 1979 Census | | 1989 Census | | 2002 Census | | 2010 Census | | 2021 Census^{1} | |
| Ethnic group | Number | % | Number | % | Number | % | Number | % | Number | % | Number | % | Number | % | Number | % | Number | % |
|---|---|---|---|---|---|---|---|---|---|---|---|---|---|---|---|---|---|---|
| Ingush | 47,280 | 61.6% | 79,462 | 58.0% | 44,634 | 40.6% | 99,060 | 66.0% | 113,889 | 74.2% | 138,626 | 74.5% | 361,057 | 77.3% | 385,537 | 94.1% | 473,440 | 96.4% |
| Chechens | 2,553 | 3.3% | 7,746 | 5.7% | 5,643 | 5.1% | 8,724 | 5.8% | 9,182 | 6.0% | 19,195 | 10.3% | 95,403 | 20.4% | 18,765 | 4.6% | 12,240 | 2.5% |
| Russians | 24,185 | 31.5% | 43,389 | 31.7% | 51,549 | 46.9% | 37,258 | 24.8% | 26,965 | 17.6% | 24,641 | 13.2% | 5,559 | 1.2% | 3,321 | 0.8% | 3,294 | 0.7% |
| Ukrainians | 1,501 | 2.0% | 1,921 | 1.4% | 1,763 | 1.6% | 1,068 | 0.7% | 687 | 0.4% | 753 | 0.4% | 189 | 0.0% | 91 | 0.0% | 34 | 0.0% |
| Others | 1,215 | 1.6% | 4,549 | 3.3% | 6,438 | 5.9% | 3,978 | 2.7% | 2,852 | 1.9% | 2,781 | 1.5% | 5,086 | 1.1% | 1,918 | 0.5% | 2,129 | 0.4% |
^{1} 18,404people were registered from administrative databases, and could not declare an ethnicity. It is estimated that the proportion of ethnicities in this group is the same as that of the declared group.

=== Religion ===
Religion in Ingushetia (2010)
| Islam | 96% |
| Christianity | 2% |
| Atheism | 1% |
| Not stated | 1% |

Ingushetia is one of the most religious regions of Russia. The Ingush people predominantly follow the Shafi'i Madhhab of Sunni Islam with strong influence from Sufism, which is often associated with one of two traditional Sufi orders: the Sufi tariqa Naqshbandi, represented in Ingushetia by the brotherhood of Deni Arsanov, and the tariqa Qadiriyyah, associated with Kunta-Haji Kishiev.

=== Education ===
Ingush State University, the first institute of higher education in the history of Ingushetia, was founded in 1994 in Ordzhonikidzevskaya.

== Geography ==
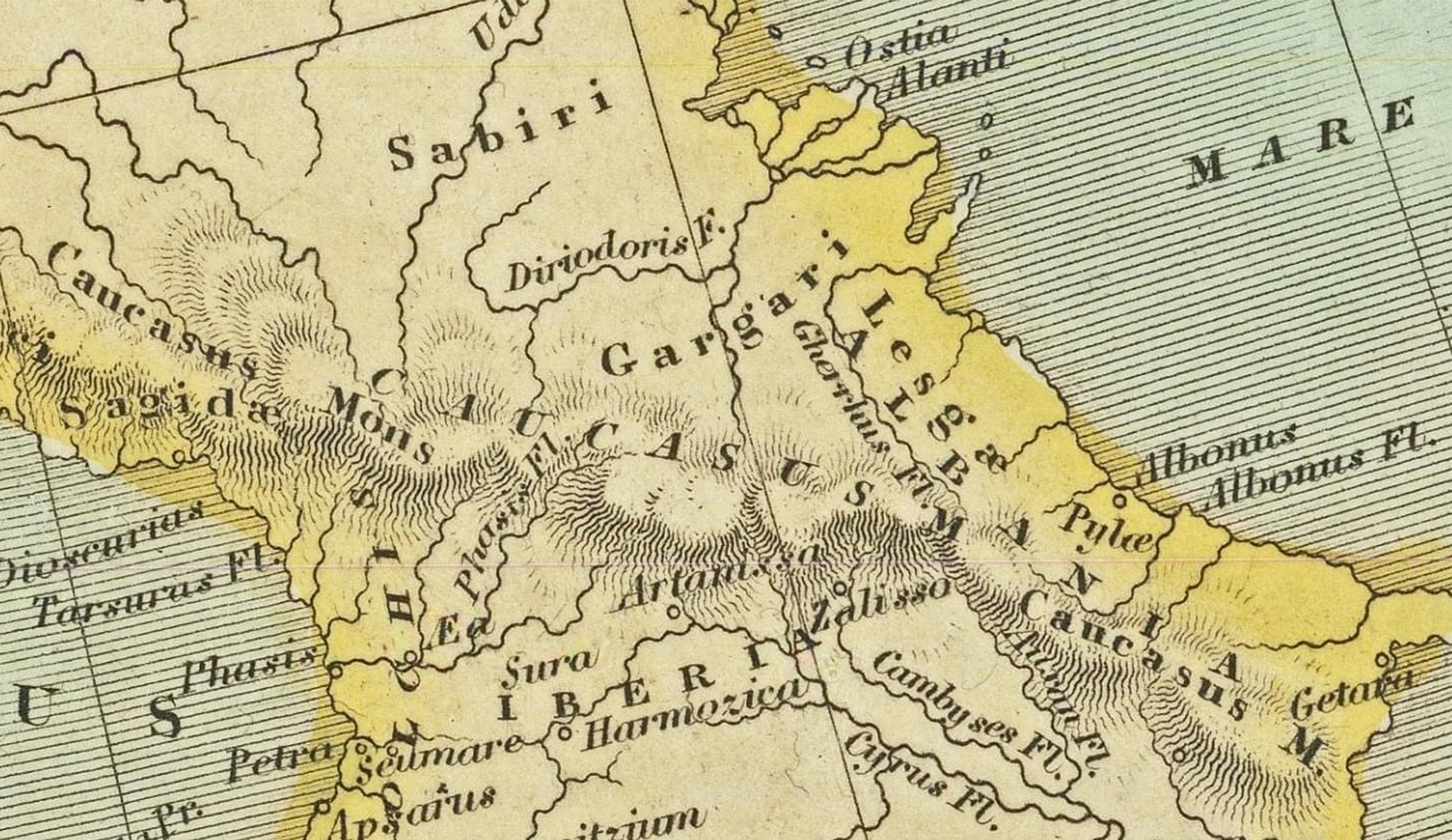
Topographic map of the ancient Caucasus. Gargarea is an ancestral land of modern Ingush is located on the center right of the map.

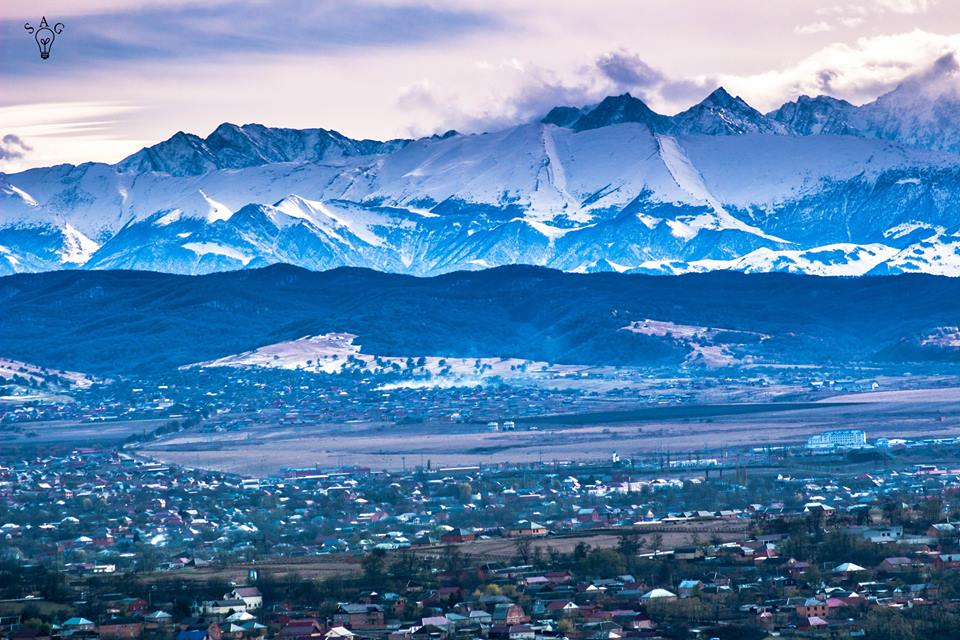
Mountains in the Nazran Region

Ingushetia is situated on the northern slopes of the Caucasus. Its area is reported by various sources as either 2,000 square kilometers (770 sq mi), 3,100 square kilometers (1,200 sq mi), or 3,600 square kilometers (1,400 sq mi); the difference in reporting is mainly due to the inclusion or exclusion of parts of Sunzhensky District. The republic borders North Ossetia–Alania (W/NW/N), Chechnya (NE/E/SE), and the country of Georgia (Mtskheta-Mtianeti) (S/SW). The highest point is Mt Shanloam (4453 m).

The region is very mountainous and has a complex system of ridges, from north to south these are:

Forest Ridge, the lowest one that is in the Caucasus proper, reaches up to 1,540 metres (5,050 ft) inside Ingushetia and up to 2,100 metres (6,900 ft) in nearby Chechnya.

Pasture Ridge, the second one, up to 2,400 metres (7,900 ft) tall.

Rocky Ridge, the third one, up to 3,100 metres (10,200 ft) tall.

Lateral Ridge, the penultimate one, up to 4,453 metres (14,610 ft) tall at the highest point of Ingushetia, Shanloam.

And the Main Caucasus Ridge, only a small bit of it is in Ingushetia, reaching around 4,000 metres (13,000 ft) too.

Overall they form a 150-kilometer (93 mi) band of mountains through the entire republic.

=== Rivers ===
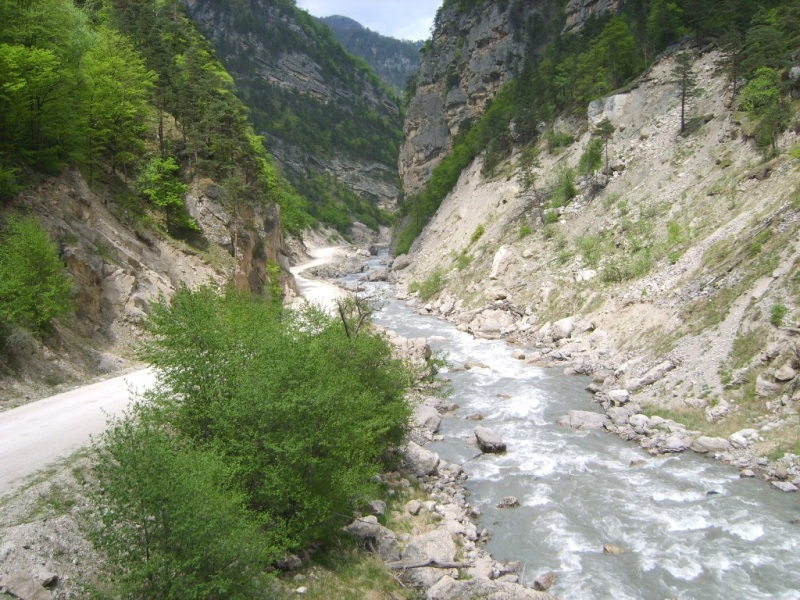
Assin Valley

Major rivers include the Tirk, Es-khi, and Solzha rivers.

=== Natural resources ===
Ingushetia is rich in marble, timber, dolomite, plaster, limestone, gravel, granite, clay, thermal medical water, rare metals, mineral water, oil (over 60 billion tons), and natural gas reserves.

=== Climate ===
Ingushetia's climate is mostly continental.

- Average January temperature: −10 °C (14 °F)
- Average July temperature: 21 °C (70 °F)
- Average annual precipitation: 450–650 mm (18–26 in)
- Average annual temperature: +10 °C (50 °F)

== Economy ==
There are some natural resources in Ingushetia: mineral water in Achaluki, oil and natural gas in Malgobek, forests in Dzheirakh, metals in Galashke. The local government is considering the development of tourism; however, this is problematic due to the uneasy situation in the republic itself and the proximity of some conflict zones. However, Ingushetia continues to remain as one of Russia's poorest republics, largely due to the ongoing conflict, corruption and civil disorders. Unemployment is estimated to be around 53%, and growing poverty is a major issue.

== Culture ==
The 1995 spy novel Our Game by British writer John le Carré is centered on the protagonist's pursuit of his friend to Ingushetia and his eventual support of the Ingushetia uprising against Russia.

== Notable people ==
- Yunus-bek Yevkurov, deputy Defense Minister of the Russian Federation.
- Musa Evloev, Greco-Roman wrestler. He is a two-time world champion, Olympic champion, and two-time national champion,
- Movsar Evloev, #1 Ranked UFC Featherweight.
- Idris Bazorkin, writer.
- Ruslan Aushev, infantry general, Hero of the Soviet Union, first president of Ingushetia.
- Rakhim Chakkhiev, boxer.
- Issa Kodzoev, writer.
- Issa Kostoyev, policeman who captured the serial killer Andrei Chikatilo.
- Nazyr Mankiev, wrestler.
- Murad Ozdoev, WWII fighter pilot and recipient of the title Hero of the Russian Federation.
- Sulom-Beck Oskanov, Air Force general.
- Islam Timurziev, boxer.

== See also ==
- Ingush towers
- Music in Ingushetia

== Sources ==
=== Documents ===
- Конституционный закон №57-РЗ от 7 декабря 2010 г. «О государственном гимне Республики Ингушетия», в ред. Конституционного закона №2-РЗП от 4 июля 2011 г «О внесении изменений в некоторые законодательные акты Республики Ингушетия в связи с принятием Закона Республики Ингушетия от 11 октября 2010 года No. 3-РЗП "О поправке к Конституции"». Вступил в силу со дня официального опубликования. Опубликован: "Ингушетия", No.211–212, 18 декабря 2010 г. (Constitutional Law #57-RZ of 7 December 2010 On the State Anthem of the Republic of Ingushetia, as amended by the Constitutional Law #2-RZP of 4 July 2011 On Amending Various Legislative Acts of the Republic of Ingushetia Due to the Adoption of the Law of the Republic Ingushetia #3-RZP of 11 October 2010 "On the Amendment to the Constitution". Effective as of the day of the official publication.). (in Russian)
- 27 февраля 1994 г. «Конституция Республики Ингушетия», в ред. Закона №1-РЗП от 8 мая 2013 г. «О поправке к Конституции Республики Ингушетия». Опубликован: Сборник Конституций субъектов Федерации "Конституции Республик в составе Российской Федерации", выпуск 1, 1995. (February 27, 1994 Constitution of the Republic of Ingushetia, as amended by the Law #1-RZP of May 8, 2013 On the Amendment to the Constitution of the Republic of Ingushetia. ). (in Russian)
- Верховный Совет РСФСР. Закон от 4 июня 1992 г. «Об образовании Республики Ингушетия в составе РСФСР». (Supreme Soviet of the RSFSR. Law of 4 June 1992 On Establishing the Republic of Ingushetia Within the RSFSR. ). (in Russian)

=== Literature ===
- Albogachieva, Makka (2015). "Демаркация границ Ингушетии" [Demarcation of the borders of Ingushetia] (PDF). In Karpov, Yury (ed.). Горы и границы: Этнография посттрадиционных обществ [Mountains and Borders: An Ethnography of Post-Traditional Societies] (in Russian). Saint Petersburg: Kunstkamera. pp. 168–255. ISBN 978-5-88431-290-6.
- Gadzhiev, Magomed; Davudov, Omar; Shikhsaidov, Amri (1996). Gadzhiev, Magomed; Gamzatov, Gadzhi; Davudov, Omar; Osmanov, Ahmed; Osmanov, Magomed-Zagir; Shikhsaidov, Amri (eds.). История Дагестана с древнейших времен до конца XV в. [History of Dagestan from ancient times to the end of the 15th century] (PDF) (in Russian). Makhachkala: DSC of RAS. pp. 1–460.
- Gadzhiev, Magomed; Davudov, Omar; Kaymarazov, Gani; Osmanov, Ahmed; Ramazanov, Khidir; Shikhsaidov, Amri, eds. (2004). История Дагестана с древнейших времен до наших дней. Tom 1: История Дагестана с древнейших времен до XX века [History of Dagestan from ancient times to the present day. Vol. 1: History of Dagestan from ancient times to the 20th century] (PDF) (in Russian). Moscow: Nauka. pp. 1–627. ISBN 5-02-009852-3.
- "ИНГУШЕ́ТИЯ" [INGUSHÉTIA]. Great Russian Encyclopedia (in Russian).
- "Ingushetiya". Encyclopædia Britannica.
- Karpeev, Igor (2000). Dolmatov, Vladimir (ed.). "Наиб Ахбердилав" [Nail Akhberdilav]. Rodina (in Russian). No. 1/2. Moscow: FGBU Red. "Rossiyskaya Gazeta". pp. 90–93.
- Kodzoev, Nurdin (2002a). "Глава 4. Ингушетия в XV—XVIII вв." [Chapter 5. Ingushetia in the 15–18th centuries]. История ингушского народа [History of the Ingush people] (in Russian). Archived from the original on 11 May 2012.
- Kodzoev, Nurdin (2002b). "Глава 5. Ингушетия в XIX в." [Chapter 5. Ingushetia in the 19th century]. История ингушского народа [History of the Ingush people] (in Russian). Archived from the original on 23 July 2019.
- Krupnov, Evgeny (1939). "К истории Ингушии" [To the history of Ingushiya]. Journal of Ancient History (in Russian). 2 (7). Moscow: Nauka: 77–90.
- Latham-Sprinkle, John (2022). "The Alan Capital *Magas: A Preliminary Identification of Its Location". Bulletin of the School of Oriental and African Studies, University of London. 85 (1): 1–20. doi:10.1017/S0041977X22000453. hdl:1854/LU-8681124. S2CID 249556131.
- Martirosian, Georgi (1928). Нагорная Ингушия [Upland Ingushiya] (in Russian). Vladikavkaz: Izd-vo "Serdalo". pp. 1–153.
- Martirosian, Georgi (1933). История Ингушии [History of Ingushiya] (in Russian). Ordzhonikidze: Izd-vo "Serdalo".
- Nichols, Johanna (1997). The Ingush (with notes on the Chechen). University of California, Berkeley. Archived from the original on 8 December 2006.
- Nichols, Johanna; Sprouse, Ronald L. (2004). Ghalghaai-Ingalsii, Ingalsii-Ghalghaai Lughat [Ingush-English and English-Ingush Dictionary] (in English and Ingush). London: RoutledgeCurzon. pp. 1–563. ISBN 9780415315951.
- Shnirelman, Victor (2006). Kalinin, Ilya (ed.). Быть Аланами: Интеллектуалы и политика на Северном Кавказе в XX веке [To be Alans: Intellectuals and Politics in the North Caucasus in the 20th Century] (in Russian). Moscow: NLR. pp. 1–691. ISBN 5-86793-406-3. ISSN 1813-6583.
- Tmenov, Vitaly; Kuznetsov, Vladimir; Gutnov, Felix; Totoev, Felix (1987). "Глава IX: Северная Осетия в XIV —XV вв." [Chapter 9: North Ossetia in the 14th-15th centuries]. In Dzugaeva, E. Kh.; et al. (eds.). История Северо-Осетинской АССР: С древнейших времен до наших дней [History of the North Ossetian Autonomous Soviet Socialist Republic: From ancient times to the present day] (in Russian). Vol. 1 (2nd ed.). Ordzhonikidze: Ir. pp. 133–150.
- Volkova, Nataliya (1973). Lavrov, Leonid (ed.). Этнонимы и племенные названия Северного Кавказа [Ethnonyms and tribal names of the North Caucasus] (in Russian). Moscow: Nauka. pp. 1–210.
