= Bashir Aushev =

Ingush politician (1947–2009)

- Башир Аушев
- Born: Bashir Magometovich Aushev; 1947
- Died: 13 June 2009 (aged 61–62); Nazran, Ingushetia, Russia

Bashir Magometovich Aushev (Russian: Башир Магометович Аушев; 1947 – 13 June 2009) was an Ingush politician who served as deputy Prime Minister of Ingushetia from 2002 to 2008.

== Career ==
Aushev served as Deputy Prime Minister under former Ingush President Murat Zyazikov. Zyazikov was a former Soviet KGB agent who was unpopular in Ingushetia because of his repressive policies. Aushev had been responsible for Ingustetia's law enforcement agencies under Zyazikov while in office.

Aushev resigned from office in October 2008, when Murat Zyazikov was removed from office by the Russian government and replaced by Yunus-bek Yevkurov. He reportedly did not work from October 2008, when he left office, to his death in June 2009.

== Assassination ==
Aushev was shot and killed outside of his home in Nazran, Ingushetia, on 13 June 2009. Two unidentified gunmen opened fire on Aushev as he was exiting his car at the gate leading to his home.

Aushev's assassination was part of a string of killings and attacks on officials throughout Ingushetia and other parts of the North Caucasus in June 2009. On 10 June 2009, the deputy chief justice in the Supreme Court of Ingushetia, Aza Gazgireeva, was shot and killed. Just nine days after Aushev's assassination, the President of Ingushetia, Yunus-bek Yevkurov, was severely wounded in a bomb attack on his motorcade on 22 June 2009.
