= 2013 Ingush Head election =

Indirect elections for the Head of the Republic of Ingushetia were held on 9 September 2013. Incumbent Head Yunus-Bek Yevkurov was re-elected for another 5 year term.

== Background ==
Since 1992, Ingushetia has been a Republic of the Russian Federation. It held direct presidential elections until 2004 when Russian Federation President Vladimir Putin abolished direct elections. He replaced them with indirect elections in which the People's Assembly elected a Head. However, amid growing anti-Putin protests in 2011-2012, President Dimitry Medvedev reintroduced them. However, when Putin returned to power, he signed a decree that abolished direct elections in Dagestan and Ingushetia, and some saw it as an attempt to keep unpopular leaders in power.

== Candidates ==
President Putin selected three candidates:

- Yunus-Bek Yevkurov, Head of Ingushetia since 2008.
- Magomed Tatriyev, deputy speaker of the parliament.
- Uruskhan Yevloyev, head of the Ingush branch of A Just Russia.

It was rumored that former, but highly controversial Head Murat Zyazikov may be a candidate.

== Results ==
On 9 September Yanus-Bek Yevkurov was declared the winner. He will serve as Head unless he loses the next election or is dismissed by the President of Russia.
