= Rashid Gaysanov =

Rashid Yakhyaevich Gaysanov
- Рашид Яхьяевич Гайсанов

Prime Minister of Ingushetia
- In office 13 November 2008 – 5 October 2009
- President: Yunus-bek Yevkurov

Personal details
- Born: 17 September 1972 (age 54) Gamurzievo, RSFSR, USSR
- Children: 4

Rashid Yakhyayevich Gaysanov (Russian: Рашид Яхьяевич Гайсанов; born 17 September 1972), last name is also spelled Gaisanov, is a Russian politician in the southern Republic of Ingushetia. He was as the prime minister of Ingushetia under Ingush President Yunus-bek Yevkurov. He was later appointed acting president of Ingushetia following an assassination attempt against Yevkurov in July 2009 and served until August of the same year.

Gaysanov's appointment as acting president was seen as an attempt by the Kremlin to halt potential political infighting. Both Gaysanov and former Ingush president Ruslan Aushev had reportedly shown interest in becoming acting presidents until Yevkurov returned to office. Gaysanov was directed by the President of Russia, Dmitry Medvedev, to exercise operational leadership of the republic.

Gaysanov pledged to continue all of Yevkurov's programs and policies during Yevkurov's recovery. The office returned to Yevkurov upon his recovery.
