= Yunus-bek Yevkurov =

Russian military officer and politician (born 1963)

- Юнус-Бек Евкуров
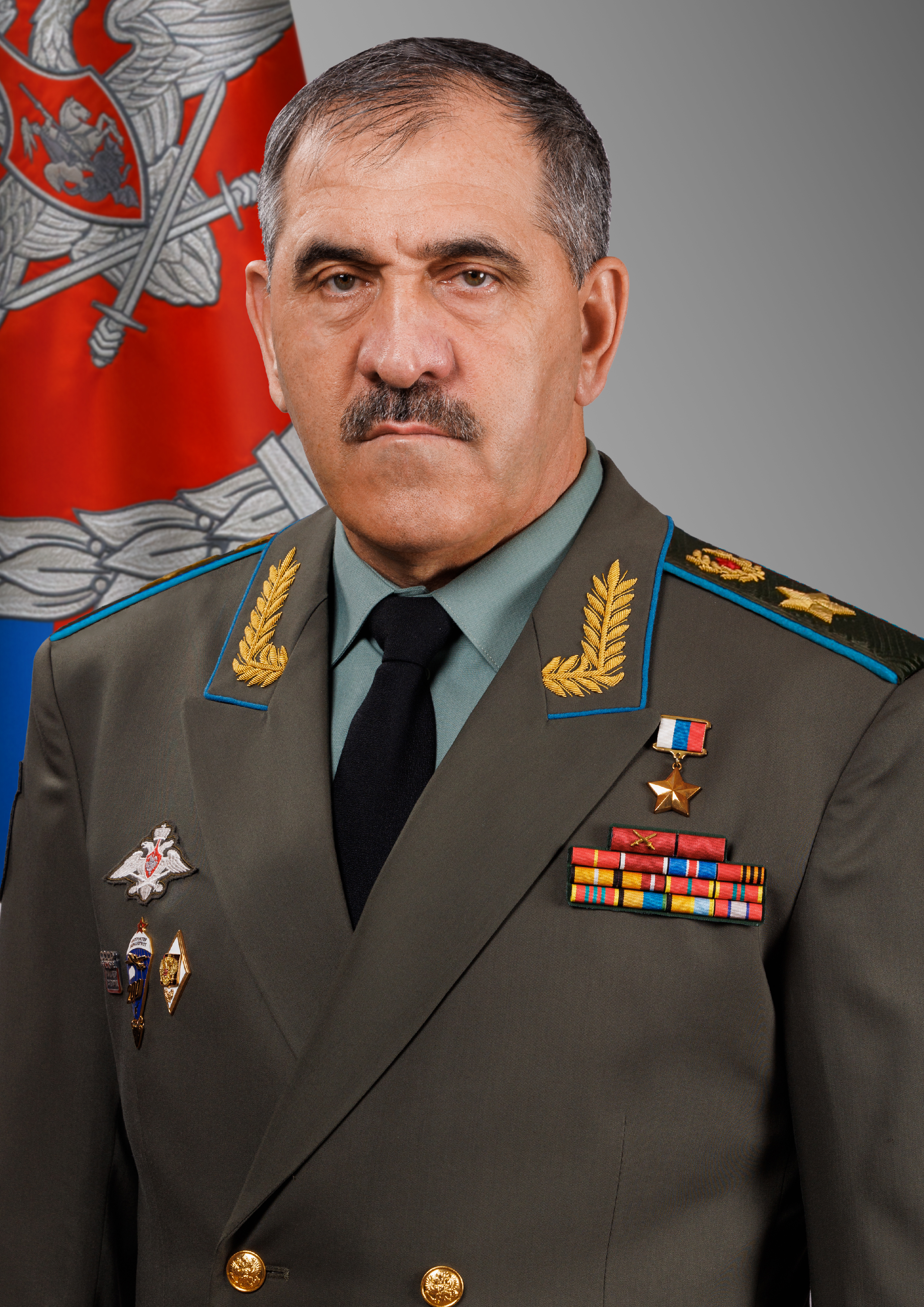
- Official portrait, 2024

Deputy Minister of Defence
- Incumbent
- Assumed office 8 July 2019
- President: Vladimir Putin
- Prime Minister: Dmitry Medvedev; Mikhail Mishustin
- Minister: Sergey Shoygu; Andrey Belousov

3rd Head of Ingushetia
- In office 31 October 2008 – 26 June 2019
- Prime Minister: Makhmud Sakalov; Mukharbek Didigov; Magomet Tatriev; Mukharbek Dikazhev; Zyalimkhan Yevloev; Magomet Yandiev
- Preceded by: Murat Zyazikov
- Succeeded by: Mahmud-Ali Kalimatov

Personal details
- Born: 23 July 1963 (age 63) Tarskoye, North Ossetian ASSR, Soviet Union
- Party: United Russia
- Spouse: Mareta Yevkurova (m. 2007)
- Children: 5
- Profession: Military officer, politician
- Awards: Hero of Russia; Order of Military Merit; Order of the Red Star; Medal For Courage (2)

Military service
- Allegiance: Soviet Union (to 1991); Russia
- Branch/service: Soviet Navy; Soviet Airborne Forces; Russian Airborne Forces
- Years of service: 1982–2008; 2019–present
- Rank: General of the Army
- Battles/wars: Second Chechen War; Kosovo War; Second Chechen War; Russo-Ukrainian war
- Yunus-Bek Yevkurov's voice recorded June 2013

General of the Army Yunus-bek Bamatgireyevich Yevkurov (Note: In this name that follows East Slavic naming customs, the patronymic is Bamatgireyevich and the family name is Yevkurov.) (Note: Russian: Юну́с-Бек Баматгире́евич Евку́ров; Ingush: Йовкурнаь́къан Бама́тгире Ю́нусбике, romanized: Yovkurnäqhan Bamatgire Yunusbike) (born 23 July 1963) is a Russian military officer and politician who has served as a deputy minister of defense since 2019. He was previously the head of the Republic of Ingushetia from 2008 to 2019.

He is a career soldier, paratrooper, and Hero of the Russian Federation who was involved in numerous conflicts, including the Kosovo War and the Second Chechen War. On 22 June 2009, Yevkurov was seriously injured following a car-bomb attack on his motorcade in the city of Nazran.

As head of Ingushetia, Yevkurov claimed he had succeeded in stabilising the crime situation and bringing about positive social changes within the Russian republic. From September 2018 onward, he faced domestic opposition, following a controversial land transfer deal with the neighboring Republic of Chechnya.

== Early life ==
Yevkurov, an ethnic Ingush, was born on 23 July 1963 into a peasant family with 12 children. He had five sisters and six brothers. He graduated from the same school that was later the scene of the Beslan school siege.

== Military service ==
Yevkurov was conscripted into the Soviet Armed Forces in 1982 and served in the Naval Infantry of the Pacific Fleet. In 1989, he graduated from the Ryazan Guards Higher Airborne Command School. Yevkurov continued his military education, graduating from the Frunze Military Academy in 1997 and from the General Staff Academy in 2004.

In June 1999, Yevkurov was stationed in the Bosnian town of Ugljevik with the Russian peacekeepers under the auspices of SFOR. On 12 June, he led a task force on a swift 500 km long march to secure the Pristina International Airport ahead of NATO troops, thereby ensuring a Russian presence in Kosovo following the NATO bombing of Yugoslavia. This led to a standoff with NATO troops.

Yevkurov has had various positions of command within the Russian Airborne Troops and has participated in wars in the North Caucasus. During the course of the Second Chechen War in 2000, he was in command of the 217th Guards Airborne Regiment (98th Guards Airborne Division). During a reconnaissance mission, Yevkurov's team discovered a house where a group of captured Russian soldiers was being held. Having neutralized the guards and infiltrated the building, the team was surrounded by Chechen reinforcements, resulting in armed combat. The Russian troops were able to break through the encirclement while Yevkurov was providing cover for the evacuation of the wounded. He personally carried a soldier to safety despite sustaining an injury himself. Twelve imprisoned soldiers were rescued. On 13 April 2000, Yevkurov, for his courage, was presented with the Hero of Russia award, the country's highest title of honor.

In 2004, Yevkurov was appointed Deputy Chief of the Intelligence Directorate of the Volga-Urals Military District.

== Political career ==
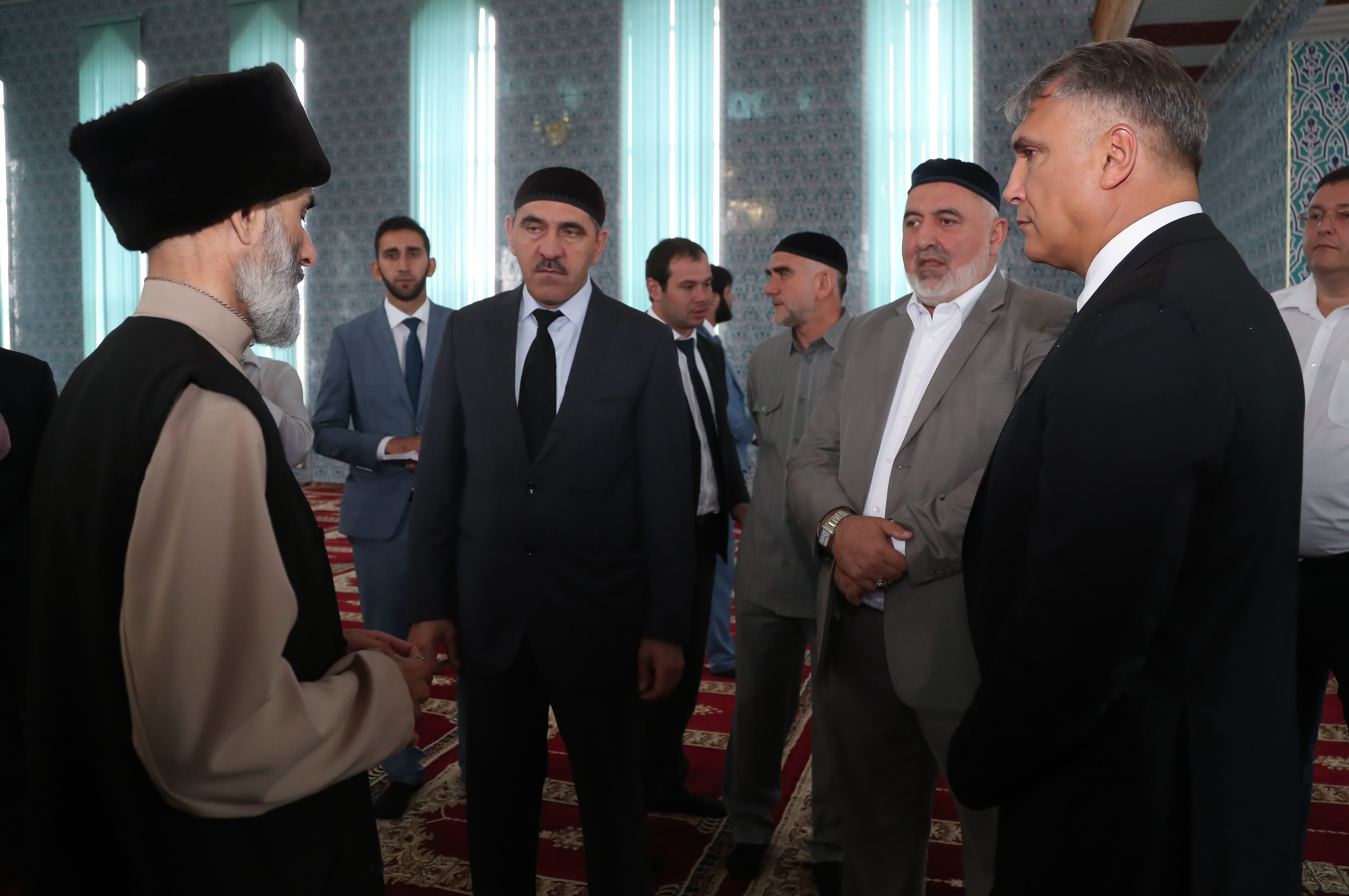
Yevkurov at a mosque in Ingushetia on 14 July 2018

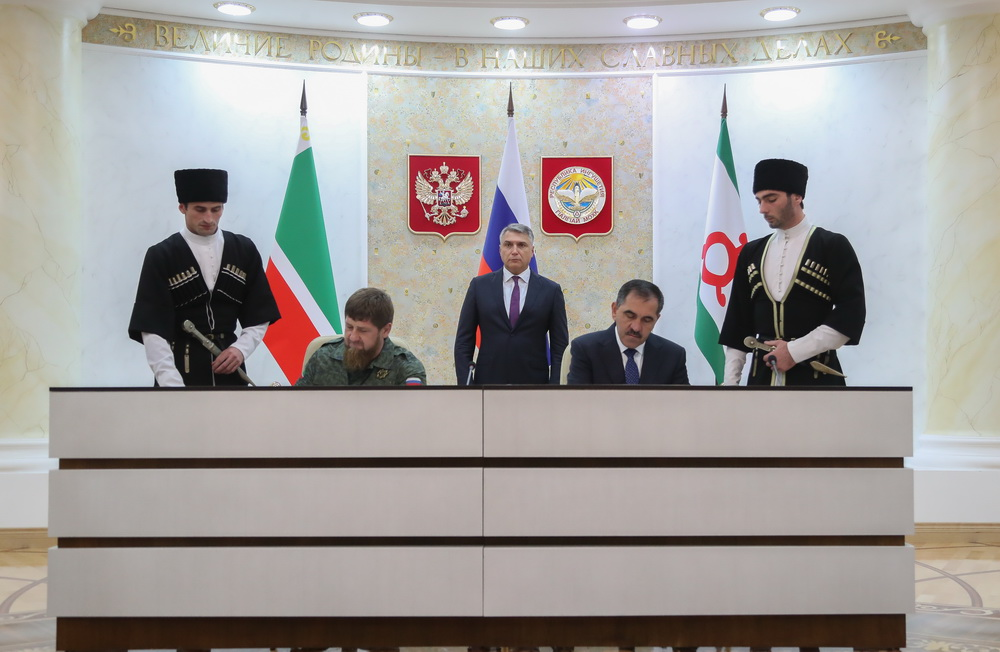
Yevkurov and Chechen leader Ramzan Kadyrov in September 2018

On 30 October 2008, Yevkurov replaced the highly unpopular Murat Zyazikov as the head of Ingushetia. Zyazikov's dismissal and Yevkurov's appointment were received with much enthusiasm from the Ingush population.

=== Assassination attempt ===
On 22 June 2009, Yevkurov was seriously injured following a car-bomb attack on his motorcade in the city of Nazran at roughly 08:20 local time (04:20 GMT). During the incident, a Toyota Camry filled with explosives rammed the Yevkurov's convoy in what is believed to be a suicide bomb attack. One police officer escorting the convoy died at the scene; Yevkurov's driver and cousin, Ramzan, died in hospital a few days later. Yevkurov's brother Uvais was among the injured. Yevkurov suffered a ruptured liver, a severe concussion, and several cracked ribs, but was expected to survive following surgery. Yevkurov was then airlifted to a hospital in Moscow and was sent to intensive care with damage to his skull and internal organs, according to the New York Times.

Though no group has yet claimed responsibility, Russian President Dmitry Medvedev accused Islamist militants of carrying out the attack, condemning the "terrorist attack". Speaking on Russian television, Medvedev claimed that Yevkurov "did a lot to restore order ... and the bandits obviously didn't like that kind of activity". Russian news agency RIAN, quoting an unnamed Kremlin source, reported that executive authority in Ingushetia has been temporarily transferred to the prime minister, Rashid Gaisanov, who became acting Head by Russian presidential decree. The source claimed that "President Medvedev authorized Gaysanov to take operative management of the republic, and he has all the required authority for that". Gaisanov remained the acting head of Ingushetia until Yevkurov returned to office.

The attack followed other attacks on republic officials in June 2009. On 10 June, the deputy chief justice of the Ingushetian Supreme Court, Aza Gazgireyeva, was gunned down in Nazran shortly after dropping her children off at school, and on 13 June the former deputy prime minister, Bashir Aushev, was shot dead outside his home.

After the attack, Chechen leader Ramzan Kadyrov claimed that the Kremlin had ordered him to fight insurgents in Ingushetia. During a subsequent visit to the republic on 24 June, he pledged to take ruthless revenge. On 4 July, a convoy of Chechen troops sent by Kadyrov into Ingushetia in response to the suicide bombing was ambushed by militants. The attack caused nine Chechen deaths, with 10 others severely wounded.

On 9 July, Ingushetia's Interior Ministry announced the arrest of several suspects, including the Chechen rebel commander Rustaman Makhauri, allegedly involved in the attack on Yevkurov.

Yevkurov regained consciousness from a coma two weeks after the attack. Yevkurov was released from the hospital in Moscow on 12 August 2009, more than seven weeks after the attack, but continued to receive rehabilitation. Speaking to reporters upon leaving the hospital, Yevkurov warned that "those who refuse to lay down their arms and surrender will be killed."

By September, 2009, Yevkurov had returned to his position as head of the republic.

=== Till resignation ===
In July 2013, he announced his own resignation following the upcoming elections to the Ingush presidency, though he remained the acting head until the elections.

He was re-elected in the 2013 election for the head of Ingushetia. In the 2018 Russian gubernatorial elections, he was re-elected as the Head of the Republic by 26 out of 32 members of the People's Assembly of the Republic of Ingushetia.

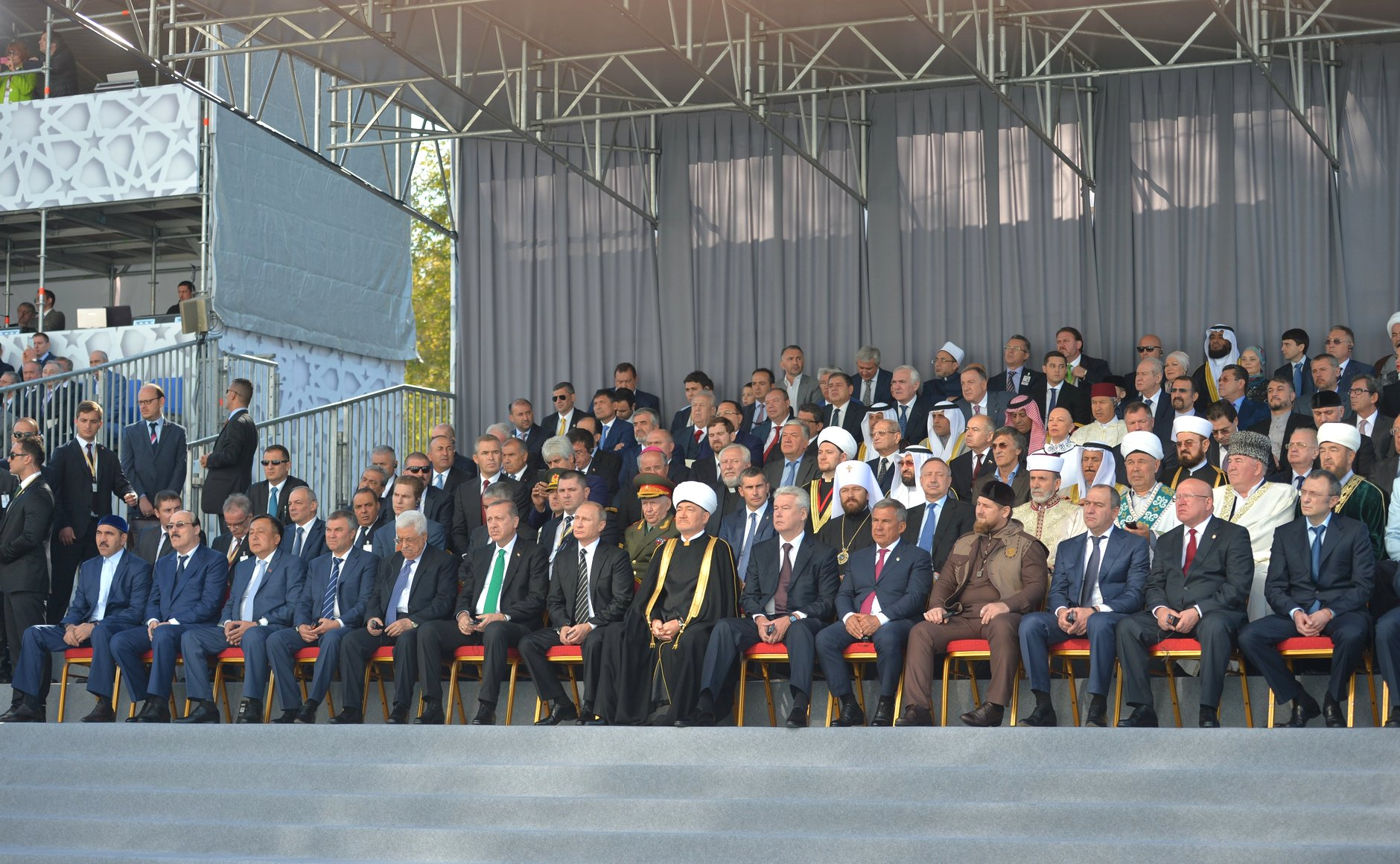
Yevkurov (far left), Putin, Kadyrov and Turkish President Erdoğan during the opening of Moscow's Cathedral Mosque on 23 September 2015

Yevkurov stepped down from his position permanently on 24 June 2019 after months of controversy over the land swap agreement with Chechnya signed in September 2018.

=== Relations to religious authorities of Ingushetia ===
Yevkurov had a decade-old spat with Ingushetian religious leadership from his appointment until he was excommunicated by the local Muftiate in 2018. According to The Muslim Spiritual Center of Ingushetia, he is no longer no longer permitted to participate in wedding or funeral ceremonies conducted by the organization. Yevkurov decided to legalize the republic's non-violent Salafist community and include their mosques into the Muftiate. Ingushetian official religious leaders traditionally follow the Qadiria and Naqshbandia schools of Sufism. He also banned building a new mosque in Magas and ordered that all sermons in the republic's mosques be video recorded for later review.

=== Defence Ministry role ===
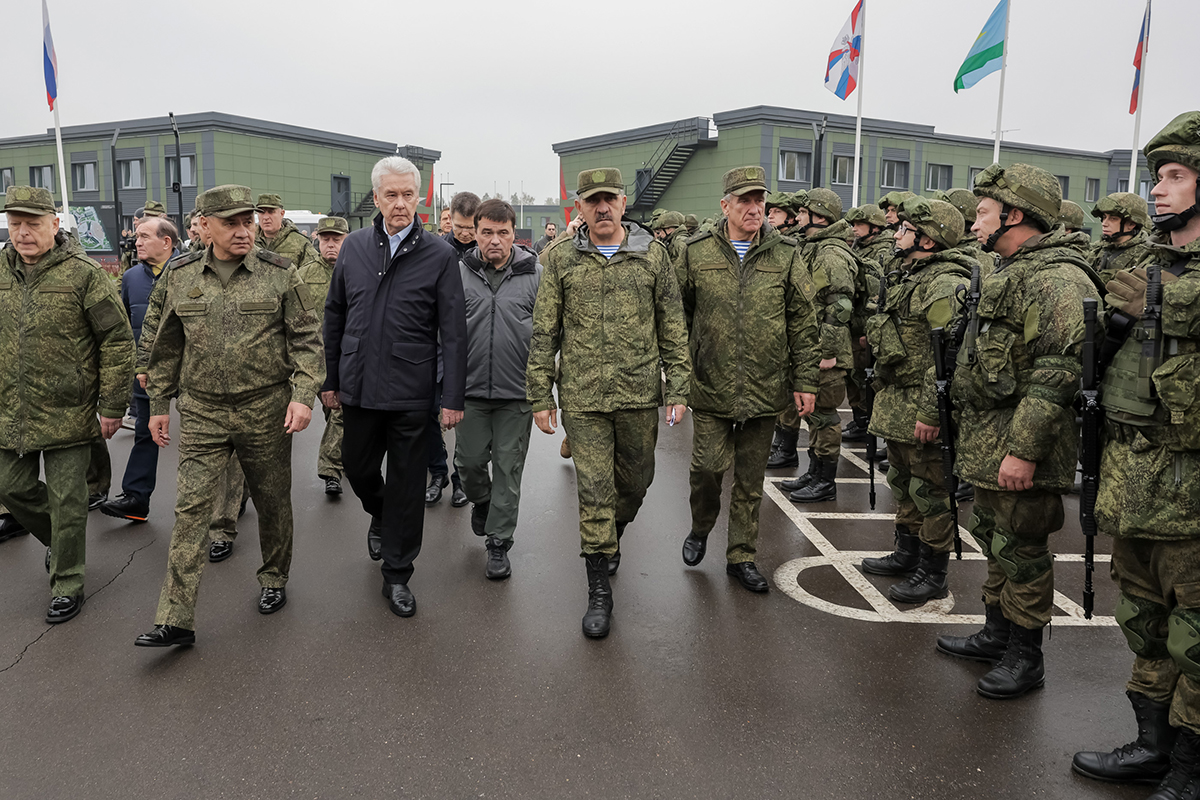
Yevkurov, Defence Minister Sergei Shoigu and Moscow Mayor Sergey Sobyanin inspect a facility where mobilized Russian recruits were trained on 1 October 2022

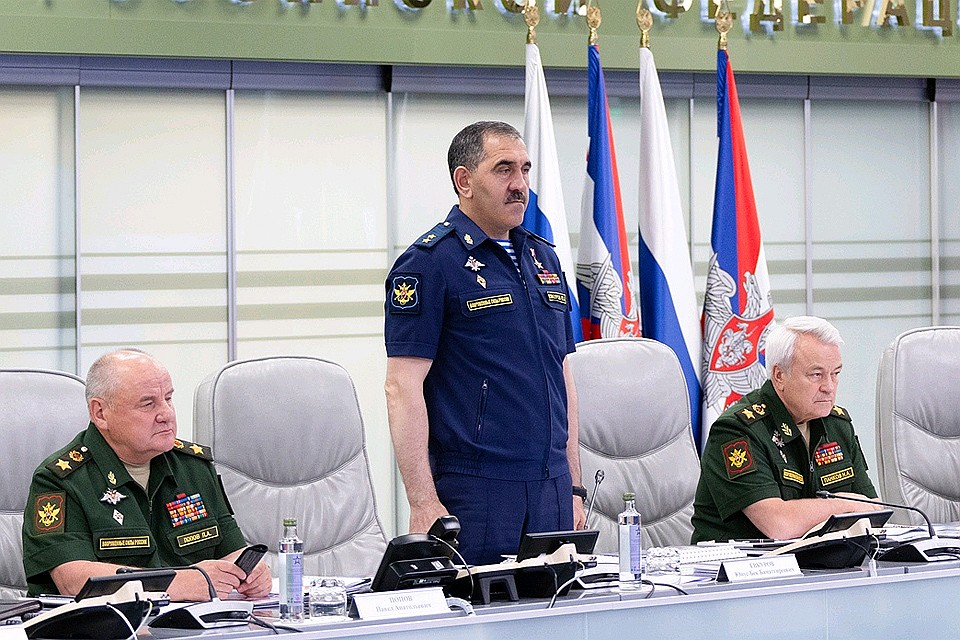
Lieutenant general Yevkurov as a Deputy Defence Minister

Yevkurov was appointed as a Deputy Defence Minister by a decree of President Vladimir Putin on 8 July 2019, also being promoted to lieutenant general. On 8 December 2021, he was further promoted to the rank of colonel general. On December 9, 2024, he was promoted to the rank of army general.

During the 2023 Wagner Group mutiny, Yevkurov was in Rostov-on-Don when Yevgeny Prigozhin's forces reached the city. Subsequently, Prigozhin published a Telegram video of him meeting with Yevkurov and Deputy Chief of Staff Vladimir Alexeyev and criticizing the actions of Russian military leadership.

Afterwards, Belarus president Lukashenko praised him (together with Alexander Bortnikov) for mediating the end of the rebellion.

In August 2023, a Russian delegation led by Yevkurov met with Burkina Faso leader Ibrahim Traoré, along with other Burkinabe military officials, to discuss a Russian-Burkinabe military cooperation. On the same trip he visited Mali capital Bamako and Ouagadougou in Burkina Faso.

=== Sanctions ===
Yevkurov has been sanctioned and put under restrictive measures by various countries, including the US, the EU, the UK government, New Zealand, Canada, Ukraine, Australia, and Japan.

== Personal life ==
Yevkurov married Mareta Yevkurova on 23 December 2007. They are parents of five children. Their first son was born on 1 November 2008. His nephew Captain Adam Khamkhoev was a commander of an airborne assault company and died on 21 May 2022 during the Russian invasion of Ukraine.

== Honours and awards ==
- Hero of the Russian Federation
- Order of Courage
- Order of Military Merit
- Order of the Red Star
- Medal For Courage, twice

== See also ==
- List of Heroes of the Russian Federation
