= Head of the Republic of Ingushetia =

Highest-ranking official in Ingushetia, Russia

- ГӀалгӀай Республика Мехкда (Ingush); Глава Республики Ингушетия (Russian)
- Standard of the head of the Republic of Ingushetia

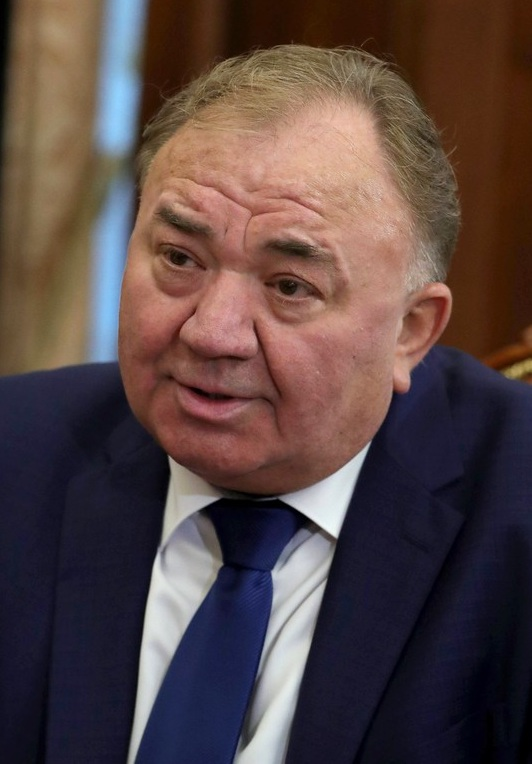
- Incumbent; Mahmud-Ali Kalimatov since 8 September 2019
- Executive branch of the Republic of Ingushetia
- Style: His Excellency; The Honorable
- Type: Governor; Head of state; Head of government
- Nominator: President of Russia
- Appointer: People's Assembly
- Term length: 5 years, renewable
- Formation: 18 February 1993
- First holder: Ruslan Aushev
- Website: Official website

The head of the Republic of Ingushetia (Russian: Глава Республики Ингушетия, formerly president of the Republic of Ingushetia) is the highest office within the Government of Ingushetia, Russia. The head is elected by Parliament of Ingushetia. Term of service is five years.

== History ==
On 4 June 1992, the Supreme Soviet of Russia adopted Act No. 2927-1 "On the formation of the Ingush Republic within the Russian Federation". Checheno-Ingushetia was officially divided into Ingushetia and Chechnya. On 2 November 1992, by the presidential decree, a state of emergency was introduced on the territory of the future Ingushetia and the Provisional Administration was created.

On February 28, 1993, elections of the President of the Ingush Republic were held, at which only one candidate was participating, Major General Ruslan Aushev. Having received the support of 99.94% of the voters, he became the first president of Ingushetia. On March 7, the inauguration of the first President of Ingushetia took place in the House of Culture of Nazran. On December 29, 2001, Aushev announced his early resignation.

On April 7, 2002, early presidential elections were held in the Republic of Ingushetia. Eight candidates applied for this post, but none of them received more than 50% of the vote. On April 28, 2002, Murat Zyazikov was elected in the second round with 53,15%. In 2004, at the initiative of the President of Russia Vladimir Putin, the elections of governors were canceled in favor of appointment of President's suggested candidates by the regional legislatures.

Since January 1, 2011, the position has been renamed from "President of the Republic of Ingushetia" to "Head of the Republic of Ingushetia". On June 1, 2012, a federal law came into force providing for the return of direct gubernatorial elections in Russia. On April 2, 2013, five months before the expected elections in Ingushetia, Russian President Vladimir Putin signed a law according to which the regions were given the right to independently determine the procedure for electing a head of the region. On May 7, members of the People's Assembly of Ingushetia voted to abolish direct elections of the head of the republic.

== List ==
No.	Portrait	Name (born–died)	Term of office			Political party	Election	Ref.
No.	Portrait	Name (born–died)	Took office	Left office	Time in office	Political party	Election	Ref.
President of Ingushetia (1993–2010)
1		Ruslan Aushev (born 1954)	7 March 1993	28 December 2001	8 years, 296 days	Independent	1993; 1994; 1998	
–		Akhmed Malsagov (born 1960)	28 December 2001	23 May 2002	146 days	Independent	– (Note: Acting president as chairman of the Government of Ingushetia.)	
2		Murat Zyazikov (born 1957)	23 May 2002	30 October 2008	6 years, 160 days	Independent	2002; 2005 (Note: Approved by the People's Assembly.)	
3		Yunus-bek Yevkurov (born 1963)	30 October 2008	3 July 2009	246 days	United Russia	2008 (Note: Appointed by Dmitry Medvedev as Acting President of Ingushetia, approved by the People's Assembly.)	
–		Rashid Gaisanov (born 1972)	3 July 2009	12 August 2009	40 days	United Russia	– (Note: Acting president as chairman of the Government of Ingushetia. Appointed after Yevkurov's assassination attempt.)	
(3)		Yunus-bek Yevkurov (born 1963)	12 August 2009	31 December 2010	1 year, 141 days	United Russia	–	
Head of Ingushetia (2011–present)
(3)		Yunus-bek Yevkurov (born 1963)	1 January 2011	5 July 2013	2 years, 185 days	United Russia	–	
–		Yunus-bek Yevkurov (born 1963)	5 July 2013	8 September 2013	65 days	United Russia	– (Note: Appointed by Vladimir Putin as Acting Head of Ingushetia.)	
(3)		Yunus-bek Yevkurov (born 1963)	8 September 2013	26 June 2019	5 years, 291 days	United Russia	2013; 2018	
–		Mahmud-Ali Kalimatov (born 1959)	26 June 2019	8 September 2019	74 days	United Russia	—	
4		Mahmud-Ali Kalimatov (born 1959)	8 September 2019	Incumbent	6 years, 364 days	United Russia	2019; 2024	
