= Dzhermen Gvishiani =

Soviet sociologist (1928–2003)

Dzhermen Mikhailovich Gvishiani (24 December 1928, Akhaltsikhe – 18 May 2003, Moscow) was a Soviet and Russian philosopher, sociologist, management theorist and scientific administrator.

== Early life and family ==
Dzhermen Gvishiani was born the son of Mikhail Maksimovich Gvishiani, a Georgian and an Armenian mother. His forename was composed of the first part of Felix Dzerzhinsky's surname (Dzher) followed by the first part of Vyacheslav Menzhinsky's surname (men). Both were former chairmen of the Joint State Political Directorate (OGPU) for whom his father worked.

In 1948 he married Lyudmila Gvishiani (Kosygina), a librarian and the only daughter of the Soviet Prime Minister (by 1948 - Minister of Finances) Alexei Kosygin.

His son, Alexei Gvishiani, is a prominent Russian geoinformatics scientist. Granddaughter, Ekaterina Semenikhina, art collector and Russian honorary consul in Monaco.

== Career ==
Gvishiani graduated from the Moscow State Institute of International Relations in 1951 and became a member of the Communist Party in the same year. He also joined the Soviet Navy that year, serving until 1955. Then he started work for the State Committee for New Technology. However, when the organisation was superseded by the State Committee for Science and Technology in 1965, he was appointed Deputy Chairman under Vladimir Kirillin. Member of the Club of Rome, co-founder of the International Institute for Applied Systems Analysis and head of its Soviet branch, Institute for Systems Analysis of the Academy of Sciences of the Soviet Union, known for its free-thinking atmosphere unusual in the heavily ideologized Soviet environment that was essential to develop a market-oriented programme of further reforms of the Soviet economy. In the 1980s he served as the deputy head of Soviet Gosplan. Gvishiani was a member of the United Nations Advisory Committee on Science and Technology (ACAST) since its inception in 1964.

== Publications ==
- Organisation and management;: A sociological analysis of Western theories (1972) Moscow: Progress Publishers
- Systems Research: Methodological Problems (1984) Oxford: Pergamon Press
