= New Great Game =

Journalistic term for predicted conflict over central Asian resources

New Great Game describes a renewed geopolitical interest in Central Asia.

The original Great Game was the 19th-century political and diplomatic competition between the British and Russian empires for territory and influence among Central Asian states. The term entered into widespread use following the Soviet invasion of Afghanistan in 1979.

== History ==
=== Continuation of Great Game or Second Great Game ===
The "original" Great Game is traditionally seen as ending with the Anglo-Russian Convention of 1907, when the British and Russian Empires had formally defined their frontiers and ended their rivalry over Afghanistan, Persia, and Tibet. In 1987, Karl E. Meyer wrote that the Great Game continued after 1907, citing the Russian involvement against the Persian Constitutional Revolution; Russia was supported by the United Kingdom in this endeavour.

Some historians view events from the Russian Civil War and Soviet wars in Asia in the Interwar period, and categorize them as a continuation of the original Great Game, or as a second Great Game up to the mid-20th century. According to Morris, in a review of a history book by Meyer and Brysac,

the Raj more or less bows out, the Tsar is removed and the Great Game is diffused into a miasmic free-for-all among the states. Now Americans, Germans, Chinese and Soviet Russians throw themselves into the power vacuum of Central Asia, to many theorists the heartland of the world, and riddled with symbolism.

Historian David Noack writes that the Great Game resumed from 1919 to 1933 as a conflict between the United Kingdom and the Soviet Union, with the Weimar Republic and Japan as additional players. Noack calls it a "Second Tournament of Shadows" over the territory composing the border of British India, China, the Soviet Union and Japanese Manchuria. To the United Kingdom, the Germans appeared to be a secret Soviet ally. In 1933–1934, it "ended with Mongolia, Soviet Central Asia, Tannu-Tuva and Xinjiang isolated from non-Soviet influence."

According to scholars Andrei Znamenski and Alexandre Andreev the Soviet Union continued elements of the Great Game into the 1930s, focused on secret diplomacy and espionage in Tibet and Mongolia. Agents in the new Soviet version included figures such as Agvan Dorzhiev, who had supported the Russian Empire previously. Historian Heather Campbell describes the continuation of elements of the Great Game by the British as well; Lord Curzon, a former viceroy of India who was concerned heavily with Russia strategy, would heavily influence policy in supporting the Tsarist Whites against the Soviet Union, as well as participating in the Sykes–Picot negotiations dividing the Middle East between the United Kingdom and France with the diplomatic support of Russia. Andreyev highlights that one of the original issues of the Great Game, a projected Russian invasion of India, was also revived by Trotsky with the planned Kalmyk Project.

Znamenski wrote that Soviet Communists of the 1920s aimed to extend their influence over Mongolia and Tibet, using the mythical Buddhist kingdom of Shambhala as a form of propaganda to further this mission, in a sort of "great Bolshevik game". The expedition of Russian symbolist Nicholas Roerich has been put in context of the Great Game due to his interest in Tibet, Although Roerich did not like the Communists, he agreed to help Soviet intelligence and influence operations due to a shared paranoia towards the United Kingdom, as well as his goal to form a "Sacred Union of the East". Jan Morris states that "Roerich brought the bewilderments of the later Great Game to America" through mysticism movements called Roerichism.

When the Soviets invaded Afghanistan in 1979 the United Kingdom, under the directive of Margaret Thatcher immediately sent military aid and training to the Afghan resistance. This became known as the 'Second Great Game'. The United Kingdom Secret Intelligence Service (MI6) provided both indirect and direct support for the Afghan mujahideen in their fight against the Soviet Union, including secretly arming, funding and supplying various factions.

=== New Great Game ===
In 1996, The New York Times published an opinion piece titled "The New Great Game in Asia" in which was written:

While few have noticed, Central Asia has again emerged as a murky battleground among big powers engaged in an old and rough geopolitical game. Western experts believe that the largely untapped oil and natural gas riches of the Caspian Sea countries could make that region the Persian Gulf of the next century. The object of the revived game is to befriend leaders of the former Soviet republics controlling the oil, while neutralizing Russian suspicions and devising secure alternative pipeline routes to world markets.

In 2004, journalist Lutz Kleveman wrote a book that linked the expression to the exploration of mineral wealth in the region. While the direct American military involvement in the area was part of fighting the "war on terror" rather than an indirect Western governmental interest in the mineral wealth, another journalist Eric Walberg suggests in his book that access to the region's minerals and oil pipeline routes is still an important factor. The interest in oil and gas includes pipelines that transmit energy to China's east coast. One view of the New Great Game is a shift to geoeconomic compared to geopolitical competition. Xiangming Chen believes that China's role is more like the United Kingdom than Russia's in the New Great Game, where Russia plays the role that the Russian Empire originally did. "China and Russia are the two dominant power players vs. the weaker independent Central Asian states".

Other authors have criticized the reuse of the term "Great Game". According to strategic analyst Ajay Patnaik, the "New Great Game" is a misnomer, because rather than two empires focused on the region as in the past, there are now many global and regional powers active with the rise of China and India as major economic powers. Central Asian states have diversified their political, economic, and security relationships. David Gosset of CEIBS Shanghai states "the Shanghai Cooperation Organization (SCO) established in 2001 is showing that Central Asia’s actors have gained some real degree of independence. But fundamentally, the China factor introduces a level of predictability " In the 2015 international relations book Globalizing Central Asia, the authors state that Central Asian states have pursued a multivectored approach in balancing out the political and economic interests of larger powers, but it has had mixed success due to strategic reversals of administrations regarding the West, China, and Russia. They suppose that China could counterbalance Russia. However, Russia and China have a strategic partnership since 2001. According to Ajay Patnaik, "China has advanced carefully in the region, using the SCO as the main regional mechanism, but never challenging Russian interests in Central Asia." In the Carnegie Endowment, Paul Stronski and Nicole Ng wrote in 2018 that China has not fundamentally challenged any Russian interests in Central Asia. They suggested that China, Russia, and the West could have mutual interests in regional stability in Central Asia. According to Paul Stronski and Nicole Ng, China uses its policy in Central Asia to "manage" Russia's concerns, satisfying Russia by showing China's economic aims do not threaten Russian political-military interests in the Russian Far East and elsewhere besides Central Asia, and assuaging Russia's demographic fears about Chinese immigration.

The historian James Reardon-Anderson stated in 2014, during the first withdrawal of U.S. troops in Afghanistan, that, "There may be a new Great Game in Central Asia, but it is going to have a lot less importance to the United States than the new Great Game in the Western Pacific and East Asian waters." In August 2021, Reuters reported that following the Taliban takeover, the "new Great Game has Pakistan in control" of Afghanistan and also involves India and China. In Nikkei, writer and retired Admiral James Stavridis stated that the "new Great Game" involves Russia's interest in the regulation of opium production, China's interest in rare earth minerals, a growing role for India, while the West will be reluctant to enter. Following the 2021 U.S. withdrawal from Afghanistan, RFE/RL reported that "Russia, China, Pakistan, and Iran could come together in the next chapter of the Great Game," or "Moscow, Beijing, Islamabad, and Tehran are each merely looking to advance their own interests in the new geopolitical order."

In a 2020 study, the New Great Game was described as a form of "Civilizational Colonialism" in border regions and areas of territorial disputes, united by their location in High Asia or "The Roof of the World". Kashmir, Hazara, Nuristan, Laghman, Azad Kashmir, Jammu, Himachal Pradesh, Ladakh, Gilgit Baltistan, Chitral, Western Tibet, Western Xinjiang, Badakhshan, Gorno Badakhshan, Fergana, Osh and Turkistan Region. These rich resource areas are surrounded by the five major mountainous systems of Tien Shan, Pamirs, Karakoram, Hindu Kush and Western Himalayas and the three main river systems of Amu Darya, Syr Darya and Indus.

The "Great Game" as a term has been described as a cliché-metaphor, and there are authors who have now written on the topics of "The Great Game" in Antarctica, the world's far north, and in outer space.

"The New Great Game" is also the title of a 2021 paper written by J.A. Ritoe to refer to the increasing competition between great economic powers like the European Union, the United States and the People's Republic of China to secure access to the critical raw materials required for strategic industries such as the aerospace and defense industry, medical appliances and clean energy technology.

== See also ==
- Anglo-Soviet invasion of Iran
- Cold War
- Geostrategy in Central Asia
- The Great Game (Hopkirk book)
- Iran–United Kingdom relations
- Russia–United Kingdom relations
- Strategic geography
- United Kingdom in the Soviet–Afghan War
- Western imperialism in Asia

== Sources ==
- Aberkane, Idriss J. (31 March 2011). "Brzezinski on a U.S. Berezina: anticipating a new, New World Order". e-International Relations.
- "Wikileaks files: US ambassador criticised Prince Andrew". BBC News. 30 November 2010.
- Bearden, Milton (November–December 2001). "Afghanistan, Graveyard of Empires". Foreign Affairs. Archived from the original on 3 May 2015.
- Coll, Steve (2004). Ghost Wars: The Secret History of the CIA, Afghanistan, and Bin Laden, from the Soviet Invasion to September 10, 2001. Penguin. p. 333. ISBN 978-1-59420-007-6.
- Contessi, Nicola (2013). "Central Eurasia and the New Great Game: Players, Moves, Outcomes, and Scholarship". Asian Security. 9 (3): 231–241. doi:10.1080/14799855.2013.832214. S2CID 144592857.
- Cooley, Alexander (2012). Great Games, Local Rules: The New Great Power Contest in Central Asia. Oxford University Press. ISBN 978-0-19-992982-5.
- Edwards, Matthew (March 2003). "The New Great Game and the new great gamers: disciples of Kipling and Mackinder". Central Asian Survey. 22 (1): 83–102. doi:10.1080/0263493032000108644. S2CID 53963541.
- Farndale, Nigel (30 May 2012). "Afghanistan: the Great Game, BBC Two, review". The Daily Telegraph.
- Gfoeller, Tatiana (29 October 2008). "Candid discussion with Prince Andrew on the Kyrgyz economy and the "great game"". Public Library of US Diplomacy. WikiLeaks.
- Golshanpazhooh, Mahmoud Reza (22 October 2011). "Review: Post Modern Imperialism: Geopolitics and the Great Games by Eric Walberg". Iran Review.
- Gratale, Joseph Michael (26 March 2012). "Walberg, Eric. Postmodern Imperialism: Geopolitics and the Great Games". European Journal of American Studies. Reviews 2012-1, document 9. doi:10.4000/ejas.9709. ISSN 1991-9336. S2CID 159050841.
- Peake, Hayden B. (2004). "The Great Game: The Myth and Reality of Espionage". Intelligence in Recent Public Literature. Studies in Intelligence. 48 (3): 83–86. Archived from the original on 13 June 2007.
- Hopkirk, Peter (1992). The Great Game: The Struggle for Empire in Central Asia. Kodansha International. ISBN 978-1-56836-022-5.
- Kaylan, Melik (13 August 2008). "Welcome Back To the Great Game". The Wall Street Journal.
- Kleveman, Lutz (2004). The New Great Game: Blood and Oil in Central Asia. Atlantic Monthly Press. ISBN 978-0-87113-906-1.
- Latifi, Ali M (22 June 2012). "Executed Afghan president stages 'comeback'". Al Jazeera.
- Lloyd, Trevor Owen (2001). Empire: The History of the British Empire. Continuum International Publishing Group. ISBN 978-1-85285-259-7.
- Mahajan, Sneh (2001). British Foreign Policy 1874–1914: The Role of India. Routledge Studies in Modern European History. Vol. 4. Routledge. ISBN 978-0-415-26010-7.
- Menon, Rajan (2003). "The New Great Game in Central Asia". Survival. 45 (2): 187–204. doi:10.1080/00396338.2003.9688581. S2CID 154442487.
- Morgan, Gerald (1973). "Myth and Reality in the Great Game". Asian Affairs. 4 (1): 55–65. doi:10.1080/03068377308729652.
- "The New Great Game in Asia". The New York Times. 2 January 1996.
- Penzev, Konstantin (12 November 2010). "When Will the Great Game End?". New Eastern Outlook. Archived from the original on 10 December 2010.
- Piper, David (9 June 2012). "The 'Great Game' of influence in Afghanistan continues but with different players". Fox News.
- Rashid, Ahmed (2000). Taliban: Islam, Oil and the New Great Game in Central Asia. London: I. B. Tauris. ISBN 978-1-86064-830-4.
- Tamm, Eric Enno (2011). The Horse That Leaps Through Clouds: A Tale of Espionage, the Silk Road and the Rise of Modern China. Counterpoint. ISBN 978-1-58243-734-7.
- Yapp, Malcolm (2001). "The Legend of the Great Game" (PDF). Proceedings of the British Academy. 2000 Lectures and Memoirs. Vol. 111. Oxford University Press. pp. 179–198. ISBN 978-0-19-726259-7.
