= Deportation of the Chechens and Ingush =

1944 Soviet ethnic cleansing and genocide

- Part of Population transfer in the Soviet Union, Chechen genocide, and 1940–1944 insurgency in Chechnya
- Destinations of the resettled Chechens and Ingush inside the Soviet Union
- Location: North Caucasus
- Date: 23 February – March 1944
- Target: Expulsion and resettlement of Nakh populations
- Attack type: Genocide, population transfer, ethnic cleansing, massacre, starvation
- Deaths: 123,000–200,000 (Note: • 80,000 Chechens • 43,000 Ingush) (Chechen sources claim 400,000 died)
- Victims: 496,000 Chechens and Ingush deported to forced settlements in the Soviet Union
- Perpetrators: NKVD, the Soviet secret police
- Motive: Russification, cheap labor for forced settlements in the Soviet Union

The Soviet government forcibly transferred the whole of the Vainakh (Chechen and Ingush) populations of the North Caucasus to Central Asia on 23 February 1944, during World War II. The expulsion, referred to by Chechens often as Aardakh (the Exodus), was ordered by NKVD chief Lavrentiy Beria after approval by Soviet leader and dictator Joseph Stalin as part of a Soviet forced settlement program and population transfer that affected several million members of ethnic minorities in the Soviet Union between the 1930s and the 1950s.

The deportation was prepared from at least October 1943 and 19,000 officers as well as 100,000 NKVD soldiers from all over the USSR participated in this operation. The deportation encompassed their entire nations, as well as the liquidation of the Checheno-Ingush Autonomous Soviet Socialist Republic. The demographic consequences of this eviction were catastrophic and far-reaching: of the 496,000 Chechens and Ingush who were deported, at least a quarter died. In total, the archive records show that over a hundred thousand people died or were killed during the round-ups and transportation, and during their early years in exile in the Kazakh and Kyrgyz SSR, as well as Russian SFSR where they were sent to the many forced settlements. Chechen sources claim that 400,000 died, while presuming a higher number of deportees. A higher percentage of Chechens were killed than any other ethnic group persecuted by population transfer in the Soviet Union. Chechens were under administrative supervision of the NKVD officials during that entire time.

The exile lasted for 13 years and the survivors would not return to their native lands until 1957, after the new Soviet authorities under Nikita Khrushchev reversed many of Stalin's policies, including the deportations of nations. A local report indicated that some 432,000 Vainakhs had resettled to the Chechen-Ingush ASSR by 1961, though they faced many obstacles while trying to settle back to the Caucasus, including unemployment, lack of accommodation and ethnic clashes with the local Russian population. Eventually, the Chechens and Ingush recovered and regained the majority of the population. This eviction left a permanent scar in the memory of the survivors and their descendants. February 23 is today remembered as a day of tragedy by most Ingushs and Chechens. Many in Chechnya and Ingushetia classify it as an act of genocide, as did the European Parliament in 2004.

== Historical background ==
The Chechens and the Ingush speak languages that are closely related and have a degree of passive intelligibility, both being Vainakh languages. The Chechen-Russian conflict is one of the longest and most protracted conflicts in modern history, spanning three centuries. Its origins date back to 1785, when the Chechens fought against Russian expansionism into the Caucasus. The Caucasus War was fought between 1817 and 1864. The Russian Empire succeeded in annexing the area and subjugating its people, but also killed or deported numerous non-Russian peoples and was responsible for the Circassian genocide. The Circassians, the Ubykh and the Abaza were subsequently resettled to the Ottoman Empire. However, other Caucasus people were affected as well. There were up to 1.5 million Chechens in the Caucasus in 1847, but as a result of this war and ensuing expulsions, their number dropped to 140,000 in 1861, and then further to 116,000 in 1867. In 1865, at least 39,000 Chechens were exiled to the Ottoman Empire by the Russian Empire.

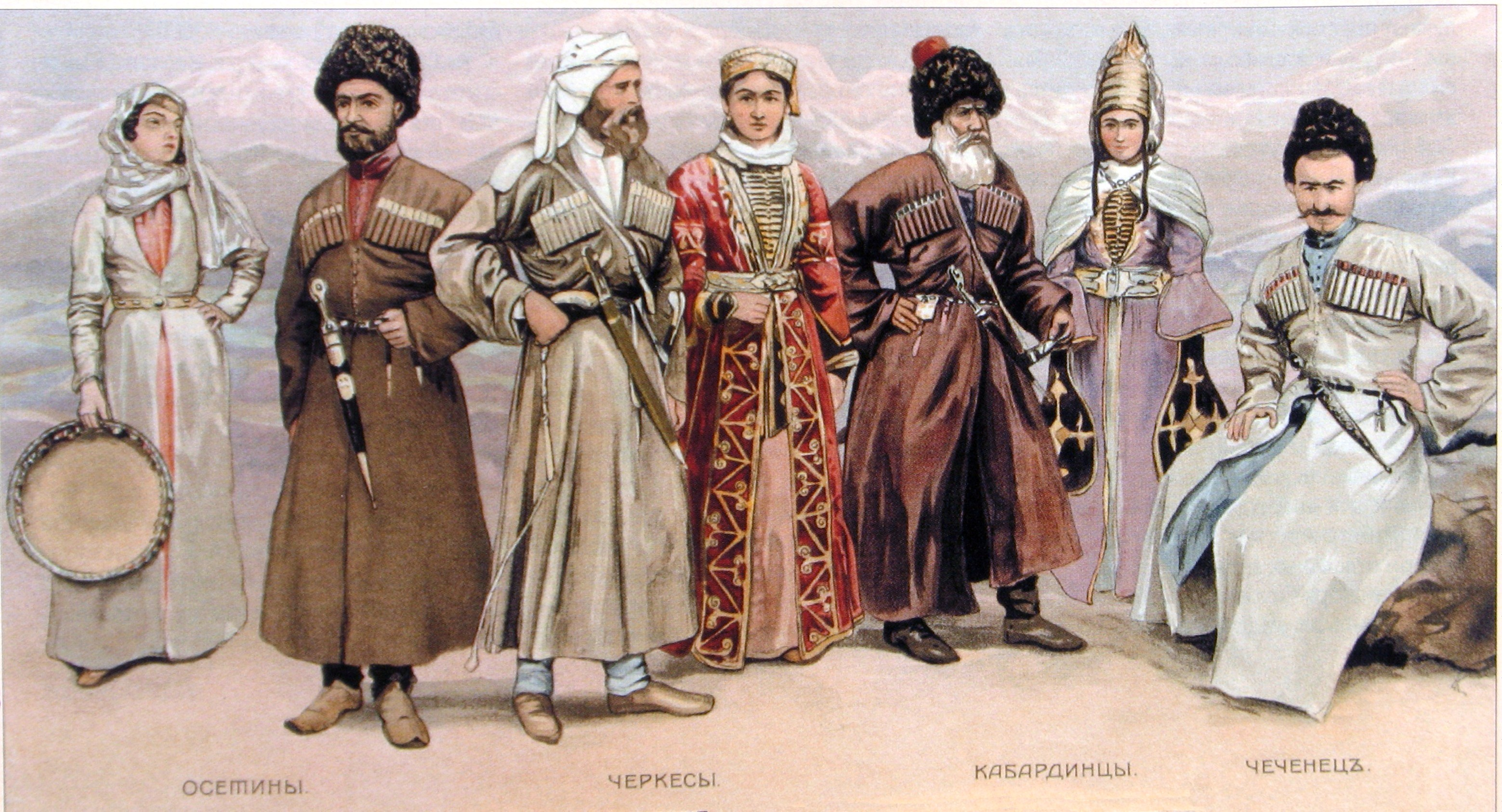
A painting depicting the Chechen, Ossetian, Circassian, and Kabardinian peoples from the Caucasus in the 19th century, with Chechens represented by the man furthest to the right.

In spite of this, the Chechens intermittently demanded a restoration of their independence and rebelled again against the Russian Empire in 1878. During the early era of the Soviet rule, throughout the 1920s and 1930s, Chechens rejected the collectivization and Sovietization policies of the Soviet leader Joseph Stalin. This social resistance was nicknamed the 'Chechen problem'. During this time, Stalin constantly changed their territory, until the Chechen and Ingush Autonomous Oblasts were merged into a single Chechen-Ingush Autonomous Soviet Socialist Republic in 1936.

In 1940, another Chechen insurgency, led by Khasan Israilov, started in Galanchozh. It was partly inspired by the resistance of Finns against the invading Soviets in the Winter War in 1939. In February 1942, Mairbek Sheripov's group rebelled in Shatoysky and Itum-Kalinsky Districts. They united with Israilov's army to rebel against the Soviet system. The Soviet Air Force bombarded the Chechen-Ingush republic in the spring of 1942 to suppress the rebellion. During World War II, the Soviet government accused Chechens and Ingush of cooperating with the Nazi German invaders. The Nazis wanted to reach the Azerbaijan SSR, whose oil reserves around Baku were the goal of Case Blue (Fall Blau). On 25 August 1942, a group of German paratroopers, led by saboteur Osman Gube, landed near the village of Berezhki in the Galashkinsky district in order to organize anti-Soviet actions yet managed to only recruit 13 people in the area.

There were some 20 million Muslims in the USSR, and the Soviet government feared that a Muslim revolt could spread from Caucasus to the whole of Central Asia. In August 1942, the Wehrmacht entered North Caucasus, seizing the Karachay-Cherkessia and Kabardino-Balkar Autonomous Soviet Socialist Republics. It also encouraged anti-Sovietism among the local populace. However, the Nazis never reached Grozny and the only town in the Chechen-Ingush ASSR they briefly occupied was Malgobek, which was predominately inhabited by Russians.

The key period of the Chechen guerilla war started in August–September 1942, when German troops approached Ingushetia, and ended in the summer-autumn of 1943. The Soviet counter-offensive drove the Wehrmacht from the North Caucasus early in 1943.

Various historians, including Moshe Gammer, Ben Fowkes and Tony Wood, refute the Chechens' ties with the Germans, some pointing out that the Nazis stopped at the northwest outskirts of the Chechen-Ingush ASSR, near Mozdok, in Northern Ossetia, and that a majority of the Vainakh never even came into contact with the German army. While there were secret negotiations with the Germans near this border, the Chechen rebels pointed out that they did not favor a rule from Berlin nor from Moscow. Sheripov reportedly gave the Ostministerium a sharp warning that "if the liberation of the Caucasus meant only the exchange of one colonizer for another, the Caucasians would consider this... only a new stage in the national liberation war". In October 1942, Chechens assisted other volunteers to help erect a defensive barrier around Grozny. Between December 1942 and March 1943, Chechens and Ingush contributed 12 million roubles to the Soviet defensive war. 17,413 Chechens joined the Red Army and were awarded 44 decorations while a further 13,363 joined the Chechen-Ingush ASSR People's Militia, ready to defend the area from an invasion. By contrast, Babak Rezvani points out that only about a 100 Chechens collaborated with the Axis powers.

== Deportation ==
On orders from Lavrentiy Beria, the head of the NKVD, the entire Chechen and Ingush population of the Checheno-Ingush ASSR were to be deported by freight trains to remote areas of the Soviet Union. The operation was called "Chechevitsa" (Operation Lentil), its first two syllables pointing at its intended targets. The operation is referred to by Chechens often as "Aardakh" (the Exodus). This operation was being prepared and planned since at least October 1943, and included Beria's two most trusted NKVD officers, Ivan Serov and Bogdan Kobulov. Beria complained to Stalin about the "low level of labour discipline" among Chechens, the "prevalence of banditry and terrorism", the "failure of Chechens to join the communist party" and the "confession of a German agent that he found a lot of support among the local Ingush". Beria then ordered to implement the operation. When Supian Kagirovich Mollaev, the leader of the local government in the Checheno-Ingush ASSR, heard about the decision, he burst into tears, but soon pulled himself together and decided to follow orders. The Chechen-Ingush Republic was never fully occupied by the Nazi army, but the repressions were officially justified by "an armed resistance to Soviet power". The charges of the Vainakh collaboration with the Nazis were never subsequently proven in any Soviet court.

During World War II, 3,332,589 individuals were encompassed by Stalin's policies of deportations and forced settlements. Some of the stated reasons were allegedly to "defuse ethnic tensions", to "stabilize the political situation" or to punish people for their "act against the Soviet authority". According to the 1939 census, 407,690 Chechens and 92,074 Ingush were registered in the Soviet Union. On October 13, 1943, Operation Lentil commenced when about a hundred thousand troops and operative workers were moved into Checheno-Ingushetia, supposedly for mending roads and bridges. The soldiers even lived for a month inside the homes of the Chechens, who considered them guests. On February 20, 1944, Beria arrived to Grozny to supervise the operation.

Map of the Chechen and Ingush regions of the Caucasus prior to the deportation

On February 23, 1944 (on Red Army Day), the operation began. The NKVD troops went systematically from house to house to collect individuals. The inhabitants were rounded up and imprisoned in Studebaker US6 trucks, before being packed into unheated and uninsulated freight cars. The people were given only 15 to 30 minutes to pack for the surprise transfer. According to a correspondence dated March 3, 1944, at least 19,000 officers and 100,000 NKVD soldiers from all over the USSR were sent to implement this operation. Some 500 people were deported by mistake even though they were not Chechens or Ingush. The plan envisaged that 300,000 people were to be evicted from the lowland in the first three days, while in the following days the remaining 150,000 people living in the mountain regions would be next in line.

Many times, resistance was met with slaughter, and in one such instance, in the aul of Khaibakh, about 700 people were locked in a barn and burned to death by NKVD General Mikheil Gveshiani, who was praised for this conduct and promised a medal by Beria. Many people from remote villages were executed per Beria's verbal order that any Chechen or Ingush deemed 'untransportable should be liquidated' on the spot. This meant that the old, the ill and the infirm were to either be shot or left to starve in their beds alone. The soldiers would sometimes plunder the empty homes. An eyewitness recalled the actions of the NKVD forces:

They combed the huts to make sure there was no one left behind... The soldier who came into the house did not want to bend down. He raked the hut with a burst from his submachine gun. Blood trickled out from under the bench where a child was hiding. The mother screamed and hurled herself at the soldier. He shot her too. There was not enough rolling stock. Those left behind were shot. The bodies were covered with earth and sand, carelessly. The shooting had also been careless, and people started wriggling out of the sand like worms. The NKVD men spent the whole night shooting them all over again.

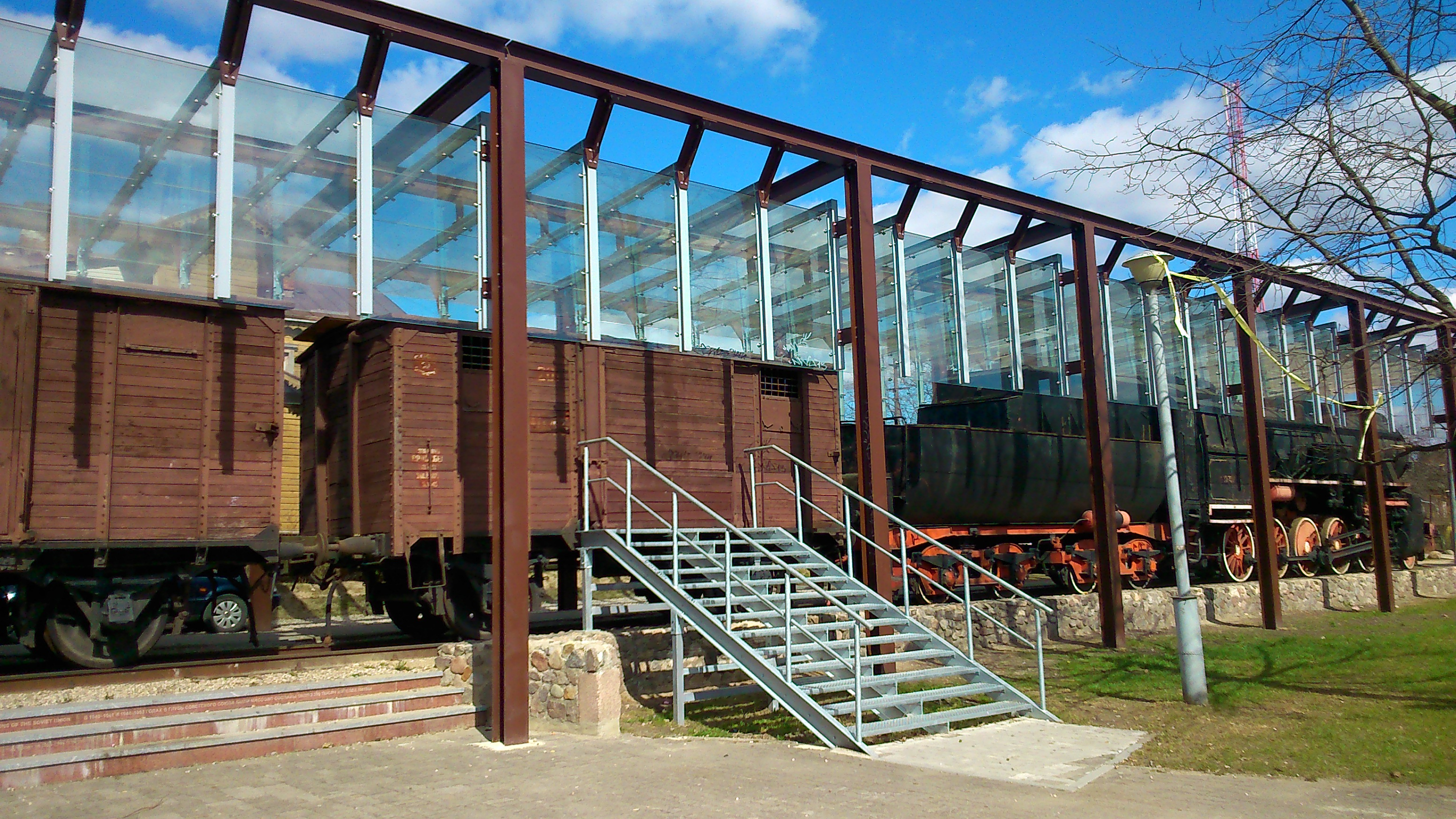
Sealed off freight cars were used to deport the Chechens and Ingush

Those who resisted, protested or walked too slow were shot on the spot. In one incident, NKVD soldiers climbed up Moysty, a high mountain, and found 60 villagers there. Even though their commander ordered the soldiers to shoot the villagers, they fired in the air. The commander then ordered half of the soldiers to join the villagers and another platoon shot them all. 2,016 'anti-Soviet' people were arrested, and 20,072 weapons were confiscated in the operation.

Throughout the North Caucasus, about 650,000 people (according to Dalkhat Ediev, 724,297) were deported in 1943 and 1944 by the Soviet forces. 478,479 people were forcibly resettled in the Aardakh: 387,229 Chechens and 91,250 Ingush. They were loaded onto 180 special trains, about 40 to 45 persons into each freight car. A combined total of 14,200 freight cars and 1,000 flat cars were used for this mass forcible transfer from February 23 to March 13, a rate of almost 350 freight cars per day. Some 40% to 50% of the deportees were children. The Chechens were the second most numerous repressed peoples in the USSR, after the Volga Germans. Tens of thousands of Kalmyks, Balkars, Meskhetian Turks and Karachays were also deported from the region. Only Chechen and Ingush women married to non-punished peoples were spared from the deportation. However, Russian women married to Chechen or Ingush men were subject to deportation unless they divorced. Their livestock was sent to kolkhozes in Ukrainian SSR, Stavropol Krai, Voronezh and Orel Oblasts. Many of these animals perished from exhaustion.

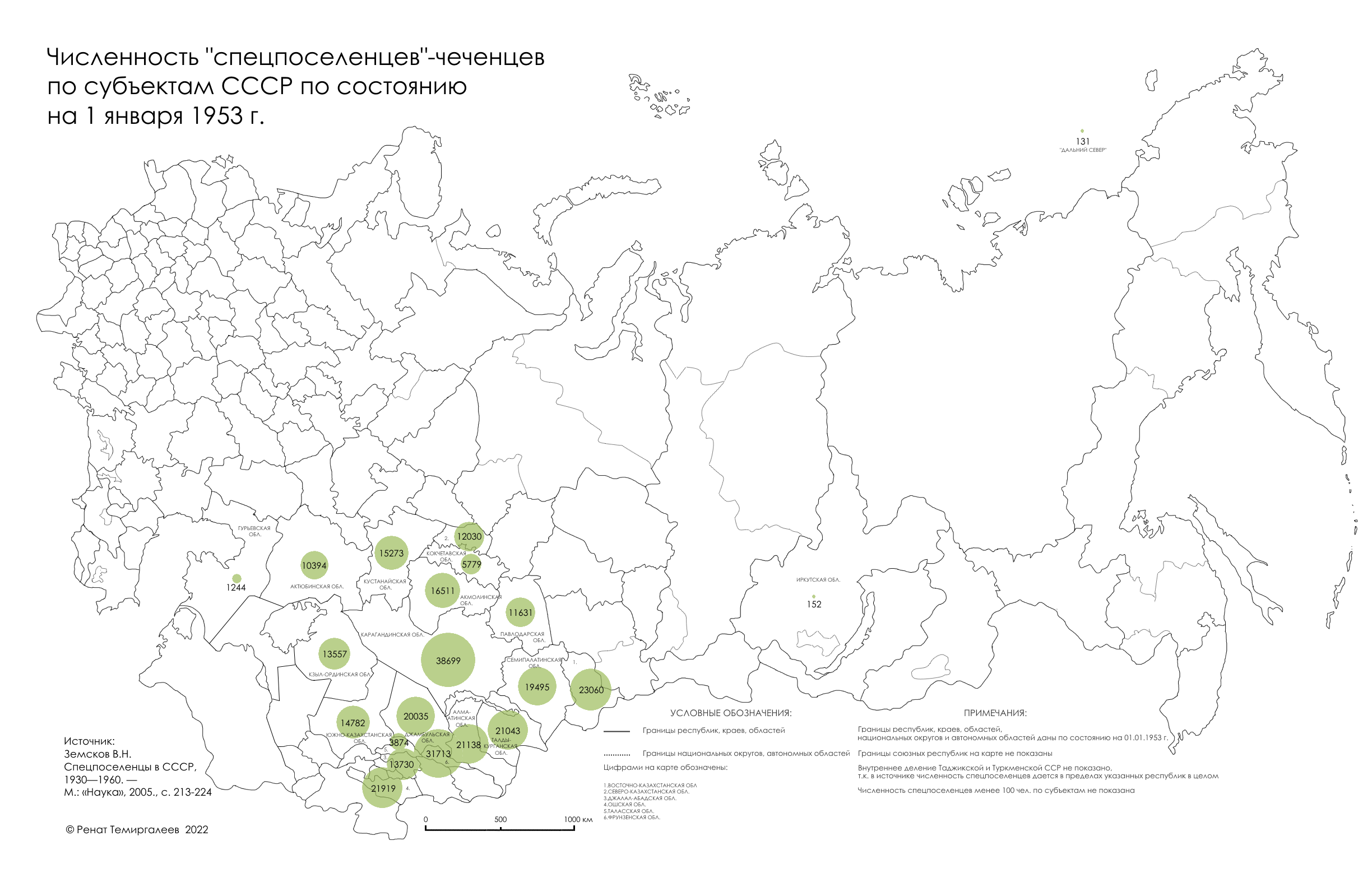
Distribution of resettled Chechens within Soviet Central Asia, 1 January 1953.

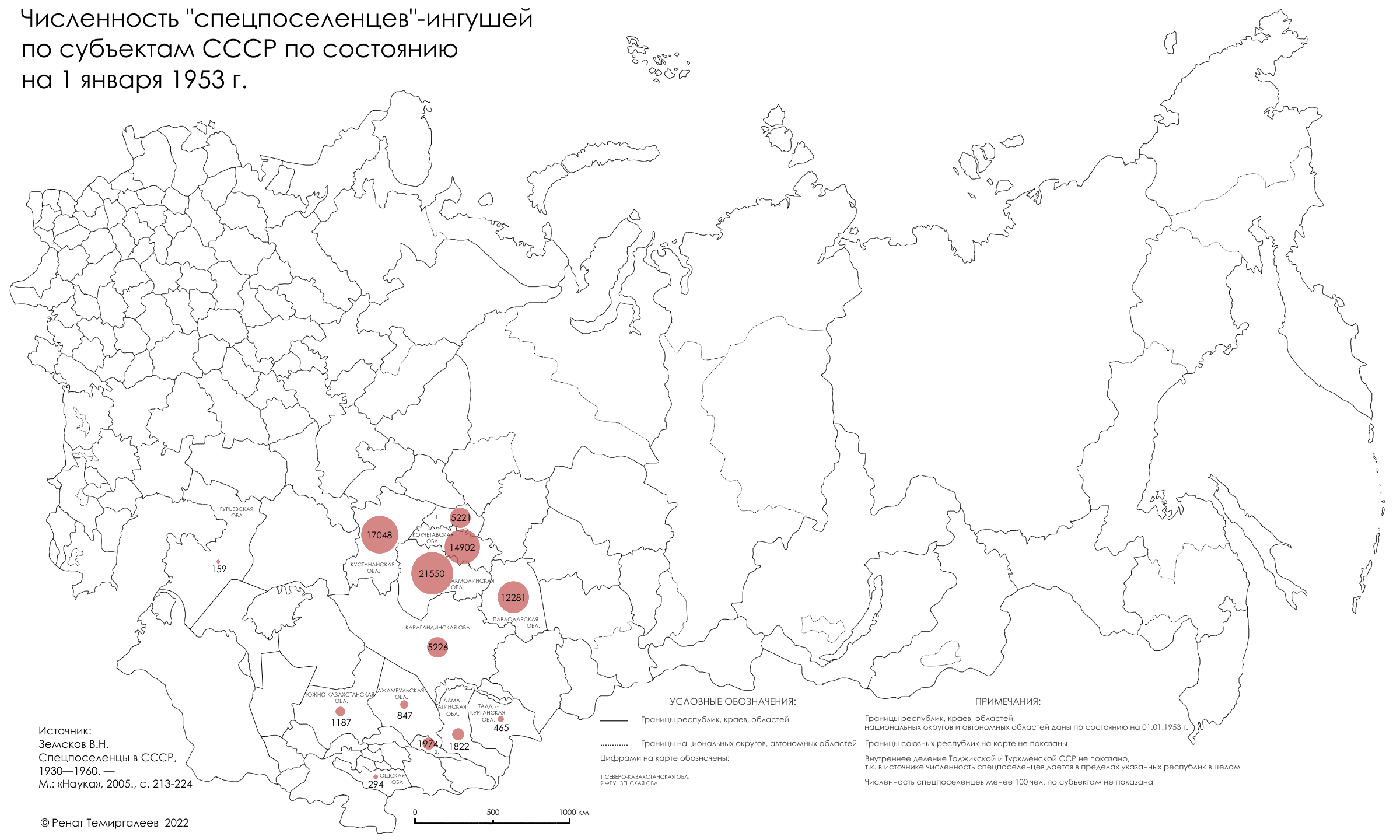
Distribution of resettled Ingush within Soviet Central Asia, 1 January 1953.

Some 6,000 Chechens were stuck in the mountains of the Galanzhoy district due to the snow, but this slowed the deportation only minimally: 333,739 people were evicted, of which 176,950 were sent to trains already on the first day of the operation. Beriya reported that there were only six cases of resistance, 842 were "subject to isolation" while 94,741 were removed from their homes by 11 p.m. on the first day of the operation. Each family was allowed to carry up to 500 kg of personal belongings on the trip. The people were transported in cattle trains that were not appropriate for human transfer, lacking electricity, heating or running water. The exiles inside endured epidemics, which lead to deaths from infections or hunger. The transit to Central Asia lasted for almost a month. Some of the epidemics included typhus. One witness, who was seven years old at the time of her family's deportation, recalls that the wagons were so full of people that there was no space to move inside them. The exiles were given food only sporadically during the transit and did not know where they were being taken to. The wagons did not even stop for bathroom breaks: the passengers had to make holes in the floor to relieve themselves. The special trains traveled almost 2,000 miles and discharged the peoples into desolate areas of Central Asia, devoid of shelters or food. 239,768 Chechens and 78,479 Ingush were sent to the Kazakh SSR, whereas 70,089 Chechens and 2,278 Ingush arrived in Kirgiz SSR. Smaller number of the remaining deportees were sent to Uzbek SSR, Russian SFSR and Tajik SSR.

We had no water and no food. The weak were suffering from hunger, and those who were stronger would get off the train and buy some food. Some people died on the way—no-one in our carriage, but in the next carriage I saw them taking out two corpses... Our baby sister died that night. My dad was looking for a place to bury her—he found a suitable place, dug the grave and buried her... she must have frozen to death.

— Isa Khashiyev, 2014, describing his deportation and arrival at Kokshetau, Kazakhstan

The persecution of the Chechens did not stop there. In May 1944, Beria issued a directive ordering the NKVD to browse the entire USSR in search for any remaining members of that nation, "not leaving a single one". As a result, an additional 4,146 Chechens and Ingush were found in Dagestan, Azerbaijan, Georgia, Krasnodar Krai, Rostov and Astrakhan Oblast. In April 1945, Beria was informed that 2,741 Chechens were deported from the Georgian SSR, 21 from the Azerbaijan SSR and 121 from Krasnodar Krai. In Moscow, only two Chechens managed to avoid eviction. All the Chechen and Ingush were discharged from the Red Army and sent to Central Asia as well. With these supplementary exiles, the number of the deported Chechens and Ingush grew to a total of 493,269. In July 1944, Beria reported an even higher figure to Stalin, claiming that a total of 496,460 Chechen and Ingush were deported. This ethnic cleansing operation was marked by an utter "culture of impunity". Many perpetrators of Operation Lentil were, in fact, even awarded the Suvorov First Class prize for arresting and capturing Chechens and Ingush.

As with eight other "punished peoples" of the Soviet Union, the Chechens were put into the regime of special settlements. There was no barbed wire around their compound, but any Chechen aged 16 or over had to report to the local NKVD officials each month. Those who tried to escape were sent to the gulag. This status of a special settler was supposed to be inherited by the children of the exiles. The exiles were assigned with the heaviest tasks, such as constructing sites, mines and factories in the most inhospitable places. The only compensation they received for their work was food coupons. They would be punished if they would not do any work assigned to them. Local authorities would act harshly towards them: sometimes they would beat the children of the Chechens to death. At Krasnoyarsk about 4,000 Chechens were assigned to forced labor camps. This, combined with malnutrition due to the negligence of the authorities to provide enough food for the newly arrived exiles, led to high death rates. The settlers were not provided with adequate accommodation: on September 1, 1944, only 5,000 out of the 31,000 families in Kirgiz SSR were provided with housing. One district prepared only 18 apartments for 900 families. Some exiles had to live in unheated tents. The Chechen children had to attend school in the local language, not their own. Several cases of rebellion were reported: in Krasnoyarsk in October 1954, some 4,000 Chechens managed to escape from a gulag concentration camp. The Soviet police found and killed half of them, but the other half managed to hide in the vast outdoors.

== Aftermath ==
=== Casualties and death toll ===
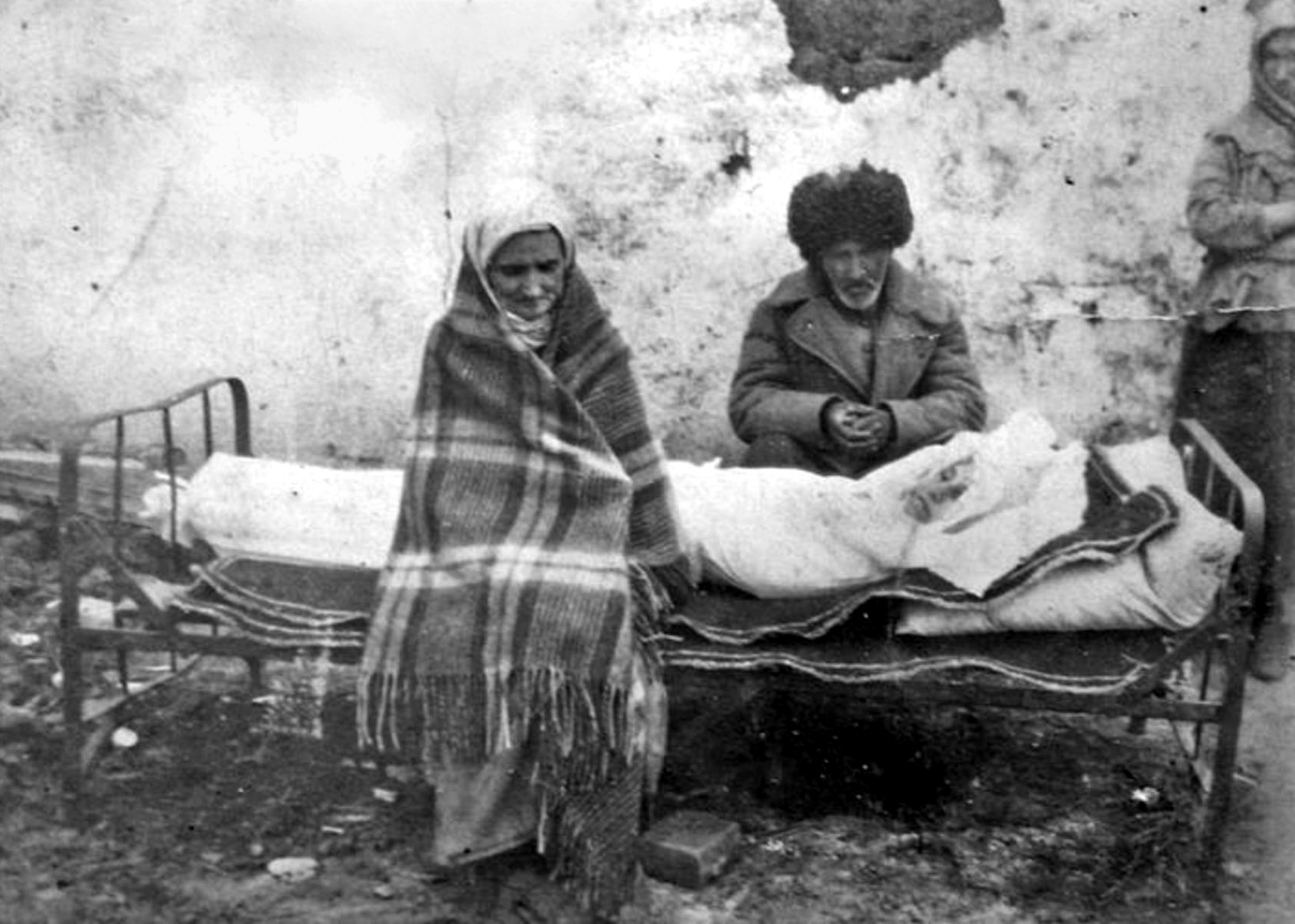
An Ingush family mourning the death of their daughter in Kazakhstan

Many deportees died en route, and the extremely harsh environment of exile, especially considering the amount of exposure to thermal stress, killed many more. The temperatures in the Kazakh SSR would drop anywhere from −50 °C (−58 °F) during winter and then hit up to 50 °C (122 °F) during summer.

They travelled in wagons that were locked from the outside, without light or water, during winter. Trains would stop and open the wagons only occasionally to bury the dead in the snow. The local people at the train stations were forbidden to help the sick passengers or to give them any medicine or water. Some Russian sources claim that 1,272 people died during this transit. In 1948, there were 118,250 special settlers in Kazakh SSR "in extreme need in regard for food" and authorities reported thousands of children dying from undernourishment.

The local authorities in Kyrgyzstan set up enough supplies for only four months. One mother tried to make soup out of grass for her children. According to official Soviet reports, 608,749 Chechen, Ingush, Karachay and Balkars were registered in exile in Central Asia by 1948. The NKVD gives the statistic of 144,704 people who died in 1944–48 alone: a death rate of 23.7% per all these groups. 101,036 Chechens, Ingush and Balkars died in Kazakhstan and 16,052 in Uzbekistan. Another archive record shows that 104,903 of the deported Chechens died by 1949. This means that their group suffered the highest death toll of all the deported peoples within the Soviet Union.

John B. Dunlop argues that population losses of the Chechens during the deportations reached 200,000, however this includes indirect losses of population growth instead of the aggregate of deaths. Professor Jonathan Otto Pohl estimates the combined number of deaths among Chechen and Ingush exiles during transit and confinement in special settlements by 1949 at 123,000. Out of these deaths, Chechens comprised 100,000 and Ingush 23,000. Thomas McDonell also gives a figure of at least 100,000 Chechens who died from starvation and diseases in exile, but does not give a figure for the Ingush casualties. Tom K. Wong, Associate Professor of Political Science, estimates that at least 100,000 Vainakhs died in the first three years in exile, excluding those who perished during the transit and the round-ups. Historian William Flemming released calculations giving a minimum of 132,000 Chechens and Ingush who died between 1944 and 1950. In comparison, their number of births in that period was only 47,000. Thus, the Chechen and ingush population fell from 478,479 in 1944 to 452,737 in 1948. From 1939 to 1959, the Chechen population grew by 2.5%. In comparison, between 1926 and 1939, it grew 28%. Historian Alexander Nekrich stated that the net losses of Chechens between 1939 and 1959 (after allowing for wartime losses) were 131,000, and of Ingush 12,000. German journalist Lutz Kleveman determined that 150,000 people did not survive the first four years of winter cold in Central Asia. Estimates for the maximum deaths and demographic losses of the Chechen and Ingush range from about 170,000 to 200,000, thus ranging from a quarter of the total Chechen population to nearly a third being killed in those years. Chechen historians claim 400,000 perished in deportation and exile; using a presumably higher estimate for the number of deportees.

The demographer Dalkhat Ediev, in a study of casualty figures for all ethnic groups that were singled out for "punishment" by Stalin, found that deaths due to the deportations included 125,500 of the Chechen deportees and 20,300 of the Ingush deportees, or 30.8% of the Chechens and 21.3% of the Ingush. Meanwhile, the short-term demographic losses are estimated at 51.1% for the Chechens and 47.9% for the Ingush. He estimates that the Chechen population dropped to a low of 285,000 and the Ingush to 78,800 people in October 1948. However, despite these heavy losses, the Chechens subsequently increased their fertility rates, which is seen by some as a manifestation of their resilience and determination to survive.

=== Political, cultural, social and economic consequences ===
The Checheno-Ingush ASSR was dissolved and transformed into Grozny Oblast, which included also the Kizlyarsky District and Naursky Raion, and parts of it were given to North Ossetia (part of Prigorodny District), Georgian SSR and Dagestan ASSR. As a result, Georgian SSR "grew" from 69,300 to 76,400, North Ossetiya from 6,200 to 9,200 and Dagestan from 35,000 to 38,200 square kilometers. Names of repressed nations were totally erased from all books and encyclopedias. By the next summer, a number of Chechen and Ingush placenames were replaced with Russian ones; mosques were destroyed, and a massive campaign of burning numerous historical Nakh languages books and manuscripts was near complete. Their villages were razed to the ground and their graveyards bulldozed. With the native population gone, the Chechen region experienced a huge lack of skilled workers: the local oil production industry dropped more than ten times in 1944 compared to 1943.

On November 26, 1948, the Presidium of the USSR Supreme Soviet issued a decree which sentenced the deported nations to a permanent exile in those distant regions. This decree was not only mandatory for Chechens and Ingush, but also for Crimean Tatars, Germans, Balkars and Kalmyks. The settlers were not allowed to travel beyond three kilometers of their new place of residence. The authorities also prohibited any public mention or documentation of the deportations and its murders. A great number of historical Vainakh manuscripts were burned or carried off by Russians. The settlers were the target of various provocations in the Kazakh SSR: in December 1954, students in Elizavetinka taunted the Chechens as "traitors and betrayers of motherland". In May 1955, a worker in a coal mine engaged in a fight with a Chechen colleague in Ekibastuz. This escalated into a pogrom in which Russian hooligans even attacked a police station which sheltered the runaway Chechens. Many refugees from the Soviet Union were moved to the empty homes, including Russians, Ukrainians, Avars and Ossetians. As a consequence of this, the Russians comprised 49% of the Chechen-Ingush ASSR by 1959. By one report dated April 8, 1957, there were 415,000 Chechen and Ingush living in the Kazakh and Kyrgyz SSR, or 90,000 families. 38,500 were employed in the industry, 91,500 in agriculture, 25,000 in offices.

=== Return ===
Return of Chechens and Ingush to their homeland

In 1953, the three architects of the deportation perished: shortly after Stalin died on 5 March, Beria and Kobulov were arrested on 27 June 1953. They were convicted on multiple charges, sentenced to death and executed on 23 December 1953. However, these charges were unrelated to the crimes of deportations and were merely a ploy to remove them from power. Nikita Khrushchev became the new Soviet leader and revoked numerous deportations, even denouncing Stalin. In his secret speech on 24 February 1956, Khrushchev condemned these Stalinist deportations:

The Soviet Union is justly considered as a model of a multinational state because we have in practice assured the equality and friendship of all nations who live in our great fatherland. All the more monstrous are the acts whose initiator was Stalin and which are crude violations of basic Leninist principles of the nationality policy of the Soviet State. We refer to the mass deportations from their native places of whole nations, together with Communists and Komsomols without exception.

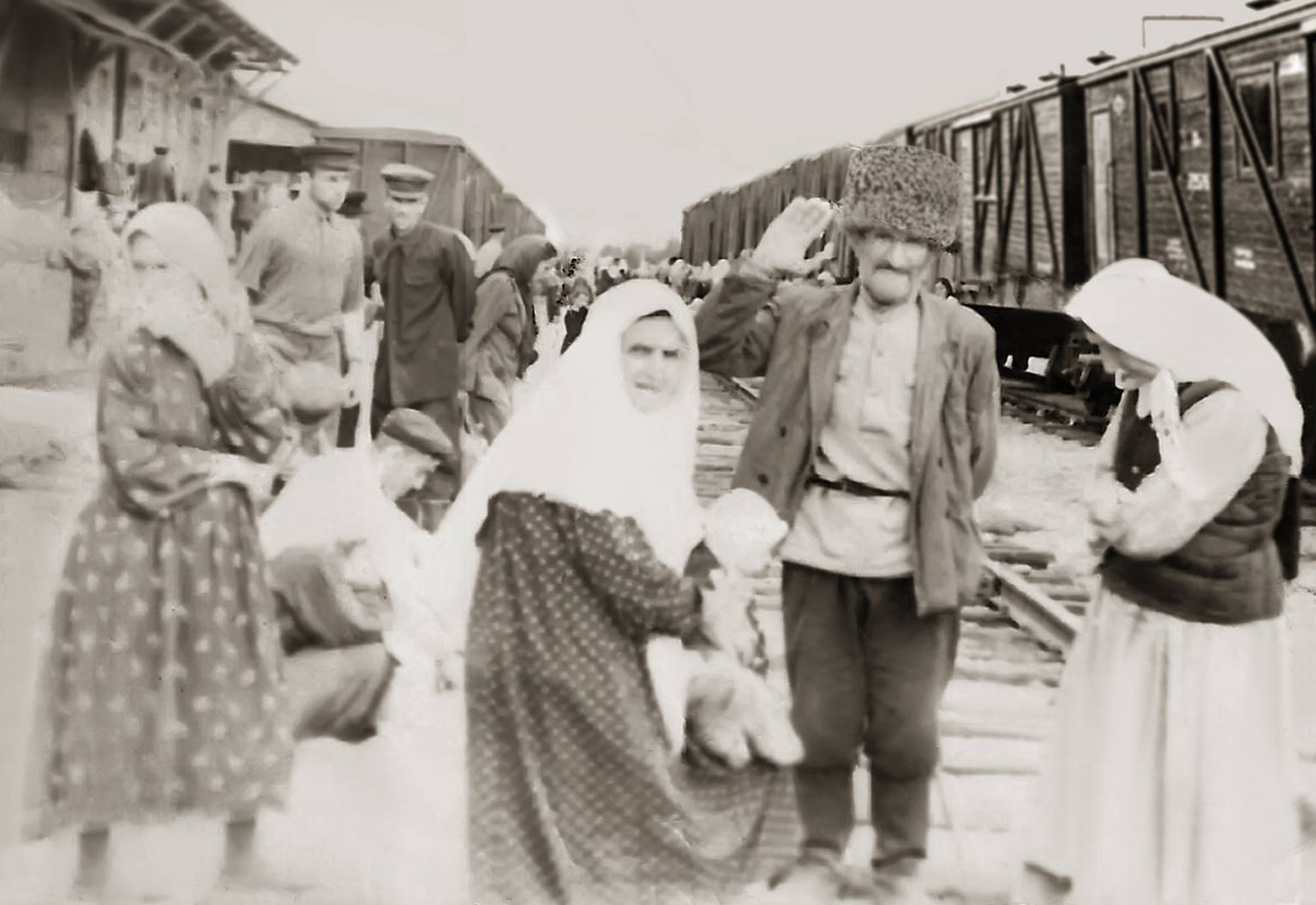
Chechen residents of the village of Yurt-Auh, awaiting return to their homes at a railway station in Bishkek, 1957

On 16 July 1956 the Presidium of the USSR Supreme Soviet adopted a decree lifting the restrictions of the legal status of Chechens, Ingush and Karachais in the special settlements. In January 1957, the Soviet Council of Ministers passed a decree allowing repressed nations to freely travel in the Soviet Union. The Chechens and Ingush were thereby rehabilitated. Their exile lasted 13 years. Some started slowly returning to the Caucasus already in 1954, but were sent back by the authorities. During 1956 alone, between 25,000 and 30,000 Chechens and Ingush returned to their homeland, some even carrying the bodies of their relatives. The Soviet government tried to give them autonomy inside Uzbekistan or to resettle them in other parts of the Caucasus, but the returnees were adamant to return to their native lands.

Over 50,000 families returned in 1957. By 1959, Chechens and Ingush already comprised 41% of the Chechen-Ingush ASSR. 58.2% of Chechens and 45.3% of Ingushetians returned to their native lands by that year. By 1970, this peaked with 83.0% of all Chechens and 72.1% of all Ingush being registered in the Chechen-Ingush ASSR. However, this distribution fell to 76.8% and 69.0%, respectively, by 1989. In comparison, 91.9% of all Chechens and 91.9% of all Ingush were concentrated in their titular republic in 1926. However, some Chechens stayed in Kyrgyzstan: some were afraid of the harsh long trip, some lacked the money to travel. By 2010, there were still 100,000 Chechens living in Kazakhstan.

When the Chechens and Ingush returned to their homeland, they found their farms and infrastructure had deteriorated. Some of the mountain regions were still a restricted zone for the returnees, which meant they had to settle in the lowlands. Worse still, they found other peoples living in their homes, and viewed these other ethnicities (Ossetians, Russians, Laks, and Avars) with hostility. Some Laks, Darghins and Avars had to be moved back to Dagestan, where they came from. Conflicts between Ossetians and Ingush in Prigorodny were sparked. The massive numbers of Vainakhs who were coming back to the Northern Caucasus took the locals by surprise: the Soviet government thus decided to temporarily halt the influx of returnees in the summer of 1957. Many Chechens and Ingush sold their homes and belongings, and quit their jobs to be able to return. A renewed ethnic conflict between Chechens and Russians was also on the rise. The Russians, angered by issues over land ownership and job competition, rioted as early as 1958. The 1958 riot was sparked by a fight between a Russian sailor and an Ingush youngster over a girl in which the Russian was fatally injured. In the next four days, the Russians formed mob riots and looted the Vainakh property, seizing government buildings and demanding either a restoration of Grozny Oblast, or a creation of a non-titular autonomy, re-deportation of the Chechens and Ingush, establishment of "Russian power", mass search and disarming of Chechens and Ingush, before Soviet law enforcement dispersed the rioters. Although the riot was dispersed and denounced as "chauvinistic", afterward the republican government made special efforts to please the Russian populace, including mass discrimination against the Chechens aimed at preserving the privileged position of the Russians.

Map of the Chechen-Ingush ASSR from 1957 to 1991

In 1958, the Chechen-Ingush ASSR was officially restored by a decree direct from Moscow, but in previous 1936 borders. North Ossetia kept the Psedakh and Prigorodny District, Georgian SSR kept the Darial Gorge, amounting to 1/6 of lost land for Ingushetia, while the Chechen-Ingush ASSR was "compensated" with the Itum-Kalinsky and Prigorodny Districts from the Georgian SSR. This was done to dissipate the demographic impact of the 419,000 Vainakh returnees on Russians who moved there. By 1989, the 750,000 Chechens already comprised a majority (55%) of the Chechen-Ingush ASSR, while 300,000 Russians comprised 22% and 163,700 Ingush 12% of the population. Chechens started to gain control by the 1970s. Ultimately, the attempt to make Checheno-Ingushetia more multi-ethnic in order to discourage potential uprisings failed due to the higher birthrate of the Vainakhs.

A local report from 1961 indicated that out of 524,000 Vainakhs, 432,000 had resettled to the Chechen-Ingush ASSR, 28,000 to Dagestan and 8,000 to North Ossetia. However, ethnic clashes continued even in the 1960s: in 1965 alone, 16 such clashes were recorded, resulting in 185 injuries and 19 fatalities. Chechens were greatly disadvantaged after being allowed to return. There were no Chechen-language schools, leading to a lack of education of the populace (which did not universally understand Russian). According to sociologist Georgi Derluguyan, the Checheno-Ingush Republic's economy was divided into two spheres, in which the Russian sphere had all the jobs with higher salaries in the urban areas: no Chechen cadre was promoted to a top position until 1989. In the 1960s, in order to finance their families, some forty thousand men temporarily migrated from Chechen-Ingushetia each year to find part-time jobs in Kazakhstan and Siberia, thanks to their contacts from the time of their exile. On paper, the Chechen-Ingush Republic enjoyed the same privileges as other Soviet ASSRs, but in reality it had very little actual Chechens or Ingush representing its government, which was run directly by the Russians. Despite being rich with oil, the Chechen-Ingush ASSR remained the second poorest region of the entire USSR. Yusup Soslambekov, a chairman of the Chechen parliament after 1991, lamented that his people returned from exile to their homes "not as masters of that land but as mere inhabitants, tenants. Other people took our jobs in our factories".

== Remembrance and legacy ==
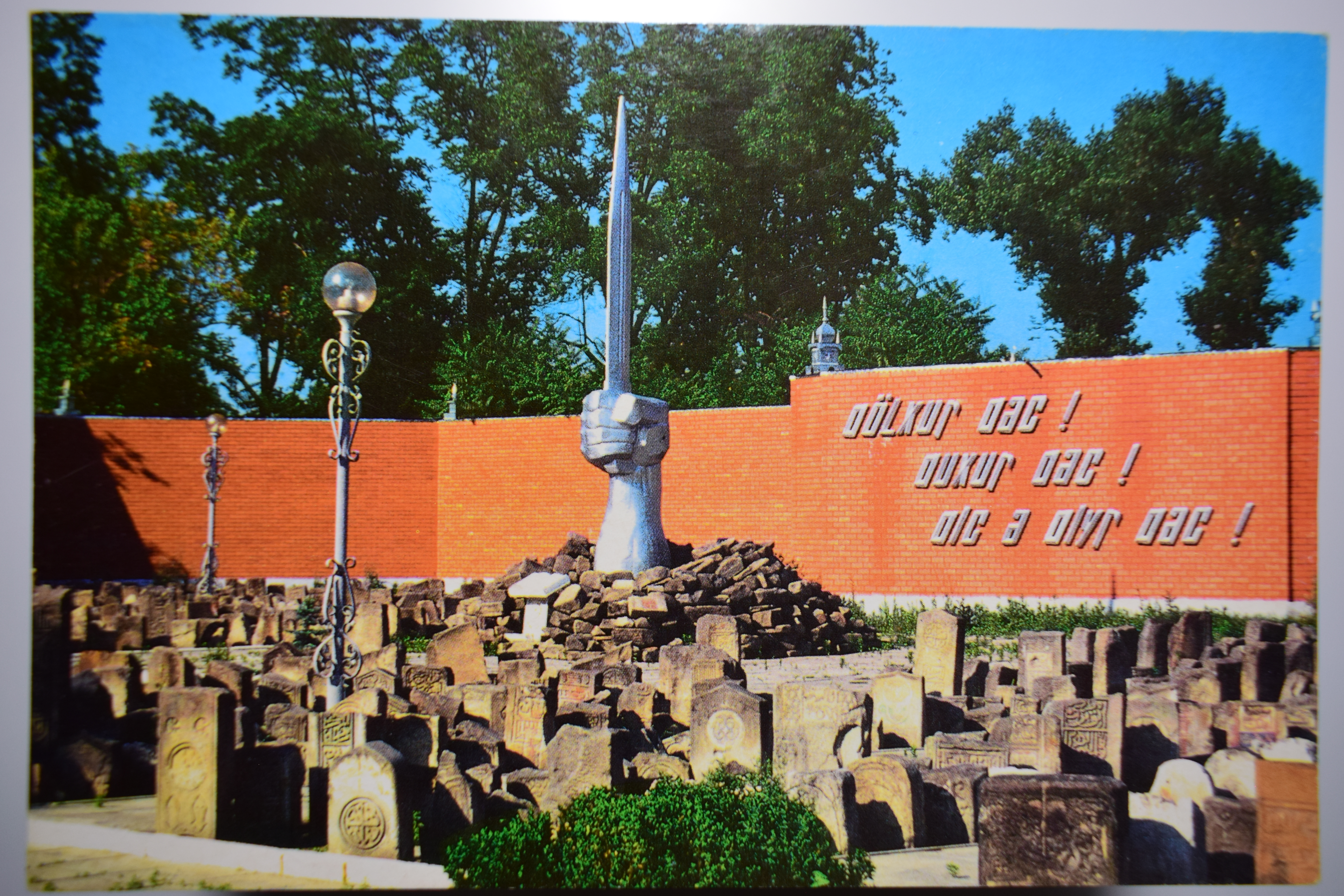
Postcard with the image of the Memorial to the Victims of the Deportation of 1944. The inscription on the wall means: "We will not weep! We will not break! We will not forget!" The memorial was demolished in 2014.

The deportation left a permanent scar in the memory of the Chechens and Ingush is today regarded by some historians as "one of the most significant ethnic traumas of the Soviet period". Some descendants of the peoples of the North Caucasus are even today in fear of a new deportation. One historian named it "the central defining event in modern Chechen and Ingush history". It also played a role in the Chechen and Ingush mistrust at the Kremlin and a partial motivation for the subsequent declaration of independence in 1991 and the First and Second Chechen War in the 1990s and 2000s. For instance, insurgent Shamil Basayev referred to his 40 relatives who died during the deportation while Aslan Maskhadov, the President of Ichkeria, stated that February 23 remains "one of the most tragic dates for his people" and that the goal of the Russian government has always stayed the same: "Chechnya without Chechens". Historian Nikolay Bugay described the deportation as a "perversion of Lenin's national policy and a direct disregard for the constitutional rights of the peoples".

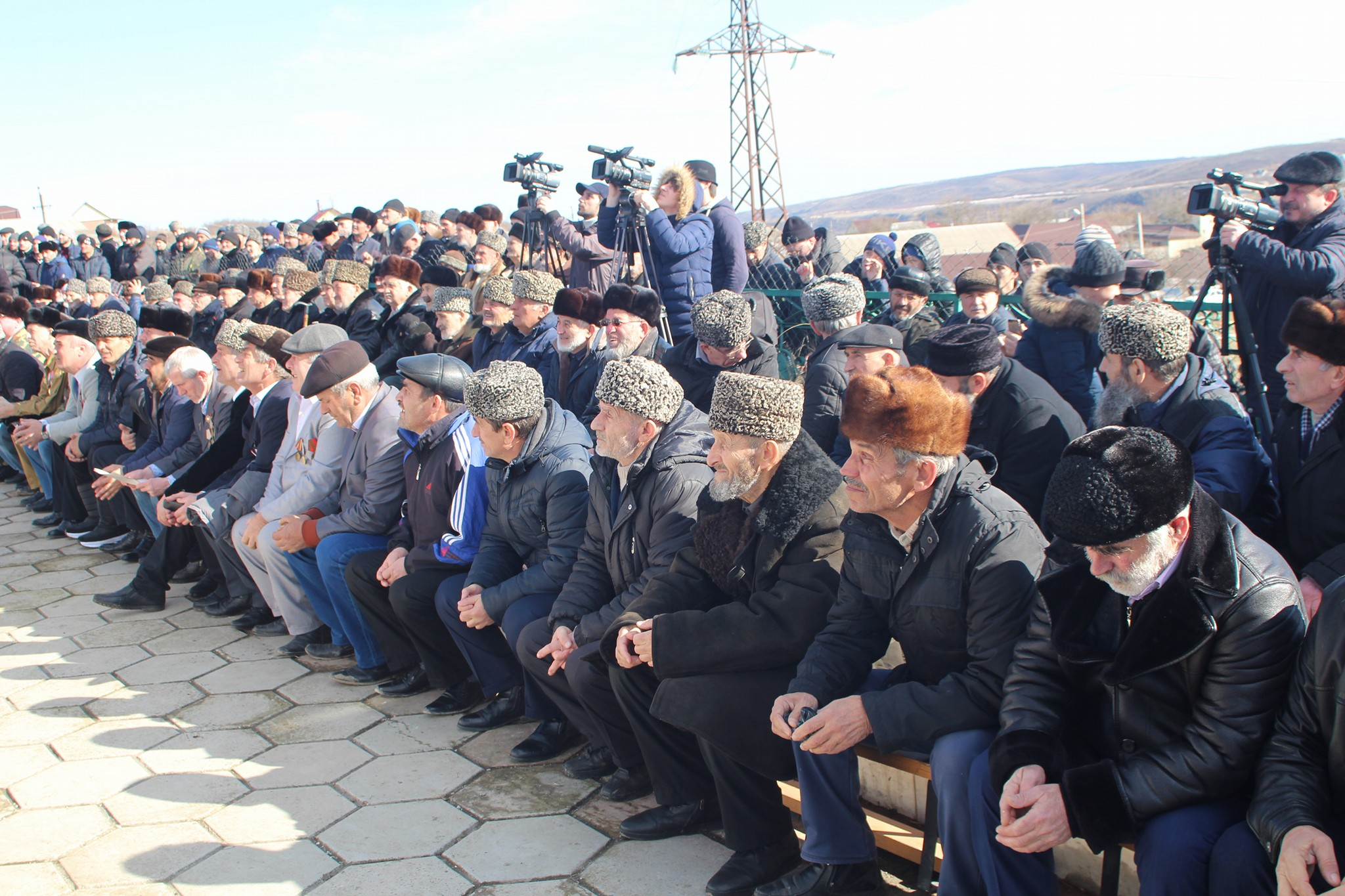
Meeting in Aukh on February 23, 2017 dedicated to the anniversary of deportation

In 1991, Chechen President Dzhokhar Dudayev made political capital by, in a symbolic move, sending out officials to gather these lost gravestones (that had been used by the Soviets for the construction of pedestrian footpasses and foundations of pig pens), many of which had lost their original inscriptions, and to construct out of them a memorial in the center of Grozny. The memorial was made to symbolize both Chechen remorse for the past as well as the desire to, in the name of the dead ancestors, fashion the best possible Chechen Republic out of their land and work hard towards the future. It bears an engravement, reading: "We will not break, we will not weep; we will never forget." Tablets bore pictures of the sites of massacres, such as Khaibakh. The memorial was damaged during the subsequent Russo-Chechen wars. It has been later moved and dismantled by Ramzan Kadyrov's pro-Russian government, sparking much controversy.

=== Genocide question ===
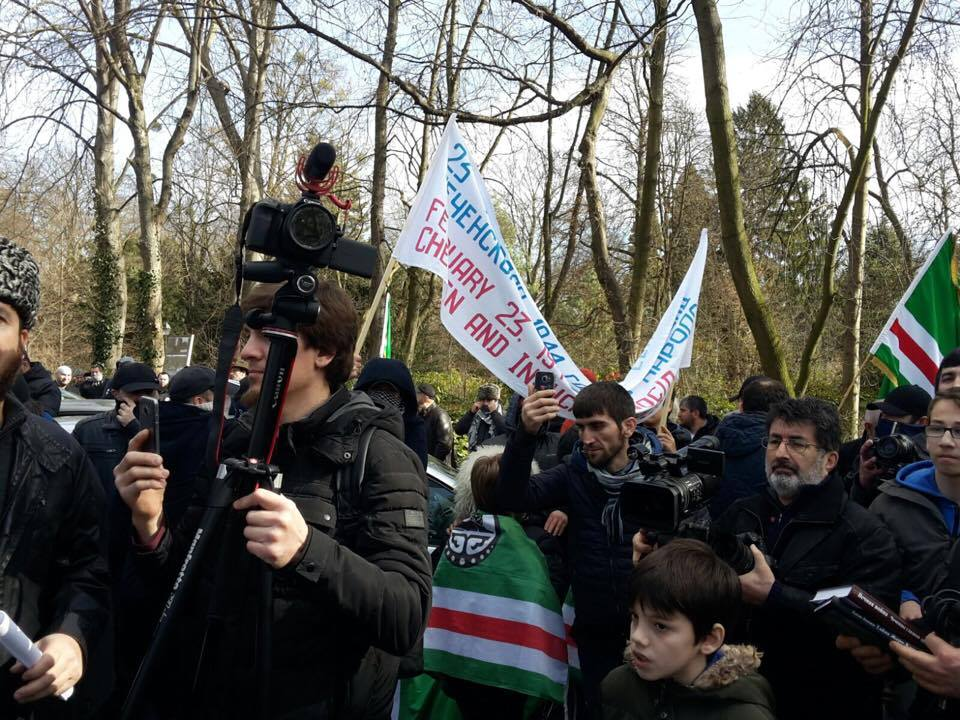
Meeting in Strasbourg on 23 February 2017 dedicated to the anniversary of deportation

The forced relocation, slaughter, and conditions during and after transfer have been described as an act of genocide by various scholars as well as the European Parliament on the basis of the IV Hague Convention of 1907 and the Convention on the Prevention and Punishment of the Crime of Genocide of the U.N. General Assembly (adopted in 1948), including French historian and expert on communist studies Nicolas Werth, German historian Philipp Ther, Professor Anthony James Joes, American journalist Eric Margolis, Canadian political scientist Adam Jones, professor of Islamic History at the University of Massachusetts Dartmouth Brian Glyn Williams, scholars Michael Fredholm and Fanny E. Bryan. Raphael Lemkin, a lawyer of Polish-Jewish descent who initiated the Genocide Convention, assumed that genocide was perpetrated in the context of the mass deportation of the Chechens, Ingush, Volga Germans, Crimean Tatars, Kalmyks and Karachay. German investigative journalist Lutz Kleveman compared the deportation to a "slow genocide". In this case this was acknowledged by the European Parliament as an act of genocide in 2004:

...Believes that the deportation of the entire Chechen people to Central Asia on 23 February 1944 on the orders of Stalin constitutes an act of genocide within the meaning of the Fourth Hague Convention of 1907 and the Convention for the Prevention and Repression of the Crime of Genocide adopted by the UN General Assembly on 9 December 1948.

On 26 April 1991 the Supreme Soviet of the Russian Socialist Federal Soviet Republic, under its chairman Boris Yeltsin, passed the law On the Rehabilitation of Repressed Peoples with Article 2 denouncing all mass deportations as "Stalin's policy of defamation and genocide." Experts of the United States Holocaust Memorial Museum cited the events of 1944 for a reason of placing Chechnya on their genocide watch list for its potential for genocide. The separatist government of Chechnya also recognized it as genocide. Members of the Chechen diaspora and their supporters promote 23 February as World Chechnya Day to commemorate the victims.

The Chechens and Ingush, along with the Karachai and Balkars, are represented in the Confederation of Repressed Peoples (CRP), an organization that covers the former Soviet Union and aims to support and rehabilitate the rights of the deported peoples.

=== In popular culture ===
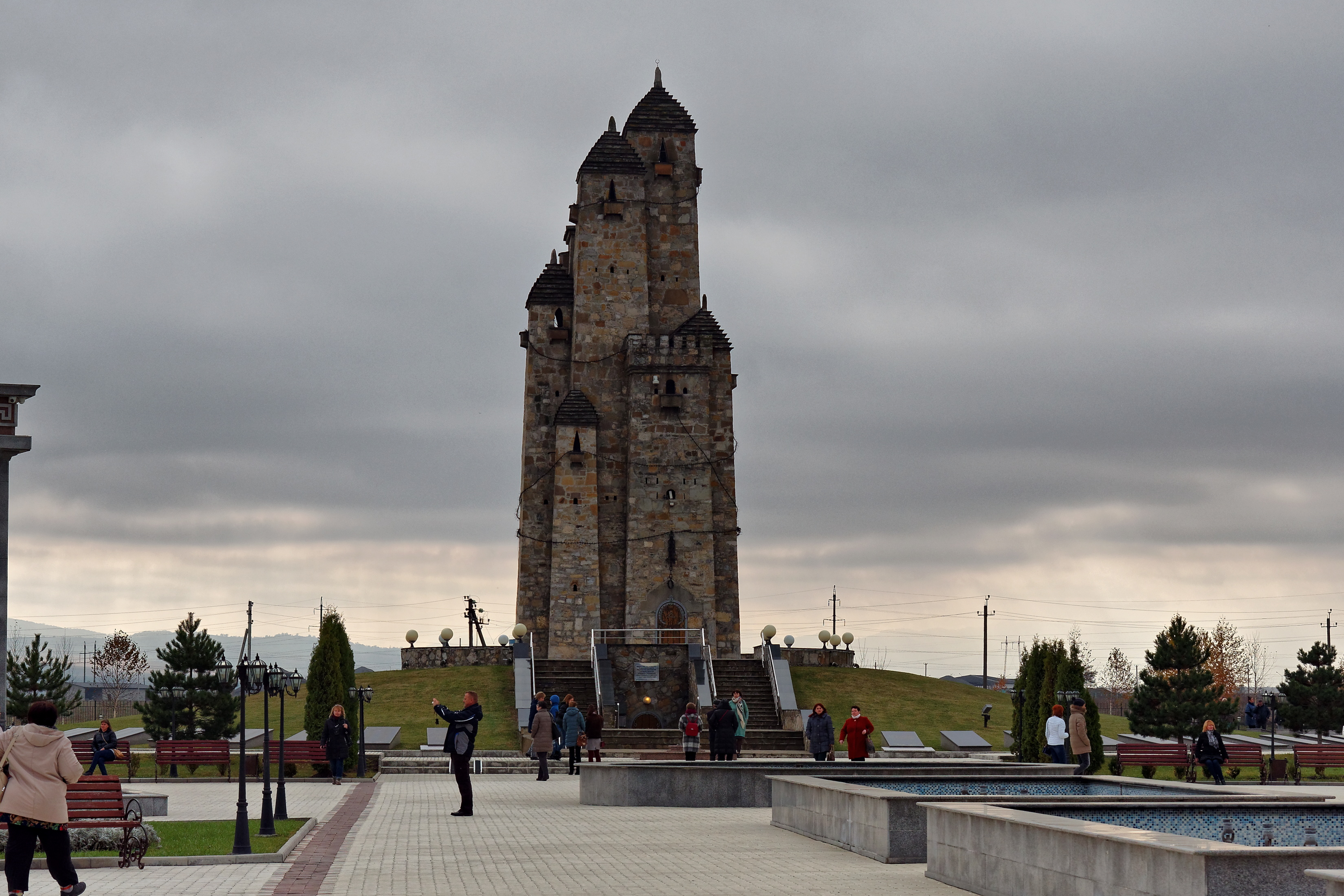
Memorial "9 towers" in Nazran (Ingushetia) built in memory of deportation

Aleksandr Solzhenitsyn's documentary history The Gulag Archipelago, published in 1973, mentioned the Chechens: "They are a nation that refused to accept the psychology of submission... I never saw a Chechen seek to serve the authorities, or even to please them".

In 1977 Vladimir Vysotsky wrote the song Летела жизнь (Letela zhizn) devoted to the deportation.

Anatoly Pristavkin wrote the 1987 novel The Inseparable Twins which deals with this deportation. Semyon Lipkin published the novel Dekada in 1983. Iunus Desheriev, a philologist of Chechen origin, published an autobiography about how he escaped the fate of his people thanks to assistance from Russian friends.

On 19 February 1989, the Yaryksu-Auch village built a monument to the victims of Stalinism.

The deportation of the Ingush, as well as the struggle of contemporary Ingush rebels, features in the 1995 novel Our Game by John le Carré. There is a description by one of the protagonists about the deportation, specifically to the Kazakh steppes.

On 23 February 1997, the 9 towers memorial was unveiled in Nazran, devoted to the deportation.

The Chechen-Russian film Ordered to Forget by Hussein Erkenov was released in 2014 and depicts the 1944 Khaibakh massacre of the Chechens.

== See also ==
- 1951 anti-Chechen pogrom in Kazakhstan
- 1958 Grozny riots
- Circassian genocide
- Khaibakh massacre
- Deportation of the Crimean Tatars
- Deportation of the Kalmyks
- List of genocides
- Ingush nationalism
- Recognition of crimes against the Ingush people
