= Natalia Gvishiani =

Russian linguist and scholar

- Born: 29 June 1949 (age 77); Moscow, Russia
- Education: Moscow State University (Master's degree, PhD)
- Occupations: Linguist; Professor; Scholar
- Spouse: Alexei Gvishiani
- Children: Ekaterina Semenikhin
- Writing career
- Language: Russian; English
- Subjects: Philology; Terminology
- Notable works: Terminology Science in Russia today, Reflecting on Language and Language learning
- Notable awards: Distinguished Professor Moscow State University (20 December 2010), FIPLV award (2008)

Natalia Gvishiani is a Russian linguist, professor, scholar and academic. She totals more than 110 publications on Terminology and Philology. In 2010, Moscow State University made her a Distinguished professor.

== Professional and literary life ==
Natalia Gvishiani was born on 29 June 1949, in Moscow, Russian Federation where she ultimately graduated from high school with a silver medal. After high school, she went on to study at the Moscow State University with a major in German Studies, followed by some brief work at the State Committee for Television and Radio. Since 1972, she has been working at the Department of English, Linguistics, Faculty of Philology of Moscow State University. She has occupied the position of lecturer, senior lecturer, associate professor, and now professor since 1988. She defended her first thesis on Multifunctional word as the subject of grammar and phraseology and later on her doctoral thesis 'categories and concepts of linguistics as a subject of methodological research' in the field of 'General Linguistics' and 'German philology'. She then took fellowships at the University of Buffalo New York (USA) under P.Gavin and then in 1979 and 1986 at the University Of London (UCL) under S.Quirke.

She is also the first president and founder of the International Linguistics Association of Teachers of English Language (LATEUM). From 1973 to 1998, she participated on a yearly basis, to the IATEFL conferences and is, as of 1997, a member of the International Association of Linguists focused on the research on computerized archives of the English language. In 2008, she was awarded a medal by the International Federation Association of Current Languages (FIPLV) for her contribution to international cooperation. She has been a member of the Board of the Edinbrough-based international journal Corpora. She has also participated in the creation of the ICLE textbook for English as a foreign language. On 20 December 2010, by decision of the Academic Council, Gvishiani was made a 'Distinguished professor of the University of Moscow'.

== Bibliography ==
Gvishiani has more than 110 publications of which the following are among the most notable ones:

=== Textbooks ===
- "Terminology in the Learning of the English Language" (Терминология в обучении английскому языку (с глоссарием лингвистических терминов)) (1997)
- "Contemporary English Language, Lexicology" (Современный английский язык. Лексикология) (2001)
- "Introduction to contrasting lexicology" (Введение в контрастивную лексикологию (англо-русские межъязыковые соответствия)) (2010)
- "The Language of Scientific communications" (Язык научного общения (вопросы методологии)) (2008)
- "Practice of Linguistics" (Практикум по корпусной лингвистике) (2008)
- "Polyfunctional words in speech" (Полифункциональные слова в языке и речи) (1993)

=== Doctoral Works ===
- "Conceptual Metaphors in the American Language" (Концептуальные метафоры в американском варианте английского языка: структура и вариативность)
- "Mid-Language lexical correlations in the first idiom and analysis" (Межъязыковые лексические соответствия в сопоставительном анализе и переводе идиом)
- "Genred diversity and functional/stylistic differences in television broadcasting" (Жанровые разновидности и функционально-стилистические особенности языка телевизионного вещания)
- "Attributs in syntax in translation from Russian to English" (Атрибутивные словосочетания в переводе с русского языка на английский (корпусное исследование))
- "Metaphors and metaphorical meaning in Foster's work" (Метафора и метафорическое значение слова в произведениях Э. М. Форстера)
- "Suffixes of Roman origin in the structure of the English Language" (Суффиксы романского происхождения в структуре английских производных слов и их переводные эквиваленты в русском и испанском языках)
- "Particularities of the translation of Neologisms in Anti-utopian works of G.Orwell" (Особенности перевода неологизмов в произведениях жанра антиутопии (в сопоставлении переводов романа Дж. Оруэлла „1984“ на русский и шведский языки)
- "Lexical Stratification in compiling English and Russian texts on sports " (Лексическая стратификация в сопоставлении английских и русских текстов спортивной тематики)
