= Vladimir Semenikhin =

Russian businessman and art collector

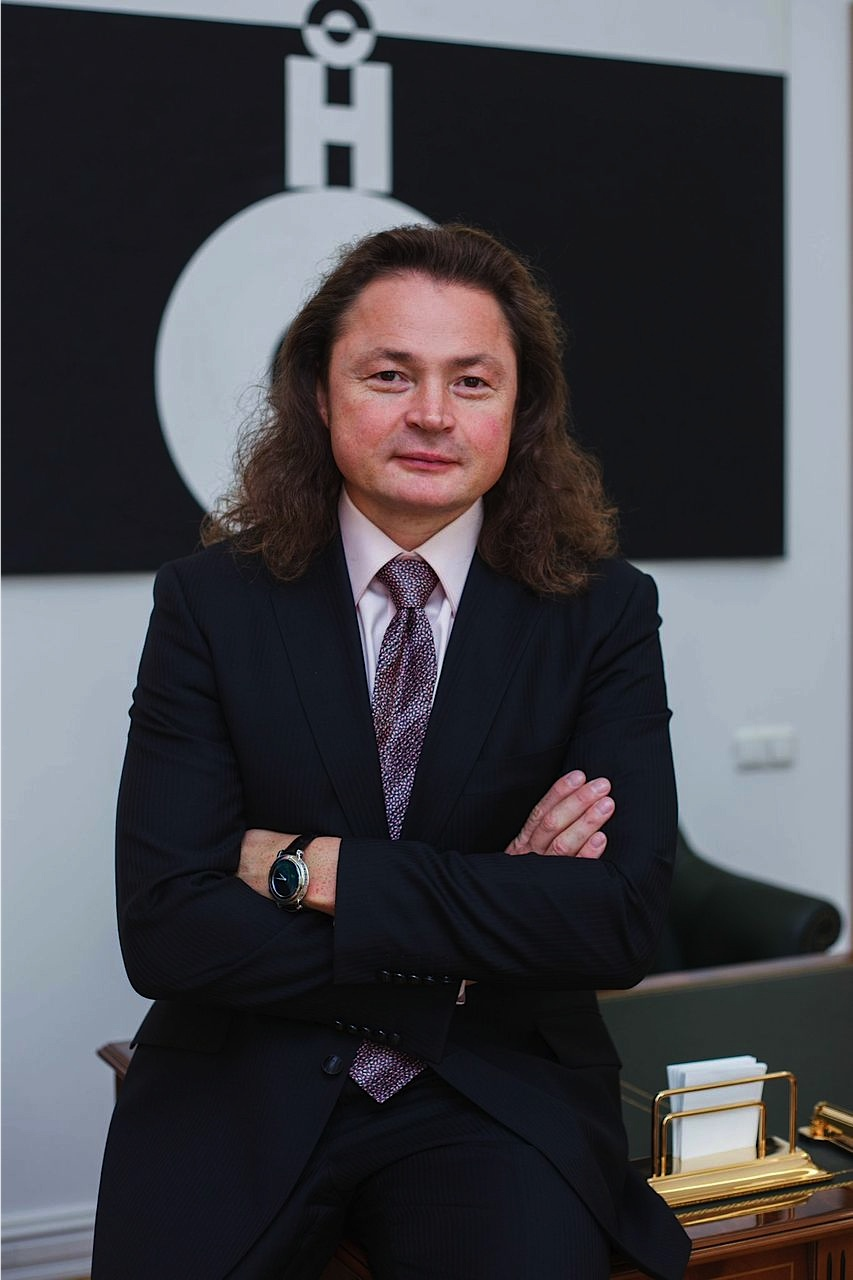
- Born: Vladimir Anatolievich Semenikhin; August 31, 1967 (age 58); Petrovsk Zabaikalsky, Chita region, USSR
- Education: МИСИ/Moscow State University of Civil Engineering
- Occupations: Chairman of the board of directors at Stroyteks Group; President of the Ekaterina Cultural Foundation; Honorary Consul of Kazakhstan in Monaco
- Spouse: Ekaterina Semenikhin
- Children: Dimitri Semenikhin; Annabelle Semenikhin

Vladimir Anatolievich Semenikhin (born August 31, 1967) is a Russian businessman, philanthropist and art collector. He is president of the Ekaterina Cultural Foundation and chairman of the Stroyteks Group’s board of directors. He is the owner of one of the largest private art collections.

== Education ==
Semenikhin graduated from the Faculty of Civil Engineering at the Kuybyshev Moscow Institute of Civil Engineering (now the Moscow State University of Civil Engineering).

== Cultural Influence ==
In 2002, Semenikhin and his wife created the Ekaterina Cultural Foundation to promote the arts in Russia. Through it he has supported exhibitions at state museums and galleries. The foundation has held international exhibitions such as the Knave of Diamonds avant-garde exhibition at the Russian Museum in St. Petersburg in 2004 and the Tretyakov Gallery in Moscow in 2005.

In 2007, Semenikhin opened one of the first private exhibition halls in the center of Moscow. A number of shows have been hosted there, such as the Grace Kelly exhibition in 2008. By 2024, the Ekaterina Foundation had published more than 20 art albums, catalogs, and other publications. It has been involved in publishing activities since 2004.

Semenikhin is also considered one of Russia's leading art collectors and is believed to hold one of the largest private art collections. The family collection includes paintings from the 18th-19th centuries and avant-garde and contemporary art. Part of the collection is housed in a private apartment. As of 2024, the collection contains approximately 1,500 paintings, as well as sculptures, installations, 19th-20th century porcelain, folk craft items – particularly from Palekh (a series of fairy tale-themed works was commissioned by Semenikhin) – and an artistic collection of Murano glass.

Semenikhin has encouraged the development of the arts in Russia by hosting exhibitions of Russian painters from the avant-garde movement.

== Consular appointment ==
From June 15, 2011, Semenikhin served as Honorary Consul of Kazakhstan (a volunteer, non-governmental position) in the Principality of Monaco. He organized state visits to Kazakhstan and Monaco (2013, 2014) involving both heads of state.

In November 2024, he stepped away from this role.

== Business accomplishments ==
In 1995, Semenikhin founded the Stroyteks (Стройтэкс) construction company in Moscow. By 2024, its portfolio included more than 1.5 million square meters (according to information from the company’s website).

As of 2024, Semenikhin is the chairman of the board of directors.

== Awards ==
- Knight of the Order of Saint-Charles (2018)
- "For Beneficence" decoration (July 18, 2018, Russia) — for fruitful efforts in fostering cultural exchange and mutual enrichment between nations and peoples
- Officer of the French Legion of Honor (2017)
- Knight of the French Legion of Honor (2013)
- Monegasque award for Cultural achievement (2011)
- "Innovation" Award for Supporting Contemporary Art in Russia (2006)

== Board affiliations ==
- Member of the Board of the Kosygin Prize association
- Member of the board of the Oceanographic Museum of Monaco
- Member of the Monegasque Attractiveness committee
- Member of the board of trustees of the Multimedia Art Museum

== Family ==
His father was a veterinarian who specialized in dangerous diseases (anthrax, Ebola).

His mother was a microbiologist.
