= Mikhail Gvishiani =

NKVD Colonel responsible for Khaibakh massacre

Mikhail Maksimovich Gvishiani
- მიხეილ გვიშიანი
- Born: 6 January 1905; Abastumani, Tiflis governorate, Georgia, Russian Empire
- Died: 2 September 1966 (aged 61); Tiflis, Georgian SSR, USSR
- Military career
- Allegiance: (Soviet Union) USSR
- Branch: OGPU / NKVD
- Service years: 1928–1953
- Rank: Lieutenant General
- Commands: various NKVD related divisions and departments Primorsky Krai NKVD; Samara Oblast NKVD; 3rd Special Division of the First Main Directorate
- Conflicts: World War II
- Awards: Order of the Red Banner (2); Order of Suvorov, 2nd class Order of the National Flag

Mikhail Maksimovich Gvishiani (Georgian: მიხეილ გვიშიანი, Russian: Михаил Максимович Гвишиани; January 6, 1905 – September 2, 1966) was a Georgian officer of the Soviet NKVD. He oversaw the deportation and relocation of ethnic groups from the North Caucasus, which was planned and organized by Lavrentiy Beria and approved by Stalin. Mikhail Gvishiani is particularly known for his involvement in the burning of some 700 civilians in what would later become known as the Khaibakh massacre.

== Early life ==
Mikhail Givishiani was born into a Georgian farmworker's family. He graduated school and became active as assistant-chef, assistant driver and also watchmen for a hospital in Akhaltsikhe. In 1924 he began to work as a clerk and deputy department manager in a sub-branch of the Soviet Ministry of Finance. After entering the Red Army in 1928, Gvishiani was assigned to the Joint State Political Directorate (OGPU) and posted for matters concerning the Far East of the Soviet Union, until 1938.

== NKVD career ==
From 1928 to 1938 lieutenant Gvishiani was assigned to and took charge of various divisions and departments of mainly Georgian branches of the Soviet secret police apparatus NKVD. He got promoted to major in 1936 and two years and two promotions later in 1938 was deployed as chief to 3rd Special Division of the First Main Directorate in the Novosibirsk Oblast where he served as a Commissar of State Security 3rd Class. During the Soviet invasion of Manchuria in 1945 Givishiani was awarded several decorations for repatriating all industrial assets from Manchuria to the Soviet Union, for which he was promoted to lieutenant general the same year.

== Operation Lentil ==
On February 27, 1944 Colonel Gvishiani ordered the killing of over 200 Chechen civilians via telegram in what is known as the Khaibakh massacre. In 2014 the Russian Ministry of Culture dismissed any claims of a massacre in Kaibakh as "historical falsification", even though an overall consensus of other sources consider the massacre historical fact. The Russian Ministry of Culture did not dispute that he took a significant role in the deportations of ethnic groups during Operation Lentil.

== Ousting and discharge ==
With Beria's downfall in 1953, Gvishiani lost his patron and as a political consequence was discharged, officially due to a conflict of authority, and deemed unworthy to hold the rank of a general officer. However, he was not imprisoned but was stripped of his rank.

== Family ==
His son, Dzhermen Gvishiani, was married to the daughter of Communist Party Central Committee member Alexei Kosygin, who later became prime minister. That connection likely saved his life. His grandson Alexei Gvishiani, a prominent scientist, was born in 1948. His adopted daughter Laura Vasilievna Kharadze was first wife of future Russian prime minister Evgeny Primakov.
