= Ordered to Forget =

- Directed by: Khusein Erkenov
- Screenplay by: Ruslan Kokanaev and Sultan Zaurbekov
- Produced by: Ruslan Kokanaev
- Production company: Sheikh Mansur Grozny Film Studio
- Release date: October 14, 2014 (Warsaw)
- Running time: 87 minutes
- Country: Russia
- Languages: Chechen and Russian

Ordered to Forget (Russian: Приказано забыть, romanized: Prikazano zabyt') is a 2014 Russian film directed by Hussein Erkenov.

The film was intended to debut on 10 May 2014 but was banned because the Russian Ministry of Culture officially denies the events of the Khaibakh massacre and claimed the film would create ethnic hatred after denouncing the film as "anti-Russian". The makers of the film stated that they did not wish to promote hatred of Russians, and the film depicts many ethnic Russians characters outright resisting orders to kill Chechen and Ingush civilians issued by NKVD officer Mikhail Gvishiani. Despite the government's ban on showing the film, it was screened at the Moscow International Film Festival.

== Plot ==
One of the film's protagonists, Daud, is out hunting when NKVD officers arrest his father. Daud's mother explains the reason for the arrest: Seda—Daud's girlfriend—has rejected the advances of Kasim, the commander of the NKVD unit stationed in the village. Daud seeks advice from Mullah Arsamak, who lives in a neighboring village. The mullah expresses sympathy and urges Daud not to let despair or hatred take root in his heart. While Daud is visiting Arsamak, his mother passes away.

The village council chairman demands that Raykhan, a local administration employee, sign a denunciation against several villagers. Raykhan refuses and leaves the administration building. As she exits, she encounters NKVD officers leading a detainee—a fellow villager—who confesses to her that he has signed a denunciation. Some time later, Raykhan returns to the administration building. The chairman is pleased, assuming she intends to sign the document, but instead, she hands over the official seals in her possession and leaves. She is subsequently arrested.

Inside the administration building, Kasim is having lunch with his deputy. Daud ties up the two soldiers guarding the building, bursts into the room brandishing a weapon, disarms Kasim and his deputy, and steals their horses, which he then turns over to the war effort. Enraged, Kasim storms into Seda's home and tries to force her to reveal Daud's whereabouts. Seda refuses, and Kasim attempts to drag her away by force. Her father opens fire, and in the ensuing confusion, Seda escapes into the forest.

Daud finds her in the forest. After receiving their families' blessing, they marry and begin living in the woods. An NKVD unit arrives in the mountains to capture Daud, but the couple manages to evade them. In the mountains, Daud encounters *abreks* (outlaws/insurgents) and joins them.

Due to the lack of passable roads, it proves impossible to deport the population of Khaibakh—along with residents of neighboring villages who had been rounded up there—on schedule. They are locked inside a collective farm stable. To meet the deportation deadline, the colonel commanding the operation (modeled after Commissar of State Security 3rd Rank Mikhail Gvishiani) orders the stable set on fire. Dziyaudin Malsagov, the Deputy People's Commissar of Justice for Chechen-Ingushetia, and an officer who supported him, are arrested for attempting to intervene. The senior lieutenant ordered to set the fire shoots himself. NKVD soldiers gun down the people fleeing the flames. Daud and Seda witness the events but are powerless to stop them.

== Cast ==
- Shamkhan Mitrayev – Daud
- Kheda Akhmadova – Seda
- Movsar Atayev – Chairman of the village council
- Khava Akhmadova – Daud's mother
- Timur Badalbeyli – NKVD Colonel
- Ruslan Kokonayev – Daud's friend
- Roman Kouznechenko – Kasim
- Andrey Mekhontsev – soldier
- Aleksandr Novin – Duzhak
- Roza Khayrullina – Raikhan

== Production ==
Initially, the film held "National Film of Russia" status, which entitled it to state budget funding; in practice, however, it was produced using private donations. Abubakar Arsamakov served as the general sponsor. The film’s working title was Pepel (Ash). Although the filmmakers originally intended to release it under that name, they had to change it following the release of a TV series of the same name. They explained the current title by citing the widespread view that these events should be forgotten.

After the Chechen-Ingush ASSR was restored, the Galanchozhsky District—where these events took place—was not re-established. The area is currently uninhabited, and access is restricted to those with special permits. Consequently, filming took place in the Shatoysky, Kurchaloyevsky, and Itum-Kalinsky districts of Chechnya. The choice of director was influenced by the fact that Erkenov himself belongs to a deported people—the Karachays. He promised his father at age 16 that he would make a film about the deportations. Erkenov had previously made a film titled Kholod (Cold) about the deportation of his own people. Editing and sound production were carried out at the Mosfilm studio. Parishioners from the mosque on Novokuznetskaya Street in Moscow provided significant assistance during production, lending their voices to many of the film's scenes. The screenplay's consultants included Khizri Khadzhiev, a lecturer at Chechen University; Salamat Gaev, Tamara Chagaeva, and Musa Khadisov, authors of the book Khaibakh: The Investigation Continues and Magomed Muzaev, director of the Chechen Republic's archival fund. Gaev was also a survivor of the actual massacre.

In one scene, soldiers shoot hospital patients; a real-life incident of this nature occurred in Urus-Martan. In another scene, a local administration worker named Raikhan refuses to sign a denunciation. This character was based on the grandmother of Ruslan Kokonaev—the film's producer, co-writer, and a minor actor—who was exiled to Siberia for a similar act of defiance and ultimately died there. The production shot real-life footage of Khaibakh massacre survivors Gaev and Mumadi Elgakayev, the latter of whom died before the film's release.

The film features an accordion that once belonged to the Chechen musician and composer Umar Dimaev. It was this very instrument that Dimaev used to boost the morale of his fellow Chechens during the years of deportation. In the film, he is played by Dimaev’s son Amarbek. During production, Komsomolskaya Pravda wrote an article entitled "Russian money is used to shoot anti-Russian cinema", with Erkenov suggesting the producers sue the newspaper for slander since the film had not yet been seen by audiences. In the closing credits, the film thanked Chechen president Ramzan Kadyrov.

== Release ==
=== Film ban ===
The film’s premiere was scheduled to take place in Grozny on May 10, 2014. However, the Russian Ministry of Culture banned the film’s screening within Russia, claiming that it "incites interethnic discord". According to the film's producer, Ruslan Kokonaev, he possesses a psycholinguistic expert assessment that directly contradicts the Ministry's opinion.

According to other sources, Vyacheslav Telnov, head of the Department of Cinematography Support, refused to issue a distribution permit. He cited the absence of documents in NKVD archives confirming the events depicted in the film, labeled the film a "historical fake," and stated that screening it would incite interethnic discord. The Ministry of Culture claimed that a different agency had issued the ban and stated that the film had been sent for expert review, though they could not specify which kind. Khusein Erkenov stated that there is a vast number of documents regarding the events in question and expressed surprise that Ministry officials had failed to find them.

Ruslan Kokonaev said:

I believe that this film, contrary to prevailing opinions, actually rehabilitates Russians; it shows what really happened. The central theme running through the entire film is that the human being is created as the most precious creature on Earth and is born free. In those years, the rights of society were disregarded; the will of one powerful individual prevailed over the rights and will of society. Human rights and freedoms were violated. The film draws no parallels with the current government; we depicted the authorities and society of that specific time.

=== Festival Screening ===
In 2014, the film was screened as part of the non-competitive program at the Moscow International Film Festival. This took place following a demand by the film's director, Khusein Erkenov, which was supported by film critics. News of the screening broke just five days before the festival began. Many viewers were unable to attend. Notably, the film was not listed in the festival brochures or the program published on the official website. It was screened at a number of international film festivals, including those in Dubai, Venice, Cairo, Prague, Karlovy Vary, and Japan.

=== Critical reception ===
Critic Orkhan Dzhemal wrote: "It was a remarkable feat of directorial magic. It was clear that Erkenov couldn't care less about the rules governing cinema made for the intellectual, the refined, and the connoisseur. From his vantage point, he saw a certain secret—a secret that allowed him, disregarding all conventions, to create a film that moved both the sophisticated and the ordinary to tears."
