= Memorial to the Victims of the Deportation of 1944 =

Former monument in Grozny, Chechnya

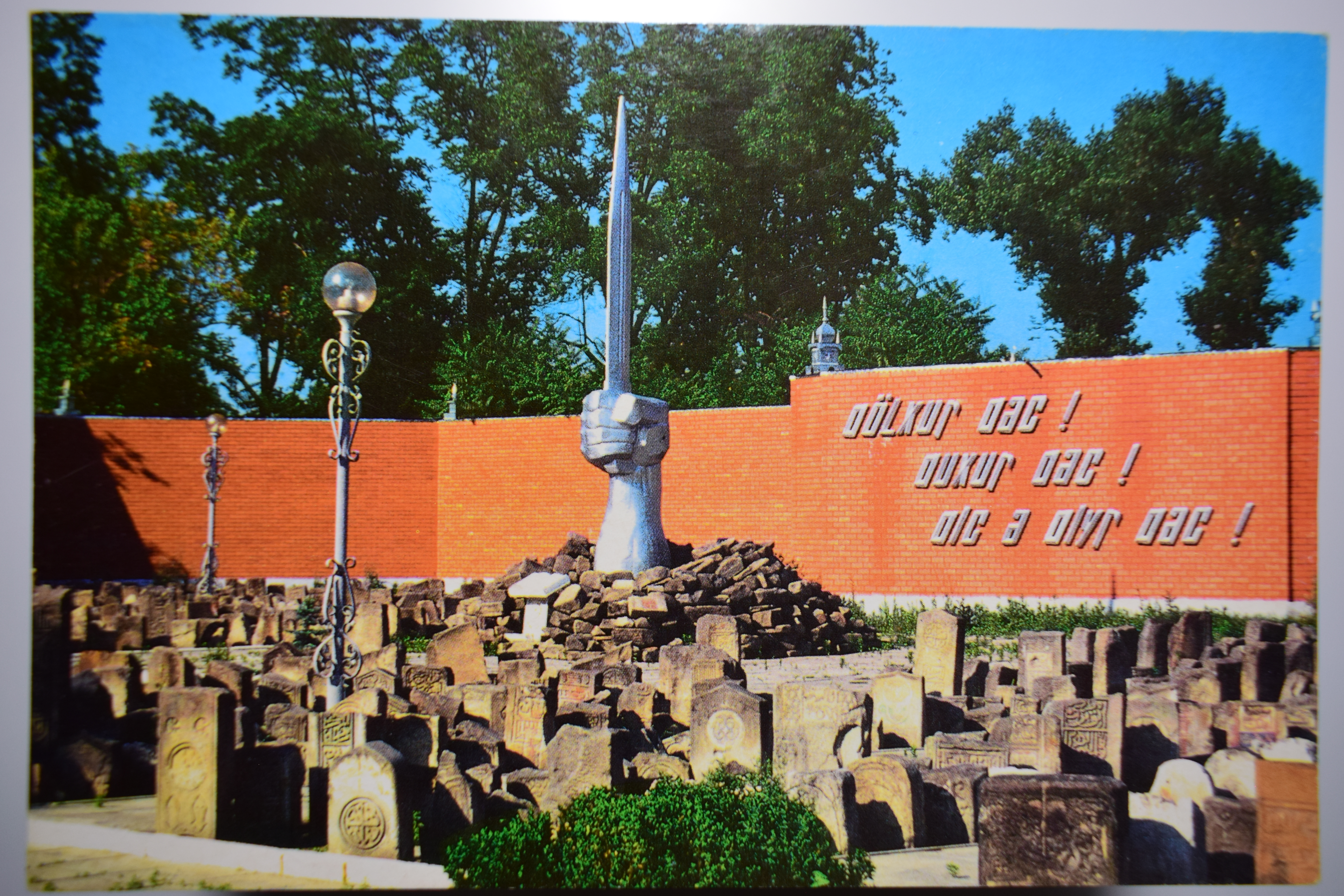
Postcard with the image of the Memorial. The inscription on the wall means: "We will not weep! We will not break! We will not forget!" ("Духур дац! Доьлхур дац! Диц дийр дац!")

The Memorial to the Victims of the Deportation of 1944 (Chechen: 1944 шарахь дIабохийначеран хIоллам, 1944 şaraẋ dIaboxiynaçeran hollam; Russian: Мемориал жертвам депортации 1944 года) was a Chechen memorial in the center of Grozny, capital of Chechnya, opened in 1992 to commemorate the Chechen victims of the Stalinist regime during and following their forced relocation to Central Asia in February 1944. The monument was sculpted by Chechen sculptor Darchi Khaskhanov.

Partially destroyed by bombing of the Russian army during the periods between 1994–1996 and 1999–2000, the memorial complex was again defaced in a 2008 attempt to demolish it by the authorities. At the time, the uproar of human rights defenders at this "barbarism" and "vandalism" saved "the only really Chechen monument of the city" from the complete demolition, although, inevitably regarded as a symbol of independence, it was then enclosed by a fence, so that nothing was indicating to the uninitiated that a memorial or anything else was out there somewhere.

However, in February 2014, on the eve of the 70th anniversary of the deportation of the Chechen people, the memorial was finally and secretly dismantled "by order from above". Tombstones which were an integral part of the composition were found planted on the Akhmad Kadyrov Place next to granite steles honoring the losses of the local pro-Russian power.
