= Dimitri Semenikhin =

Russian businessman and writer (born 1996)

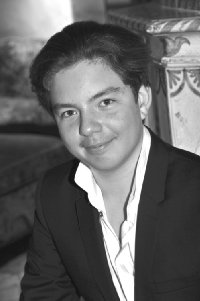
- Born: Dimitri Vladimirovich Semenikhin; December 15, 1996 (age 29); Moscow, Russian Federation
- Education: King's College London
- Occupation: Founder of Yacht Harbour
- Parents: Vladimir Semenikhin (father); Ekaterina Semenikhin (mother)

Dimitri Semenikhin (born December 15, 1996) is a Russian businessman and writer. Semenikhin is the founder of the Yacht Harbour media holding and author of 5 science-fiction novels.

== Early years ==
Semenikhin was born in Moscow, Russia, on December 15, 1996, and moved to the Principality of Monaco in 1999 with his parents, Vladimir Semenikhin and Ekaterina Semenikhin.

In 2010 he published Galaxie Envahie at the Editions Persée which was followed by Galaxie Envahie II (2011), Galaxie Envahie III (2012) and Le Bien de l'Humanité (2012). Semenikhin switched publishers in 2014 and released The Ghost and the Storyteller with US-based, LOF.

== Business ==
Semenikhin founded Yacht Harbour in December 2014 in Monaco and launched the company's web-platform in January 2015 which Investopedia named one of the 4 best platforms to find superyachts. In November 2015, he participated in the launch of his company's natural language processing interface, Brook.

Together with Gualtiero Giori, he co-founded FLOAT, a French startup allowing its users to rent yachts by the seat, in June 2017.

Owler estimates Semenikhin's holding's company revenue at $4.4 million (2016).
