= State Committee for Science and Technology =

The State Committee for Science and Technology (Gosudarstvennyi Komitet po Nauke i Tekhnike—GKNT) was an influential committee established in the Soviet Union in 1965. It took over from the State Committee for the Introduction of New Technologies (Gostekhnika) which had existed since 1948. The organisation was abolished on 1 December 1991 by the Decree of the State Council of the USSR of November 14, 1991.

== Personnel ==
Vladimir Kirillin was appointed chairman. He retained this position until 1980 when he was replaced by Gury Marchuk. Dzhermen Gvishiani was appointed Deputy Chairman.
