= Gury Marchuk =

Soviet scientist

- Гурий Марчук
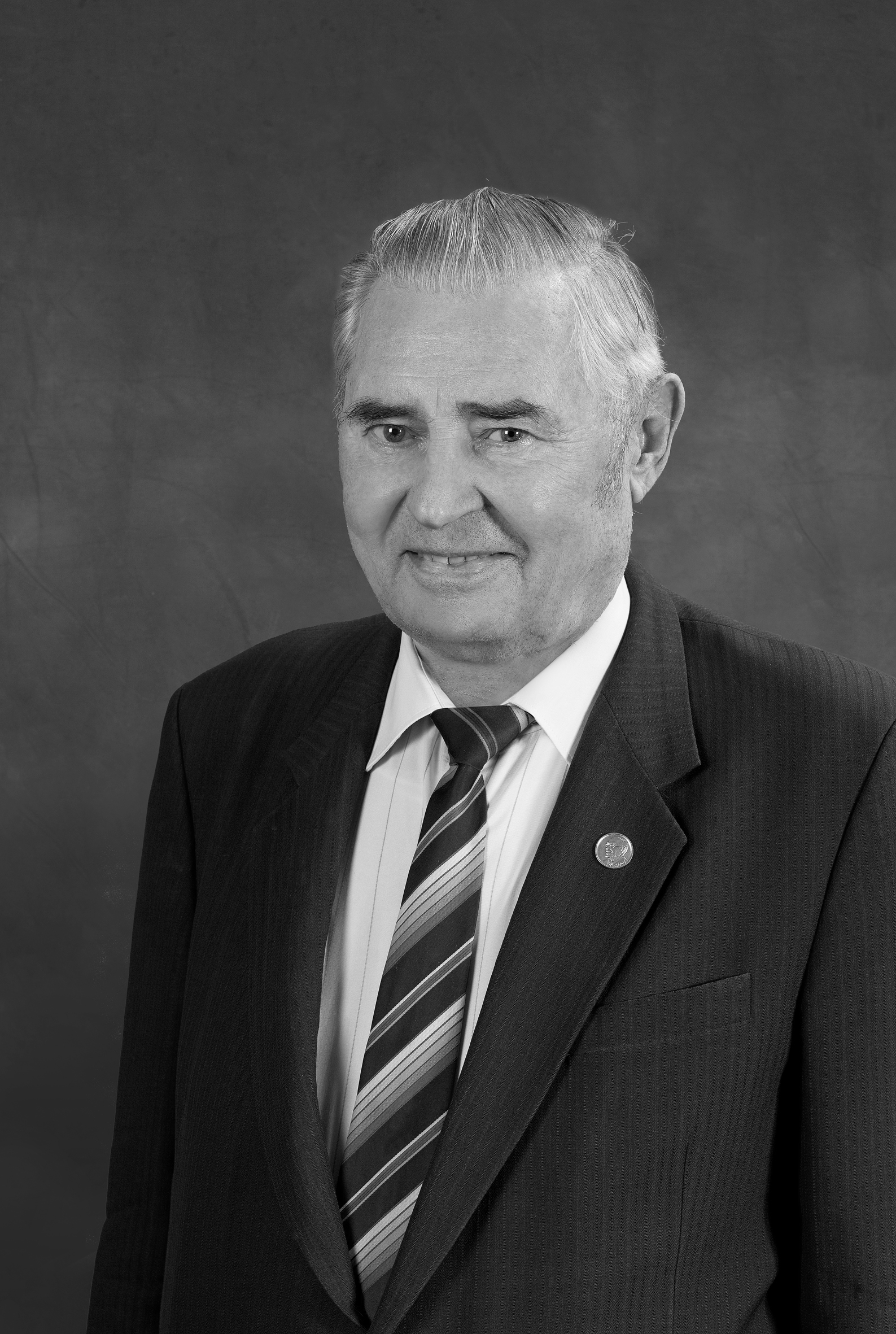
- Marchuk in 2012
- Born: 8 June 1925; Petro-Khersonets, Orenburg Governorate, USSR
- Died: 24 March 2013 (aged 87); Moscow, Russia
- Education: Leningrad State University
- Awards: Lomonosov Gold Medal (2004)

Gury Ivanovich Marchuk (Russian: Гурий Иванович Марчук; 8 June 1925 – 24 March 2013) was a Soviet and Russian scientist in the fields of computational mathematics, and physics of atmosphere. Academician (since 1968); the President of the USSR Academy of Sciences in 1986–1991. Among his notable prizes are the USSR State Prize (1979), Demidov Prize (2004), Lomonosov Gold Medal (2004).

Marchuk was born in Orenburg Oblast, Russia. A member of the Communist Party of the Soviet Union since 1947, Academician Marchuk was elected to the Central Committee of the Party as a candidate member in 1976 and as a full member in 1981. He was elected as deputy of the Supreme Soviet of the Union of Soviet Socialist Republics in 1979. He was appointed to succeed Vladimir Kirillin as chairman of the State Committee for Science and Technology (GKNT) in 1980.

Marchuk was a proponent of the Integrated Long-Term Programme (ILTP) of Cooperation in Science & Technology that was established in 1987 as a scientific cooperative venture between India and the Soviet Union. The programme allowed the scientists of the countries to collaboratively undertake research in areas as diverse as healthcare and lasers. Marchuk co-chaired the programme's Joint Council with Prof. C.N.R. Rao for 25 years and was made an honorary member of India's National Academy of Sciences. In 2002, the Government of India conferred the Padma Bhushan on him.

== Honours and awards ==
- Hero of Socialist Labour (1975)
- Honorary Citizen of Obninsk (1985)
- Four Orders of Lenin (1967, 1971, 1975, 1985)
- Keldysh Gold Medal — for his work "The development and creation of new methods of mathematical modeling" (1981)
- Karpinski International Prize (1988)
- Chebyshev Gold Medal — for outstanding performance in mathematics (1996)
- Lomonosov Gold Medal (Moscow State University, 2004) - for his outstanding contribution to the creation of new models and methods for solving problems in the physics of nuclear reactors, the physics of the atmosphere and ocean, and immunology
- Cavalier silver sign "Property of Siberia"
- Lenin Prize in Science (1961)
- Friedman Prize (1975)
- USSR State Prize (1979)
- State Prize of the Russian Federation (2000)
- Demidov Prize (2004)
- Honorary Doctorates of the University of Toulouse (1973), Charles University (Prague, 1978), Dresden University of Technology (1978), Technical University of Budapest (1978)
- Foreign Member of the Bulgarian Academy of Sciences (1977), German Academy of Sciences at Berlin (1977), Czechoslovak Academy of Sciences (1977), Polish Academy of Sciences (1988)
- Order of Merit for the Fatherland, 2nd and 4th classes
- Jubilee Medal "300 Years of the Russian Navy"
- Medal "For the Victory over Germany in the Great Patriotic War 1941–1945"
- Medal "For Valiant Labour in the Great Patriotic War 1941-1945"
- Commander of the Legion of Honour
- Order of Georgi Dimitrov
- Padma Bhushan (2002)
- Vilhelm Bjerknes Medal (2008)

Academic offices
Preceded by Anatoly Alexandrov	President of the Academy of Sciences of the USSR; 1986–1991	Succeeded by Yury Osipov
Preceded by Vladimir Kirillin	Chairman of the State Committee for Science and Technology (GKNT); 1980–1987	Succeeded by Boris Tolstykh
