= Khaibakh massacre =

1944 genocide in Chechnya

Khaibakh massacre (1944)
- Part of Operation Lentil
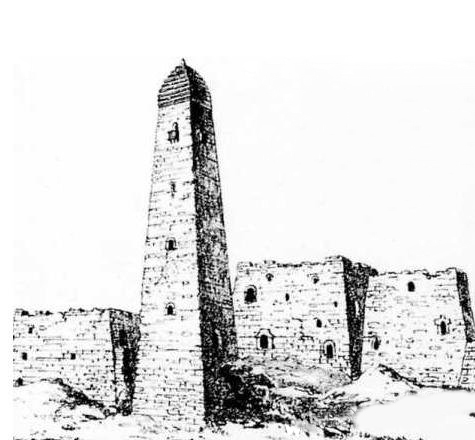
- Tower in the village of Khaibakh (1888)
- Location: 42°52′38″N 45°21′28″E; Khaibakh, Chechnya
- Date: 27 February 1944
- Target: Chechen villagers
- Attack type: Genocidal massacre
- Deaths: 700+ villagers
- Perpetrator: Soviet NKVD

The Khaibakh massacre (Chechen: Хьайбахехь нах байар, romanized: Ẋaybaxeẋ nax bayar) was the mass murder of the Chechen civilian population of the aul (village) Khaibakh, in the mountainous part of Chechnya, by Soviet forces during the deportations of 1944 on 27 February 1944.

== Timeline ==
The massacre took place on 27 February 1944 during Operation Lentil (the Soviet mass deportation of Chechens to prison camps in Central Asia). Due to inclement weather it was impossible to convoy Chechen deportees to the railway stations by the deadline set by Beria, resulting in over 700 villagers (including "non-transportable" persons: elderly, pregnant women and small children) being locked in a stable fortified with dry hay and burned alive; those who attempted to break free from the burning stable were shot. One of the witnesses assigned to the military unit, interpreter Ziautdin Malsagov, recalls that NKVD commander Gvishiani called the two newborn children in the stable "bandits" before ordering to burn the 704 people alive. After the incident, Gveshiani was reportedly congratulated for his success and good work by Lavrenty Beria, who promised him a medal.

== Rediscovery ==
The aul of Khaibakh was rediscovered through archaeological finds in Ukraine. World War II archaeologists found the remains of North Caucasian scouts who died during an operation behind enemy (German) lines. Letters addressed to their relatives were found in their water-resistant pockets, addressed to aul Khaibakh. Stepan Kashurko, one of the archaeologists, accompanied by a former Soviet general, decided to inform the families that the bodies of their relatives were found, but they learned that the settlement no longer existed. In continuing their search, they discovered that while the Chechen soldiers were dying at the front, their relatives were burned alive by the NKVD.

== Gvishiani telegram ==
A number of sources cite a telegram of the State Security Commissioner of the third rank Mikhail Gvishiani informs Lavrenty Beria about the burning of the inhabitants of the village of Khaybakh:

Совершенно секретно. Наркому внутренних дел СССР тов. Л. П. Берия. Только для ваших глаз. В виду не транспортабельности и с целью неукоснительного выполнения в срок операции «Горы», вынужден был ликвидировать более 700 жителей в местечке Хайбах. Полковник Гвишиани

English translation: Top secret. To L. P. Beria, head of NKVD. For your eyes only. I was obliged to eliminate more than 700 inhabitants of Khaibakh aul, in order to complete in time "Gory" operation and because of inability to convey these people. Colonel Gvishiani

Analyzing the text of the telegram, Pavel Polyan comes to the conclusion that it is doubtful: "only for your eyes" has never been used in Soviet secret office work, one of the leaders of Operation Lentil calls it "Горы" ("Mountains") and does not know oun military rank.

== Criticism ==
In a refusal to permit the release of the 2014 film Ordered to Forget about the massacre, the Russian Ministry of Culture stated that it had searched three Russian state archives, and that "as a result of the investigation, no documents were discovered proving the fact of the mass burning of residents" from Khaibakh. The ministry then claimed that the event was a case of historical falsification. However, the special commission responsible for investigating the massacre in 1990 concluded on 20 August that the massacre had indeed happened.

Russian historian Pavel Polyan in his early publications acknowledged the existence of the massacre and mentioned several other massacres committed by the NKVD and referred to the "Gvishiani telegram", but in the 2011 book he recognized the telegram as questionable, and the story with Khaibakh unproven.

== See also ==
- List of massacres in the Soviet Union
