= Alexei Gvishiani =

Russian mathematician (born 1948)

Alexei Dzhermenovich Gvishiani
- Алексей Джерменович Гвишиани
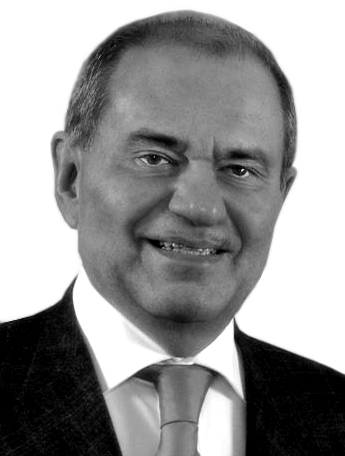
- Born: 29 October 1948 (age 77); Moscow, Russian SFSR, Soviet Union
- Education: Lomonosov Moscow State University, MSU Faculty of Mechanics and Mathematics
- Spouse: Natalia Gvishiani
- Children: Ekaterina Semenikhin
- Awards: Order of Friendship (2009); Medal "In Commemoration of the 850th Anniversary of Moscow" (1997); Medal "50 Years of the Mongolian People's Revolution" (1971)
- Scientific career
- Fields: Mathematics, Geoinformatics
- Doctoral advisor: I. Gelfand

Alexei Dzhermenovich Gvishiani (Russian: Алексей Джерменович Гвишиани; 29 October 1948) is a Russian scientist, full member (academician) of the Russian Academy of Sciences (RAS). Chief scientist of the Geophysical Center of RAS. Member of the Scientific Coordinating Council of the Federal Agency of Scientific organizations of Russia (FASO) and the Expert Council of the Russian Scientific Foundation. Foreign member of the Romanian Academy of Engineering and Technical Sciences and the National Academy of Sciences of Ukraine. Doctor Honoris Causa of the National Technological University of Ukraine, professor of Lomonosov Moscow State University and the Paris Institute of Earth Physics of the Earth. Chair of the Russian Geophysical Committee and CODATA Committee of the Russian Academy of Sciences, vice-president of CODATA in 2002-2006. Vice-chair of the WDC Panel of the International Council for Science (ICSU) (1996–2006). Deputy chairman of the Committee of System Analysis, RAS. Vice-president of the Scientific Council International Institute for Applied Systems Analysis (IIASA) and IIASA Program Committee chair (2010–2014). Member of Academia Europaea (2017).

== Biography and academic career ==
Gvishiani was born on October 29, 1948, in Moscow in the family of a prominent philosopher, expert in control theory and systems analysis, full member (academician) of the USSR Academy of Sciences, Dzhermen Gvishiani. Through Dzhermen he is the grandson of Mikhail Gvishiani, the NKVD general. On his mother's side Gvishiani is a grandson of Alexei Kosygin, Chairman of the USSR Council of Ministers in 1964–1980.

After graduating from Lomonosov Moscow State University (MSU), А. Gvishiani entered for postgraduate education at the chair of the theory of functions and functional analysis, Department of mathematics and mechanics of MSU. He was a student of an internationally famous mathematician Prof. Izrael M. Gelfand.

During Gvishiani's postgraduate studies he published a number of papers in leading mathematical journals. His main result was the proof of the Gelfand-Graev-Gvishiani formula for the characters of discrete series representations for the group of matrices with elements from a local non-Archimedean field (1973–74). During his university studies he was influenced by prominent Soviet scientists – I. Gelfand, М. Keldysh, V. Chelomey, V. Sadovnichy and V. Maslov (presently academicians), M. Graev, А. Kirillov.

In 1974 Gvishiani defended his PhD thesis devoted to the theory of functions and functional analysis. From 1974 to 1978 Gvishiani worked as assistant and then as associate professor at the Department of mathematics and mechanics of MSU.

In 1978 Gvishiani took a research position in the Schmidt Institute of Physics of the Earth of the Academy of Sciences. His career in this Institute developed from a research assistant starting as a research assistant up to deputy director general.

In 1983, Gvishiani defended his doctoral thesis in geophysics at the Schmidt Institute of Physics of the Earth.

In 1991–2005 Gvishiani established and headed the Center for geophysical data studies and network technologies of IPE RAS. During his work at the Center he created theoretical foundations of geoinformatics as a part of mathematical geophysics. In 2005 he was elected the director of the Geophysical Center of the Russian Academy of Sciences (GC RAS) and remained in that position till 2018. In 2018 by the decree of the Bureau of the RAS Earth Sciences Division he was appointed the chief scientist of GC RAS.

In 2006 he was elected a corresponding member of the Russian Academy of Sciences in geoinformatics, and in 2011 – a full member of Russian Academy of Sciences in geology and geo-informatics. Since 2007 he is a member of the bureau, and since 2008 Deputy Academician Secretary of the Earth Sciences Division of RAS. He is also a member of the RAS Scientific Council on the complex problems of Eurasian economic integration, modernization, competitiveness and sustainable development and Fellow of the Russian Geographical Society.

== Scientific results achieved ==
- New features of non-Archimedean Radon transformation and the following study of representations of the group G=SL(2) in a functional space over Lobachevsky plane (1974–1978);
- Introduction of a new family of classification algorithms "Voting by the Set of Feature (VFS)" for studying dynamic recognition problems (1979–1985);
- New dichotomy classification algorithms with single learning class (since 2016)
- Pattern recognition system FCAZ (Fuzzy Clustering and Zoning) to determine areas of the highest seismic risk (2014–2015)
- Construction of a mathematical model of recognition of possible strong earthquakes epicenters locations and their time stability as a basis for seismic zoning; recognition of possible strongest, strong and significant earthquake occurrence locations in seismic regions of the Earth and evaluation of their reliability using the models for dynamic pattern recognition (1978–1990 and 2010–2013);
- Hierarchic clustering of spatial geophysical and geodynamic objects using discrete mathematical analysis; original algorithms of time series anomaly recognition on the basis of the fuzzy sets theory and their application to volcano monitoring and to the analysis of gravity and geomagnetic data (1999–2012);
- Development and integration into a single network of a system of magnetic observatories in the Russian Federation, (the highest standard of quality INTERMAGNET), integrated by a common center for geomagnetic data acquisition and analysis (2009–2013);
- Unique original automated hardware-software system to monitor and recognize geomagnetic activity using the network of observatories and satellite data (2014–2016);
- System analysis and in magnetic and other geophysical and geological data studies. New methods of magnetic activity recognition using observatory and satellite data (since 2006).

== International scientific research ==
Gvishiani made an outstanding contribution to the development of cooperation between Russian Academy of Sciences and the International Institute for Applied Systems Analysis (IIASA)/ as well as to promotion of cooperation between Russian scientists and the international scientific community.

Academician Gvishiani has been active in the field of international scientific cooperation: Vice President of the European Mediterranean seismological center (EMSC/CSEM) (EMSC/CSEM) (1996–2003); principal researcher of the joint project of RAS, RFBR and Scientific Research Center of France (CNRS) "Identification of areas of earthquake possible occurrence in regions of moderate seismicity" (PICS) (1980–1986, 1998–2001) and "Monitoring of basalt volcanoes with the use of artificial intelligence methods" (PICS) (2000–2006); delegate of RAS in the International Union of Geodesy and Geophysics (IUGG) (2007–2012) and CODATA (since 2005).

== Teaching and lecturing ==
In 1992–2000 Gvishiani was professor at the Chair of the theory of functions and functional analysis, MSU Department of mathematics and mechanics. He was a supervisor of two doctoral and twelve PhD theses.

А. Gvishiani was a visiting researcher in many scientific organizations in different countries, including the Institute of Physics of the Earth in Paris (Institut de Physique du Globe de Paris), Institute of Geography of Spain, American and German universities and research institutes.

== Editorial and publishing activity ==
He is the author of five books published in Russian, English, French, Hungarian, and Italian languages. More than 300 research papers were published in international and Russian scientific peer-reviewed journals. Works by A.D. Gvishiani were co-authored by Russian academicians I.M. Gelfand, M.A. Sadovsky, V.N. Strakhov, V.I. Keilis-Borok, I.F. Obraztsov, V.I. Osipov and French academicians Jean-Louis LeMouél and Jean Coulomb. Over the years Gvishiani actively participates in the work of the International Council for Science (ICSU), holding various positions: Chairman of the coordinating Committee “Data Centers and Data Exchange” and Bureau member of the International Program “Lithosphere” (1985–1995); head of a number of CODATA WGs; member of the ICSU Strategic Committee on Information and Data (SCID) (2007–2008); Liaison officer of IUGG in CODATA (ICSU) (2011–2019).

== Awards and honours ==
- Order of Friendship (2009)
- Medal "In Commemoration of the 850th Anniversary of Moscow"(1997)
- Medal "50 Years of the Mongolian People's Revolution" (1971)
