= Vladimir Kirillin =

Soviet politician (1913–1999)

- Владимир Кириллин
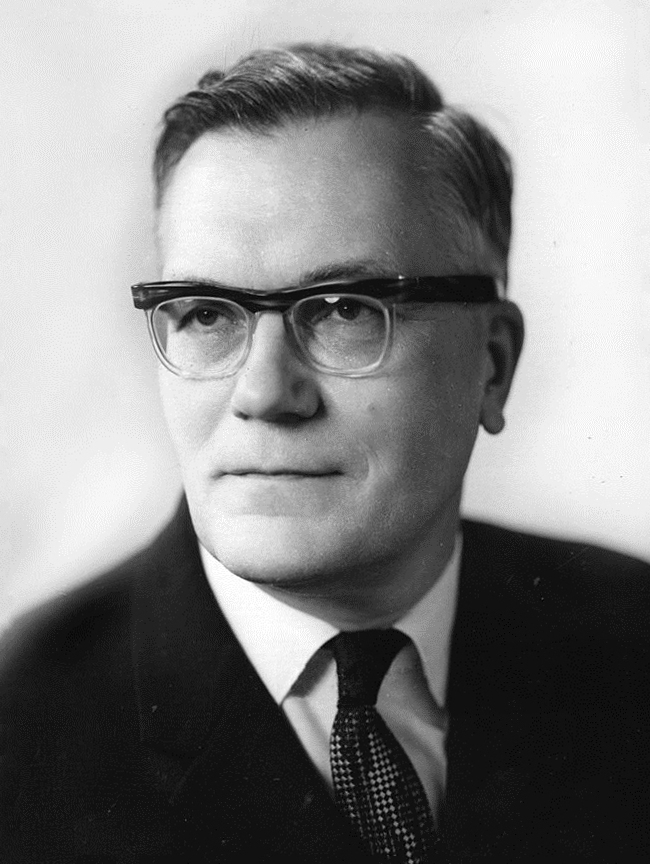
- Kirillin in the 1950s
- Born: Vladimir Alekseyevich Kirillin; January 20 [O.S. January 7] 1913; Moscow, Russian Empire
- Died: 29 January 1999 (aged 86); Moscow, Russia
- Education: Moscow Power Engineering Institute
- Scientific career
- Fields: Physics

Vladimir Alekseyevich Kirillin (Russian: Владимир Алексеевич Кириллин; January 20 [O.S. January 7] 1913 – 29 January 1999) was a Soviet physicist specializing in energetics and thermophysics and a member of the Academy of Sciences of the Soviet Union, as well as a Soviet party official.

After graduating from the Moscow Power Engineering Institute in 1936, Kirillin worked at the Kashira State Regional Electric Power Plant, at the Unifold Boiler Construction Bureau, and at the Moscow Power Engineering Institute, becoming its professor in 1952. During World War II he served in the navy. From 1954 to 1962 he took leading positions at the Soviet ministries of science and higher education. In 1963-1965 he served as vice-president of the Soviet Academy of Sciences, and in 1965 he was appointed as deputy chairman of the Council of Ministers of the USSR and chairman of the State Committee for Science and Technology (GKNT) of the Council of Ministers of the USSR. In 1966 Kirillin became a member of the Communist Party of the Soviet Union. He was a deputy to the Supreme Soviet of the Soviet Union at its sixth, seventh, and eighth meetings. He was awarded the Stalin Prize in 1951 and the Lenin Prize in 1959, as well as four Orders of Lenin and an Order of the Red Banner of Labour, among other medals.

Kirillin’s scientific research focused on the thermophysical properties of solids, liquid water and its vapor. He was also developing magnetohydrodynamic generators for the direct conversion of thermal energy into electric energy.

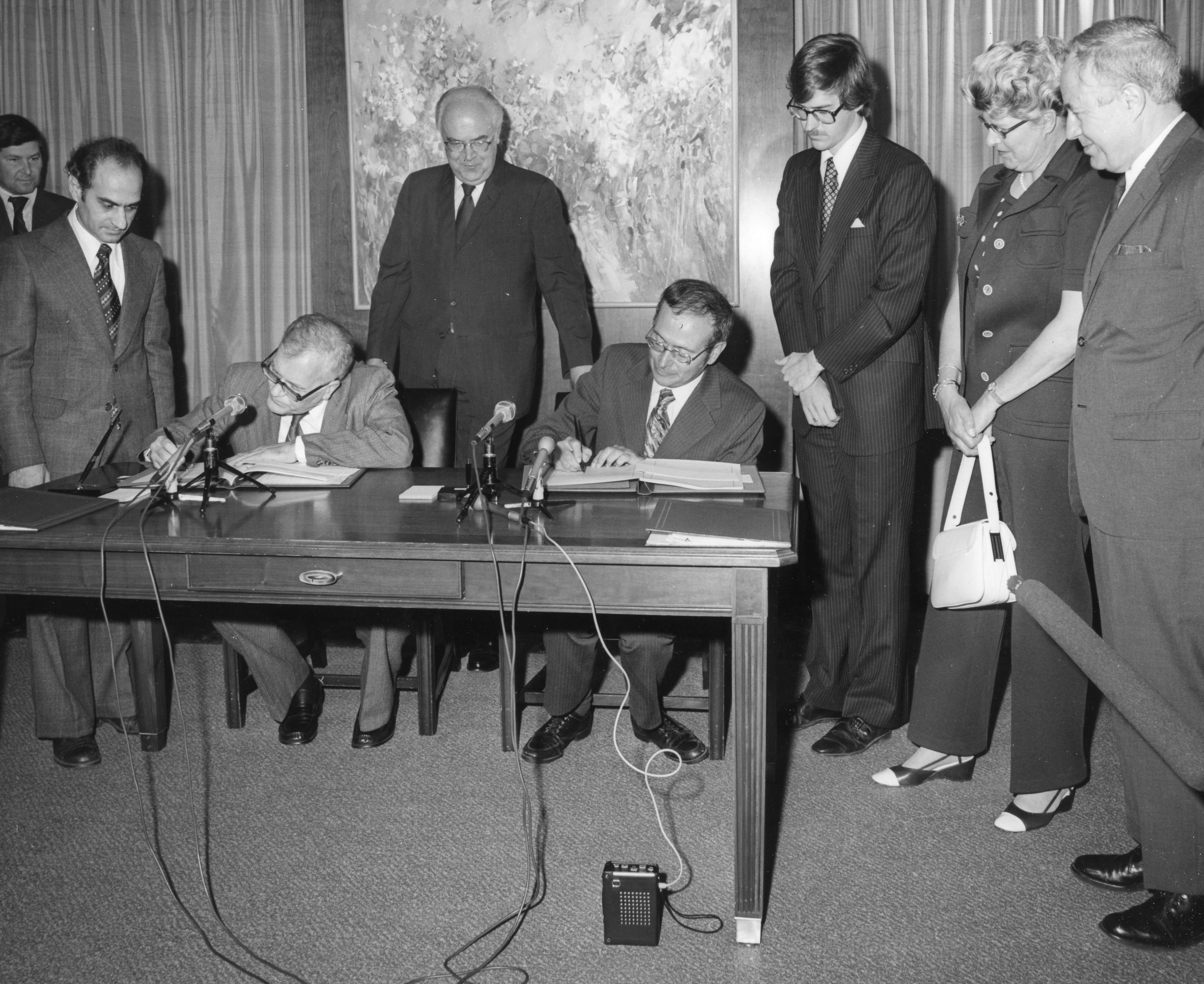
Kirillin and Frank Press signing the United States and USSR agreement on cooperation in science and technology

Preceded by	Chairman of the State Committee for Science and Technology (GKNT); 1965–1980	Succeeded by Gury Marchuk
