= Ekaterina Semenikhin =

Russian philanthropist

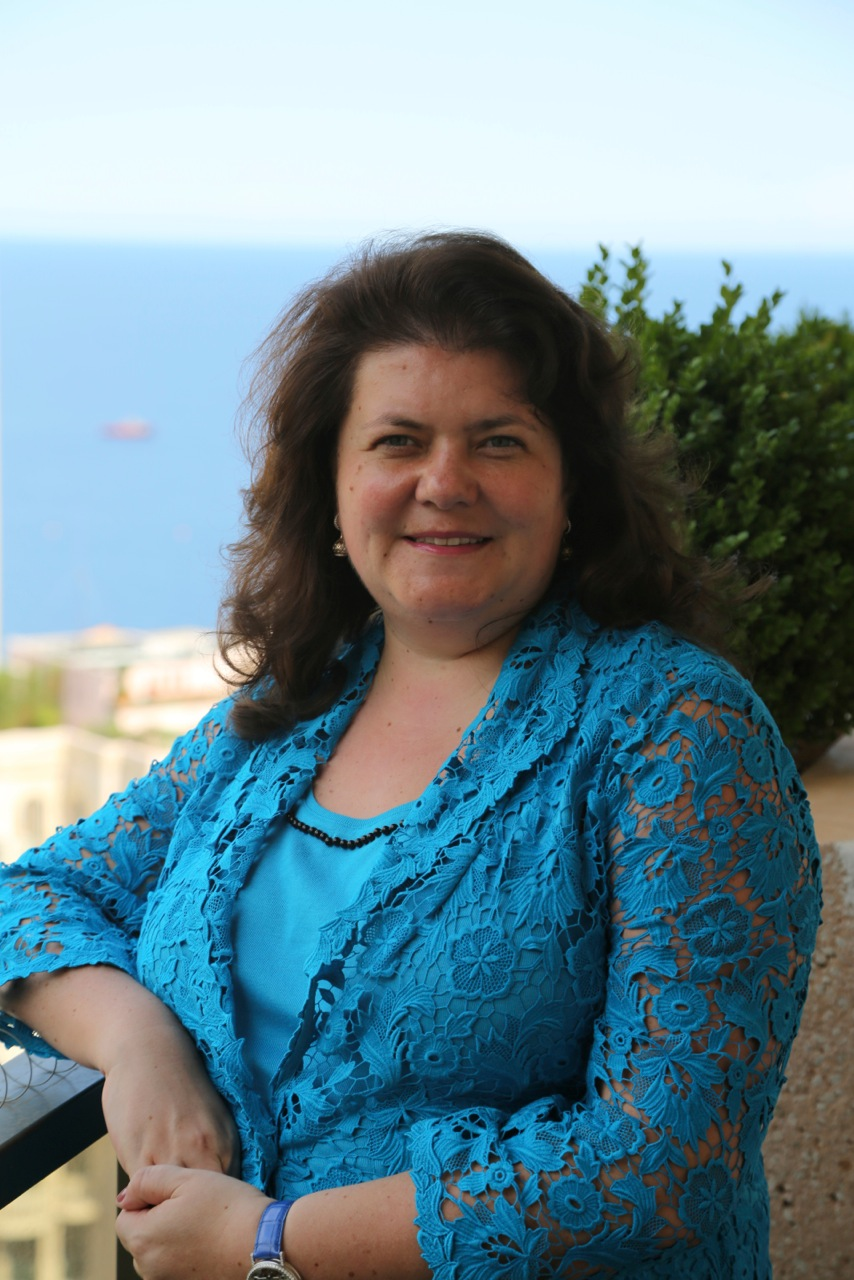
- Born: Ekaterina Gvishiani; 4 December 1971 (age 54); Moscow, USSR
- Education: Moscow State University
- Occupations: Co-Founder of the Ekaterina Cultural Foundation; Honorary Consul of Russia in Monaco
- Spouse: Vladimir Semenikhin
- Children: Dimitri Semenikhin; Annabelle Semenikhin

Ekaterina Alekseyevna Semenikhin (Russian: Екатерина Алексеевна Семенихина; born 4 December 1971) is a Russian art collector, philanthropist, economist and honorary consul. Semenikhin is the co-founder of the Ekaterina Cultural Foundation and the Honorary Consul of Russia in the Principality of Monaco. Her father is Alexei Gvishiani, a well-known scientist.

== Cultural activity ==
As of the early 2000s, Semenikhin, with her husband Vladimir Semenikhin, has co-founded a foundation to promote the arts in Russia and has, through it, supported exhibitions at State museums and galleries. The foundation was named The Ekaterina Cultural Foundation. It has conducted international exhibitions such as the Knave of Diamonds avant-gardist exhibition in 2004 in the Tretyakov Gallery and in the Russian Museum in St Petersbourg. In 2005, they have opened the first private exhibition halls in the center of Moscow. Since then, it has hosted venues such as the Grace Kelly exhibition in 2009 . The Semenikhins are also considered as one of Russia's leading art collectors and are believed to have one of the largest private art collections. Semenikhin has encouraged the development of the arts in Russia by hosting exhibitions of Russian painters from the avant-garde movement.

== Diplomatic work ==
Semenikhin has been, since 13 June 2014, the General Honorary Consul of Russia in the Principality of Monaco. As such she is taking part in the Year of Russia in Monaco in 2015. This includes her involvement in the organization of the official visit of a Russian delegation to Monaco in 2014 and of the Monegasque delegation to Moscow in 2015.

In January 2016, she was awarded the Order of Friendship by Russia for her involvement in the Year of Russia in Monaco.

== Awards ==
- Monegasque award for Cultural achievement (2011)
- ARCO prize of International Art Collecting in February 2011
- Knight of the Order of Cultural Merit of Monaco (2011)
- Russian Order of Friendship (2016).
- Knight of the Order of Saint-Charles (2016)
