= Lutz Kleveman =

German journalist

Lutz Kleveman (born 1974) is a German investigative journalist, photographer, and author.

Kleveman's books include The New Great Game: Blood and Oil in Central Asia published in 2004 and "Wanderjahre: A reporter's journey in a mad world" published in 2014. Kleveman's work often deals with the relationship between energy interests, geopolitics, and US foreign policy.

Beginning in 1999, he worked as a freelance journalist and photographer in the Balkans, West Africa, the former Soviet Union, Central Asia, and the Middle East. He has written and photographed for the Daily Telegraph, Die Zeit, Newsweek, Der Spiegel, Playboy Magazine and various other publications in Germany, Britain, and the United States.

His latest book Lemberg: Die vergessene Mitte Europas dealt with the history of the city of Lviv in Ukraine, including the Lviv pogroms (1941) and its position in the former Austrian Empire.

== Academic career ==
Kleveman studied French Literature in Aix-en-Provence and International History at the London School of Economics.

== Further publications ==
- Lemberg. Die vergessene Mitte Europas. Aufbau Verlag, Berlin 2017, ISBN 978-3-351-03668-3.
- The New Great Game. Grove Press, New York City 2004, ISBN 9780802141729.
