= Congress of the Ingush People (1989–1999) =

Ingush nationalist organisation active from 1989 to 1999

Congress of the Ingush People Съезд ингушского народа Съезд народов Ингушетии
- Leader: Issa Kodzoev (1989); Beksultan Seynaroyev (1989–1992); Organising Committee (1992–1999)
- Founded: 9 September 1989
- Dissolved: 22 November 1999
- Succeeded by: People's Assembly of the Republic of Ingushetia
- Headquarters: Nazran (1993–1999); Grozny (1989–1991)
- Ideology: Ingush nationalism; Federalism

The Congress of the Ingush People (Russian: Съезд ингушского народа, romanized: Syezd ingushskogo naroda) or the Congress of the Peoples of Ingushetia (Russian: Съезд народов Ингушетии, romanized: Syezd narodov Ingushetii) was a political organisation active in the Russian republic of Ingushetia from 1989 to 1999, when it formally became part of the legislature of Ingushetia and was reorganised into the People's Assembly. It was active during the East Prigorodny conflict, when it focused on the plight of Ingush refugees and the Russian military's support for the government of North Ossetia.

== History ==
The Congress of the Ingush People held its first meeting in the Chechen capital of Grozny on 9 September 1989. The meeting was numbered as the second congress in recognition of the Congress of the Revolutionary Ingush People, which took place on 4 February 1919 and declared Ingushetia as a separate entity from the Mountain Autonomous Soviet Socialist Republic. The congress established an organising committee for preparations to establish Ingush independence. It additionally published demands to adjust the Ingush border to include Prigorodny District and eastern parts of the city of Vladikavkaz (then known as Ordzhonikidze), a proposal that infuriated the leadership and populace of North Ossetia–Alania, and was one of the contributing factors to the East Prigorodny conflict.

In December 1990, the congress' first leader and leader of the Nijsxo party, Issa Kodzoev, was removed from his position and replaced by the moderate Beksultan Seynaroyev. The split was solidified following a 7 January 1990 rally by Nijsxo, which grew into a riot.

The Congress held its second meeting, also in Grozny, on 6–7 October 1991. At the congress, it was determined to establish a People's Assembly of Ingushetia (Russian: Народний совет Ингушетии), and the congress was renamed accordingly. Another measure adopted at the congress was for a popular referendum on establishing an Ingush republic. The referendum occurred on 30 November of the same year and succeeded with widespread support.

The East Prigorodny conflict began in October 1992, and ended within a month, resulting in the ethnic cleansing of the region's Ingush population. The Congress, which had previously promised that the Russian government would support Ingushetia during the conflict (on the contrary, they had supported North Ossetia), faced a rise in anti-Russian and Ingush nationalist sentiment. Seynaroyev resigned from leadership and became part of the Organising Committee, which held leadership roles. In a 17 January 1993 emergency session, the congress condemned the state of emergency and the Russian military presence in Ingushetia, and called for the International Court of Justice to formally condemn Russian and North Ossetian military activities.

Prior to the 1993 Ingush presidential election the congress selected major general Ruslan Aushev as its candidate in December 1992, although he was an independent. Aushev would go on to win the election unopposed. The slow pace of efforts to resettle Ingush refugees from the conflict, as well as continued ethnic violence in eastern North Ossetia, led to another outburst of anti-Russian sentiment. On 15 May 1993, the congress declared its intention to establish the Republic of Ingushetia as a "secular, legal, democratic state in union with the Russian Federation". At the 11 September 1993 congress, delegates urged Aushev to begin preparing a referendum on Ingushetia remaining part of Russia.

On 22 November 1999 the Congress of the Ingush People was legally subsumed into the People's Assembly of the Republic of Ingushetia, establishing it as the legislature of the Republic of Ingushetia.

== Organising Committee (1992–1999) ==
The sole permanent member of the Organising Committee was Bembulat Bogatyryov after he became a member of the Federal Assembly of Russia. The following members all served on a temporary basis:

- Beslan Kostoyev
- Yakub Kushtov
- Akhmed Kushtov
- Beksultan Seynaroyev

== Electoral results ==
Year	Candidate	Votes	%	Rank	Result
1993	Ruslan Aushev		99.94%	1st	Unopposed
