= Nijsxo =

Unregistered political party in Ingushetia, Russia

Nijsxo Нийсхо
- Leader: Issa Dashlakiyev
- Founded: May 1988
- Headquarters: Nazran
- Ideology: Ingush nationalism
- National affiliation: Congress of the Ingush People (1989–1992); Union of National Accord of Ingushetia (1993)
- Regional affiliation: Confederation of Mountain Peoples of the Caucasus

Nijsxo (Ingush: Нийсхо; Russian: Справедливость, lit. 'justice') is an unregistered political party active in the Russian republic of Ingushetia since 1988.

== History ==
Nijsxo was founded by Issa Kodzoev as the "Nijsxo Initiative Group in Support of Perestroika" in May 1988. In March of the next year the party launched a campaign for the establishment of an Ingush Autonomous Soviet Socialist Republic, separate from the Checheno-Ingush ASSR, with its capital in the city of Ordzhonikidze (now Vladikavkaz, North Ossetia–Alania). Nijsxo supported non-violent methods to facilitate the return of Ingush borders to their pre-1934 size, including public pressure on the North Ossetian and Soviet governments, though it was not successful.

Nijsxo participated in the founding Congress of the Ingush People on 9 September 1989, and Kodzoev was selected as leader of the congress. In December 1989, however, Kodzoev was removed and replaced by the more moderate Beksultan Seynaroyev. The split between Nijsxo and the Congress became clearer following a 7 January 1990 rally by Nijsxo, which became a riot, although Nijsxo remained formally part of the congress until November 1992.

The party opposed the 1991 Ingush referendum, on the basis that a referendum to affirm Ingush sovereignty was unnecessary, and actively attempted to prevent the referendum's results from being recognised. Based in Nazran, Nijsxo was more active in rural Ingushetia than the Congress, which was based in the Chechen capital of Grozny and maintained only a token presence in villages. In contrast to the pro-Russian congress, Nijsxo supported Dzhokhar Dudayev and Zviad Gamsakhurdia, as well as the Confederation of Mountain Peoples of the Caucasus, although they did not endorse Pan-Caucasianism.

Following the outbreak of the East Prigorodny conflict and the declaration of a state of emergency over North Ossetia and Ingushetia, Nijsxo was de jure required to stop its activities. De facto, however, Nijsxo actively worked alongside Ruslan Aushev, who was head of the Temporary Administration for the State of Emergency in Ingushetia. The party was part of Aushev's Union for National Accord of Ingushetia in the 1993 Ingush presidential election, but refused to support Aushev after he banned all political organisations and acceded to the Treaty of Federation before having prior demanded the return of Prigorodny District to Ingushetia.

Nijsxo was largely reduced in size by the summer of 1993, although it has continued to remain active in local and regional affairs. The organisation's leader after Kodzoev, Issa Dashlakiyev, condemned the abolition of direct elections for the heads of the republics of the North Caucasus in a 2013 letter to Russian President Vladimir Putin. The party also expressed support for the annexation of Crimea by the Russian Federation and called on Putin to return Prigorodny District to Ingushetia. Head of Ingushetia Yunus-bek Yevkurov met with Kodzoev in his capacity as a member of Nijsxo in 2017 as part of a commemorative ceremony for the 25th anniversary of Ingushetia's status as a republic.
