= Ingush Independence Committee =

Separatist Organization

Committee of Ingush Independence
- Ğalğay Kortamuq̇alen Komitet (Ingush); Комитет Ингушской Независимости (Russian)
- Flag of the Ingush Liberation Army
- Formation: 7 January 2023
- Purpose: Ingush nationalism
- Headquarters: Istanbul, Turkey
- Region served: Ingushetia, Russia
- Leader: Ansar Garkho
- Key people: Magomed Torijev
- Affiliations: Free Nations of Post-Russia Forum
- Website: https://t.me/komitet_ing

The Ingush Independence Committee or Committee of Ingush Independence (Ingush: Ğalğay Kortamuq̇alen Komitet, Russian: Комитет Ингушской Независимости, romanized: Komitet Ingushskoy Nezavisimosti) is an Ingush separatist organization founded on 7 January 2023 by Ingush diaspora in Turkey.

== History ==
The committee was founded on 7 January 2023 in Istanbul by Ingush nationalists living in Turkey. The creation of the movement was supported by Oleksiy Goncharenko, a member of the Verkhovna Rada.

The movement participated in the Free Nations of Post-Russia Forum, which was held in the European parliament in January 2023.

In May 2023, the government of Ingushetia started charging known members of the organization with supporting the Caucasus Emirate and justification of Nazism.

The armed wing of the movement, the Ingush Liberation Army, was created in April 2023.

In September 2023, the head of the Ingush Independence Committee, Ansar Garkho, held his first official meeting in the Crimean Tatar Mejlis with the head of the Mejlis Refat Chubarov and Mustafa Dzhemilev, the leader of the Crimean Tatar national movement.

In February 2024 the Committee praised a resolution by Ukraine's Verkhovna Rada calling for Ingush self-determination, and condemning the Stalinist deportations of the Ingush.

On May 3, 2024, the Ministry of Justice of Russia added the Ingush Independence Committee to the list of undesirable organizations.

== Goals ==
The committee does not claim to be a political party and does not have a specific ideology, it seeks to unite all Ingush people who support an independent state.

The organization is against the 2018 border changes and seeks to return the lost territories.

The committee is against unification with other countries and refused an offer from the Chechen government in exile which would unify the two states, if they become independent, into a North Caucasian Confederation.

== Bibliography ==
- Bifolchi, G. (2023-04-28). "Ingush activists created the Ingush Liberation Army". www.specialeurasia.com. ISSN 2785-2598.
- ""Деоккупация и полная независимость": что известно о создании Комитета Ингушской независимости за рубежом" ["De-occupation and complete independence": what is known about the creation of the Committee of Ingush Independence abroad]. Fortanga (in Russian). 2023-01-09.
- "В Комитете ингушской независимости заявили, что не имеют отношения к проекту "Горской республики", представленной Закаевым" [The Committee of Ingush Independence stated that they have no relation to the project of the “Mountain Republic” presented by Zakayev]. Fortanga (in Russian). 2023-03-21.
- ""Из Ингушетии обращаются почти каждый день": в КИН рассказали подробности создания армии" ["They come from Ingushetia almost every day": KIN told details of the creation of the army]. Fortanga (in Russian). 2023-04-26.
- Mchedlishvili, L. (2023-05-02). "Ingush blogger charged with 'justifying' Caucasus Emirate". OC Media.
- "В Турции прошел съезд сторонников независимости Ингушетии. Они заявили о создании объединения" [A congress of supporters of the independence of Ingushetia was held in Turkey. They announced the creation of an association]. Radio Free Europe/Radio Liberty (in Russian). 2023-01-08.
- Shevchuk, M. (2023-09-22). "Борцы за независимость Ингушетии от России впервые встретились с представителями Верховной Рады" [Fighters for the independence of Ingushetia from Russia met for the first time with representatives of the Verkhovna Rada]. Obozrevatel (in Russian).
- "Imperial Russia: Prospects for Deimperialization and Decolonization 31/01/2023 European Parliament". 31 January 2023 – via YouTube.

== See also ==
- National liberation struggle of the Ingush people
- Magomed Torijev
- Recognition of the genocide of the Ingush people
