= Ingush nationalism =

Belief that Ingush people should constitute a nation

The Flag of Ingushetia

Ingush nationalism is the belief that the Ingush people should constitute a nation. Ingush nationalism has been variously utilised as both a secular and Islamist concept at various times, and has become particularly important since the dissolution of the Soviet Union and the 1992 East Prigorodny conflict with North Ossetia.

== History ==
Modern Ingush nationalism emerged in the mid-1950s, following the 1944 deportation of the Chechens and Ingush and Ingush being subsequently allowed to return. Much of Ingush land had been repopulated by Ossetian settlers in the period between their deportation and their return, and three days of massive violence broke out before the Soviet government restored order. Ingush nationalism continued largely among underground Sufi brotherhoods, with occasional public events such as the 1973 Grozny meeting strengthening public nationalist sentiments.

Amidst Perestroika and the dissolution of the Soviet Union, Ingush nationalists began to publicly organise, forming organisations such as Nijsxo and the Congress of the Ingush People in an effort to secure their autonomy separately from Chechnya (which was then united with Ingushetia as the Chechen-Ingush ASSR) and retake Prigorodny District. This ultimately resulted in the establishment of modern Ingushetia in 1992. Rising Ingush and Ossetian nationalism culminated in the 1992 East Prigorodny conflict, which resulted in the ethnic cleansing of Prigorodny District's Ingush population by North Ossetian and Russian forces. As a response, Ingush nationalism and anti-Russian sentiment sharply increased, and in 1994 the region's nationalist leaders urged eventual independence.

Ruslan Aushev, the first President of Ingushetia, was elected in 1993 by a coalition of Ingush nationalist groups. An ideological secularist, he came into conflict with Islamist militant forces, which were spreading from the Middle East to the Caucasus. His 2002 removal and replacement by Murat Zyazikov led Ingush to turn to Jihadism, leading to the beginning of the insurgency in Ingushetia. Zyazikov's own removal in 2008 was met with widespread celebration among Ingush, and Caucasus experts such as Ivan Sukhov and Valery Dzutsati speculated that his replacement, Yunus-bek Yevkurov, would pursue Ingush nationalist policies to deescalate the conflict and bring stability to the republic. Yevkurov called for the return of Ingush refugees to Prigorodny District in a first for a republican leader. In response, the jihadist Caucasus Emirate declared that the Vilayat Galgayche would hold control over all of North Ossetia. Both the Caucasus Emirate and pro-Russian Ingush forces used Ingush nationalism during the insurgency in the North Caucasus.

The 2018 Chechnya–Ingushetia border agreement was met with widespread protests in Ingushetia, amidst the formalisation of the border and rumours that Chechnya would receive much more land than publicly declared. The Ingush Independence Committee, an Ingush nationalist organisation, was formed in 2023.
