= 2018–2019 Ingushetia protests =

2018–2019 protests against border agreements in Ingushetia, Russia

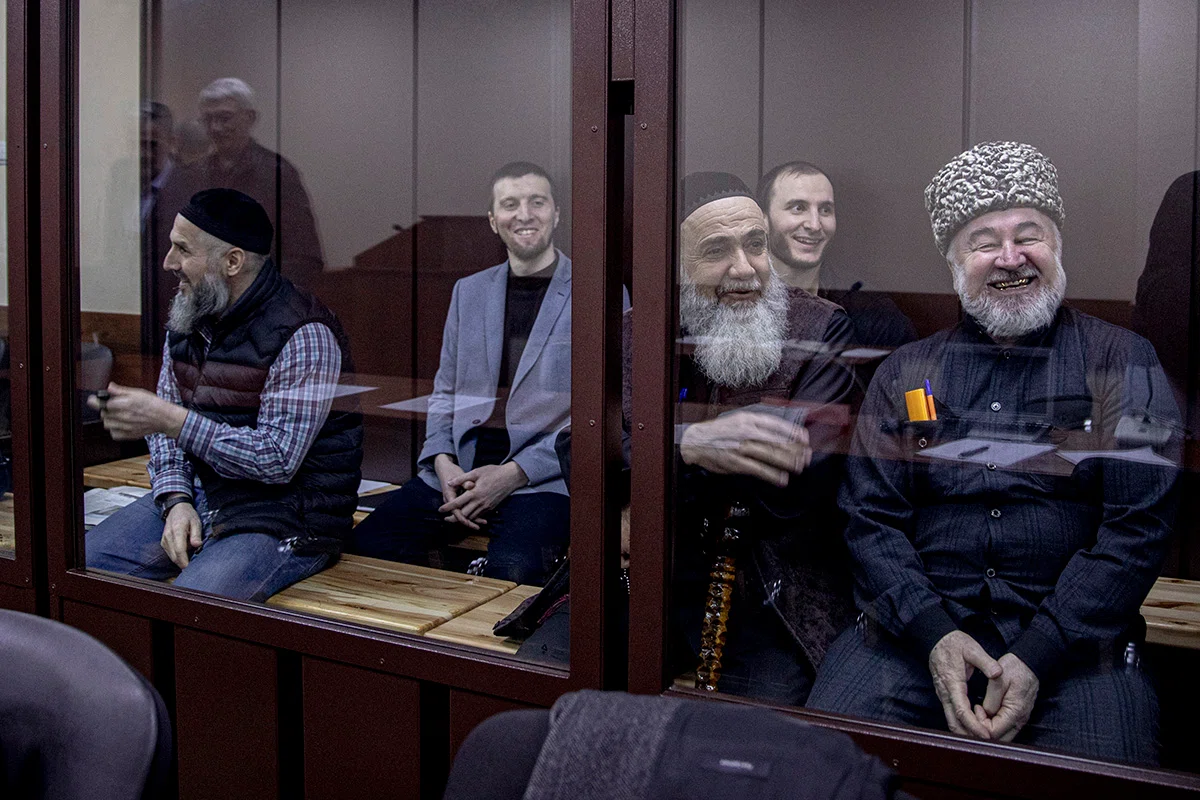
- Protest leaders following their arrest: Musa Malsagov, Akhmed Barakhoyev, Malsag Uzhakhov, Ismail Nalgiyev, and Bagaudin Khautiyev
- Date: 4 October – 27 November 2018 (first wave); 26–27 March 2019 (second wave)
- Location: Magas, Ingushetia, Russia
- Caused by: 2018 Chechnya–Ingushetia border agreement
- Goals: Prevention of the border agreement's ratification; Resignation of Yunus-bek Yevkurov
- Result: Protest failure and government crackdown

Parties
Protesters	Government of Russia; Ingushetia; Chechnya

Lead figures
Zarifa Sautieva; Akhmed Barakhoyev	Yunus-bek Yevkurov; Ramzan Kadyrov

The 2018-2019 protests in Ingushetia are thousands of people, initially unauthorized round-the-clock protest in Magas against the Agreement on Securing the Border Between Regions, signed by the head of Ingushetia Yunus-Bek Yevkurov and the head of Chechnya, Ramzan Kadyrov on 26 September 2018, as well as its ratification by the deputies of the People's Assembly of the Republic of Ingushetia. The protest began on 4 October 2018 and was declared indefinite. On the fifth day, the rally was sanctioned by the authorities until 15 October. The break of the round-the-clock protest lasted from 18 to 31 October 2018. The next rally took place on 27 November 2018, on the day of the consideration by the Constitutional Court of Russia of the request of the head of the Republic of Ingushetia, Yunus-Bek Yevkurov, on the compliance of the Constitution of the Russian Federation with the Agreement on the Establishment of the Administrative Boundary between Ingushetia and Chechnya. After a four-month break on 26 March 2019, the rally in Magas was resumed and declared indefinite.

== Background ==
At the end of August 2018, some public and human rights organizations in Ingushetia announced construction work on the territory of Ingushetia near the administrative border with Chechnya in the region of the Fortanga River, carried out by Chechen road organizations accompanied by Chechen security officials without the consent of the Ingush authorities, as well as with the leadership of the state nature reserve Erzi, to which this territory belongs. According to the press secretary of the head of Chechnya, Alvi Karimov, near the border with Ingushetia, the Chechen side began reconstruction work on the road, which, as he noted, was previously destroyed in connection with military actions, and that residents of both republics will be able to use it in the future. Representatives of the Ingush side who visited the site noted that the Chechen road workers carried out work on cutting down valuable tree species, destroying the fertile soil layer, changing the natural landscape on the territory of Ingushetia, and also that the Chechen security forces made an attempt to establish a traffic police post of the Ministry of Internal Affairs in Chechnya in the area of the village of Arshty, Sunzhensky District of the Republic of Ingushetia, two kilometers from borders, deep into Ingushetia.

A week later, the inhabitants of Ingushetia were outraged by the fact that road work on the Ingush territory (the Erzi reserve) not only did not stop, but also advanced 15 kilometers deep into Ingushetia. Indignation was also caused by the silence of the Ingush authorities about the events carried out by the Chechen road organizations and security forces. On 25 September, the head of the Sunzhensky region of Ingushetia, Isa Khashagulgov, announced his voluntary resignation. On the same day, a spontaneous gathering of about 70 people took place near the building of the district administration, outraged by the upcoming signing of the agreement by the heads of Ingushetia and Chechnya and the possible transfer of a part of the Sunzhensky district of Ingushetia to the Chechen Republic. However, the leaders of both republics kept this information and the fact of reaching agreements on the border secret.

== Agreement ==
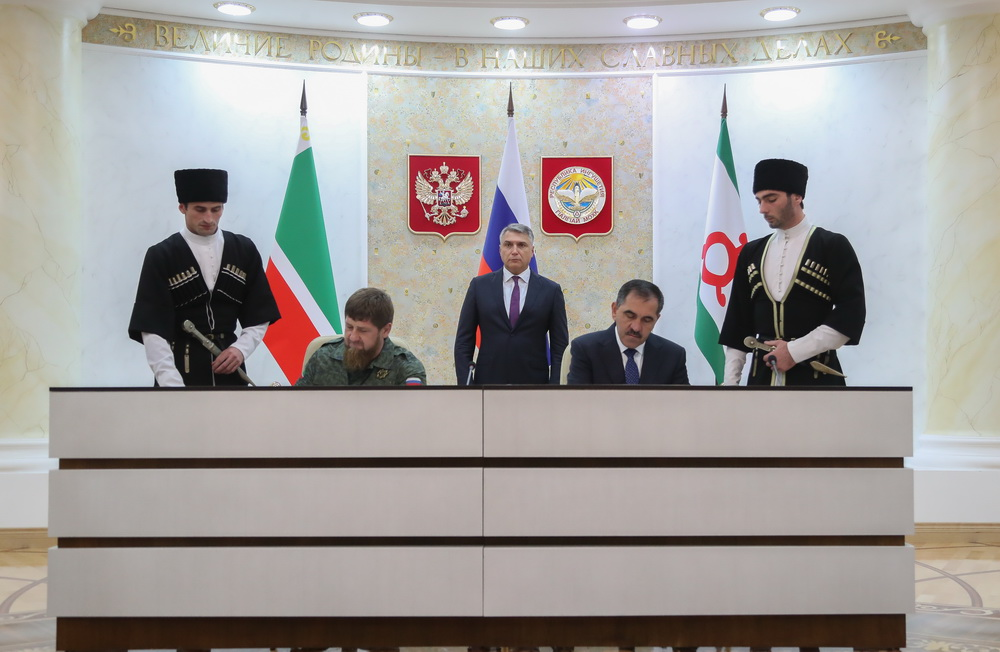
The signing of the 2018 Chechnya–Ingushetia border agreement. From left to right: Chechen leader Ramzan Kadyrov, Aleksandr Matovnikov, and Ingush leader Yunus-bek Yevkurov

On 26 September, the day of the signing of the Agreement on the Establishment of the Border Between Ingushetia and Chechnya, about 50 people gathered in Sunzha and over a hundred people in Magas. The entrances to the city were blocked by concrete blocks, a Rosgvardia column was introduced, in addition, the Internet was turned off during a protest in Magas and Nazran. However, despite the protests, the signing of the agreement between Yevkurov and Kadyrov took place. The leadership of the Republic of Ingushetia announced that by signing this agreement with the head of Chechnya, they made an equivalent exchange of land. However, the Ingush public was outraged by the fact that the Head of Ingushetia promoted agreements on the borders with the leadership of Chechnya secretly from society, as well as the fact that part of the Sunzhensky region of Ingushetia, according to agreements between the heads of the republics, departs to Chechnya.

The fact that according to the agreement between Yevkurov and Kadyrov, the exchange of lands is unequal, was confirmed by independent expert cartographers. Thus, under the agreement between Yevkurov and Kadyrov, more than 25 times more land is transferred to Chechnya than Ingushetia. On 27 September, Russian presidential press secretary Dmitry Peskov, answering a question about possible consultations with the Kremlin in the process of signing an agreement on fixing the administrative border between the republics of Chechnya and Ingushetia, said that it was held on the initiative of the subjects themselves. They made an equivalent exchange of land.

== Protests ==
On 4 October, early in the morning, citizens began to gather near the building of the Parliament of Ingushetia. Thus began the protest of the Ingush against the Agreement on Securing the Border, signed by the heads of Ingushetia and Chechnya, as well as its ratification by the deputies of the Parliament of Ingushetia. An examination of the relevant was scheduled for that date. In turn, the Constitutional Court of the Republic of Ingushetia in its response to the draft law "On approval of the Agreement on the establishment of the border between the Republic of Ingushetia and the Chechen Republic" ruled that the draft law under consideration is not subject to consideration by the People's Assembly of the Republic of Ingushetia. In accordance with Article 111 of the Constitution of the Republic of Ingushetia, education, the abolition of administrative-territorial units and formations, the establishment and change of borders between them, their name and renaming, other issues of the administrative-territorial structure of the Republic of Ingushetia are resolved in accordance with federal laws and laws of the Republic of Ingushetia, taking into account the opinion of the population of the corresponding territory.

On 5 October a rally in Magas, the capital of Ingushetia, against the border agreement with Chechnya gathered, according to various estimates, from 10 to 60 thousand people. On 6 October the authorities of Ingushetia agreed on a rally, the participants of which oppose the definition of the administrative border with Chechnya with the transfer of part of the territory to the neighboring republic. The promotion was approved from 8 to 15 October. The document also states that, in accordance with the law, a public event cannot start earlier than 7:00 and end later than 22:00. On 7 October Ruslan Aushev, the first president of Ingushetia, came to the rally in Magas. He stated that the current leadership of Ingushetia made a mistake by not agreeing with the people on the transfer of land. On 13 October, the Government of Ingushetia agreed to hold a rally against the agreement on the border with Chechnya in Magas for two days - 16 and 17 October 2018.

On 17 October the Constitutional Court of the Republic of Ingushetia accepted for consideration the request of the deputies of the People's Assembly of the Republic of Ingushetia on the verification of the constitutionality of the Law of the Republic of Ingushetia dated 4 October 2018 No. 42-RZ "On approval of the Agreement on the establishment of the border between the Republic of Ingushetia and the Chechen Republic", as well as complaints from residents of the republic on violation of rights and freedoms by this law. On 24 October at about 22:00, representatives of the authorities of the Chechen Republic again visited Ingushetia. The Chairman of the Parliament of the Chechen Republic Magomed Daudov arrived in the village of Novy Redant with a visit to Elder Akhmed Barakhoev, the leader of the organizing committee of the protest rally. A crowd of a huge number of people formed in the courtyard of Akhmed Barakhoev for an hour — The Ingush, worried about Barakhoev's safety, gathered to support him. According to the elder, Magomed Daudov called him in advance and asked permission to come. Daudov notified Barakhoev that Ramzan Kadyrov was inviting him to the Sharia court in Chechnya. The invitation also concerned the former Minister of the Ministry of Internal Affairs of the Republic of Ingushetia, Akhmed Pogorov, who spoke out to the head of the Chechen Republic at the rally. Akhmed Barakhoev refused the invitation. As it turned out later, Magomed Daudov, before meeting with Akhmed Barakhoev, visited the house of the Mufti of Ingushetia Isa Khamkhoev, but did not find him there. Daudov recorded a video against the background of Khamkhoev's court, commenting on the absence of the mufti. According to Magomed Daudov, Khamkhoev did not answer his calls. Daudov suggested that the mufti was deliberately hiding.

On 27 October the Mufti of Ingushetia Isa Khamkhoev condemned Magomed Daudov's visit to his home and declared: "If you come to me again, then I am not responsible for my youth!" On 29 October two deputies of the People's Assembly of the Republic of Ingushetia withdrew from the Constitutional Court of the Republic of Ingushetia a request to check the Law on the approval of the border with Chechnya; a petition was also filed to disqualify the chairman of the Constitutional Court of Ingushetia Ayup Gagiev. However, this is not a reason to cancel the court hearing on this issue. The Constitutional Court of Ingushetia confirmed that the meeting on the legality of the Law on approving the border agreement with Chechnya will be held on Tuesday 30 October 2018, the meeting is scheduled to begin at 10:00 a.m. Gunfire was heard during demonstrations in Magas.

In response to complaints from residents of the Republic of Ingushetia, Roskomnadzor reported that operators of the "Big Three" disabled mobile Internet in Ingushetia for the period from 4 to 17 October 2018 due to "a reasoned decision of law enforcement agencies". On November 17, the Government of the Republic of Ingushetia agreed to hold a rally against the Agreement on the Establishment of the Administrative Boundary between Ingushetia and the Chechen Republic on 27 November 2018 in the city of Nazran. The holding of the action was agreed upon subject to the requirements of federal and republican legislation on meetings, rallies, demonstrations, processions.

On 6 December at 10:00 am, a session of the Constitutional Court of the Russian Federation was held to announce the Court's Resolution on the constitutionality of the Agreement on the Establishment of the Administrative Boundary between Ingushetia and the Chechen Republic. A live broadcast from the courtroom was again organized on the official website of the Constitutional Court of the Russian Federation and on its official YouTube channel. Yunus-Bek Yevkurov, commenting on the decision of the Constitutional Court, said that the issue of establishing the border between Ingushetia and Chechnya had been finished, while Ramzan Kadyrov expressed the opinion that the Ingush and Chechen peoples, despite everything, will remain fraternal.

On 26 March 2019, the protests continued - in Magas, an agreed rally was held in front of the building of the state television and radio company Ingushetia, which, according to various estimates, gathered from 2 to 30 thousand people. According to eyewitnesses, the square was surrounded by the police, and mobile internet was turned off in the area where the rally was held. Single pickets were held in Moscow. Despite the fact that the rally was approved by the authorities only on March 26, the protesters refused to disperse and remained in the square overnight. On 27 March the rally in Magas was again declared indefinite. On the morning of 27 March Rosgvardia officers began dispersing the protest action, protesters threw stones and chairs at the security forces, and clashes occurred. After that, the authorities made concessions and allowed the protesters to hold a new rally in five days, people began to disperse. The protesters later entered the Caucasus federal highway, blocking it.

On 23 April at the Mineralnye Vody Airport (Stavropol Krai), the applicant for a new rally in Ingushetia, activist Khasan Katsiyev, was detained, and in Magas, activist Akhmed Nalgiev. The Nalchik City Court of Kabardino-Balkaria arrested Khasan Katsiev and Akhmed Nalgiyev, suspects under part 2 of Article 318 of the Criminal Code (use of violence against government officials) for two months.

== Prosecution ==
After the protests several criminal cases were initiated against the participants, collectively known as the Ingush Affair (Ингушское дело). Criminal cases were opened under articles on mass riots and the use of violence against security forces, but only accusations in violence against security were advanced. In January 2020 the leaders of the protests were accused of the organization of and participating in an extremist network.

== See also ==
- War in Ingushetia
- National liberation struggle of the Ingush people
