= List of chairmen of the People's Assembly of the Republic of Ingushetia =

List of chairmen of the People's Assembly of the Republic of Ingushetia.

This is a list of chairmen (speakers) of the People's Assembly of the Republic of Ingushetia:

Name	Entered office	Left office
Murat Keligov	1994	1995
Ruslan Pliyev	July 20, 1995	December 19, 2003
Makhmud Sakalov	December 19, 2003	December 4, 2011
Mukharbek Dikazhev	2011	2016
Zelimkhan Evloev	October 3, 2016	Incumbent
