= Recognition of crimes against the Ingush people =

Recognition of crimes against the Ingush people refers to attempts to have the Soviet Union's forcible relocation of Chechens and Ingush people from the Checheno-Ingush Autonomous Soviet Socialist Republic to Central Asia in 1944 declared a genocide.

International activism in support of recognition increased around the 60th anniversary in 2004, and in 2023 the Ukrainian legislature formally recognised the 1944 genocide and the right of the Inkush people to restore their territorial integrity.

== Background ==
From 23 February to 9 March 1944, in an operation known as Operation Lentil, the Soviet security forces of the time (the NKVD) deported most of the Ingush and Chechen population from the Checheno-Ingush Autonomous Soviet Socialist Republic to Central Asia. The Soviet government stated that the deportation of what is estimated to be about 650,000 people was carried out because of their alleged collaboration with Nazi Germany. After the operation, the Chechen-Ingush Autonomous Soviet Socialist Republic was abolished, and its territory was redistributed among neighbouring administrative units.

According to witnesses, the security forces raped women and girls in public before the deportation, and killed others during it. Approximately one-third of the deportees died during transit or in the first months of resettlement in the new territories, due to harsh weather, food shortages, and limited access to medical care. So although February 23 is observed as "Defender of the Fatherland Day" in Russia, the Ingush refer to it as "the black day of the calendar."

== International activism ==
Assessments of the deportation and its legal classification differ among scholars and institutions, as objective statistics on the number of victims and survivors are unavailable. However, the sixtieth anniversary of the deportation in 2004 was widely commemorated in Europe with events being held in a number of cities.

In Saratov, a ceremony at the central mosque was organised by Chechen and Ingush religious and cultural figures, in which Russian community leaders and activists also participated. In Nazran, civil society organisations issued a statement in support of Italy’s Radical MEP Olivier Dupuis' 36-day hunger strike over the issue. In Moscow, following a small demonstration in front of the Federal Security Service headquarters, police dispersed the crowd and briefly detained Lev Ponomaryov, head of the Movement for Human Rights, and Nikolai Khramov, leader of the Russian Radical Party. In St. Petersburg, a gathering of human rights defenders near the Solovetsky Stone on Troitskaya Square was disrupted by provocations from self-described skinheads. And on 26 February 2004, the European Parliament recognised the deportation as an act of genocide, although other international bodies have not adopted the same position.

Efforts to have the deportation recognised as a genocide more widely have continued since 2004. In 2012, human rights activist Ibrahim Lianov submitted an appeal to the Georgian Parliament asking it to recognise the 1944 deportation as genocide. And on 7 January 2023, in Istanbul, Ahmad Ozdo (Ozdoev), a representative of the Ingush Independence Committee (IIC), together with Ingush activists, announced the Declaration of Independence of Ingushetia, calling for international recognition of the 1944 deportation and condemnation of the 1992 killings in Ingushetia.

== Ukrainian recognition ==
In 2023, several members of the Verkhovna Rada legislature of Ukraine introduced a bill recognising the Ingush people's right to statehood. The bill also condemned the 1944 deportation and the division of territories inhabited by the Ingush, and supported the Ingush people's right to restore their territorial integrity.

The draft law was proposed by deputies from multiple political factions, including Servant of the People, For the Future, Batkivshchyna, European Solidarity, and Voice. Among the members of parliament behind the bill were Yaroslav Yurchyshyn, chairman of the Verkhovna Rada Committee on Freedom of Speech and chairman of the Temporary Special Commission on the Development of State Policy on the Enslaved Peoples of the Russian Federation; Mykyta Poturayev, chairman of the Committee on Humanitarian and Information Policy; and Valentyn Nalyvaichenko, secretary of the Committee on Ukraine's Integration into the EU. A number of legal experts collaborated with Ukrainian members of parliament in drafting the bill, including Ukrainian international lawyer Professor Volodymyr Vasylenko and Ansar Garhko, chairman of the Ingush Independence Committee (IIC), with the drafting process reportedly taking about six months.

In December 2023, a resolution recognising the Ingush genocide was introduced into the Verkhovna Rada by the people's deputy of Ukraine S.O.Taruta and other deputies, and on 23 February 2024 the Ukrainian legislature adopted the draft resolution entitled "On Recognition of the Right of the Ingush People to Establish an Independent Sovereign National State, Condemnation of Russia's Crimes against the Ingush and Restoration of the Territorial Integrity of Ingushetia" (registration no. 10344, dated 14 December 2023). The resolution condemned Russia's actions against the Ingush – including the deportation in 1944 – the division of Ingush-inhabited territory, the destruction of Ingush national identity, and the 1992 killings of Ingush. It also called for recognition of the Ingush people's right to an independent sovereign state, restoration of territorial integrity, and international solidarity with them. A total of 248 deputies voted in favor of the resolution. The parliament then instructed its chairman Ruslan Stefanchuk to send the resolution to all members of the international community, and to urge them to both support the Ingush people and condemn Russia's crimes against them.

On 28 February 2024, the resolution of the international conference dedicated to the 80th anniversary of the deportation of the Chechen and Ingush peoples was unanimously adopted in Kyiv.
