= 1991 Ingush referendum =

- 30 November 1991
- Are you in favor of the establishment of the Ingush Republic within the Russian Federation with the return of the seized land and with the capital in the city of Vladikavkaz?

Results
Choice	Votes	%
Yes	89,661	94.31%
No	5,406	5.69%
Valid votes	95,067	98.14%
Invalid or blank votes	1,806	1.86%
Total votes	96,873	100.00%
Registered voters/turnout	131,834	73.48%

A referendum on creating the Republic of Ingushetia within Russian Federation was held in Ingushetia on 30 November 1991.

== Question ==
Are you in favor of the establishment of the Ingush Republic within the Russian Federation with the return of the seized land and with the capital in the city of Vladikavkaz?

== Background ==
Chechnya and Ingushetia were part of the Checheno-Ingush Soviet Socialist Republic within the Russian Soviet Federative Socialist Republic. On 7 September 1991, the pro-independence Chechen National Congress came to power in the republic. On 15 September 1991, the Assembly of Ingush Deputies passed a resolution, announcing secession from Checheno-Ingushetia to remain within the RSFSR. On 15 October, a referendum was announced to confirm this decision. The Ingush secession was accepted by the Chechen leadership and finalized on 4 June 1992 with the Russian law "On the Creation of the Ingush Republic in the Russian Federation".

The Ingush feared that joining the independent Chechnya would have meant compromising the territorial claims on Prigorodny District, which is a subject of a dispute between the Ingush and Ossetians. The Ingush lost the land following their deportation to Central Asia in 1944, and then recent Russian law On the Rehabilitation of Repressed Peoples, passed in April 1991, gave them hopes of returning the territory. However, the Russian law "On the Creation of the Ingush Republic in the Russian Federation" did not include the disputed lands within the newly created Republic of Ingushetia. The dispute remained unresolved and this soon led to the armed conflict in the region.

== Results ==
Choice	Votes	%
For	89,661	94.31
Against	5,406	5.69
Total	95,067	100.00
Valid votes	95,067	98.14
Invalid/blank votes	1,806	1.86
Total votes	96,873	100.00
Registered voters/turnout	131,834	73.48
