= Magomed Torijev =

Russian journalist (born 1978)

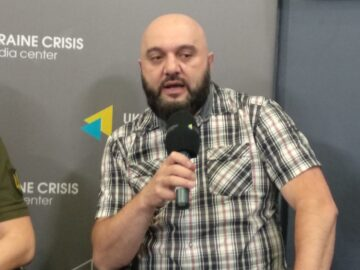
- Born: 20 February 1978 (age 48); Ingushetia, North Caucasia
- Occupations: journalist, human rights activist, authorized representative of the Ingush Independence Committee
- Awards: "For courage and objectivity in journalism"(12.01.2012) Ingushetia

Magomed Torijev (Note: Russian: Магомед Ториев, IPA: [məɡəmʲɪt tərʲɪ(j)ɪf]; Ingush: Торенаькъан Мухьмад, romanized: Torenäqhan Mux́mad) (also spelled Toriev; born 20 February 1978) is a journalist, human rights activist, expert on the North Caucasus and republics of the former Soviet Union. He's a representative of the Ingush opposition in Europe, an authorized representative of the Ingush Independence Committee, an organization whose main goal is to gain independence of Ingushetia from Russia. He worked for Radio Liberty/Free Europe, Prague Watchdog, Ingushetiya.org. He participated in the UN missions to Chechnya and Ingushetia, as well as in the OSCE mission to Ukraine.

== Biography ==
He was born on February 20, 1978, in Ingushetia.

- 2001–2003 – WHO UN monitoring officer.
- 2003–2006 – worked as project coordinator at the Caucasian Refugee Council, a non-governmental organization (a UNHCR implementing partner). He ensured the protection of the council's staff and property from attacks and persecution by the Russian regime.
- 2008–2014 – was a representative of the Ingush opposition in Europe. He participated in the creation of the National Parliament of the opposition Ingushetia "Council of the Country".
- 2008–2010: worked as a freelance journalist, in particular, for Caucasus Times. He specialized in news and analysis on the South and North Caucasus.
- 2008–2010: worked with Prague Watchdog. Collected and disseminated information about the conflict in the North Caucasus.
- 2009–2014: was a freelance columnist for the Georgian service of Radio Liberty. He was engaged in writing review columns on the criminal actions of the leadership and security forces of Russia and the undemocratically proclaimed republics of the North Caucasus against indigenous peoples.
- 2014–2021: Deputy Head of the OSCE SMM patrol group. Participated in the identification of Russia's violations of international law and international agreements during the Russian military aggression in eastern Ukraine.
- In January 2022, he was elected as an advisor to the Office of the Supreme Commander-in-Chief of the Armed Forces of Ukraine V. Zaluzhny, but in February 2022, he was not approved for this position by the Czech Ministry of Defense due to the beginning of the full-scale Russian invasion of Ukraine.
- Since April 2023, he has been an Authorized Representative of the Ingush Independence Committee. He represents the Ingush Independence Committee at international forums. He is engaged in communication between the committee and other national movements for the liberation of peoples under Russian occupation, namely Buryatia and Tuva. In 2023, on the initiative of Magomed Toriyev, a draft resolution was created to recognize the right of the Ingush to an independent state and condemn Russia's crimes against the Ingush people. In February 2024, the Verkhovna Rada of Ukraine recognized the independence of Ingushetia.

=== Persecution ===
Since 2000, when Vladimir Putin came to power, the attempt to subjugate the media to the state has become a crucial element of the Kremlin's information dominance. In 2006, due to persecution by the authorities, the journalist was forced to emigrate to the Czech Republic, where he was granted political refugee status. Later he moved to Norway and lived there for a year, but faced an attempt by local authorities to extradite him to Russia. It was only through the intervention of non-governmental organizations such as Reporters Without Borders, the committee to Protect Journalists, and Human Rights Defender that he was able to obtain political asylum in Europe.

During his stay in Denmark (Odense), Magomed Torijev lived under the fictitious name Alex Tor for his own safety.

In 2023, the Ingush Independence Committee was founded. Magomed Torijev was one of the initiators of its creation. The committee operates mostly anonymously to avoid persecution of its members and their families and to protect them from possible abduction and torture by the Russian authorities.

In 2024, the Investigative Committee of the Russian Federation opened a criminal case against one of the representatives of the Ingushetia Independence Committee, Akhmet Gudiyev. According to a source, criminal cases are also going to be opened against other members of the committee, including Magomed Torijev, who is engaged in negotiations on behalf of the committee with other states.

== Awards/Achievements ==
- Nomination for the International Press Freedom Award (2010).
- Awards – "For courage and objectivity in journalism" (12.01.2012) Ingushetia (Russia).
- Book – An Island That Is Me, 2014, Denmark/Odense (author).
- Grants and scholarships – grants from the Heinrich Böll Foundation, September 2010, Langenbroich (Germany); Hamburg Scholarship for Politically Persecuted 2011–2012; ICORN 2012–2014 (journalist protection program).
