= People's Assembly of the Republic of Ingushetia =

Regional parliament of Ingushetia, Russia

Legislative Assembly of Republic of Ingushetia Народное Собрание Республики Ингушетия Гӏалгӏай Республика Халкъа Гуллам
- 7th legislature

Type
- Type: Unicameral

History
- Preceded by: Supreme Soviet of the Checheno-Ingush ASSR (until 1991); Congress of the Ingush People

Leadership
- Chairman: Magamet Djabrailovich Yandiev, United Russia

Structure
- Seats: 32
- Political groups: United Russia (27); SRZP (3); LDPR (2)

Elections
- Voting system: Proportional
- Last election: 19 September 2021
- Next election: 2026

Meeting place
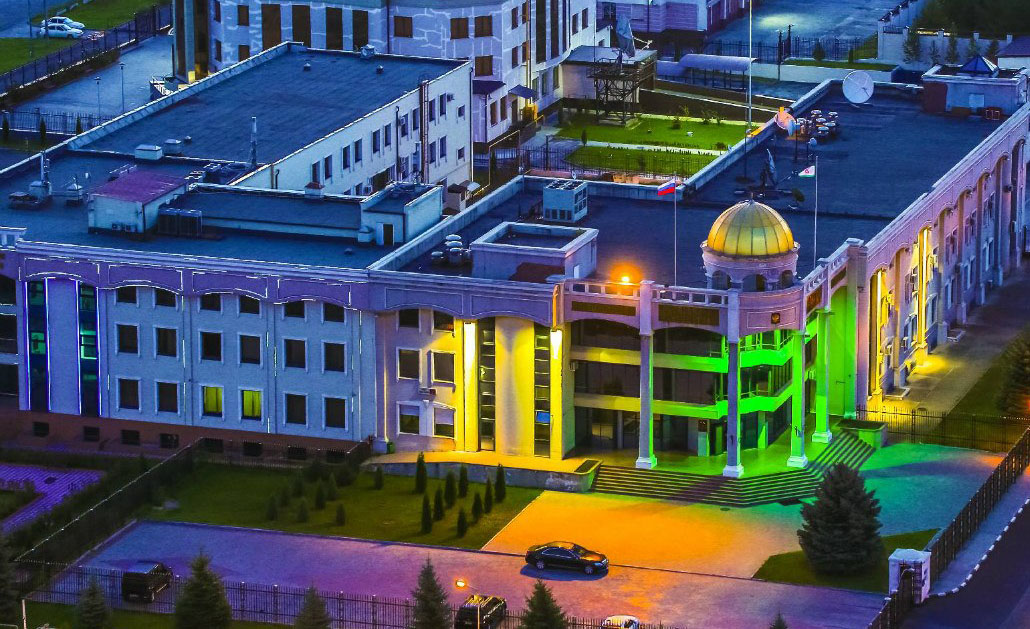
- 16 Zyazikova Street, Magas, Ingushetia

Website
- www.parlamentri.ru

The People's Assembly of the Republic of Ingushetia (Russian: Народное Собрание Республики Ингушетия, romanized: Narodnoye Sobraniye Respubliki Ingushetiya; Ingush: Гӏалгӏай Республика Халкъа Гуллам, romanized: Ghalghaj Respublika Xalq'a Gullam), sometimes referred to by the name of its predecessor, the Congress of the Ingush People (Russian: Съезд ингушского народа, romanized: Syezd ingushskogo naroda), is the regional parliament of Ingushetia, a federal subject of Russia. It consists of 32 deputies elected to five-year terms. Its presiding officer is the chairman.

== Elections ==
=== 2021 ===
Party	%	Seats
United Russia	82.10	27
A Just Russia — For Truth	7.90	3
Liberal Democratic Party of Russia	5.05	2
Registered voters/turnout	83.31	32

== Sources ==
- Official website of the People's Assembly of the Republic of Ingushetia

== See also ==
- List of chairmen of the People's Assembly of the Republic of Ingushetia
