= Ingush people in Turkey =

Ingush diaspora

Ingush in Turkey
Туркий мехкара гӀалгӀай Türkiyeli İnguşlar

Total population
- Estimated 85,000

Ingush people in Turkey (Note: Ingush: Туркий мехкара гӀалгӀай, romanized: Turkiy mexkara ġalġay, IPA: [ˈtʊɾkiː ˈmʲexkəɾə ˈɣəɫɣəɪ]; Turkish: Türkiyeli İnguşlar) number around 85,000 as of 2020.

== History ==
=== Background ===
The reason for the resettlement of Ingush to the Ottoman Turkey was mainly due to shortage of land. The land plots of the lowlanders of Ingush okrug were much larger than those of the mountaineers, but they were also insufficient for the subsistence level as noted by Commission on personal and land rights of the natives of the Terek region in 1865. Regarding the size of the allotment per household of Nazranians, the Commission stated that "is in no way considered satisfactory by the commission."

After the Caucasian War in 1865, some of the Ingush resettled (completed so called muhacirdom) to the Ottoman Empire. In total, 1454 Ingush families were evicted from Ingushetia, out of which 1366 were from the Orstkhoy society and 88 families from the Nazranian society. As a result of this resettlement, the Karabulak uchastok of the Ingush okrug was liquidated as its previous inhabitants left and the uchastok became deserted.

Later, Ingush also settled to Turkey in the following years: in 1877–1878, 1886–1887, 1892, 1895, 1900, 1902, 1904 and 1912.

=== Modern ===
In Turkey, the Ingush are mostly settled in the cities of Ankara, Areliya, Bursa, İzmir, Kayseri, Konya, Kiziltepe, Mardin, Mersin, Muş, Sivas, Istanbul, Golcuk and Yalova.

In Turkey, Ingush were recorded under the ethnonym Circassians.

== Notable people ==
- Saim Polatkan (1908 – 1991), Turkish officer, athlete, champion of Central Europe, participant in the 1936 Summer Olympics in Berlin
- Suleiman Syrr Koydemir (Beshtoev) (1886 – 1923), Turkish statesman, first mayor of Beysehir.
- Maksharif Beshtav (1913 – 2010), historian (dr. of historical sciences), turkologist.
- Atila Tachoy (Tochiev) (1939 – 2001), dr. of medical sciences.

== Bibliography ==
=== Russian sources ===
- Albogachieva, M. S.-G. (2015). "Демаркация границ Ингушетии" [Demarcation of the borders of Ingushetia] (PDF). In Karpov, Yu. Yu. (ed.). Горы и границы: Этнография посттрадиционных обществ [Mountains and Borders: An Ethnography of Post-Traditional Societies] (PDF) (in Russian). SPb.: MAĒ RAN. pp. 168–255. ISBN 978-5-88431-290-6.
- Bazorkin, M. M. (2002) [1965]. Kurkiev, A. B. (ed.). История происхождения ингушей [History of the origin of the Ingush] (PDF) (in Russian). Nalchik: Ēl-Fa. pp. 1–290. ISBN 5-88195-554-4.
- Bruk, S. I. (1994). Tishkov, V. A.; et al. (eds.). Народы России: Энциклопедия [Peoples of Russia: Encyclopedia] (PDF) (in Russian). Moskva: Bolshaya rossiyskaya entsoklopediya. pp. 54–65.
- Dolgieva, M. B.; Kartoev, M. M.; Kodzoev, N. D.; Matiev, T. Kh. (2013). Kodzoev, N. D.; et al. (eds.). История Ингушетии [History of Ingushetia] (4th ed.). Rostov-Na-Donu: Yuzhnyy izdatelsky dom. pp. 1–600. ISBN 978-5-98864-056-1.
- "Турция" [Turkey]. Krugosvet (in Russian).
- Krupnov, E. I. (1939). "К истории Ингушии" [To the history of Ingushiya]. Vestnik drevney istorii (in Russian). 2 (7). Moskva: Izd-vo Akademii Nauk SSSR: 77–90.
- Polevoy, N. (2020-08-13). "Ингушская диаспора в Турции: Развитие экономических и социокультурных связей с Республикой Ингушетия" [Ingush diaspora in Turkey: Development of economic and sociocultural ties with the Republic of Ingushetia]. Ingushetia (in Russian). Magas, Ingushetia: GAU redaktsiya gazety "Ingushetia". Archived from the original on 2022-02-13.
- Stepanova, A. (2018-10-03). ""Люди башен": Как живут ингуши" ["People of the Towers": How the Ingush live]. Russia Beyond (in Russian). Moskva. Archived from the original on 2022-02-13.
- Yalkharoeva, M. A. (2020). "Ингушская диаспора в Турции и в странах Ближнего востока: Приглашение к диалогу" [Ingush diaspora in Turkey and the Middle East: An invitation to dialogue]. In Kodzoev, N. D. (ed.). Актуальные вопросы истории ингушей: Сборник статей [Current issues in the history of the Ingush: Collection of articles] (in Russian). Nazran: Kep. pp. 22–30. ISBN 978-5-4482-0075-5.
