= Mahmoud Sakalov =

Russian politician

- Махмуд Сакалов

3rd Chairman of the People's Assembly of the Republic of Ingushetia
- Incumbent
- Assumed office 19 December 2003
- Preceded by: Ruslan Pliev

Personal details
- Born: January 1, 1950 (age 76) Makinsk, Kazakh SSR, USSR
- Party: United Russia
- Children: 6
- Profession: lawyer; politician

Mahmoud Sultanovich Sakalov (Russian: Махмуд Султанович Сакалов; born January 1, 1950) is a Russian politician and lawyer of Ingush ethnicity. He is serving as the chairman of the People's Assembly of the Republic of Ingushetia.

== Biography ==
Sakalov was born in Makinsk, Kazakh SSR on January 1, 1950 to Ingush parents, who were deported out of the Soviet Union. The family eventually returned to Russia, where he graduated from the Odessa Technological Institute of Food industry in 1975. Since 1992, Sakalov started his political career, where he was Chairman of the Committee of the Food Processing Industry, and worked as Deputy Minister of Agriculture in Ingushetia. He did, at one point study law. Since 2003, Sakalov is chairman of the People's Assembly of the Republic of Ingushetia. Sakalov is a member of the United Russia party since 2002. He is married, and has six children.
