= 2018 Chechnya–Ingushetia border agreement =

Border agreement in Russia

The Chechnya–Ingushetia border agreement was a boundary delimitation deal concluded on 26 September 2018 between Ramzan Kadyrov and Yunus-bek Yevkurov, respectively, the heads of Chechnya and Ingushetia, two federal subjects of the Russian Federation located in the North Caucasus region. According to the agreement, Ingushetia transferred 340 square kilometres, that is, about 9% of its territory, to Chechnya. The territory, located in Ingushetia's Sunzhensky District, had been claimed by Chechnya for years, despite the 1993 and 2003 agreements between the two republics not to change the existing boundaries.

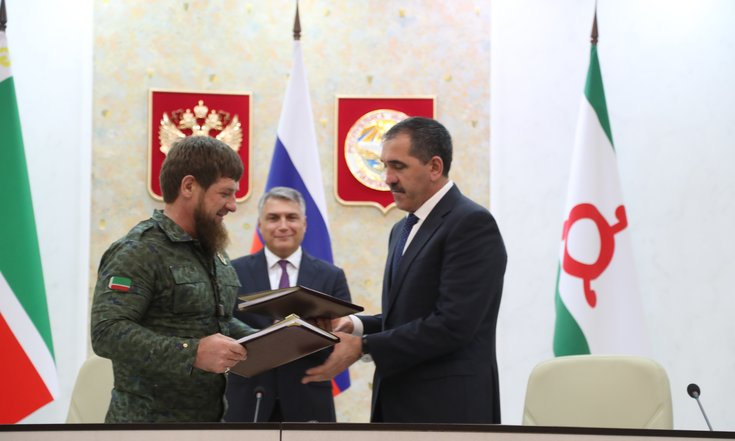
Head of Ingushetia Yunus-Bek Yevkurov and Chechen leader Ramzan Kadyrov in September 2018

The deal sparked widespread public opposition and protests in Ingushetia. On 30 October 2018 the Constitutional Court of Ingushetia ruled that the agreement was illegal as changes in the territory of Ingushetia required approval by referendum. Yunus-bek Yevkurov, the head of Ingushetia, took the issue to the Constitutional Court of Russia in Moscow, which overrode the local court's ruling in December 2018. A series of outdoor rallies erupted across Ingushetia immediately after the controversial border deal, accompanied by clashes with police and arrests of activists. The protests reinvigorated in March 2019. Amid the unrest, Yevkurov resigned on 24 June 2019.
