= Prigorodny District, North Ossetia–Alania =

Prigorodny District Пригородный район (Russian)
- District

Other transcription(s)
  - Ossetian: Горæтгæроны район
  - Ingush: ГӀалме Шахьар
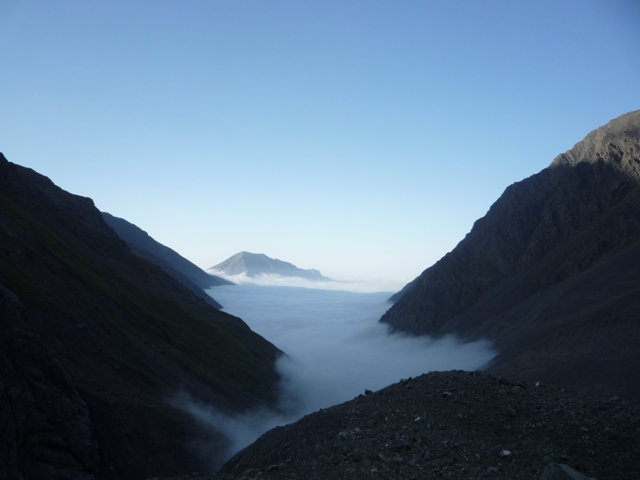
- Kolka-Karmadon rock ice slide in Prigorodny District
- Location of Prigorodny District in the Republic of North Ossetia–Alania
- Coordinates: 43°03′37″N 44°44′06″E
- Country: Russia
- Federal subject: Republic of North Ossetia–Alania
- Administrative center: Oktyabrskoye

Area
  - Total: 1,460 km^{2} (560 sq mi)

Population (2010 Census)
  - Total: 108,665
  - Density: 74.4/km^{2} (193/sq mi)
  - Urban: 0%
  - Rural: 100%

Administrative structure
  - Administrative divisions: 19 rural okrug
  - Inhabited localities: 31 rural localities

Municipal structure
  - Municipally incorporated as: Prigorodny Municipal District
  - Municipal divisions: 0 urban settlements, 19 rural settlements
- Time zone: UTC+3 (MSK)
- OKTMO ID: 90640000
- Website: http://oktyabrskoe.osetia.ru/

Prigorodny District (Russian: При́городный райо́н, romanized: Prigorodny Raion; Iron Ossetic: Горæтгæроны район, romanized: Gorætgærony Rajon; Ingush: ГӀалме Шахьар, romanized: Ghalme Shaꜧar) is an administrative and municipal district (raion), one of the eight in the Republic of North Ossetia–Alania, Russia. It is located in the east of the republic. The area of the district is 1,460 square kilometers (560 sq mi). Its administrative center is the rural locality (a selo) of Oktyabrskoye.

== History ==
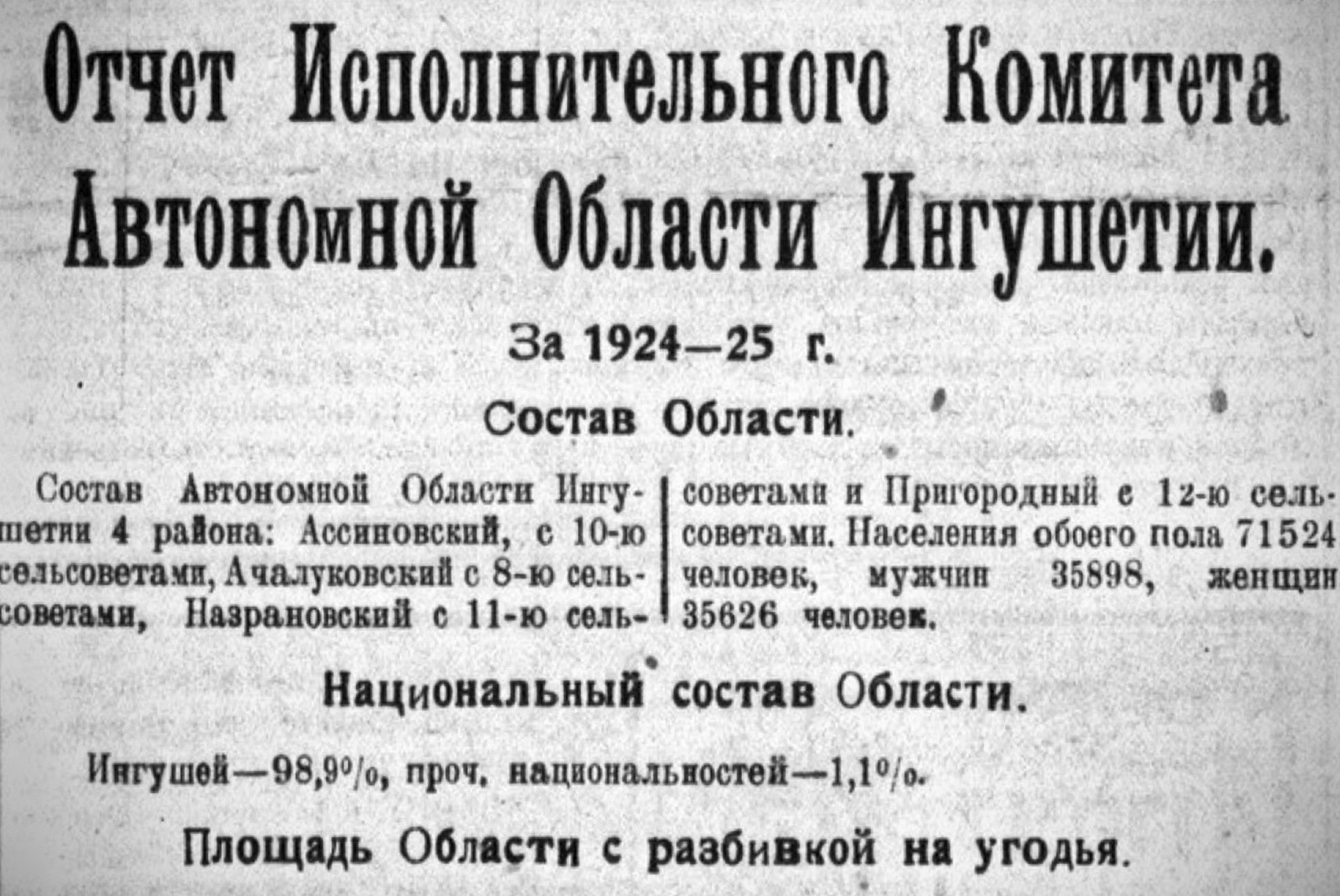
Report of the Executive Committee of the Ingush Autonomous Oblast for the years 1924-1925 showing the Ingush making up no less than 98,9% of the population of the Prigodorodny District.

One of the oldest centers of settlement of the Ingush on the plane is the Tarskoye Valley, the name of which derives from the villagers of Tärsh in the Armkhi Gorge. According to Georgian geographer Prince Vakhushti of Kartli, the village Angusht had already existed in the 18th century in the Tarskoye Valley. The exonym “Ingush” originated from this village.

As a result of the policy of the government of the Russian Empire in the North Caucasus, aimed at deporting the highlanders from part of the plains and foothill settlements, a strip was created on the lands that previously belonged to the Ingush, which was a line of Cossack villages, the Sunzha Line, dividing the plain from mountainous Ingushetia. In the middle of the 19th century, the Ingush were evicted from a number of villages located on the territory of the present-day Prigorodny district, after which the Cossack stanitsa Tarskaya was built on the site of the village Angusht. The same happened on other Ingush lands: on the site of the village Akhki-Yurt appeared the Sunzhenskaya stanitsa; on the site of the village Tauzen-Yurt — the Vorontsovsko-Dashkovskaya stanitsa; on the site of the village Akh-Borze — the Assinovskaya stanitsa, on the site of the village Mahmad-Khithe — the Voznesenskaya stanitsa; on the site of the village Alkhaste — the Feldmarshalskaya stanitsa; on the site of the village Ghazhara-Yurt — the Nesterovskaya stanitsa; on the site of the village Ildarkha-Ghala — the Karabulakskaya stanitsa; on the site of the village Ebarg-Yurt — the Troitskaya stanitsa; on the site of the village Sholkhi — the Tarskiy khutor, as well as the Sleptsovskaya, Datikhskaya, Mikhailovksya and Galashevskaya stanitsa's.

After decades of hostilities and skirmishes between the Cossack settlers and Ingush, the civil war of the early 20th century, in which the majority of the Ingush took up arms against the White Army during the Russian Revolution, became the main reason that the Cossack population from the above villages had to be deported, after which many of the occupied villages and lands were returned to the Ingush.

Until 1944, the eastern part of the modern Prigorodny District of was part of the Chechen-Ingush Autonomous Soviet Socialist Republic. On March 7, 1944, after the deportation of Chechens and Ingush to Kazakhstan and Central Asia, the territory was included in the North Ossetian Autonomous Soviet Socialist Republic. At the same time, the mountainous part of this territory (the southern region of present-day Ingushetia) was transferred to the Georgian SSR. On November 24, 1956, the Presidium of the Central Committee of the CPSU adopted a resolution on the restoration of the national autonomy of the Chechen and Ingush peoples, but the Prigorodny district remained part of North Ossetia.

Unlike the rest of the republic where Ossetians account for the majority of the population, the district has a significant Ingush population. The district in its eastern part is still considered a troublesome zone of the republic due to the high tensions between the Ingush and Ossetians.

== Demographics ==
Ethnic groups according to the 1939 national census of the USSR:

Nationality	Population	%
Ingush	28,132	83,35 %
Russians	3,549	10,51 %
Chechens	412	1,22 %
Ukrainians	398	1,18 %
Georgians	397	1,18 %
Ossetians	297	0,88 %
Tatars	108	0,32 %
Other	460	1,36 %
Total	33,753	100%

Ethnic groups according to the 2010 Russian census:

Nationality	Population	%
Ossetians	72,921	67,11 %
Ingush	23,254	21,40 %
Russians	9,436	8,68 %
Georgians	858	0,79 %
Armenians	569	0,52 %
Other	953	0,88 %
Unknown	674	0,62 %
Total	108,665	100%

Historical population

Year	Pop.	±%
1939	33,753	—
1970	65,506	+94.1%
1989	75,017	+14.5%

Year	Pop.	±%
2002	102,990	+37.3%
2010	108,665	+5.5%
2023	101 234	—

== Gallery ==
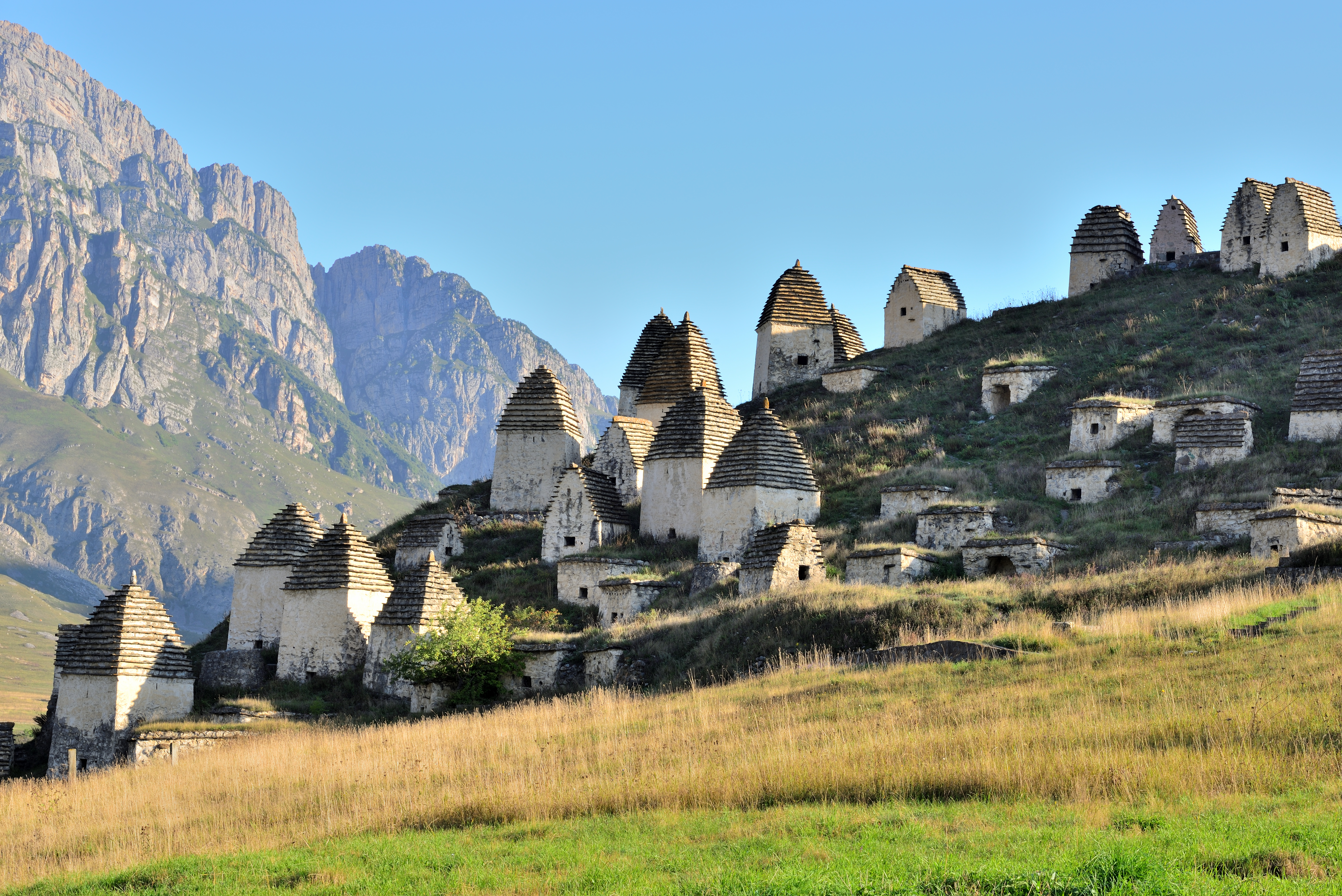
Architectural complex of crypt burial grounds (ancient necropolis). Dargavs.

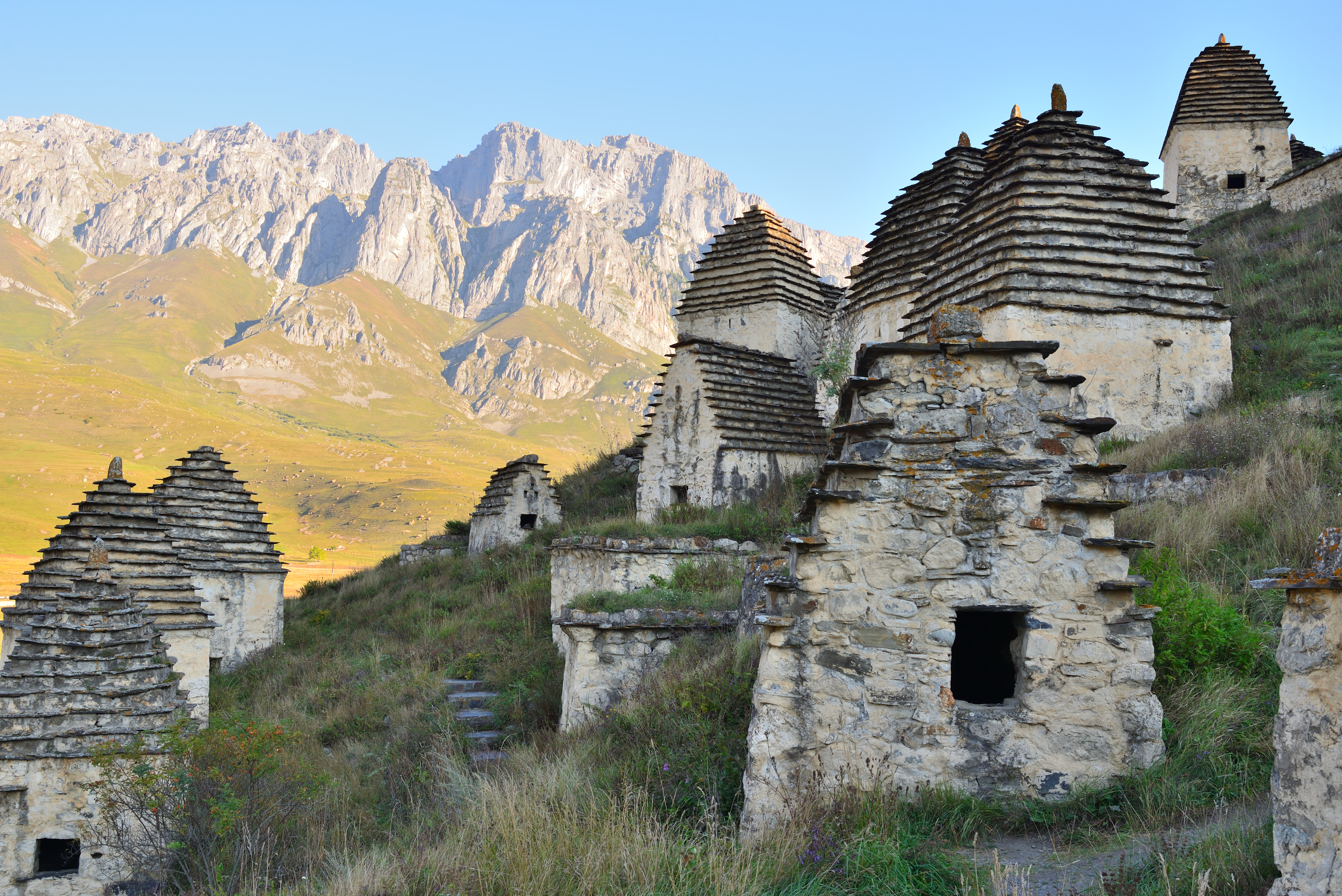
Crypt burial grounds (16-17 centuries). "Town of the dead" (ninety-five tombs)

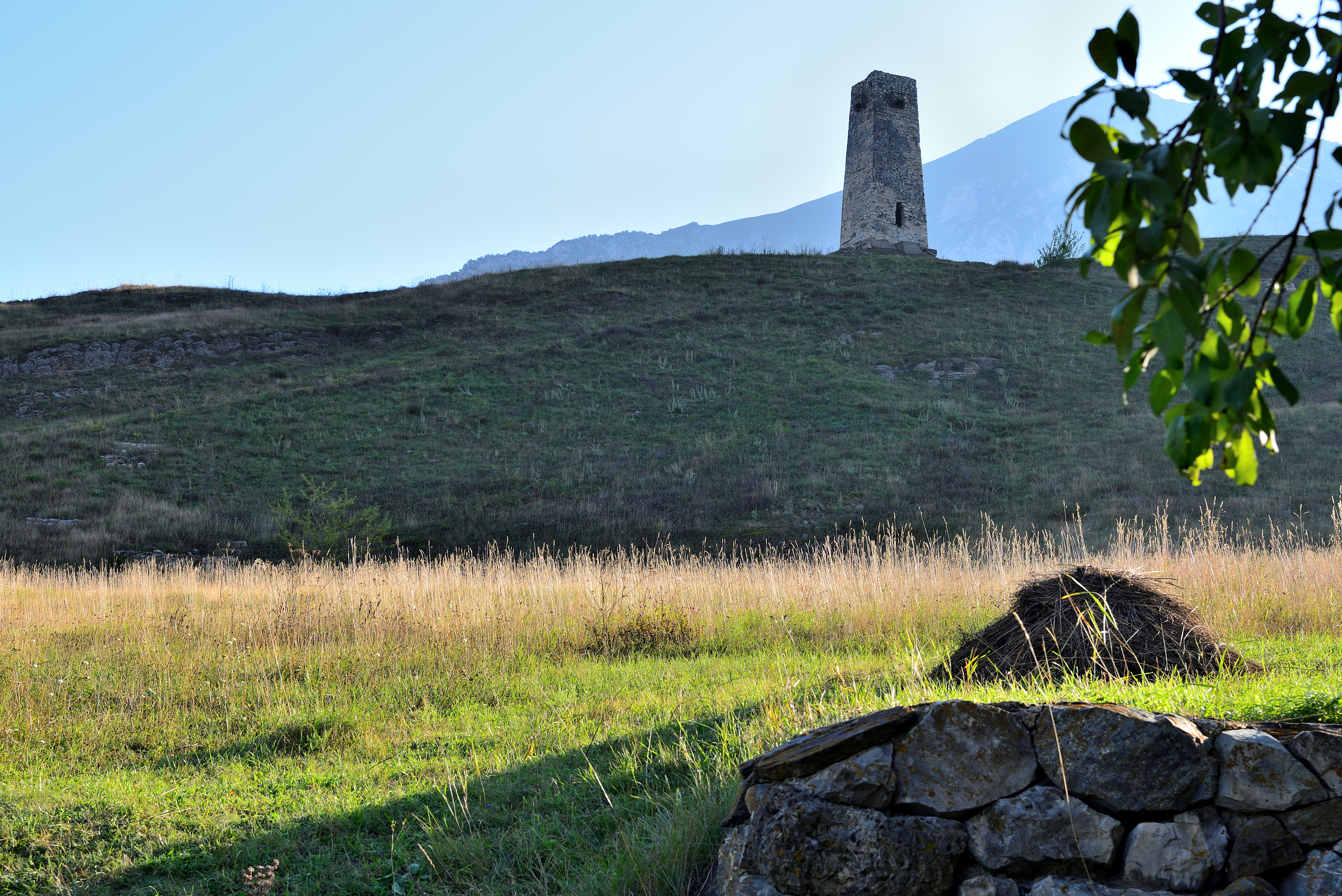
Tower guard Alikovich: the territory of "the Town of the Dead"

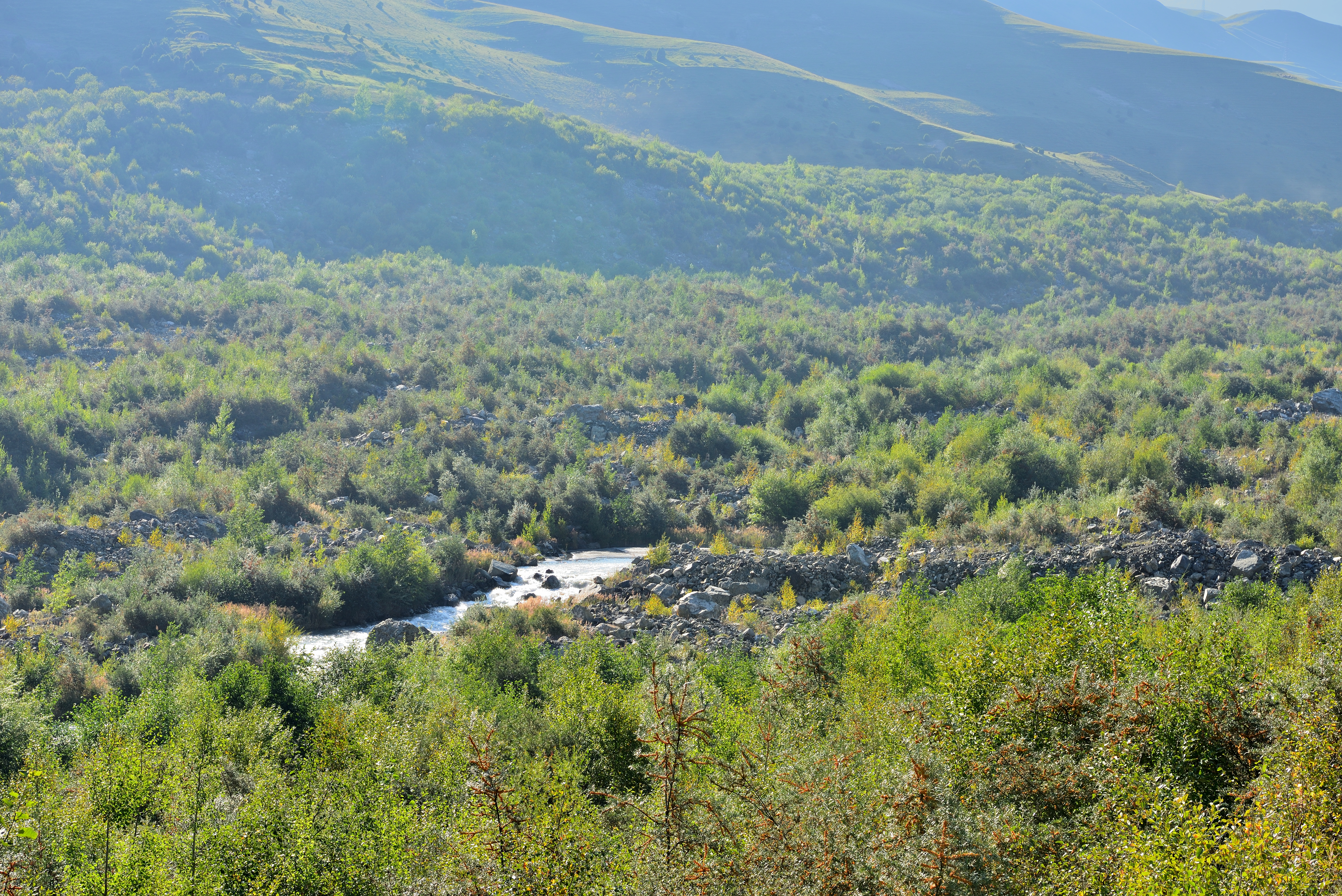
Karmadon. The section of the gorge after the descent of the Kolka glacier

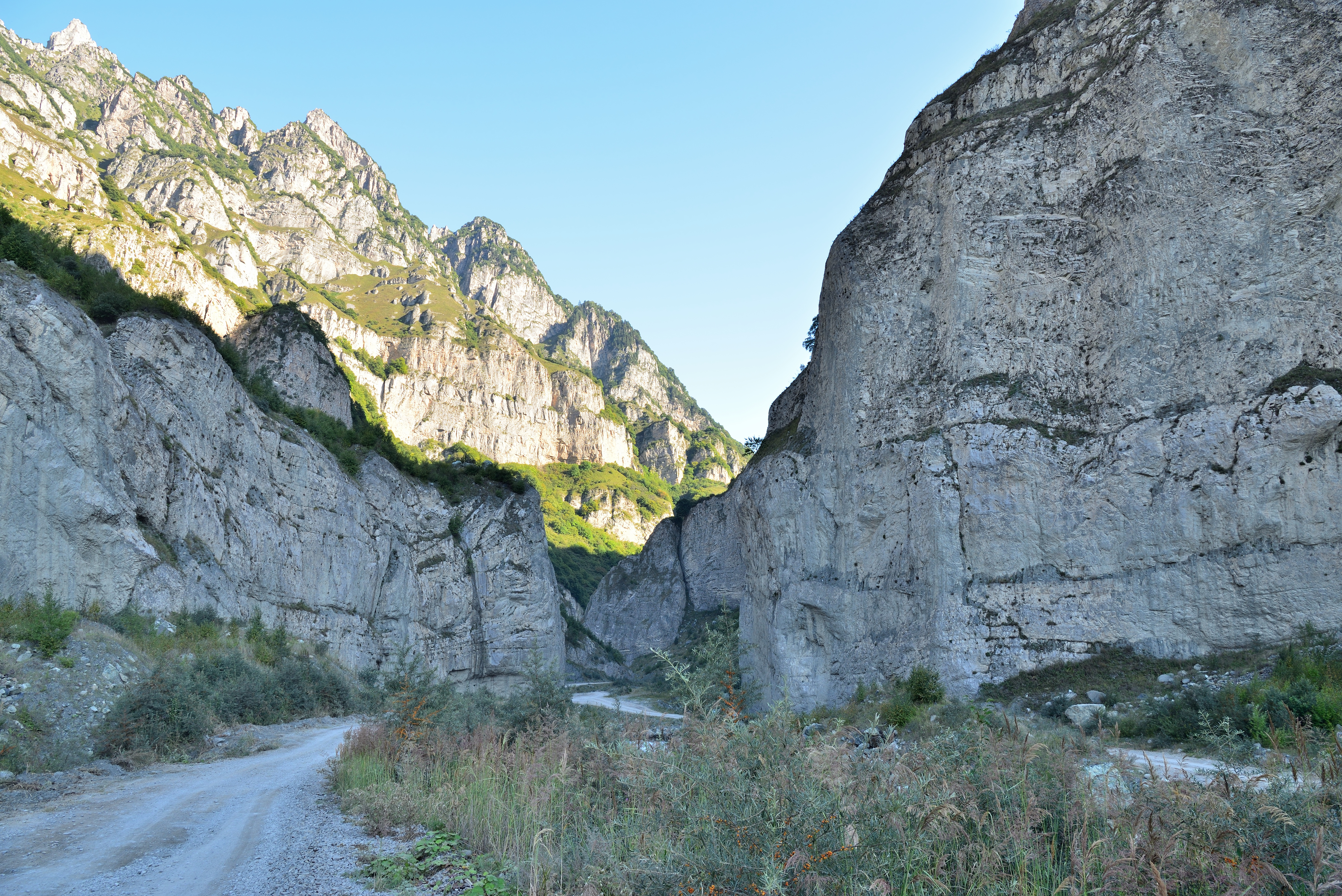
Karmadon. Narrowing of the gorge walls

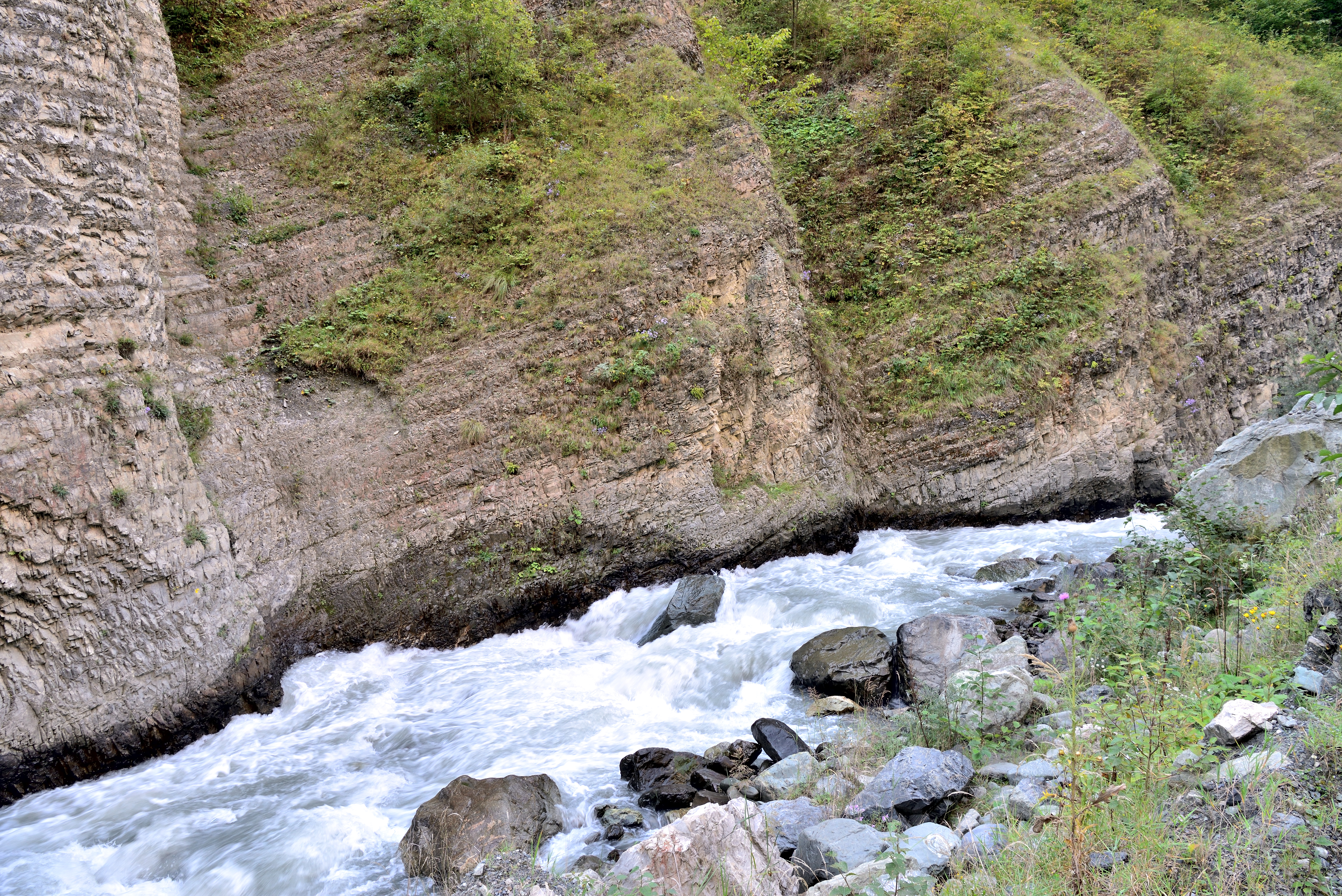
Karmadon. Traces of the glacier's descent on the walls of the gorge

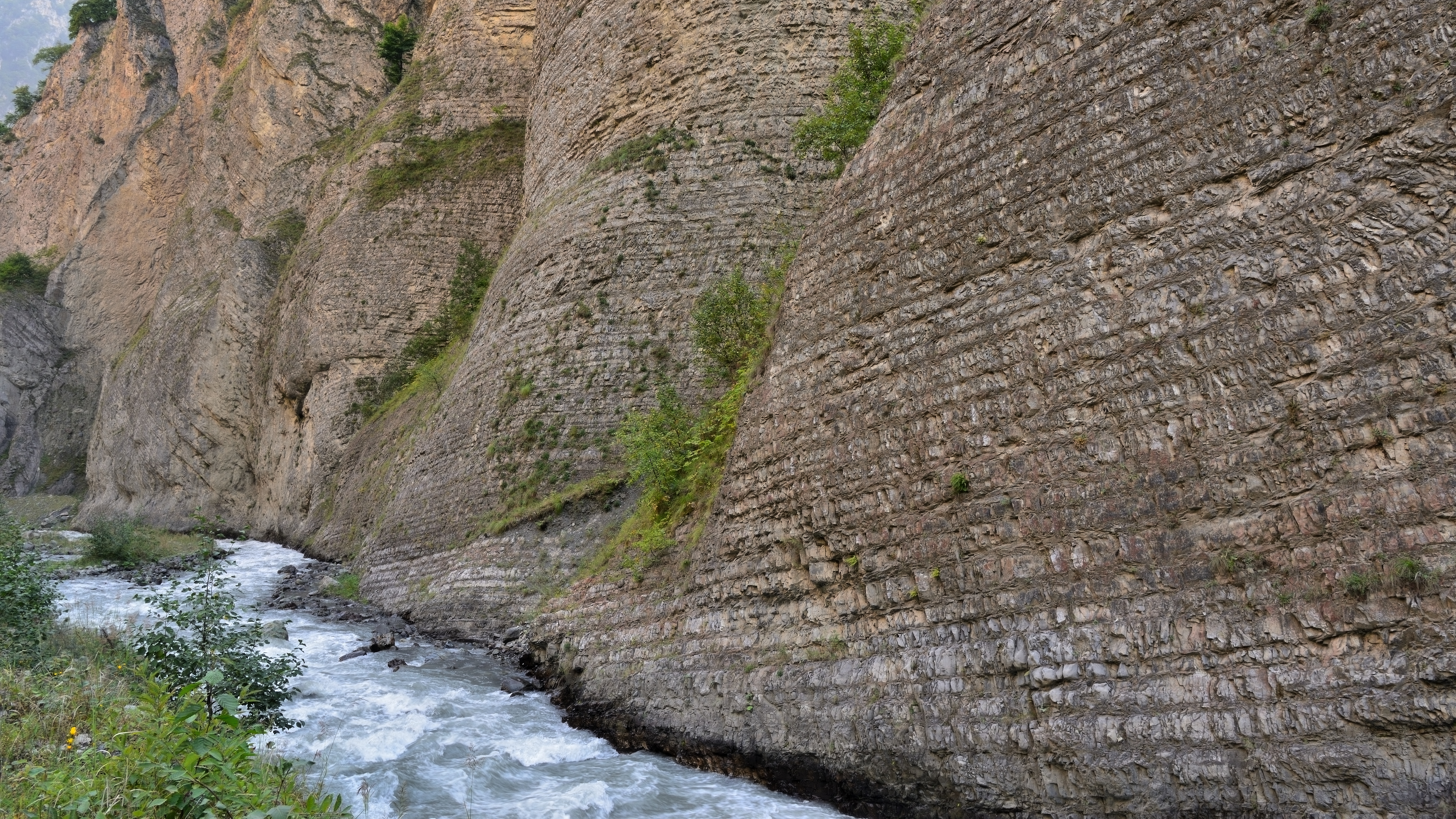
Karmadon. Traces of the collapse of the Kolka glacier on the walls of the gorge

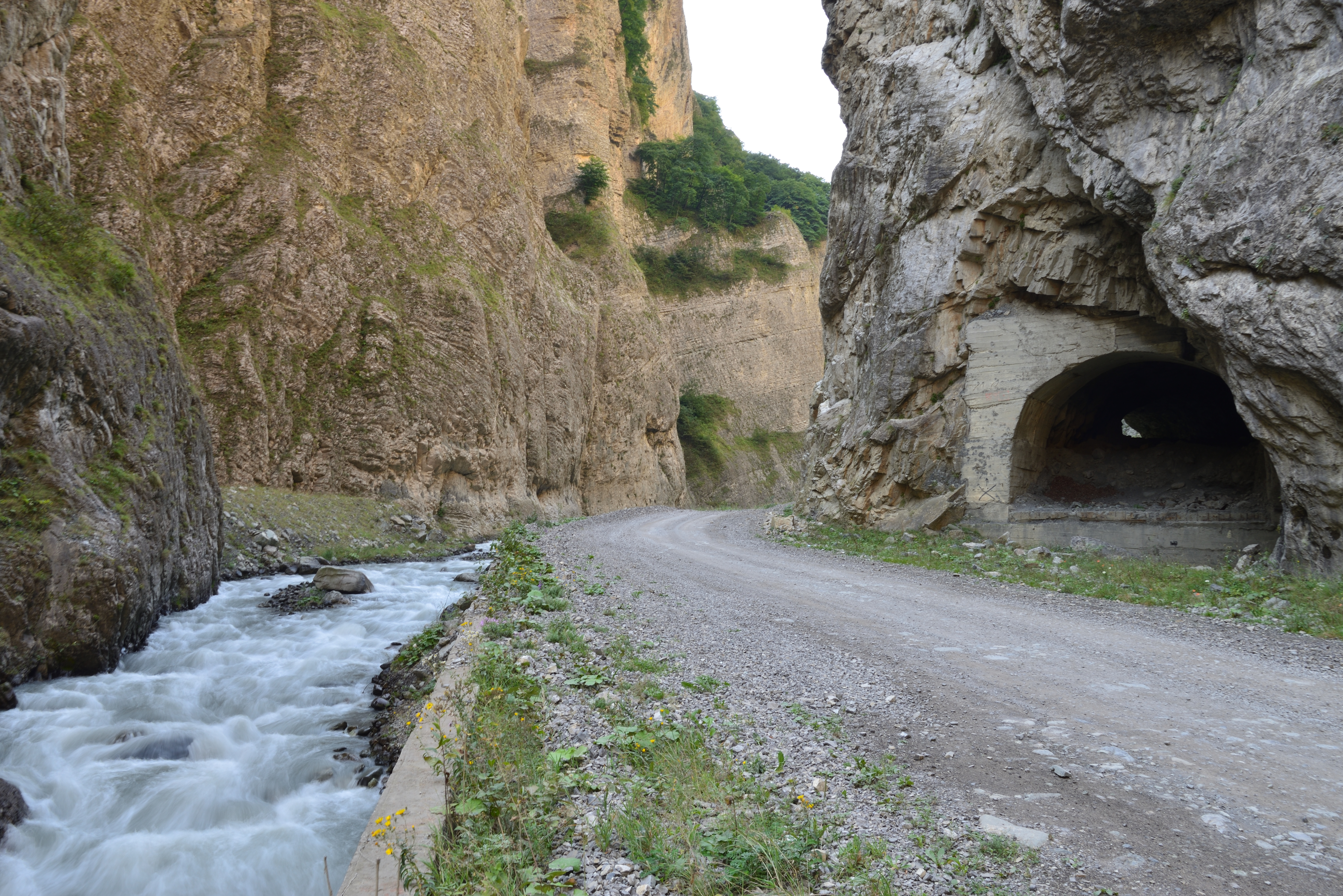
Karmadon. The area of the rehabilitated road in the gorge

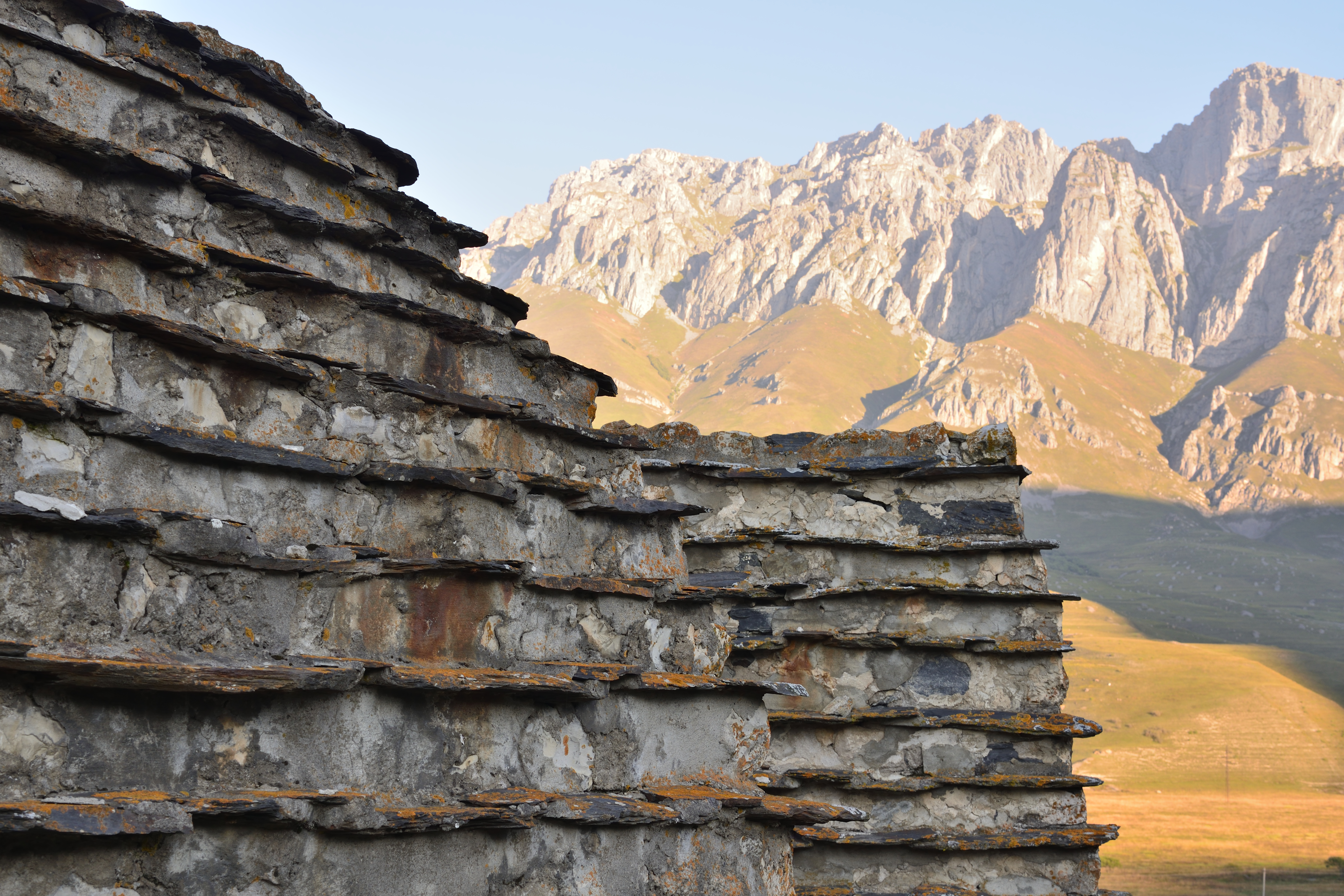
The upper part of the crypt burial Grounds (16-17 centuries) against the mountains

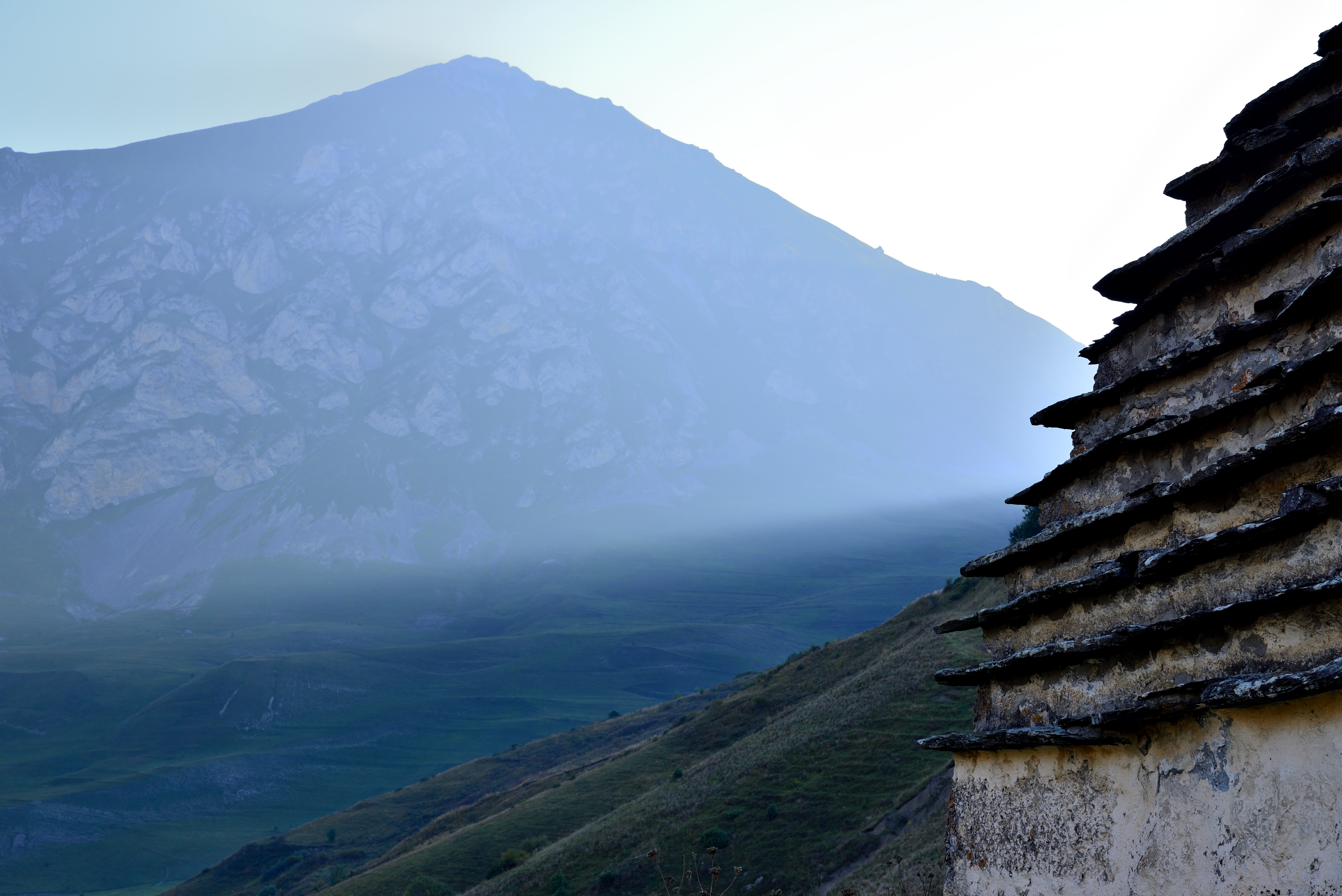
Dargavs. Dawn. Crypt burial ground

== Notable people ==
- Issa Kodzoev (1938-), Ingush politician, writer, poet, playwright

== Bibliography ==
- Союз горцев Кавказа в ЧСР (1924). "Кавказский горец" [Caucasian highlander] (in Russian) (1). Прага: Издание Союза горцев Кавказа в ЧСР: 3–79.
- Мартиросиан, Г. К. (1933). История Ингушии [History of Ingushiya] (in Russian). Орджоникидзе: Сердало.
- Багратиони, Вахушти (1904). География Грузии [Geography of Georgia] (in Russian). Translated by Джананашвили, М. Г. Тифлис: Типография К.П. Козловского. Головинск. просп., № 12. pp. 1–290.
- Зейдлиц, Н.К. (1894). Известия Кавказского отдела Императорского Русского географического общества (in Russian). Vol. 2. Тифлис.
- Мугуев, Хаджи-Мурат (1931). Ингушетия: Очерки (in Russian). Москва: Издательство «Федерация».
- Здравомыслов, А.Г. (1998). Осетино-ингушский конфликт: перспективы выхода из тупиковой ситуации [Ossetian-Ingush conflict: prospects for overcoming the impasse] (in Russian). Москва: РОССПЭН. pp. 1–128.
