= Issa Kodzoev =

Ingush writer and politician

Issa Ayupovich (Note: Sometimes spelled as Ayubovich.) Kodzoev Коазой Аюпа Ӏийса
- Born: 12 August 1938 (age 88); Angusht, Checheno-Ingush ASSR, Russian SFSR, Soviet Union
- Occupations: writer, novelist, poet, playwright, translator
- Writing career
- Language: Ingush, Russian
- Genres: novels, short stories, poems
- Notable work: Гӏалгӏай (lit. the Ingush)
- Website: issa-kodzoev.ru

Issa Ayupovich Kodzoev (Russian: Исса́ Аю́пович Кодзо́ев; Ingush: Коазой Аюпа Ӏийса; born 12 August 1938) is an Ingush writer, poet, playwright, teacher and politician.

== Work ==
=== in Ingush ===
- Дувцараш, 1990
- Хьасани, Хьусени, Анжела яха хоза йиIиги, 2001
- Вешта аьлча, 2003
- КIантий дегаш, 2003
- ГIалгIай — epic novel (2001-2013)
  - Магате-Фаьрате, 2001
  - ГIалгIай Лоаме, 2001
  - Зоазо, 2004
  - Дадеков, 2006
  - Мехка гIонча, 2010
  - Ивизда ГIазд, 2011
  - Аьже Ахк, 2013

=== in Russian ===
- Казахстанский дневник
- Над бездной, 2006
- Обвал, 2009
- Сердца отважных
- Сулумбек Сагопшинский, 2011
- Джамбулат и другие

== Bibliography ==
=== English sources ===
- Shvedov, G. S., ed. (2018-10-10). "Issa Kodzoev speaks about lands lost by Ingush people since 1944". Caucasian Knot.
