= East Prigorodny conflict =

Ethnic conflict between Ingush and Ossetians in North Ossetia

- Part of the post-Soviet conflicts and the Wars in the Caucasus
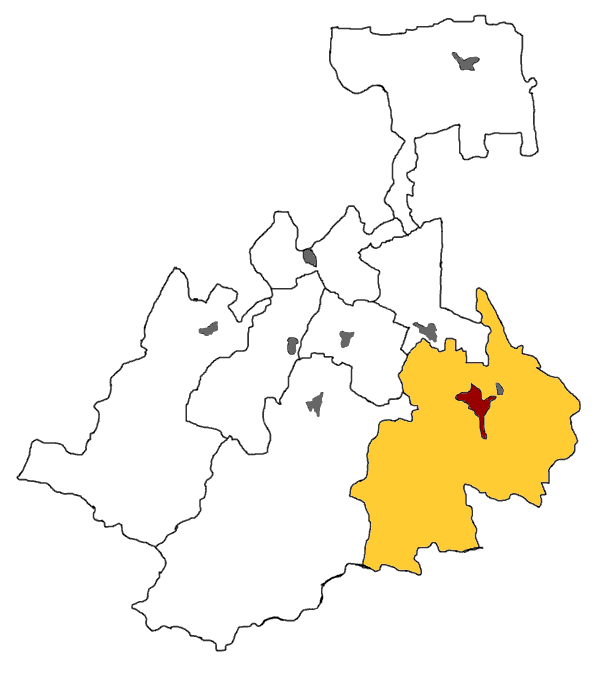
- Prigorodny District in North Ossetia
Date	October 30 – November 6, 1992
Location	Prigorodny District, North Ossetia–Alania, borderland with Ingushetia
Result	Ceasefire (Note: The armed clashes were stopped by the intervention of Russian troops, which supported the status quo.)

Belligerents
North Ossetia; Russian Federation	(Ingushetia) Ingush militia

Commanders and leaders
Boris Yeltsin; Akhsarbek Galazov; Oleg Teziyev; Alan Dzhioev (Parpat)	N/A

Units involved
North Ossetia; North Ossetian Republican Guard; South Ossetian volunteers; Don Cossacks; Terek Cossacks; Russian Army; 9th Motor Rifle Division; 76th Guards Air Assault Division	Ingush armed groups of Prigorodny District; Ingush militia from Ingushetia

Casualties and losses
192 killed 379 wounded	409 killed 457 wounded
- 30,000–60,000 Ingush refugees 9,000 Ossetian refugees

The East Prigorodny conflict, also referred to as the Ossetian–Ingush conflict, (Note: Russian: Осетинско-ингушский конфликт, romanized: Osetinsko-ingushskiy konflikt; Iron Ossetic: Ирон-Мӕхъхъӕлон конфликты, romanized: Iron-Mæqqælon konflikty; Ingush: ХӀирий-ГӀалгӀай конфликт, romanized: Hiriy-Ghalghay konflikt.) was an inter-ethnic conflict within the Russian Federation, in the eastern part of the Prigorodny District in the Republic of North Ossetia–Alania, which started in 1989 and developed, in 1992, into a brief ethnic war between local Ingush and Ossetian paramilitary forces.

== Background ==
Prigorodny District during the period when it was part of Chechen-Ingush ASSR

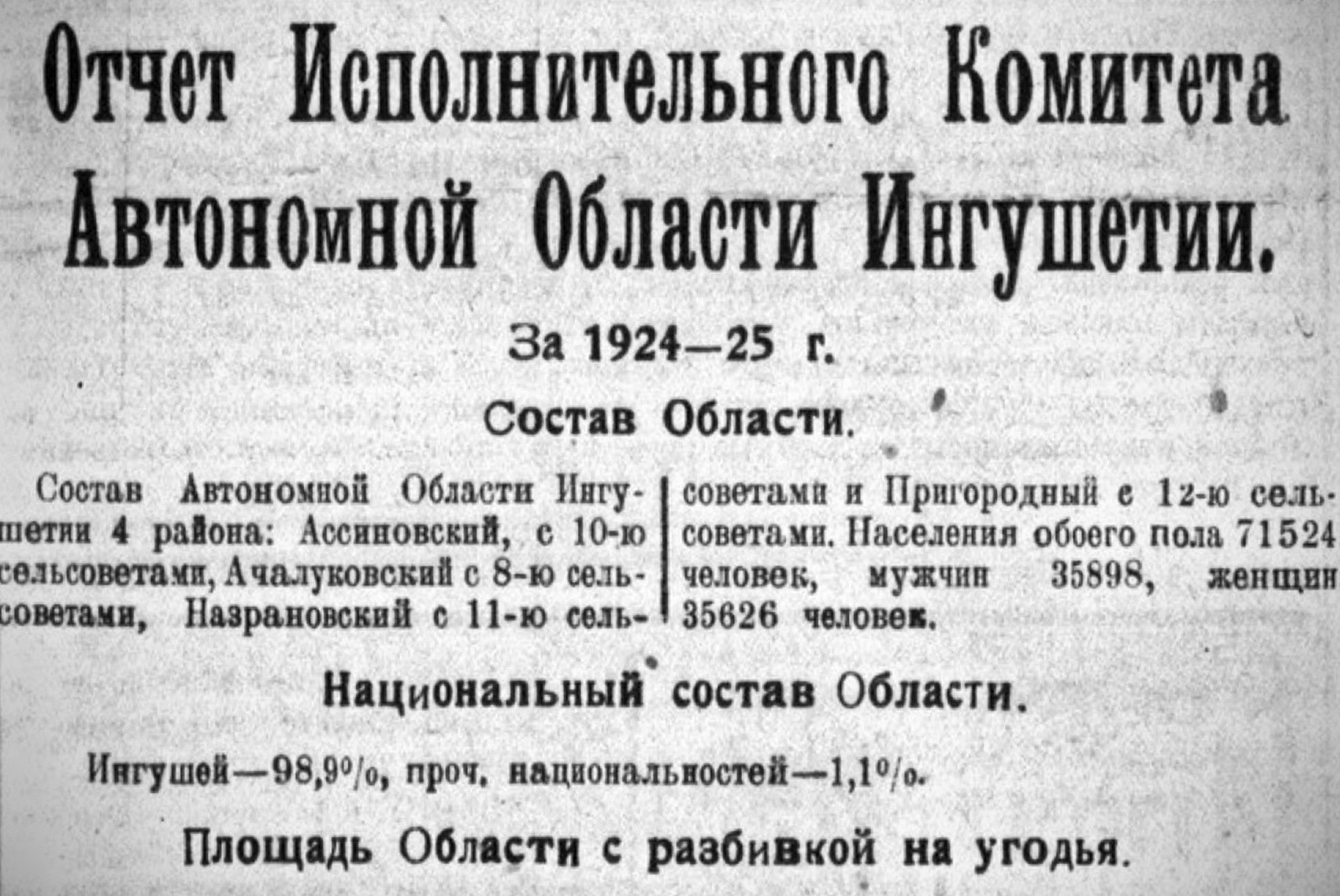
Report of the Executive Committee of the Ingush Autonomous Oblast for the years 1924–1925 showing the Ingush making up no less than 98.,9% of the population of the oblast

=== Ethnic processes of the past ===
After the Mongol invasion of Alania and Timur's invasion of Alania in the 13th and 14th centuries, the Ossetians were forced to leave the plains and flee to the mountain gorges, and their former territories were occupied by the Circassians and other peoples.

The oldest Ingush settlements founded in the Prigorodny district (Tarskaya valley) in the 18th century are Angusht (now the village of Tarskoye), from whose name the ethnonym "Ingush" is derived, and Akhki-Yurt.

With the arrival of Russia in the Caucasus, a number of territories inhabited by the Ingush were transferred to the Terek Cossacks. The lands that had previously belonged to the Ingush were given to the Terek Cossacks and a line of Cossack stanitsas was created, dividing plain and mountainous Ingushetia. The Ingush, however, did not accept this state of affairs. Confrontation with the Cossacks continued constantly, even though the tsarist authorities supported the Cossacks.

After the Russian conquest of the Caucasus, the Nazran okrug was formed for the Ingush people in 1909, the capital of which was to be Nazran. However, there was a lack of suitable administrative buildings in the city. Instead, by decree of the State Council and State Duma of February 1913, Vladikavkaz was appointed as the location of the administration until January 1917.

During the Russian Civil War, many Ossetian villages in the Mozdoksky District, the Prigorodny region, near Vladikavkaz were destroyed by the Bolsheviks and the Ingush, which affected Ossetian-Ingush relations.

After the end of the civil war, the Ingush demanded that the Soviet authorities fulfill their promise to return the lands settled by the Cossacks to the Ingush. In connection with the latter, during the formation of the Gorskaya ASSR, a considerable amount of land was returned to the Ingush, while the Terek Cossacks were evicted. Until 1924 the territory of North Ossetia and Ingushetia was part of the Gorskaya ASSR.

On July 7, 1924 the Gorskaya ASSR was abolished and divided into the North Ossetian and Ingush Autonomous Regions and the Sunzhensky District. The city of Vladikavkaz became an independent administrative unit directly subordinated to the Central Executive Committee of the RSFSR, but was the administrative center of both oblasts.

The first territorial dispute between North Ossetian ASSR and Ingush Autonomous Oblast occurred in 1926. Some villages south of Vladikavkaz were transferred to Ingushetia, and the Ossetian population was evicted.

In October 1928, the leadership of the North Caucasus Krai failed to transfer the city of Vladikavkaz into North Ossetian ASSR because of strong objections from the Ingush Regional Committee of the All-Union Communist Party of Bolsheviks led by Idris Zyazikov. The transfer would have brought the Ingush irreparable losses as the main industrial enterprises, a hospital, technical schools, educational institutions and many cultural institutions of Ingush Autonomous Oblast were located in Vladikavkaz. On 1 July 1933, after the removal of Zyazikov from the political scene and reprisals against other most stubborn opponents and the Ingush Regional Committee being forced to withdraw its previous objections under pressure, the leadership of the North Caucasusian Krai transferred the city of Vladikavkaz (called from 1931 Ordzhonikidze) into North Ossetian ASSR.

Two historical circumstances are of particular relevance to the prehistory of the conflict. One of them is connected with the Bolshevik experiment of territorialization of ethnicity, the creation of internal administrative formations on an ethnic basis. Having been deprived of Vladikavkaz, the Ingush did not find their capital in Grozny either, which gave rise to a powerful complex of disadvantaged people, especially among the intelligentsia and economic elite of Ingush origin. During the period of industrialization no new city emerged on the territory of Ingushetia that could take on the role of a national center, and the subsequent tragic history of the Ingush did not give them such a chance. That is why the issue of transferring part of Vladikavkaz to house the capital administration of the newly formed republic became one of the most important demands of the radical wing of the Ingush national movement. The second important factor in the modern history of the Ingush, which had a huge impact on the mentality and behavior of this group, was the 1944 deportation. By the decree of the Presidium of the Supreme Soviet of the USSR of March 7, 1944, the Chechen-Ingush Republic was liquidated, and all Chechens and Ingush were deported, mainly to Kazakhstan and Kyrgyzstan.

=== 1944 ===
The Prigorodny District was part of the Chechen-Ingush ASSR. Prior to the deportation of the Chechens and Ingush, the population was mostly made up of Ingush (28132 out of 33753). In 1944, with the deportation of the Chechens and Ingush and the abolishment of their ASSR, the district was transferred to North Ossetian ASSR. Soon, on 8 May 1944, the North Ossetian Regional Committee, headed by Kubadi Kulov, replaced the toponymy in the former Chechen and Ingush raions of Chechen-Ingush ASSR. At the same time, the destruction of Chechen and Ingush cemeteries began, the tombstones from which were used for building material, and 25-35 thousand Ossetians from Georgian SSR were resettled to the Prigorodny District.

Between 1944 and 1957, the Prigorodny district was inhabited by Ossetians. The resettlement of Ossetians to the former Ingush lands was also carried out by the authorities against their will and desire. In 1957, when the Ingush were returning from the deportation and their ASSR was restored, they were denied the return to Prigorodny District which remained part of the North Ossetian ASSR. Those who tried to return to their villages faced considerable hostility. Nevertheless, during the Soviet period some Ingush managed to unofficially purchase and occupy their own houses back but they were never recognized as official residents.

The deterioration of relations happened back in 1981. The reason for the deterioration of relations was another murder of an Ossetian taxi driver, 28-year-old resident of Kambileevsky Kazbek Gagloev. He was killed in the Ingush village of Plievo. His funeral actually became an anti-Ingush rally, which caused rallies in Ordzhonikidze in 1981.

During the Soviet period, programs in support of Ingush language and culture in North Ossetian ASSR were totally lacking. The policies of the ASSR limited Ingush residency in the district and hindered their access to plots of land. The internal police and local courts where Ossetians dominated treated the Ingush with prejudice, especially during the state of emergency imposed in Prigorodny in April 1992.

The constant discrimination of the Ingush forced them to organize the Rally in Grozny on 16–19 January 1973 where they demanded that the Soviet authorities solve the problem of the Prigorodny District, provide the Ingush with social equality with the Ossetians. Despite the rally being peaceful, held under the slogans of "friendship of peoples", "restoration of Leninist norms" with the order being maintained by the Ingush themselves, they received no response from the authorities and the rally ended in clashes with the police and the condemnation of its most active participants. According to Idris Bazorkin, after the protest, conditions of Ingush in the Prigorodny District improved somewhat. Ingush language appeared in schools, literature in the Ingush language arrived in the region, broadcasts in the Ingush language began on radio and television, for the first time Ingush deputies appeared in the Ordzhonikidze City Executive Committee and the Prigorodny District Executive Committee. However, much remained the same: authorities continued to limit the registration of Ingush in the district, Ingush children couldn't receive a normal education, discrimination in employment continued and Ingush were negatively portrayed in historical and fiction literature.

On November 19, a car from Grozny was detained in North Ossetia for spying on Ministry of Internal Affairs facilities in North Ossetia. Following this, North Ossetian authorities posted several posts on the border with Chechen-Ingushetia to guard against possible militant infiltration into the republic. The tensions increased in early 1991, during the collapse of the Soviet Union, when the Ingush openly declared their rights to the Prigorodny District according to the Soviet law adopted by the Supreme Soviet of the USSR on 26 April 1991; in particular, the third and the sixth article on "territorial rehabilitation". The law gave the Ingush legal grounds for their demands, which caused serious turbulence in the region. As the tensions grew throughout 1991, Ossetians harassed the Ingush and a slow exodus of refugees began into Ingushetia.

On 20 October 1992, an Ingush girl was crushed by an Ossetian armored personnel carrier and two days later Ossetian traffic police officers shot and killed two Ingush. After the series of murders of Ingush citizens in the district, Ingush deputies requested on 23–24 October the Supreme Soviet of Russia and its government to send a special commission to the Ossetian-Ingush border zone in order to prevent the impending conflict, but no action was taken. On 24 October the leaders of the Prigorodny District gathered in the village of Yuzhny where they called on all local village councils to declare secession from North Ossetia and entry into Ingushetia in accordance with the law of Russia. In addition, an attempt was made to create Ingush self-defense units. At the end of October, things came to an armed confrontation, with the Ossetian side relying on the support of the Russian army.

=== Movement of Ingush for the return of Prigorodny district ===
The ideas of "return of lands" and "restoration of historical justice" have been popular among the Ingush since their return from deportation. For the first time, demands to return the Prigorodny district were voiced on January 16–19, 1973, during open speeches by Ingush intellectuals in Grozny.

In the early 1980s, the ethno-political situation in the region sharply escalated. There were riots among the Ossetian population of a number of villages in the Prigorodny district (Oktyabrskoye, Kambileevskoye, Chermen). At crowded meetings there were demands for forced eviction of Ingush from the North Ossetian ASSR; leaflets with threats against Ingush appeared.

Ensuring the rights and cultural needs of the Ingush in North Ossetia, not only in the Prigorodny district but also at the level of the republican center, was poor. The North Ossetian leadership, including members of the Presidium of the Supreme Soviet, was dominated by the view that no preferences for the Ingush minority in the cultural and linguistic sphere were possible if even the Ossetians themselves did not have them. The Committee on Interethnic Relations under the government also lacked any programs to support the Ingush language and culture in the republic. The Russian language has in fact completely replaced Ossetian and other languages in all the most important spheres of use: from state institutions and the media to education and services. Language Russification in the republic was a much more unpleasant challenge for the Ingush than for the Ossetians.

In 1989, the Nijskho public movement was formed, which advocated the restoration of Ingush autonomy and the transfer of Prigorodny district under its jurisdiction. A September 1989 conference of Ingush intellectuals and nationalists decided to reestablish an Ingush territorial unit within the RSFSR which had existed until 1934 when Ingushetiya was merged with Chechnya. In 1989 and 1990 60,000 signatures were gathered supporting that demand. In March 1990, an article in Pravda perceived by the Ingush as denying their claim to the Prigorodnyi region provoked almost a week of demonstrations that reportedly drew 10,000 people. Consequently, the USSR Supreme Soviet created the "Belyakov Commission" to investigate Ingush demands. The commission concluded that Ingush claims to the Prigorodnyi region were not unfounded.

Moscow approached the problem insufficiently decisively: the federal center practically withdrew itself, did not stop the arming of both sides and could not contain the growing tension. And by legislative acts it only fueled the conflict.

== Armed conflict ==
Ethnic violence rose steadily in the area of the Prigorodny district, to the east of the Terek River, despite the introduction of 1,500 Soviet Internal Troops to the area.

During the summer and early autumn of 1992, there was a steady increase in the militancy of Ingush nationalists. At the same time, there was a steady increase in incidents of organized harassment, kidnapping and rape against Ingush inhabitants of North Ossetia by their Ossetian neighbours, police, security forces and militia.

On October 26, 1992, the Presidium of the Supreme Soviet of Russia proposed that a commission with the participation of Ossetian and Ingush representatives prepare a draft resolution of the contentious Ingush-Ossetian issues. The next day at 12:00 local time, about 150 armed Ingush blocked the internal troops post near the village of Kartsa near Vladikavkaz. On the same day, the Supreme Council of North Ossetia issued an ultimatum to the Ingush demanding that the blockade of several roads leading to Vladikavkaz be lifted by 12:00 on October 29, otherwise the parliament would declare a state of emergency in the republic. Ingush fighters marched to take control over Prigorodny District and on the night of October 30, 1992, open warfare broke out, which lasted for a week. The first people killed were respectively Ossetian and Ingush militsiya staff (as they had basic weapons). While Ingush militias were fighting the Ossetians in the district and on the outskirts of the North Ossetian capital Vladikavkaz, Ingush from elsewhere in North Ossetia were forcibly evicted and expelled from their homes. Russian OMON forces actively participated in the fighting and sometimes led Ossetian fighters into battle.

On October 31, 1992, armed clashes broke out between Ingush militias and North Ossetian security forces and paramilitaries supported by Russian Interior Ministry (MVD) and Army troops in the Prigorodny District of North Ossetia. Although Russian troops often intervened to prevent some acts of violence by Ossetian police and republican guards, the stance of the Russian peacekeeping forces was strongly pro-Ossetian, not only objectively as a result of its deployment, but subjectively as well. The fighting, which lasted six days, had at its root a dispute between ethnic Ingush and Ossetians over the Prigorodnyi region, a sliver of land of about 978 square kilometers over which both sides lay claim. That dispute has not been resolved, nor has the conflict. Both sides have committed human rights violations. Thousands of homes have been wantonly destroyed, most of them Ingush. More than one thousand hostages were taken on both sides, and as of 1996 approximately 260 individuals-mostly Ingush-remain unaccounted for, according to the Procuracy of the Russian Federation. Nearly five hundred individuals were killed in the first six days of conflict. Hostage-taking, shootings, and attacks on life and property continued at least until 1996. President Boris Yeltsin issued a decree that the Prigorodny district was to remain part of North Ossetia on November 2.

== Casualties ==
Total dead as of June 30, 1994: 644.

Killed through November 4, 1992
Ossetian	151
Ingush	302
Other Nationalities	25
North Ossetian Ministry of the Interior	9
Russian Ministry of Defense	8
Russian Ministry of the Interior, Internal Troops	3

Killed between November 5, 1992 and December 31, 1992
Ossetian	9
Ingush	3
Other Nationalities	2
Unknown Nationalities	12
Unified Investigative Group, Ministry of the Interior	1

Killed in 1993
Ossetian	40
Ingush	33
Other nationalities	21
Unknown nationalities	30
North Ossetian Ministry of the Interior	9
Ingush Ministry of the Interior	5
Russian Ministry of Defense	3
Russian Ministry of the Interior, Internal Troops	4
Unified Investigative Group, Russian Ministry of the Interior	8

Killed in 1994 (as of June 30, 1994)
Ossetian	6
Ingush	3
Other nationalities	7
Russian Ministry of Defense	1
Russian Ministry of the Interior, Internal Troops	2
Unified Investigative Group, Russian Ministry of the Interior	4

According to the Russian Prosecutor's Office, 208 Ingush and 37 Ossetians went missing.

Thirteen of the 15 villages in Prigorodny district, where Ingush lived compactly, were destroyed. Up to 90% of the cultural and historical values of the Ingush people were lost.

== Aftermath ==
According to Human Rights Watch:

The fighting was the first armed conflict on Russian territory after the collapse of the Soviet Union. When it ended after the deployment of Russian troops, most of the estimated 34,500–64,000 Ingush residing in the Prigorodnyi region and North Ossetia as a whole had been forcibly displaced by Ossetian forces, often supported by Russian troops. There are no authoritative figures for the number of Ingush forcibly evicted from the Prigorodnyi region and other parts of North Ossetia, because there were no accurate figures for the total pre-1992 Ingush population of Prigorodnyi and North Ossetia. Ingush often lived there illegally and thus were not counted by a census. Thus the Russian Federal Migration Service counts 46,000 forcibly displaced from North Ossetia, while the Territorial Migration Service of Ingushetiya puts the number at 64,000. According to the 1989 census 32,783 Ingush lived in the North Ossetian ASSR; three years later the passport service of the republic put the number at 34,500. According to the migration service of North Ossetia, about 9,000 Ossetians were forced to flee the Prigorodnyi region and seek temporary shelter elsewhere; the majority have returned.

There was no official position or political and legal assessment by the Russian authorities on this issue. The Security Council of the Russian Federation prepared only a draft political assessment of the events of October–November 1992.

In December 1992, with the assistance of the leader of Ingushetia, Ruslan Aushev, all armed Ingush units were disbanded, although weapons remained in the hands of the local population.

As a result of the conflict, the Ingush population of Vladikavkaz and Prigorodny district (with the exception of some residents of Karts, Mayskoye and Ezmi) fled almost entirely from North Ossetia to Ingushetia.

Special correspondents of the Kommersant newspaper who visited North Ossetia wrote about what they saw: The result of the "separation" was the completely extinct and scorched Prigorodny district, from which the entire 30,000-strong Ingush population was deported. Not far from the village of Alkun, on the mountain trails in Ingushetia, we saw the flow of Ingush refugees from North Ossetia, which has not stopped since November 2. People walked for days and nights in the snow and rain. Many are naked, with only small children wrapped in blankets. The Ingush called this path "the path of death", dozens of women and children have already died on it, falling into the gorge, and dozens of civilians have died of hypothermia. There were cases of childbirth and miscarriages in the mountains. Ingush tribesmen on the other side of the border provided assistance to the refugees on bare enthusiasm.

The dead Ingush were buried in a cemetery in Nazran. In 2012, a "memorial to the victims of the fall of 1992" was opened there.

The republican authorities completely took the position of "national interests of Ossetians" and preferred blood solidarity with citizens of another state to protecting the interests and security of the republic's residents, who were an ethnic minority.

The federal authorities failed to provide timely assistance in the form of a constructive pacification program and failed to ensure legal order in the zone of inter-ethnic tension. When the conflict escalated, the Center shared the primitive version of "Ingush aggression", and instead of separating the parties and stopping inter-communal violence, its representatives rashly distributed automatic and other weapons to Ossetian civilians, and even more riskily decided to reach Chechnya with armored vehicles using the might of the Russian army, which had pounded Ingush villages in North Ossetia and part of Ingushetia.

On March 20, 1993, the Kislovodsk Agreement was signed between Akhsarbek Galazov and Ruslan Aushev. The Kislovodsk Agreement stipulated that the return would be allowed to those Ingush who had a valid residence permit in the Prigorodny District as of October 31, 1992 and were not members of the Ingush armed units that took part in the conflict.

By the end of July 1994, many Ingush were refugees. Only half of the Ingush who lived in Prigorodny district had official registration in Prigorodny district; back in the Soviet years they had tried not to register them in the disputed territory so that they would move to the ChIASSR rather than stay in Ossetia. Those who had lived for many years without registration now faced difficulties: they could not obtain land or rebuild their homes.

It is estimated that between 1994 and 2008, around 25,000 of the Ingush people returned to Prigorodny District while some 7,500 remained in Ingushetia.

Since the conflict, the parties have repeatedly signed agreements on overcoming its consequences. The last one was signed after Murat Zyazikov was elected president of Ingushetia in 2002. The document again did not resolve the territorial issue, but only suggested that the two sides expand "social, economic and cultural relations". The signed agreements, however, have not eliminated all existing problems. The Ingush demand the return of refugees to Prigorodny district and the implementation of the federal laws "On the Rehabilitation of Repressed Peoples" and "On the Establishment of the Ingush Republic".

The Russian authorities are not interested in changing the local status quo, fearing further politicization of ethnicity. Ossetian-Ingush contradictions arise again and again.

The Russian authorities are also afraid that the start of revision of internal administrative borders (i.e. the decision to transfer Prigorodny district under the jurisdiction of Ingushetia) may cause a "domino effect" for other constituent entities of the Russian Federation. Chechnya and Ingushetia, Kalmykia and Astrakhan Oblast, and various districts within Dagestan have disputed borders.

A program unveiled in May 2005 for expediting the return of the Ingush displaced persons to their abandoned homes in Prigorodny Raion by the end of 2006 was only partially implemented. Consequently, as of October 2016, just 23,430 Ingush had succeeded in returning, with a similar number still in Ingushetia, according to Magomed Mutsolgov, head of the NGO Mashr. Those who have returned experience problems finding work; Ingush and Ossetian children attend separate schools. Neither has the Russian leadership undertaken any serious effort to promote reconciliation. As a result deep-rooted stereotyped perceptions of "the adversary," often based on a distorted or mythologized perception of past events, continue to poison relations between the two ethnic groups.

== See also ==
- Georgian–Ossetian conflict

== Sources ==
- Deutch, Mark (2007-02-11). "Осетино-ингушский конфликт: у каждой из сторон – своя правда" [Ossetian-Ingush conflict: each side has its own truth]. Nezavisimaya gazeta (in Russian). Moscow.
- Gammer, Moshe (2014-09-22). "Separatism in the Northern Caucasus". Caucasus Survey. 1 (2). Leiden; Paderborn: Brill; Schöningh: 1–10 (37–47). doi:10.1080/23761202-00102003.
- Karpov, Yury (1990). "К проблеме ингушской автономии" [About the problem of Ingush autonomy] (PDF). Sovetskaya etnografia (in Russian) (5). Moscow: Nauka: 29–33.
- Marshall, Alex (2010). The Caucaus Under Soviet Rule. Taylor & Francis. ISBN 978-1-136-93825-2.
- Nekrich, Аlexander (1978). Наказанные народы [The Punished peoples] (in Russian). New York: Khronika Press. pp. 1–170.
- Rezvan, Babak (2010-01-01). Asatrian, Garnik; et al. (eds.). "The Ossetian-Ingush Confrontation: Explaining a Horizontal Conflict". Iran and the Caucasus. 14 (2). Leiden; Boston: Brill: 419–430. doi:10.1163/157338410X12743419190502. eISSN 1573-384X. ISSN 1609-8498.
- Rezvani, Babak (2015-01-27). Conflict and Peace in Central Eurasia. International Comparative Social Studies. Vol. 31. Leiden; Boston: Brill. pp. 1–361. ISBN 978-90-04-27636-9.
- Schnirelmann, Victor (2006). Kalinin, Ilya (ed.). Быть Аланами: Интеллектуалы и политика на Северном Кавказе в XX веке [To be Alans: Intellectuals and Politics in the North Caucasus in the 20th Century] (in Russian). Moscow: Novoe literaturnoe obozrenie. pp. 1–348. ISBN 5-86793-406-3. ISSN 1813-6583.
- Smith, Sebastian (2009). Allah's Mountains: The Battle for Chechnya (3rd ed.). London; New York: Tauris Parke Paperbacks. pp. 1–288.
- Tishkov, Valery (1997). Ethnicity, Nationalism and Conflict in and After the Soviet Union: The Mind Aflame. London: SAGE. pp. 1–334. ISBN 0761951857.
- Tishkov, Valery (2013). "Социально-политическая ситуация в 1940–1990-е годы" [Socio-political situation in the 1940s–1990s]. In Albogachieva, Makka; Martazanov, Arsamak; Solovyeva, Lyubov (eds.). Ингуши [The Ingush] (in Russian). Moscow: Nauka. pp. 87–99.
- Tsutsiev, Arthur (1998). Осетино-ингушский конфликт (1992—...): его предыстория и факторы развития. Историко-социологический очерк [Ossetian-Ingush conflict (1992–...): its background and development factors. Historical and sociological essay] (in Russian). Moscow: ROSSPEN. pp. 1–200. ISBN 5-86004-178-0.
- Tumakov, Denis V. (2022). "Осетино-ингушский вооружённый конфликт 1992 год" [The Ossetian-Ingush armed conflict of 1992 as covered by the Russian central press]. Historia provinciae (in Russian). 6 (2): 439–484. doi:10.23859/2587-8344-2022-6-2-3. eISSN 2587-8344.
- Zdravosmyslov, Andrey (1998). Осетино-Ингушский конфликт: Перспективы выхода из тупиковой ситуации [Ossetian-Ingush conflict: Prospects for breaking the deadlock] (in Russian). Moscow: ROSSPEN. pp. 1–127. ISBN 5-86004-177-2.
