= Warhag =

Ossetian mythological figure

- Region: Ossetia

Genealogy
- Spouse: Sainagon, Dzerassae
- Children: Akhshar and Akhsartag

Warhag or Uærhæg (Ossetian: Уæрхæг, "wolf") is the progenitor of the heroes of the Ossetian Nart saga, the father of the twins Akhsar and Akhsartag.

== In the Nart saga ==
=== Uærhæg and the birth of twins ===
In old age, the Nart Warhag and his wife Sainagon had two sons, and he arranged a feast, inviting the blacksmith Kurdalægon and many others. The heavenly blacksmith gave the two children the names Akhsar ("Valiant") and Akhsartag ("Stronger than his brother").

The sons grew up strong and valiant so that they were considered among the best of their kind, their proud father chose them to guard the garden of Nart, where an apple tree grew, which bore the only miraculous fruit that was stolen every night, despite the guard set by the Narts.

=== The distance from the children and the reunion ===
Warhag exhorted the twins to pay close attention to them, but the two were led away in pursuit of the doves guilty of theft, and their father was left alone and grew old in despair of finding his children.

Akhsar and Akhsartag by a tragic misunderstanding committed suicide and the wife of the latter Dzerassae settled in the village of the Narts, where she gave birth to their two sons Uryzmaeg and Haemyts, who becoming adults went in search of their ancestor after the prophetess told them that he was all still alive. Two grandsons found their grandfather a working shepherd, then they shaved him and found him to be quite young. Together with his grandsons, he met his daughter-in-law Dzerassae, whom he married and with whom he lived until the end of his days.

However, Warhag died a year after the marriage, and Dzerassae died a year later.

== See also ==
- Akhsar and Akhsartag
- Nart saga
- Ossetian mythology
