= Circassian paganism =

Ethnic religion of the Circassian people

Circassian Paganism
- A Zichian wheel, representing the articulation of the universe from the center.
- Classification: Pagan
- Language: Adyghe, Kabardian
- Members: Estimated 4,000 people following the Pagan rituals

Circassian paganism is the ethnic religion of the Circassians. It is based on worshipping the supreme god Thashkho (Тхьэшхо) and other deities under his rule, to each of whom is attributed an element, action or item of veneration and control. The religion also strongly focuses on the perfection of the soul, developing spiritual maturity and honour until a practitioner, in union with their ancestors. The ancient pagan religion of the Circassians should not be mistaken with the secular Khabze code; doing so is considered a "common mistake".

== Concepts and values ==
Before encountering Abrahamic religions, the Circassians believed in their traditional religion. The foundation of this religion is the worship of the chief god, Thashkho (Adyghe: Тхьэшхо, lit. 'Great God'). Some classify this religion as polytheistic or henotheistic, while a minority as monotheistic. Thashkho has attributes such as "needed by all, but needing no one," "creating from nothing, the multiplier," and "allowing the cycle of the universe." All beings are essentially one and part of an eternal cycle; only Thashkho, the creator, is unaffected by this cycle. Prayers to Thashkho were made as "Good God, we wretches pray to you." Thashkho also has lesser deities subordinate to him. The beginning of the world is associated with the formation of the great emptiness or the universe (Adyghe: Хы). Thashkho created the universe and order, and the rest developed spontaneously. The symbol of the Circassian religion is the T symbol.

According to Leonti Lyulye, who traveled through Circassia, in the Circassian belief, souls were rewarded after death according to their deeds on earth. Therefore, the purpose of human earthly existence was the soul's perfection. An important element was the spirit of the ancestors. The spirits of the ancestors required commemoration: funeral feasts were held, and sacrifices or memorial meals were prepared and distributed in memory of the deceased souls.

Before the Middle Ages, there were trade relations between the Circassians and the Greeks. The Circassian forest goddess Mezitha and the Greek forest god Pan are roughly the same person. The name of the Circassian bee goddess Merisse means "bee" in Greek. Other similarities can be found between Greek and Circassian beliefs: Greek mythology contains references to Circassia (such as Prometheus chained to Mount Elbrus). Some have even claimed that this mythology originated in Circassia.

Edmund Spencer described the traditional religion of the Circassians as follows:

The principal articles in the faith of the inhabitants of the Western Caucasus are,—a firm belief in one God, supreme and powerful, and in the immortality of the soul, which they feel convinced will be translated to another world, the abode of their fathers.

Like the Mahometans (Muslims), they do not represent the Deity under any visible form, but define him as the Creator of all things, whose spirit is diffused over all space.

Besides the one Eternal God, they believe in the existence of several inferior beings, or saints, to whom the Great Spirit, Thka, has delegated power over such sublunary things as he deems too trivial for his awful superintendence. These saints have each an anniversary, which is celebrated with public rejoicing and prayer, in the same manner as festivals are in Catholic countries. Some of them are represented under a peculiar symbol; but they do not worship them, except as intermediate agents.

Upon this subject I made strict inquiry, and found that all my informants agreed as to this point, and which confirmed what I had previously heard from several Russian officers, who had been for many years in communication with the Circassians. Nevertheless, this worship must be regarded as a species of adoration by the strict Protestant and the equally rigid Mahometan.

Circassians had a tradition of burying the dead in high places. German traveler Johannes Schiltberger, who passed through Circassian lands in 1427, wrote the following:

They (the Circassians) have a tradition of placing those who died from lightning strikes in coffins and hanging them from a tall tree. After this, neighbors arrive with food and drink. They begin dancing, partying, slaughtering oxen and rams, and distributing most of the meat to the poor. They do this for three days, repeating the process year after year until the bodies have completely decomposed. They consider the person struck by lightning to be a saint.

Turkish traveler Evliya Çelebi wrote:

After performing various rituals, the storytellers gather people at the deceased's bedside. This is a surprising and rare sight. They then place the deceased in a special coffin, perched on the branches of a large tree in the mountains.

Sultan Barquq, the Circassian Mamluk ruler of medieval Egypt, was also buried in accordance with Circassian tradition; the coffin containing his body was hung from the ceiling of the mosque by the Circassian community.

The most important deities were:

- Mezytha (god of the forests) – controlled the fate of wild animals and dictated success in the hunt.
- Zeykutkh (god of horsemanship) – served as the patron deity of riding and equestrians, though he lacked a clearly defined physical form.
- Psykhe-Guasha (princess of the waters) – a maiden deity who ruled over and protected bodies of water.
- Ahin (patron of cattle) – ranked among the most vital deities; a prominent myth details the sacred, "self-walking" sacrificial cow of Akhina.
- Sozeresh (patron of agriculture and fertility) – manifested physically as a domestic idol kept in family barns, fashioned from a seven-knotted branch of hamshkhut wood.
- Emish (patron of sheep breeding) – explicitly venerated during autumn ritual cycles coinciding with the mating season of rams.

Concurrently, the Circassians recognized and revered a supreme creator deity of the universe: the great Thashkho. Their theological practices strictly eschewed human sacrifice or the consumption of sacrificial blood. Beyond the central pantheon, Circassians venerated semi-divine figures and the Narts—the mythic heroes around whom the folklore created the heroic world of the Nart epic. Among these, the most widely celebrated was Sosruqo. On a specific winter night, families hosted lavish feasts in his honor, setting out the finest delicacies in the guest room for the hero, alongside fresh oats and hay in the stable for his magical steed. Any random traveler who happened upon the home that night was welcomed and feasted in Sosruqo's stead.

Another prominent figure, Tlepsh, was highly revered by blacksmiths as the master of fire, metalworking, and weapons; the community also petitioned him during ritual vigils to heal wounds and alleviate illness. As Islam began to penetrate the region, the imagery surrounding many of these traditional saints and epic heroes was gradually adapted by polytheistic Circassians into the mythos of heroic Arab warriors and Islamic legends.

=== Holy places (groves and trees) ===
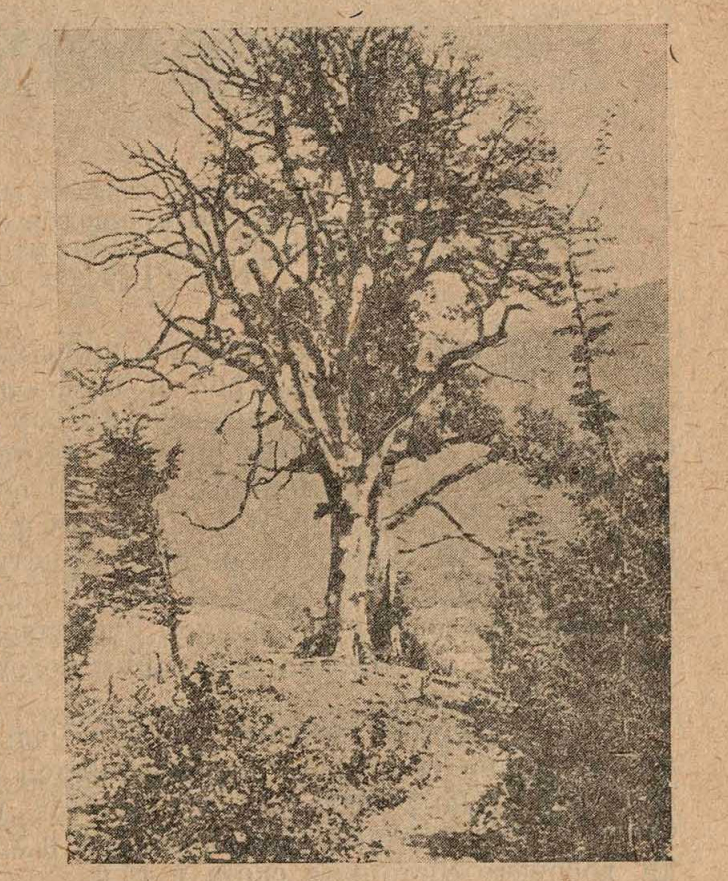
Two sacred oak trees in Tuapse. The pagan Shapsugs used to pray in front of these trees. The one in front was withered by the Russian authorities.

Numerous accounts from Western writers beginning in the 17th century firmly document the Circassians' deep veneration of sacred groves. Among them, the Dominican missionary Giovanni Luca (1637) described these sacred spaces, locally known as kudoshi, where weapons and the heads of sacrificed rams were hung prominently from branches. Later, the diplomat Claude-Charles de Peyssonnel (1787) documented a sacred tree named panjassan located "in the center of Circassia," noting that the local population held a reverence for it that bordered on idolatry. The consul and traveler Taitbout de Marigny corroborated this widespread veneration of groves, observing that during internal community feuds, a dissatisfied faction could choose to secede and establish an independent sacred grove of their own. Conversely, during inter-communal warfare, attackers occasionally desecrated their opponents' shrines despite sharing identical spiritual beliefs. Similarly, the English diplomat James Stanislaus Bell (1840) encountered revered trees and groves throughout the Pshada and Dzhubga river valleys; visitors regularly adorned these branches with fabric rags, both as religious offerings and as symbolic rituals to transfer and bind the illnesses of those seeking healing to the trees.

A highly detailed record is preserved in the 1724 text, Description of Circassia, compiled by Xaverio Glavani, French consul in the Crimea and first physician to the Khan, in Bakhchisarai, January 20, 1724:

"Each district of Circassia has a special sacred place, usually located in the forest, where the object of worship is a large tree. The Circassians call such a tree "penekassan." They perform their prayers before it. The dying leave a sabre, a gun, and clothing to the penekassan. These objects are ceremoniously carried there and hung on the trees, so that over time the forest becomes filled with all manner of weapons, clothing, and other items. But no one dares touch them. The dead are buried in this forest, and rituals are performed. If men and women who have committed a crime hide in the "penekassan" forest and tie a piece of cloth from among those hanging on the trees around their necks, they are exempt from punishment, as they are under the protection of a deity. It has been known for Turks enslaved by the Circassians to gain their freedom by placing themselves under the protection of the "penekassan." It should be noted, however, that slaves and criminals enjoy a certain freedom and immunity only as long as the piece of cloth they tied around their necks remains. The slaves, without waiting for the bandage to completely fall apart from wear and tear, having gained their freedom, hasten to leave the region."

These foreign accounts align precisely with observations made by Russian ethnographers from the 1860s onward. For instance, the Natukhai tribe, one of the primary Circassian subdivisions that were deported to the Ottoman Empire following the conclusion of the Russo-Circassian War in 1864, held the ancient groves of the Baku Gorge (a tributary of the Adagum River) in exceptionally high esteem. Tribal customary law strictly forbade the removal of a single branch, leaf, or any weapon or item suspended from the canopy.

In the Pshada River valley, the Natukhais similarly venerated a massive tree that had once been struck by lightning. This site was widely believed to possess miraculous powers to cure fevers. Afflicted individuals traveled to the tree with ritual offerings—primarily traditional pies—which were immediately consumed by the companions accompanying the sick. Before departing, a small splinter or piece of bark from the tree was sewn into a cloth pouch and placed permanently around the patient's neck as an amulet, while the remaining fabric was tied to the branches as a reciprocal offering, leaving the entire tree festooned with cloth.

The archives of the Krasnodar Regional Museum include historical collections of bark and wood fragments gathered from lightning-struck trees. These remnants were traditionally utilized in rainmaking rituals during severe droughts and for medicinal purposes. Patients wore them on their backs to alleviate illness and, upon recovery, returned to hang symbolic scraps of fabric on the specific lightning-scarred tree. Far from being a distant antiquity, this practice persisted among the lowland Circassian communities well into the late 19th century.

In the Adyheko tract along the Ilbzhi River (a right tributary of the Afips, located within the territory of the Greater Shapsugs), the local population maintained a tkha-chig (god's tree), a sacred grove composed of centuries-old lindens and plane trees known as tkhamakha ("dedicated to God"). This historical sanctuary was systematically destroyed by Imperial Russian troops in 1863 during the construction of a military redoubt. In earlier eras, the Shapsugs gathered here to offer sacrifices, recite communal prayers, and hang weapons on the ancient trees, all of which were deemed strictly inviolable. Shapsug tradition warned that sacrilegious individuals and their kin would face divine retribution, catastrophic misfortune, or even total tribal annihilation if the grove were desecrated. These assemblies sought the deity's favor in military campaigns, expressed gratitude for victories, and petitioned for the recovery of the sick.

According to the historian Semyon Dubrovin, the Circassians conducted these rites through animal sacrifices and libations without utilizing formal churches, specialized prayer houses, or constructed altars. Instead, these untouched sacred groves served as natural temples. The local population maintained an absolute belief in the miraculous and protective properties of these woodlands. The Dzhemplokh forest, situated between the Belaya and Pshekha rivers—a region inhabited by the Abadzekhs and Mamkheghs—was dedicated exclusively to the deity of abundance, where a white heifer was sacrificed annually. In 1841, when Russian General Grigory Zass launched a military raid into this territory, his forces engaged in a heated battle within the Dzhemplokh forest, during which Zass was wounded. The Circassians widely interpreted this injury as a direct divine punishment against the general for daring to violate their sacred grove.

Dubrovin also detailed the precise structural layout and ritual procedure of these prayer sites. A rustic altar, marked by a roughly fashioned wooden cross, was typically erected beneath the canopy of a prominent oak tree. Specific family lineages congered at these sites to invoke the supreme deity, Thashkho. Each valley contained multiple sacred groves, with a designated cluster of families assigned to each, effectively forming a localized grove parish, or tgakhap. A respected elder was elected to serve as a lifelong priest (shkhuako). During religious festivals, the priest secured the cross against the trunk, surrounded and illuminated it with candles, and performed ritual purifications. Donning a traditional burka and removing his hat, he knelt to recite specific prayers tailored to the occasion—usually petitioning for a bountiful harvest, timely rain, or deliverance from epidemics. Following the invocation, the priest took a candle from the cross, rubbed wax onto the forehead of the sacrificial animal (a goat, ram, or bull), poured a libation of buza (a traditional fermented grain beverage) over its head, and performed the slaughter. The priest then raised a cup of buza and a ritual flatbread toward the heavens in prayer before presenting them to the eldest assembly member, who passed them through the crowd. The congregation then encircled the sacred tree three times. The animal's head was mounted on a ritual pole, the hide was gifted to the priest, and the meat was prepared for a communal feast. While the food cooked, elders joined hands to perform traditional ritual dances to ancient melodies, later joined by the youth. Once prepared, the senior men dined together while the younger men served them, and the women and girls feasted collectively at a respectful distance.

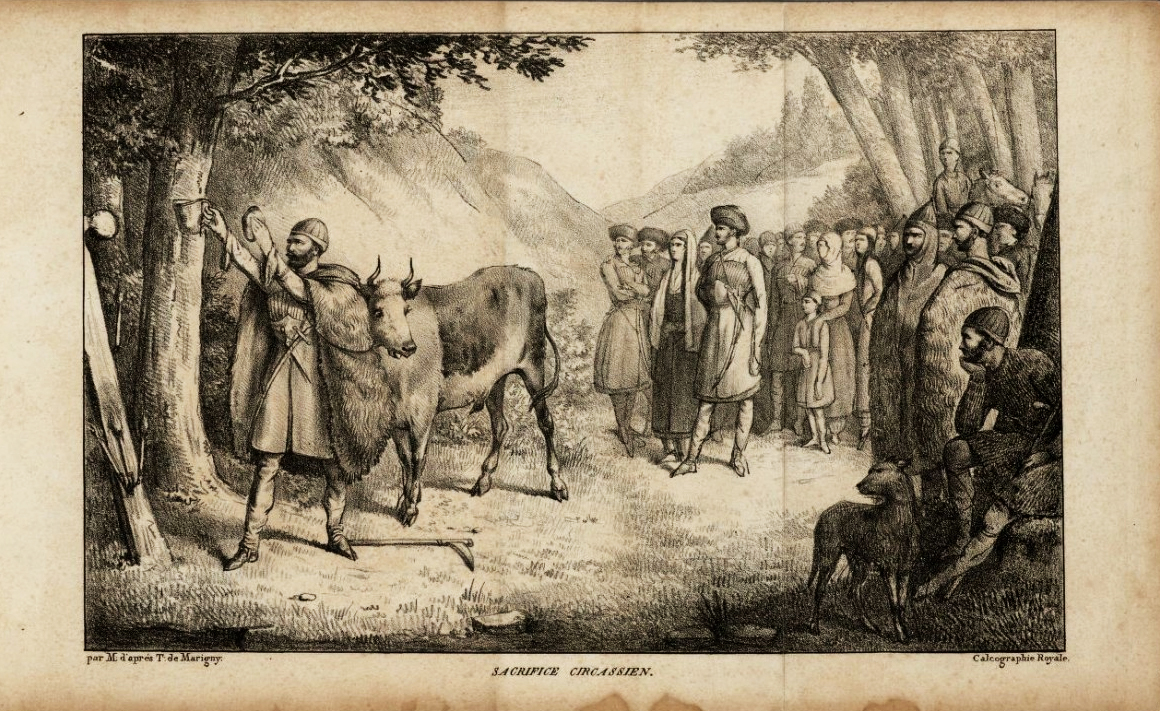
Circassian sacrifice. Engraving based on a drawing by Edouard Taitbout de Marigny

The Abadzekh community preserved distinct memories of these pre-Islamic practices centered around their traditional patron deity, Akhyn. Sacrifices were performed at revered oak trees, where a sacred cow was slaughtered following an invocation by the elders, after which the meat was distributed among the community. In 1902, an ethnographer recorded a local account of an elderly man who informed his adult sons, "You may practice your religion (Islam), but I will pray according to the customs of our ancestors." The elder then retreated into the forest to an isolated oak tree, surrounded by accumulated white sacrificial bones, where he engaged in prolonged prayer.

Vestiges of tree and grove veneration have survived among the Circassians into modern times. In the summer of 1929, Professor B. Sokolov documented active traditions within the Shapsug coastal villages near Krasno-Aleksandrovsky (Legotkh). His research confirmed that despite a general institutional decline, these ancient rituals remained localized. The village maintained sacred oaks known as thakhoch ("under God"). During a contemporary anti-religious campaign, local Komsomol activists severed the root system of one prominent sacred oak, causing the ancient tree to wither.

=== Lightning worship (Shible) ===
The cult of Shible, the Circassian deity associated with lightning and thunder, survived among several Circassian groups well into the modern period. Sacred trees struck by lightning were regarded as holy places and often became sites of veneration, sacrifice, and prayer. In many cases, a revered grove originated from a tree that had been struck by lightning.

Individuals killed by lightning were considered blessed or specially chosen. Elaborate rituals were performed in their honor, while livestock killed by lightning were commemorated through ceremonies comparable to those recorded among the Abkhazians.

The ethnographer L. Lulier, who witnessed such a ceremony among the Western Circassians in 1862, described a ritual conducted over three goats struck by lightning:

"A circle formed around the goats, and the usual dance began, accompanied by a chant in which the words 'Shible and Yaliy (Ilya)' were frequently repeated. Meanwhile, several men went into the forest, cut poles and stakes, and constructed a fairly high platform on four posts. They laid the goats on it and covered them with leaves. The platform is made high to protect the goats' carcasses from predatory animals. While some were constructing the platform, others had managed to go to the village and bring back various provisions, including several live goats. These were immediately sacrificed, with a libation ceremony, and their heads were placed on tall poles driven into the ground near the platform. This entire procedure is called shiblasha. No one touches the platform, the stakes, or the goats, and everything is left until it completely collapses and decomposes. While the food was being prepared and the pasta (a thick millet porridge) that serves as a substitute for bread was boiling, the young people of both sexes danced enthusiastically; gaiety and spirit were universal. When everything was ready, we were fed and only then sent on our way."

Celebrations connected with animals killed by lightning lasted three days, while ceremonies for people struck by lightning continued for seven days.

Important evidence for the persistence of the cult was recorded among the Shapsugs of the Black Sea coast in 1929 by Professor B. Sokolov. During periods of drought, members of the community would visit the grave of a person who had been killed by lightning. Trees growing around such graves were regarded as sacred. Participants joined hands and danced barefoot around the grave while chanting "o ele". The ceremony was repeated several times until the participants began to sweat. A relative of the deceased then raised a loaf of bread and appealed to the dead person to intercede on behalf of the community and bring rain.

Afterwards, a stone was taken from the grave and carried to a river. The stone was tied to a tree and submerged in the water. Participants then entered the river fully clothed. According to local belief, these actions would bring rain. The stone was carefully secured to prevent it from being carried away by the current, as excessive rainfall could lead to flooding. A guard remained at the site, and after three days the stone was removed and returned to the grave in a ceremonial procession. This ritual combined elements of ancestor veneration, sacred-tree worship, and the cult of Shible.

Although the lightning cult largely disappeared among the Kabardians, memories of it survived in oral tradition. Elderly informants recalled that special songs were sung during thunderstorms, including the phrase "Ele-ele, eleri shopa", whose meaning had already been forgotten. One Kabardian folktale recounts how the hero Khimysh leapt from a table with such force that people outside believed lightning had struck the house and began chanting ritual invocations associated with the lightning deity.

Among the so-called Mozdok Circassians, descendants of Kabardians who settled near Mozdok during the reign of Catherine the Great, traces of the cult also survived. When lightning struck a particular place, milk or milk soup with noodles was poured onto the site, flatbreads were prepared, food was distributed among those present, money was given away, and ritual dances accompanied by songs such as "Elely Shopa" were performed. In some instances, milk was also poured into wells as part of the ceremony.

=== Rainmaking ===
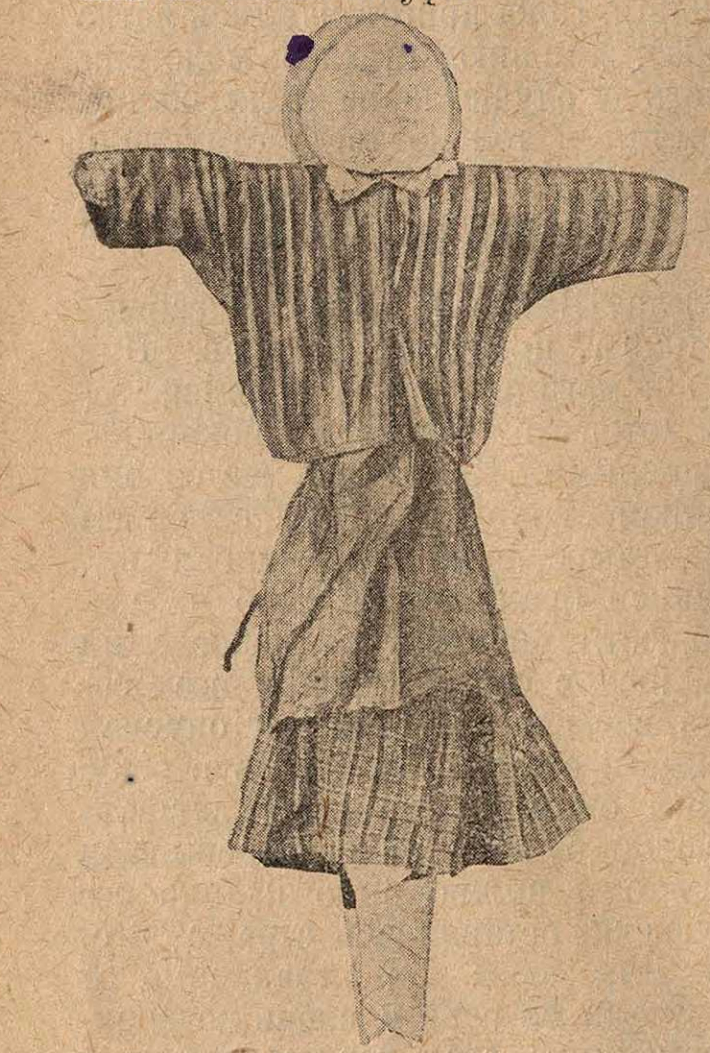
Khatseguashe” — “a doll made from a shovel; used by the Shapsugs in a rain-calling ritual during drought

Several traditional rainmaking rituals were recorded among the Circassians. In addition to the ceremony involving a stone taken from the grave of a person struck by lightning, the Black Sea Shapsugs practiced rituals involving the bathing of a Hatsəguashə and the dragging of an animal skin along the ground to invoke rain during severe droughts.

The Hatsəguashə was a ritual doll made from a wooden shovel dressed in women's clothing. During periods of drought, women and girls carried the doll to a river and threw it into the water. Along the route, people from each household attempted to splash both the doll and its bearers with water. Participants often entered homes, seized those they encountered, and dragged them to the river before throwing them into the water. After the ritual concluded, the doll was stripped of its clothing, dismantled, and discarded. Similar practices were formerly recorded among the Kabardians.

Despite opposition from local mullahs, who condemned the custom as contrary to Islam, the ritual continued to be performed into the twentieth century. In August 1929, women of the Shapsug village of Krasno-Aleksandrovsky revived the ceremony in an attempt to end a drought.

Another rainmaking ritual involved dragging an animal skin across the ground. Unlike the Hatsəguashə ceremony, this practice enjoyed the support of local Islamic clergy. A mullah typically led the procession, followed by two men dragging the skin. Every hundred paces the procession halted while prayers were recited. Similar customs were also recorded among the Kabardians of Greater Kabarda.

=== Worship of iron (Tlepsh) ===
Tlepsh was the patron deity of blacksmiths and the divine guardian of iron, weapons, and metalworking. His cult closely resembled that of Shasha among the Abkhazians.

According to tradition, Tlepsh himself was a master blacksmith capable of forging swords strong enough to cut iron. His grave, reportedly covered with iron filings, was shown in the Guchishche-Govashkh forest. Oaths were sworn in his name, and on feast days worshippers offered prayers and libations over axes, ploughshares, and other iron tools. Ritual observances were followed by communal feasting and marksmanship competitions.

Tlepsh was particularly invoked as a healer of wounds and broken bones. According to descriptions recorded by N. Dubrovin, an injured person was placed in a specially prepared room where iron objects such as ploughshares and hammers were positioned beside the bed. Visitors entering the room were expected to strike the iron three times with a hammer and lightly sprinkle the patient with water while wishing for recovery. Those who had committed crimes often avoided participating in these rituals.

The treatment of the wounded was accompanied by large nightly gatherings attended by relatives, neighbours, and visitors from surrounding villages. The primary objective was to keep the patient awake. Various games, dances, and entertainments were organised, including the popular "hand-slapping" game. The gatherings also served an important social function, strengthening communal bonds and demonstrating collective support for the injured person.

Ethnographic accounts from the Adyghe Autonomous Region recorded similar practices during the twentieth century. During the summer months, the patient's bed was moved into the courtyard, where men and women gathered in separate groups according to traditional etiquette. Violations of social rules were punished through mock trials and humorous penalties. Musical performances, circle dances, and competitive games formed an important part of the proceedings.

Professor B. Sokolov documented comparable gatherings among the Shapsugs, where participants sometimes wore comic masks fashioned from sheepskin and pumpkins. Several examples of these masks were later deposited in ethnographic museum collections.

Among the Kabardians, visitors attending such gatherings were known as shapshako ("those who come to visit"). An iron implement called a vabze was placed at the threshold of the patient's room and remained there until recovery. The festivities included dances, games, storytelling, humorous performances, and masked disguises. Young men frequently competed in displays of wit, jokes, and playful social interaction.

Kabardians also preserved the custom of marking with an iron object the place where an accident had occurred, such as a fall from a horse or a serious injury. In some regions, visitors entering a chapsh gathering would greet the patient by saying: "You are Tlepsh's guest." These practices illustrate the enduring symbolic association between iron, healing, protection, and the divine patronage of Tlepsh.

=== Other ===
It is quite probable that at one time the Circassians had a separate priestly caste that officiated religious services and rites. However, there are no indications that arcane sects nor a power wielding priestly class jealously guarding hidden mysteries inaccessible to the common folk, as was the case in various ancient societies, ever existed; the oldest partaker, who passed on the knowledge to his lay disciples, usually performs religious rites.

It is believed that performance of special rites of worship, in which supplicants encircle a venerated object (like a holy tree, or a spot stricken by lightning) invoke the resident spirits and unlock their latent powers. Some accounts tell of solemn processions round a tree with the supplicants carrying torches; these rituals formed a significant part of a complex system of prayers. The most sacred class of dances was called wij (x'wrey), which is performed by dancers, forming a circle round a venerated object.

Religious rites are sometimes accompanied by chanting. Songs were intoned during feasts in honour of thunder, during sacrifices, and amongst other traditional festivals. When lightning struck a place or an object, a special kind of wij was performed round the stricken spot accompanied by the Song of Lightning (Schible Wered).

Another class of rites of supplication is concerned with prevention of disease; a primitive form of inoculation existed amongst the ancient Circassians in prevention of smallpox, and such an inoculation would be followed by placement in a swing, rocked to the accompaniment of a special chant, Your Lordship (Ziywis-hen), which invoked the mercy of the deity of the disease.

Alongside religious rites may be provided oaths and vows, wherein violation would lead to contempt and shame, and traditionally often retribution by the community.

Some argued that the Circassian pagan faith is monistic, with utmost prominence given to the supreme Thashkho (colloquially shortened to Tha), who begets the universe. Thashkho expresses himself generating the Logos or cosmic Law (khy), the primordial pattern from which all the beings form naturally, developing by internal laws. Enlightenment for men corresponds to an understanding of Tha's Law.

Theshkhue is omnipresent in his creation (coagulation); according to Adyghe cosmological texts, "his spirit is scattered throughout space". In Adyghe hymns, Theshkhue is referred to as "the One everyone asks, but who doesn't ask back", "the multiplier of the non-existent", "on whom everyone places their hope, but who doesn't place hope on anyone", "from whom the gifts come", "His amazing work", "the One who permits heaven and earth to move".

Everything is one (Псори Зыщ/Хыщ, Psori Zysch/Hysch), and is one with Theshkhue. The material-manifested world is in perpetual change, but at the same time there is a foundation that always remains unshaken. That is the originating principle of the world and its Laws. The always-changing world and its basis is compared to a rotating wheel (дунейр шэрхъщи / мэкӀэрахъуэ, duneir sherxschi / mek'eraxue): although the wheel is constantly rotating (changing), the central hub, about which it rotates, remains still. Followers of this worldview, sometimes also Islamised, are found in modern day Turkey.

=== Secondary deities ===
After Theshkue, the supreme god, there are secondary deities, such as:

- Hantseguash: The Goddess of Water and Rain
- Hedrixe: the God and Protector of the Dead
- Heneguash: The Goddess of Sea
- Hyateguash: the Goddess of Beauty and Gardens
- Kodes: The God of Mountains
- Mezguash: The Goddess of all Fauna
- Mezytha: The God of Forests, Hunt and Beasts
- Psetha: The God of Life and Souls
- Sataney: The Goddess of Femininity and Fertility, Mother of the Narts
- Schyble: The God of Lightning
- Sozresh: The God of Fertility, Family, Wellbeing and Illness
- Thageledj: The God of Flora and Crops
- Tlepsh: The God of Fire, Blacksmiths, Steel and Weapons
- Theshu: The God and Protector of Horsemen
- Theqwafeshu: The Herald of Theshxwe
- Tetertup: The God of War and Bloodshed
- Uashkhue: The God of the Skies
- Merise: The Goddess and Protectress of Bees
- The Narts, demigods mentioned in the eponymous Saga with their mother Sataney.

Various other deities are believed to exist as well, with extensive regional and universal pantheons.

The gods and goddesses are divided into two fundamentally different groups:

1. Gods without image, cosmogonic (Thashkhue, Uashkhue, Psetha, Schyble).
2. Anthropomorphic (humanoid) gods (Mezytha, Tlepsh, Thagaledj, etc.).

=== Syncretism with Christianity ===
Historical records indicate that Christianity systematically took root throughout Circassia between the 3rd and 5th centuries AD primarily through Byzantine political and cultural influence. Christianity never truly took root among the Circassian people. It merged with local pagan beliefs, transforming into a semi-pagan, semi-Christian faith. The Virgin Mary was considered both the Mother of God and the Goddess of Bees, while Jesus was identified with Thashkho, the Circassian chief deity. The most significant change Christianity brought to the Circassian belief system was the physical representation of God through icons (Adyghe: Тхьэнапэ). These icons included the Mother of God (Adyghe: Тхьэнанэ) and the Holy Spirit (Adyghe: Тхьэм ипсэ). The Circassians called Christianity "Chelehstan" (Чэлэхьстэн) or "Chiristan" (Чыристэн[ыгъэ]) Christmas "Khurome" (Хъуромэ), Easter "Utizh" (ӏутӏыжь), priests "Shodjen" (Adyghe: Шэуджэн, Kabardian: Щоджэн) and pastors "Shekhnik." Religious ceremonies and prayers were conducted in Greek. Furthermore, Elijah was held in high esteem, called "Yele" (Елэ), and associated with the lightning god Shible.

=== Replacement by Islam ===
The only Abrahamic religion that remained enduring among the Circassians was Islam. By the 16th century, Muslims were a minority in Circassia; most of the population still practiced Christianity or traditional pagan beliefs. Islam entered Circassian culture not directly, but through stories and folk tales. In the 17th century, Christianity had largely lost its influence among the Circassians, and Islam was spreading superficially and slowly, intertwined with paganism. Evliya Çelebi, who visited Circassia in 1666, wrote that mosques existed in the villages and that the people chanted "la ilahe illallah" (There is no god but Allah), but they failed to fully grasp Islam and continued their old pagan traditions. By the late 18th century, Islam began to spread more rapidly among the Circassians. Throughout the 19th century, the vast majority of Circassians were Muslim. In 1826, Islam was declared the official religion of all Circassia.
