= Akhsar and Akhsartag =

- Region: Ossetia

Genealogy
- Parents: Warhag and Sainagon
- Spouse: Dzerassae
- Children: Uryzmaeg and Haemyts

Akhsar and Akhsartag (Ossetian: Æхсæр, Æхсæртæг) are twin brothers who are heroes in Ossetian mythology and sons of Warhag. Akhsartag is also the father of the narts Uryzmaeg and Haemyts.

== In the Nart saga ==
=== Birth ===
By old age, nart Warhag and his wife Sainagon had twin sons. To bring happiness to the newborns on their birthday, Warhag arranged a feast. Warhag invited many other Narts to the feast, among whom was the blacksmith Kurdalægon, who gave the newborns names and presented them with a flute. Akhsar and Akhsartag grew. The saga tells that the two brothers grew up by leaps and bounds, so much so that at a very young age armed with a bow and arrow they shot birds with such accuracy that the fame of the two sons of Warhag spread.

=== The guard at the Narts orchard ===
An apple tree grew in the Nart garden, which bore the only miraculous fruit that was stolen every night. Warhag told his sons to spend the night in the garden and look for the thief. While Akhsar was sleeping, his brother Akhsartag saw three doves (or foxes) fly in and he managed to hit one, but they ran away leaving a trail of blood. The two brothers chased the doves to the seashore, where Akhsartag dived to the bottom to continue his search.

Akhsartag ended up in the house of Donbettyr, the god of all waters, where his seven sons and two beautiful daughters were sitting with him, but the third wounded daughter Dzerassae was sitting in the next room and crying. They told Akhsartag that it was their three sisters who turned into doves and wanted to steal the golden apple of the Narts without knowing who the owner was.

Akhsartag revealed his identity and offered to cure her, then she recovered and they were married in a party that lasted nine days and nine nights and then remained to live at the bottom of the sea for whole weeks until Akhsartag remembered his brother. The couple went ashore, but when they arrived at the hut Akhsar was not there, as he went in search of his brother.

Here, the misunderstanding of history is made up for by the similarities between the two brothers: Akhsar returned from hunting and was taken by Dzerassae for her husband and he realizing that this was his brother's wife did not utter a word. Dzerassae was offended by him.

=== The death of the twins ===
Akhsartag returning saw his wife offended and thought that his brother had abused her, blinded by anger he killed him with a dagger, but realizing his mistake he could not bear the shame and fell on his own dagger. Dzerassae despaired for a long time until Uastyrdzhi arrived on a three-legged horse, to whom the widow explained what had happened and asked to bury two brothers.

== Comparative mythology ==
Mythologist Aleksandra Barkova finds an obvious similarity in a comparative analysis of the Ossetian tale about brothers with the Mayan myth about the twins. Abaev discovered a striking parallelism between the legend of Akhsar and Akhsartag and the Italian legend of Romulus and Remus, in particular the motif of the twins' connection with the water element. The Kabardian tale “Two Friends” should be added to the analogies, in which almost complete plot coincidence with the French novel about Amis et Amiles is found.

== See also ==
- Ossetian mythology
- Amis et Amiles
- Tale of Two Brothers
- Hoderi and Hoori
- Maya Hero Twins
- Divine twins
