= Satenik =

Alanian princess

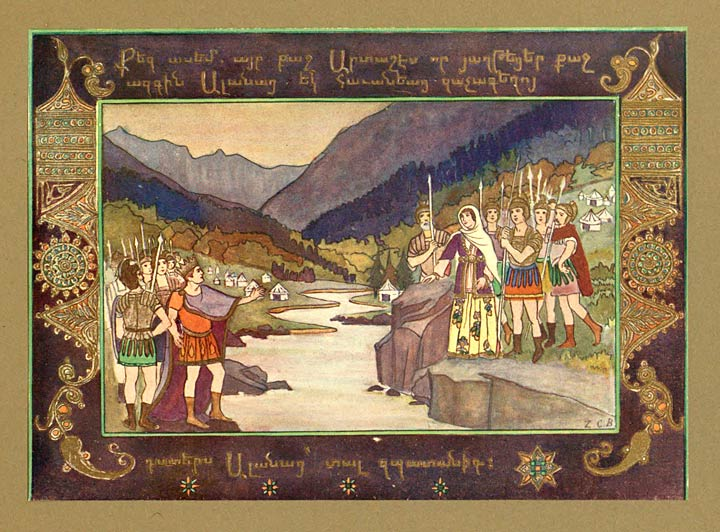
Painting of Artashes and Satenik at the Kura River, by Zabelle C. Boyajian.

Satenik (Old Armenian: Սաթենիկ, romanized: Satʻenik; also spelled Սաթինիկ Satʻinik) was an Alanian princess who, according to Armenian tradition, married Artashes, the king of Armenia. The Artashes in the tradition is identified with the 2nd-century BC king Artaxias I, although it is generally believed that the real historical basis for the story came from the invasion of Armenia by the Alans in the 1st century AD, during the reign of Tiridates I. The story of Artashes and Satenik forms a part of the ancient Armenian epic known as Vipasankʻ, fragments of which are recorded in the History of Armenia by the Armenian historian Movses Khorenatsi. Movses notes that the story, which he directly quotes, was a well-known epic during his time among the common people of Armenia, and that it was told by traveling storytellers and minstrels. The name and character of Satenik are connected with Satana, a figure in the folklore of the Ossetians and other peoples of the North Caucasus.

== Name ==
The name Satenik or Satinik (both versions appear in different manuscripts of Movses Khorenatsi's history) has the same ending as the Armenian feminine names like Varsenik and Nazenik. Hrachia Acharian tentatively suggests a derivation from the Armenian word satʻ 'amber'. D. Lavrov was the first scholar to note the similarity between the names of Satenik and Satana, the heroine of the North Caucasian Nart sagas. Variants of the name Satana exist in various Caucasian languages. Harold W. Bailey compared the name with Avestan sātar- 'ruling woman'. Others have compared it with the Scytho-Sarmatian name Satti(o)nos. (Note: For a survey of other proposed etymologies, see Dalalyan 2006.) Sonja Fritz and Jost Gippert propose a connection with the Scythian name Xarthanos, which is thought to derive from the Iranian word *xšathra- 'rule'. Satana, however, cannot be the inherited Ossetian form of a name deriving from *xšathra- because of phonological rules; it must have been re-borrowed from another language where the cluster -rt- was replaced with -t-. According to this theory, the older form of the name is reflected in the form Sartʻenik, which appears in one manuscript of Khorenatsi, and the Shapsug Adyghe name for Satana, Sərtənay. Armenian Sa(r)tʻenik can be derived from a variation of a name with the root *xšathra- (with a suffix, *xšathriĭān), leading to *sa(r)tean-, which is appended with the Armenian diminutive suffix -ik to produce Sa(r)tʻenik.

== Historicity ==
Khorenatsi describes Satenik as a historical figure but notes the existence of popular myths about her. Manuk Abeghian considers the stories about Satenik and Artashes to be part of the Armenian folk epic called Vipasankʻ. Vasily Abaev postulates the existence of an Armeno-Alanian epic cycle, of which Satenik was one of the characters. Georges Dumézil thought the legends about Satenik to be an entirely fictional cycle of an ancient Armenian epic. It has been suggested that the Alans who settled in the Artaz district of Armenia contributed to the creation of the character of Satenik.

Different historical Armenian kings are often conflated with one another in the Armenian epic tradition. The Artashes in the story of Artashes and Satenik is identified with Artaxias I (r. 189–159 BC), who built the capital of Artaxata and founded the Artaxiad dynasty. However, it is generally accepted that the real historical archetype for the character of Artashes in the legend of Artashes and Satenik was the later, 1st-century Armenian king Tiridates I. An Alan invasion of Parthia in the 72 AD is recorded by Josephus, who writes that the Armenian king Tiridates narrowly escaped capture by the Alans in battle. The epic cycle regarding Artashes and Satenik may have been composed on the basis of this historical event, with the earlier Armenian king Artashes being substituted for Tiridates in the epic.

Scholars also note the similarities between Satenik and another Alanian princess who married an Armenian king, Ashkhen, who was the wife of the 4th-century king Tiridates III. In Khorenatsi's history, both Artashes and Tiridates send a man named Smbat to bring the Alanian princess to them. (Note: Khorenatsi and an earlier Armenian historian Agathangelos, who also mentions Ashkhen, say nothing about her Alanian origin. Later Armenian sources do, possibly because of a confusion with Satenik.) The name Ashkhen is thought to derive from the Ossetian noun æxsin 'lady'. The Ossetian Satana is often referred to by the epithet æxsīn(æ). It has been suggested that Khorenatsi was drawing from the same information when writing about the two princesses, or that the royal couples of Artashes/Tiridates I–Satenik and Tiridates III–Ashkhen were conflated in the legends. Fritz and Gippert conclude that the historical nucleus of the information on Satenik in the Armenian sources is "[c]ertainly not much more than the legendary tradition about a young Alan lady named Satʿenik and/or Ašxēn who was married, under unusual circumstances, to an Armenian king named Tiridates/Trdat."

=== Parallels with Caucasian Satana ===
Scholars have noted numerous parallels between the legend of Artashes and Satenik and the traditions regarding the North Caucasian heroine Satana. Variants of Satana's name appear in nearly all of the epic traditions of the peoples of the Caucasus, except for Dagestan. Scholars believe Satana to have been the main goddess of the Alans. Both Satenik and Satana appear in stories in which they are subjected to bride-kidnapping: Satenik by Artashes, and Satana by her brother-husband Uryzmaeg. Both characters are involved in stories of adultery: Satenik with Artashes' rival Argavan, and Satana with Safa. In the Armenian epic, Artavazd, the son of Artashes and Satenik, fights Argavan, who was plotting to lure Artashes using a feast; in the Nart sagas, the Narts plot to kill Uryzmaeg at a feast, but he is saved by his nephew on Satana's orders. In one widespread story from the Nart sagas, a shepherd sees Satana from across a river and falls in love with her. Unable to cross the river, he leaves his semen on a nearby rock. Satenik realizes this and later returns to open the stone, finding her son Soslan-Sosruko. This is reminiscent of the story of Artashes seeing Satenik from across a river and being enchanted by her beauty.

== Legend ==
The story of Artashes and Satenik is presented by Movses Khorenatsi as follows. After conquering part of Iberia, the Alans moved further southwards, crossing the Kura River into Armenia. King Artashes of Armenia gathered a large force to meet the Alanian threat and a fierce war took place between the two sides, resulting in the capture of the young son of the Alanian king. The Alans were forced to retreat back to the Kura River and camped on the northern side of the river. Meanwhile, Artashes' army pursued them and established their camp on the southern side of the Kura. The Alanian king sued for peace and offered an eternal alliance between his people and the Armenians, promising to give Artashes anything he wanted for the release of his son, but the Armenian king refused to do so.

At this time, Satenik came near the shore and, through an interpreter, called on Artashes to release her brother:

Original Classical Armenian

Քեզ ասեմ, այր քաջ Արտաշէս,
Որ յաղթեցեր քաջ ազգին Ալանաց,
Ե՛կ հաւանեա՛ց բանից աչագեղոյ դստերս Ալանաց՝
Տալ զպատանիդ.
Զի վասն միոյ քինու ոչ է օրէն դիւցազանց՝
Այլոց դիւցազանց զարմից բառնալ զկենդանութիւն.
Կամ ծառայեցուցանելով ի ստրկաց կարգի պահել,
Եւ թշնամութիւն յաւիտենական
Ի մէջ երկոցունց ազգաց քաջաց հաստատել։

Transliteration (Hübschmann-Meillet)

Kʻez asem, ayr kʻaǰ Artašēs,
Or yałtʻecʻer kʻaǰ azgin Alanacʻ,
Ek hawaneacʻ banicʻ ačʻagełoy dsters Alanacʻ
Tal zpatanid.
Zi vasn mioy kʻinu očʻ ē orēn diwcʻazancʻ
Aylocʻ diwcʻazancʻ zarmicʻ baṙnal zkendanutʻiwn.
Kam caṙayecʻucʻanelov i strkacʻ kargi pahel,
Ew tʻšnamutʻiwn yawitenakan
I mēǰ erkocʻuncʻ azgacʻ kʻaǰacʻ hastatel։

English translation

I say to you, brave man Artashes,
Who has defeated the brave Alan people;
Come, consent to the request of the beautiful-eyed Alan princess
To return the youth.
For it is unbecoming of heroes for the sake of vengeance
To destroy the lives of the progeny of other heroes
Or by subjecting them to keep them in enslavement,
So that two valiant peoples
Are consigned to perpetual enmity.

Hearing these words, Artashes traveled down to the river and, upon seeing Satenik, was immediately captivated by her beauty. Artashes called for one of his close military commanders, Smbat Bagratuni, and, confessing his desire for Satenik, expressed his willingness to conclude the treaty with the Alans and ordered Smbat to bring her to him. Smbat dispatched messengers to the Alanian king, who gave the following reply:

Original Classical Armenian

Եւ ուստի տացէ քաջն Արտաշէս հազարս ի հազարաց եւ բիւրս ի բիւրուց ընդ քաջազգւոյ կոյս օրիորդիս Ալանաց։

Transliteration

Ew usti tacʻē kʻaǰn Artašēs hazars i hazaracʻ ew biwrs i biwrucʻ ənd kʻaǰazgwoy koys ōriordis Alanacʻ։

English translation

And whence shall brave Artashes give thousands upon thousands and tens of thousands upon tens of thousands for the maiden of the brave Alan people?

Artashes instead sought to abduct Satenik:

Original Classical Armenian

Հեծաւ արի արքայն Արտաշէս ի սեաւն գեղեցիկ,
Եւ հանեալ զոսկէօղ շիկափոկ պարանն,
Եւ անցեալ որպէս զարծուի սրաթեւ ընդ գետն,
Եւ ձգեալ զոսկէօղ շիկափոկ պարանն
Ընկէց ի մէջք օրիորդին Ալանաց.
Եւ շատ ցաւեցոյց զմէջք փափուկ օրիորդին,
Արագ հասուցանելով ի բանակն իւր:

Transliteration

Hecaw ari arkʻayn Artašēs i seawn gełecʻik,
Ew haneal zoskēōł šikapʻok parann,
Ew ancʻeal orpēs zarcui sratʻew ənd getn,
Ew jgeal zoskēōł šikapʻok parann
Ənkēcʻ i mēǰkʻ ōriordin Alanacʻ.
Ew šat cʻawecʻoycʻ zmēǰkʻ pʻapʻuk ōriordin,
Arag hasucʻanelov i banakn iwr:

English translation

Brave King Artashes mounted his handsome black [horse],
And taking out a red leather rope studded with golden rings,
And crossing the river like a sharp-winged eagle,
And throwing his red leather rope studded with golden rings,
Cast it upon the waist of the Alanian maiden,
And greatly hurt the delicate maiden's waist,
Quickly taking her back to his camp.

Khorenatsi considers this passage to be allegorical and writes that, rather than capturing Satenik with a "red leather rope studded with golden rings," Artashes actually paid as a bride price vast amounts of gold and red leather, the latter of which was highly valued by the Alans. According to another interpretation, the passage is not allegorical and is a literal account of bride abduction, which was considered more honorable during this period than formal acquiescence.

The two kings concluded a peace treaty, and a lavish and magnificent wedding took place. Movses, quoting from the epic, writes that during the wedding a "golden shower rained down" on Artashes and a "pearl shower" rained down on Satenik. It was a popular tradition among the Armenian king, according to Movses, to stand in front of the entrance of a temple and scatter money and to shower the queen's bedroom with pearls. Satenik became the first among Artashes' wives; that is, she was considered queen of Armenia. They had six sons: Artavazd, (Note: The historical Artavazd I, Artashes' successor, but mainly based on or conflated with the later Artaxiad king Artavazd II.) Vrоyr, Mazhan, Zareh, Tiran and Tigran.

The later relationship between Artashes and Satenik remains largely unknown. Earlier in History of Armenia, Khorenatsi writes that, according to the songs of Goghtn, Satenik had fallen in love with Argavan, who is described as a descendant of a race of dragons (vishaps in Armenian). (Note: Khorenatsi identifies the mythological Argavan with the historical prince Argam of the Muratsan dynasty, which, according to Khorenatsi, was of Median origin. References to višaps ('dragons') or višapazunkʻ ('descendants of the race of dragons') in the Armenian epic are interpreted by Khorenatsi as allegorical references to the Medes and their descendants in Armenia.) The remainder of the story that was sung by the minstrels is not recorded by Khorenatsi and is believed to be lost.

=== Later references ===
Later references to the story of Satenik in Armenian sources appear to rely on Khorenatsi's account directly or indirectly. The story of Satenik's marriage to Artashes is mentioned by the c. 10th-century historians Ukhtanes and Movses Kaghankatvatsi; the latter confuses the Alans (alankʻ) for the Caucasian Albanians (ałuankʻ). It is also rendered in six verses in the poetic history of Nerses the Gracious. At some point, Artashes and Satenik became associated with the tradition regarding the Christian saints Oski and Sukias, who were said to be pupils of the apostle Thaddeus. Versions of this tradition appear in the histories of Ukhtanes, Catholicos Hovhannes Draskhanakerttsi and Tovma Artsruni.
