= Haemyts =

Caucasus mythological figure

- Region: Caucasus

Genealogy
- Parents: Akhsartag and Dzerassae
- Spouse: Bytsenon
- Children: Batraz

Haemyts or Khamits (Ossetian: Хæмыц, Adyghe: Хъымыщ, Kabardian: Хъымыщ, Chechen: Хамчи, Ingush: Хамча, Abkhazian: Хмышь, Abaza: Хъмыщ, Karachay-Balkar: Хымыч) is the hero of the Nart saga of the peoples of the Caucasus, son of Akhsartag and Dzerassae, the father of the hero Batraz and the twin brother of Uruzmaeg, with whom they often went on conquest campaigns together.

== Etymology ==
Opinion of Vasily Abaev about the Mongolian roots of the origin of the name Khamyts (as an integral part of the name "Khabichi"), as a legacy of the old Ossetian-Mongolian relations is not shared by all experts.

== In the Nart saga ==
However, according to the plot of most of the Nart sagas Khamyts turns out to be a mediocre warrior who did not perform feats, but he possessed an extraordinary sword and the magic “Khamyts tooth”, nevertheless he was inferior to his brother Uruzmag in courage and was less responsible.

When the brothers guarded the mother's crypt from the penetration of Uastyrdzhi, Uruzmaeg was awake for the first two nights. On the third night when the turn of Khamyts came, he succumbed to the spell of singing coming from afar and left the “post”.

In the legend "Uatsamonga of the Narts" it is narrated how Khamyts drinks from the bowl of Uatsamonga. The bowl was full of all sorts of nasty and disgusting animals: snakes, frogs and lizards. They rose from Huatsamong and together with the drink rushed to the mouth of Khamyts, but he beat them with his damask mustache and they hid in the bottom of the bowl. So Khamyts drained Uatsamonga of the Narts.

=== Cruelty ===
In the legend "How the fandyr appeared" Khamyts proved himself to be an unworthy and cruel murderer.

In a year of famine, Syrdon stole his well-fed cow, slaughtered it and boiled it. While the cow's meat was being cooked in a cauldron, Syrdon went to the Nart nykhas and began to tease Khamyts. Suspicion crept into the soul of Khamyts, he left imperceptibly from nykhas and with the help of Syrdon's dog entered his underground dwelling. Enraged by what he saw (the meat of his cow was cooked in the cauldron), Khamyts chopped up the sons of Syrdon-on and threw them into the cauldron. Syrdon returned home and, taking the meat out of the cauldron, realized with horror what had happened.

=== Marriages and son ===
The legend about the marriage of Khamyts exists in 18 versions. In the first main version, once on a hunt Khamyts was amazed by the dexterity and kindness of a dwarf from the Bytsenon clan and Donbettyr's nephew who met him. Khamyts decided to marry one of the representatives of this family and he goes with the dwarf to Donbettyr to ask for the hand of their daughter.

Having heard about his consent to intermarry the Donbettyrs made it a condition for him to complete three most difficult tasks with which the groom coped: he caught and returned the hoop, ring and belt of Donbettyr's daughter thrown high into the sky. In eight versions of the legends, the daughter of Donbettyr appears in the form of a frog at night, throwing off her skin during the day she turns into a beauty, often she is a great needlewoman and can sew clothes for all the Narts or for Khamyts.

Bytsenon, becoming the wife of Khamyts still turned into a frog during the day and her husband carried it in his pocket or in his bosom. One day despite the pleas of his wife Khamyts brings her in his pocket to the Nart nykhas (meeting place). Syrdon easily guesses the secret of Khamyts and, in front of everyone he reproaches him with the fact that he brought his wife in his pocket for nykhas. When this became known Bytsenon could no longer live with Khamyts. Before leaving Bytsenon blowing on her husband's back and he developed a tumor. She said to tell Satana about it and when it's time to cut this tumor. Bytsenon said goodbye to Khamyts and forever went under water to her parental home.

When the time came Satana carefully cut the tumor on the back of Khamyts and a baby jumped out from there - it was his son Batraz.

However, Bytsenon was not the only wife of Khamyts. The second time he was married to the daughter of the Sun - Khorcheska. Satana as the wife of Khamyts is found in single legends, which is not typical for the saga.

==== The tooth ====
Between the twins Khamyts and Uruzmaeg a dispute often arose: which of them was the first to be born. Deciding to find out the brothers went to their aunt Kyzmyda. When they asked her about this Kyzmyda pointed to Uruzmaeg, because his horse stood on the right side along the course; Khamyts cursed her in anger, but Kyzmyda gave him Arkyz's tooth, which attracted women. In another version of the saga Arkyz himself rewarded Khamyts with his tooth.

=== Death and revenge ===
All researchers emphasize the special prevalence in the saga especially in the cycle dedicated to Batraz and his father, the theme of blood feud. The murder of Khamyts happened when Batraz was still a baby. When he grew up, he brutally took revenge on the Narts for the murder of Khamyts.

Khamyts, who had lost both strength and courage was killed by Sainag-Aldar and Burafarnyg; passion became his "Achilles' heel" and the cause of death. The offended Burafarnyg, whose wife (in the variants - a daughter) and seven daughters-in-law whom Khamyts seduced, did not dare to punish him himself, but turned to Sainag-aldar. One day Khamyts decided to go hunting. At a convenient moment, Sainag-Aldar stabbed him with a knife (variant - with a sword), which hit Arkyz's tooth. A piece broke off of it and flew up to the very sky; since then, a month has appeared in the sky. The killed Khamyts was brought home by his horse to the villages of the Narts.

The cause of Khamyts' death is in his behavior. His killers according to different versions of the legends are different. In one of the versions this is the malik of the city of Tynty, in others - Sainag-Aldar, in the third - Burafarnyg, in the fourth - Chelakhsartag, in the fifth - Maruko, Borat's nephew. Meanwhile, the “tooth” brought Khamyts as much misfortune as happiness: he paid with his life. In another legend he is “stoned”, which according to T. A. Khamitsaeva "associated with the ancient custom of stoning for adultery".

== Comparative mythology ==
As Khamyts bore Batraz in his back, Zeus in Greek mythology sewed the fetus into his thigh and also gave birth to Dionysus.

A parallel also can be drawn with one of the plots about the cruelty of Khamyts: those who were at the court of Cyaxares and undeservedly insulted by him (due to unsuccessful hunting for game), in revenge decided to cut into pieces one of the boys who were in their training (the art of archery). Then, having gutted the meat of wild animals, as usual, they served Cyaxares on the table as hunting prey.

== See also ==
- Uruzmaeg
- Batraz
- Ossetian mythology
