= List of smithing gods =

Deities associated with blacksmiths

This is a list of deities associated with blacksmiths and craftspeople.

The African and Ancient Greek blacksmith deities have been compared and contrasted in scholarly literature.

== African religions ==
=== Egyptian ===
- Ptah, patron god of craftsmen and architects

=== Igbo ===
- Ikenga, Alusi of time, success, achievement, farming, blacksmiths, and industry

=== Yoruba ===
- Ogun, patron god of warriors, soldiers, blacksmiths, metal workers, and craftsmen

== Asian religions ==
=== Arabian ===
- Qaynan, Sabean patron god of smiths

=== Hindu ===
- Ribhus
- Vishvakarman, architect of the gods

=== Japanese ===
- Ame-no-Mahitotsu, god of metal-working and blacksmiths
- Kagu-tsuchi, patron god of blacksmiths, ceramic workers, and fire

=== Meitei ===
- Pisatao, god of architecture and crafts

=== Vietnam ===
- Bà Kim, goddess of metal and blacksmithing
- Tổ nghề Khổng Lồ, god of bronze casting

=== Ugaritic ===
- Kothar-wa-Khasis, patron god of metalworking

== European religions ==
=== Celtic ===
- Brigid, goddess of spring, blacksmiths, fertility, healing, and poetry
- Gobannus, Gallo-Roman deity whose name means 'the smith'
- Gofannon, Welsh god of blacksmithing, ale, architecture and building
- Goibniu, Irish god of blacksmithing, one of the Trí Dée Dána
- Lugh, god of craftsmen, games, arts, oaths, truth, and law

=== Circassian ===
- Tlepsh, god of fire, smithing, metal, weapons and virility

=== Finnish ===
- Ilmarinen, god of Blacksmithing and archetypal artificer.

=== Greek ===
- Athena, goddess of wisdom, handicraft, and warfare
- Hephaestus, god of metalworking and the forge

=== Hungarian ===
- Hadúr, god of metalworking and war

=== Germanic/Norse ===
- Wayland the Smith, legendary master blacksmith (in some sources considered as with god-like origins)

=== Ossetian ===
- Kurdalægon, god of blacksmiths

=== Roman ===
- Vulcan, god of metalworking and the forge

=== Slavic ===
- Svarog, god of the forge, fire, the sun, and creation

=== Baltic ===
- Kalvis, god of blacksmiths who creates the sun every day and makes rings so the morning star (Aušrinė) can marry the sun.

== See also ==
- List of fire gods
