= Pkharmat =

Mythological hero of the Vainakh people

Pkharmat (Chechen: Пхьармат, romanized: Pẋarmat, lit. 'creator of the nation/language/land') is a legendary hero of the Vainakh people who stole fire for mankind, thus allowing them to forge metal, cook food, and light their homes, and uniting the people into a nation. For this Pkharmat was punished by being chained to Mount Kazbek. Pkharmat is the Vainakh equivalent of the Greek hero Prometheus and the Georgian hero Amirani, among others.

== Tale ==
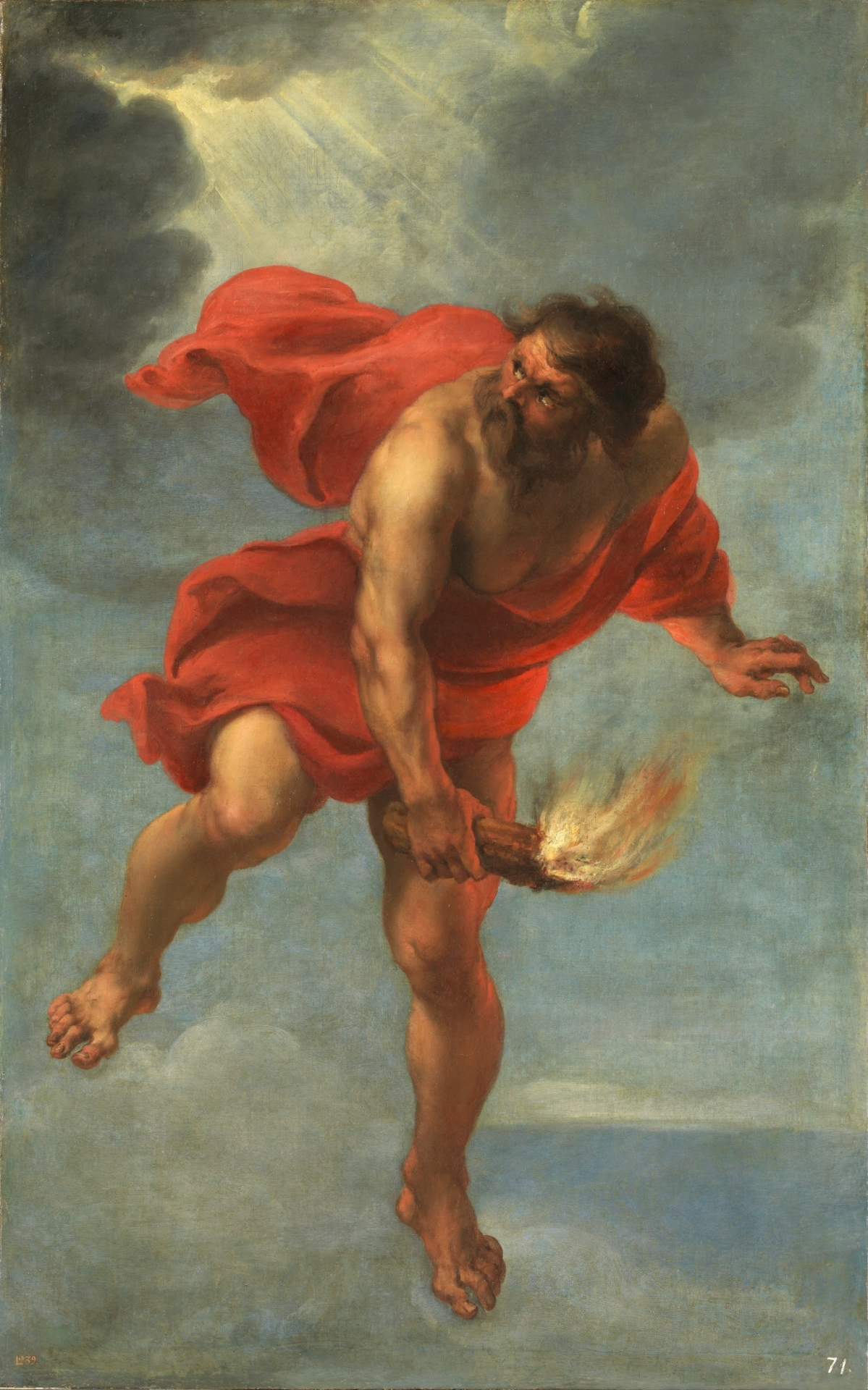
Prometheus Carrying Fire by Jan Cossiers

Pkharmat was a demigod, or Nart, who loved and pitied his people, for they had no fire. The only fire in the world was kept by the cruel god Sela, the god of the stars, thunder and lightning. Sela would drive his fire-chariot across the heavens and fire lightning-arrows down to earth, to demonstrate his strength and to suppress the Narts.

Because they had no fire, the Narts ate raw food and cold milk, and had no agriculture. For a long time the Narts led a miserable life. Sela knew it and was glad to see them so miserable — as were all the other gods, except Sela's wife Sata. Sata cared for the Narts, but she was afraid of her husband.

One day, there appeared a brave hero, Pkharmat. Pkharmat knew of the fire in Hell (Chechen: ЖуьжгIати, Zhüzhghati) on the top of Mount Bashlam. One day he decided to steal it. He forged without heat for his journey a coat, a sword, and a shield out of bronze. He mounted his horse, Turpal, and began his journey.

Sata took the form of a bird and alighted upon the mountain's summit. She spoke to Pkharmat with a human voice: "O powerful Nart, you have not reached the summit of Bashlam by chance. You have come to fetch fire." Pkharmat answered, "The people are in need of heat, of light. I shall return to Earth only if I succeed in bringing back fire!" Having seen how strong the Nart and his horse were, Sata promised to help him in his quest for fire. She advised him how to go about obtaining some, and warned him of the possible danger and of Sela's cruelty.

Pkharmat had also received help from his older brother, who gave him a carz, a reed-like plant with a soft inner pith, with a piece of coal in it. The coal was very much attracted to the fire; as it burned, its sparks bored into the carz, eventually making eight holes and turning the carz into a reed pipe, which could make music, formerly unknown to the Narts.

Pkharmat leaped over Hell and seized a burning piece of wood. Sela, enraged that a Nart had acted in defiance of his will, set off at once in hot pursuit, but, so swift was Pkharmat’s noble steed, Turpal, that the angry god was unable to catch him. Nothing daunted, Sela untied the skein in which he kept the darkness of night and let it loose, so that Pkharmat quickly lost his way in the gloom. The kindly Sata, however, still in her bird form, flew to his aid, guiding him through the darkness. Baulked again of his prey, Sela untied his other two skeins in which were kept storm and terrible cold, yet the valiant Pkharmat and his fiery steed overcome these obstacles too and struggled onward through the howling blizzard to the great cave where all the Narts had gathered together for protection from the cold, the storm, and the darkness. He gave them the fire and told them, "Here is fire for you! Multiply and become a great tribe. Warm yourselves; illuminate your homes, the caves, the towers; cook, prepare food from now on. Rejoice!"

After that Sela sent his servant cyclops, Uja, to punish the unfaithful Pkharmat. Uja chained Pkharmat to the peak of Mount Bashlam with chains of bronze. The falcon Ida comes to Pkharmat every morning. According to the will of Sela, it sits upon Pkharmat's knees and tears at his liver with its beak.

== Turpal ==
Turpal was a legendary horse capable of outrunning lightning, which always roamed free, grazing among seven mountains, and drinking sea-water. Pkharmat chose Turpal as his horse, knowing that not even Sela's lightning bolts would allow him to catch Pkharmat on Turpal, which forced Sela to untie his skeins. Turpal means "hero" in Nakh languages and is used as a male name.

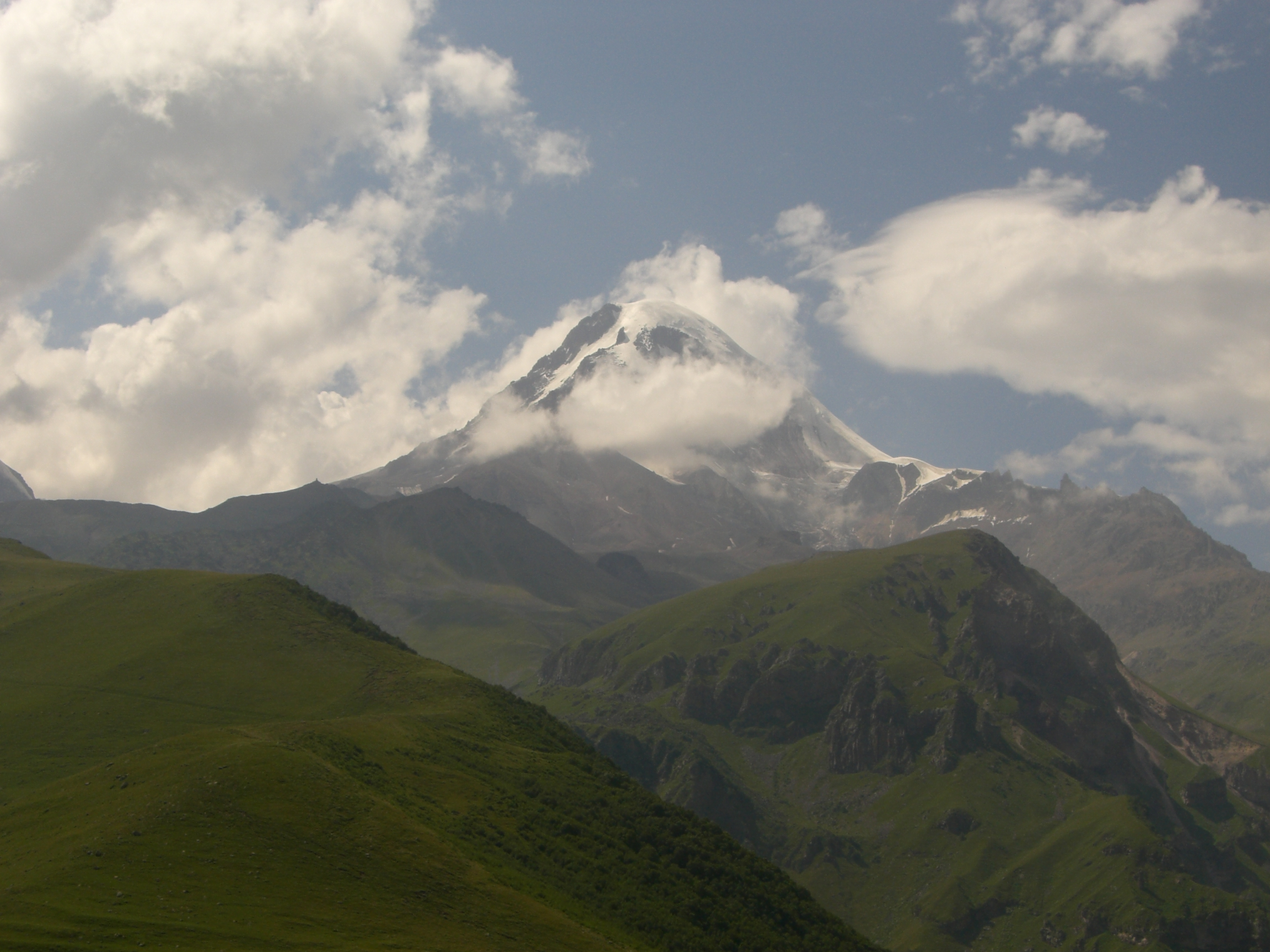
Mount Bashlam

== Mount Bashlam ==
Bashlam is known to most of the world as Mount Kazbek. Nowadays frozen Mount Bashlam is the place on top of which Sela's burning hell was placed. Bashlam is a dormant stratovolcano and one of the chief mountains of the Caucasus located in Georgia. Bashlam's last eruption was circa 750 BC and certain motifs present in the legend may derive from memories of the fiery lava and dark ash clouds of a volcanic eruption. Bashlam is the Nakh name of the Mount Kazbek, translated as Molten Mount. Bashlam has always been a sacred site for the Nakh and home of the Akkhi and Nart-Orstkhoy tukkhums.

== Equivalents of Pkharmat in other traditions ==
Figures similar to Pkharmat appear in various other traditions: Greek, Armenian, Circassian, Abkhaz, Georgian, Ossete, Roman, and so on. However, there are notable differences between the different versions of the so-called "Prometheus" figure.

=== Nature of god opposed by hero ===
In all versions, the "Prometheus" figure fights against a powerful god who has denied humanity fire. However, other characteristics of this god vary:

- Greek version – Prometheus and Zeus

In the Greek version, the god Prometheus confronts is in fact the main head of the patriarchal pantheon, Zeus, who is almost always viewed in a positive light, as the loving All-Father, as the wise ruler of all, etc. The tale of Prometheus is one of the few instances where he is viewed negatively. Zeus guards the fire to keep humanity down, because he knows that once humanity has fire, it can make weapons, and progress, leading eventually to an ability to overthrow his rule. In some versions he also reasons that humanity is better off in ignorance and backwardness, without fire, often symbolized by its destructive nature contrasting its use for industry.

- Greek version – Kronos and Ouranos

In another Greek tale, Ouranos, Zeus' grandfather was originally the ruler of the universe. He ruled with an iron fist and had a paranoid fear of being overthrown, leading him to oppress his own children, the First Generation Titans (6 males-including Kronos, the youngest- and 6 females). This tale did not involve any stealing of fire, but, rather, the overthrow of Ouranos by Kronos (Uranus by Saturn in the highly similar Latin version) brought the knowledge of agriculture to humankind. For Greeks and other Indo-Europeans, agriculture did not require fire, so the tales of how humankind acquired them are separate.

- Vainakh version

For the most part, the Vainakh version is extremely similar to the Greek version of Prometheus. However, rather than the head of the pantheon, as Zeus is, Sela is a major god, but he is not the head of the pantheon (which would be Dela). Like Zeus, Sela owns thunder and lightning and uses lightning as a weapon. However, he shares certain characteristics with the Greek Uranus: he is the god of stars and the sky. Sela's personality also resembles that of Uranus.

=== Nature of the hero ===
The Pkharmat-character is variously a god, a demigod or a mortal.

=== Gifts given to man and significance ===
- Vainakh version

Humankind attains both fire and agriculture as a result of the conflict between Pkharmat and Sela. Humankind also attains its first instrument - the reedpipe - from the affair, and with it, music, which in Vainakh culture is considered very important and was thought to have mystical properties. In addition to fire, agriculture, the reedpipe, and music, the origin of coal (given to Pkharmat while inside the carz) and how man obtains it is also explained.

- Greek version

Humankind is only given fire, with which it can make tools. This exemplifies the importance of the forge in Indo-European culture. The Greek equivalent of the Vainakh carz is the hollow giant fennel stalk in which Prometheus transports the fire from heaven to earth - as described in Hesiod’s Theogony (565–566) and Works and Days (50) and Pseudo-Apollodorus (Bibliotheca, 1.7.1).

== Relevance to the debate about the homeland of the Indo-European language family ==
The indigenous religious traditions featuring a figure equivalent to Pkharmat are those of peoples of the Caucasus and some Indo-European peoples, both in the Caucasus and elsewhere. This seems to support the hypothesis that the original homeland of the Indo-European peoples lay to the immediate north of the Caucasus touching both the Black and Caspian Seas and possibly extending north along the Volga as well as somewhat west into Ukraine. This hypothesis (known as the Kurgan hypothesis) is now the most widely accepted, as opposed to the hypotheses that the Indo-European languages originated in the Anatolian plains, in the Armenian highland, in India, in the Balkans, or in the ancestral Slavic homelands, or that they were a sprachbund. Comparison of the various versions of the stories also support that the original Indo-Europeans probably had more intense cultural exchange with the North Caucasus than the South Caucasus: the forms most close to the Indo-European versions of the tale are, in fact, the Circassian version and the Vainakh version. The Circassian and Abkhaz name for the hero is Pataraz, which shows very noticeable similarity to the Greek name Prometheus, which is similar to most other Indo-European versions; comparing these two, it is also possible to note Pkharmat's similarity. It is possible that Pataraz, Prometheus, Pkharmat, and possibly others, are all roots from the same original name.

== In popular culture ==
- Russian poet Sergey Stratanovsky's poetic drama Pkharmat in Chains (2001) is based on the myth.

== See also ==
- Vainakh mythology
- Nakh peoples
- Nart saga
