= Uryzmaeg =

Hero of the Nart saga of the peoples of the Caucasus

Uruzmaeg
- Region: North Caucasus

Genealogy
- Parents: Akhsartag and Dzerassae
- Spouse: Elda, Satanaya

Uryzmaeg (Note: Iron: Уырызмæг, romanized: Uyryzmæg; Digorian: Орæзмæг/Урузмæг, romanized: Oræzmæg/Uruzmaeg; Adyghe: Орзэмэд/Озырмэс, romanized: Orzămăd/Ozərmăs; Kabardian: Уэзырмэс, romanized: Wuɛzəmɛs; Chechen: Орзми, romanized: Orzmi; Ingush: Урузман, romanized: Uruzman; Abkhazian/Abaza: Уазырмас, romanized: Uazərmas; Karachay-Balkar: Ёрюзмек, romanized: Yoryuzmek) is the hero of the Nart saga of the peoples of the North Caucasus, son of Akhsartag and Dzerassae.

== In the Nart saga ==
=== Birth of Uryzmaeg and Haemyts ===
Akhsartag descended to the bottom of the sea after a dove that stole magical apples from the Narts' garden, discovered that it was Dzerassae, healed and married her, leaving her pregnant afterwards. Then the hero, through a tragic misunderstanding committed suicide by killing his brother. The wife returned to her father's house and lived there.

When her pregnancy became apparent, her mother advised her to go live on Nart hill, she obeyed and when she arrived in the village, she behaved like a daughter-in-law towards her father-in-law, which aroused the curiosity of the peasants. The sisters-in-law went to find out, but she did not reveal her identity, nor did she reveal it to the village elders. Dzerassae took one of the elders aside and revealed her identity to her as she was led to the Akhsartag Tower. Refusing to go upstairs to the stable of the tower she gave birth to two sons, who were named Uryzmaeg and Haemyts.

=== The death of the mother and the birth of Satana ===
The twins grew strong and swift. After a revelation received from the prophetess, Uruzmaeg and his brother found out that one of their ancestors was still alive, they set off in search. They found their grandfather Warhag and were recognized by him and when they shaved him, they were surprised to find that he was quite young. Later the two brothers went after their mother, who returned to her father Donbettyr's house underwater, and as a result the brothers' mother married their grandfather. But a year after that, Dzerassae fell ill and died, asking her sons to guard her body for the first three nights.

For the first two nights, Uruzmaeg did it and on the third night he asked Haemyts to spend the night. However, Haemyts went to the wedding feast, leaving his mother's tomb unattended. At this time Uastirdzhi appeared and from his connection with Dzerassae in the underworld, the next day, the girl Satana, one of the most important figures in the saga, was born.

=== Marriages ===
Uryzmaeg soon married Elda from the Alagata clan and his half-sister Satana came to the conclusion that Uryzmaeg was the most valiant among the Narts. Some time later, Uryzmaeg went on a year-long expedition instructing his wife to prepare a feast for his return.

As the term drew to a close Elda began to prepare a drink called rong, but it did not ferment due to the sorcery of Satana, who later offered to ferment the drink if Elda would lend her her clothes and shawl. On the evening after the feast, Satana entered Uruzmaeg's room, thus dressed as his wife and by sorcery kept him there for a long time, while Elda died of a broken heart in despair. Elda was buried with honors and Satana treacherously became the wife of Uruzmaeg.

When the effect of witchcraft ended Uruzmaeg realized that he had entered into a relationship with his half-sister and his poor wife died. He thought sadly how the other Narts would react to this. Then Satana suggested that he ride among the Narts on a donkey upside down three times: the first time they laughed, the second time there was laughter, but also grief for the behavior of the bravest of the Narts and the third time no one laughed, but wondered if there was a reason for it.

Uruzmaeg realized that the Narts would soon forget their coexistence with Satana: the first time they were seen together, they were mocked, the second time some still laughed, the third time no one laughed and the two had the right to continue their union.

=== In other episodes ===
Uryzmaeg had an unnamed son who helped him defeat mythical creatures in the country of Terk-Turk.

One of the main four cycles of the saga is dedicated to the harmonious relationship between Uryzmaeg and Satana, but they are also mentioned in other cycles. "Their relationship to each other is imbued with unchanging love and care".

According to Vasily Abaev, the myth of Uryzmaeg and Satana is a myth about the first human or divine couple overgrown with later layers.

Once the Narts went to the witch to find out the answer to the question of who the best of the Narts is, she answered them: the best among men is Uruzmaeg, and among women Satana.

He more than once led the army of the Narts, called to battle and exterminated the huge army of the enemy. One of the strengths of Uruzmaeg, for which he was especially honored, was helping the needy, close attention to the problems of ordinary Narts, to those who needed support.

Uruzmaeg teaches a lesson to other Narts in married life as well. Raising a toast to the health and happiness of the young at the weddings, some Ossetians today will say "I wish you to grow old together like Uruzmaeg and Satana!" (Ossetian: Уырызмæг æмæ Сатанайау æмзæронд баут!, romanized: Uyryzmæg æmæ Satanajau æmzærond baut!)

Uruzmaeg was an example to follow in everything. "Prudence, endurance, resourcefulness in the moment of danger these are the distinguishing features of the elder among the Narts".

=== Last years ===
When Uryzmaeg got old and stopped participating in military campaigns the Nart youth stopped respecting him and some laughed at him. This motif has parallels in the life of the Scythians and Alans - according to Ammianus Marcellinus, the Alans "consider happy the one who breathes his last in battle and they persecute the elderly or those who died from accidental diseases with cruel ridicule, like degenerates and cowards".

== Comparative mythology ==
The ancestors of the Akhsartagat clan were the twins Akhsar and Akhsartag, the sons of Akhsartag Uruzmaeg and Haemyts are also twins; twin myths are widespread in the mythology of many peoples of the world and twins act as culture heroes.

The sacred incest is common in the mythology of many peoples. Close to the Ossetian motif of the marriage of a brother and sister is the Indian myth of Yami's love for her own twin brother Yama set forth in the Rigveda. In Iranian mythology the Ossetian motif of the marriage of a brother and sister corresponds to the Avestan cultural hero and the legendary king Yima, who also married to his own sister.

Vsevolod Miller compared the plot with the Persian legend about the murder of his son Sohrab by Rostam and moreover, Rostam like Uruzmaeg did not know that he was killing his son. The same motif Vasily Abaev finds in the cycle of Ilya Muromets of the Russian epic poem. Dumézil reacted positively to this parallels emphasizing that it cannot be accidental that two "Rostams" themes occur in the same Nart plot: the murder of his son by the father and the giant eagle that delivered Uruzmaeg to the underwater a kingdom reminiscent of the bird Simurgh from Shahnameh, as well as the fabulous Gray Eagle threatening Ilya Muromets in the middle of the sea.

== See also ==
- Ossetian mythology
- Akhsar and Akhsartag
- Satanaya
- Iranian mythology
