= Dzerassae =

Mythological figure

Dzerassæ (Ossetian: Дзерассæ) is a figure in Ossetian mythology best known as the daughter of the water deity Donbettyr and the mother of several Nart saga heroes. She was the wife of Akhsartag. With him, she was the mother of the twin heroes Uryzmaeg and Haemyts. She was also the mother of Syrdon, with Gaetaeg. After her death, the archangel Uastyrdzhi revived her and they became lovers in her tomb. Her daughter, the Nart Satanaya, was born thereafter.

She was usually depicted with golden hair, and was able to change her shape into a deer or a fish. Anthropologist Kevin Tuite has noted that this makes her similar to the Svan goddess Dali, who was also golden-haired and could change into animals.

The Dzerassa Planitia on Venus is named for Dzerassae.
