= Tlepsh =

Mythological figure

Tlepsh (Adyghe Лъэпш [ɬapʃ]) is a mythological figure who appears (as a blacksmith and also a powerful leader) in some cycles of the Nart sagas of the Caucasus, in which his Ossetian counterpart is the smith Kurdalægon. Tlepsh's name is a borrowing from Indo-European languages into Circassian, cognate with Ancient Greek χάλυψ (khálups) borrowed into Latin as chalybs - 'iron' - Tlepsh is thus the embodiment of the metal with which he works.

== Description ==
Tlepsh, as the smith of the semi-divine Narts, is a figure comparable to (among others) Hephaestos in Greek mythology, Vulcan in Roman mythology and Wayland and the Sons of Ivaldi in Germanic mythology. In many cycles he is portrayed as being close with Satanaya.

Colarusso (2002) finds remarkable similarities between Tlepsh and the Scandinavian deity Odin to be revealed in the tale "Tlepsh and Lady Tree" (number 17 in his anthology of Nart sagas), which tells how Tlepsh, goaded by Satanaya, sets off in quest of knowledge and not only encounters a sentient, female axis mundi, recalling the world-tree Yggdrasil, but actually begets upon her a child - the Milky Way.

A further parallel to a tale from Germanic mythology is apparent in Colarusso's tale 21, "Tlepsh's Gold Cellar" as, in an episode attributed to the historic king Guntram of Burgundy (recorded in Grimm's Teutonic Mythology), the wandering soul of a hero who has fallen asleep, manifested as a small creeping creature, and aided by the hero's servant, discovers a treasure, before returning once more to his body to reanimate it, thus awakening him from his slumbers. The hero believes himself to have been on a long journey, crossing an iron bridge to reach a treasure cave, when in fact his tiny, 'soul-creature' has travelled but a short distance, crossing and re-crossing - in the Germanic version the flat of a sword laid over a little stream and in the Circassian a short length of iron laid over a water butt or quenching-bath - to reach and return from a little hole or crevice.

This folk-tale motif of an externalised soul taking the form of a small creeping animal (fly / grub / worm / snake) bears out Colarusso's perception of a similarity between Tlepsh and Odin when compared with an episode from the tale of Odin's theft of the mead of poetry, in which the god shape-shifts into the form of a snake, in order to creep though a narrow aperture to reach the chamber in the heart of the mountain Hnitbjörg, which houses the precious liquor. To this series of parallels can also be added the motif of the sword-bridge (compare Chinvat Bridge and As-Sirāt) leading to the water-girt otherworld realm of Goirre (scribal error for 'Voirre' - 'glass') in Chrétien de Troyes' Lancelot, Knight of the Cart, an early Arthurian romance rooted in Celtic mythology.

The other two tales concerning Tlepsh included in Colarusso's anthology have a more overt connection with the Nart leader's mastery of smithcraft, for in one he fashions the first sickle and in the other a razor-sharp sword.

It is noteworthy that in "How They Made Tlepsh Fashion the First Sickle" Tlepsh does not actually invent/design the tool in question. He does, however, know which female supernatural being the other Narts need to consult in order to find out how to design it, namely the old wife of the harvest god T'haghalig (compare the Cailleach, reaping and sovereignty goddess of the goidelic-speaking Celts). In yet a further remove, T'haghalig's wife does not know how to design the sickle herself, but knows that it is Lady Isp, the mother of the Nart hero Pataraz (Ossetian Batradz / Batraz) who will be able to do so - which does indeed prove to be the case. Lady Isp, a clever, frog-like little water-sprite (compare The Frog Princess) inadvertently reveals that 'Like a rooster's tail you should bend it, like a baby snake's tooth you should sharpen it...' and, using this description, Tlepsh is able to forge the wondrous new tool, giving it an edge that never grows dull no matter how often it is used.

In the tale "How Nart Tlepsh Killed Bearded Yamina with the Avenging Sword" Tlepsh has become too old to wield a weapon but demonstrates instead his formidable magical skills by fashioning what is essentially a lethal jack-in-the-box, containing 'a sword that could move under its own power'. The 'Bearded Yamina' of the title is the personification of the disease cholera, who/which has killed Tlepsh's son. When at dusk, as instructed by Tlepsh's messenger, Yamina takes the mysterious closed chest he has been sent as a present to a private room in his house and opens it, 'the sword, which had lain at the bottom, rose of its own, sliced through Bearded Yamina, and so killed him'.

Despite the brevity of this blackly comic little tale, it nonetheless manages to cast further light on Tlepsh's shamanic credentials, namely his mastery of fire and metal (in forging the sword), his ability to confront the demons of disease and his innate proto-theatricality (a shaman being, for his or her pre-scientific society, technician, doctor and entertainer, rolled into one).

The curious self-propelled (and seemingly sentient) sword forged by Tlepsh to exact his terrible revenge is furthermore reminiscent of similar weapons featuring in Celtic mythology and the Arthurian romances which draw upon it - e.g. the self-moving sword present in the Arthurian motif of the Bed Perilous, as used, for example, in the early romance Le Chevalier à l'épée (See also Magic sword).
