= Twins in mythology =

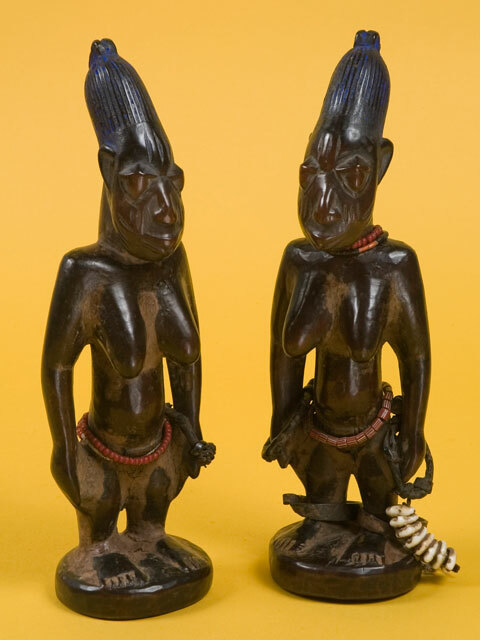
A pair of early 20th-century female ere ibeji twin figures (Children's Museum of Indianapolis)

Twins in mythology are in many cultures around the world. In some cultures they are seen as ominous, and in others they are seen as auspicious. Twins in mythology are often cast as two halves of the same whole, sharing a bond deeper than that of ordinary siblings, or seen as fierce rivals. They can be seen as representations of a dualistic worldview. They can represent another aspect of the self, a doppelgänger, or a shadow.

== Depictions ==
Twins are often depicted with special powers. This applies to both mortal and immortal sets of twins, and often is related to power over the weather. Twins in mythology also often share deep bonds. In Greek mythology, Castor and Pollux share a bond so strong that when mortal Castor dies, Pollux gives up half of his immortality to be with his brother. Castor and Pollux are the Dioscuri twin brothers. Their mother is Leda, a being who was seduced by Zeus who had taken the form of a swan. Even though the brothers are twins, they have two different fathers. This phenomenon is a very common interpretation of twin births across different mythological cultures. Castor's father is Tyndareus, the king of Sparta (hence the mortal form). Pollux is the son of Zeus (demigod). These brothers were sometimes said to be born from an egg alongside their sister Helen. This teleologically explains why their constellation, the Dioskouroi or Gemini, is only seen during one half of the year, as the twins split their time between the underworld and Mount Olympus. In an aboriginal tale, the same constellation represents the twin lizards who created the plants and animals and saved women from evil spirits. Another example of this strong bond shared between twins is the Ibeji twins from African mythology. Ibeji twins are viewed as one soul shared between two bodies. If one of the twins dies, the parents then create a doll that portrays the body of the deceased child, so the soul of the deceased can remain intact for the living twin. Without the creation of the doll, the living twin is almost destined for death because it is believed to be missing half of its soul. Twins in mythology are often associated with healing. They are also often gifted with the ability of divination or insight into the future.

Divine twins in twin mythology are identical to either one or both place of a god. The Feri gods are not separated entities but are unified into one center. These divine twins can function alone in one body, either functioning as a male or as male and female as they desire. Divine twins represent a polarity in the world. This polarity may be great or small and at times can be opposition. Twins are often seen to be rivals or adversaries.

== By culture ==
=== Africa ===
==== Egyptian ====
- Nut, the sky goddess, and Geb, god of the earth.
- Osiris - Isis' twin and husband. Lord of the underworld. First born of Geb and Nut. One of the most important gods of ancient Egypt.
- Isis - Daughter of Geb and Nut; twin of Osiris.

==== West African ====
- Mawu-Lisa - Twins representing moon and sun, respectively. Ewe-Fon culture.
- Yemaja - Mother of all life on earth. Yoruba culture.
- Aganju - Twin and husband of Yemaja
- Ibeji - Twins of joy and happiness. Children of Shango and Oshun.

=== Amerindian ===
- Gluskap and Malsumis - A cultural hero and its evil twin brother for the Wabanaki peoples.
- Hahgwehdiyu and Hahgwehdaetgah - Sons of either Iroquois sky goddess Atahensic or her daughter Tekawerahkwa.
- Asdzą́ą́ Nádleehé and Yolkai Estsan - Navajo goddesses.
- Monster Slayer and Born-for-Water - Navajo Hero Twins.
- Jukihú and Juracán - Twin sons of Atabex (Mother Nature), the personifications of Order and Chaos, respectively; from the Taíno Arawak nation which once stretched from South America through the Caribbean and up to Florida in the US.
- Hun-apu and Ixbalanque, the Maya Hero Twins - Defeated the Seven Macaw
- Quetzalcoatl and Xolotl or Tezcatlipoca
- Xochipilli and Xochiquetzal - God and goddess of sex, beauty and love.
- Kokomaht and Bahotahl - Good and evil forces in nature.

=== Ancient Mesopotamian religion ===
- Inanna and Utu.
- Lugal-irra and Meslamta-ea.

=== Greek and Roman mythology ===
- Divine
  - Apollo and Artemis - God and goddess, children of Zeus and Leto
  - Hypnos and Thanatos - Sons of Nyx
  - Despoina and Arion - Goddess and immortal horse, children of Demeter and Poseidon.
  - Palici - Sicilian chthonic deities in Greek mythology and Roman mythology.
- One divine, one mortal
  - Heracles and Iphicles - Though their mother was Alcmene, Hercules was son of Zeus while Iphicles was son of Amphitryon.
  - Castor and Pollux, known as the Dioscuri - Though their mother was Leda, Castor was mortal son of Tyndareus, the king of Sparta, while Pollux was the divine son of Zeus.
- Children of a god or nymph and a mortal
  - Belus and Agenor - Sons of Poseidon and Libya.
  - Aegyptus and Danaus - Sons of Belus and Achiroe, a naiad daughter of Nile.
  - Aeolus and Boeotus - Sons of Poseidon and Arne.
  - Lycastus and Parrhasius - Sons of Ares and Phylonome, daughter of Nyctimus of Arcadia.
  - Amphion and Zethus - Sons of Zeus by Antiope
  - Centaurus and Lapithes - Sons of Ixion and Nephele or Apollo and Stilbe.
  - Pelias and Neleus - Sons of Poseidon and Tyro.
  - Romulus and Remus - Central characters of Rome's foundation myth. Sons of Rhea Silvia by either the god Mars, or by the demi-god Hercules.
  - Eurytus and Cteatus - Sons of Molione either by Actor or Poseidon
  - Ascalaphus and Ialmenus - Sons of Ares and Astyoche, Argonauts who participated in the Trojan War.
- Mortal
  - Byblis and Caunus - Children of King Miletus and Tragasia or Cyanee.
  - Kleobis and Biton - Sons of Cydippe, a priestess of Hera in Argos.
  - Crisus and Panopeus - Sons of Phocus and Asterodia.
  - Iasus and Pelasgus - Sons of Phoroneus or Triopas.
  - Proetus and Acrisius - Rival twins, sons of Abas and Aglaea or Ocalea.
  - Porphyrion and Ptous - Sons of Athamas and Themisto.
  - Thessalus and Alcimenes - Sons of Jason and Medea.
  - Theraephone and Theronice - Daughters of Dexamenus, wives of Eurytus and Cteatus.
  - Thoas and Euneus - Sons of Jason and Hypsipyle.
  - Cassandra and Helenus - Children of King Priam and Queen Hecuba of Troy with prophetic powers.
  - Procles and Eurysthenes - Great-great-great-grandsons of Heracles, sons of Aristodemus and Argia.
  - Sisyphus and Salmoneus - Rivals who angered Zeus with their deceit and hubris. Sons of King Aeolus of Thessaly and Enarete.

=== Norse mythology ===
- Freyr and Freyja - God and goddess, children of Njörðr.
- Baldr and Hodr - "The Shining One" and "The Blind God", sons of Odin and Frigg.
- Móði and Magni - Courage/Bravery and Strength. Although not Twins in every Source, they often come in a pair. In some iterations, twin sons of Thor and Sif.
- Sigmund and Signy - Characters of the Völsunga saga, children of King Völsung.

=== Hinduism ===
- The Ashvins - Sons of the sun God, Surya. Represent dualities such as building and destroying.
- Dhrishtadyumna and Draupadi - Mythical figures from the Mahabharata.
- Koti and Chennayya - Twin heroes
- Yama and Yami - God and Goddess of death.
- Kripa and Kripi - Figures from the Mahabharata.
- Lava and Kusha - Sons of Rama and Sita.
- Nakula and Sahadeva - Sons of Pandu, and the last born of the Pandavas
- Lakshmana and Shatrughna - Sons of Dasharatha and Sumitra
- Indra and Agni - Mirror twins
- Nala and Nila - Mythical figures from the Ramayana

=== Shintoism ===
- Izanagi and Izanami - God and Goddess, creators of the Japanese islands.
- Fūjin and Raijin - Twin brothers, gods of the wind and lightning/thunder, respectively.

=== Jewish ===
- Jacob and Esau - Sons of Isaac and Rebecca. Represented two nations.
- Pharez and Zerah - Sons of Judah and Tamar.

=== Christian ===
- Cosmas and Damian - Early Christian Arab martyrs. Patron saints of twins.
- Crispin and Crispinian - 3rd-century Christian saints.
- Florus and Laurus - Byzantine Christian martyrs of the 2nd century.
- Gervasius and Protasius - 2nd-century Christian martyrs from Milan.
- Thomas the apostle and his unnamed twin brother.

=== Zoroastrian ===
- Ahura Mazda and Ahriman - Twins of opposing forces: good and evil.

=== Ossetian mythology ===
- Akhshar and Akhsartag - one of the main characters and progenitors of the Nart saga

=== Afro-Caribbean cosmologies ===
- Marassa Jumeaux - The divine, children twins in Vodou.
- Ibeji - Twins of joy and happiness. Children of Shango or Sango and Oshun.

=== Chinese mythology ===
- Fuxi and Nüwa - God and Goddess, ancestors of Humanity in Chinese mythology.

== See also ==
- Divine twins
- Dualistic cosmology
- Killing of twins in Nigeria

== Selected literature ==
- Jobes, Gertrude (1962). Dictionary of Mythology, Part 2. New York: Scarecrow Press, Inc. pp. 1614–1615.
- Maria Leach, ed. (1972). Standard Dictionary of Folklore, Mythology, and Legend. New York: Funk & Wagnalls. pp. 1134–1136.
- John M. Wickersham, ed. (2000). Myths and Legends of the World, vol 4. New York: Macmillan Reference USA. pp. 76–79. ISBN 978-0-02-865438-6.
- "Ahura Mazda (Ohrmazd) and Ahriman." New Catholic Encyclopedia. . Encyclopedia.com.12 Dec. 2018 <https://www.encyclopedia.com>.
- "ISIS." Egyptian Mythology for Smart People, egyptianmythology.org/gods-and-goddesses/isis/.
- Lewin, Vivienne. Twin Enigma. Karnac Books, 2017.
- Myers, Bethany. "Southern Illinois University Carbondale OpenSIUC." Southern Illinois University Carbondale OpenSIUC, 2002, opensiuc.lib.siu.edu/cgi/viewcontent.cgi?referer=https://www.google.com/&httpsredir=1&article=1005&context=uhp_theses.
- Voth, Grant, et al., directors. The Beauty of African Mythology. Welcome to Virginia Commonwealth University | Kanopy, 2015, vcu.kanopy.com/s?query=african+mythology.
