= Donbettyr =

Water deity in Ossetian mythology

Equivalents
- Hindu: Danu
- Indo-European: Deh₂nu
- Celtic: Danu

Donbettyr (Ossetian: Донбеттыр) is the god of all waters, and the protector of fish and fishermen in Ossetian mythology. He is related to a Scythian deity of the same name. His name is possibly derived from don, meaning 'river', derived from danu, meaning 'to flow', as a prefix for the name Peter ("Bettyr"), possibly in reference to Saint Peter. He is the Ossetian equivalent of the Greek Poseidon.

== Relations ==
His beautiful daughters are the Ossetian equivalent of sea nymphs. Through them, he is the ancestor of many of the heroes of the epic Nart saga of the north Caucasus, including Uryzmaeg, Satanaya, Xaemyts, and Batraz.

Donbettyr's golden-haired daughter Dzerassae was the mother of Uryzmaeg, Satanaya, and Xaemyts.

Donbettyr is also the maternal grandfather of the Nart hero Batraz, through the marriage of the hunter Xaemyts to an unnamed daughter of Donbettyr. In the story of their marriage, Xaemyts is chasing a white rabbit and shooting at it. It dies, but returns to life three times, before escaping to the coast where it dives into the sea. Donbettyr rises from the water and declares that the hare was actually his daughter and that Xaemyts must marry her. Xaemyts agrees, only to be told that his wife will appear on earth during the day in the form of a tortoise. Only at night will she take the form of the beautiful woman he married.

When Uryzmaeg had a son, Donbettyr took it upon himself to raise the boy, deep beneath the sea. While sometimes this boy is nameless, in some versions he is the Caucasian culture hero Amirani. Generally raised on land, in this Ossetic variation, Amirani is thrown into the sea and raised by Donbettyr and his daughters, eventually rising from the sea on the back of a bull.
