= Batraz =

Character in the Nart sagas

- Parents: Haemyts

Batraz, Batradz, Batyradz, or Pataraz (Ossetian: Батырадз Batyraʒ) is a central character in the North Caucasian myths known as the Nart sagas. The Narts were the central figures of the folklore of peoples of the North Caucasus.

== Myth ==
Batraz in the Ossetian Nart sagas is son of Khami(t)s (Хæмыц, Xæmyc). Khamis was married to a sea-nymph or water-sprite, in Ossetian variants a daughter (named sometimes as Bisenon of the Bisenta clan) of the Ossetian sea-god Donbettyr and in Circassian versions the frog-like Lady Isp. Whilst at a meeting of the Narts (see ru:Ныхас) the Nart Syrdon (see ru:Сырдон) ridiculed Khamis's wife, who had taken the form of a frog which he put in his pocket. As a result, Khamis's wife left, but before going she breathed (spat?) the embryo of her son upon her husband's back, creating a type of womb-like cyst from which Batraz is later delivered, glowing hot.

After being born from his father's back, still on fire, Syrdon throws Batraz into the sea, where he dwells during his childhood. Batraz gained his powers by visiting the god-blacksmith Kurdalægon (Куырдалæгон) – the smith heats Batraz to white heat, then using tongs, throws him into the sea. From then on Batraz's great feats begin – he lives in the sky and is able to summon lightning bolts to aid the Narts. In one variant Batraz demands a huge amount of charcoal from the Narts, then with two dozen bellows the charcoal is heated, and Batraz is heated to white hot, he then jumps into the sea, and next kills many Narts. In a variant of this mythic motif Batraz becomes so hot - in order to avenge his father's death at the hands of certain other Narts - that he plunges, burning, through successive floors of a tower into a cauldron placed beneath it by Syrdon, and then goes on to kill the guilty Narts in revenge.

His feats include wreaking vengeance on a 'Crooked giant' (Сохъхъыр уæйыг) in retribution for violence against the young people of the Narts; and also upon Sainag-Aldar ("the owner of the black mountain", see ru:Сайнаг-Алдар), the killer of his father Xamyc.

Batraz also appears in tales in which the Narts compete for a prize by boasting – often he is the winner in the boasting games.

Ultimately it is vengeance for his father that leads to his death - his father had a magic tooth than when shown allowed him to sleep with any woman of the Narts - his (mis-)use of this led to Xamyc being killed in an ambush by other Narts who sought revenge for this. However Batraz takes revenge, and he starts killing and persecuting other Narts in cruel ways, then he begins to blame the heavenly spirits for his father's death. Eventually god has to intervene and put Batraz to death.

=== Batraz's sword ===
One aspect of Batraz's aspect is his representation of iron. Often is the tales his physical presence itself is used as a weapon, such as him smashing through the walls of a fortress. The tales where his hot self is plunged into water have been taken as a reference to the quenching of steel to make it harder.

In other aspects of his myth it is his sword that creates lightning, produced when it is swung to dispel evil spirits. In one version of the legend Batraz could only die when his sword was thrown into the Black Sea.

=== Ossetian aspects ===
Most of the stories of Batraz were collected in Ossetia.

According to legend the three main sanctuaries (shrines) of Ossetia - Rekom (Реком), Tarandželoz (Таранджелоз) and Mykalgabyrtæ (Мыкалгабыртæ) - were formed by the three tears wept by God upon the death of Batraz.

Additionally the Ossetians associated Batraz's name with thunderstorms in some local folklore. However, since Christianization, as a storm god he contends with the Christian figures of 'St. Wacilla'.

== Etymology ==
Russian linguist and historian Nikolai Trubetzkoy proposed that the name Batraz was borrowed into Ossetic via a Kabardian source, as the phonology is impossible for a native Ossetic name. Trubetsky proposed that the name was borrowed by the Kabardians from an earlier, non-Ossetic, Iranian people who once lived in the region, and reconstructs the Old Iranian form as *Pitari-za, meaning "given birth to by the father" (a reference to the legend of Batraz's birth, in which he was born from a hump on his father Xamyc's back).

The Ossetic term Батыр may be cognate with the Persian word Bahador (Persian: بهادر), the first syllable is very likely derived from the Iranic word *bag meaning "Hero, Lord", the whole name meaning "hero Az" – interestingly enough, "Az" is also the root for the Georgian exonym "Osi" or "Oseti" (from Old Ossetic Azi, from earlier Iasi) the second half being ultimately derived from the Proto-Iranian *Yazig, from which the Iazyges and subsequently the Ossetians receive their name.

== Comparative mythology ==
As a 'god' who contends against the other gods Batraz takes a similar role as the Armenian Artavazd (son of Artashes), and the Georgian Amirani. He has also been identified as corresponding to Prometheus in Greek mythology.

Dumézil also sees parallels between Batraz's unusual birth, and the Indian deity Indra.

He is sometimes seen as a possible precursor to King Arthur.
