= Edouard Taitbout de Marigny =

French academic and polymath

Chevalier Jacques-Victor-Édouard Taitbout de Marigny
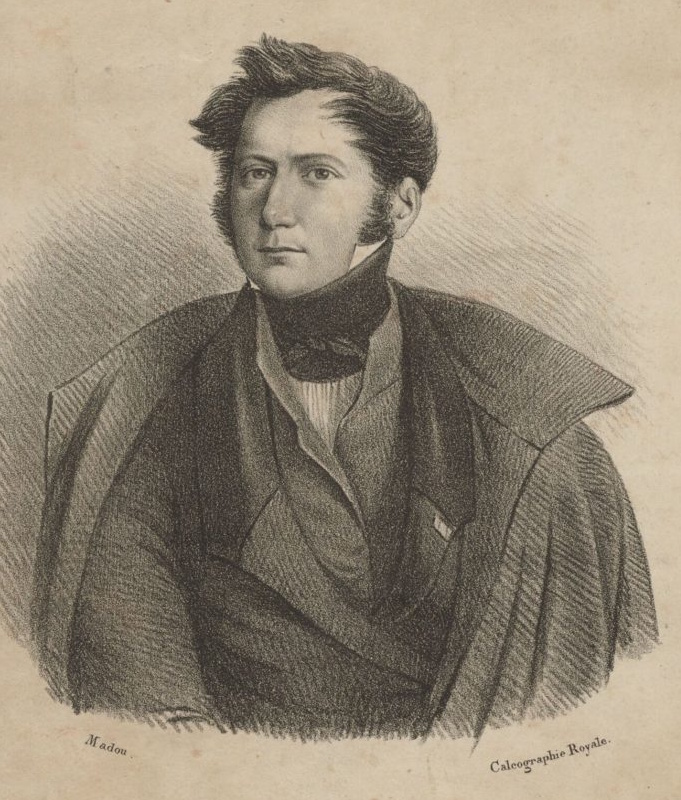
- Born: 28 March 1793; Koroni
- Died: 11 April 1852 (aged 59); Odessa, Russian Empire
- Citizenship: France; Netherlands
- Occupations: Diplomat, traveler, geographer, archaeologist, art collector, painter
- Organizations: French Geographic Society
- Known for: Travel memoirs in Circassia; Held various high-level posts for the Dutch government

Edouard Taitbout de Marigny (French: Chevalier Jacques-Victor-Édouard Taitbout de Marigny; Adyghe: Джак Виктор Iэдуард Титбу де Марини) was a French diplomat, traveler, geographer, archaeologist, art collector, and painter. Fluent in French, Greek, Latin, Dutch, German, Russian, and Turkish, de Marigny also knew some Adyghe and Ancient Greek. He compiled a Circassian-French dictionary.

Having held many posts, de Marigny served as the vice-consul of the Netherlands in Feodosia from the 1820s, then as consul in Odessa in 1830, and as consul general of the Netherlands for the Black Sea and Azov ports in 1848.

In the 1840s, as the captain of the ship Yulia, de Marigny repeatedly traveled the coasts of the Sea of Azov, the Black Sea, and the Mediterranean in 1821, 1823–1825, and 1829–1851. He studied the history, lifestyle, and culture of the coastal peoples, primarily the Circassians.

== Biography ==
=== Early life ===
He was born on 28 March 1793 into an old French aristocratic family. He learned many languages, including French, Greek, Latin, Dutch, German, Russian, and Turkish.

=== Travels in Circassia ===
He arrived in Anapa in 1813 and made a trip to the coast of Circassia in 1818. During this trip, he met the Natukhai and Shapsug tribes on the Black Sea coast. Raffaello Scassi assisted him in his travels. Noting that the Circassians respected the French due to Napoleon's victories against Russia, de Marigny stated that he was warmly welcomed in Circassia for this reason. At the end of April 1818, de Marigny, together with Scassi, sailed from Alushta to Gelendzhik on a specially built light ship, the Circassia. His ship remained there until 16 May and then returned to Crimea at the end of May. A month later, de Marigny repeated this journey. During his travels, de Marigny met and became friends with Circassian notables.

Hoping that the Russo-Circassian War would end with the Circassians and Russians agreeing to live together in peace, de Marigny also assisted the Circassians in commercial matters.

In 1821, de Marigny became the Dutch vice-consul for the Black Sea ports; he visited Circassia several more times during his visits to the Black Sea coast under the instructions of the Dutch government in 1823–1824.

De Marigny's travel diaries are considered a primary source and contain various materials on the ethnography of the Black Sea Circassians. Although de Marigny traveled primarily for commercial and political purposes, he conducted research not only on the economic and socio-political system of the Circassians but also on their social and family lives, religious beliefs, and spiritual culture. He noted that the Circassians were a hospitable people who preferred peace but knew how to fight when necessary, mostly Muslim but also respectful of the Christian religion.

=== Consul in Odessa ===
In 1830, he became the Dutch consul in Odessa and remained there for the rest of his life. De Marigny was an active member of the Odessa Society of History and Antiquities and a member of its publication committee. De Marigny first described his travels in Circassia in a book published in French in 1821.

== Works ==
- Voyages faits sur la côte de Circassie en 1818 (Chevalier Taitbout de Marigny's Travelogue of Circassia)
