= Sosruko =

Character in the Nart sagas of the Caucasus

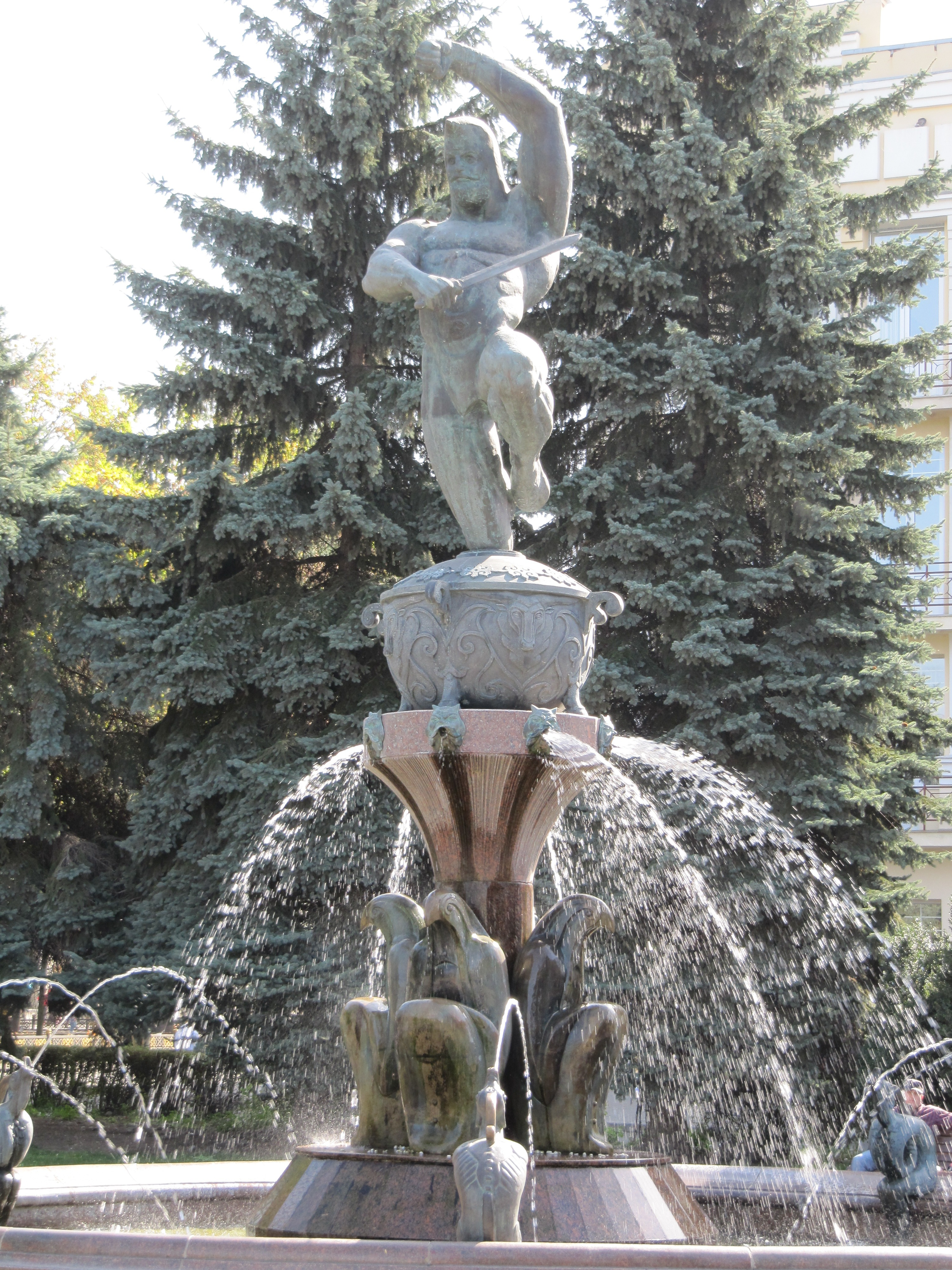
Dancing Soslan, Vladikavkaz

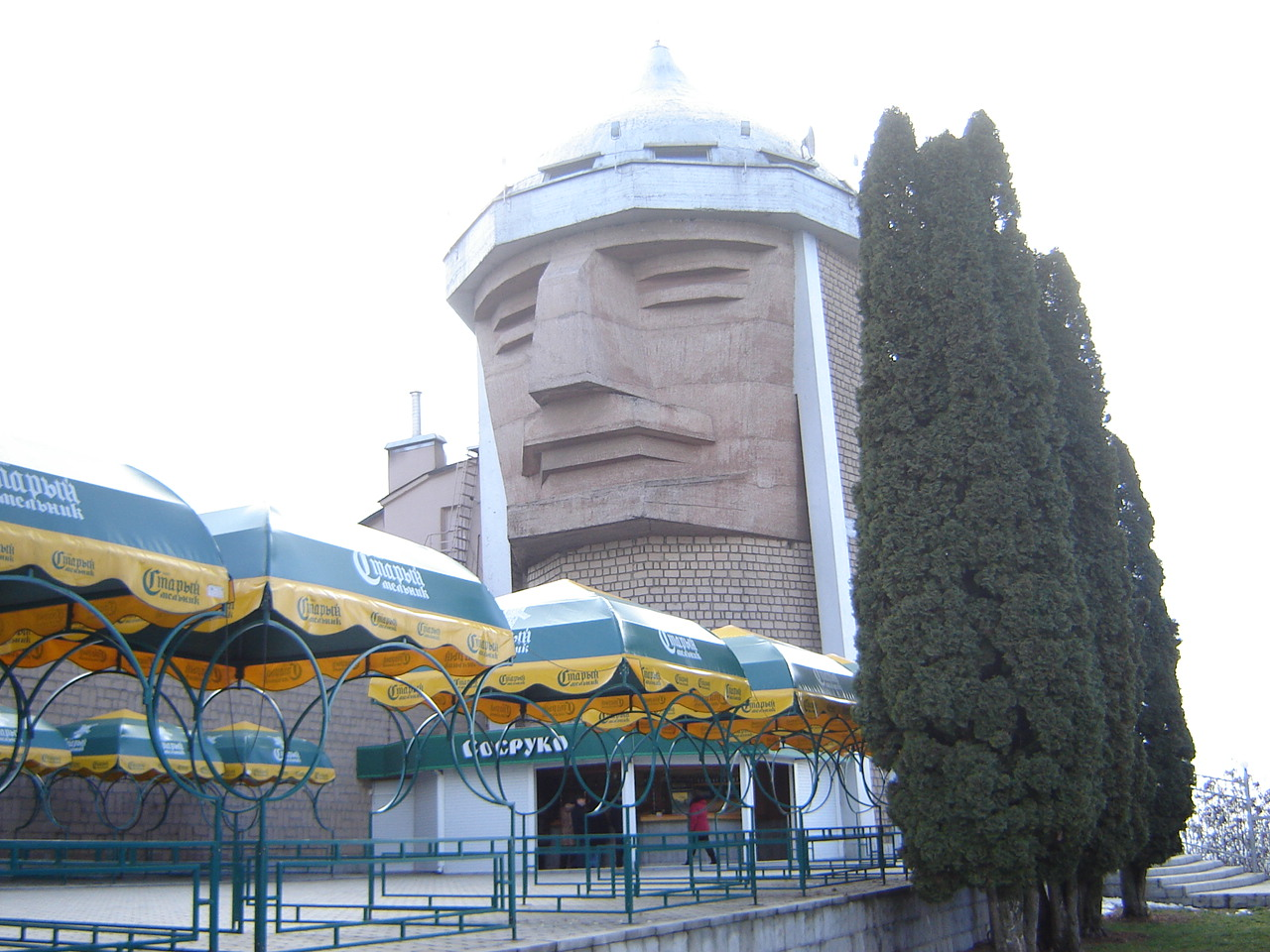
Sosruko tower in Nalchik

Sosruko, Sosruquo, or Sosriqwa, Soslan (Adyghe: Саусэрыкъо; Iron Ossetic: Сослан, Soslan; Kabardian: Сосрыкъуэ, Sosryqwa; Sosuruq/Sosurqa; Chechen: Сусаркъ/Сеска Солсла, Susarq̇/Seska Solsa) is a central character in many cycles of the Nart sagas of the North Caucasus.

Sosruko is a powerful but devious man who is the smallest of the Narts; as a character, he is sometimes cast in the light of the trickster god, comparable to the Scandinavian Loki (who finds a closer parallel in the Nart Syrdon, however), Georgian Amirani, or the Ancient Greek Prometheus. It is possible that at least in the latter case, Sosruku served as a direct inspiration.

In Circassian mythology, it was the Nart Sosriqwe, minion of the gods and his doting mother, Lady Satanaya, who stole fire from the giant.

== Etymology ==
One folk etymology states that Sosruko [saːwsərəqʷa] is from Circassian sa "sword" + wa "hit" + sər "heat" + qʷa "son"; hence literally “the son of the fiery sword hit”. Other variants are:

- Abkhaz: Sasərqwa,
- Adyghe: Саусэрыкъо [saːwsarəqʷa],
- Kabardian: Сосрыкъуэ [sawsərəqʷa],
- Ubykh: [sawsərəqʷa],
- Digor Iron Ossetic: Sosruqo, Sozyryqo, Sozuruqo and Sozyruko.

In Ossetian, the name Soslan etymologically came from Turkic languages: Nogai suslan- "to look menacing", suslä "menacing, gloomy" (hence Iron Ossetic: Soslan).

Another plausible etymology is that the Ossetic term "Sozyr" in the regional variant "Sozyryqo" is cognate with the Persian "Sezavar", meaning "he who is worthy", with the suffix being of exogenous origin. This would explain why in the notably conservative Digor-Ossetic dialect, the name Sosruko is preferred over the Turkic name Soslan, and why the name "Sozyr", without the suffix, is so common among Digor-Ossetian elders.
