= Kurdalægon =

Deity of blacksmiths in Ossetian mythology

Kurdalægon (Ossetian: Куырдалӕгон), also spelled and known as Kuịrdalägon, Kurd-Alägon, Aläugon, Kurd-Alä-Uärgon, is the heavenly deity of blacksmiths in Ossetian mythology. His epithet is "the heavenly one"; he shoes the dead man's horse, thus helping him on his journey to the other side. He is a close friend of the Narts.

Despite being associated with other blacksmith deities in different Indo-European mythologies (like Vulcan) he does not have the status of a god. Ossetian mythology is considered to be monotheistic, with only Xwytsau being considered God, and all the others (called zædtæ and dæwdžytæ) being considered deities of a lower class.

== Etymology ==
Ossetian Kwyrdalægon is a contraction of Kurd Alæ Wærgon, where Kurd and Alæ are epithets, meaning "blacksmith" and "Alan/Aryan", respectively, and Wærgon is the original name of Kurdalægon. The whole phrase means "Alan/Aryan Blacksmith Wærgon". Kurd originates from *kur-ta- or *kur-tar-, which is agent noun of *kur- "to heat", "to incandesce". Ossetian alæ originates from arya-, and originally meant "Aryan", and later "Alan".

The original name Wærgon is derived from Old Ossetic *wærg "wolf" (see Warg). The linguist Vasily Abaev compares it to the name of the Roman god Vulcan. But since the name in its normal form is stable and has a clear meaning—kurd ("smith") + Alaeg (the name of one of the Nartic families)+ on ("of the family")—this hypothesis has been considered unacceptable by Dumezil.

== See also ==
- Tlepsh
- Vulcan
- Kaveh the Blacksmith

== Sources ==
- Abaev, V.I. Historical-Etymological Dictionary of Ossetian language
- Talley, Jeannine Elizabeth (1978). The blacksmith: a study in technology, myth and folklore. University of California. p. 758.
