= Vasily Abaev =

Ossetian Soviet linguist (1900–2001)

- Василий Абаев (Russian); Васо Абайты (Ossetian)
- Born: 15 December 1900; Kobi, Tiflis Governorate, Russian Empire
- Died: 18 March 2001 (aged 100); Saint Petersburg, Russia
- Occupation: Linguistics
- Awards: Order of the Red Banner of Labour; Order of Merit for the Fatherland; Twice winner of the prize K. Khetagurov; Honoured Worker of Science of Georgia and North Ossetia; USSR State Prize

Academic background
- Education: Leningrad University

Academic work
- Discipline: Ossetian linguistics

Vasily "Vaso" Ivanovich Abaev (also Abayev or Abayti; Russian: Василий Иванович Абаев, Ossetian: Абайты Иваны фырт Васо, romanized: Abaity Ivany fyrt Vaso; 15 December 1900 – 18 March 2001) was a Soviet Ossetian linguist specializing in Iranian, particularly Ossetian linguistics.

== Biography ==
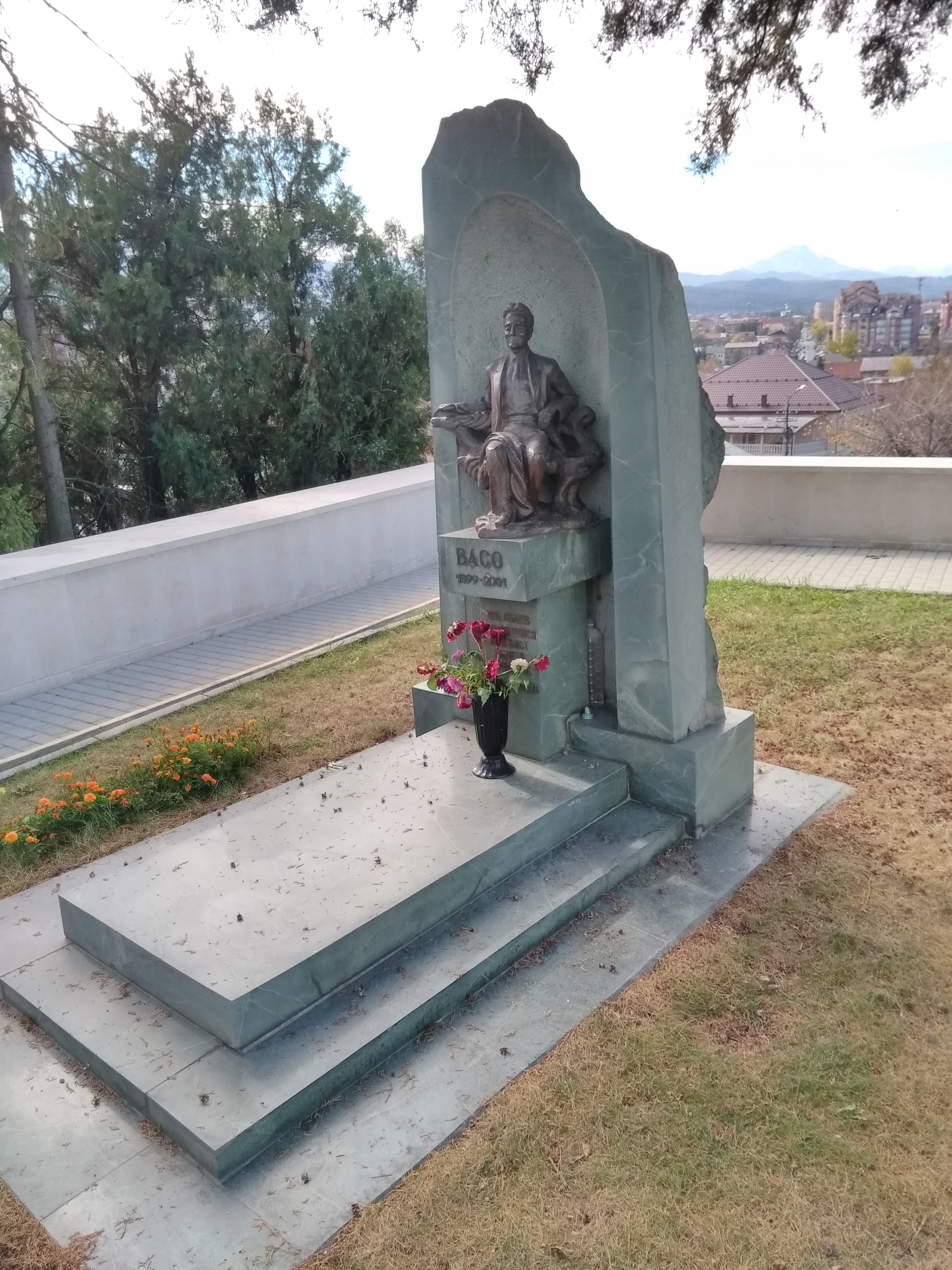
Abaev's grave in Vladikavkaz, North Ossetia

Abaev was born in the village of Kobi, Tiflis Governorate, Russian Empire.

He studied at the Gymnasium of Tiflis from 1910 to 1918 and graduated from the Leningrad University in 1925. He studied Iranian philology under Friedman's direction and, as many other young linguists, fell under the influence of the controversial Nicholas Marr, joining Marr's Yaphetic Institute in 1928. After Marr's death, he moved to broad Iranian topics and field work in Ossetia until the end of World War II. In 1945, he moved back to Leningrad where he published his work on the Nart sagas, a dictionary and grammar book of Ossetian. With Joseph Stalin's condemnation of Marr's linguistic theories the Yaphetic Institute was purged, but Abaev was spared.

Starting with the 1950s, Abayev became internationally famous as the leading authority on Scythian and Sarmatian linguistics. Assisted by his friend, Georges Dumézil, Abaev demonstrated connections between the Scythian languages and modern Ossetian. He also pointed out some striking similarities between Ossetian and Celtic mythology.

In the 1960s, he also became known as a determined opponent of structuralism, which he compared to "dehumanization" of linguistics.

His magnum opus, the Etymological Dictionary of Ossetian Language, which is based on the material of 190 languages and dialects, was published in four volumes between 1959 and 1989 and became known outside the USSR as well. He died at the age of 100 in Saint Petersburg. Several years later, a monument to him was unveiled in Tskhinvali.

== Honours and awards ==
- Order of Merit for the Fatherland, 3rd class (December 20, 2000) - for outstanding contribution to the development of national science and training of highly qualified and in connection with the 100th anniversary of the birth; 4th class (December 7, 1995) - for services to the state, the progress made in work
- Order of the Red Banner of Labour
- Twice winner of the prize K. Khetagurov
- Honoured Worker of Science of Georgia and North Ossetia
- USSR State Prize - 1981

== Bibliography ==
- Alans, Encyclopædia Iranica, V. Abaev and H. W. Bailey
- Vasilij Ivanovič Abaev, TITUS (Thesaurus Indogermanischer Text- und Sprachmaterialien)
- "Grammar of the Ossetian language", by Abaev (in Russian)
