= Uastyrdzhi =

Name of Saint George in Ossetian folklore

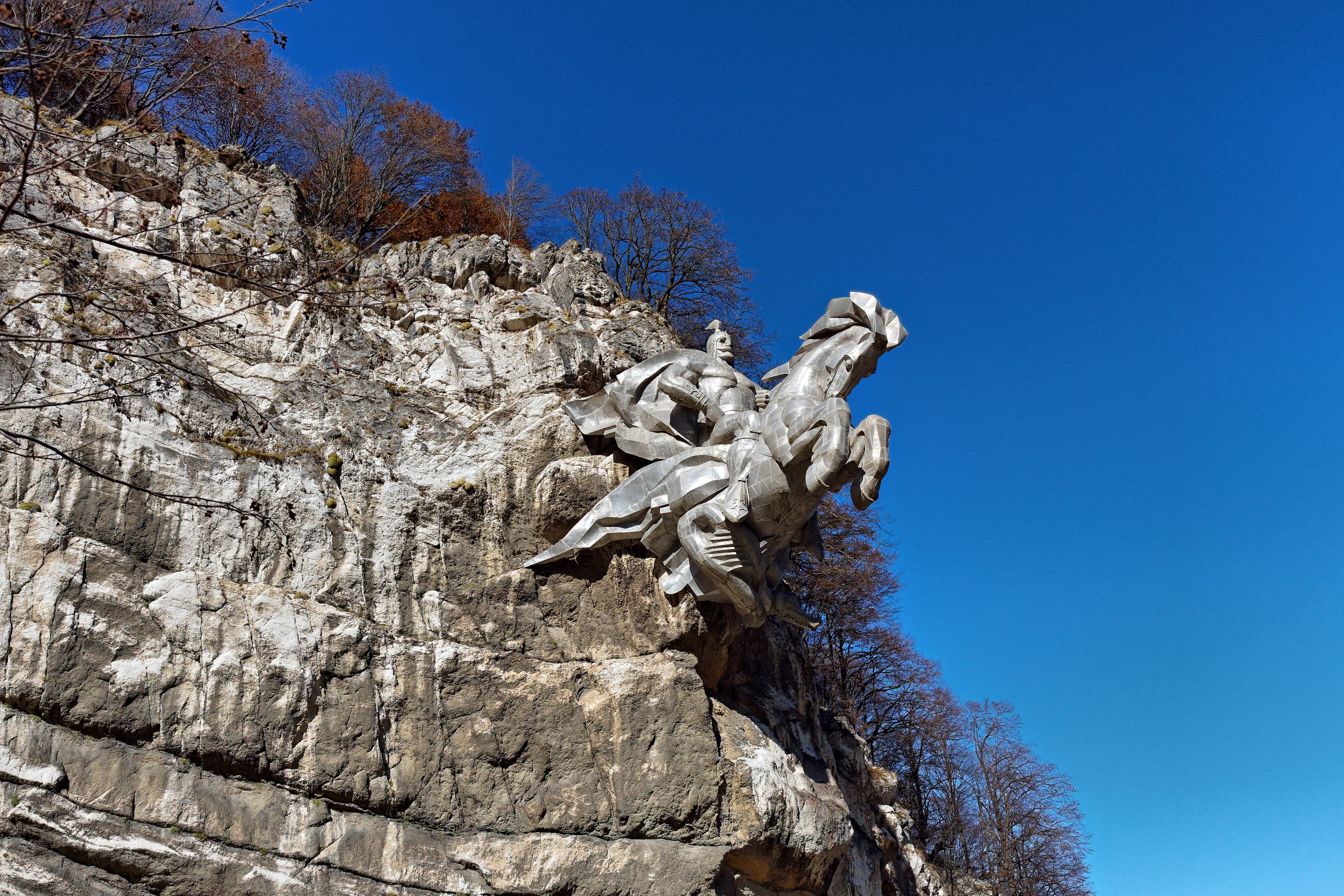
Uastyrdzhi monument in Alagir Canyon, Ossetian Military Road (2016)

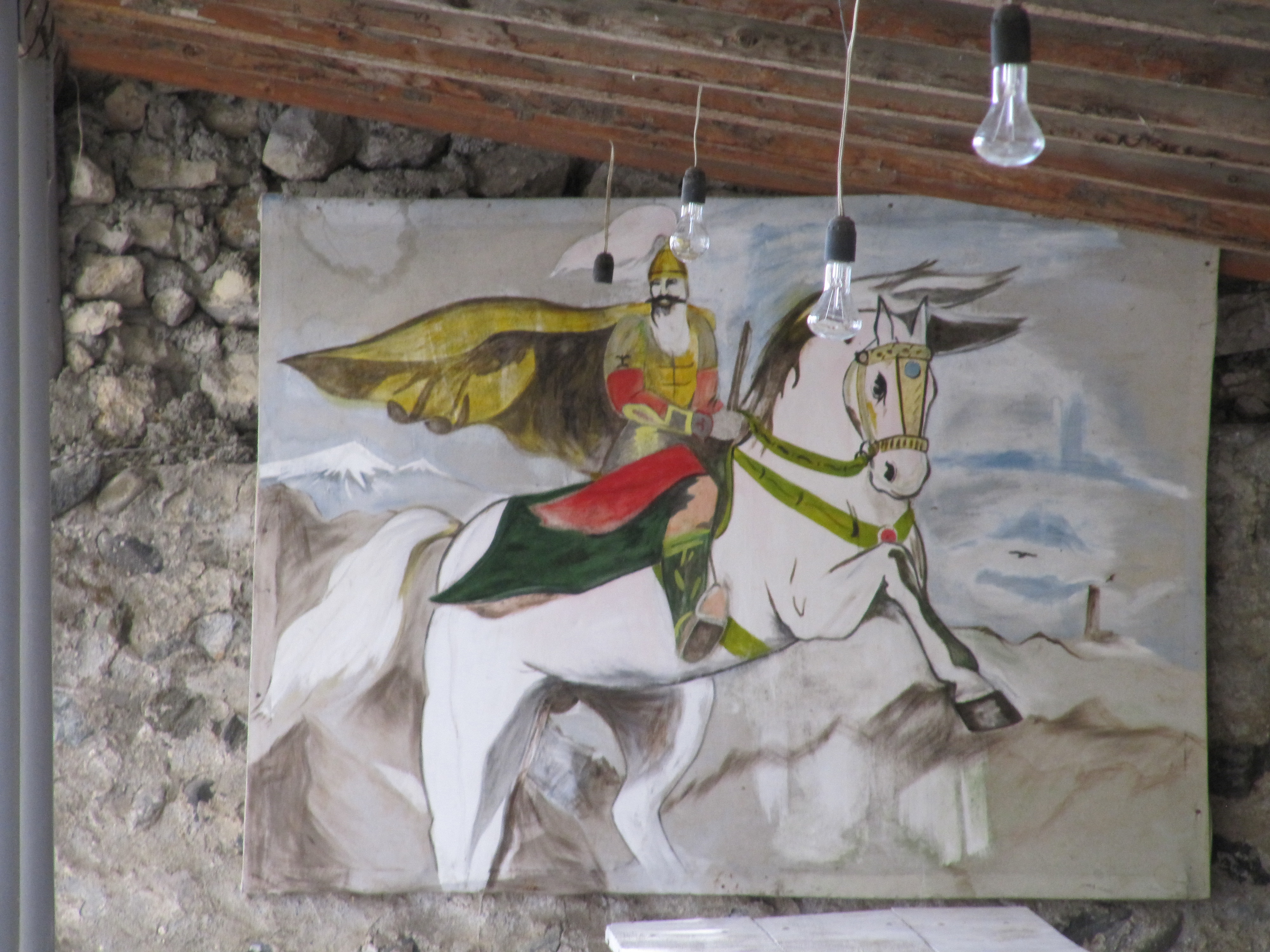
Unidentified image (2009 photograph)

Uastyrdzhi (Iron Ossetic: Уастырджи, romanized: Wastyrĝi, pronounced [ˈwɑʃtɨrd͡ʒi]) (Note: Also transliterated as Wastyrĝi, Wastyrgi, Wastyrdzhi, Wastyrdži, Wastyrji, Wastırci; Digor: Уасгерги [ˈwaskerɡi].) is the name of Saint George in Ossetian folklore. Uastyrdzhi is the patron of masculinity and travellers as well as being a guarantor of oaths, like his Iranian counterpart Mithra (among others such as Verethragna and Fereydun) with whom he shares a common origin. It is forbidden for women to pronounce his name; instead, they must refer to him as лӕгты дзуар lӕgty dzuar (literally, "the saint of men").

Uastyrdzhi is invoked in the national anthems of both North Ossetia–Alania and South Ossetia.

He is depicted as a horseman with a long beard, riding on a white horse. A large public ceremony devoted to him is held in early July at Khetag's Grove (Хетæджы къох, Khetӕdzhy k'ox), a wood situated three kilometres outside of Alagir, near Suadag village. According to legend, Khetag (Хетаг) was the son of an Alanian king who consecrated the grove to Uastyrdzhi. Another important ceremony in honour of Uastyrdzhi is held beside a shrine called Rekom in the Tsey Valley in mid-June.

Since the fall of the Soviet Union, the cult of Uastyrdzhi has enjoyed renewed popularity in Ossetian nationalism, and there have been several claims of visitations. The attitude of the local Russian Orthodox Church towards Uastyrdzhi is ambivalent.

The festival of Dzhiorguba (Джиоргуыба) is celebrated in Uastyrdzhi's honour in November (and is eponymous of the month's name in Ossetian). It involves the sacrifice of a one-year-old bull. To indicate that the victim belongs to the god, its right horn is cut off long before, forbidding any herdsman to swear on it.

== See also ==
- Tetri Giorgi
- Uatsdin
- Shatana
- Saint George and the Dragon
