= Nart saga =

Folklore of the North Caucasus

The Nart sagas (Abkhaz: Нарҭаа ражәабжьқәа, romanized: Nartaa raƶuabƶkua; Adyghe: Нарт тхыдэжъхэр, romanized: Nart txıdəĵxər; Ossetian: Нарты кадджытæ / Нарти кадæнгитæ, romanized: Narty kadĝytæ / Narti kadængitæ) are a series of tales originating from the North Caucasus. They form much of the basic mythology of the ethnic groups in the area, including Abazin, Abkhaz, Circassian, Ossetian, Karachay-Balkar, and to some extent Chechen-Ingush folklore.

== Etymology ==
The term nart comes from the Ossetian Nartæ, which is plurale tantum of nar. The derivation of the root nar is of Iranian origin, from Proto-Iranian *nar for 'hero, man', descended from Proto-Indo-European *h₂nḗr (the name of the Roman emperor Nero also derives from this same root). In Ingush and Chechen, the word nart means 'giant'.

== Characters ==
Some of the characters who feature prominently in the sagas are:

- Sosruko or Soslan (Ubykh, Abkhaz and Adyghe: sawsərəqʷa (Саусырыкъо); Ossetian: Сослан, romanized: Soslan) – a hero who sometimes also appears as a trickster
- Batraz (Ossetian: Батырадз) – the leader and greatest warrior of the Narts
- Satanaya (Ubykh: satanaja; Adyghe: Сэтэнай, romanized: Setenaj; Ossetian: Сатана, romanized: Satana) – the mother of the Narts, a fertility figure and matriarch
- Tlepsh (Adyghe and Abaza: [ɬapʃ]; Ossetian: Куырдалæгон, romanized: K^{w}yrdalægon) – a blacksmith deity
- Syrdon (Ossetian: Сырдон) – a trickster figure compared by Georges Dumezil to the Norse god Loki
- Pkharmat (Chechen: Пхьармат, romanized: Pẋarmat) – in the Nakh peoples' Vainakh epos, a blacksmith figure who steals fire from the gods for the mortals
- Akhsar and Akhsartag (Ossetian: Æхсæр, Æхсæртæг) are twin brothers who are heroes in Ossetian mythology and sons of Warhag. Akhsartag is also the father of the narts Uryzmaeg and Haemyts.
- Dzerassae (Ossetian: Дзерассæ) – daughter of the sea-god Donbettyr, and mother of many Nart heroes.
- Uryzmaeg (Ossetian: Уырызмæг, Орæзмæг, Урузмæг; Adyghe: Орзэмэдж, Озырмэс; Kabardian: Уэзырмэс, Chechen: Орзми, Ingush: Урузман, Abkhazian, Abaza: Уазырмас, Karachay-Balkar: Ёрюзмек, romanized: Örüzmek) is the hero of the Nart saga, son of Akhsartag and Dzerassae.
- Haemyts (Ossetian: Хæмыц, Adyghe: Хъымыщ, Kabardian: Хъымыщ, Chechen: Хамчи, Ingush: Хамча, Abkhaz: Хмышь, Abaza: Хъмыщ, Karachay-Balkar: Хымыч, romanized: Xımıç) is the hero of the, son of Akhsartag and Dzerassae, the father of the hero Batraz and the twin brother of Uruzmaeg, with whom they often went on conquest campaigns together.

== Study and significance ==
The first Westerner to take note of the Nart stories was the German scholar Julius von Klaproth, who traveled to the Caucasus during the first decade of the 19th century. The earliest written account of the material is attributed to the Kabardian author Shora Nogmov, who wrote in Russian in 1835–1843, published posthumously in 1861. A German translation by Adolf Berge was published in 1866 (Berge 1866). The stories exist in the form of prose tales as well as epic songs.

It is generally known that some of the Nart corpora have an ancient Iranian core, inherited from the Scythians, Sarmatians, and Alans (the latter being the ancestors of the Ossetians). However, they also contain abundant local North Caucasian accretions of great antiquity, which sometimes reflect an even more archaic past.

The Ossetes consider the Nart epic to be a central feature of their national identity. Based especially on the Ossetian versions, the Nart stories have been valued by scholars as a window towards the world of the Iranian-speaking cultures of antiquity, and as an important source for comparative Indo-European mythology. For example, the philologist Georges Dumézil used the Ossetian division of the Narts into three clans to support his Trifunctional Hypothesis that the Proto-Indo-Europeans were similarly divided into three castes—warriors, priests, and commoners.

The Northwest Caucasian (Circassian, Abkhaz-Abasin and Ubykh) versions are also highly valuable because they contain more archaic accretions and preserve "all the odd details constituting the detritus of earlier traditions and beliefs", as opposed to the Ossetian ones, which have been "reworked to form a smooth narrative."

== Connections to other mythology ==
Research shows that the core of the Nart Saga has Iranian cultural roots (Scythian, Sarmatian, Alan). A Russian comparative study, Shahnameh and the Nart Epic of the Ossetians: A Symbolic Comparison, highlights overlapping symbols and narrative structures. Comparative studies have identified similar symbolic motifs, e.g., the “winged bird” motif appears in both epics as a mythic symbol.

Some motifs in the Nart sagas are shared by Greek mythology. The story of Prometheus chained to Mount Kazbek or to Mount Elbrus in particular is similar to an element in the Nart sagas. These shared motifs are seen by some as indicative of an earlier proximity of the Caucasian peoples to the ancient Greeks, also shown in the myth of the Golden Fleece, in which Colchis is generally accepted to have been part of modern-day Georgia.

In the book From Scythia to Camelot, authors C. Scott Littleton and Linda A. Malcor speculate that many aspects of the Arthurian legends are derived from the Nart sagas. The proposed vector of transmission is the Alans, some of whom migrated into northern France at around the time the Arthurian legends were forming. As expected, these parallels are most evident in the Ossetian versions, according to researcher John Colarusso. For more details, see "Historicity of King Arthur – Lucius Artorius Castus and the Sarmatian connection".

== Differences between Nart legends ==
There are some differences between the various versions of the Nart legends. For example, the Ossetian versions depict the Nartic tribe as composed of three distinct clans that sometimes rival one another: the brave Æxsærtægkatæ (to whom the most prominent Narts belong), the rich Borætæ, and the wise Alægatæ; the Circassian versions do not depict such a division. The Abkhaz versions are unique in describing the Narts as a single nuclear family composed of Satanaya's one hundred sons. All of these versions describe the Narts as a single coherent group of (mostly) "good" heroes.

Some Nakh (Chechen-Ingush) legends include a group called the Nart-Orxustxoi, which includes the most prominent Narts known from the other versions (e.g. Seska-Solsa corresponding to Sosruko/Soslan, Khamtsha-Patarish corresponding to Batraz/Batradz, etc.) In contrast to the Ossetian and Abkhaz versions, the Nakh legends depict the Narts as warlike bandits who fight against local good heroes such as Koloi-Kant and Qinda-Shoa (with Qinda-Shoa corresponding to Sawway/Shawey).

Shayan Javadi, the Persian translator of "Nart" by matching the Ossetian, Abkhaz, Abaza, Circassian, and Ubykh versions, has been able to identify the lineage of some characters who have only been named. For instance, by recreating a character named "Qânzezâd (Abaza: Qanzhoquo)," he believes that he is the son of Azaukhan in the Ossetian version.

== See also ==
- Chechen-Ingush mythology
- Epic poetry
- Norse Saga
- Ossetian mythology
- Scythian mythology
- The Magic Pipe (film)
- Uastyrdzhi
- Kurdalægon
- Bogatyr
- Shahnameh
