= Satanaya =

Mythological figure of the North Caucasus

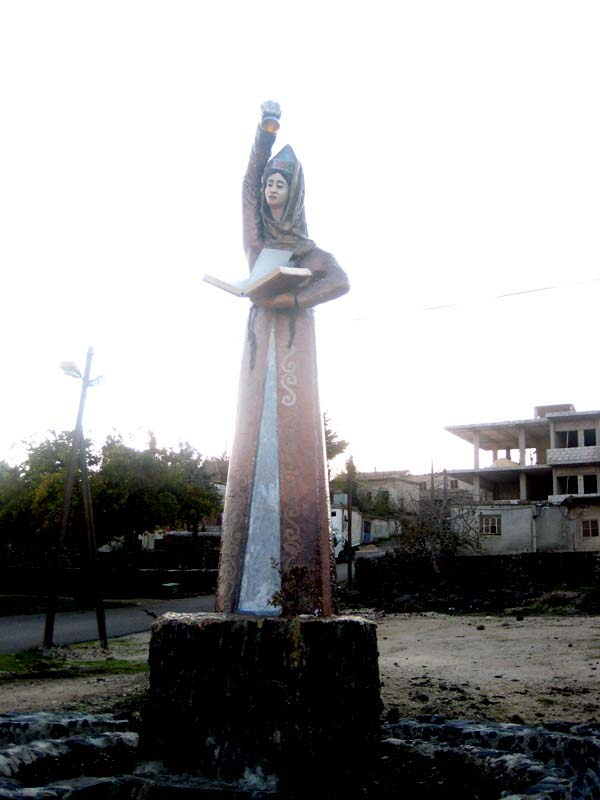
Statue of Satanaya in Beer Ajam, Syria.

Satanaya (Adyghe: Сэтэнай [satanaːj]; Kabardian: Сэтэней [satanaj]; Ubykh [satanaja]; Ossetian: Сатана Satana) is a mythological figure who appears in many cycles of the Nart sagas of the North Caucasus.

Satanaya is the mother of the Narts, a fertility figure who is also an authority over her children. Satanaya is often cast in the light of a "wise woman" or matriarch, which mirrors the relative freedom of women in North Caucasian societies generally. Satanaya can be compared to the Greek Demeter, with whom she shares many traits.

In Ossetian tradition, she is the daughter of Uastyrdzhi (St. George).

The Chechen-Ingush version is somewhat different in that the counterpart of Satanaya, Sela-Sata, is primarily a goddess of crafts and women's work rather than a Nartic matriarch. However, many of her characteristics, including the story of her miraculous birth of a dead Nart mother and her involvement in the birth of chief hero Seska-Solsa (Sosruko), correspond closely to those of Satanaya in the other versions.

== Etymology ==
A nickname derived from Alanian-Armenian queen Satenik, the name of Vainakh deity Sata, or a syncretic mix of both.

== Episodes of the Nart Saga including Satanaya ==
In "Why the Sun Pauses at the Horizon at Sunset", Satanaya makes a bet that she can weave a coat in one day, and has to ask the sun for a favour, to slow down, that she may finish her task before the day is through.

In "Lady Satanaya's Blossom", Satanaya finds a beautiful flower by the river Kuban and plucks it and replants it in front of her house. The next day, she is sad to discover that it has withered. Once again she goes and plucks another of the same flower, only to see the same result the following morning. The third time she re-plants a flower in front of her house, it rains, and the flower is invigorated and continues to live on until the next day. Satanaya realizes the importance of water to life.

== See also ==
- Tabiti, queen of the Scythian gods.
- Satenik, Alan princess according to Armenian traditional narrative.
