= Fælværa =

Ossetian mythical figure

Fælværa or Falvara (Ossetian: Фæлвæра, from the Greek: Φλώρος και Λαύρος - "Saints Florus and Laurus") in Ossetian mythology is the protector of sheep and cattle. He is identified with the deity of hunting Æfsati and has a rivalry with the deity of wolves, Tutyr.

One of the earliest references to Fælværa is contained in an article by an anonymous author published in the newspaper "Terskiye Vedomosti" in 1870. Fælværa is called here the "god of cattle", who was represented in the form of a ram and called "Fyrydzuar" or "Fyryzaed" (Iron: Фырыдзуар; Digor: Фырызæд), i.e. "holy ram"; he is asked to increase the number of livestock and in addition, women asked him to give them children.

According to ethnographic research, a ram could serve as a ritual embodiment of Fælværa: among South Ossetians during a holiday dedicated to him in August a boiled ram's head, part of his back, part of a leg and a tail fat were placed in front of the elders, which was a symbol of the presence of the deity Fælværa at the meal.

Fælværa's good-heartedness became proverbial: when an Ossetian wanted to praise someone for their humility and meekness he would say: “He looks like Fælværa” - and the proverb has survived to this day.

== Etymology ==
The Russian scientist Vsevolod Miller suggested that the name Fælværa comes from the names of the saints Florus and Laurus. Vasily Abaev, Georges Dumézil and many other folklorists and ethnographers also agreed with this etymology.

== In the Nart saga ==
In one of the Ossetian tales, Fælværa distributes cattle as a sacrifice among the celestials, and in another he endows the Digorians with sheep, goats and horses.

But Fælværa was not always favorable to the Narts. When the supreme God Hytsau decided to punish the Narts he was also the conductor of his wrath among other celestials. He sent a pestilence on the cattle of the Narts from heaven.

In the Nart saga, Fælværa is presented as a celestial being participating in Nart feasts, which shows him as a friend of the Narts, who often call him the kind and generous Fælværa. He is depicted as a man without a left eye, who was knocked out by the Lord of wolves Tutyr to enable his wolves to quietly sneak up on the left to the sheep guarded by Fælværa.

The high status of Fælværa is mentioned in the legend about the courtship of Atsamaz to Agunda, the daughter of Sainag-aldar, where among the honorary matchmakers along with Safa, Æfsati and Uastyrdzhi was Fælværa, whose seat was Mount Kariu in the Kurtatin gorge of North Ossetia. At the same time, he was considered the youngest of them.

In addition, one of the daughters of the Sun is married to Fælværa's son Dzudzumar. Fælværa's attempts to seduce the mother of the Narts Satana, however, were unsuccessful: “Get out or I will beat you up with an old broom,” so she hastily kicked him out.

== See also ==
- Tutyr
- Ossetian mythology
