= Ossetian mythology =

Ossetian mythology or Alan mythology (Ossetian: Ирон мифологи, Дигорон митологи, romanized: Iron mifologi, Digoron mitologi) is the collective term for the beliefs and practices of the Ossetian people of the Caucasus region, which contains several gods and supernatural beings. The religion itself is believed to be of Scythian origin, but contains many later elements from Christianity, with Ossetian gods often being identified with Christian saints. The gods play a role in the famous stories about a race of semi-divine heroes called the Narts.

== Deities ==
- Hutsau or Xucau (Ossetian: Хуыцау, Хуцау, romanized: Xwycaw, Xucaw). The chief of the gods.
- Uastyrdzhi or Wasgergi (Ossetian: Уастырджи, Уасгерги, romanized: Wastyrdži, Wasgergi), also known as Lagtydzuar or Lagdzuar, more rarely as Uastylag. Named after Saint George, he is the patron of males and travellers, and the guarantor of oaths. Main patron of North Ossetia–Alania.
- Uacilla (Ossetian: Уацилла, Уацелла, Елиа, romanized: Wacilla, Wacella, Elia). Named after Saint Elijah, also spelled Watsilla. God of rain, thunder and lightning. As protector of the harvest he is known as Хоры Уацилла (Hory Uacilla, "Uacilla of the wheat"). Anyone struck by lightning was considered chosen by the god and, if they survived, a sheep was sacrificed in their honour. His festival was celebrated in the summer with the sacrifice of a lamb and a bull and the drinking of specially brewed beer. On that day women baked bread in silence as a mark of reverence.
- Safa (Ossetian: Сафа, romanized: Safa). God of the hearth chain. The most important domestic deity for Ossetians.
- Donbettyr (Ossetian: Донбеттыр, Донбеттæр, romanized: Donbettyr, Donbettær). Lord of the waters. He is named after Saint Peter, and is a fusion of the Ossetian don (meaning water) and Peter. He uses his chain to drag down those who unwarily go swimming too late to his realm at the bottom of the sea. He has many beautiful daughters, comparable to the Rusalki of Slavic mythology. Up to the 19th century, his day was celebrated on the Saturday following Easter by young girls.
- Dzerassae (Ossetian: Дзерассæ, romanized: Dzerassæ), one of Donbettyr's daughters, the mother of many Nart heroes.
- Tutyr (Ossetian: Тутыр, Тотур, romanized: Tutyr, Totur). Named after Saint Theodore of Tyre. Lord of the wolves.
- Fælværa (Ossetian: Фæлвæра, romanized: Fælværa). Possibly named after Florus and Laurus. Fælværa was the protector of sheep and his festival was celebrated before sheep-shearing in September. He only has one eye. He is often the enemy of Tutyr.
- Æfsati (Ossetian: Æфсати, romanized: Æfsati). Possibly named after Saint Eustace, he is a male hunting god.
- Kurdalægon (Ossetian: Куырдалæгон, Курдалæгон, romanized: Kwyrdalægon, Kurdalægon). The heavenly smith. A close friend of the Narts.
- Satana (Сатана). Mother goddess, mother of the Narts.
- Saubarag (Ossetian: Саубарæг or Сау бæрæджы дзуар, Сау бæрæги дзиуарæ, romanized: Sawbaræg or Saw barædžy dzwar, Saw bærægi dziwaræ, lit. '"black rider"'), the god of darkness and thieves.
- Huyændon Ældar (Хуыæндон Æлдар). Lord of the fish. A great magician and a spirit who behaves like an earthly chief ("ældar"). His name means "lord of the strait" according to Abaev; this is most probably the Cimmerian Bosphorus, the modern Strait of Kerch.
- Barastyr (Ossetian: Барастыр, Барастæр, romanized: Barastyr, Barastær) Ossetian psychopomp. The ruler of the underworld who assigns arriving dead souls to either paradise or his own realm.
- Aminon (Ossetian: Аминон, romanized: Aminon). Gatekeeper of the underworld.
- Alardy or Alaurdi (Ossetian: Аларды, Алаурди, romanized: Alardy, Alawrdi). Lord of smallpox, who had to be placated.

The uac- prefix in Uastyrdzhi and Uacilla has no synchronic meaning in Ossetic, and is usually understood to mean "saint" (also applied to Tutyr, Uac Tutyr, perhaps Saint Theodore, and to Saint Nicholas, Uac Nikkola). The synchronic term for "saint", however, is syhdaeg (cognate to Avestan Yazata). Gershevitch (1955) connects uac with a word for "word" (Sanskrit vāc, cf. Latin vox), in the sense of Logos.

== Dream journey to the land of the dead ==
Among them there are also some old men and women who, on the eve of Saint Sylvester, fall into a sort of ecstasy, remaining motionless on the ground as though asleep. When they awaken, they say they've seen the souls of the dead, sometimes in a great swamp, alternatively, astride pigs, dogs or rams. If they see a soul gathering wheat in the fields and bringing it to the village, they detect the omen of an abundant harvest.
Julius Klaproth 1823

Kurys (Digor Burku) is a dream land, a meadow belonging to the dead, which can be visited by certain individuals (the shaman-like Kurysdzauta/Burkudzauta) in their sleep. Visitors may bring back miraculous seeds of luck and good fortune, sometimes pursued by the dead. Inexperienced souls may bring back fever and sickness instead. Gershevitch (with V.I. Abaev) compares the name Kurys to the mountain Kaoiris in Yasht 19.6 (Avestan *Karwisa), which might indicate that the name is a spurious remnant of origin legends of Airyanem Vaejah of the Alans.

== Folklore ==
Ossetian folklore also includes several mythological figures, including those in the Nart sagas, such as the warrior heroes Batraz, Akhshar and Akhsartag.

== See also ==
- Nart saga
- Ætsæg Din
- Scythian mythology
