= Uacilla =

Hero of Nart saga

Hory-Uacilla (Ossetian: Уацилла, Wacilla; Digorian: Елиа, "Elijah") or Uacilla, Wacilla for short, is the name of Saint Elijah in Ossetian folklore.

It is also the name of an agricultural holiday celebrated on the Monday of the third week after Pentecost.

In Ossetian mythology Uacilla is the thunderer and lord of storms, the patron of agriculture and harvest. Several sanctuaries were dedicated to him, among which the most famous Tbau-Uacilla is located on mount Tbau in the Dargavs Gorge.

Among the Ossetians, it is believed that Uacilla protected the fields from hail and showers, disposed of rain clouds and contributed to the growth of cereals and herbs. He was approached during a drought or prolonged bad weather. For this, rams and bulls were slaughtered in his honor and a public prayer was held. In folk songs, Uacilla was portrayed as a plowman, performing the functions of a plow in one case and a sower in another.

As Georges Dumézil wrote, Ossetians having become Christians began to call St. Elijah "Uacilla". Like the Russians, they think that Uacilla is walking through the sky and fighting evil spirits. When a person is struck by lightning, they believe that Uacilla fired his "fat" (arrow or cannonball) at him.

== Celebration ==
Despite the general basis, the celebration of Uacilla in some areas had its own local characteristics. In South Ossetia the holiday was widely celebrated in the village of Edisa. The celebration in this village lasted for a whole week. Here the saint was also called Tbau-Uatsilla, which is obviously due to the fact that people from the Dargavs Gorge settled in this place, who brought with them the name used at their former place of residence.

The celebration was accompanied by sacrifices, community and family feasts. At the end of the repast, which was held separately in each family, the older men took the skin of the sacrificial goat (in which the head and legs were left) and carried it into the forest and hung it on the first tree they encountered.

In the first half of the 19th century the researcher of Ossetian traditions A. Yanovsky reported that on this holiday "Ossetians slaughter goats, remove the skin without cutting off the head and hang it on a high pole in honor of the prophet Elijah, asking him to send rain."

== See also ==
- Ossetian mythology
- List of thunder gods
- Uastyrdzhi
- Satana

== Sources ==
- Dumézil, Georges (2001). Ossetian saga and mythology. Vladikavkaz: Science. p. 66.
- Meletinsky, Yeleazar (1990). Mythological Dictionary. Soviet Encyclopedia. p. 672.
