= Assianism =

Modern pagan religion in Ossetia

Assianism
- Уацдин
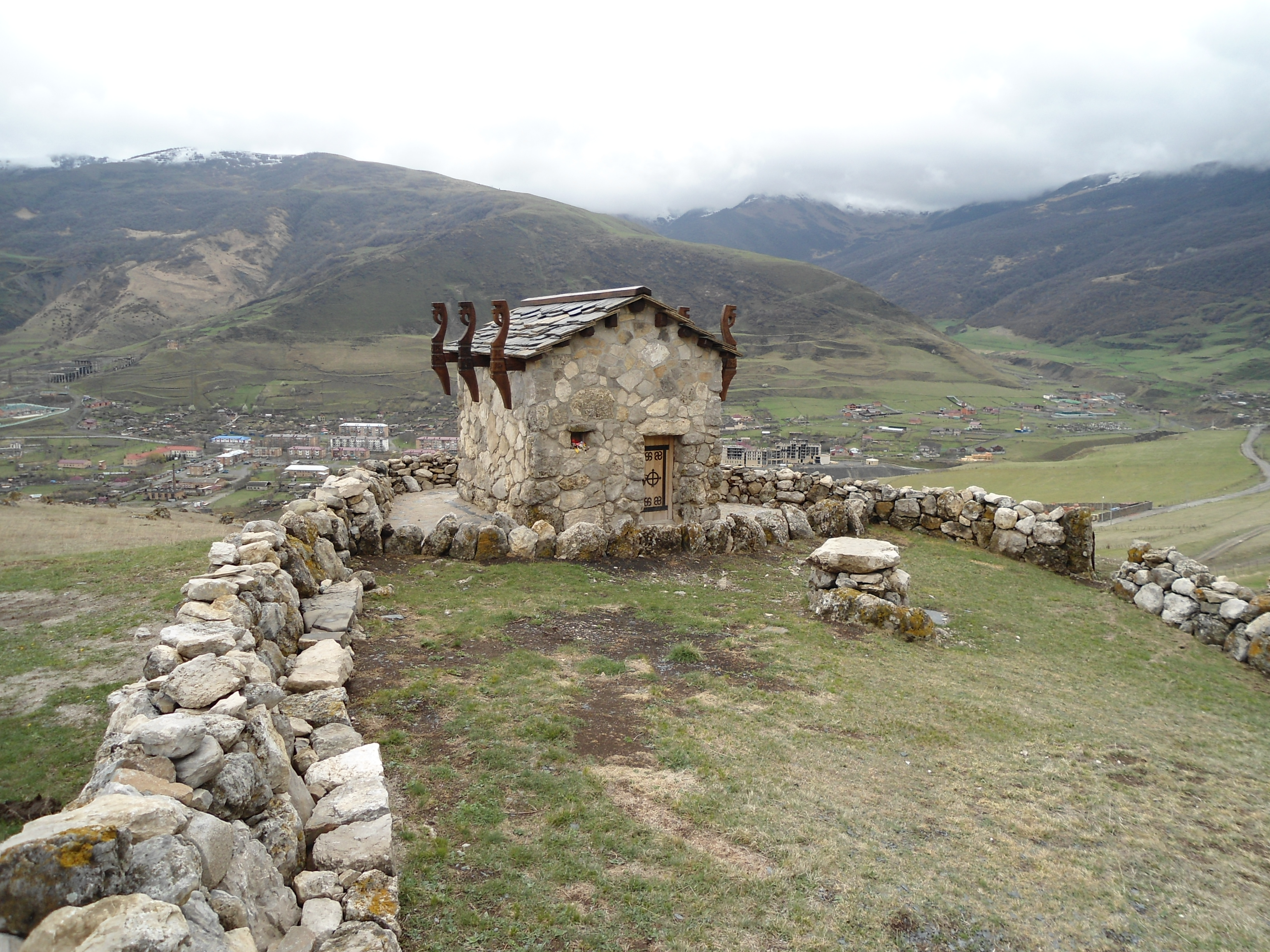
- Tkhost Temple, dedicated to Uastyrdzhi, in the Kurtat Gorge, Vladikavkaz, North Ossetia–Alania
- Type: Ethnic religion
- Classification: Iranian, Caucasian neopagan
- Scripture: Nart saga
- Theology: Polytheistic

Assianism (Iron Ossetic: Уацдин, romanized: Wacdin), (Note: The religion is known as "Assianism" among its Russian-speaking adherents ("Assianism" means the religion of the "As" or "Oss"—an ancient name of the Alans, from which the Greeks possibly drew the name of "Asia", which is preserved in the Russian and Georgian-derived name "Ossetians"), and as Uatsdin (Уацдин), Ætsæg Din (Æцæг Дин; both meaning "True Faith"), Æss Din (Æсс Дин, Ossetian-language rendering of "Assianism"), or simply Iron Din (Ирон Дин, "Ossetian Faith") by Ossetians in their own language.) sometimes called Uatsdin, is a polytheistic, ethnic and folk religion derived from the traditional narratives of the Ossetians, modern descendants of the Alans of the Scythian tribes, believed to be a continuation of the ancient Scythian religion. It started to be properly reorganized in a conscious way during the 1980s, as an ethnic religion among the Ossetians.

The religion has been incorporated by some organisations, chiefly in North Ossetia–Alania within Russia, but is also present in South Ossetia, and in Ukraine. The Nart sagas are central to the religion, and exponents of the movement have drawn theological exegeses from them.

== Etymology and definition ==
A symbol of Assianism, representing its theological trinity, called the "Three Tears of God". The symbol was first "perceived" and drawn by Slava Dzhanaïty, an architect and painter who also undertook the restoration of the Rekom Temple (an important Ossetian shrine) after an accidental fire destroyed it in 1995.

The revival of Ossetian folk religion as an organised religious movement was initially accorded the formal name Ætsæg Din (Æцæг Дин, "True Faith") in the 1980s by a group of nationalist intellectuals who in the early 1990s constituted the sacerdotal Стыр Ныхас Styr Nykhas ("Great Council"). Ætsæg, meaning "truthful", is the name of the foundational kinship in the Nart sagas, while din corresponds to the Avestan daena, meaning divine "understanding" or "conscience", and today "religion". Fearing that the concept of Ætsæg Din carried implications of universal truth that might offend Christians and Muslims, the Ossetian linguist Tamerlan Kambolov coined the alternative term Uatsdin (Уацдин) in 2010, which has become the most common name for the religion in Ossetian. Daurbek Makeyev, the most known exponent of the movement, has preferred to name it Æss Din (Æсс Дин), meaning the "religion of the Æss", "As" or "Os", an alternative ancient name of the Alans, preserved in the Russian and Georgian name "Ossetians", and root from which the ancient Greeks likely drew the term "Asia". Khetag Morgoyev, the leader of the religious organisation Ætsæg Din, also uses the simple name Iron Din (Ирон Дин, "Ossetian Faith") while rejecting the name Uatsdin, in which, in his opinion, he sees no sense. In his Russian-language writings Makeyev has used the Russian variation of Æss Din, Assianstvo (Ассианство), i.e. "Assianism".

Ruslan Kurchiev, president of the Styr Nykhas in 2019, prefers to define Assianism as a "culture" rather than a "religion", claiming that what it champions are rituals and values which are encapsulated in the Ossetian tradition. Similarly, representatives of the Dzuary Lægtæ ("Holy Men"), the council of the priests of the Ossetian sanctuaries, define Assianism, by citing the folklorist and ethnographer Soslan Temirkhanov, as "a worldview ... that arouses that holy spark that raises a person, illuminates and warms his soul, makes him strive for good and light, gives him courage and strength to fearlessly fight evil and vice, inspires him to self-sacrifice for the good of others". According to them, this Ossetian worldview is "not some form of perception abstracted from material, productive activity, but on the contrary, it is interwoven and reflects all aspects of being, at the same time being the very basis of being, an ontological principle, which we can phenomenologically characterise as pantheism", a worldview characterised by "intertwining, interconnection, interdependence" which favours a natural "logical-conceptual type of thinking and discursive thinking". Khetag Morgoyev defines the religion in similar terms, while emphasising its similarity to other Indo-European traditions, and especially its "almost identicity" to Indo-Iranian traditions.

According to the scholar Richard Foltz, despite claims to antiquity, from a scholarly point of view the movement "can be comfortably analysed within the framework of new religious movements". The adherents of Assianism object to the use of the term "Paganism" to refer to their religion, such term having strong derogatory connotations in Ossetian language and being still used by Christians and Muslims to ridicule traditional Ossetian beliefs and practices.

== History ==
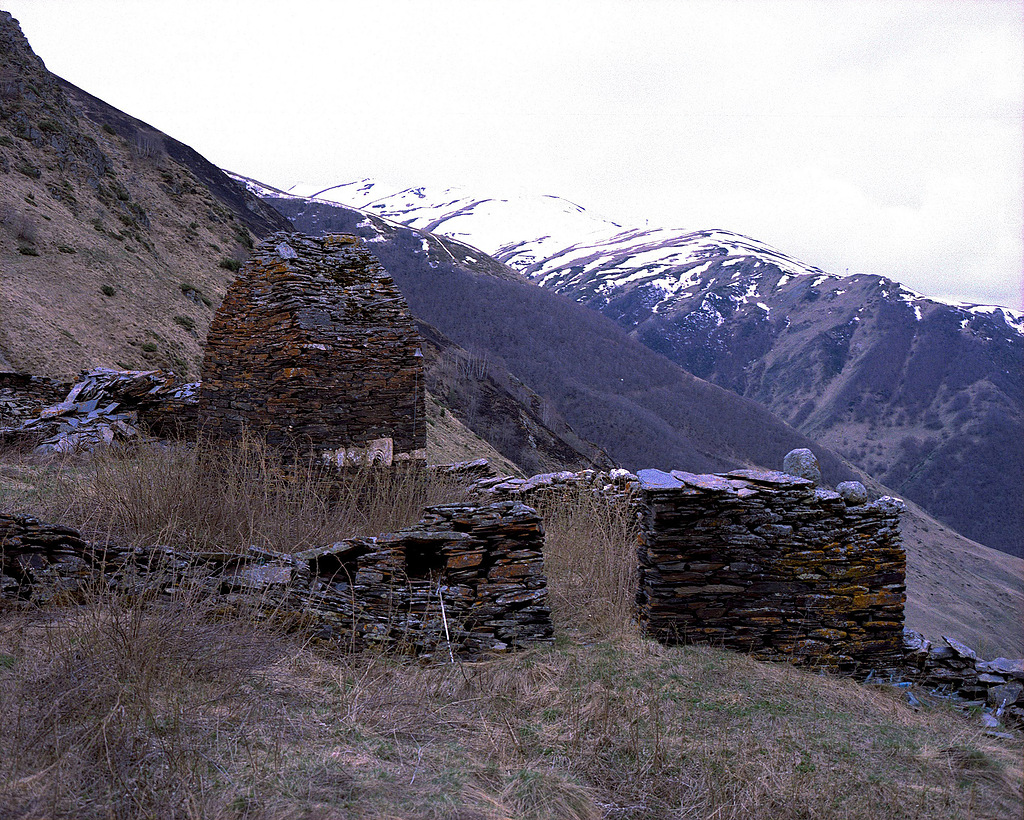
Khozy Temple in Tapankau, Alagirsky District, North Ossetia–Alania.

=== From the ancient Scythians to the modern Ossetians ===
The Scythians were a large group of Iranian (linguistically Eastern Iranian) nomadic tribes who populated the Eurasian Steppe during the first millennium BCE, from Eastern Europe to western China. Their name "Scythians" comes from Greek, Σκύθοι Skuthoi, meaning the "archers", a skill for which they were known and feared. They left a rich cultural legacy, particularly in the form of gold jewellery, frequently found in the "kurgan" burials associated with them. They practised the ancient Iranian religion.

A group of Scythian tribes, the Sarmatians, known as the Alans (i.e. "Aryans", through a common internal consonant shift, i.e. "Iranians") from the first century onwards, migrated into Europe. Allied with the Germanic Goths, the Alans penetrated west into France, Italy, Spain, and other territories under the Roman Empire. The Romans tried to manage the threat by hiring them as mercenaries in the cavalry, or, particularly in France, by buying them off as landed gentry. Many toponyms in France, such as Alainville, Alaincourt, Alençon, and others, testify that they were territorial possessions of Alan families. Alan equestrian culture formed the basis of Medieval chivalry, and in general Alan culture had a significant role—though rarely recognised—in the development of Western European culture.

While most of the Scythians assimilated into other ethnic groups by the Middle Ages, the Alans of the Caucasus maintained a distinct identity and continued to dominate the area, so that the Byzantine Empire recognised them as an independent allied kingdom. Through their relations with the Byzantines and missionaries from Georgia in the south, the Alan aristocracy adopted Eastern Orthodox Christianity during the tenth century. This, however, had little effect on the general Alan population, so that the thirteenth-century Flemish traveller William of Rubruck reported that "they knew nothing (of Christianity) apart from the name of Christ". The Ossetians are the sole modern population culturally and linguistically descending from the Alans, and they have preserved beliefs and rituals likely dating back to Scythian religion, even through waves of partial syncretisation with Christianity.

After the conquests of the Mongol Empire in the Caucasus during the mid-thirteenth century, contacts between the Alans and Eastern Orthodox religious authorities ceased completely, and their superficial Christianisation was stopped. There is evidence that between the fourteenth and the seventeenth century, shrines which were apparently built in honour of Christian saints were converted to indigenous Pagan use. The Russian Empire's expansion in the Caucasus by the end of the eighteenth century brought with itself Russian Orthodox missionaries who sought to "re-Christianise" the Ossetians. Their efforts had had limited success by the time when they were completely obliterated by the Russian Revolution of 1917, which introduced the peoples of the Caucasus into the rapid processes of industrialisation, modernisation and urbanisation of the Soviet Union.

=== Between the traditional and the new religion ===
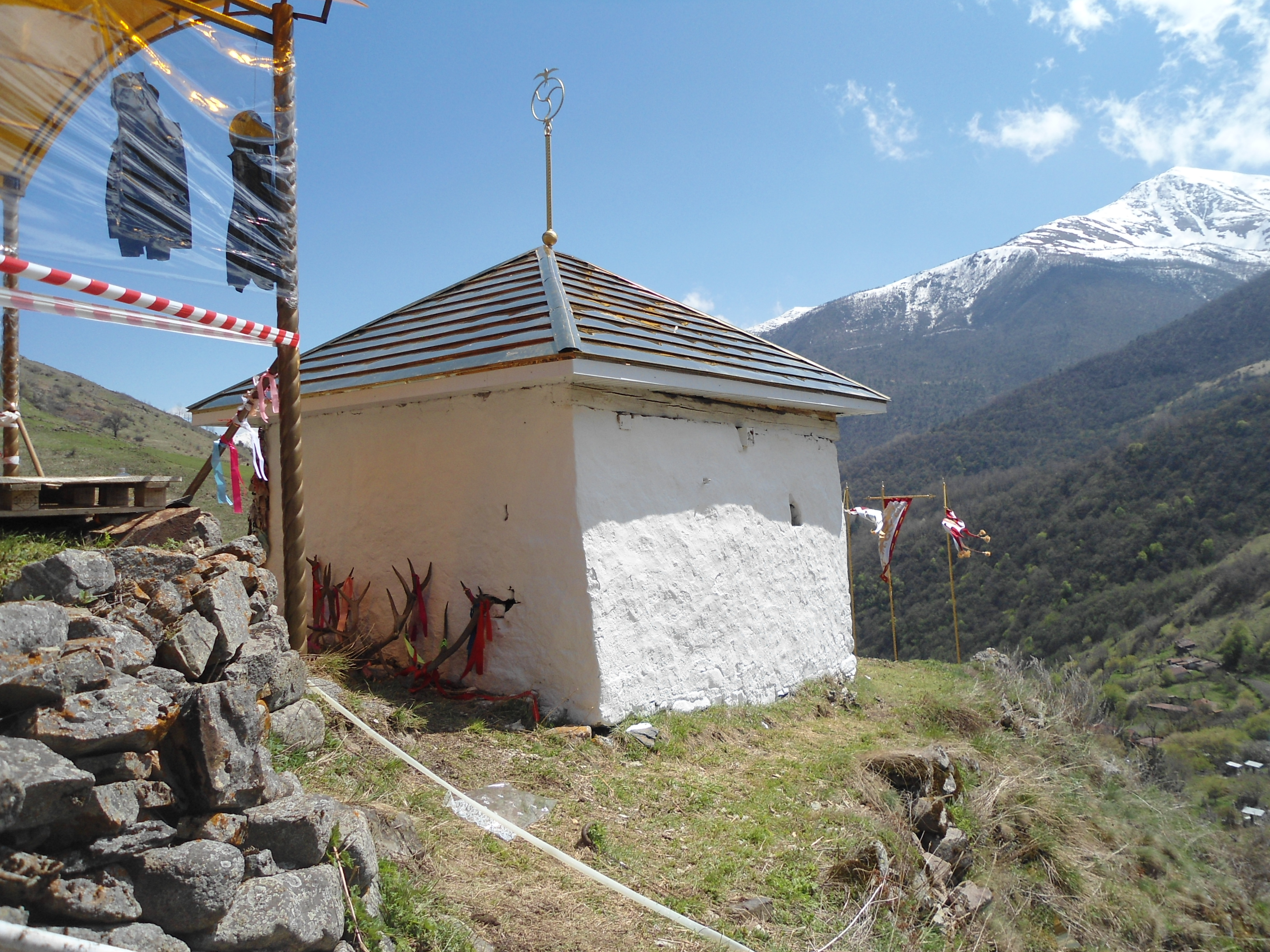
Alardi Temple in North Ossetia–Alania.

The Ossetian people are today split between two states: North Ossetia–Alania, a constituent federal republic within Russia, and the neighbouring only partially recognised state of South Ossetia. The incipient collapse of the Soviet Union in the 1980s triggered projects of identity-building among many of its constituent nations. In Ossetia, as in other nations, this involved the recovery of an "authentic national religion" harking back to pre-Christian times. Ossetian nationalism also played a role, powered by ethnic conflicts for lands and resources with neighbouring peoples in North Ossetia, and for independence in South Ossetia, a territory historically part of Georgia, whose status as an independent entity is a matter of international controversy (cf. the 2008 Russo-Georgian War).

According to Victor Shnirelman, in the Ossetian case certain traditions had survived with unbroken continuity and were revived in rural areas. This contrasts, and interacts, with an urban and more intellectual movement which elaborated a systematic revived religion associated with ethnic nationalism and with the opposition to both Russian and Georgian Orthodox Christianity, perceived as foreign, and to Islam, professed by the neighbouring Turkic and Caucasian ethnic groups and by a small minority of Ossetians. According to the scholar Sergey Shtyrkov, intellectual projects for the elaboration of an "ethnic religion" for the Ossetians date back to the early twentieth century, and it was with the Soviet atheist anti-religious "furious fight against Ossetian Paganism" in the 1950s that the idea appealed once again to Ossetian intellectuals. According to him it was Soviet anti-religious activism that drove ancient local practices from the sphere of "ethnic tradition" into the sphere of "religion" in the minds of the Ossetian people.

The scholar Richard Foltz reconstructs the development of Ossetian religion through seven phases: 1. An original Scythian Paganism; 2. a first wave of Christianisation under Byzantine and Georgian influence from the tenth to the thirteenth century; 3. a "re-Paganization" during the fourteenth and fifteenth century following the Mongol invasions and the disruption of the contacts with the Byzantines; 4. a partial re-Christianisation during the sixteenth and seventeenth century conducted by Georgian missionaries; 5. a further re-Christianisation conducted by Russian missionaries beginning in the late eighteenth century; 6. enforced state atheism during the Soviet Union from 1921 to 1991; and 7. a resurgence of "traditional Ossetian religion" since the 1980s–1990s. According to Foltz, the narrative of the contemporary promoters of Scythian Neopaganism is that the religiosity of the Ossetians maintained a strong underlying continuity while absorbing and adapting superficial influences from Christianity, and to a lesser extent from Islam and neighbouring Caucasian traditions, superficial influences which may be easily stripped away to reveal its essential, distinct "Iranian character".

Since the fall of the Soviet Union, Ossetian politicians have been outspokenly supportive of Scythian Assianism. During the 1990s, after the clashes between Ossetians and Georgians in 1991–1992, a field beside a sacred grove 30 kilometres to the west of North Ossetia–Alania's capital Vladikavkaz, where the Ossetian hero Khetag was said to have taken refuge from his enemies, was dedicated by the government as a holy site. Since 1994, sacrifices are held at the site with the participation of government officials and community leaders, with activities supervised by the sacerdotal Great Council (Styr Nykhas). The ceremony is dedicated to the most important deity, Uastyrdzhi, said to have saved Khetag from his pursuers. Government participation is also seen at the ceremonies organised at the Rekom Temple in Tsey, Alagirsky District, North Ossetia–Alania.

== Writings ==
The Nart sagas are regarded as the "holy writings" of Assianism, from which some exegetes of the movement, such as Daurbek Makeyev, have drawn theological doctrines. The scholar Richard Foltz defines the Narts a "typical Indo-European heroic epic". According to Makeyev, who according to Foltz takes an essentialist perspective, "the framework [i.e., the rituals that actualise the content of the books] is changeable" and yet "the meaning is eternal", and "the ultimate divine reality is light", reflecting a theme shared by all Iranian religions. According to the scholar Sergey Shtyrkov, the Assian exegetes have created "their own dogma and theological system", through etymology and comparison with other Indo-Iranian traditions. Foltz finds this effort to elaborate theological doctrines from traditional texts comparable to similar efforts found in Germanic Heathenry and modern Hellenism. Apart from the Narts, there are two other traditional texts, both in poetic and in prosaic forms, the Daredzant and the Tsartsiat. The artist and architect Slava Dzhanaïty has published many books on the Ossetian folk religion, emphasising its philosophical aspects in contrast to the more practical leaning of Makeyev's writings.

== Theology and cosmology ==
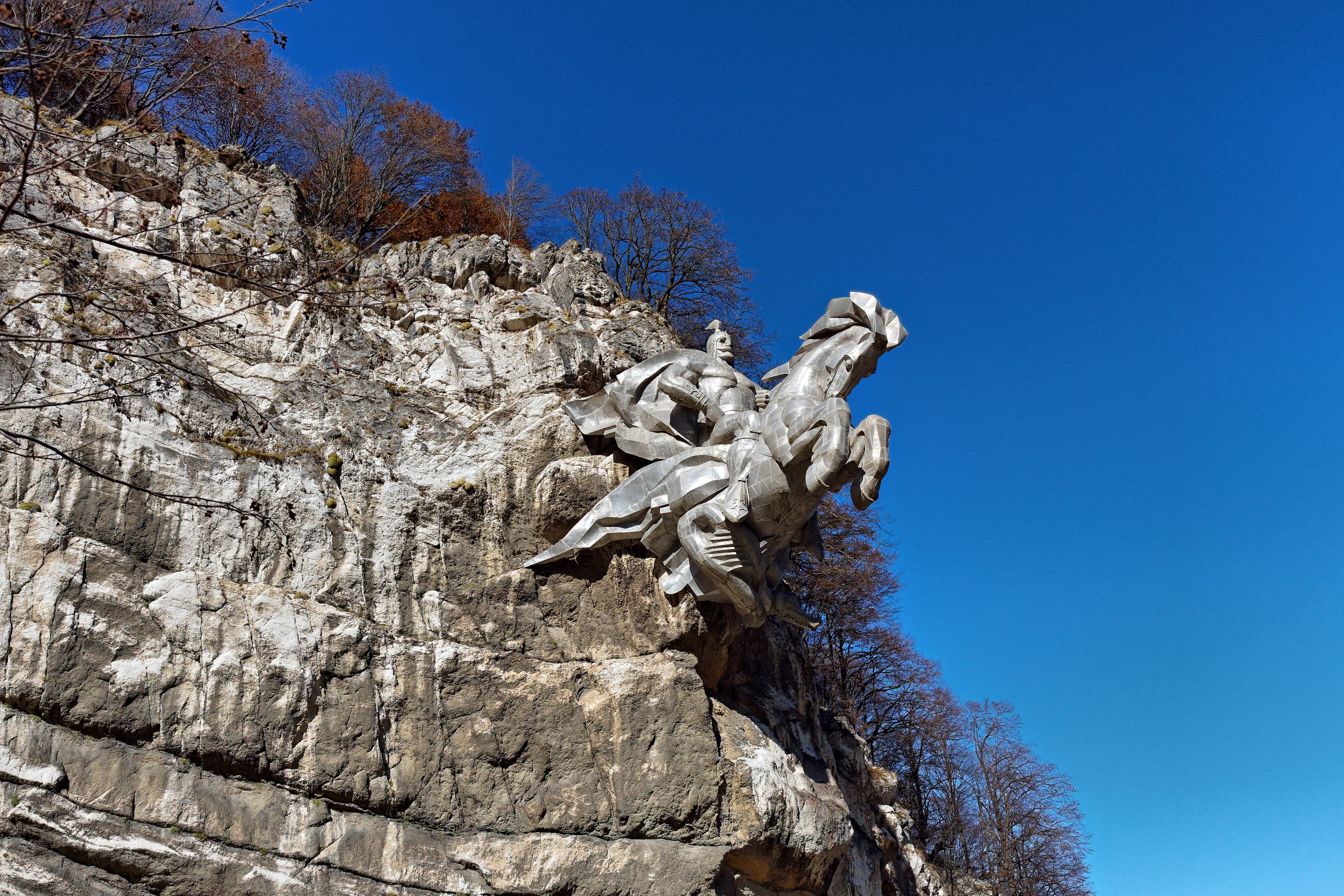
Statue of Uastyrdzhi on his three-legged horse in Alagirsky District, North Ossetia–Alania, towering over the main highway connecting North and South Ossetia. A number of modern statues like this one have been erected throughout Ossetia.

The Dzuary Lægtæ and Khetag Morgoyev define Assian theo-cosmology as a pantheism and non-dualism. Assianism contemplates the worship of a supreme God, Xwytsau (Хуыцау), who is the creator of the universe and of all beings, and is the universe itself, or the universe is "the body of God", comprising both the immanent material world of living and the transcendent spiritual world of God, where the dead make return. It has "no tangible, personal qualities, nor extension in space and time", and it is pure light. The transcendent spiritual dimension of God is the "World of Light" (Рухс Дун, Rukhs Dun) or "True World" (Æцæг Дун, Ætsæg Dun), while the immanent material dimension of life is the "Illusory World" (Мæнг Дун, Mæng Dun). The supreme God may be called upon by a multiplicity of epithets, including simply "Styr Xwytsau" (Стыр Хуыцау), meaning "Great God", but also "Duneskænæg" (Дунескæнæг), "Creator of the Universe", "Meskænæg Xwytsau" (Мескаенаег Хуыцау) and "Xwytsauty Xwytsau" (Хуыцаутты Хуыцау), meaning "God of the Gods". Assian theology affirms that God is within every creature, is "the head of everything", and in humans it manifests as reason, measure and righteousness (bar).

=== God and its triune manifestations ===
Lesser gods, including the most important of them, Uastyrdzhi, are worshipped as intermediaries of Xwytsau. Defined as "forces" and "spirits", they are the "ideas" through which the supreme God governs the universe. In another definition, they are God's "immanent manifestations", elements of the single whole, endowed with form and functions.

The supreme God unfolds in triads. The fundamental triad is that of God–matter–spirit:

- Xwytsau / Xuitsau (Хуыцау, "Heaven") — is the supreme God of the universe, the source of it and of the highest wisdom attainable by humans, creator and patron of worlds, without either image or form, ineffable and omnipresent;
- Iuag (Иуаг) or Iuæg (Иуæг) — is the substance-matter of everything, both uncreated and created worlds;
- Ud (Уд) — is the universal self, that is attained by an individual soul when it identifies with Mon (Мон), the universal mind-spirit, i.e. God's manifestation; ultimately, Mon and Ud are the same, and they are Xwytsau's manifestations.

On the plane of the phenomenon, God's universal mind-spirit further manifests as the triad of:

- Uas (Уас, "Truth", "Good Word") or Ard (Ард, "Right", "Law") – the order of God, which produces well-being in reality;
- Uastyrdzhi (Уастырджи) – the good-spell incarnated in humanity, who are bearers of divine reason, enlightened consciousnesses, awareness of God; in other words, Uastyrdzhi is the archetype of the perfected man, follower of the order of God, and is the mediator of all other deities;
- Duagi (дуаги; pl. дауджытæ / дауджита → daudzhytæ / daudzhita) or duag (дуаг) and barduag (бардуаг) – gods, deities, forces which continuously mould the world alternating forms according to the order of God; the most important among them are the arvon daudzhita (арвон дауджита), the seven deities of the seven planets.

Another distinction is established between the three cosmological states of:

- Zedy (зэды, pl. задтæ → zadtæ) or zhad (жад) – tutelary forces, generative deities, which accompany the birth and development of beings according to the order of God;
- Uayugi (уайуги, pl. уайгуытæ / уайгуыта → uayguytæ / uayguyta) or uayug (уайуг) – destructive forces which violate the order of God and distance from light; in humankind they are the cause of passions, fears, pride and nervous diseases;
- Dalimon (далимон) – the lowest possible state of mind when it identifies with brute matter, chaos; its meaning is "lower (dali) spirit (mon)" and is also a category comprising all terrestrial unclear entities, contrasted with ualimon (уалимон), "upper (uali) spirit (mon)", which comprises all celestial clear entities.

In the theology of Khetag Morgoyev, barduag is a general concept comprehending the zhad and the dzuar (дзуар), with the former representing the deities as transcendent ideas and the latter their immanent extension. The term dzuar is indeed used polysemantically for both a given deity and its shrine(s). The activity of the barduag is called minzhvar (минжвар), a difficult to translate concept which means "making connections", "arranging things in the right way". The most important of them are the cycles of nature and of the cycles of human economy, which coalesce and interconnect in the time–space continuum, constituting the calendar of the year. Each thing has its zhad, there are zhads of the kins/families, of villages, of natural environments; each phenomenon, event and point of time–space contains a zhad.

=== The seven planetary deities and other deities ===
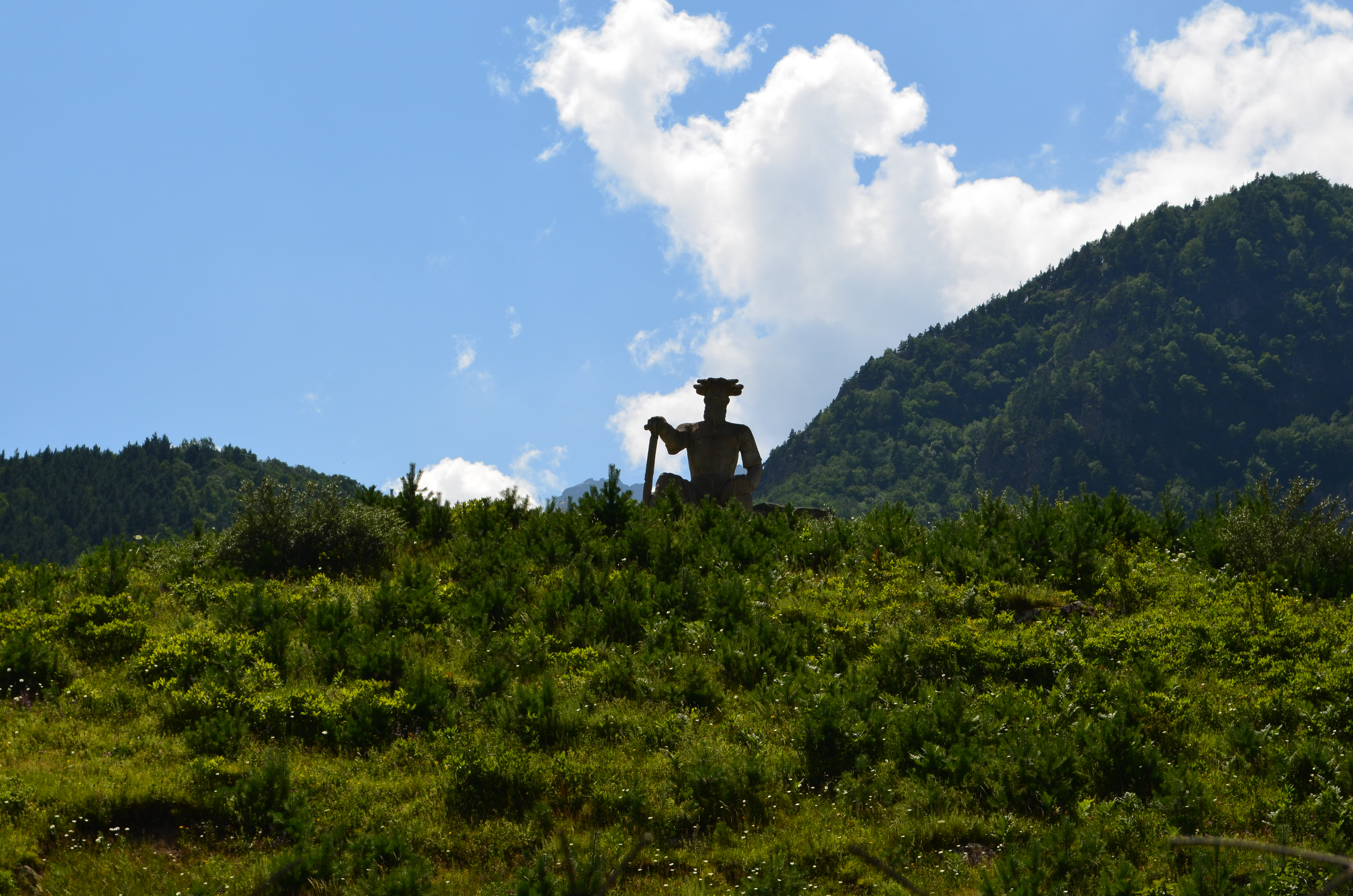
Statue of Æfsati, the Ossetian god of wild animals and patron of hunters, in the Ossetian mountains.

Like other ancient Iranian religions, the ancient Scythian religion contemplated seven deities (арвон дауджита, arvon daudzhita) as most important among the others, each of which associated to a planet and to certain natural phenomena, living beings and plants. The total number of daudzhita recorded in traditional Ossetian texts is about ninety. Uastyrdzhi is the chief among them, as he can access directly the supreme Xwytsau, and all the other deities are introduced by him. They are believed to either favour or punish people, and therefore sacrifices (of bulls, rams, and sometimes goats) are offered to them.

Herodotus attested the seven Scythian gods as: Papaios (corresponding to Zeus), the sky god; Tabiti (Hestia), the hearth goddess (today called Safa, and symbolically associated to the sacred chain of the hearth of the house); Api (Gaia), the earth goddess; Oitosyros (Apollo), the sun god; Argimpasa (Aphrodite), the fertility goddess; and "Herakles" and "Ares" for whom Herodotus did not provide the Scythian name. In ancient Ossetian, the seven days of the week were still named after the seven deities, and, in the conservative Digor dialect of Ossetian, Monday is still Avdisar, "Head of the Seven". According to Foltz, "Ares" was probably Mithra, and the modern Uastyrdzhi; he was widely worshipped through altars in the form of a sword planted in a pile of stones or brushwood. The cult of the sword continued among the Alans as late as the first century CE. Herodotus also mentioned an eighth deity worshipped among the Royal Scythians, Thagimasidas, the water god, equated with Poseidon.

The modern Ossetians have preserved the sevenfold-eightfold structure, though the deities have changed as have their names, which in some cases are adaptations of the names of Christian saints: Uastyrdzhi (whose name derives from "Saint George"), the god of contracts and war (the Iranian Mithra), but also general archetype of men and of disadvantaged people; Uatsilla ("Saint Elijah"), the thunder god; Uatstutyr ("Saint Theodore"), the protector of wolves; Fælværa (maybe the conflation of "Florus and Laurus"), the protector of livestock; Kurdalægon, the blacksmith god (the Iranian Kaveh, Kawa); Donbettyr, the water god; Mikaelgabyrta (conflation of "Michael and Gabriel"), the fertility and underworld god; and Æfsati, the god of the hunt.

=== Ethics ===
According to Assian doctrines, human nature is the same as the nature of all being. Humankind is a microcosm within a macrocosm, or broader context, and the same is true for all other beings. The universe is kept in harmony by Uas or Ard, the order of God, the foundation of divine reason, measure, and righteousness (bar). The deities (daudzhita or ualimon) form the world according to this universal law, while demons (uayguyta or dalimon) are those entities which act disrupting the good contexts of the deities, and are the causes of illness and death. Every entity is governed "by it itself" within its own sphere of responsibility; God and its order are not seen as an external force of coercion.

These positive and negative forces also influence humanity's consciousness: A person may take the side of either deities or demons, and this choice will shape this person's life and action. If a person is able to subdue passions, not putting exclusively egoistic material motives in their actions, they become open to the Uas, or its receptacle (уасдан, uasdan; good-spell receptacle), a wise noble who perceives the order of God and higher spirits and receives their energy, acting like them by producing good, truth and beauty. On the contrary, if a person's actions are driven by egoistic material ends, Dalimon and demons own that person, who then becomes a source of evil, lies and ugliness. In the words of Khetag Morgoyev, humankind is endowed with the free will to choose between good and evil, deities and demons.

== Practices ==
=== Myths and rites ===
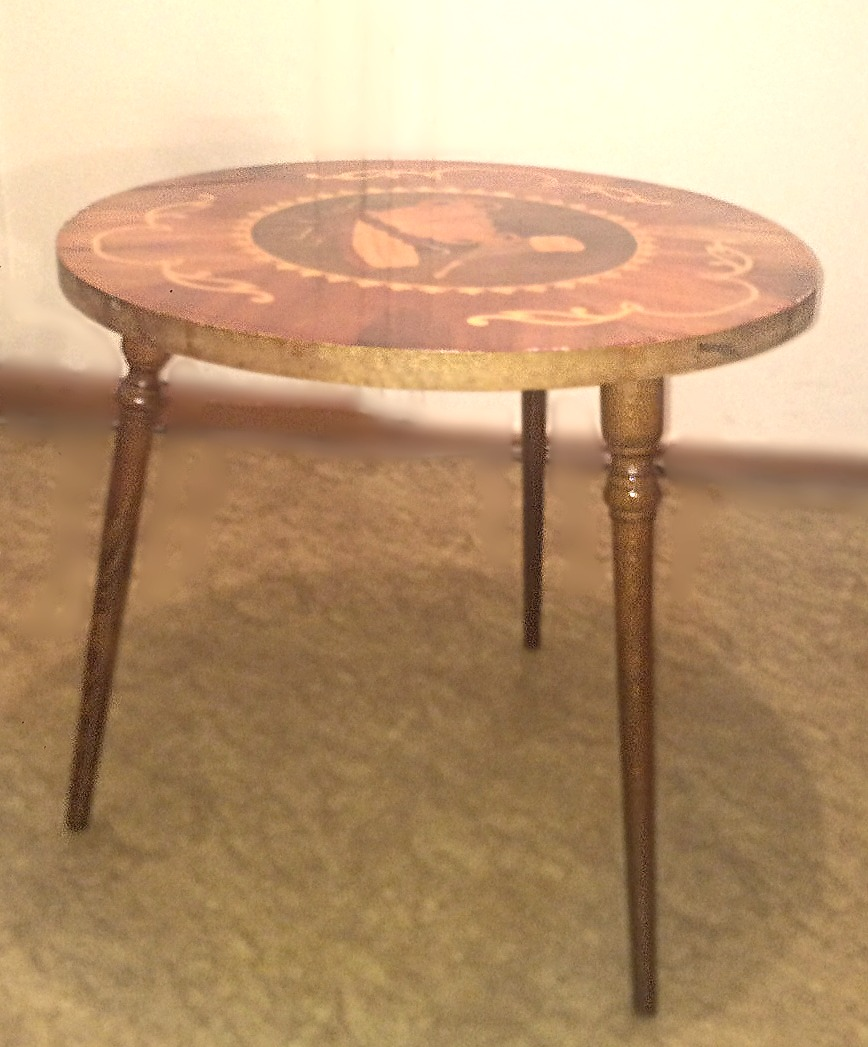
Specimen of fyng ritual table. Such type of ritual table is already attesed in Scythian times.

By citing V. I. Dobrenkov, the Dzuary Lægtæ emphasise the semantic unity of myth and ritual within the practice of the cult, the first being "a system of verbal symbols" and the second being "a system of symbols as objects and actions". There is much variation of myths and rites throughout Ossetia, though underlaid by the same semantics, testifying the vitality of the tradition. According to Shtyrkov, the modern Assian movement tries "to create a unified ritual system, every tiny element of which has a theological motivation". There have been efforts in the second half of the 2010s for the creation of a unified Ossetian religious calendar.

The Ossetian calendar has many days dedicated to ceremonies, some of which are performed within the household and others at outdoor sacred spaces. Household ceremonies are centred around the hearth chain (safa, which functions as a symbol of the hearth goddess Safa, representing the world tree) which upholds a cauldron, over a fire (the holy element in Indo-Iranian religions). There are sixty fixed celebrations throughout the year, the most important of which is the Week of Uastyrdzhi beginning the last Tuesday of November. Holidays are linked to the days of the week, the phases of the moon, and the solstices; for example, the Ossetian New Years is celebrated on the second Thursday of January. The Day of Uastyrdzhi, together with those of Uatstutyr and Uatsilla, form the complex of the solar holidays, with the three deities representing the three interconnected phases of the Sun and the corresponding manifestations in nature and in the economic activities of mankind; Uastyrdzhi is the Winter Sun which dies and then rises again, Uatstutyr is the Spring Sun which becomes more and more powerful towards Summer, while Uatsilla is the Summer Sun in its full splendor, whose power then fades in Autumn towards the new Uastyrdzhi.

Ritual ceremonies consist in holding a feast (фынг, fyng or кувд, kuvyn) in honour of a particular deity. The ceremony is led by a "holy man" (dzuary læg), who invokes the deity through the offering of a "toast", kuyvd (куывд), which also means "prayer", towards the sky. Beer is the substance usually offered in libation, though it may be substituted by any type of strong liquor. During the ceremony other toasts are made to the other deities, and ceremonial cakes made from cheese (ualibakh) are consumed along with meat from an animal sacrificed for the ritual. Only herbivorous animals like bulls, rams, goats or lambs, are acceptable as sacrifice, and fish are accepted too. Much like ancient Scythians, as attested by Herodotus, the Ossetians do not sacrifice omnivorous animals like pigs, and chickens. Beer and other alcoholic beverages are also generously consumed for each toast, echoing the ancient Scythian custom. Such ceremonies may be accompanied by a circular dance called simd. A distinctive version of the simd has one circle of dancers standing on the shoulders of another circle of dancers. The Narts tell that the simd was invented by the hero Soslan. A system of divination using sticks, already attested in Herodotus' accounts of Scythian customs, is still practised today.

The scheme of the prayer displays the process of creation of the world: Starting with the invocation of the supreme God, the supreme source, then it tells about the beginning and manifestation of things; graphically, it is compared to a mandala, a point from which the forces of the world depart in circle. The same scheme is also represented by the ceremonial cake, constituted by three circular layers with a hole in the middle, representing the three levels of reality: sky, Sun and water/earth. The three-legged ceremonial table itself represents the threefold model of reality, while its round surface — like the round surface of the ceremonial cake — represents the Sun and the infiniteness of God. On the table is also laid down the meat of sacrificed animals with an equilateral cross (dzuar, the same term for the manifested state of a deity) carved on the forehead, which represents the point of origination and manifestation of divinity like the hole at the centre of the ceremonial cake. For a particular deity worshipped during the feast, another ceremonial cake, different from the main one, is prepared and laid down on the ceremonial table. This cake is constituted by three triangular pies arranged to form a nine-pointed star if looked from above.

=== Shrines and temples ===
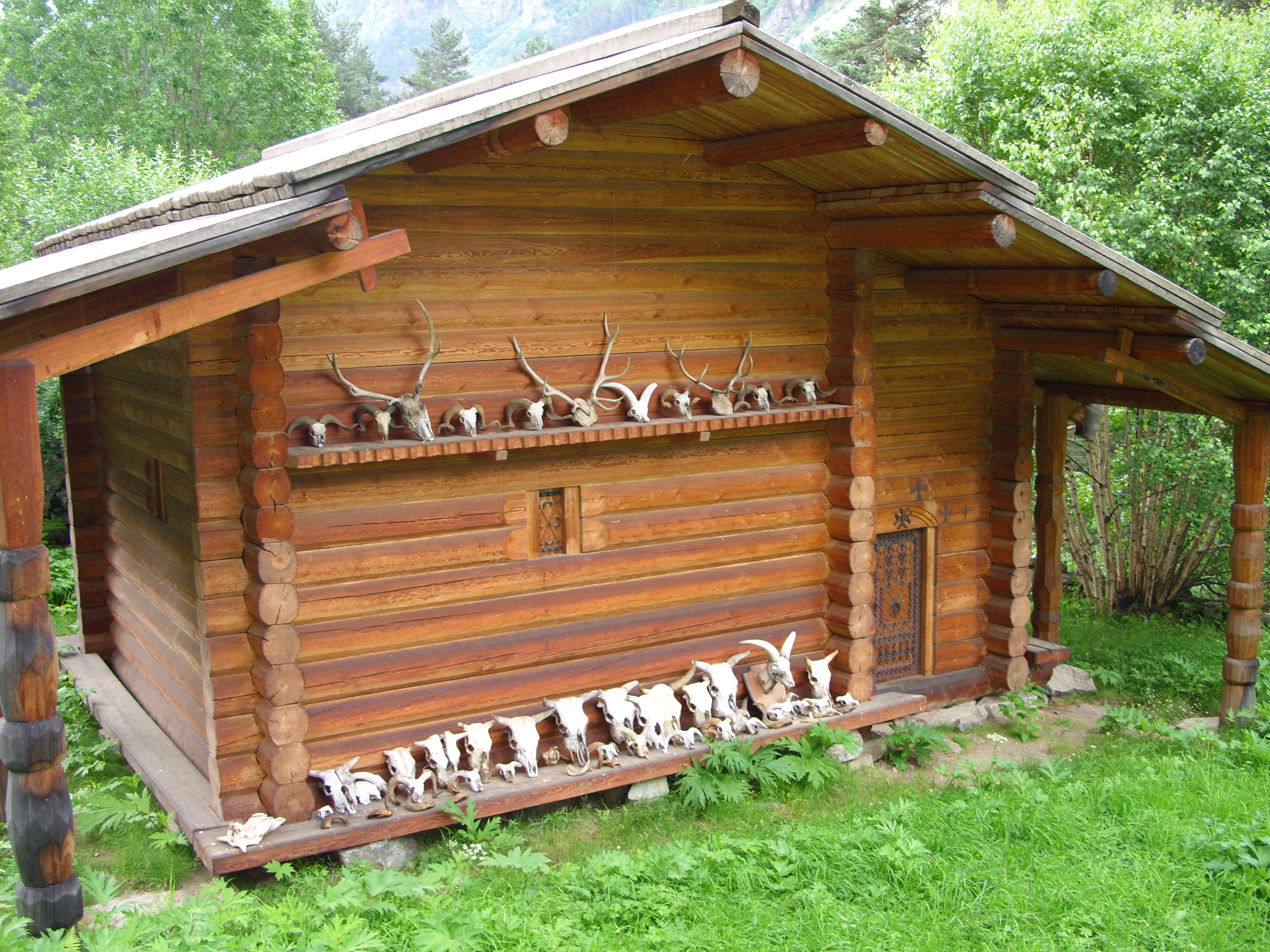
Rekom Temple in Tsey, Alagirsky District, North Ossetia–Alania. Dating back to the 2nd century BCE, and rebuilt numerous times throughout history (the latest in 1972 and 1995), it is dedicated to Uastyrdzhi, and it is the site of a major festival celebrated in mid-June called Rekomy Bærægbon (Рекомы Бæрæгбон). Being Uastyrdzhi the Lægty Dzuar (Лæгты Дзуар), "Patron of Men", the sacred space is forbidden to women, who perform their rites at a smaller temple nearby.

Ossetian deities are associated with natural phenomena, and communal ceremonies are usually held at natural shrines or sanctuaries called kuvandon (кувандон, literally "place of prayer"), which are often provided with a temple built in wood or stone. Sanctuaries may be in groves, forests, on hills, in fields, in caves, and in any place where it is believed there being a "strong energy field". The journalist Alan Mamiev observed that "Ossetians pray in nature" and "every family has its own shrine on their land". Slava Dzhanaïty, who projected the reconstruction the Rekom Temple, an important Ossetian shrine in Tsey, Alagirsky District, North Ossetia–Alania, destroyed by an accidental fire in 1995, observed that:

Gratefully appreciating the works of nature, the ancient sage did not build gigantic structures that stand out and argue with the environment created by the world's best architect mother nature, just as he did not try to restrict the presence of the Spirit within fixed boundaries. [...] the shrine is both the building itself and the land that surrounds it; the whole is in complete harmony with nature. Therefore, the shrine should not rise above nature or make it ugly; Ossetian shrines are constructed only of local natural materials, and the architectural lines are designed to mimic the surrounding natural features.

Ruslan Kuchiev, the president of the Styr Nykhas in 2019, said:

It is these sacred places that give us our energy. [...] You have to be part of nature, that's what our ancestors thought. You have to live in harmony with the things that surround you.

There are many shrines in Ossetia; the Alagir region alone has about three hundred of them. In the village of Gaiat, in the region of Digoria of western Ossetia there is a temple dedicated to the cosmological seven deities. These shrines are places where to make oaths, contracts, weddings, and where to identify violators of the divine law, the Ard. Within the private household, the most sacred area is the khadzar (хждзар); it is the kuvandon of the house, where the hearth and the chain of the goddess Safa are located. The sacred chain of Safa is also present at many public kuvandon. Such chain symbolises the world tree which connects the three realms of sky, Sun and water/earth.

== Symbolism ==
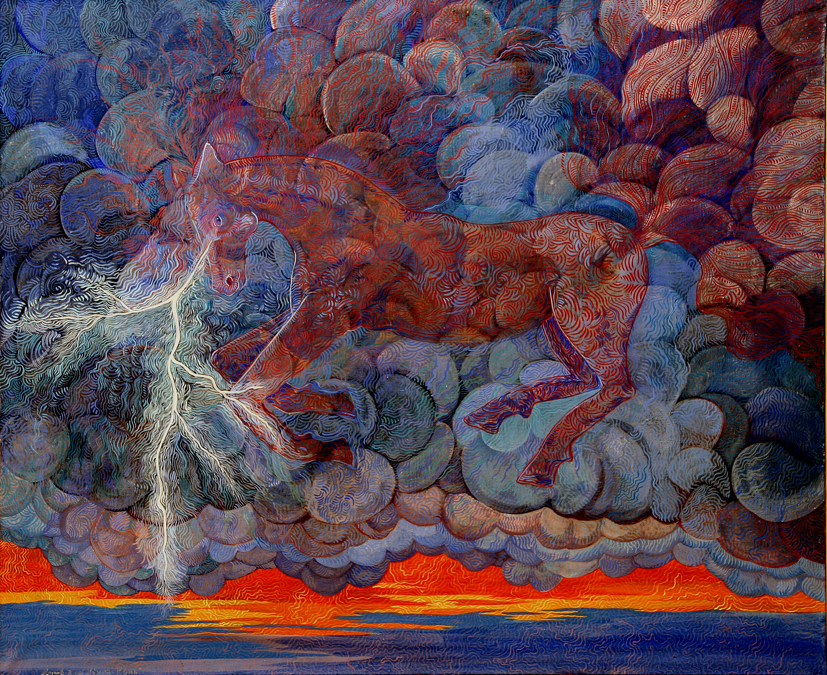
Thunder Horse, by the Russian artist Lola V. Lonli, 2000.

The most important symbol in Assianism, according to the Dzuary Lægtæ, is the Uatsamongzh (Уацамонгж) or Uatsamonga (Уацамонга), a bowl, goblet or cup mentioned in the Ossetian Nart epics whose name means "indicating (amongzh) truth (uats)" or "revelator of divinity". It is a symbol of truth representing the inverted vault of the sky, which can saturate the worthy ones (the hero of the Nart epics) with unearthly knowledge. The origins of this symbol go back to the earliest Indo-Europeans and it is also present in later Celtic and Germanic cultures. In medieval Western European legends, the magic chalice took the Christianised form of the Holy Grail. Another important symbol within the religion is the horse, another ancient Indo-European symbol, which is associated in Ossetian culture with funeral rites, with both celestial and terrestrial forces, and which appears as the steed of deities in many visions.

The "Three Tears of God" (Trislezi Boga), a symbol representing Assian theology and three most important Ossetian shrines, was first "perceived" and drawn by the architect and painter Slava Dzhanaïty, and has become the most common symbol of the faith, "seen everywhere throughout North and South Ossetia on t-shirts, car stickers, and advertisements". Within the three "tears" of Dzhanaïty's symbol there are three equilateral crosses; "cross" is said dzuar in Ossetian, the same term for the manifestation of divinity. The three most important Ossetian shrines that the symbol represents are the Rekom Temple, the Mykalygabyrtæ Temple to the southeast of Rekom, and the Tarandzhelos Temple located south of Mount Kazbek in Georgia.

== Relations with other philosophies and religions ==
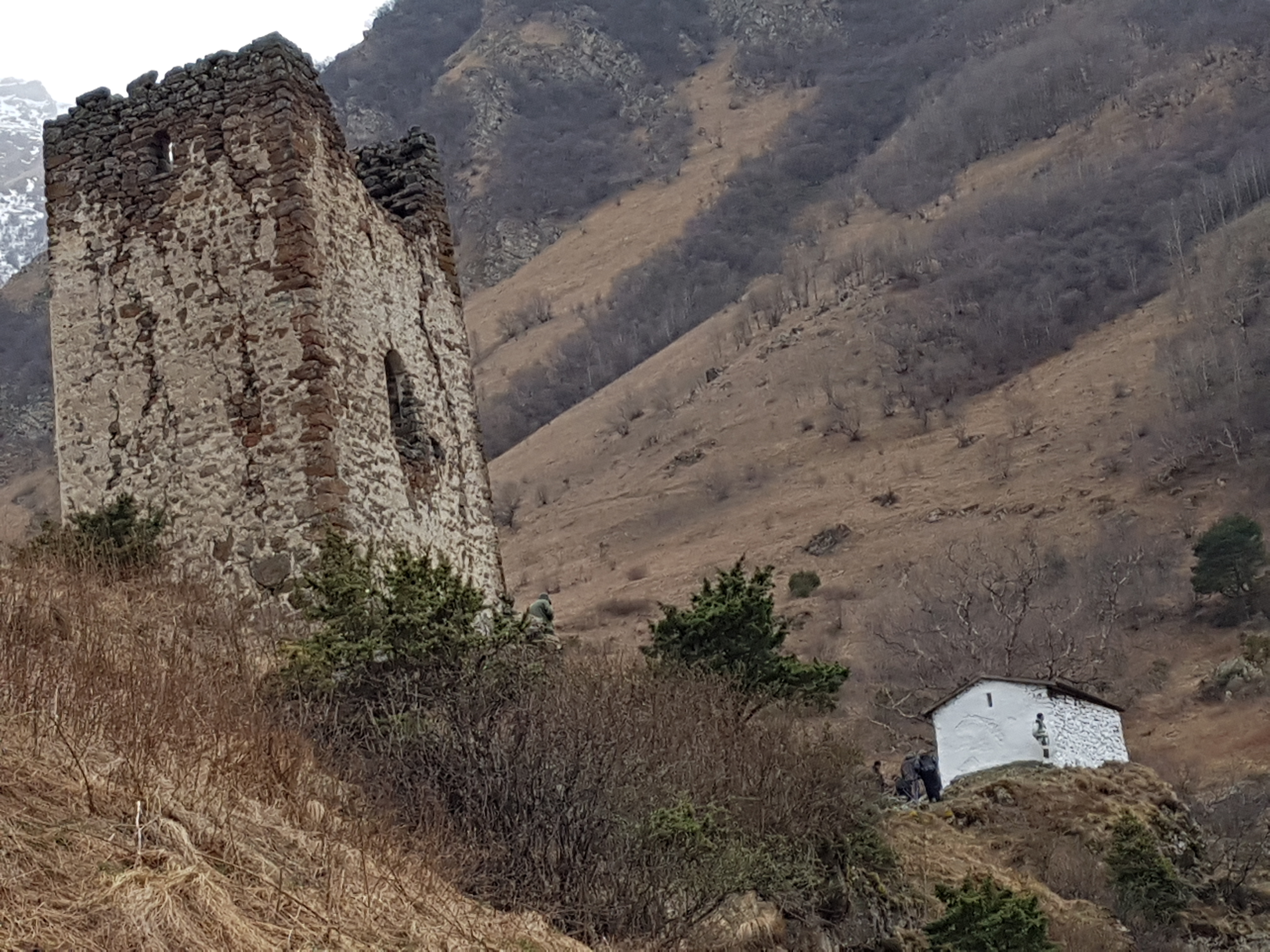
Temple of Mairam of the High Tower in the Kurtat Gorge, Vladikavkaz, North Ossetia–Alania.

=== With Eurasianism ===
In 2009, at the Center for Conservative Research of Moscow State University, a conference was held about the role of Ossetians in Russian history led by the Eurasianist philosopher Aleksandr Dugin. Among participants there was Daurbek Makeyev, the head of the Atsætæ religious organisation of Assianism. On that occasion, Dugin praised the revitalisation of Ossetian culture for it having preserved a pristine Indo-European heritage. He discussed the importance of Scythian culture in the development of broader Eurasia, recognising that Scythian culture had an enormous impact on the development of Finno-Ugric, Turkic and Slavic cultures, and despite this European scholars have paid little attention to it so far. Makeyev declared that the Atsætæ organisation was founded for fostering traditional Ossetian religion, but also to share the heritage of Assianism with other peoples, because "what was preserved in Ossetia is not [merely] Ossetian, but is a worldwide heritage". Russian Assian resources present the religion as a universal truth "addressed to the whole world".

=== With Christianity ===
Scythian Assian leaders, notably Daurbek Makeyev, have articulated strong positions against Christianity, criticising it for its alien origins, its Jewish origins, and criticising the corruption of the Russian Orthodox Church. In 2002 and 2007 works he states that the Christian religion breaks the connection of a nation with its own spirit, thus dooming this nation to degeneration and death:

2002: A person who abandoned his people's God and adopted the alien faith (ideology) from Moses' followers brings damnation not only upon himself and his descendants but upon his whole people and all their lands and possessions. [...] If the people forget their [religious] tradition, it will lose its significance to God and be doomed to extinction.
2007: Moses understood perfectly that to betray some people's God means to break off their roots, to bring about universal debauchery, to loosen traditional values and thereby weaken their ethnic identity and make that people perish. He considered a betrayal of somebody's God as the ultimate crime — as a crime against the Nation.

At the same time, Makeyev criticises Christianity for its "anti-environmentalist essence", which stems from a theology which separates God from nature, and the sacred from the profane. In a 2019 speech he affirmed:

Unlike in Christianity which separates God from his Creation, we take a collective approach where everything is interconnected. [...] They think that only the specific plot of land on which a shrine sits is holy. [...] They go to Rekom [Ossetia's most important popular shrine] and they treat it as if it were a church, separate from the surrounding area. No one would throw garbage at Rekom itself, but they don't realize that there is no division between sacred and non-sacred land; every place has its resident deity, who will be offended if anyone violates its sanctity.

The Dzuary Lægtæ articulate a historical critique of Christianisation: For them, Orthodox Christianity is an "alien religion" that "seeks to captivate and corrupt the souls of the conquered", and in Ossetia it was spread by foreigners and by the tsarist autocracy through coercion, by police measures and by luring children and the poor with gifts, a process which led to the disintegration of families and to the ruin of farms. According to them, Islam spread among the Ossetians as an alternative to avoid forced Christianisation. The Russian Orthodox Church is for them a "socio-cultural and cultural-political problem" in Ossetia, as it has "neither knowledge of the peculiarities of Ossetia, nor interest in its culture, nor concern for its future".

The movement of Scythian Assianism has attracted strong hostility and complaints from Christian and Islamic authorities. The Russian Orthodox archbishop Leonid in Moscow sought to silence Makeyev by trying to ban his books as "extremist literature", calling on his personal contacts when he was a general in the Federal Security Service. The Russian Orthodox Church has also been trying to have the Rekom Temple destroyed and a church built in its place, but without success so far.

== Demography and institutions ==
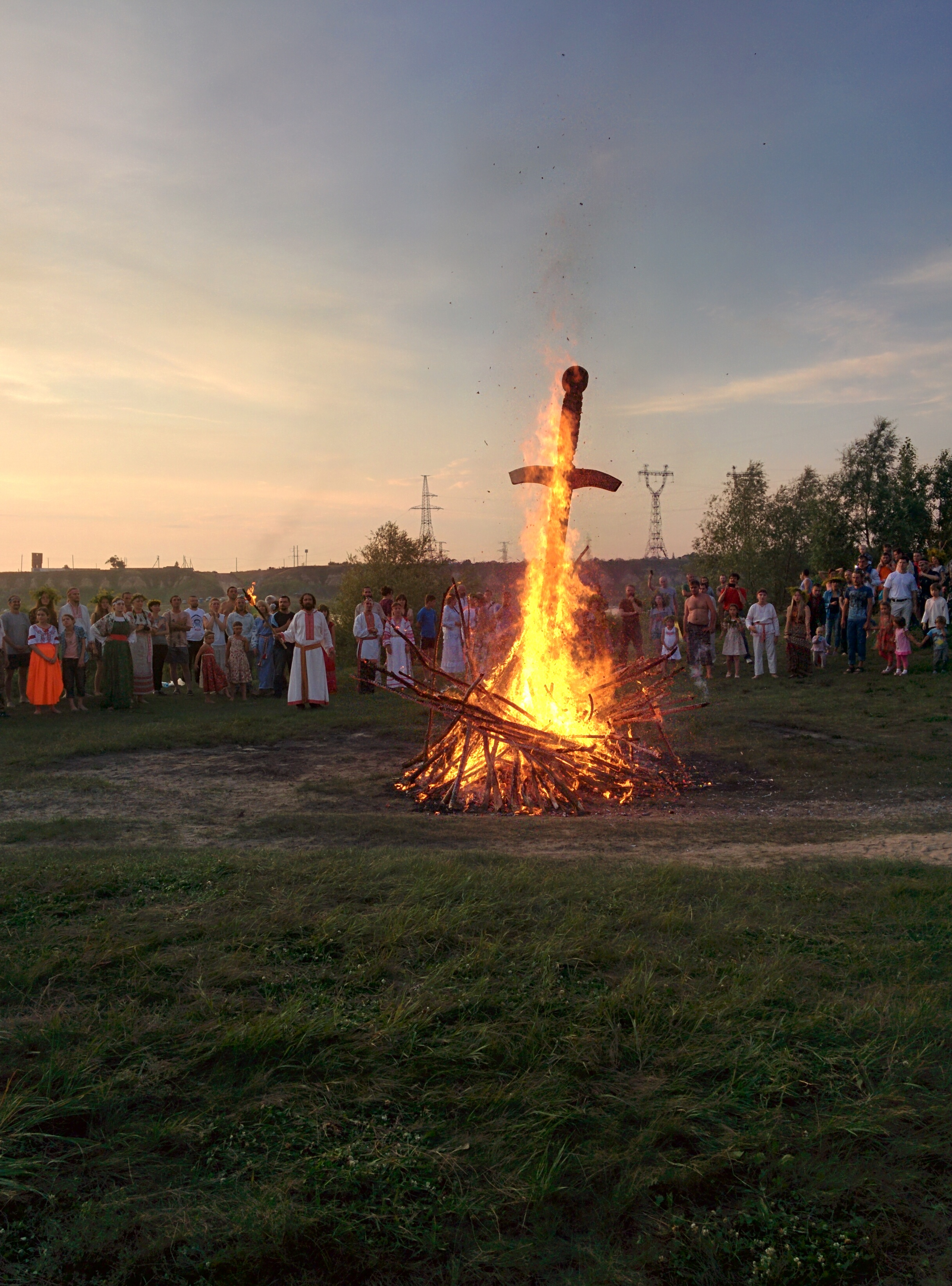
Russian Rodnover Ynglists in Omsk, Omsk Oblast practising the Scythian ritual of the sword planted in brushwood.

The movement of Scythian Assianism is present in both North Ossetia–Alania and South Ossetia, though it is more widespread in the former. Some categories particularly well represented among the believers are the military, hunters, and sportsmen, attracted by the heroic ethics of the Narts, but also intellectuals and artists. According to Shtyrkov, the movement "occupies a visible place in the social landscape of the republic". Scythian Assianism is also popular in Russia and Ukraine among Cossacks, especially those who claim a Scythian identity to distinguish themselves from Slavs. Some of them identify within the category of Rodnovery, the general "Slavic Native Faith". According to Foltz, the movement has become so widespread among the Ossetians that its success is "unrivalled" among all Neopagan religious movements. According to the 2012 Arena Atlas complement to the 2010 census of Russia, 29.4% of the population of North Ossetia (comprising Ossetians as well as ethnic Russians) were adherents of the Ossetian Pagan religion. Authorities of the religion itself claim that a large majority of over 55% of the ethnic Ossetians are adherents of the religion.

On 18 May 2014, the "Forum of Ossetian Kins–National Forum 'Alania'" was held with the participation of 1,500 delegates of Ossetian traditional kins from both North Ossetia and South Ossetia. Among the issues considered at the forum, the kins drafted a document entitled On Amendments and Additions to the Constitution of the Republic of North Ossetia–Alania in which they proposed, "in order to preserve and develop the culture of the Ossetian people", the constitutional recognition of the Ossetian worldview and religion as "the most important part" of Ossetian culture, the recognition of the Ossetian mountainous regions as "the material basis of the spiritual enlightenment of the Ossetian and other Indo-European (Aryan) peoples from ancient times to the present [...] The sacred center of the Ossetian people, of general Aryan significance", and the adoption of a framework for the standardisation of the Ossetian language as a state language.

=== Russia ===
- Council of Priests for Ancient Sanctuaries—Dzuary Lægtæ (Совет служителей древних святилищ "Дзуары Лæгтæ") — an informal council for the coordination of the Ossetian clergy formed between 2014 and 2016 in Vladikavkaz, North Ossetia–Alania, on the initiative of the public organisation of the Ossetian kins Yudzinad (Иудзинад);
- Atsætæ—Mozdoksky District's Community of the As (Районная моздокская община Ассов "Ацæтæ") — an organisation registered in 2009 in the city of Mozdok, North Ossetia–Alania, under leadership of Daurbek Makeyev;
- Ætsæg Din (Æцæг Дин) — an organisation registered in Vladikavkaz in 2009 and related to the Atsætæ community;
- Community of the Temple of Mairam of the High Tower (Цъæззиу Уалæмæсыг Майрæмы дзуары къорд) — in the Kurtat Gorge, Vladikavkaz;
- Styr Nykhas ("Great Council") — established in 1993 in North Ossetia–Alania;
- All-Russian Movement of the Scythians (Всероссийское движение скифов).

=== South Ossetia ===
- Ira Farn - an Assianist interests political party.

=== Ukraine ===
- North Caucasian Scythian Regional Fire

== See also ==
- Slavic Rodnovery
- Germanic Heathenism
- Armenian Hetanism
- Ynglism
- Iranian religions
- Abkhaz neopaganism

== Citations ==
=== Sources ===
- Bourdeaux, Michael; Filatov, Sergey, eds. (2006). Современная религиозная жизнь России. Опыт систематического описания [Contemporary religious life of Russia. Systematic description of experiences] (in Russian). Vol. 4. Moscow: Keston Institute; Logos. ISBN 5987040574.
- Foltz, Richard (2019). "Scythian Neo-Paganism in the Caucasus: The Ossetian Uatsdin as a 'Nature Religion'". Journal for the Study of Religion, Nature, and Culture. 13 (3): 314–332. doi:10.1558/jsrnc.39114. S2CID 213692638.
- Foltz, Richard (2020). "The Rekom Shrine in North Ossetia-Alania and its Annual Ceremony". Iran and the Caucasus. 24 (1). Brill: 38–52. doi:10.1163/1573384X-20200104. hdl:1885/733807202. ISSN 1609-8498. S2CID 216345025.
- Foltz, Richard (2021). The Ossetes: Modern-Day Scythians of the Caucasus. London: Bloomsbury. ISBN 9780755618453.
- Lesiv, Mariya (2013). The Return of Ancestral Gods: Modern Ukrainian Paganism as an Alternative Vision for a Nation. McGill-Queen's Studies in the History of Religion. Vol. 2. McGill-Queen's Press - MQUP. ISBN 978-0773589667.
- Makeyev, Daurbek B. (2007). "Ассианство и мировая культура" [Assianism and world culture]. Религиозное мировоззрение в Нартском эпосе [Religious worldview in the Nart epic] (in Russian). Vladikavkaz.
- McKay, George (2009). Subcultures and New Religious Movements in Russia and East-Central Europe. Peter Lang. ISBN 978-3039119219.
- Popov, Igor (2016). Справочник и новости всех религиозных течений и объединений в России [The Reference Book on All Religious Branches and Communities in Russia] (in Russian).
- Schmitz, Timo (2015). "Etseg Din – Caucasian paganism from Ossetia" (PDF). Archived from the original (PDF) on 22 March 2020.
- Shnirelman, Victor A. (2002). "'Christians! Go home': A Revival of Neo-Paganism between the Baltic Sea and Transcaucasia (An Overview)". Journal of Contemporary Religion. 17 (2): 197–211. doi:10.1080/13537900220125181. S2CID 51303383.
- Shizhensky, Roman V. (2018a). "Интервью с Х. Моргоевым" [Interview with H. Morgoyev]. Colloquium Heptaplomeres (in Russian). V. Nizhny Novgorod: Minin University: 128–133. ISSN 2312-1696.
- Shizhensky, Roman V. (2018b). "Официальный ответ совета служителей святилищ Осетии на запрос Р. В. Шиженского" [The official response of the Council of Ministers of the Sanctuaries of Ossetia to the request of R. V. Shizhensky]. Colloquium Heptaplomeres (in Russian). V. Nizhny Novgorod: Minin University: 134–145. ISSN 2312-1696.
- Shtyrkov, Sergey (2011). "Religious nationalism in contemporary Russia: the case of the Ossetian ethnic religious project" (PDF). In Alapuro, Risto (ed.). Understanding Russianness. Routledge. pp. 232–244. Archived from the original on 2018-02-20.
- Shtyrkov, Sergey (2016). "'The Fight between Ases and Devas Runs through Our Whole Existence': The Conspirological Imaginary of North Ossetian Intellectuals and the Search for Meaning in National History" (PDF). Forum for Anthropology and Culture (12). Saint Petersburg: Kunstkamera, European University at Saint Petersburg: 230–252. Archived from the original (PDF) on 30 March 2021.
