= Aminon =

Figure in Ossetian mythology

Aminon (Ossetian: Аминон) is a female creature and gatekeeper of the underworld in Ossetian mythology.

In the Nart saga, on the orders of Barastyr, who is both a judge and a jailer for some of the dead and a hospitable host for others, Aminon opens the iron gates of the underworld, which can only be reached before sunset. According to other versions of the saga, Aminon stands at the gates of the underworld and asks everyone who approaches them about the deeds that the deceased has done during his life. Aminon evaluating the earthly affairs of the deceased shows them the way either to heaven or hell.

If the deceased lies, then Aminon beats them on the lips with a broom dipped in blood and throws them into the river. Under the feet of the one who spoke truthfully about the affairs of his life, the log located above the river and dividing the world of the living and the dead expands and turns into a beautiful bridge.

To this day, the Ossetians have preserved the tradition of burying the dead before sunset.

== See also ==
- Modgud
- Barastyr
- Nart saga
