= Alardy =

Mythological figure in Ossetia, Iran

Alardy (Ossetian: Аларды, from Georgian: ალავერდობა - Alaverdoba) is a spirit or god of the Ossetian mythology, who inflicts smallpox and measles on children.

In the Nart saga, Alardy appears episodically in different cycles. He protects the Narts from skin diseases or sends them.

== Etymology ==
The name Alardy comes from the locus of Alaverdoba in Kakheti region with the ancient and highly revered in Eastern Georgia church of John the Baptist, where a festival was held annually in September, attracting many pilgrims, including many sick people who came in the hope of receiving healing. In confirmation of the origin from the celebration of Alaverdoba Abaev writes that among the Ossetians and Georgians-Mokhevians of the Darial Gorge, the celebration to the deity of Alardy coincides with the day of John the Baptist. Also the analogue of the Ossetian Alardy is Aku Zushan (the god of smallpox) among the Abkhazians.

== In folklore ==
The earliest mention of the cult of Alardy is in the work of B. Gatiev “Superstitions and prejudices among the Ossetians”. The cycle of spring holidays celebrated twice a year includes the cult of the “patron of smallpox Alarda”, which is mentioned by Miller and Ouarziati.

Alardy was represented as a celestial descending to earth along a golden or silver staircase and depicted as a red winged monster with an ugly face that instilled fear in people. In order to ease the anger of this spirit, superstitious Ossetians built numerous sanctuaries in his honor and prayed to him: in North Ossetia there are more than 30 sanctuaries in honor of Alardy and in South Ossetia - more than 7.

One of the serious curses of the Ossetians: "Алардыйы фыдæх ссар" (may the wrath of Alardy overtake you).

But Abaev also called Alardy the pagan "medical" god, who was endowed with the ability not only to infect the disease, but also to heal from it. To propitiate him at his feast they slaughter a sacrificial animal - a white lamb or a one-year-old ram the head, legs and heart of which teenagers with songs and dances brought to the place of veneration of the spirit. In the north of Ossetia, women were not allowed to visit the sanctuaries of Alardy, but in the south, on the contrary women cooked sweet braga, baked three cakes and sometimes they were sprinkled with sugar and went with children to the sanctuary with dances and songs.

According to reports, an obligatory element of this celebration in honor of Alardy was the performance of ritual songs. However, it is worth noting that in later ethnographic records the performance of songs is rarely recorded. As the researchers note, this element of the rite eventually becomes optional.

== See also ==
- Alaverdoba
- Nart saga
