= Safa (mythology) =

Ossetian mythology God of the hearth

Safa (Ossetian: Сафа, from the Greek: Σάββας - "Sabbas the Sanctified") in Ossetian mythology God of the hearth chain. Identified with the deity of blacksmiths Kurdalægon.

According to legend, Safa gave people a hearth chain (Ossetian: рæхыс), which played a significant role in social and family life. People pronouncing solemn oaths and bloodlines as a sign of reconciliation, forgiving each other and held on to this chain.

It is known from Ossetian traditions that the mother laying the child down for the night and entrusting him to the protection of Safa, kept one hand on a chain. During the farewell to the parents home the bride went around the hearth chain three times and as a sign of farewell to her native home, she touched the chain and in the same way entering the new family for the first time, she acted in her husband's house too.

== In the Nart saga ==
In the Nart saga Safa is called "heavenly", being a friend of the Narts and a teacher of the son of Uryzmag, Crym-Sultan. The clan of Æhsærtæggatæ wishing to carry out a blood feud, tries to bribe Safa to give Crym-Sultan to them .

Also in the Nart saga there is a story about how Safa, wishing to do good to the young Sosruko invited the dauags (spirits) to the feast, whom Sosruko served during their feast, at the same time asking each of them for gifts corresponding to their specialization.

== See also ==
- Kurdalægon
- Ossetian mythology
- Sabbas the Sanctified

== Sources ==
- Dumézil, Georges (2001). Ossetian saga and mythology. Vladikavkaz: Science. pp. 176, 210.
- Meletinsky, Yeleazar (1990). Mythological Dictionary. Soviet Encyclopedia. p. 672.
- "Семь богов и семь миров в осетинской мифологии — Seven gods and seven worlds in Ossetian mythology". south-ossetia.info
