= Tutyr =

Lord of the wolves in Ossetian mythology

Tutyr (Ossetian: Тутыр) is the lord of the wolves in Ossetian mythology; the name "Tutyr" comes from the name of Saint Theodore Tiron.

It is believed that Tutyr often quarrels with the patron of sheep Fælværa. The Ossetians believed that wolves, without the will of Tutyr, could not attack livestock, and that calling on Tutyr at the time when wolves attack livestock would result in the wolves running away. To save cattle from the attack of wolves people also tried to propitiate Tutyr with the annual "Tutyrta" holiday during the first three days of Great Lent. On the first day of the holiday, shepherds kept a very strict fast. On the eve of the holiday, a sacrifice was made to Tutyr in the form of a goat or a ram, and Tutyr was asked not to send wolves. If this custom was ignored, it was believed that Tutyr would become angry and would certainly order the wolves to exterminate the cattle and even the man himself, who had forgotten to sacrifice to Tutyr.

In the Nart saga Tutyr is a friend of the Narts, whom he helps repeatedly. For example, Sosruko was hardened in wolf's milk.
