= Xucau =

Xucaw or Xwytsau (Ossetian: Хуыцау, romanized: Xwycaw pronounced [χʷəˈt͡sɒw]) is the supreme god of the Ossetian mythology, who rules over all the heavenly spirits and deities (called zædtæ and dawdžytæ).

His name is often being considered a cognate of Iranian Khuda (see Sogdian Xutāw, Khwarezmian Xudāw), although some other scholars claimed that it has Caucasian roots (see Lezgin xucar "god"), which, in turn, may have Iranian origins.

He is known by a number of epithets:

- Styr Xwytsau (Стыр Хуыцау, the Great God)
- Duneskænæg (Дунескӕнӕг, Creator of the Universe)
- Me Skænæg Xwytsau (Ме Скӕнӕг Хуыцау)
- Xwycæwtty Xwytsau (Хуыцӕутты Хуыцау, God of the Gods)

He is still worshipped as the supreme creator god in Uatsdin, and is believed to reside in every living being, and to manifest in mankind as consciousness and worthy action.

== Sources ==
- Schmitz, Timo. "Etseg Din – Caucasian paganism from Ossetia". 2015.
