= Dargavs =

Dargavs Даргавс
- Settlement

Other transcription(s)
  - Ossetic: Дæргъæвс
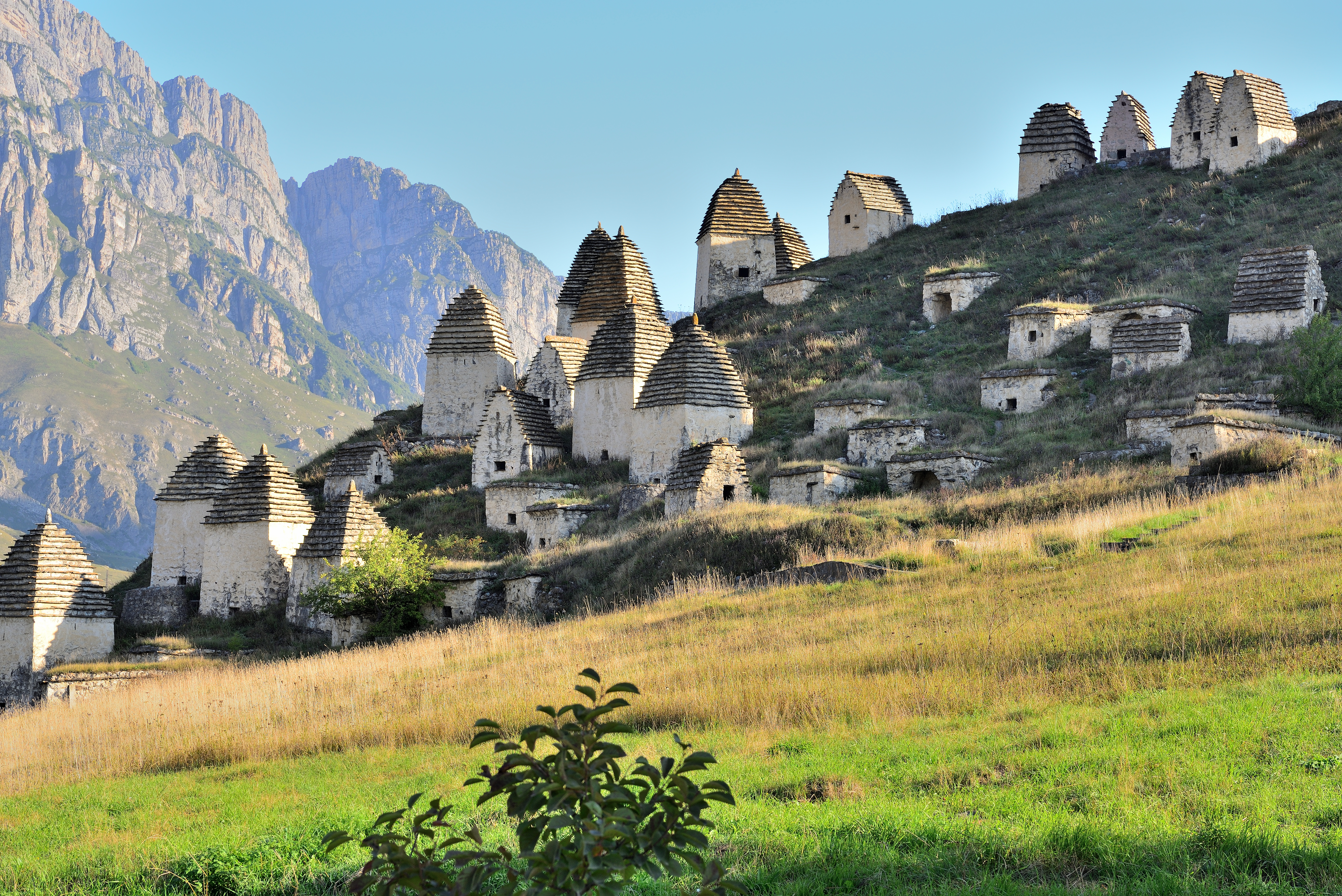
- Dargavs' City of the Dead
- Interactive map of Dargavs
- Location of Dargavs Dargavs (North Ossetia–Alania)
- Coordinates: 42°50′N 44°25′E
- Country: Russia
- Federal subject: North Ossetia–Alania
- Administrative district: Prigorodny District

Population (2010 Census)
  - Total: 155
  - Estimate (2021): 158 (+1.9%)
- Time zone: UTC+3 (MSK)
- Postal code: 363128
- OKTMO ID: 90640415101

Dargavs (Iron Ossetic: Дæргъæвс, Dærğævs) is a settlement in Prigorodny District of the Republic of North Ossetia–Alania, Russia, located on the Gizeldon River. Dargavs was a center of the Ossetian province of Tagauria.

== City of the Dead ==
There is a late medieval necropolis outside the village of Dargavs called the "City of the Dead" (Город мёртвых). It comprises 99 different tombs and crypts. Some sources say the oldest of the crypts dates back to the 12th century. In addition to the tombs, a tower stands at the back of the burial complex.

=== Architecture ===
The crypts have ridged curved roofs which rise in step-like fashion to a pointed peak at their center. The smaller crypts have flat sides at the front and back and curve inwards on the sides while the very smallest have no roofs whatsoever.

The walls are made of stone blocks and mortared with most likely lime or clay-lime. In the walls are square holes to place the dead bodies in the crypt.

On the inside of the crypts there is a pointed groin vault complex supporting the roof, though on the smaller ones these are pointed barrel vaults. The bigger crypts can be 2–4 stories high.

On the bank of the Uallagdon river near the crypts stands the Mamsurov tower at 16 meters high, built by Ingush tower builders Dugo Akhriev and Khazbi Tsurov.

=== Placement and position of buildings ===
The placement and "plan" of the site is very similar to the necropolis at Itum-Kali, where the tombs and crypts are placed closely together on hills or mountainsides, although some crypts are located further apart.

At the highest point, or at least higher up than the rest of the buildings, a tower is always built to watch over the dead. The crypts climb the mountainside in a row, with some of them built into the mountainside itself.

=== Old traditions and burials ===
Archaeological excavation has shown that people of the neighboring villages often buried their family in small wooden "boats". As there are no navigable rivers nearby, it is thought that this custom was meant to enable the souls of the departed to cross a wide river which they would face after death. The dead would be buried along with some of their belongings.

The grounds near the complex are scattered with coins. Ossetians would throw a coin for a dead family member from the hill and if it hit a stone, it was believed that this indicated the soul of the deceased had reached heaven. This could also be done in the small wells that are in front of every crypt.

=== Myths and legends ===
There are several myths connected with the cemetery, one being that any man who dared to walk in would never come out alive. This is one of the reasons why the locals almost never go there.

== Tourism ==
The place is a popular tourist destination, close to other sites of interest like the Midagrabin Waterfalls farther south. To reach Dargavs, it takes about one hour from Vladikavkaz on narrow roads across many hills.

== Gallery ==
Scenes from the Dargavs
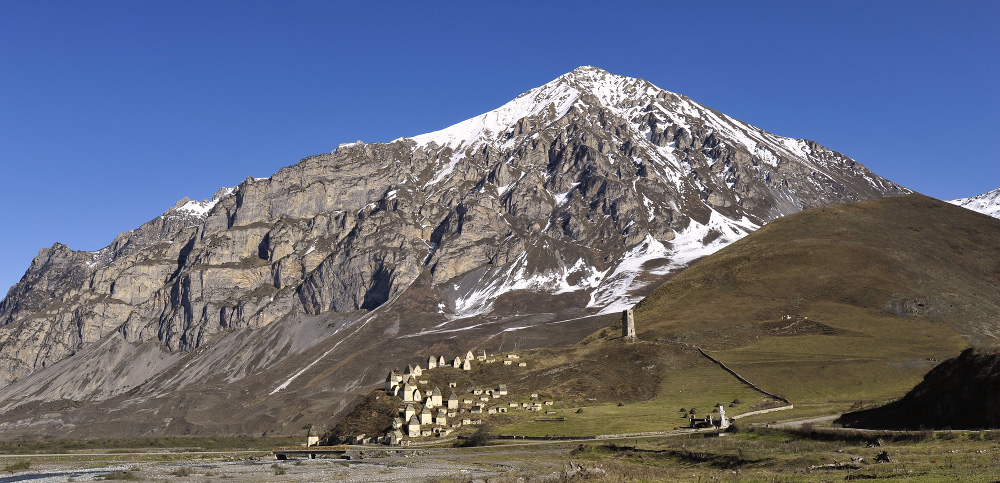

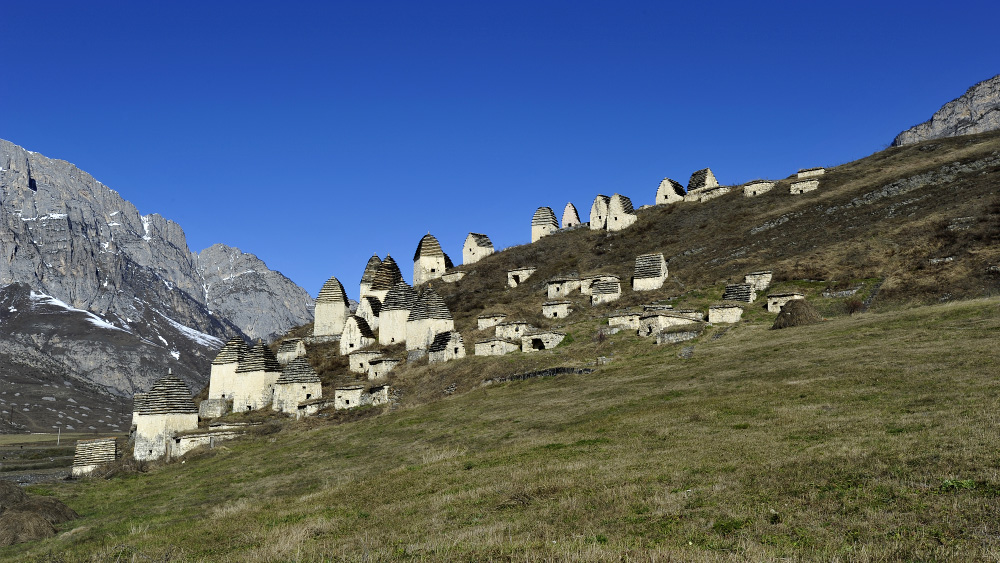

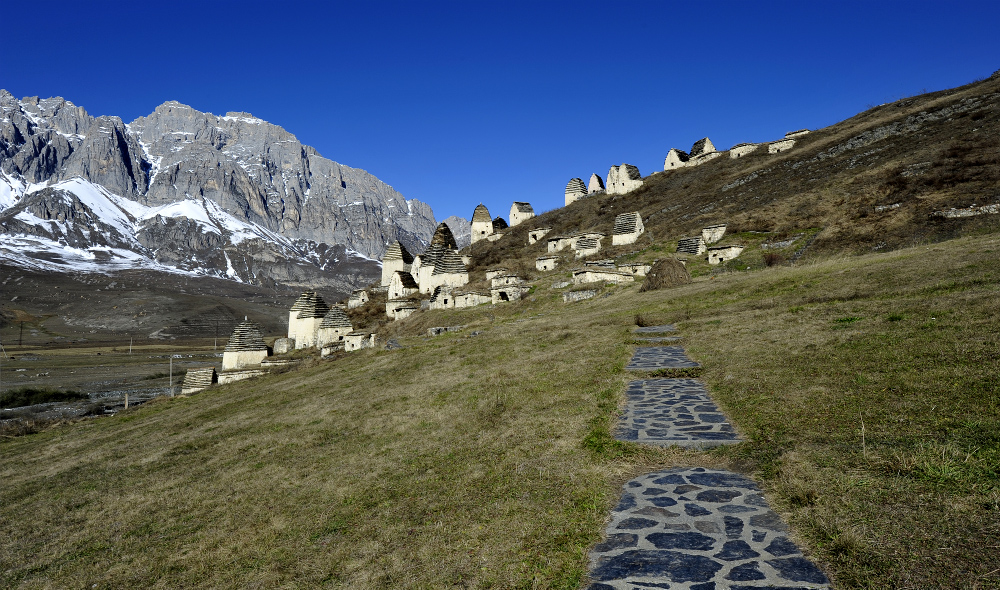

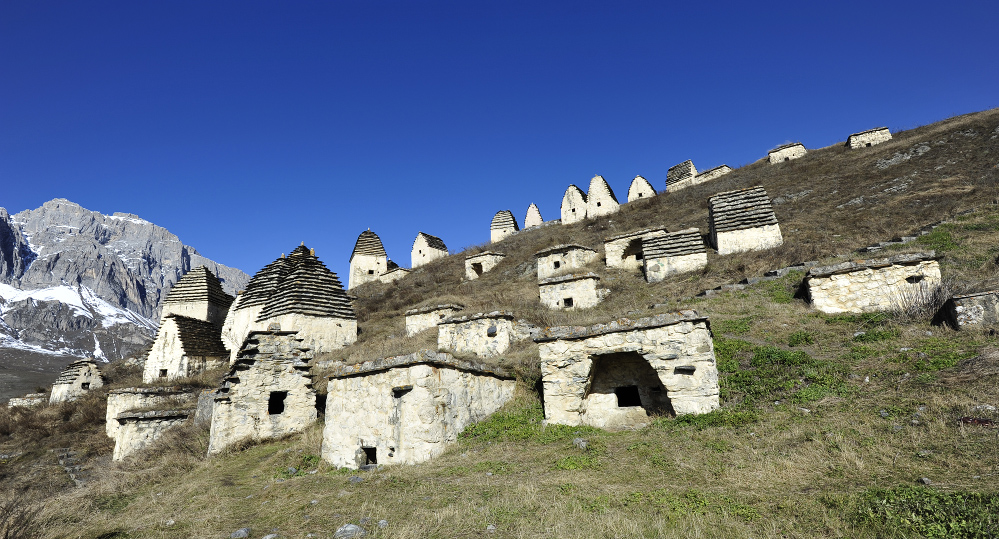

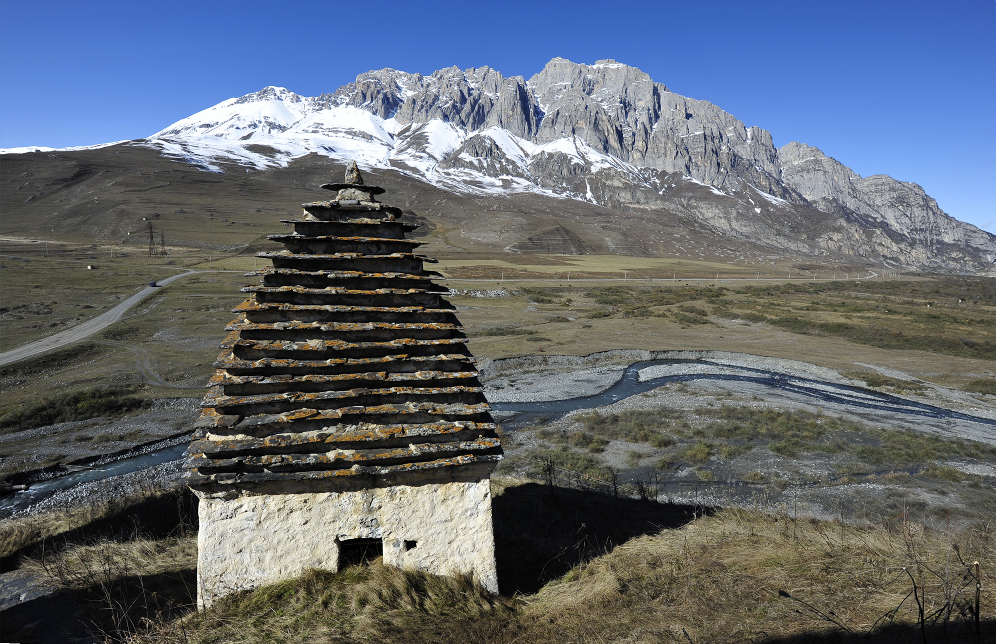

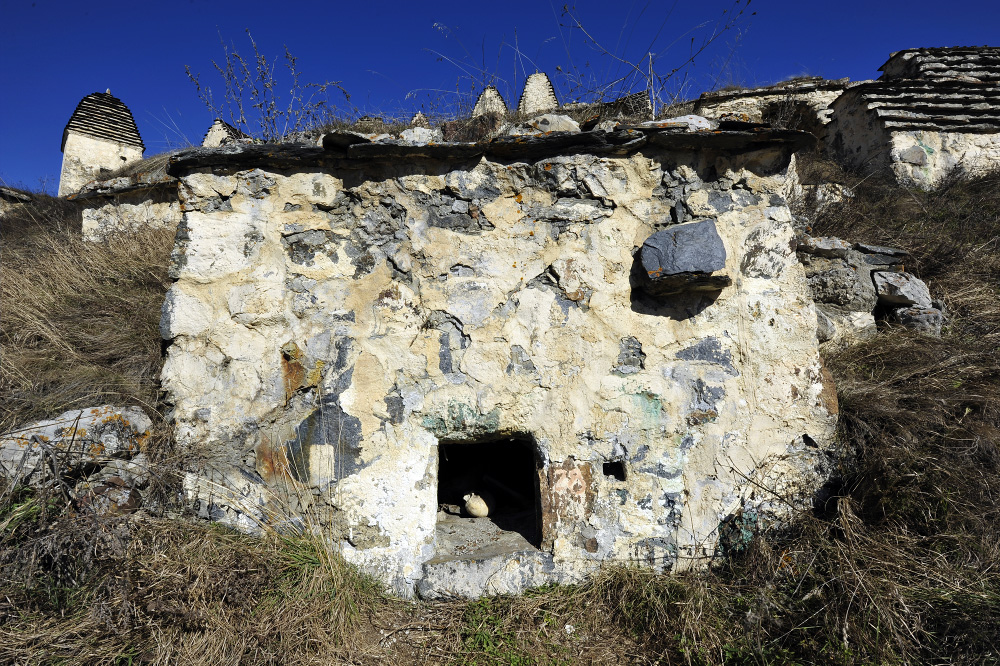

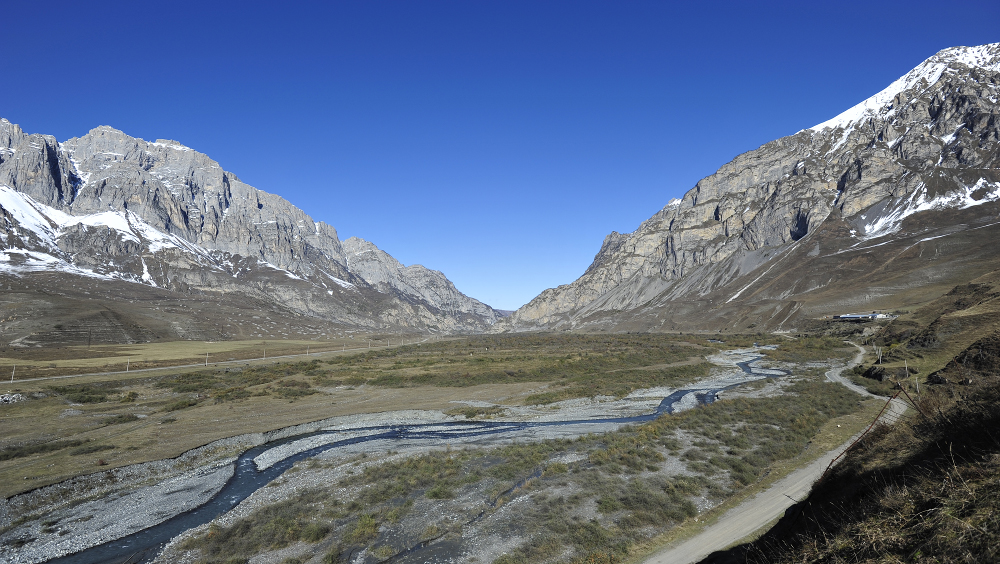

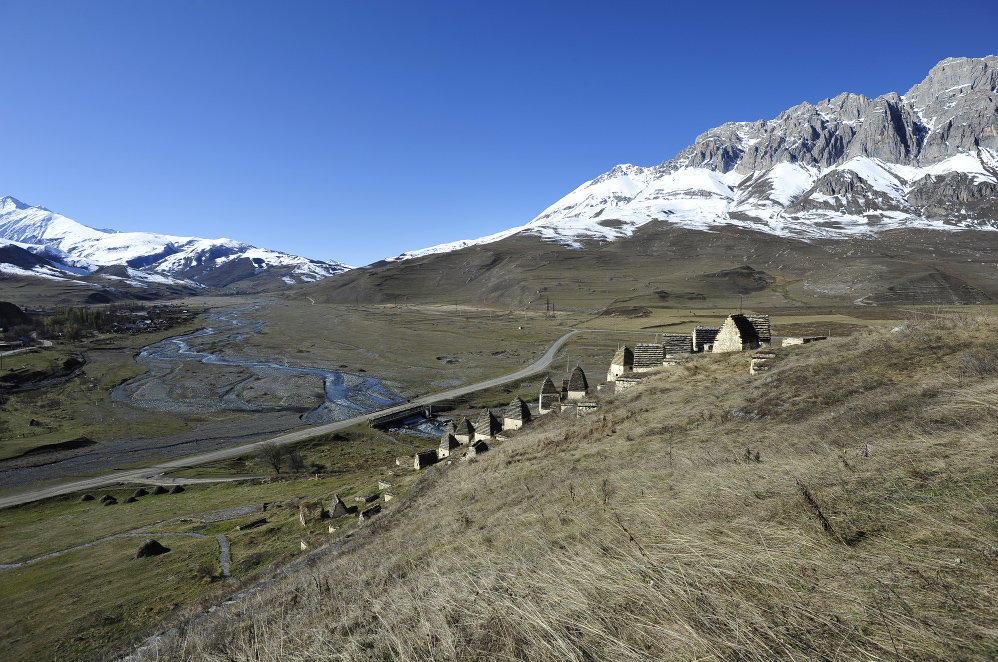

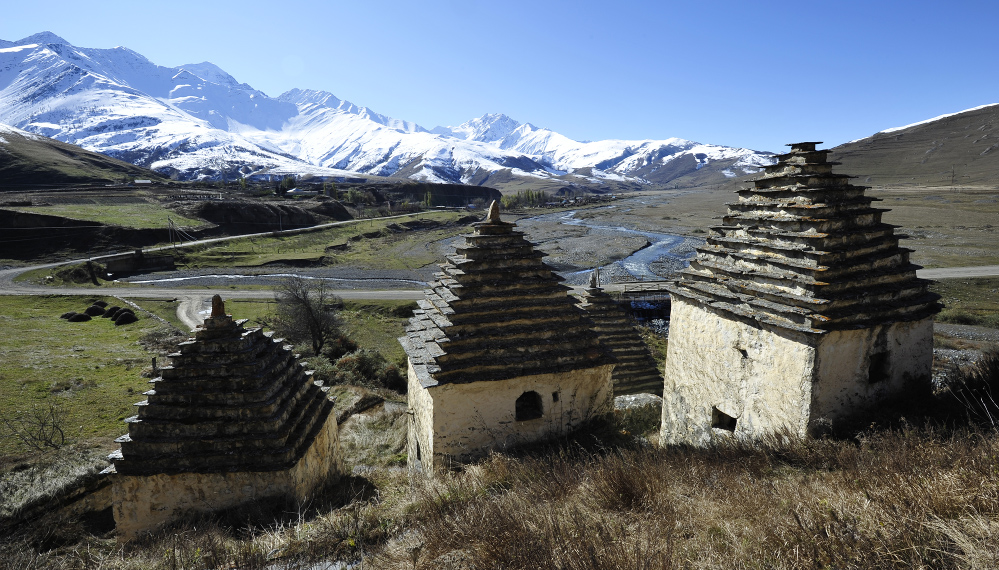

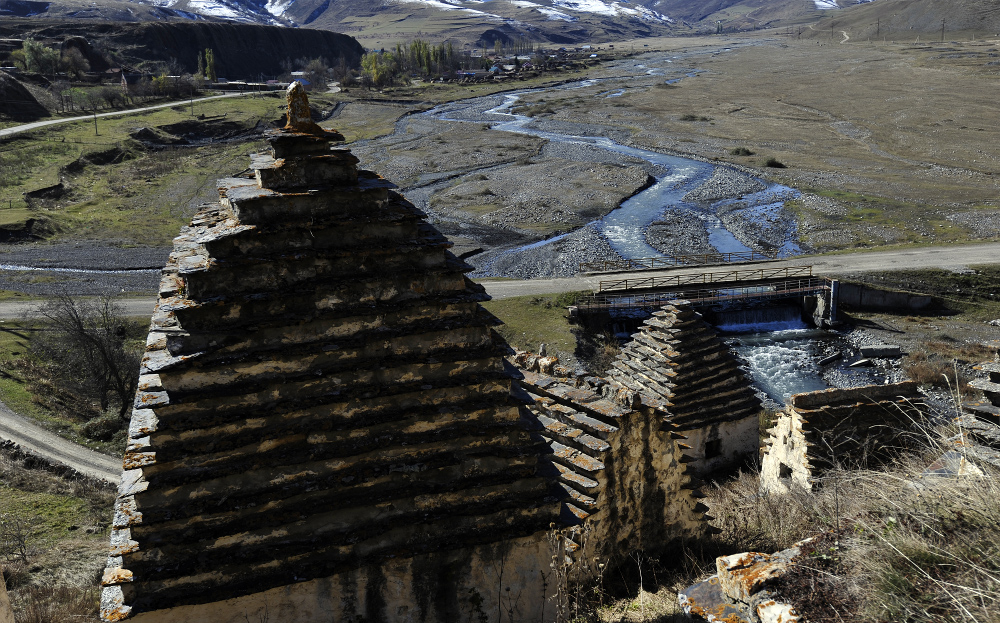

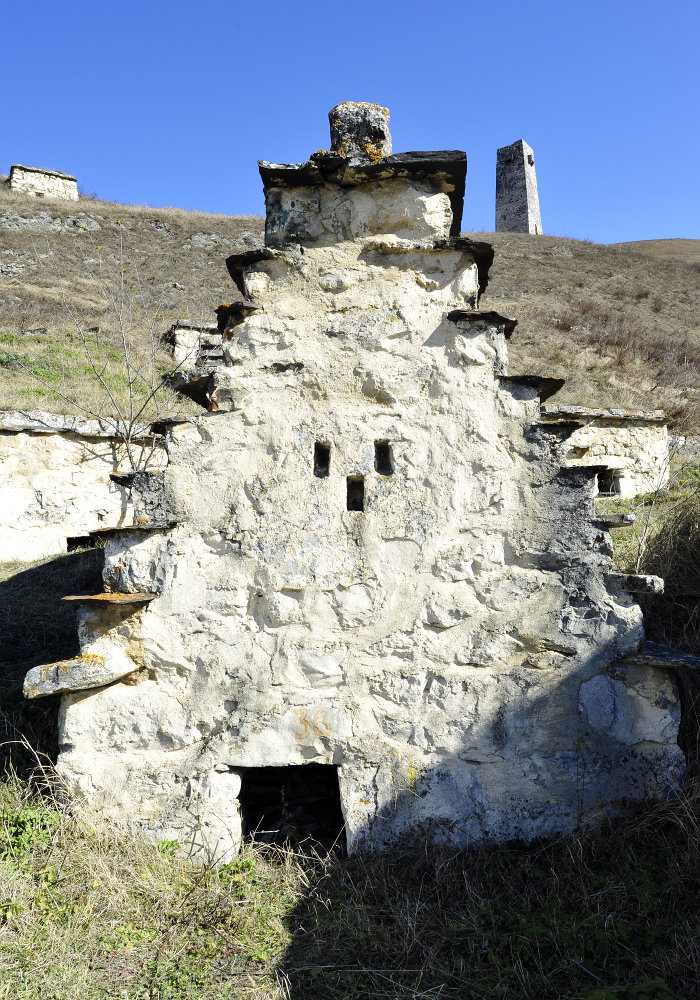

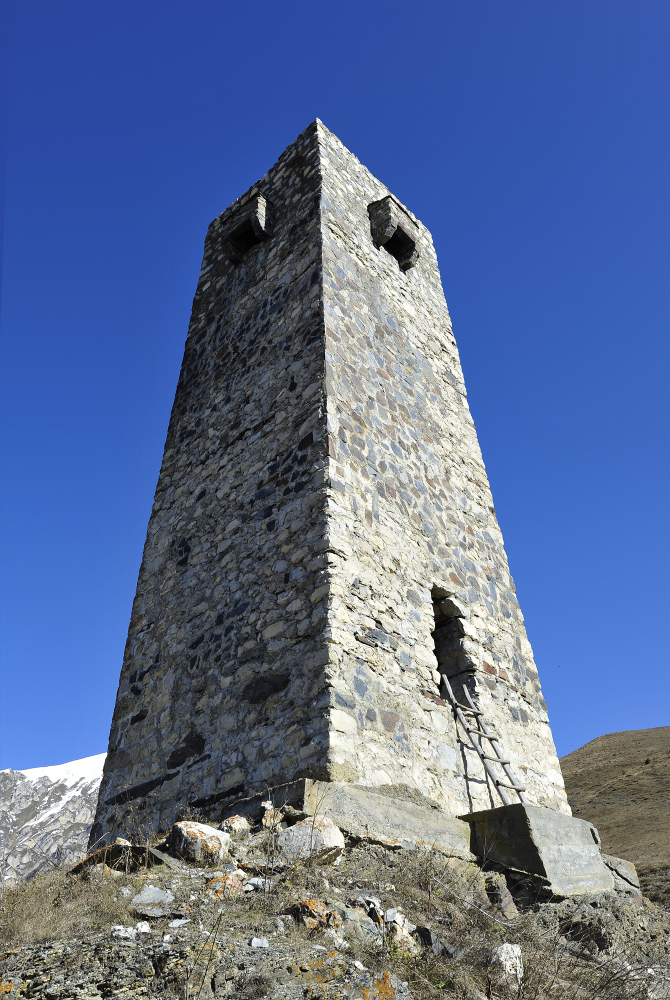

== See also ==
- Mutso
- Shatili

== Bibliography ==
- Gabisov, B. (1992). Чеченцы ингуши. Проблемы происхождения [Chechens and Ingush. Problems of origin] (in Russian). Grozny: Книга. p. 128. ISBN 5-7666-0569-2.
