= Yeleazar Meletinsky =

Russian scholar (1918–2005)

Eleazar Moiseevich Meletinskii (also Meletinsky or Meletinskij; Russian: Елеаза́р Моисе́евич Мелети́нский; 22 October 1918, Kharkiv – 17 December 2005, Moscow) was a Russian scholar famous for his seminal studies of folklore, literature, philology and the history and theory of narrative; he was one of the major figures of Russian academia in those fields.

He was Director of the Institute for Advanced Studies in the Humanities at Russian State University for the Humanities for several years until his death.

== His analysis of comic doublets ==
The traditions of the mythological narration, dealt with the figures of the ancestors-heroes civilizers, and their comic-demoniac doublets. Bakhtin summarized Meletinsky's analysis in his work on Rabelais:

This double aspect of the world and of human life [the existence of a second world and life outside officialdom] existed even at the earliest stages of cultural development, in the folklore of primitive peoples. Coupled with the cults which were serious in tone and organization were other, comic cults which laughed and scoffed at the deity ("ritual laughter"); coupled with serious myths were comic and abusive ones; coupled with heroes were their parodies and doublets. These comic rituals and myths have attracted the attention of folklorists.

Meletinsky also cites Frejdenberg 's analysis of the comic alter egos of the heroes.

In a class-based society, ritual laughter in popular culture creates an anti-clerical world of feasts, playful parody, and carnivals.

Hermes is a deified trickster, and Ulysses, the main character of the Odyssey, has a matrilinear descent from Hermes. In the Legendary Troy the mythological element also includes comic moments.

== Origins of Heroic Epic ==
In his 1963 work "Origins of Heroic Epic: early forms and archaic monuments", Meletinsky studied and compared elements of four ancient civilizations: Karelian-Finnish (pp. 95–155), Caucasian (156-246), Turkic-Mongolian (247-374) and Sumerian-Akkadian (375-422). Here the author examines very ancient myths and their role in the formation of the archaic epic. Among the discussed ones is the Alpamysh, ancient Turkic epic.

Meletinskii also makes an interesting analysis of comic doublets (particularly in "Primary sources epic" pp. 55–58, bibliography included).

The book also contains a bibliography (pp. 449–459), Primary sources epic (21-94).

== List of works ==
- 1963, Proiskhozhdenie geroicheskogo éposa. Rannie formy i arkhaicheskie pamiatniki (meaning "The origins of the heroic epic: early forms and archaic monuments"). Moscow. (462 pages) ISBN 5-02-018476-4 (in Russian)
- 1964 Primitive heritage in archaic epics, Reports of the International Congress of anthropological and ethnological sciences, Moscou : Nauka.
- 1976, Poetika Mifa
- 1977 Mif i istoricheskaia poetika folklora (Mythe et la poétique historique du folklore), Moscou : Nauka.
- 1986, Vvedenie v istoričeskuû poétiku éposa i romana. Moscow, Nauka.(in Russian)
  - Introduzione alla poetica storica dell'epos e del romanzo (1993) (in Italian)
- Dostoevskii v Svete Istoricheskoi Poetiki;
- 1996, MELETINSKY E. M. (1) ; BELMONT N. La poétique historique du folklore narratif (The historic poetry of folklore narratives); journal: Ethnologie française ISSN 0046-2616; 1996, vol. 26, no 4, pp. 573–747 (dissem.), pp. 611–618 (in French)
- Kak Sdelany “Brat’ia Karamazovy (1996)
- 1998, E.M. Meletinskii. Izbrannye Stat’i. Vospominaniia
- 2000, The Poetics of Myth translated by Guy Lanoue and Alexandre Sadetsky
- 2001, Zametki o Tvorchestve Dostoevskogo

== See also ==
- Emil Draitser
