= Florus and Laurus =

Christian martyrs

Saint Florus and Laurus
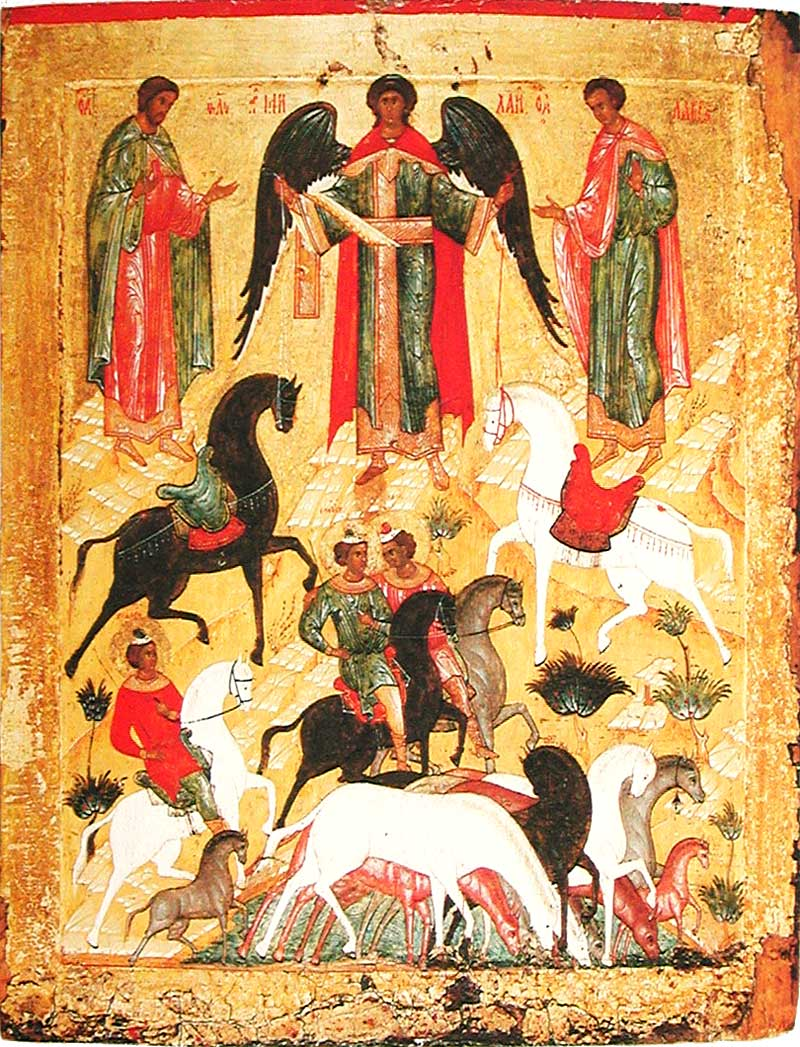
- A 15th-century Novgorod icon of Sts. Florus and Laurus

Martyrs
- Born: Byzantium
- Died: Illyricum
- Venerated in: Eastern Orthodox Church, Roman Catholic Church
- Feast: August 18

Saints Florus and Laurus are venerated as Christian martyrs of the 2nd century. According to a Greek tale, they were twin brothers who worked as stonemasons. They were originally from Byzantium but settled in Ulpiana, Dardania, south of modern Pristina, Kosovo in the district of Illyricum. They were educated in the art of masonry by two men named Maximus and Proculus, who were Christians.

According to their legend, Likaion, the prefect of Illyricum, employed the brothers in the construction of a pagan temple. The brothers gave their salaries to the poor. When the son of a local pagan priest named Mamertin was injured by a chip of stone from the saints' temple, Florus and Laurus cured the boy after the boy converted to Christianity. Mamertin also decided to convert to Christianity as a result of his son's recovery.

After the temple was built, Florus and Laurus brought together many local Christians there. The group smashed all of the statues of the pagan gods, and a cross was set up in the temple.

The Christians spent the whole night in prayer in the converted temple. As a result of this action, the local authorities had 300 Christians, including Mamertin and Mamertin's son, burned to death.

Florus and Laurus were executed in a different manner; Likaion had them thrown down an empty well. The well was covered over with earth.

== Veneration ==
The relics are said to have been found incorruptible. It was on the very same day that a severe horse plague came to an end, which led to the martyrs' association with horses. The relics were translated to Constantinople. The existence of the relics in Constantinople is testified by an account of a pilgrim from Novgorod named Anthony, who saw them in 1200, while Stephen of Novgorod saw the heads of the two martyrs in 1350 at the Pantokrator Monastery.

Sts. Florus and Laurus have been considered the patrons of horses in Rus and Ukraine. They have been shown on icons with horses around them. Florivsky Monastery in Kyiv and many Orthodox churches have been dedicated to the martyr twins. Peasants didn't plough with horses on their feast day for fear of causing a cattle plague. "On this day the Russians lead their horses round the church of their village" (The Golden Bough).

== Other twin martyrs ==
- Saints Cosmas and Damian
- Gervasius and Protasius
- Boris and Gleb
