= Maia (Roman goddess) =

Roman earth goddess and mother of Mercury

- Earth Goddess
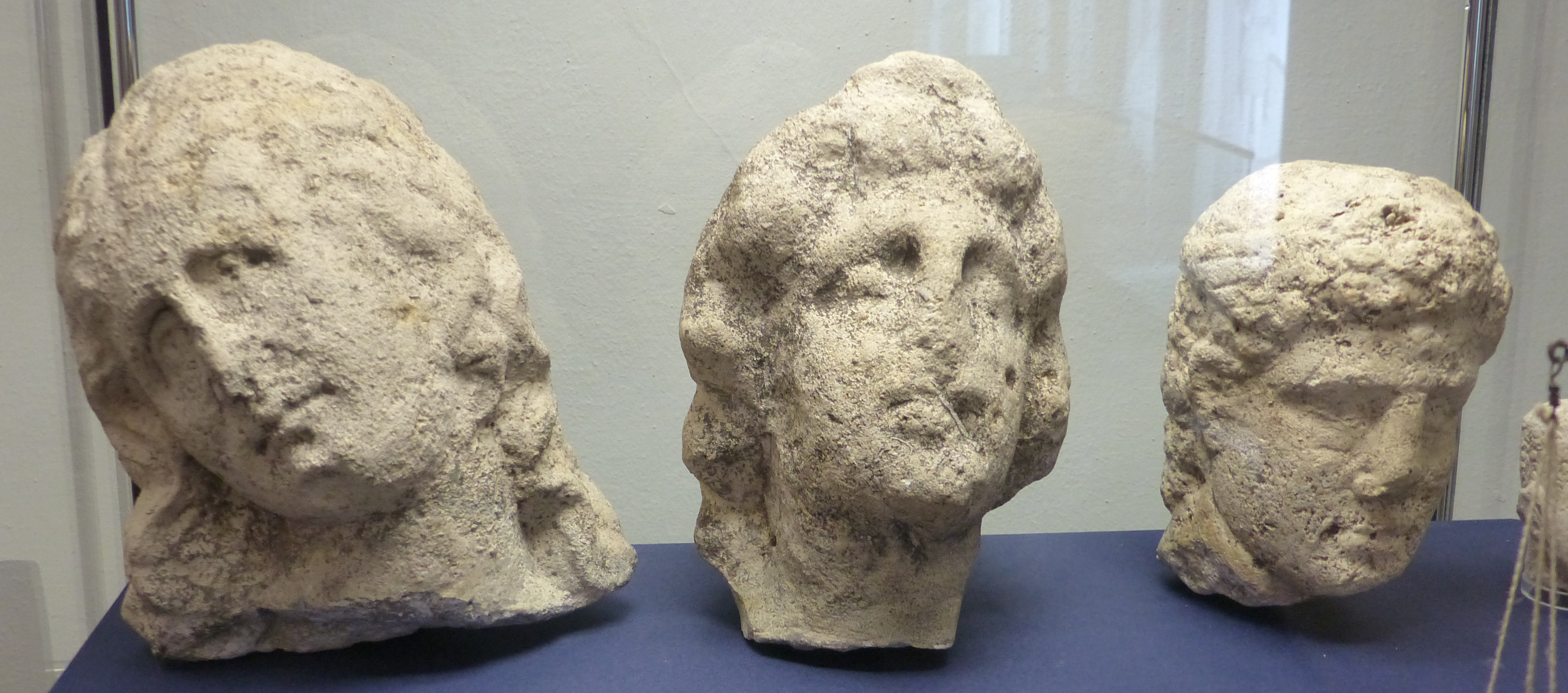
- The heads of Rosmerta, Maia, and Mercury, dated to the 3rd century AD
- Major cult center: Pompeii
- Day: May 1
- Festivals: Vulcanalia

Genealogy
- Consort: Vulcan
- Children: Mercury

Equivalents
- Greek: Maia

In ancient Roman mythology and religion, Maia (Latin: Maia), or Maiae, was an earth goddess, a consort and paredrae of Vulcan, and the mother of Mercury. While Maia was originally an ancient Italic goddess, she was conflated with the Greek goddess Maia after the Hellenization of Latin culture, and absorbed much of her mythology.

== Functions ==
Maia was originally an Italic deity— likely a goddess of spring— who was later adopted by the Romans. After her conflation with the Greek goddess Maia, Zeus' lover and mother of Hermes, she became the daughter of the Titan Atlas and the mother of the god Mercury by Jupiter. Her exact functions as a goddess are unclear. She possibly embodied the concept of growth, as her name was thought to be related to maius, meaning "larger," or "greater." She may have also abstractly embodied the concept of maiestas: the "majesty" of the Roman people.

In an archaic Roman invocational prayer, Maia was named as an attribute of Vulcan, with Gellius comparing their relationship to those of Salacia and Neptune and Lua and Saturn. The female deities named in the list embodied an aspect of their male counterparts' functionality. Maia was additionally associated and theologically intertwined with the Roman goddesses Terra, Fauna, Ops, Juno, Cybele, and Bona Dea. Her associations with the earth goddesses Fauna and Ops were likely influenced by the scholar Varro, who claimed multiple goddesses were derivatives of an original earth goddess: Terra. The association with Juno, whose Etruscan counterpart was the goddess Uni, is suggested by the inscription Uni Mae on the Piacenza Liver.

In the Roman provinces of Gallica Belgia and Germania, Maia was depicted alongside Mercury and his consort: the Gallic goddess Rosmerta. There, both goddesses were associated with fertility and the season of spring. Maia was occasionally depicted holding a caduceus, therefore associating her with her son's healing abilities.

== Worship ==
=== Worship in August ===
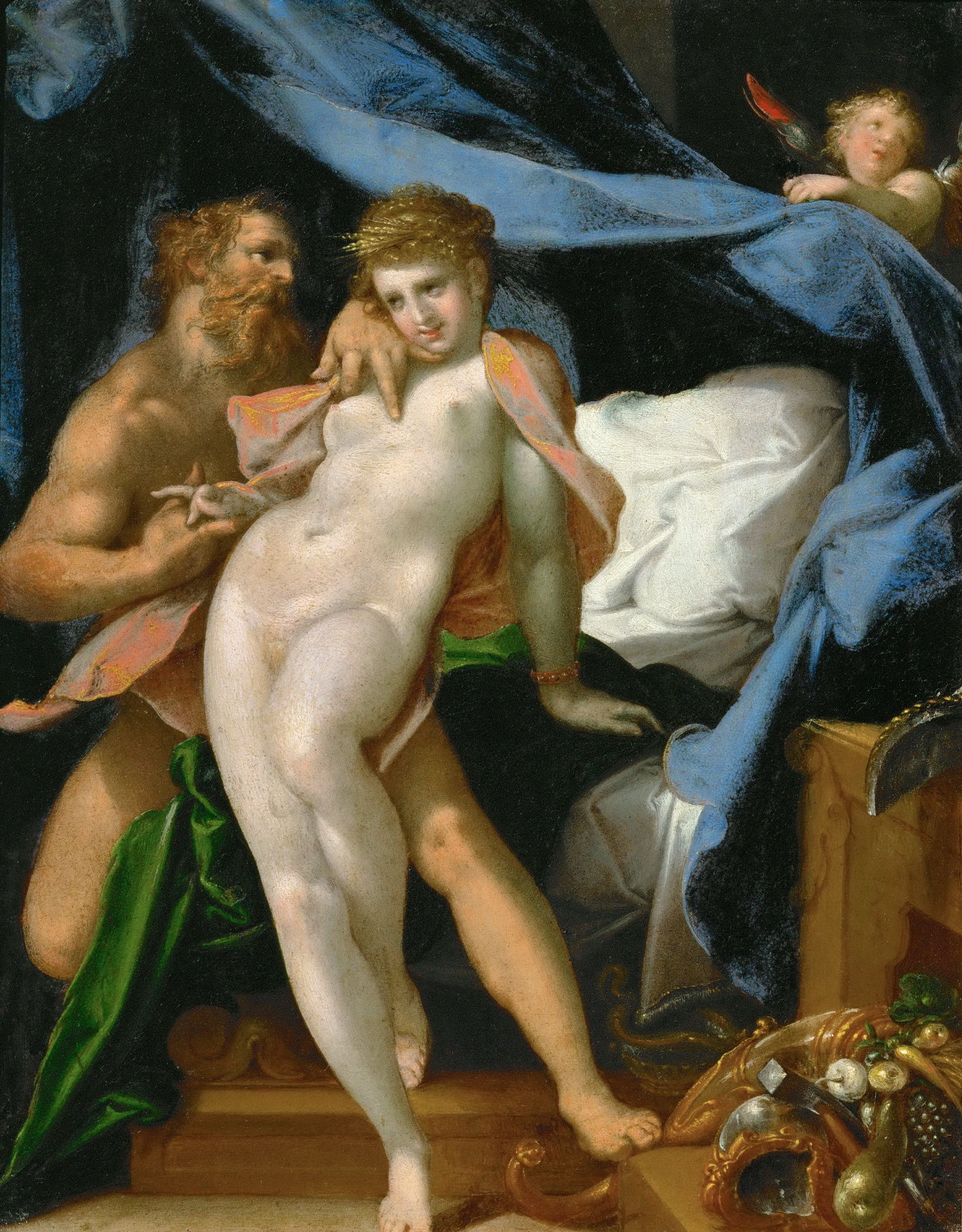
Vulcan and Maia, 1585 oil painting by Bartholomeus Spranger.

Maia was closely associated with Vulcan, god of volcanoes and metalsmithing, and was occasionally referred to as Maia Volcani. Maia Volcani was an iteration of the goddess capable of destroying and purifying enemy weapons, similarly to Lua Saturni. They were celebrated at the area Volcani, an ancient cultic site located at the foot of the Capitolium in the northwestern corner of the Roman Forum, and the location of the Vulcanal. The annual Vulcanalia festival was held at the site on August 23rd. Maia was also worshipped during this festival, as Maiae supra comitium ("Maia above Comitium") was recorded on the Fasti Antiates and Fasti Arvalium calendars as being worshipped on the 23rd.

=== Worship in May ===
The month of May (Maius in Latin) was potentially named after Maia; however, ancient etymologists also connected it to the maiores "ancestors," again from the adjective maius ("greater"). The Kalends of May (May 1st), was sacred to Maia. Annually, a pregnant sow was sacrificed to the goddess by one of Vulcan's flamens, a sacrifice Macrobius claimed was suitable for an earth goddess. The month was also sacred to her son Mercury, and merchants made sacrifices to him on the Ides of May (May 15th).

== Cults and temples ==
Maia and Mercury had cult centers at Delos and the city of Pompeii. At Pompeii, they were worshipped by a college of priests (sodalitas) known as the ministri Mercuii Maiae. Later, in 14 CE, the names of the divinities were dropped and the sect became the Sodales Augustales, who attended to the cult of Augustus and the Julii.

Cornelius Lebeo stated that a temple on the Aventine Hill was dedicated to Maia under the name of Bona Dea, dedicated on the Kalends of May.

== See also ==
- Bona Dea
- Ops
- Terra
- Rosmerta
