= Vulcan (mythology) =

Ancient Roman god of fire, volcanoes, and metalworking

- God of fire, metalworking, and the forge
- Member of the Dii Consentes
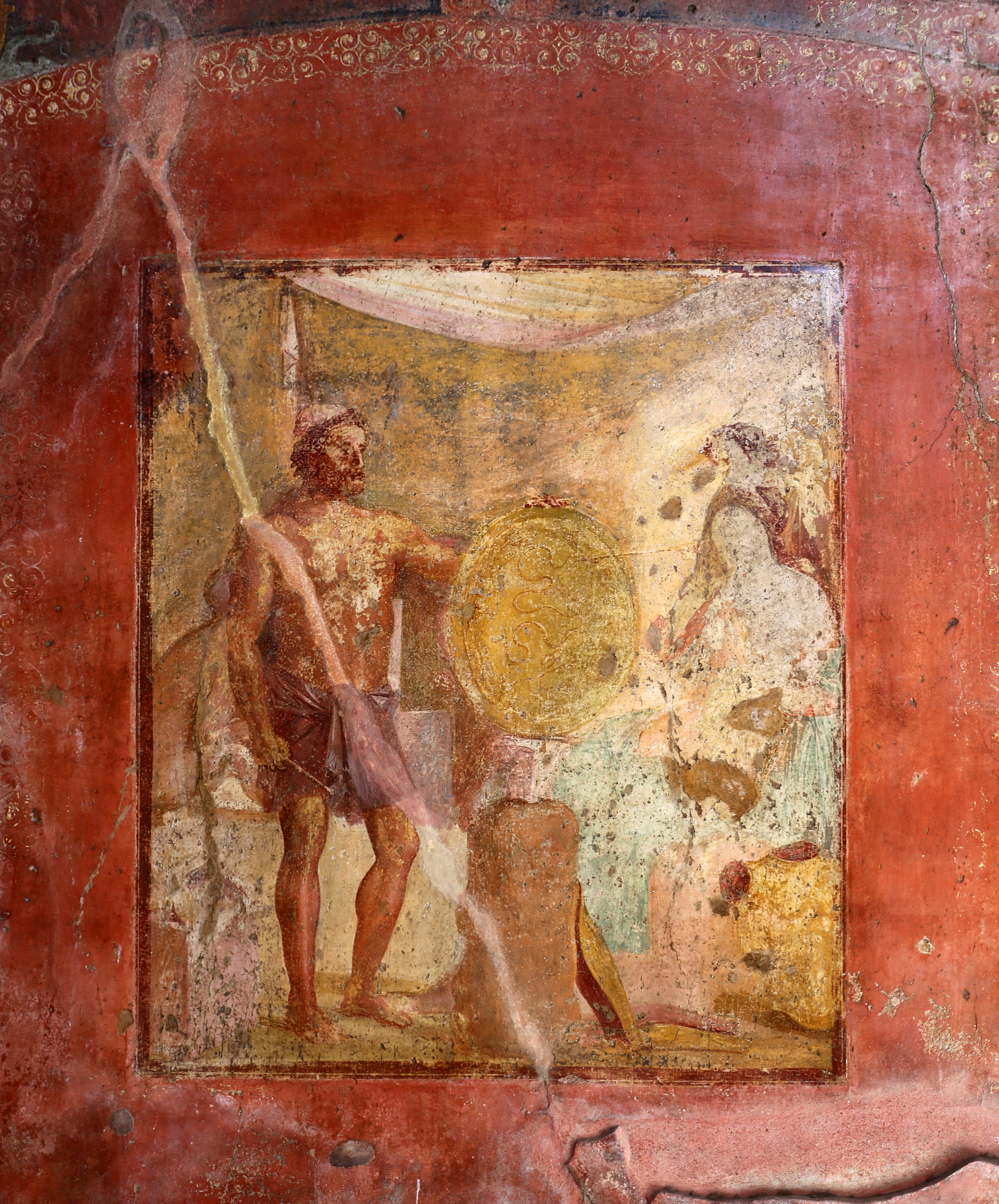
- A fresco of Vulcan-Hephaestus in Pompeii
- Abode: under the island of Vulcano
- Symbol: Blacksmith's hammer
- Temples: Vulcanal
- Festivals: the Vulcanalia

Genealogy
- Parents: Jupiter and Juno
- Siblings: Mars, Minerva, Hercules, Bellona, Apollo, Diana, Bacchus, etc.
- Consort: Venus

Equivalents
- Etruscan: Sethlans
- Greek: Hephaestus

Vulcan (Latin: Vulcanus, in archaically retained spelling also Volcanus, both pronounced [wʊɫˈkaːnʊs]) is the god of fire including the fire of volcanoes, deserts, metalworking and the forge in ancient Roman religion and myth. He is often depicted with a blacksmith's hammer. The Vulcanalia was the annual festival held August 23 in his honor. His Greek counterpart is Hephaestus, the god of fire and smithery. In Etruscan religion, he is identified with Sethlans.

Vulcan belongs to the most ancient stage of Roman religion: Varro, the ancient Roman scholar and writer, citing the Annales Maximi, records that king Titus Tatius dedicated altars to a series of deities including Vulcan.

== Etymology ==
The origin of the name is unclear. Roman tradition maintained that it was related to Latin words connected to lightning (fulgur, fulgere, fulmen), which in turn was thought of as related to flames. This interpretation is supported by Walter William Skeat in his etymological dictionary as meaning lustre.

It has been supposed that his name was not Latin but related to that of the Cretan god Velchanos, a god of nature and the nether world. Wolfgang Meid has disputed this identification as fantastic. Meid and Vasily Abaev have proposed on their side a matching theonym in the Ossetic legendary smith of the Nart saga Kurd-Alä-Wärgon ("the Alan smith Wärgon"), and postulated an original PIE smith god named *wl̩kānos. But since the name in its normal form is stable and has a clear meaning—kurd ("smith") + Alaeg (the name of one of the Nartic families)+ on ("of the family")—this hypothesis has been considered unacceptable by Dumezil.

Christian-Joseph Guyonvarc'h has proposed the identification with the Irish name Olcan (Ogamic Ulccagni, in the genitive). Gérard Capdeville finds a continuity between Cretan Minoan god Velchanos and Etruscan Velchans. The Minoan god's identity would be that of a young deity, master of fire and companion of the Great Goddess.

According to Martin L. West, Volcanus may represent a god of the fire named *Volca and attached to the suffix -no-, the typical appendage indicating the god's domain in Indo-European languages. *Volca could therefore be a cognate of the Sanskrit words ulkā (उल्का) ("flame, meteor, firebrand") and/or várcas- ("brilliance, glare").

== Worship ==
Vulcan's oldest shrine in Rome, called the Vulcanal, was situated at the foot of the Capitoline in the Forum Romanum, and was reputed to date to the archaic period of the kings of Rome, and to have been established on the site by Titus Tatius, the Sabine co-king, with a traditional date in the 8th century BC. It was the view of the Etruscan haruspices that a temple of Vulcan should be located outside the city, and the Vulcanal may originally have been on or outside the city limits before they expanded to include the Capitoline Hill. The Volcanalia sacrifice was offered here to Vulcan, on August 23. Vulcan also had a temple on the Campus Martius, which was in existence by 214 BC.

The Romans identified Vulcan with the Greek smith-god Hephaestus. Vulcan became associated like his Greek counterpart with the constructive use of fire in metalworking. A fragment of a Greek pot showing Hephaestus found at the Volcanal has been dated to the 6th century BC, suggesting that the two gods were already associated at this date. However, Vulcan had a stronger association than Hephaestus with fire's destructive capacity, and a major concern of his worshippers was to encourage the god to avert harmful fires.

Vulcanalia
- Observed by: Ancient Rome
- Type: Roman, Historical
- Celebrations: Bonfires in honour of Vulcan
- Observances: Sacrifice of fish
- Date: August 23rd

The festival of Vulcan, the Vulcanalia, was celebrated on August 23 each year, when the summer heat placed crops and granaries most at risk of burning. During the festival, bonfires were created in honour of the god, into which live fish or small animals were thrown as a sacrifice, to be consumed in the place of humans.

The Vulcanalia was part of the cycle of the four festivities of the second half of August (Consualia on August 21, Vulcanalia on 23, Opiconsivia on 25 and Vulturnalia on 27) related to the agrarian activities of that month and in symmetric correlation with those of the second half of July (Lucaria on July 19 and 21, Neptunalia on 23 and Furrinalia on 25). While the festivals of July dealt with untamed nature (woods) and waters (superficial waters the Neptunalia and underground waters the Furrinalia) at a time of danger caused by their relative deficiency, those of August were devoted to the results of human endeavour on nature with the storing of harvested grain (Consualia) and their relationship to human society and regality (Opiconsivia) which at that time were at risk and required protection from the dangers of the excessive strength of the two elements of fire (Vulcanalia) and wind (Vulturnalia) reinforced by dryness.

It is recorded that during the Vulcanalia people used to hang their clothes and fabrics under the sun. This habit might reflect a theological connection between Vulcan and the divinized Sun.

Another custom observed on this day required that one should start working by the light of a candle, probably to propitiate a beneficial use of fire by the god. In addition to the Vulcanalia of August 23, the date of May 23, which was the second of the two annual Tubilustria or ceremonies for the purification of trumpets, was sacred to Vulcan.

The Ludi Vulcanalici, were held just once on August 23, 20 BC, within the temple precinct of Vulcan, and used by Augustus to mark the treaty with Parthia and the return of the legionary standards that had been lost at the Battle of Carrhae in 53 BC.

A flamen, one of the flamines minors, named flamen Vulcanalis was in charge of the cult of the god. The flamen Vulcanalis officiated at a sacrifice to the goddess Maia, held every year at the Kalendae of May.

Vulcan was among the gods placated after the Great Fire of Rome in AD 64. In response to the same fire, Domitian (emperor 81–96) established a new altar to Vulcan on the Quirinal Hill. At the same time a red bull-calf and red boar were added to the sacrifices made on the Vulcanalia, at least in that region of the city.

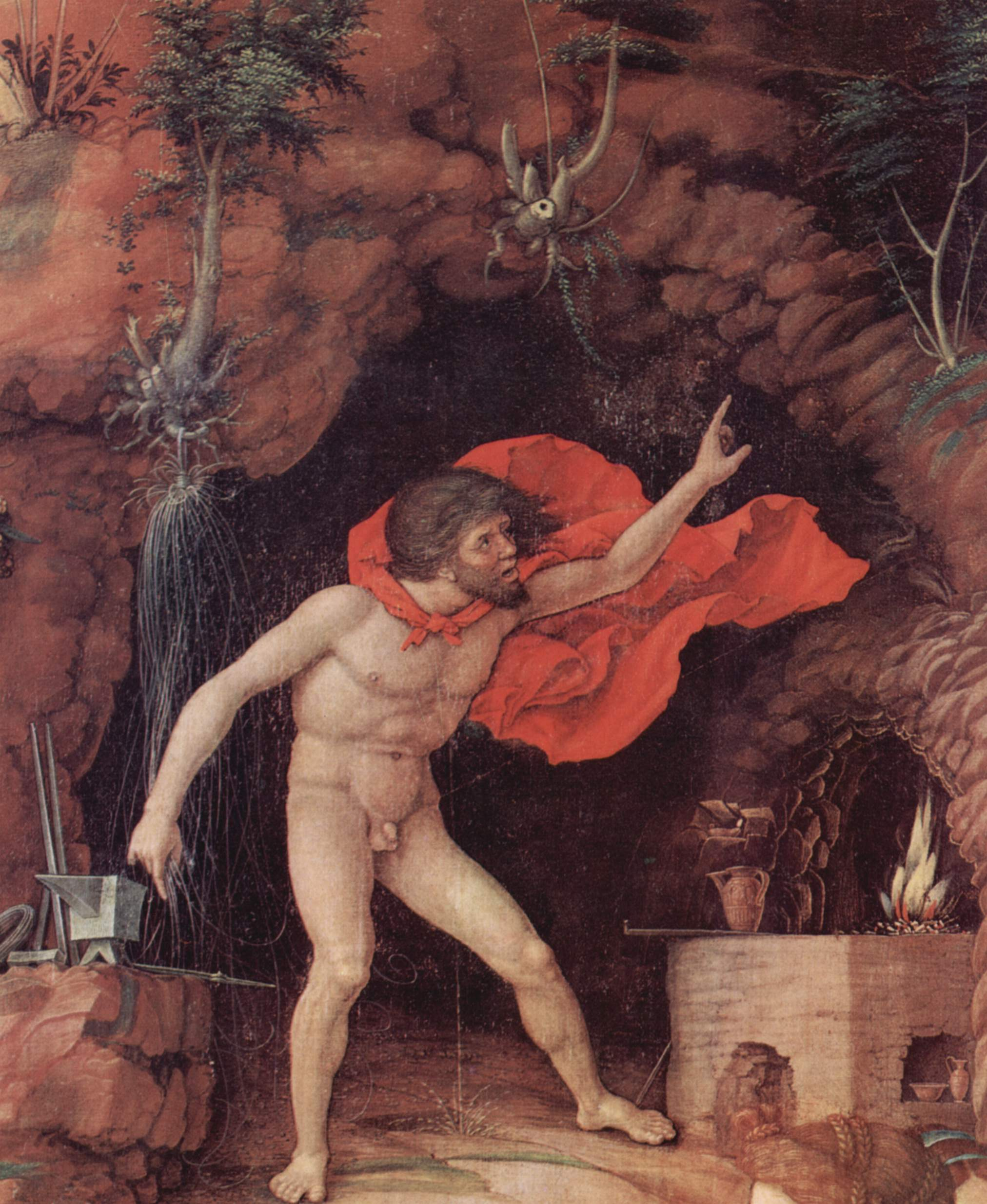
Andrea Mantegna: Parnassus (detail): Vulcan, god of fire (1497)

== Theology ==
The nature of Vulcan is connected with religious ideas concerning fire; the Roman concept of Vulcan seems to associate him to both the destructive and the fertilizing powers of fire.

In the first aspect, he is worshipped in the Volcanalia, to avert its potential danger to harvested wheat. His cult is located outside the boundaries of the original city to avoid the risk of fires caused by the god in the city itself. This power is, however, considered useful if directed against enemies and such a choice for the location of the god's cult could be interpreted in this way too. The same idea underlies the dedication of the arms of the defeated enemies, as well as those of the surviving general in a devotion ritual to the god.

Through comparative interpretation this aspect has been connected by Dumézil to the third or defensive fire in the theory of the three Vedic sacrificial fires. In such theory three fires are necessary to the discharge of a religious ceremony: the hearth of the landlord, which has the function of establishing a referential on Earth in that precise location connecting it with Heaven; the sacrificial fire, which conveys the offer to Heaven; and the defensive fire, which is usually located on the southern boundary of the sacred space and has a protective function against evil influences. Since the territory of the city of Rome was seen as a magnified temple in itself, the three fires should be identified as the hearth of the landlord in the temple of Vesta (aedes Vestae); the sacrificial fires of each temple, shrine or altar; and the defensive fire in the temple of Vulcan.

Another meaning of Vulcan is related to male fertilizing power. In various Latin and Roman legends he is the father of famous characters, such as the founder of Praeneste Caeculus, Cacus, a primordial being or king, later transformed into a monster that inhabited the site of the Aventine in Rome, and Roman king Servius Tullius. In a variant of the story of the birth of Romulus the details are identical even though Vulcan is not explicitly mentioned.

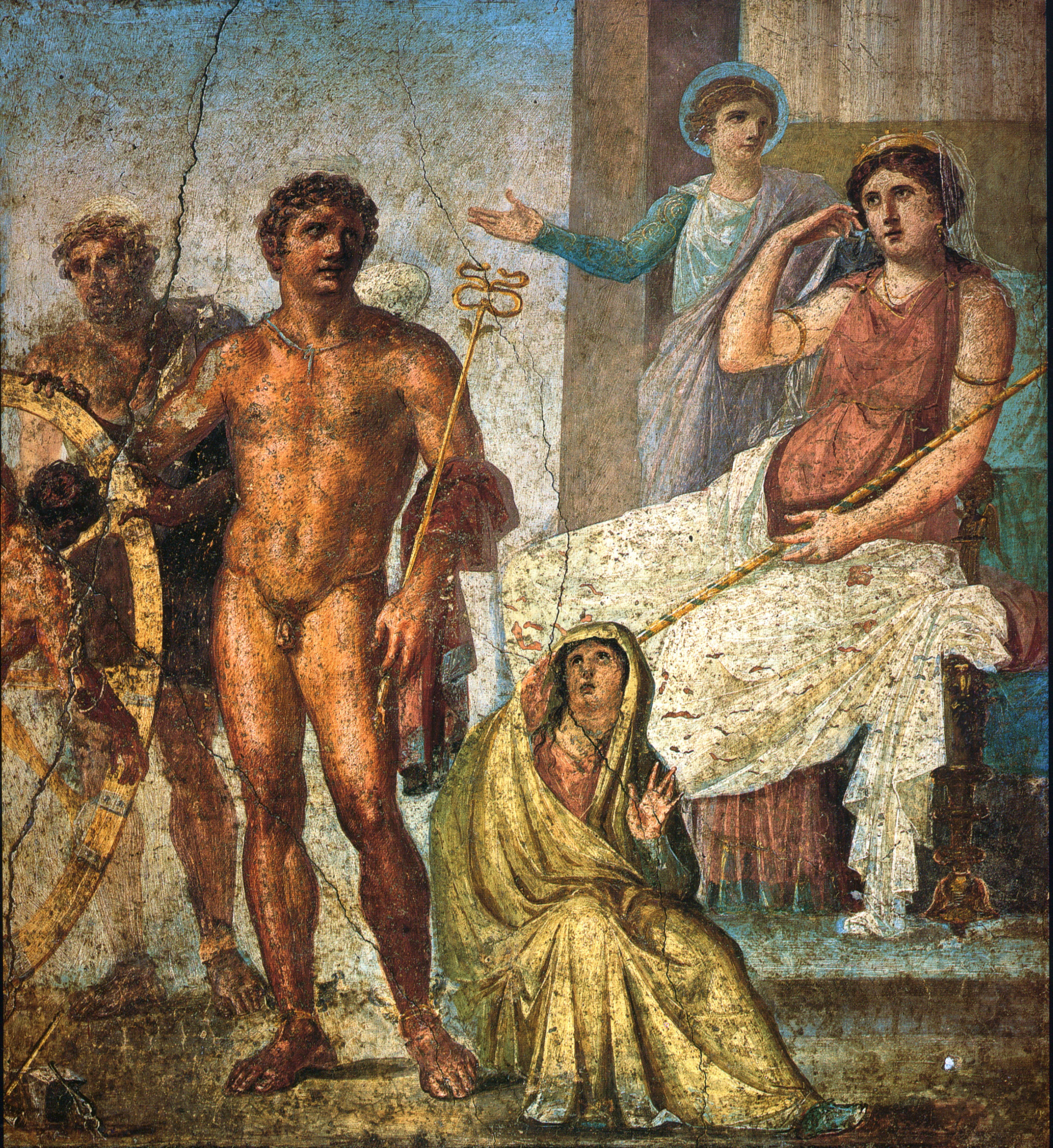
Punishment of Ixion: in the center is Mercury holding the caduceus and on the right Juno sits on her throne. Behind her Iris stands and gestures. On the left is Vulcanus (blond figure) standing behind the wheel, manning it, with Ixion already tied to it. Nephele sits at Mercury's feet; a Roman fresco from the eastern wall of the triclinium in the House of the Vettii, Pompeii, Fourth Style (60–79 AD).

Some scholars think that Vulcan might be the unknown god who impregnated goddesses Fortuna Primigenia at Praeneste and Feronia at Anxur. In this case, he would be the father of Jupiter. This view, however, is in conflict with that which links the goddess to Jupiter, as his daughter (puer Jovis) and his mother too, as primigenia, meaning "primordial".

In all of the above-mentioned stories, the god's fertilizing power is related to that of the fire of the house hearth. In the case of Caeculus, his mother was impregnated by a spark that dropped on her womb from the hearth while she was sitting nearby. Servius Tullius' mother Ocresia was impregnated by a male sex organ that miraculously appeared in the ashes of the sacrificial ara, at the order of Tanaquil, Tarquinius Priscus' wife. Pliny the Elder tells the same story, but states that the father was the Lar familiaris. The divinity of the child was recognized when his head was surrounded by flames and he remained unharmed.

Through the comparative analysis of these myths, archaeologist Andrea Carandini opines that Cacus and Caca were the sons of Vulcan and of a local divine being or a virgin as in the case of Caeculus. Cacus and Caca would represent the metallurgic and the domestic fire, projections of Vulcan and of Vesta.

These legends date back to the time of preurban Latium. Their meaning is quite clear: at the divine level Vulcan impregnates a virgin goddess and generates Jupiter, the king of the gods; at the human level he impregnates a local virgin (perhaps of royal descent) and generates a king.

The first mention of a ritual connection between Vulcan and Vesta is the lectisternium of 217 BC. Other facts that seem to hint at this connection are the relative proximity of the two sanctuaries and Dionysius of Halicarnassus' testimony that both cults had been introduced to Rome by Titus Tatius to comply with a vow he had made in battle. Varro confirms the fact.

Vulcan is related to two equally ancient female goddesses, Stata Mater, perhaps the goddess who stops fires and Maia.

Herbert Jennings Rose interprets Maia as a goddess related to growth by connecting her name with IE root *MAG. Macrobius relates Cincius' opinion that Vulcan's female companion is Maia. Cincius justifies his view on the grounds that the flamen Volcanalis sacrificed to her at the Kalendae of May. In Piso's view, the companion of the god is Maiestas.

According to Gellius as well, Maia was associated with Vulcan; and he backs up his view by quoting the ritual prayers in use by Roman priests.

Vulcan is the patron of trades related to ovens (cooks, bakers, confectioners) as attested in the works of Plautus, Apuleius (the god is the cook at the wedding of Cupid and Psyche) and in Vespa's short poem in the Latin Anthology about the litigation between a cook and a baker.

== Sons ==
According to Hyginus' Fabulae, the sons of Vulcan are Philammon, Cecrops, Erichthonius, Corynetes, Cercyon, Philottus, and Spinther. According to Hyginus' De astronomia, he also had a son named Olenus, who was the father of Helice and Aex, two nymphs who were nurses of Jove.

According to Virgil, Vulcan was the father of Caeculus.

== Hypothetical origin ==
The origin of the Roman god of fire Vulcan has been traced back to the Cretan god Velchanos by Gérard Capdeville, primarily under the suggestion of the close similarity of their names. Cretan Velchanos is a young god of Mediterranean or Near Eastern origin who has mastership of fire and is the companion of the Great Goddess. These traits are preserved in Latium only in his sons Cacus, Caeculus, and Servius Tullius. At Praeneste the uncles of Caeculus are known as Digiti, a noun that connects them to the Cretan Dactyli.

== Foundation of Rome ==
Velchanos was the supreme god of early Cretan religion, where the festival of the βελχάνια (Velchania) as well as a month Ϝελχάνιοσ (Welchanios) are attested: a gloss by Hesychius states that "Velchanos is Zeus among the Cretan". He was the first god of the cavern of Mount Ida, where he had an oracle, and was honoured also in Cyprus.

His name is very similar to that of Latin god Volcanus, who himself was considered to be the father of Caeculus and Servius Tullius, not to mention Romulus in the version transmitted by Promathion, which is very similar to the legend of Servius.

The founder of Rome has a close relationship with this god as he founded the Volcanal and there he dedicated a quadriga with his own statue after his first victory. It is there too that a part of the tradition locates the place of his death: the site was marked by the Lapis Niger: Festus writes "Niger lapis in Comitio locum funestum significat, ut ali, Romuli morti destinatum...". On the day of the Volcanalia (August 23) a sacrifice was offered to Hora Quirini, paredra of Quirinus with whom the deified Romulus was identified. As the Consualia were mentioned first in connection with the founding of Rome in the episode of the abduction of the Sabine women, as the Volcanalia are celebrated two days later and two days before the Opiconsivia, and as the name Volcanus resembles that of the ancient Cretan god honoured in the Βελχ?νια who presided over initiation rites, the Consualia must have a meaning of integration into the citizenship. This provides an explanation for the choice of the festival of the Parilia as the date of the foundation of Rome, since these are first of all the festival of the iuniores. Festus writes: "Parilibus Romulus Vrbem condidit, quem diem festum praecipue habebant iuniores." The date of April 21 marked the starting point of the process of initiation of the future new citizens which concluded four months later on the ceremony of the Consualia, which involves athletic games and marriages.

== Greek myths of Hephaestus ==
Through his identification with the Hephaestus of Greek mythology, Vulcan came to be considered as the manufacturer of art, arms, iron, jewelry, and armor for various gods and heroes, including the lightning bolts of Jupiter. He was the son of Jupiter and Juno, and the husband of Maia and Aphrodite (Venus). His smithy was believed to be situated underneath Mount Etna in Sicily.

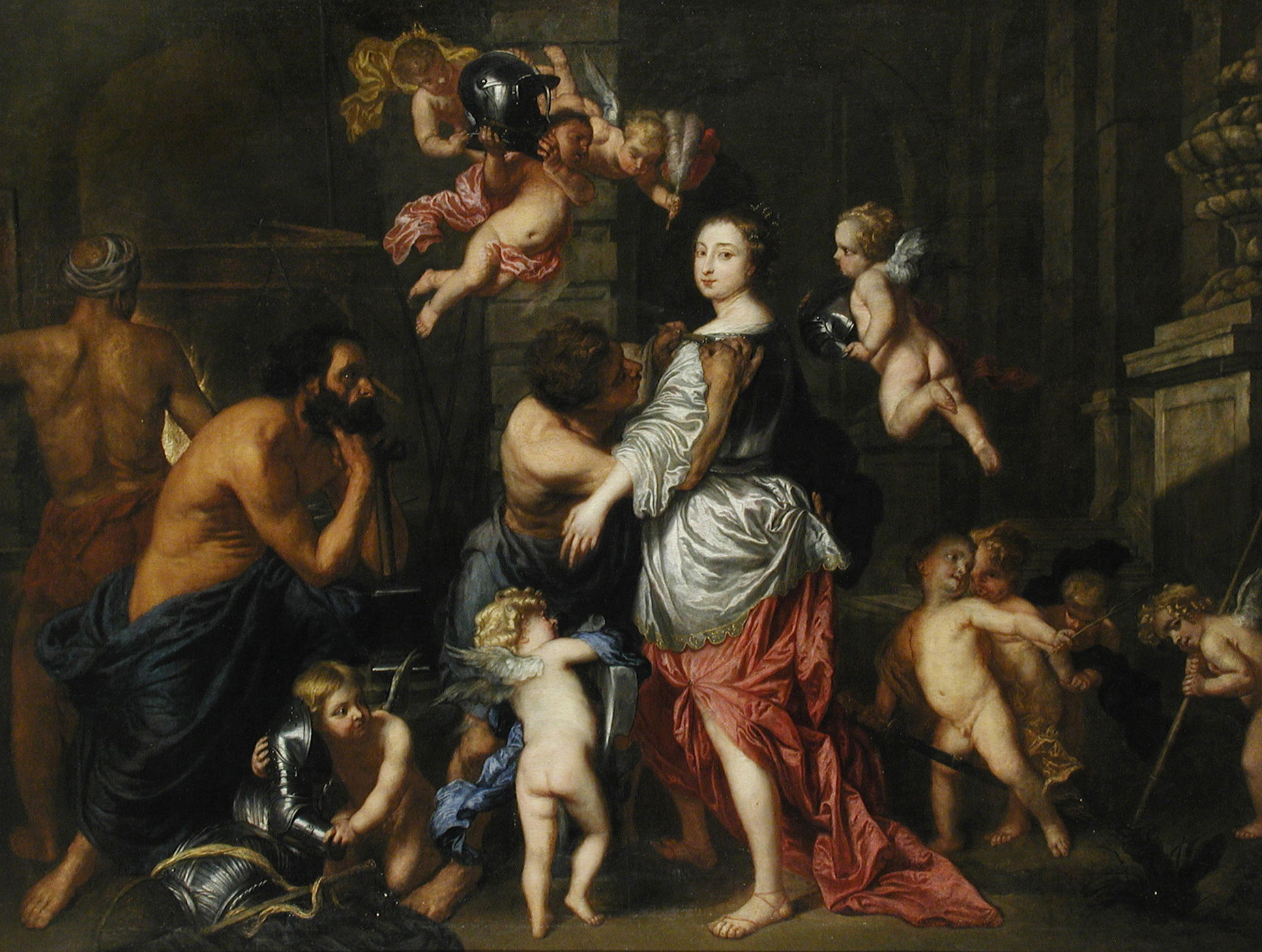
Venus in the Forge of Vulcan by Pieter Thijs

As the son of Jupiter, the king of the gods, and Juno, the queen of the gods, Vulcan should have been quite handsome, but baby Vulcan was small and ugly with a red, bawling face. One day, years later, when he was a boy, there was an argument between his father Jupiter and his mother Juno, Vulcan sided with his mother. His father was naturally furious, and hurled him off the top of Mount Olympus. Vulcan fell down for a day and a night, landing in the volcano Etna. Unfortunately, one of his legs broke as he hit the ground, and never developed properly. Vulcan sank to the depths of the ocean, where the sea-nymph Thetis found him and took him to her underwater grotto, wanting to raise him as her own son.

Vulcan had a happy childhood with dolphins as his playmates and pearls as his toys. Late in his childhood, he found the remains of a fisherman's fire on the beach and became fascinated with an unextinguished coal, still red-hot and glowing.

Vulcan carefully shut this precious coal in a clamshell, took it back to his underwater grotto, and made a fire with it. On the first day after that, Vulcan stared at this fire for hours on end. On the second day, he discovered that when he made the fire hotter with bellows, certain stones sweated iron, silver or gold. On the third day he beat the cooled metal into shapes: bracelets, chains, swords and shields. Vulcan made pearl-handled knives and spoons for his foster mother, and for himself he made a silver chariot with bridles so that seahorses could transport him quickly. He even made slave-girls of gold to wait on him and do his bidding.

Later, Thetis left her underwater grotto to attend a dinner party on Mount Olympus wearing a beautiful necklace of silver and sapphires that Vulcan had made for her. Juno admired the necklace and asked where she could get one. Thetis became flustered, causing Juno to become suspicious; and, at last, the queen god discovered the truth: the baby she had once rejected had grown into a talented blacksmith.

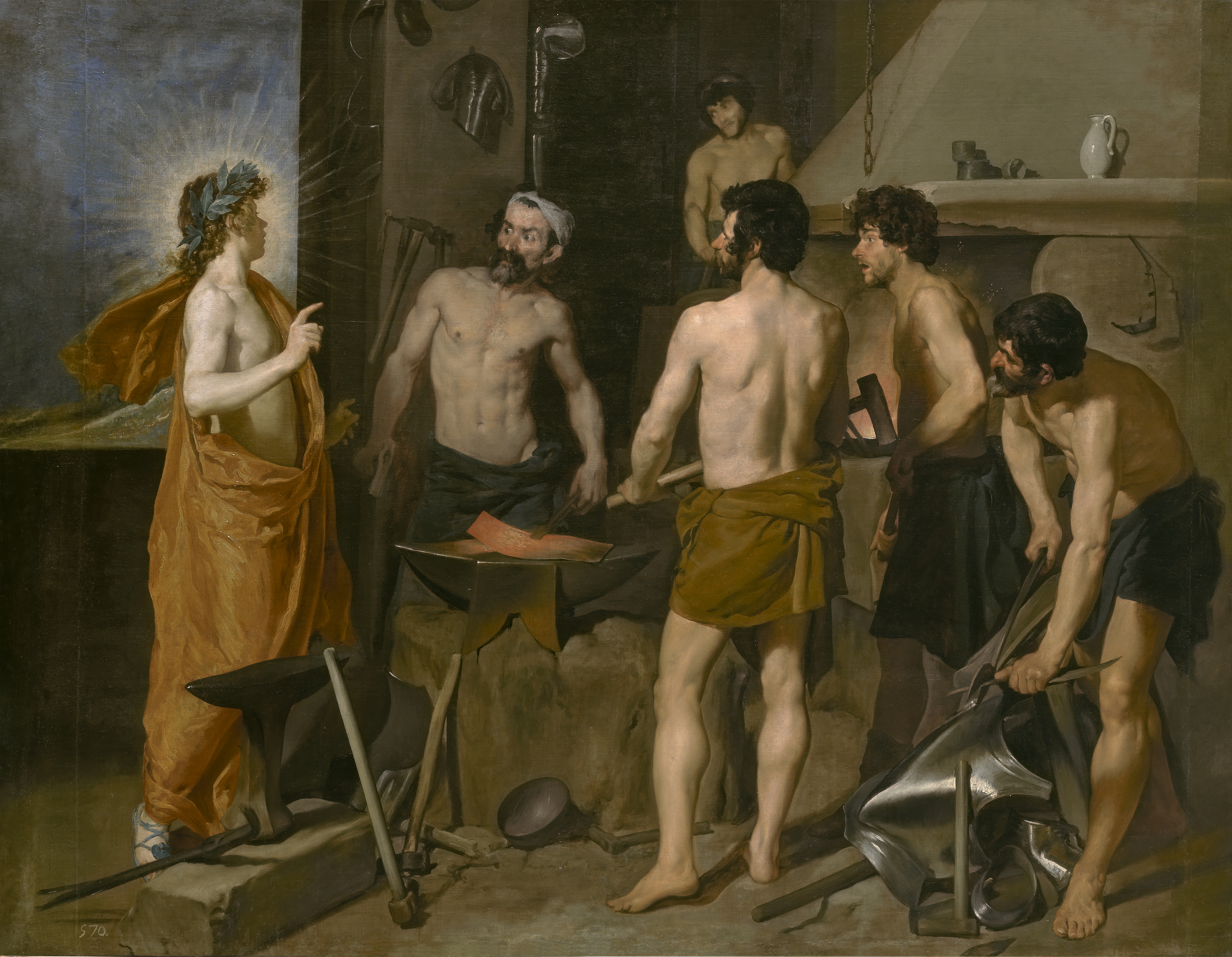
The Forge of Vulcan by Diego Velázquez (1630)

Juno was furious and demanded that Vulcan return home, a demand that he refused. However, he did send Juno a beautifully constructed chair made of silver and gold, inlaid with mother-of-pearl. Juno was delighted with this gift but, as soon as she sat in it her weight triggered hidden springs and metal bands sprung forth to hold her fast. The chair was a cleverly designed trap. It was Jupiter who finally saved the day: he promised that if Vulcan released Juno he would give him a wife, Venus the goddess of love and beauty. Vulcan agreed and married Venus.

Vulcan later built a smithy under Mount Etna on the island of Sicily. It was said that whenever Venus was unfaithful, Vulcan grew angry and beat the red-hot metal with such a force that sparks and smoke rose up from the top of the mountain, creating a volcanic eruption.

To punish mankind for stealing the secrets of fire, Jupiter ordered the other gods to make a poisoned gift for man. Vulcan's contribution to the beautiful and foolish Pandora was to mould her from clay and to give her form. He also made the thrones for the other gods on Mount Olympus.

== Sanctuaries ==
The main and most ancient sanctuary of Vulcan in Rome was the Volcanal, located in the area Volcani, an open-air space at the foot of the Capitolium, in the northwestern corner of the Roman Forum, with an area dedicated to the god and a perennial fire. It was one of the most ancient Roman shrines. According to Roman tradition the sanctuary had been dedicated by Romulus. He had placed on the site a bronze quadriga dedicated to the god, a war trophy from the Fidenates. According to Plutarch, though, the war in question was that against Cameria, that occurred sixteen years after the foundation of Rome. There Romulus would have also dedicated to Vulcan a statue of himself and an inscription in Greek characters listing his successes. Plutarch states that Romulus was represented crowned by Victory. Moreover, he would have planted a sacred lotus tree in the sanctuary that was still living at the time of Pliny the Elder and was said to be as old as the city. The hypothesis has been presented that the Volcanal was founded when the Forum was still outside the town walls.

The Volcanal was perhaps used as a cremation site, as suggested by the early use of the Forum as a burial site. Livy mentions it twice, in 189 and 181 BC, for the prodigies of a rain of blood.

The area Volcani was probably a locus substructus. It was five meters higher than the Comitium and from it the kings and the magistrates of the beginnings of the republic addressed the people, before the building of the rostra.

On the Volcanal there was also a statue of Horatius Cocles that had been moved here from the Comitium, locus inferior, after it had been struck by lightning. Aulus Gellius writes that some haruspices were summoned to expiate the prodigy and they had it moved to a lower site, where sunlight never reached, out of their hatred for the Romans. The fraud was revealed, however, and the haruspices were executed. Later it was found that the statue should be placed on a higher site, thus it was placed in the area Volcani.

In 304 BC a sacellum to Concordia was built in the area Volcani: it was dedicated by aedilis curulis Cnaeus Flavius.

According to Samuel Ball Platner, in the course of time the Volcanal would have been more and more encroached upon by the surrounding buildings until it was totally covered over. Nonetheless the cult was still alive in the first half of the imperial era, as is testified by the finding of a dedica of Augustus's dating from 9 BC.

At the beginning of the 20th century, behind the Arch of Septimius Severus were found some ancient tufaceous foundations that probably belonged to the Volcanal and traces of a rocky platform, 3.95 meters long and 2.80 meters wide, that had been covered with concrete and painted in red. Into its upper surface are dug several narrow channels and in front of it are the remains of a draining channel made of tufaceous slabs. The hypothesis has been suggested that this was Vulcan's area itself. The rock shows signs of damages and repairs. On the surface there are some hollows, either round or square, that bear resemblance to graves and were interpreted as such in the past, particularly by Von Duhn. After the discovery of cremation tombs in the Forum the latter scholar maintained that the Volcanal was originally the site where corpses were cremated.

Another temple was erected to the god before 215 BC in the Campus Martius, near the Circus Flaminius, where games in his honour were held during the festival of the Volcanalia.

== Outside Rome ==
At Ostia the cult of the god, as well as his sacerdos, was the most important of the town. The sacerdos was named pontifex Vulcani et aedium sacrarum: he had under his jurisdiction all the sacred buildings in town and could give or withhold the authorisation to erect new statues to Eastern divinities. He was chosen for life, perhaps by the council of the decuriones, and his position was the equivalent of the pontifex maximus in Rome. It was the highest administrative position in the town of Ostia.

He was selected from among people who had already held public office in Ostia or in the imperial administration. The pontifex was the sole authority who had a number of subordinate officials to help discharge his duties, namely three praetores and two or three aediles. These were religious offices, different from civil offices of similar name.

On the grounds of a fragmentary inscription found at Annaba (ancient Hippo Regius), it is considered possible that the writer Suetonius had held this office.

From Strabon we know that at Pozzuoli there was an area called in Greek agora' of Hephaistos (Lat. Forum Vulcani). The place is a plain where many sulphurous vapour outlets are located (currently Solfatara).

Pliny the Elder records that near Modena fire came out from soil statis Vulcano diebus, on fixed days devoted to Vulcan.

== In popular culture ==
Vulcan is the patron god of the English steel-making city of Sheffield. His statue stands on top of Sheffield Town Hall.

The Vulcan statue located in Birmingham, Alabama is the largest cast iron statue in the world.

A 12-foot-tall and 1200-pound Vulcan statue at California University of Pennsylvania serves as the school's mascot.

In 2013, Reuters reported that the name "Vulcan" was being promoted as a name for "newly discovered" moons of Pluto. The moons had been discovered in 2011 and 2012, bringing the count of known moons of Pluto to five. Though the name Vulcan won a popular vote, the International Astronomical Union decided in June 2013 to finalize the names as Charon, Styx, Nix, Kerberos, and Hydra.

The name "Vulcan" has been used for various other fictional planets, in and out of the Solar System, that do not correspond to the hypothetical planet Vulcan, which was theorized by Urbain Le Verrier to orbit the Sun closer in than Mercury. The planet Vulcan in the Star Trek franchise, for instance, is specified as orbiting 40 Eridani A.

Vulcan is featured in the film The Adventures of Baron Munchausen by Terry Gilliam.

Vulcan is a main character in the novel The Automation by B.L.A. and G.B. Gabbler. His role is often a "deus ex machina" one, but he and his wife (called Venus) are still essential to the overall plot.

Vulcan is a character in the Starz TV series American Gods, based on the novel by Neil Gaiman. He is not a character in the novel and is now the "god of guns" in this version, using the forge at his ammunition factory as a symbolic representation of a volcano.

Vulcan is a character in the John Prine song, "The Lonesome Friends of Science" from his last album, The Tree of Forgiveness released in 2018.

The M61A1 20mm cannon fitted to many Western combat aircraft is named for Vulcan as the bringer of fire.

== See also ==
- Adur Burzen-Mihr
- Adur Gushnasp
- Agni
- Apam Napat
- Atar
- Kaveh the Blacksmith
- Kurdalægon
- Tlepsh
- Vulcan Iron Works
- Vulcanization
