= Velchanos =

Ancient Minoan god associated with Zeus

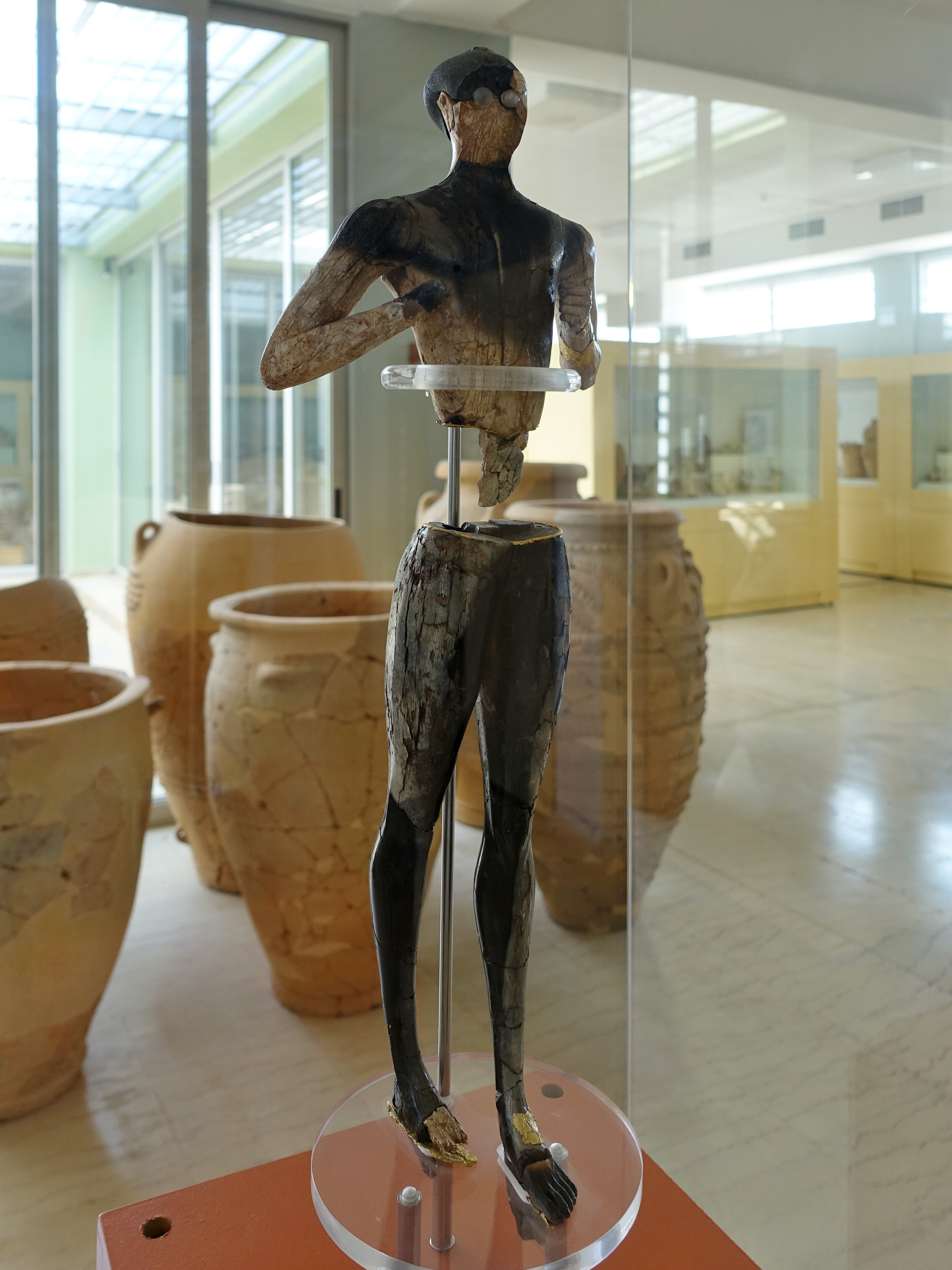
- The Palaikastro Kouros (c. 1450 BC) has been regarded by some as a very early form of Zeus. The "young god" may have been a "vegetable god" who died in the winter and was reborn in the spring each year.
- Tree: Oak
- Festivals: Velchania
- Parents: Mother Goddess
- Consort: Mother Goddess

Equivalents
- Greek: Zeus

Velchanos, properly Welchanos (Ancient Greek: Ϝελχάνος, Welkhános), Gelchanos (Γελχάνος, Gelkhános), or Elchanos (Ελχάνος, Elkhános), is an ancient Minoan god associated with vegetation and worshipped in Crete. He was one of the main deities in the Minoan pantheon, alongside a Mother Goddess figure who appears to have been his mother and consort, with the two participating in an hieros gamos.

The cult of Velchanos was likely influenced by Marduk. Following the rise of Mycenaean Greece and contact with the Minoans, Velchanos' cult influenced that of Zeus (ruler of the gods) and Hephaestus (god of fire), who was identified with Moloch.

According to Arthur Evans, a tree cult played one of the most important aspects of the Minoan religion in ancient Crete. In this cult, two deities were worshipped; one male and one female. In this tree cult, while the Mother Goddess was viewed as a personification of tree-vegetation, the male god formed a "concrete image of the vegetation itself in the shape of a divine child or a youth", with the two forming a mother and child relationship.

== Worship ==
=== Mycenaean period ===
The Minoans viewed Velchanos as less powerful than the goddess. At some point, the Mycenaean civilization came in contact with the Minoans and identified their own god Zeus with Velchanos. This religious syncretism led to Zeus absorbing some of Velchanos' traits, which also affected Zeus' mythology, who was henceforth stated to have been born in Crete and often represented as a beardless youth; he was also venerated as Zeus Velchanos.

=== Hellenistic period ===
In the 4th century BC, during the beginning of the Hellenistic era, Hagia Triada fell under the control of the polis of Phaistos and was reinstated as a place of worship. In this period, an aedicula was installed over a Minoan stoa in honor of Zeus Velchanos. In the same location, a bull protome was also found, built around the 2nd century BC, which is attributed to the shrine of Velchanos. Velchanos appears to have been worshipped in Gortyna as well, as coins depicting him have been found.

Velchanus' main festival, the Velchania, was likely celebrated in the Cretan poleis of Gortyna, Lyttos, and Knossos.

== Iconography ==
Coins from Phaistos depicted Zeus Velchanos with a cock in his lap. These coins also depicted him with an oak tree. He was also depicted with a bull. At other times, Velchanos was depicted as an eagle.

== Influence ==
Given the similarities in naming, it has been suggested that Velchanos was an influence on Vulcan from Roman mythology. A neighborhood dedicated to his worship is sometimes credited with the modern name of Chania on Crete.
