= Baths of Decius =

Coordinates: 41.8833°N 12.4843°E

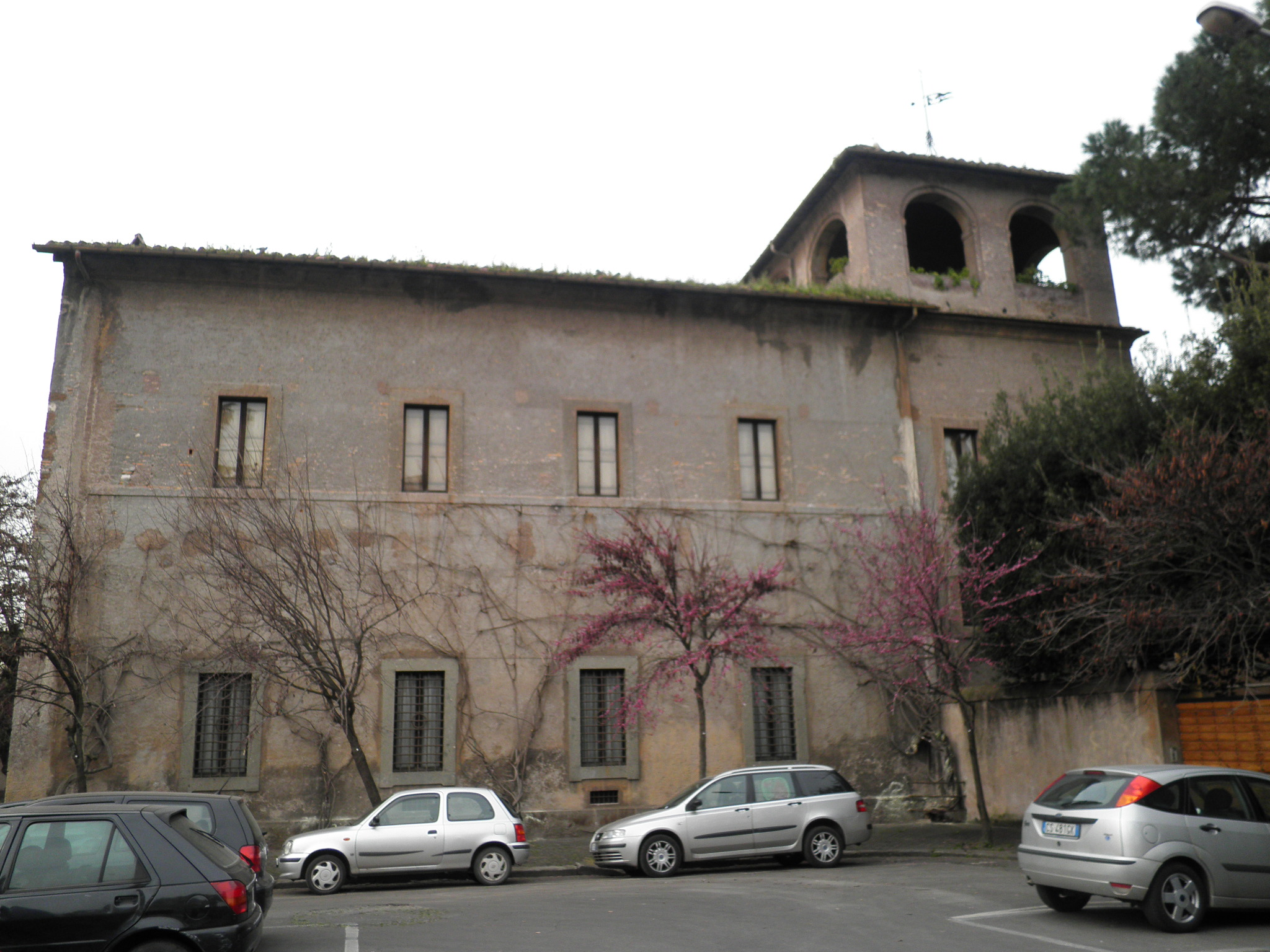
The present-day Casale Torlonia.

The Baths of Decius (Latin: thermae Decianae) were a complex of thermae (baths) built on the Aventine Hill in Rome by Emperor Decius in 249 or 252. The site lies between the present-day locations of the churches of Santo Alessio and Santa Prisca, on the Vigna Torlonia, beneath piazza del Tempio di Diana (named after the Temple of Diana) and the Casale Maccharini Torlonia, which contains remains from the baths. Some additional ruins of the baths also survive.

Earlier structures on the site have also left remains, visible in the basement of the Casale Torlonia and under the piazza del Tempio di Diana. These buildings display a technique resembling opus quasi reticulatum, along with traces of a decorative scheme of painted stucco imitating marble in the Pompeian First Style, the oldest evidence of this style in Rome, dating to the last quarter of the 2nd century BC. Another building on the site is lavishly decorated with mosaics and wall-paintings depicting masks, flowers, and landscapes. It dates to the Trajanic period and may have been the Privata Traiani, Trajan's private residence before he became emperor, which is known to have been located in the area, or one of Decius' own residences.

The main source for the appearance of the Baths of Decius is a plan made by Andrea Palladio, now in the Duke of Devonshire's collection. The complex was 70 by 35 metres, including an apse belonging to an aula at the southern corner. They were built to serve the wealthy and sophisticated inhabitants of the Aventine, unlike the nearby Baths of Caracalla, which were larger but intended for mass use by the inhabitants of Regio XII. They were decorated with artworks, including an infant Hercules in green basalt and a sleeping Endymion, both now in the Capitoline Museums. The complex is mentioned in several inscriptions which not only confirm its location but also give certain details on its history, such as its two restorations, once by Constantius I or Constantius II and a second one in 414 under Honorius by Caecina Decius Acinatius Albinus following damage in Alaric's Sack of Rome.

== See also ==
- List of Roman public baths
- List of ancient monuments in Rome

== Bibliography ==
- Samuel Ball Platner, A Topographical Dictionary of Ancient Rome, rev. Thomas Ashby. Oxford: 1929, p. 526-527.
