= Sacerdos Bonae Deae =

Sacerdos Bonae Deae or Damiatrix was the title of the Priestess of the goddess Bona Dea in Ancient Rome.

As Damiatrix she officiated over the famous December rites reserved for women. She also performed secret sacrifices and rites to benefit the welfare of the city in regard the health and fertility. The sanctuary of the goddess provided herbal medicine and functioned as a pharmacy, and the priestess are likely to have been expected to have knowledge within pharmacy and herbal medicine. She was the head of a large sanctuary staff including priestesses of lower rank called ministrae, who performed smaller ceremonies, as well as assistants. Antistites managed the temple pharmacy. Priestesses of lower rank could be freedwomen.
