= Caeculus =

Mythical character

In Roman mythology, Caeculus (meaning "little blind boy", from caecus "blind") was a son of Vulcan, and the legendary founder of Praeneste (modern Palestrina).

King Caeculus appears in Book VII of Virgil's Aeneid as an ally of Turnus against Aeneas and the Trojans, where he is said to be the "founder of Praeneste" and described as "the son of Vulcan, born among the rural herds and found upon the hearth".

The myth concerning the birth of Caeculus and his divine parentage is of great interest for the study of Latin religion. In the myth he is the nephew of two divine twin brothers (divi fratres) called the Depidii (or Digidii). They had a younger sister. One day while she was sitting by the hearth, a spark landed on her and she was impregnated. When the child was born, she exposed him near the temple of Jupiter, where he was found, lying next to a fire, by a group of girls (one version says that these girls were also sisters of the Depidii), who had come to fetch water from a nearby spring. The girls took the child to his uncles, the Depidii, who reared him. After spending his childhood among shepherds, he gathered a band of youngsters of his age, and founded the city of Praeneste. Caeculus was unharmed by a fire, caused by his casting doubt on the divinity of his ancestry. He also showed mastery over fire by starting and extinguishing another at his will. The smoke though damaged his eyes, which remained smaller than normal, hence his name, Caeculus, little blind one.

His story is reminiscent of the practise of ver sacrum and similar to that of Romulus and Remus the founders of Rome. Caeculus was claimed as the eponymous ancestor of the Roman gens Caecilia, and also perhaps by the lesser known gens Caesia.
