= Aventinus (mythology) =

Mythological character son of Hercules and Rhea

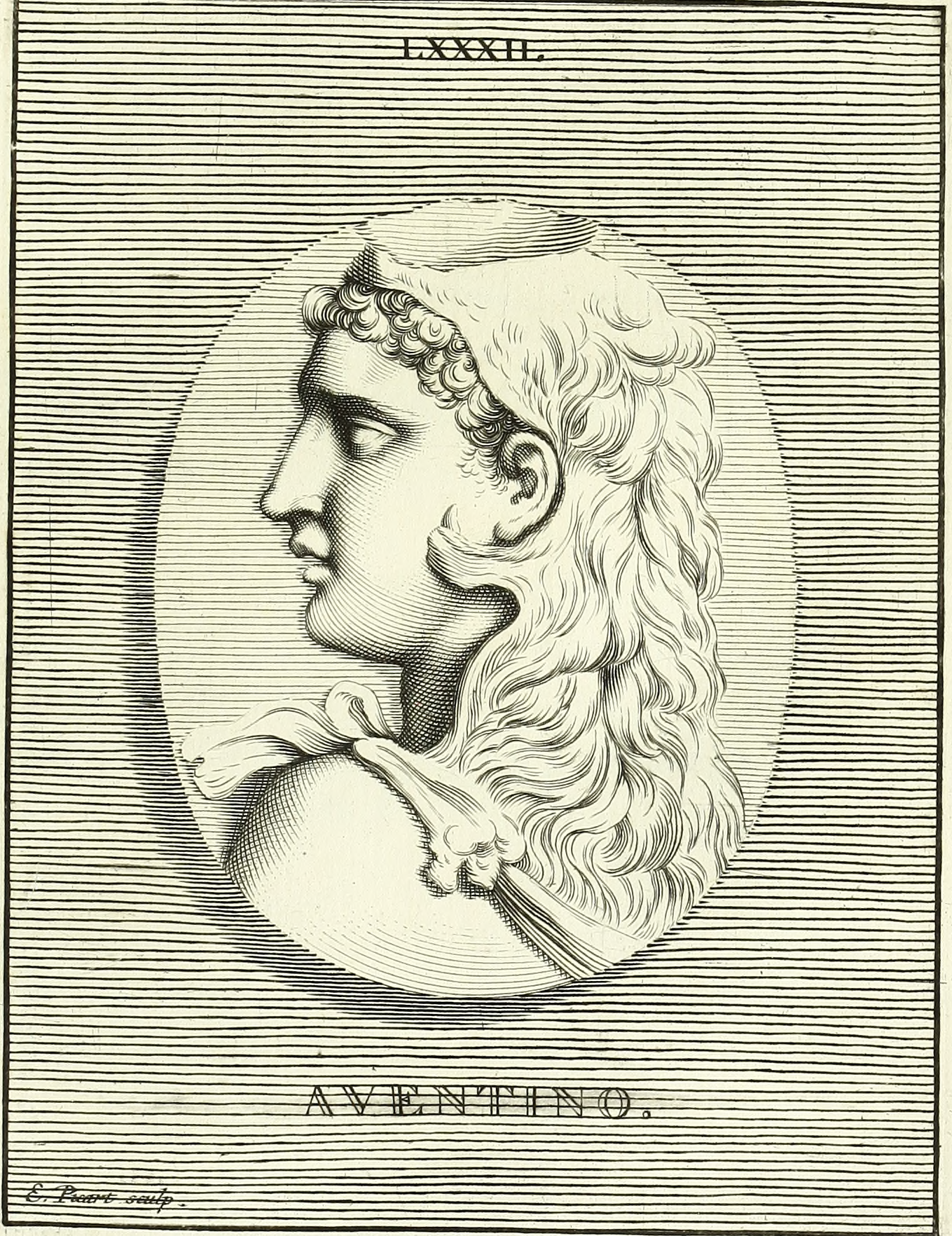
Portrait of Aventinus from the book Images des héros et des grands hommes de l'antiquité (1731)

Aventinus was a son of Hercules and the priestess Rhea mentioned in Virgil's Aeneid, Book vii. 656, as an ally of Mezentius and enemy of Aeneas (Dryden's translation):

Next Aventinus drives his chariot round
The Latian plains, with palms and laurels crown'd.
Proud of his steeds, he smokes along the field;
His father's hydra fills his ample shield:
A hundred serpents hiss about the brims;
The son of Hercules he justly seems
By his broad shoulders and gigantic limbs;
Of heav'nly part, and part of earthly blood,
A mortal woman mixing with a god.
For strong Alcides, after he had slain
The triple Geryon, drove from conquer'd Spain
His captive herds; and, thence in triumph led,
On Tuscan Tiber's flow'ry banks they fed.
Then on Mount Aventine the son of Jove
The priestess Rhea found, and forc'd to love.
For arms, his men long piles and jav'lins bore;
And poles with pointed steel their foes in battle gore.
Like Hercules himself his son appears,
In salvage pomp; a lion's hide he wears;
About his shoulders hangs the shaggy skin;
The teeth and gaping jaws severely grin.
Thus, like the god his father, homely dress'd,
He strides into the hall, a horrid guest.

Servius This passage speaks of an Aventinus, a king of the aboriginal inhabitants of Rome, who was killed and buried on the hill afterward called the Aventine Hill. This king may be conflated with the Aeneid figure or with Aventinus:

"The Aventine is a hill in the city of Rome. It is accepted that it derives its name from birds (aves) which, rising from the Tiber, nested there, as we read in the eighth book of a suitable home for the nests of ill-omened birds. This is because of a king of the Aboriginal Italians, Aventinus by name, who were both killed and buried there - just as the Alban king Aventinus was, he was succeeded by Procas. Varro, however, states that amongst the Roman people, the Sabines accepted this mountain when it was offered to them by Romulus, and called it the Aventine after the Aventus river in its area. It is therefore accepted that these different opinions came later, for in the beginning it was called Aventinus after either the birds or the Aboriginal King: from which it is accepted that the son of Hercules mentioned here took his name from that of the hill, not vice versa."

This Aventinus (the son of Hercules) is not mentioned elsewhere in classical literature.

== Scholarly interpretations ==
Classical scholars generally assume that Virgil himself invented the character, either deriving the name from one of the Roman hills or drawing on an otherwise obscure source [4]. The researcher A. Grandazzi argues that Virgil intended to incorporate into his poem the figure of a legendary ruler buried on the Aventine Hill but, due to chronological inconsistencies, could not portray this figure as a king of Alba Longa. Consequently, Aventinus is presented as a son of Hercules. The poet may have justified this genealogy by the proximity of the tomb of King Aventinus to the Great Altar of Hercules.

In her analysis of Aventinus, R. Parks emphasizes the character’s duality. On the one hand, he is depicted as a true heir of Hercules: a slayer of monsters and a victor in chariot races. On the other hand, the image of the Hydra on his shield may be interpreted to suggest that he himself represents one of the monsters destined to be defeated by the new hero, Aeneas. Parks further hypothesizes that the chariot of Aventinus—described as having “won the palm”—was drawn by the horses of Diomedes.

The Russian scholar A. Kuznetsov classifies the figure of Aventinus among the “unresolved enigmas” of the Aeneid. Although the son of Hercules is presented as a figure of primary importance and, like Aeneas, wears a lion’s skin, he is not mentioned again later in the poem.

W. Warde Fowler suggested that lines 664–668 of the Aeneid refer not to Aventinus but to the Sabine hero Ufens. He points to a dissonance in the description of the son of Hercules: Aventinus initially appears riding a war chariot in ceremonial attire, yet later he is unexpectedly depicted walking on foot in an animal skin among soldiers armed in the Sabine manner. According to Fowler, this confusion may have arisen through the work of the poem’s early editors. One possible explanation is that the Sabine hero, like Hercules, was also represented wearing a lion’s skin.

== Sources ==
- Smith's biographical dictionary
