= Temple of Bona Dea =

Ancient Roman sanctuary

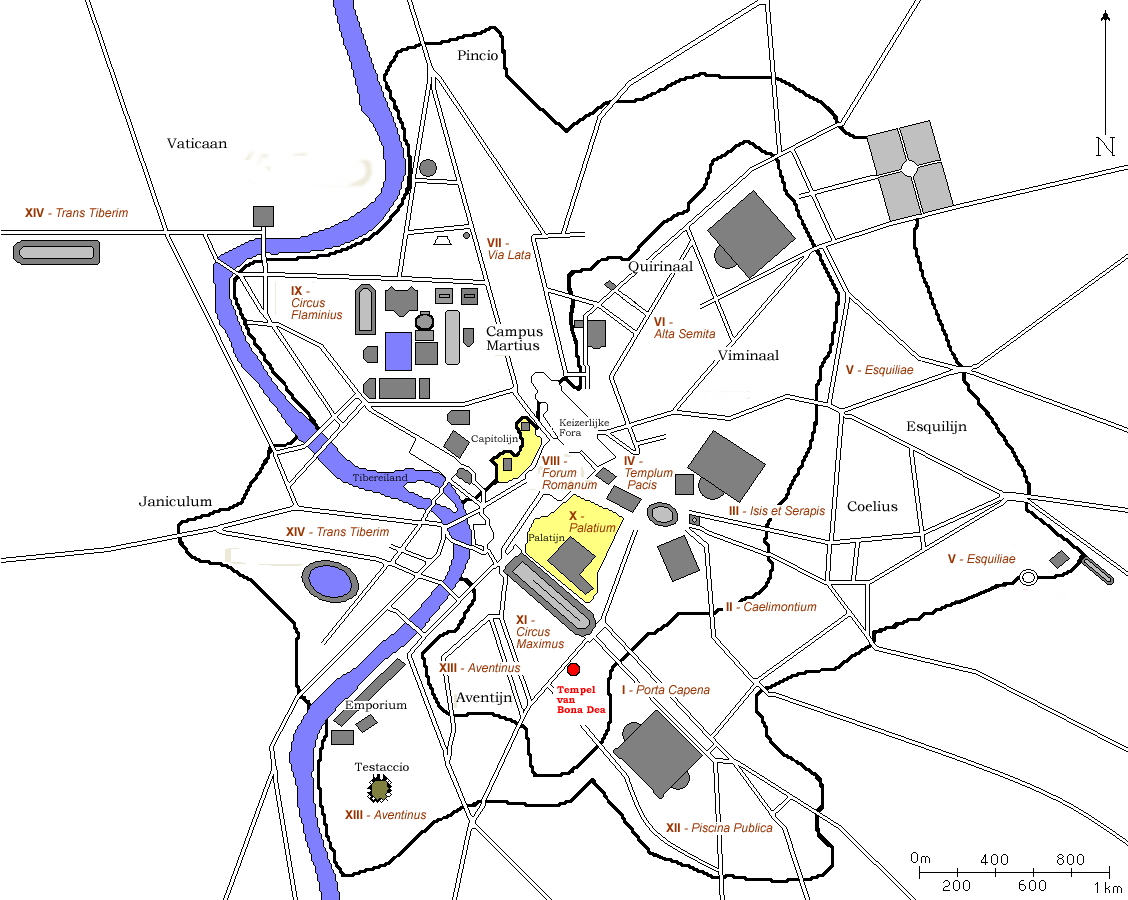
Plan of Rome showing the location of the Temple of the Bona Dea

The Temple of Bona Dea was an ancient sanctuary in Aventine Hill of Ancient Rome, erected the 3rd century BC and dedicated to the goddess Bona Dea.

The date of the foundation is unknown. However, the cult was introduced in Rome after 272 BC, and the sanctuary was founded in that century. It is mentioned to have been repaired by the empress Livia, spouse of Emperor Augustus.

The sanctuary was a center of healing in Rome. Domesticated snakes were housed in the temple, and medicinal herbs were sold. It was the center of the cult of the festival of Bona Dea, which was celebrated on 1 May. During the festival, no men were allowed within the borders of the sanctuary.

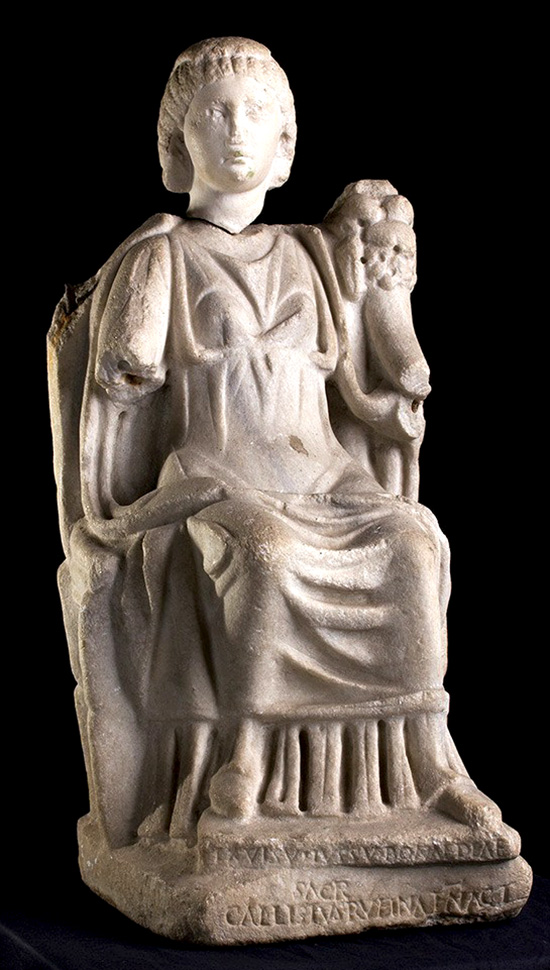
Bona Dea Marble Statue with Epigraph

The Temple of Bona Dea was still in use during the 3rd century. If still in use by the 4th-century, it would have been closed during the persecution of pagans in the late Roman Empire. A church was erected in the area of the temple in the 5th-century.

== See also ==
- List of Ancient Roman temples
