= Bona Dea =

Roman deity

- Fertility Goddess
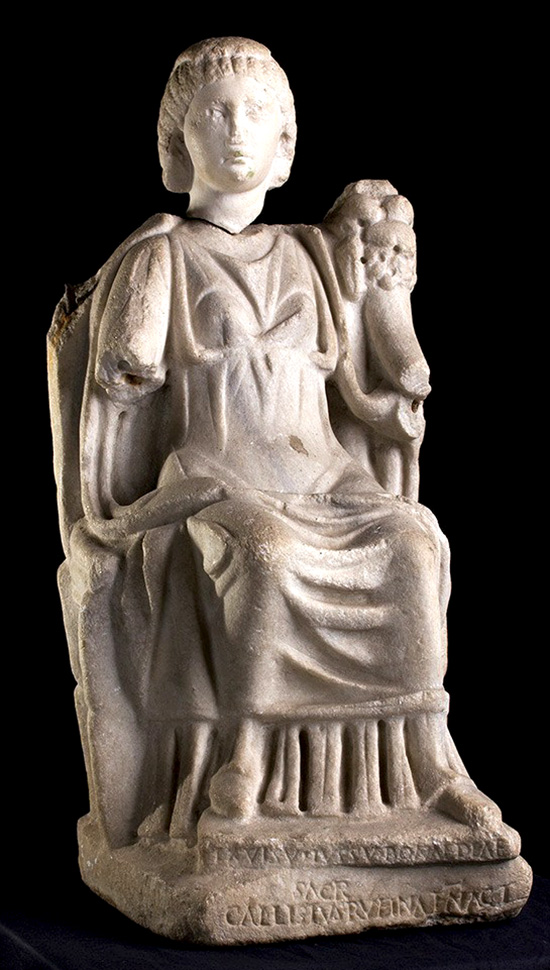
- Bona Dea marble statue with epigraph; Ex visu iussu Bonae Deae sacr(um) Callistus Rufinae N(ostrae) Act(or) (Dedicated to Bona Dea by Callistus, slave of Rufina) CIL. XIV 2251. Antoninian, from Ager Albanus, Italy
- Major cult center: Rome
- Symbols: Snake, cornucopia
- Day: May 1
- Temple: Temple of Bona Dea
- Consort: Faunus

In ancient Roman religion, Bona Dea (Latin: [ˈbɔna ˈdɛ.a]; 'Good Goddess') was a goddess associated with chastity and fertility among married Roman women, healing, and the protection of the state and people of Rome. According to Roman literary sources, she was brought from Magna Graecia at some time during the early or middle Republic, and was given her own state cult on the Aventine Hill.

Her rites allowed women the use of strong wine and blood-sacrifice, things otherwise forbidden to them by Roman tradition. Men were barred from some of her mysteries and only initiates were given the possession of her true name. Given that male authors had limited knowledge of her rites and attributes, ancient speculations about her identity abound, among them that she was an aspect of Terra, Ops, Cybele, or Ceres, or a Latin form of a Greek goddess "Damia" (perhaps Demeter). Most often, she was identified as the wife, sister, or daughter of the god Faunus, thus an equivalent or aspect of the fertility nature-goddess Fauna, who could prophesy the fates of women.

The goddess had two main annual festivals. One was held at her Aventine temple, for the benefit of the Roman people; the other was hosted by the wife of a Roman senior annual magistrate for an invited group of elite matrons and female attendants. The latter festival came to scandalous prominence in 62 BC, when the politician Publius Clodius Pulcher was tried for his sacrilegious intrusion on the rites, allegedly bent on the seduction of Julius Caesar's wife, Pompeia. Clodius was found not guilty, but Caesar divorced Pompeia because "Caesar's wife must be above suspicion". For his support of the prosecution, Cicero earned Clodius' undying hatred. The festival fertility rites remained a subject of male curiosity and speculation, both religious and prurient.

Bona Dea's cults in the city of Rome were led by the Vestal Virgins and the Sacerdos Bonae Deae, and her provincial cults by virgin or matron priestesses. Surviving statuary shows her as a sedate Roman matron with a cornucopia and a snake. Personal dedications to her are attested among all classes, especially plebeians, freedmen and women, and slaves. Approximately one third of her dedications are from men, some of whom can be identified as acolytes and priests of her cult.

== Titles, names and origins ==
Bona Dea ("The Good Goddess") is a name, an honorific title and a respectful pseudonym; the goddess' true or cult name is unknown. Her other, less common names or pseudonyms include Feminea Dea ("The Women's Goddess"), Laudanda ... Dea ("The Goddess who must be Praised"), and Sancta ("The Holy One"). She is a goddess of "no definable type", with several origins and a range of different characteristics and functions.

Based on what little they knew of her rites and attributes, Roman historians speculated about her true name and identity. Festus describes her as identical with a "women's goddess" named Damia, which Georges Dumézil sees as an ancient misreading of Greek "Demeter". In the late Imperial era, the neoplatonist author Macrobius identifies her as a universal earth-goddess, an epithet of Maia, Terra, or Cybele, worshiped under the names of Ops, Fauna, and Fatua. The Christian author Lactantius, claiming the late Republican polymath Varro as his source, describes her as Faunus' wife and sister, named "Fenta Fauna" or "Fenta Fatua" (Fenta "the prophetess" or Fenta "the foolish").

== Mythology ==
Cicero makes no reference to any myth pertaining to Bona Dea. Later Roman scholars connected her to the goddess Fauna, a central figure in Latium's aristocratic foundation myth, which was thus re-embroidered as a Roman moral fable. Several variants are known; Fauna is daughter, wife or sister of Faunus (also named Faunus Fatuus, meaning Faunus "the foolish", or seer). Faunus was son of Picus, and was the first king of the Latins, empowered with the gift of prophecy. In Roman religion he was a pastoral god and protector of flocks, with a shrine and oracle on the Aventine, sometimes identified with Inuus and later, with the Greek god Pan.

As his female counterpart, Fauna had similar gifts, domains, and powers the applied solely to women. In Plutarch's version of the myth, the mortal Fauna secretly gets drunk on wine, which is forbidden her. When Faunus finds out, he thrashes her with myrtle rods; in Lactantius's version, Faunus thrashes her to death, regrets the deed, and deifies her. Servius derives the names Faunus and Fauna, collectively known as the Fatui, from fari (to prophesy): they "are also called Fatui because they utter divine prophecy in a state of stupor". Macrobius writes that Bona Dea is "the same as Fauna, Ops or Fatua... It is said too that she was the daughter of Faunus, and that she resisted the amorous advances of her father who had fallen in love with her, so that he even beat her with myrtle twigs because she did not yield to his desires though she had been made drunk by him on wine. It is believed that the father changed himself into a serpent, however, and under this guise had intercourse with his daughter." This myth bears a marked similarity to the rape of Persephone by her father Zeus in the form of a chthonic snake in Orphic mythology. Macrobius refers the serpent's image at the goddess' rites to this mythical transformation, and to the live, harmless serpents who roamed the goddess' temple precincts.

Varro explains the exclusion of men from Bona Dea's cult as a consequence of her great modesty; no man but her husband had ever seen her, or heard her name. For Servius, this makes her the paragon of chaste womanhood. Most likely, once Fauna's mythology seemed to offer an explanation for Bona Dea's mysterious cult, the myth developed circumstantially to fit what little was known of the practice. In turn, the cult practice may have changed to support the virtuous ideological message required of the myths, particularly during the Augustan religious reforms that identified Bona Dea with the empress Livia. H. S. Versnel notes the elements common to the Bona Dea festival, Fauna's myths, and Greek Demeter's Thesmophoria, as "wine, myrtle, serpents and female modesty blemished".

== Festival and cult ==
=== Republican era ===
The known features of Bona Dea's cults recall those of various earth and fertility goddesses of the Graeco-Roman world, especially the Thesmophoria festival to Demeter. They included nocturnal rites conducted by predominantly or exclusively female initiates and female priestesses, music, dance and wine, and sacrifice of a sow. During the Roman Republican era, two such cults to Bona Dea were held at different times and locations in the city of Rome.

One was held on May 1 at Bona Dea's Aventine temple. Its date connects her to Maia; its location connects her to Rome's plebeian commoner class, whose tribunes and emergent aristocracy resisted patrician claims to rightful religious and political dominance. The festival and temple's foundation year is uncertain – Ovid credits it to Claudia Quinta (c. late 3rd century BC). The rites are inferred as some form of mystery, concealed from the public gaze and, according to most later Roman literary sources, entirely forbidden to men. In the Republican era, Bona Dea's Aventine festivals were probably distinctly plebeian affairs, open to all classes of women and in some limited fashion, to men. Control of her Aventine cult seems to have been contested at various times during the Mid Republican era; a dedication or rededication of the temple in 123 BC by the Vestal Virgin Licinia, with the gift of an altar, shrine and couch, was immediately annulled as unlawful by the Roman Senate; Licinia herself was later charged with inchastity, and executed. By the Late Republic era, Bona Dea's May festival and Aventine temple could have fallen into official disuse, or official disrepute.

The goddess also had a winter festival, attested on only two occasions (63 and 62 BC). It was held in December, at the home of a current senior annual Roman magistrate cum imperio, whether consul or praetor. It was hosted by the magistrate's wife and attended by respectable matrons of the Roman elite. This festival is not marked on any known religious calendar, but was dedicated to the public interest and supervised by the Vestals, and therefore must be considered official. Shortly after 62 BC, Cicero describes it as one of very few lawful nocturnal festivals allowed to women, privileged to those of aristocratic class, and coeval with Rome's earliest history.

==== Festival rites ====
The house was ritually cleansed of all unauthorized male persons. Then the magistrate's wife and her assistants made bowers of vine-leaves, and decorated the house's banqueting hall with "all manner of growing and blooming plants" except for myrtle, whose presence and naming were expressly forbidden. A banquet table was prepared, with a couch (pulvinar) for the goddess and the image of a snake. The Vestals brought Bona Dea's cult image from her temple and laid it upon her couch, as an honoured guest. The goddess' meal was prepared: the entrails (exta) of a sow, sacrificed to her on behalf of the Roman people (pro populo Romano), and a libation of sacrificial wine. The festival continued through the night, a banquet with female musicians, fun and games (ludere), and wine; the last was euphemistically referred to as "milk", and its container as a "honey jar". The rites sanctified the temporary removal of customary constraints imposed on Roman women of all classes by Roman tradition, and underlined the pure and lawful sexual potency of virgins and matrons in a context that focused on female lust, instead of the lust of men. According to Cicero, any unauthorized man who caught even a glimpse of the rites could be punished by blinding, but he offers no example of this. Later Roman writers assume that apart from their different dates and locations, Bona Dea's December and May 1 festivals were essentially the same.

=== Clodius and the Bona Dea scandal ===
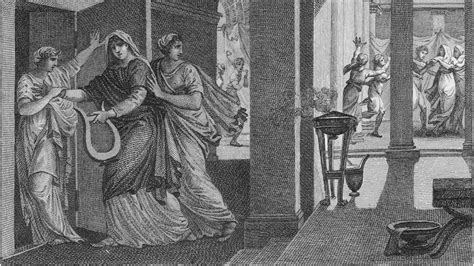
Print after Augustyn Mirys depicting the Bona Dea Scandal

The Winter festival rites of 62 BC were hosted by Pompeia, wife of Julius Caesar, senior magistrate in residence and pontifex maximus. Publius Clodius Pulcher, a popularist politician and ally of Caesar, was said to have intruded, dressed as a woman and intent on the hostess's seduction. According to Plutarch, Caesar's mother, Aurelia concealed the cult objects of the Goddess's mysteries from the intruder; but as the rites had been vitiated, the Vestals were obliged to repeat them, and after further inquiry by the Roman Senate and pontifices, Clodius was charged with desecration, which carried a death sentence. Cicero, whose wife Terentia had hosted the previous year's rites, testified for the prosecution.

Caesar publicly distanced himself from the affair as much as possible – and certainly from Pompeia, whom he divorced because "Caesar's wife must be above suspicion". He had been correctly absent from the rites but as a paterfamilias he was responsible for their piety. As pontifex maximus, he was responsible for the ritual purity and piety of public and private religion. He had the responsibility to ensure that the Vestals had acted correctly, then chair the inquiry into what were essentially his own household affairs. Worse, the place of the alleged offense was the state property lent to every pontifex maximus for his tenure of office. It was a high-profile, much-commented case. The rites remained officially secret, but many details emerged during and after the trial, and remained permanently in the public domain. They fueled theological speculation, as in Plutarch and Macrobius: and they fed the prurient male imagination – given their innate moral weakness, what might women do when given wine and left to their own devices? Such anxieties were nothing new, and underpinned Rome's traditional strictures against female autonomy. In the political and social turmoil of the Late Republic, Rome's misfortunes were taken as signs of divine anger against the personal ambition, religious negligence and outright impiety of her leading politicians.

Clodius' prosecution was at least partly driven by politics. In an otherwise seemingly thorough account, Cicero makes no mention of Bona Dea's May festival, and claims the goddess' cult as an aristocratic privilege from the first; the impeccably patrician Clodius, Cicero's social superior by birth, is presented as an innately impious, low-class oaf, and his popularist policies as threats to Rome's moral and religious security. After two years of legal wrangling, Clodius was acquitted – which Cicero put down to jury-fixing and other backroom dealings – but his reputation was damaged. The scandalous revelations at the trial also undermined the sacred dignity and authority of the Vestals, the festival, the goddess, office of the pontifex maximus and, by association, Caesar and Rome itself. Some fifty years later, Caesar's heir Octavian, later the princeps Augustus, had to deal with its repercussions.

=== Imperial Era ===
Octavian presented himself as restorer of Rome's traditional religion and social values, and as peacemaker between its hitherto warring factions. In 12 BC he became pontifex maximus, which gave him authority over Rome's religious affairs, and over the Vestals, whose presence and authority he conspicuously promoted. His wife Livia was a distant relative of the long-dead but still notorious Clodius; but also related to the unfortunate Vestal Licinia, whose attempted dedication of Bona Dea's Aventine Temple had been thwarted by the Senate. Livia restored the temple and revived its May 1 festival, perhaps drawing attention away from her disreputable kinsman and the scandalous events of 62 BC. Thereafter, Bona Dea's December festival may have continued quietly, or could simply have lapsed, its reputation irreparably damaged. There is no evidence of its abolition. Livia's name did not and could not appear in the official religious calendars, but Ovid's Fasti associates her with May 1, and presents her as the ideal wife and "paragon of female Roman virtue". Most of Bona Dea's provincial and municipal sanctuaries were founded around this time, to propagate the new Imperial ideology. An imperial cult centre in Aquileia honours an Augusta Bona Dea Cereria, probably in connection with the corn dole. Other state cults to the goddess are found at Ostia and Portus. As the Vestals seldom went beyond Rome's city boundary, these cults would have been led by leading women of local elites, whether virgin or matron.

Livia's best efforts to restore Bona Dea's reputation had only moderate success in some circles, where scurrilous and titillating stories of the goddess' rites continued to circulate. Well over a century after the Clodius scandal, Juvenal describes Bona Dea's festival as an opportunity for women of all classes, most shamefully those of the upper class – and men in drag ("which altars do not have their Clodius these days?") – to get drunk and cavort indiscriminately in a sexual free-for-all.

From the late 2nd century, an increasing religious syncretism in Rome's traditional religions presents Bona Dea as one of many aspects of Virgo Caelestis, the celestial Virgin, Great Mother of the gods, whom later Mariologists identify as prototype for the Virgin Mary in Christian theology. Christian writers present Bona Dea – or rather, Fauna, whom they clearly take her to be – as an example of the immorality and absurdity at the heart of traditional Roman religion; according to them, she is no prophetess, merely "foolish Fenta", daughter and wife to her incestuous father, and "good" (bona) only at drinking too much wine.

== Temples ==
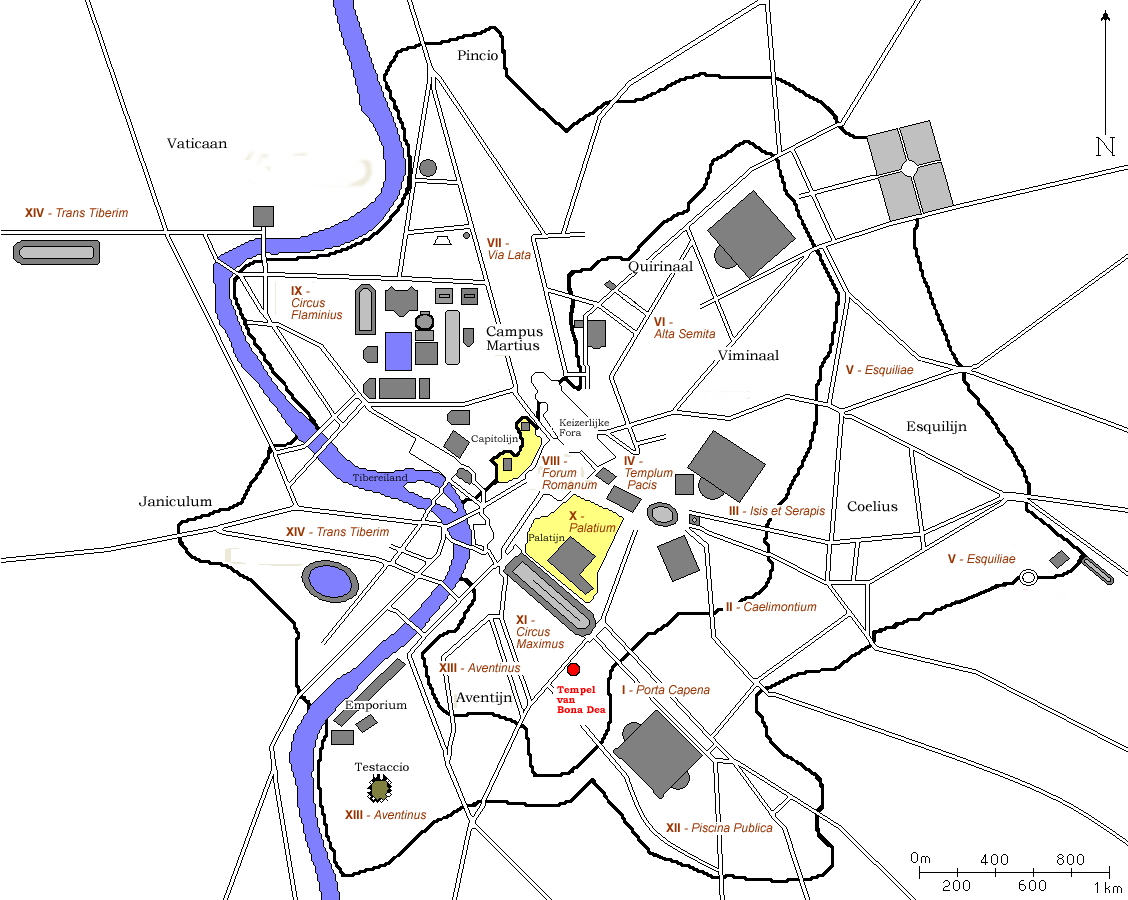
Temple of Bona Dea on a map of ancient Rome around 300 AD

The Temple of Bona Dea in Rome was situated on a lower slope of the northeastern Aventine Hill, beneath the height known as Saxum, southeast of the Circus Maximus. Its foundation year is unknown but the Aventine was host to several foreign or imported cults. Dumezil claims that Festus' identification of Bona Dea with Damia infers a foundation date in or shortly after 272 BC, after Rome's capture of Tarentum. On the other hand Cicero, during Clodius' trial, claimed the goddess' cult as native to Rome, coeval with its foundation. In the middle Republican era, the temple may have fallen into disrepair, or its cult into official disfavour. In 123 BC the Vestal Licinia gave the temple an altar, small shrine and couch for the goddess, but they were removed as unlawful by the pontifex maximus P. Scaevola. The temple's use and status at the time of the Bona Dea scandal are unknown. It was restored in the Imperial era, once by the empress Livia, wife of Augustus, and perhaps again by Hadrian. It survived to at least the 4th century AD. Nothing is known of its architecture or appearance, save that unlike most Roman temples it was walled. It was an important centre of healing; it held a store of various medicinal herbs that could be dispensed at need by its priestesses. Harmless snakes roamed its precincts. Men were supposedly forbidden entry but could dedicate offerings to the goddess, or, according to Ovid, could enter the precincts "if bidden by the goddess".

Most provincial sanctuaries and temples to Bona Dea are too decayed, despoiled or fragmentary to offer firm evidence of structure and layout, but the remains of four are consistent with the sparse descriptions of her Aventine temple. In each, a perimeter wall surrounds a dense compound of annexes, in which some rooms show possible use as dispensaries. The layout would have allowed the concealment of inner cults or mysteries from non-initiates. There is evidence that at least some remained in use to the 4th century AD as cultic healing centres.

== Dedications and iconography ==
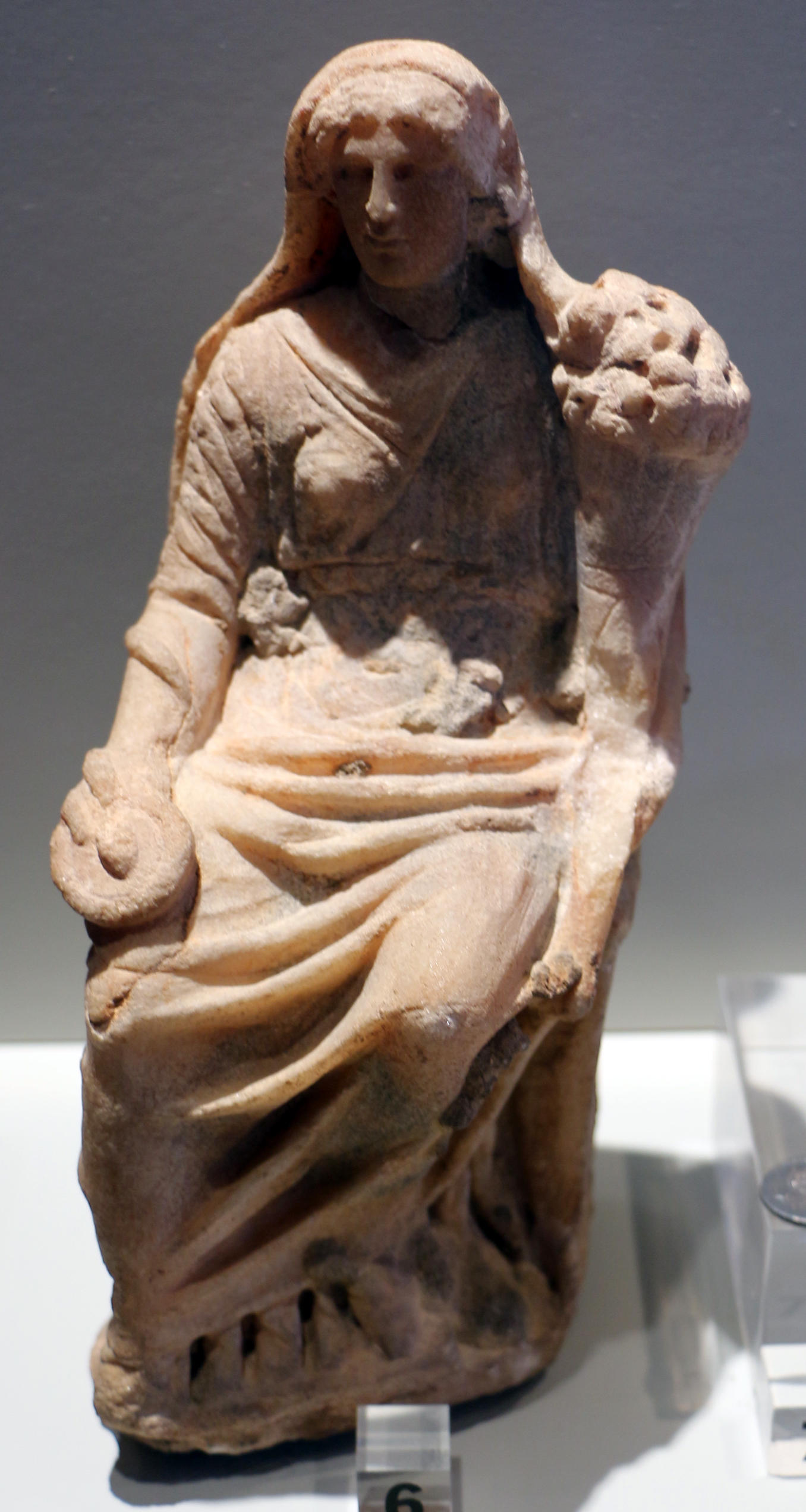
Roman statuette depicting Bona Dea wearing a veil and holding a coiled snake and cornucopia

Despite the exclusively female, aristocratic connections claimed by Cicero for her winter festival at Rome and her high status as a protecting deity of the Roman state, elite dedications to Bona Dea are far outnumbered by the personal dedications of the Roman plebs, particularly the ingenui. The greatest number of all are from freedmen and slaves, male and female. An estimated one-third of all dedications are from men, one of whom, a provincial Greek, claims to be a priest of her cult. Others describe themselves as sacerdotes, magistri, or ministri (priests and ministers) of the goddess. While almost all Roman literary sources present the exclusion of men as an official and absolute rule of her cult, this is more likely a ritualised element of her annual festival, at least in Cicero's account of the same, than an everyday prohibition or an aspect of mystes vitiated by Clodius' unlawful presence. Inscriptions of the Imperial era show her appeal as a personal or saviour-goddess, extolled as Augusta and Domina; or as an all-goddess, titled as Regina Triumphalis (Triumphal Queen), or Terrae marisque Dominatrici (Mistress of sea and land). Private and public dedications associate her with agricultural deities such as Ceres, Silvanus, and the virgin goddess Diana. She is also named in some dedications of public works, such as the restoration of the Claudian Aqueduct. Most inscriptions to Bona Dea are simple and unadorned but some show serpents, often paired. Cumont (1932) remarks their similarity to the serpents featured in domestic shrines (lararia) at Pompei; serpents are associated with many earth-deities, and had protective, fertilising and regenerating functions, as in the cults of Aesculapius, Demeter and Ceres. Some Romans kept live, harmless snakes as household pets, and credited them with similarly beneficial functions.

Images of the goddess show her enthroned, clad in chiton and mantle. On her left arm she holds a cornucopia, a sign of her abundant generosity and fruitfulness. In her right hand, she holds a bowl, which feeds a serpent coiled around her right arm: a sign of her healing and regenerative powers. This combination of snake and cornucopia are unique to Bona Dea. The literary record offers at least one variation on this type; Macrobius describes her cult statue as overhung by a "spreading vine", and bearing a sceptre in her left hand.

== Cult themes in modern scholarship ==
Bona Dea's is the only known festival in which women could gather at night, drink strong, sacrificial-grade wine and perform a blood sacrifice. Although women were present at most public ceremonies and festivals, the religious authorities in Roman society were the male pontiffs and augurs, and women could not lawfully perform rites at night, unless "offered for the people in proper form". Women were allowed wine at these and other religious occasions. At other times, they might drink weak, sweetened, or diluted wine in moderation but Roman traditionalists believed that in the more distant and virtuous past, this was forbidden, "for fear that they might lapse into some disgraceful act. For it is only a step from the intemperance of Liber pater to the forbidden things of Venus". Some ancient sources infer that women were banned from offering blood-and-wine sacrifice in their own right; even banned from handling such materials; both claims are questionable. Nevertheless, the strong, sacrificial grade wine used in the rites to Bona Dea was normally reserved for Roman gods, and Roman men.

The unusual permissions implicit at these rites probably derived from the presence and religious authority of the Vestals. They were exceptional and revered persons; virgins, but not subject to their fathers' authority; and matrons, but independent of any husband. They held forms of privilege and authority otherwise associated only with Roman men, and were answerable only to the Senior Vestal and the Pontifex Maximus. Their ritual obligations and religious integrity were central to the well being of the Roman state and all its citizens.

The euphemistic naming of strong wine at this festival has been variously described as an actual substitution for milk and honey, relatively late in the cult's development; as a theological absurdity; and as an ingenious justification for behaviours that would be considered unacceptable outside this specific religious sphere. Fauna's myths illustrate the potential of wine as an agent of sexual transgression; wine was thought to be an invention of Liber-Dionysus, who was present as the male principle in certain "soft fruits", including semen and grapes; and ordinary wine was produced under the divine patronage of Venus, the goddess of love and sexual desire. Its aphrodisiac effects were well known.

For Staples, the euphemisms are agents of transformation. The designation of wine as "milk" conceives it as an entirely female product, dissociated from the sexually and morally complex realms of Venus and Liber. Likewise, the wine jar described as a "honey jar" refers to bees, which in Roman lore are sexually abstinent, virtuous females who will desert an adulterous household. Myrtle, as the sign of Venus, Faunus' lust and Fauna's unjust punishment, is simply banned; or as Versnel puts it, "Wine in, Myrtle out". The vine-leaf bowers and the profusion of plants – any and all but the forbidden myrtle – transform the sophisticated, urban banqueting hall into a "primitive" dwelling, evoking the innocence of an ancestral golden age in which women rule themselves, without reference to men or Venus, drinking "milk and honey", which are "markers par excellence of utopian golden times" – under the divine authority of Bona Dea.
