= Fauna (deity) =

Roman goddess; either the wife, sister, or daughter of Faunus

Fauna [ˈfau̯na] is a Roman rustic goddess said in differing ancient sources to be the wife, sister, or daughter of Faunus (the Roman counterpart of Pan). Varro regarded her as the female counterpart of Faunus, and said that the fauni all had prophetic powers. She is also called Fatua or Fenta Fauna.

== Name ==
=== Etymology ===
The name Fauna is a feminine form of Latin Faunus, the deity of the countryside. Faunus itself is generally thought to stem from Proto-Italic *fawe or *fawono, ultimately from Proto-Indo-European *bʰh₂u-n ('favourable'). Consequently, Georges Dumézil translated her name as "the Favourable."

In his conceptual approach to Roman deity, Michael Lipka sees Faunus and Fauna as an example of a characteristically Roman tendency to form gender-complementary pairs within a sphere of functionality. The male-female figures never have equal prominence, and one partner (not always the female) seems to have been modelled on the other. An Oscan dedication naming Fatuveís (= Fatui, genitive singular), found at Aeclanum in Irpinia, indicates that the concept is Italic. Fauna has also been dismissed as merely "an artificial construction of scholarly casuistics."

=== Ancient interpretations ===
Varro explained the role of Faunus and Fauna as prophetic deities:

Fauni are gods of the Latins, so that there is both a male Faunus and a female Fauna; there is a tradition that they used to speak of (fari) future events in wooded places using the verses they call 'Saturnians', and thus they were called 'Fauni' from 'speaking' (fando).

Servius identifies Faunus with Fatuclus, and says his wife is Fatua or Fauna, deriving the names as Varro did from fari, "to speak," "because they can foretell the future." The early Christian author Lactantius called her Fenta Fauna and said that she was both the sister and wife of Faunus; according to Lactantius, Fatua sang the fata, "fates," to women as Faunus did to men. Justin said that Fatua, the wife of Faunus, "being filled with divine spirit assiduously predicted future events as if in a madness (furor)," and thus the verb for divinely inspired speech is fatuari.

While several etymologists in antiquity derived the names Fauna and Faunus from fari, "to speak," Macrobius regarded Fauna's name as deriving from faveo, favere, "to favor, nurture," "because she nurtures all that is useful to living creatures." According to Macrobius, the Books of the Pontiffs (pontificum libri) treated Bona Dea, Fauna, Ops, and Fatua as names for the same goddess, Maia.

== See also ==
- List of Roman deities
