= Aventine Hill =

One of the seven hills of Rome, Italy

Coordinates: 41°53′N 12°29′E

- One of the seven hills of Rome
- Latin name: Collis Aventinus
- Italian name: Aventino
- Rione: Ripa
- People: Ancus Marcius, Lucius Vorenus, Lucius Opimius, Marcus Fulvius Flaccus, Naevius, Pope Sixtus III
- Events: Aventine Secession (494 BC), Aventine Secession (20th century)
- Ancient Roman religion: Temples to Diana, Ceres, Liber and Libera, Bona Dea.

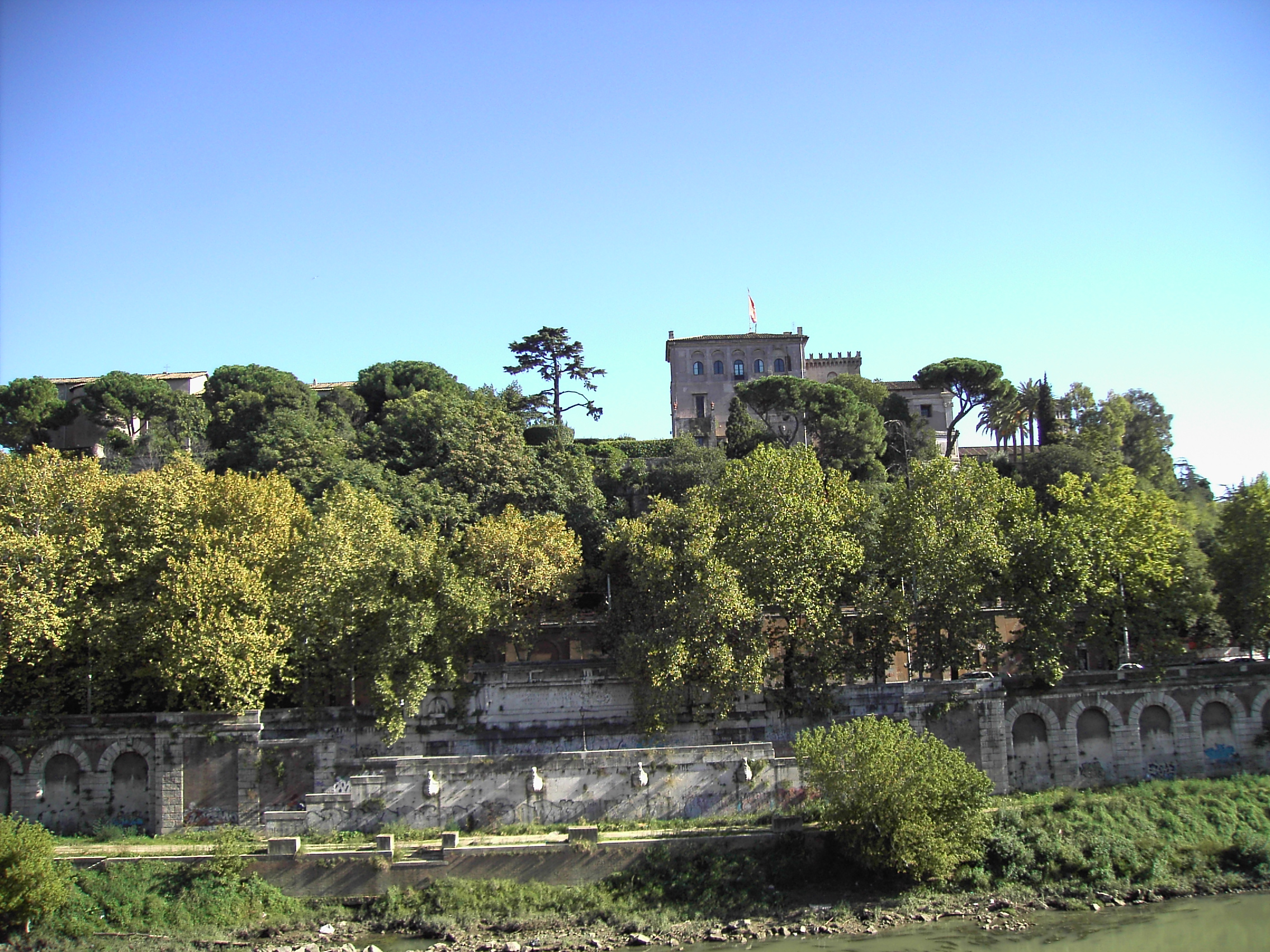
Ripa: the Aventine towards the Tiber, with the palace of the Knights of Malta

The Aventine Hill (/ˈævɪntaɪn, -tɪn/ AV-in-tyne, -tin; Latin: Collis Aventinus; Italian: Aventino [avenˈtiːno]) is one of the Seven Hills on which ancient Rome was built. It belongs to Ripa, the modern twelfth rione, or ward, of Rome.

== Location and boundaries ==
Schematic map of Rome showing the seven hills and Servian Wall.

The Aventine Hill is the southernmost of Rome's seven hills. It has two distinct heights, one greater to the northwest (Aventinus Major) and one lesser to the southeast (Aventinus Minor), divided by a steep cleft that provides the base for an ancient roadway between the heights. During the Republican era, the two hills may have been recognized as a single entity.

The Augustan reforms of Rome's urban neighbourhoods (vici) recognised the ancient road between the two heights (the modern Viale Aventino) as a common boundary between the new Regio XIII, which absorbed Aventinus Maior, and the part of Regio XII known as Aventinus Minor.

== Etymology and mythology ==
Most Roman sources trace the name of the hill to a legendary king Aventinus. Servius identifies two kings of that name, one ancient Italic, and one Alban, both said to have been buried on the hill in remote antiquity. Servius believes that the hill was named after the ancient Italic king Aventinus. He rejects Varro's proposition that the Sabines named the hill after the nearby Avens river (modern-day Velino); likewise, he believes that the Aventinus who was fathered by Hercules on Rhea Silvia was likely named after the Aventine Hill.

The Aventine was a significant site in Roman mythology. In Virgil's Aeneid, a cave on the Aventine's rocky slope next the river is home to the monstrous Cacus, killed by Hercules for stealing Geryon's cattle. In Rome's founding myth, the divinely fathered twins Romulus and Remus hold a contest of augury, whose outcome determines the right to found, name and lead a new city, and to determine its site. In most versions of the story, Remus sets up his augural tent on the Aventine; Romulus sets his up on the Palatine.

Each sees a number of auspicious birds (aves) that signify divine approval but Remus sees fewer than Romulus. Romulus goes on to found the city of Rome at the site of his successful augury. An earlier variant, found in Ennius and some later sources, has Romulus perform his augury on one of the Aventine Hills. Remus performs his elsewhere, perhaps on the southeastern height, the lesser of the Aventine's two hills, which has been tentatively identified with Ennius' Mons Murcus.

Skutsch (1961) regards Ennius' variant as the most likely, with Romulus's Palatine augury as a later development, after common usage had extended the Aventine's name – formerly used for only the greater, northeastern height – to include its lesser neighbour. Augural rules and the mythos itself required that each twin take his auspices at a different place; therefore Romulus, who won the contest and founded the city, was repositioned to the more fortunate Palatine, the traditional site of Rome's foundation. The less fortunate Remus, who lost not only the contest but later, his life, remained on the Aventine: Servius notes the Aventine's reputation as a haunt of "inauspicious birds".

== History ==
=== Roman ===
According to Roman tradition, the Aventine was not included within Rome's original foundation, and lay outside the city's ancient sacred boundary (pomerium). The Roman historian Livy reports that Ancus Marcius, Rome's fourth king, defeated the Latins of Politorium, and resettled them on the Aventine. The Roman geographer Strabo credits Ancus with the building of a city wall to incorporate the Aventine. Others credit the same wall to Rome's sixth king, Servius Tullius. The remains known as the Servian Wall used stone quarried at Veii, which was not conquered by Rome until c.393 BC, so the Aventine might have been part-walled, or an extramural suburb.

The Aventine appears to have functioned as some kind of staging post for the legitimate ingress of foreign peoples and foreign cults into Rome. During the late regal era, Servius Tullius built a temple to Diana on the Aventine, as a Roman focus for the new-founded Latin League. At some time around 493 BC, soon after the expulsion of Rome's last King and the establishment of the Roman Republic, the Roman Senate provided a temple for the so-called Aventine Triad of Ceres, Liber and Libera, patron deities of the Roman commoners or plebs; the dedication followed one of the first in a long series of threatened or actual plebeian secessions. The temple overlooked the Circus Maximus and the Temple of Vesta, and faced the Palatine Hill. It became an important repository for plebeian and senatorial records. The Aventine's outlying position, its longstanding association with Latins and plebeians and its extra-pomerial position reflect its early marginal status.

It is presumed that the Aventine was public land, owned by the state on behalf of the Roman people. In c.456 BC a Lex Icilia allowed or granted the plebs property rights there. By c.391 BC, the city's overspill had overtaken the Aventine and the Campus Martius, and left the city vulnerable to attack; around that year, the Gauls overran and temporarily held the city. After this, the walls were rebuilt or extended to properly incorporate the Aventine; this is more or less coincident with the increasing power and influence of the Aventine-based plebeian aediles and tribunes in Roman public affairs, and the rise of a plebeian nobility.

Rome absorbed many more foreign deities via the Aventine: "No other location approaches [its] concentration of foreign cults". In 392 BC, Camillus established a Temple of Juno Regina. Later introductions include Summanus, c. 278, Vortumnus c. 264, and at some time before the end of the 3rd century, Minerva.

==== Imperial era ====
In the imperial era the character of the hill changed and it became the seat of numerous aristocratic residences, including the private houses of Trajan and Hadrian before they became emperors and of Lucius Licinius Sura, friend of Trajan who built the private Baths of Licinius Sura. The emperor Vitellius and the Praefectus urbi Lucius Fabius Cilo also lived there at the time of Septimius Severus. The Aventine was also the site of the Baths of Decius, built in 252.

This new character of an aristocratic neighbourhood was probably the cause of its total destruction during the sack of Rome by Alaric I in 410.

The poorer population had meanwhile moved further south, to the plain near the port (Emporium) and to the other bank of the Tiber.

=== Modern period ===
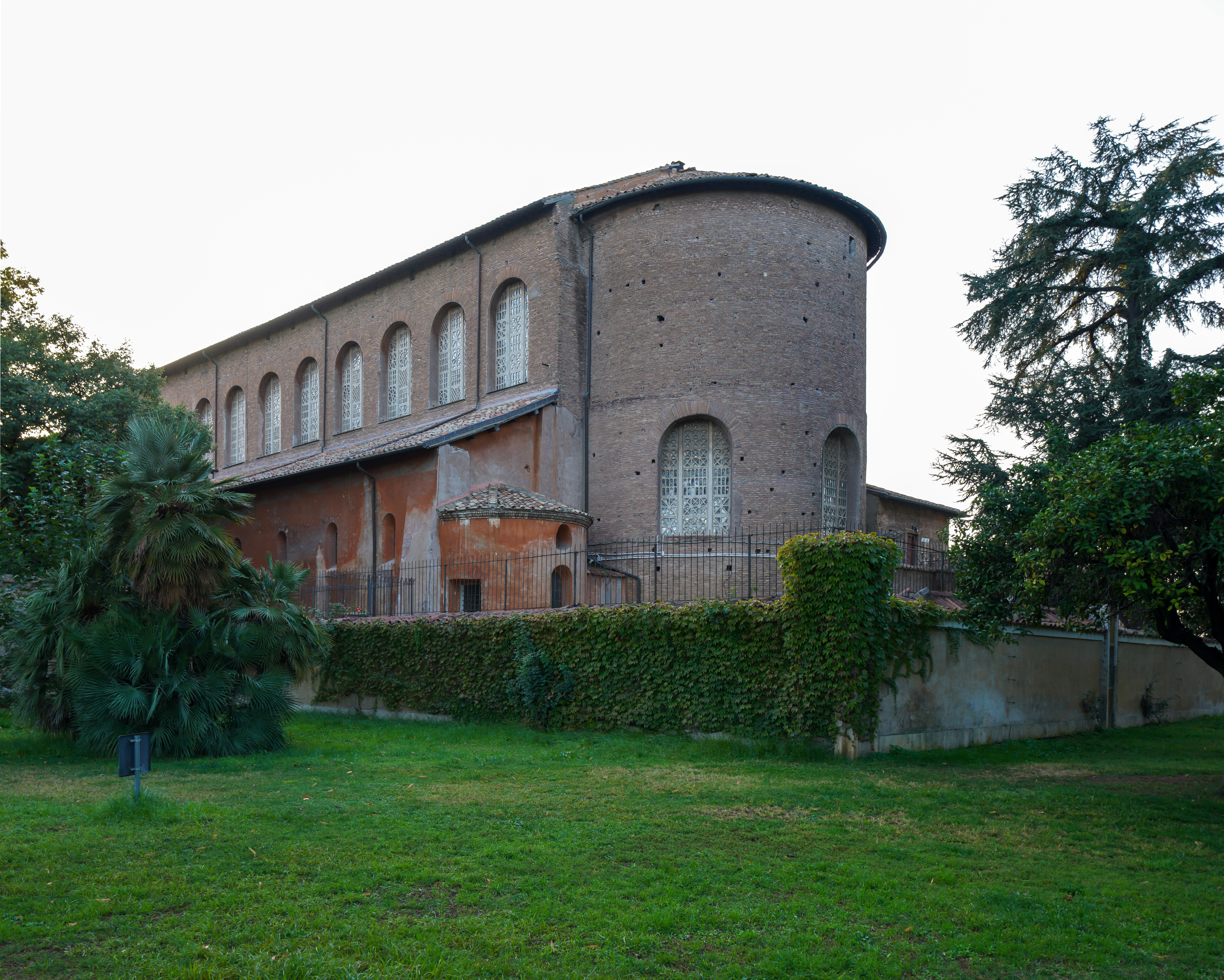
Basilica Santa Sabina

During the Fascist period, many deputies of the opposition retired on this hill after the murder of Giacomo Matteotti, here ending—by the so-called "Aventine Secession"—their presence at the Parliament and, as a consequence, their political activity.

The hill is now an elegant residential part of Rome with a wealth of architectural interest, including palaces, churches, and gardens, for example, the basilica of Santa Sabina, Santi Bonifacio ed Alessio and the Rome Rose Garden.

== Cultural references ==
The Aventine Hill is portrayed as a rough working-class area of ancient Rome in the popular Falco series of historical novels written by Lindsey Davis about Marcus Didius Falco, a 'private informer' who occasionally works for the Emperor Vespasian and lives in the Aventine.

The same image is portrayed in much of the series Rome, in which the Aventine is the home of Lucius Vorenus. In season two, Vorenus and his friend legionary Titus Pullo seek to maintain order over the various collegia competing there for power.

The Vesta-class of starships in the Star Trek novels are named for Rome's seven hills. The most featured ship is the U.S.S. Aventine under Captain Ezri Dax.

In the British television series, Plebs, the neighbourhood in which the three main plebs live is depicted as the Aventine.

== See also ==
- Forum Pistorium
- Temple of Bona Dea

Seven hills

- Seven hills of Rome
- Caelian Hill (Celio)
- Capitoline Hill (Capitolino)
- Esquiline Hill (Esquilino)
- Palatine Hill (Palatino)
- Quirinal Hill (Quirinale)
- Viminal Hill (Viminale)

Other Roman hills

- Janiculum Hill (Gianicolo)
- Monte Mario
- Cispian Hill (Cispio)
- Oppian Hill (Oppio)
- Pincian Hill (Pincio)
- Vatican Hill (Vaticano)
- Velian Hill (Velia)
