= Männerbund =

Indo-European youthful warrior-bands

The Männerbund (German for 'alliance of men') is a hypothesised Proto-Indo-European institution in which unmarried young males, initiated together as an age-class, served in a band of warriors before their full integration into society. Its members lived outside the community for several years, living by raiding and hunting, and were reintegrated as adult men through a rite of passage. The Proto-Indo-European language includes the reconstructed term *kóryos, meaning 'war-band', but whether this term would have been used to refer to such an institution remains uncertain.

Early research on the concept focused on Germanic initiation rites, notably with Otto Höfler, and was extended to ancient India and Iran by Stig Wikander. Because of the circulation of these theories in völkisch and Nazi circles, the concept fell into disrepute after the Second World War. It was revived within Indo-European studies from the 1980s, following works by Harry Falk (1986) and Kim McCone (1987), and has since become a recurrent subject of comparative research.

Reconstructions draw on traditions from several branches of the family, including the Vedic Vrātyas and Maruts, Scythian and Ossetian raiding expeditions, the Greek ephebeia and krypteia, the Irish fianna, the Germanic berserkers and the Italic ver sacrum. In these models, members of the band identified with wolves or dogs, took animal names and fought in a state of frenzy. They were associated with nudity, darkness and night attacks, and were permitted acts forbidden at home, such as theft and sexual licence, as long as these were not directed against their own community. David W. Anthony and Kristian Kristiansen have used the model to interpret archaeological evidence, such as the midwinter dog and wolf sacrifices at Krasnosamarskoe in the early 2nd millennium BC, and to explain the male-dominated Indo-European migrations.

Debate continues over how far the institution can be projected back in time. Stefan Zimmer argues that the comparative evidence refers to distinct institutions from different periods and cannot support a single Proto-Indo-European system. J. P. Mallory holds that Celtic and Germanic comparisons allow the war-band to be posited at least in the western part of the Indo-European world, but warns against treating it as a static institution of great antiquity. Mikkel Nørtoft has suggested that the association between young warriors and dogs may have spread only from around 2000 BC, with chariotry and horseback riding, rather than being inherited from the proto-language.

== Historiography ==
=== Terminology ===
In Indo-European studies, the modern German term Männerbund (literally 'alliance of men') has been traditionally used to refer to the concept. The term was first coined by German academics in the early 20th century to refer to a type of war-band among the Germanic peoples, and was later adopted by international scholars to describe similar groups in other cultures, particularly within Indo-European traditions.

Some writers, including Harry Falk, Jan N. Bremmer and Stefan Zimmer, argue that it can be misleading since the war-bands used in reconstructions were made up of adolescent males, not grown-up men. Other terms have been proposed as preferable alternatives, including Bruderschaft ('fraternity, brotherhood'), Jugendbünde ('youth group'), Jungmannschaft ('young [group of] men'), and 'black youths'.

=== Invention of the concept ===
The concept was developed in the early 20th century by scholars such as Heinrich Schurtz (1902), Hans Blüher (1917), Lily Weiser-Aall (1927), Georges Dumézil (1929), Richard Wolfram (1932), Robert Stumpfl (1934), Otto Höfler (1934), Stig Wikander (1938), and Henri Jeanmaire (1939).

Early research on the Männerbund begins with Heinrich Schurtz's Altersklassen und Männerbünde (1902), which emphasised the role of men's secret societies in traditional cultures. Schurtz's work, together with Lily Weiser-Aall's ideas of male association among early Germanic peoples, later shaped German and Austrian scholarship, led by Otto Höfler, on Germanic and Scandinavian initiation rites, often grounded in assumptions of Germanic continuity. From the late 1930s, Höfler's concepts of secret cultic societies also informed Scandinavian scholarship, including that of Stig Wikander, who posited comparable institutions in ancient Indian and Iranian contexts.

These theories circulated within German Völkisch movements in the period 1900–1920s due to the mystification of Germanic cults of the dead, then within Nazi intellectual circles during the 1930–1940s. Recent research has highlighted the far-right ideological foundations of most of the early studies. Höﬂer, in particular, was affiliated with the SS Ahnenerbe, and his theories were generally received favourably by the Nazis. Owing to these associations, Männerbünd theories fell into academic disrepute after the Second World War.

=== Modern research ===
From the 1980s onward, the Männerbund theory has been the subject of renewed critical examination within Indo-European studies, with major contributions by Harry Falk (1986), Kim McCone (1987), Bruce Lincoln (1991), Priscilla K. Kershaw (2000), Michael P. Speidel (2002), Gerhard Meiser (2002) and James P. Mallory (2006). Scholars have identified possible survivals of Männerbund-type institutions in Germanic, Indo-Iranian, Greek, Roman, Celtic, and Balto-Slavic traditions, although debate persists over which features can legitimately be assigned to the Proto-Indo-European period (c. 4500–2500 BC) and which result from later diffusion among Indo-European-speaking groups. While the term *kóryos itself can be reliably traced to the Proto-Indo-European language, it is also not clear if it should be associated to the concept of Männerbund.

Kim McCone, whose 1987 study is often credited with initiating modern research on the subject, argues that there is "sufficient lexical and certainly structural correspondences to reconstruct a [Proto-Indo-European] 'war-band' comprising an age set of young unmarried and landless (but free) men who lived off the land, engaged in predatory activities, had a particular association with wolves (less so, dogs or bears), were famous for their berserkr-like behaviour in battle, and might form the 'shock troops' in military engagements".

On the basis of ethnographic evidence, Gerhard Meiser (2002) summarised several recurring features of youthful war-bands in Indo-European traditions. These groups consisted of adolescent males initiated together as an age cohort, typically from prominent families. They were sent away to live outside their own society for a number of years as landless youths, possessing nothing but their weapons. In this liminal condition, they were permitted to raid, steal, and take sexual license with women of other groups without incurring the legal penalties they would face at home, while their activities focused on military training, heroic recitation, and attacks on outsiders. They wore animal skins, adopted wolf- or dog-like behaviour, and often bore names with canine or lupine elements, reflecting symbolic ties to death, liminality, fecundity, and sexual license.

=== Criticism and limits ===
Critics such as Stefan Zimmer are sceptical of attempts to derive a unified system from sources that span different periods. He argues that the evidence used in reconstructions of the Männerbund refers to a range of distinct institutions, all loosely connected to the broader notion of a 'war band'. According to Zimmer, such groups "may well have been part of [Proto-Indo-European] social life, and may be postulated with good reason, but this assumption can in no way be considered probable, as the sources simply are insufficient to bear the weight of argument needed".

J. P. Mallory also cautions that youthful war-bands cannot be reconstructed as a static, millennia-old institution, an issue reflected in the wide variation of the comparative evidence, and notes the lack of archaeological data for dog-identified warriors, a gap that recent research has sought to address. Mallory writes that "on the basis of Celtic-Germanic comparisons, one can posit the specific institution of the war-band in at least the western periphery of the Indo-European world. To what extent it may be ascribed to a broader region or an earlier antiquity in Indo-European depends on what further evidence can be adduced. The existence of cognate terms in Baltic, Greek and Iranian would at least indicate that the [word] *korios itself is of Proto-Indo-European antiquity".

According to Mikkel Nørtoft, it is possible that the link between young male warrior institutions and dogs attributed by some scholars to the Proto-Indo-European period (4500–2500 BC) may have emerged only after the Corded Ware period, spreading with chariotry and horseback riding from around 2000 BC in connection with the Sintashta, Andronovo, and Srubnaya cultures. In this model, the historical and mythological accounts of dog-warrior groups may represent later cultural diffusion across the Indo-European-speaking world through expanding long-distance trade and marriage networks among elites.

== Cultural reconstruction ==
Scholars have proposed that a reconstructed Indo-European warrior institution, commonly referred to as a Männerbund or *koryos, is reflected in early Indo-European myths and poetry that articulate a 'warrior ideology' linking dogs and wolves with death, warfare, and youthful war-bands.

These formations are described as landless brotherhoods, made up of unmarried adolescent males organised under a senior leader. Positioned on the margins of society, they adopted 'wolf-like' predatory behaviour and survived by raiding until reintegration into the community through cleansing rites of passage upon reaching adulthood. In this model, young male boys are initiated into a wolf- or dog-warrior sodality and live a savage life raiding their surroundings until they reach adulthood, shed their wolf/dog skin in a sacrificial rite, and re-enter society. Such highly mobile groups are interpreted as capable of undertaking high-risk migrations to acquire livestock, goods, territory, wives, and personal prestige, and this behaviour has been proposed as a contributing factor to the Indo-European migrations.

=== Reconstructed noun ===
The reconstructed Proto-Indo-European (PIE) term *kóryos denotes a 'people under arms' and has been translated as 'army, war-band, unit of warriors', as 'detachment, war party', or as 'pertaining to [military] division, war-band'. Although the word is attested in several branches of the Indo-European language family, its link to a putative Indo-European Männerbund remains uncertain. In the words of scholar J. P. Mallory, the concept "does at least occasionally intersect with the lexical evidence of the *koros ~ *koryos".

The term *kóryos is built on the PIE stem *kóro- ('cutting, section, division'), attested in Old Persian as kāra 'people, army' (Persian: کاروان, romanized: kāravān, lit. 'troupe') and in Lithuanian as kãras 'war, army'. Proto-Germanic *skarō ('crowd, military division') may also be etymologically related. (Note: Old High German scar(a) 'troop, group of armed men', Old Saxon scara 'feudal service, troop', Middle Dutch sc(h)are 'division, cohort; crowd', Old Norse skǫr 'close-knit group'.) Kim McCone suggests that *kóro- may derive from a PIE root *(s)ker- ('cut [down]'), with *kóryos originally representing the substantivised form of an adjective meaning 'engaged in death/war' or 'belonging to the division'. Birgit Anette Olsen instead derives *kóro- from a PIE root *(s)kerh- ('divide').

Cognates of *kóryos are found across several Indo-European languages: Baltic *kāryas 'army', (Note: Old Prussian kargis 'army' and caryago 'military campaign'; Lithuanian kãrias 'war, army, regiment'; Latvian karš 'war, army'.) Celtic *koryos 'troop, tribe', (Note: Gaulish corios 'troop, army'; Middle Irish cuire 'troop, host'; Welsh cordd 'tribe, clan', Old Breton -cor.) and Germanic *harjaz 'host, troop, army, raiding party'. (Note: Gothic harjis 'army'; Old Norse herr 'army'; Old English here 'army'; Old High German hari 'army, crowd'; Old Saxon heri 'army'.) Other possible parallels include the Italic personal name Coriolānus and toponym Corioli, as well the Ancient Greek element Koro- (Κορο-), found in personal names such as Κορούμαχος ('korio-fighter'). (Note: The stem -korio- also appears in personal names, such as Macedonian Κόρραγος, and Thessalian Κορρίμαχος and Μενέκορρος ('who withstands a [foreign] army').) The absence of cognates in Anatolian languages may suggest that the distinction between larger organised armed groups (*tewtéh_{2}- 'the tribe, people under arms') and smaller, self-governing youth groups emerged only after the Anatolian split, within Core Indo-European.

In west-central Indo-European dialects, the derivative *koryonos ('leader of the *kóryos'), formed with the suffix -nos ('master of'), is reflected in Ancient Greek koíranos 'army-leader', Old Norse Herjan (< PGmc *harjanaz 'army-leader'), and Brittonic Coriono-totae 'people of the army-leader'. (Note: An Iranian personal name Κηρπáτης, found in Galatia, is interpreted by D. Weber as *kār(i̯)a-pati 'lord of the troop'. Perhaps also Old Phrygian kuryaneyon = κοιρανων? According to West, "there is no clear representative of this lexical group in Indo-Iranian, but it was evidently pan-European.") Olsen notes that the distinction between the youth band (*kóryos) and the established society (*tewtéh_{2}-) is mirrored in the parallel formations for their leaders: *koryonos and *tewtéh_{2}-nos ('master of the people'; cf. Gothic þiudans 'king').

=== Rite of passage ===
According to scholarly reconstructions, those war bands were generally composed of young, unmarried adolescent males, usually coming from prominent families and initiated together into manhood as an age-class cohort. They are thought to have undergone painful trials to enter the group before being sent away to live as landless warriors in the wild for a number of years, within a group presumably ranging from two to twelve members. The young males went without possession other than their weapons, living on the edges of their host society. On the basis on later Indo-European traditions, the leader of the band (the *koryonos) is hypothesised to have been designated by a game of dice, a result viewed as the gods' choice, with the other members pledging loyalty to him. He may have been regarded as their master in the rite of passage and, symbolically, as their 'employer' since the young warriors served as his protectors.

Their activities have been understood as seasonal, with the young men returning to their home community for part of the year. Their life was centred on military duties, hunting wild animals, and raiding settlements, as well as on the recitation of heroic poetry recounting the deeds of past warriors and cattle-raiding legends. A tradition of epic poetry celebrating heroic and violent warriors conquering loot and territories, portrayed as possessions the gods wanted them to have, may have reinforced the social legitimacy of violent behaviour within the Männerbund. Acts normally forbidden, such as stealing, raiding, or sexually assaulting women, were therefore tolerated amongst their members, so long as they were not directed against their own community.

The Männerbund was symbolically associated with death and liminality, but also with fecundity and sexual license. As originally proposed by McCone, this initiation period has been understood by scholars as a transitional stage preceding the status of adult warrior, and was usually crowned by marriage in later traditions. McCone argues that members of those war-bands initially served as young unmarried males without possessions before their eventual incorporation into the *tewtéh_{2}- ('the tribe, people under arms'), composed of the property-owning and married adult males. Birgit Anette Olsen further suggests that their military role likely continued into organised armed groups within society in adulthood, until they reached the status of *gérh₁ontes ('elders'), no longer fit for combat.

David W. Anthony postulates that, in Europe, such oath-bound initiatory war-bands were gradually absorbed by increasingly powerful patrons and kings during the Iron Age. In ancient India, they declined in status with the rise of the Brahmin caste, resulting in their eventual demise.

=== Wolf-like behaviour ===
Reconstructed Indo-European war-bands are described as symbolic 'shape-shifters', whose members wore animal skins to assume the nature of wolves or dogs. The symbolism of the Männerbund is rooted in wolf imagery, idealising traits such as violence, trickery, swiftness, great strength, and warrior frenzy. Because of these qualities and the notion of bestial possession, the band is frequently compared to a pack of dogs or, more typically, wolves.

By identifying with wild animals, initiates perceived themselves as physically and legally moved outside the human world, and therefore no longer restrained by social taboos. Upon returning to normal life, they would feel no guilt for breaking the rules of their home society, because they had not been humans, or at least were not living in the cultural space of their home society when those acts were committed.

Members of such bands adopted names with wolf or dog elements, animals linked to death and the Otherworld in Indo-European belief. This renaming may have marked the initiatory transition into the war-band, and could help explain the prevalence of canine, especially lupine, elements in the personal names of Indo-European anthroponymy. For instance, the Irish hero Cú Chulainn receives a new name meaning 'the hound of Culann' in his own initiation, replacing his childhood name.

According to Aleksandar Loma, the practice of wolf-imitation in training may go back to the late Palaeolithic, but its contrast with equestrian warfare, as attested in later Indo-European traditions, could only have arisen after the domestication of the horse and the invention of the light chariot among Proto-Indo-European speakers. Some individuals may have kept these initiatory names throughout their lives. Others reverted to their birth names or assumed a second 'equine' name, reflecting their new status as adult warriors fighting openly by chariot or on horseback.

Loma also notes that the folk legend of the werewolf ('man-wolf'), documented for the first time by Herodotus when reporting on the Neuri, might be reminiscent of nocturnal raids carried out by disguised warrior bands behaving wolfishly, possibly under the influence of an intoxicating substance. Similar ancient word-formations can be found in Ancient Greek luk-ánthrōpos ('wolf-man'), Proto-Germanic *wira-wulfaz ('man-wolf'), Proto-Celtic *wiro-kū ('man-dog'), and Proto-Slavic *vьlko-dlakь ('wolf-haired one'), which are often conceived to involve putting on a wolf-skin or wolf-girdle.

=== Warrior-fury ===
A conflicting opposition between death and vulnerability is suggested by the attributes frequently associated with the Männerbund: great strength, resistance to pain, and lack of fear. The typical state of warrior fury or frenzy was supposed to increase his strength above natural expectations, with ecstatic performances accentuated by dances and perhaps by the use of drugs. The Indo-European term for a 'mad attack' (*eis) is common to the Vedic, Germanic, and Iranian traditions.

The Germanic berserkers were depicted as practitioners of the battle fury ('going berserk', berserksgangr). The martial fury of the Homeric warrior was called lyssa, a derivation of lykos ('wolf'), as if the soldiers temporarily become wolves in their mad rage. As such, young males were perceived as dangers even to their host society. The Maruts, a group of storm deities of the Vedic tradition, were portrayed as both beneficial and dangerous entities.

The Irish hero Cúchulainn becomes a terrorising figure among the inhabitants of the capital-city, Emain Macha, after he beheaded three rivals from his own people, the Ulaid. Aiming to appease his fury, they decide to capture him and plunge his body into basins of water in order to 'cool him down'. Irish sources also describe some of the warrior-bands as savages (díberg), living like wolves by pillaging and massacring. Similarly, some Greek warrior-bands were called hybristḗs (ὑβριστή) and portrayed as violent and insolent groups of ransomers and looters.

=== Nudity ===
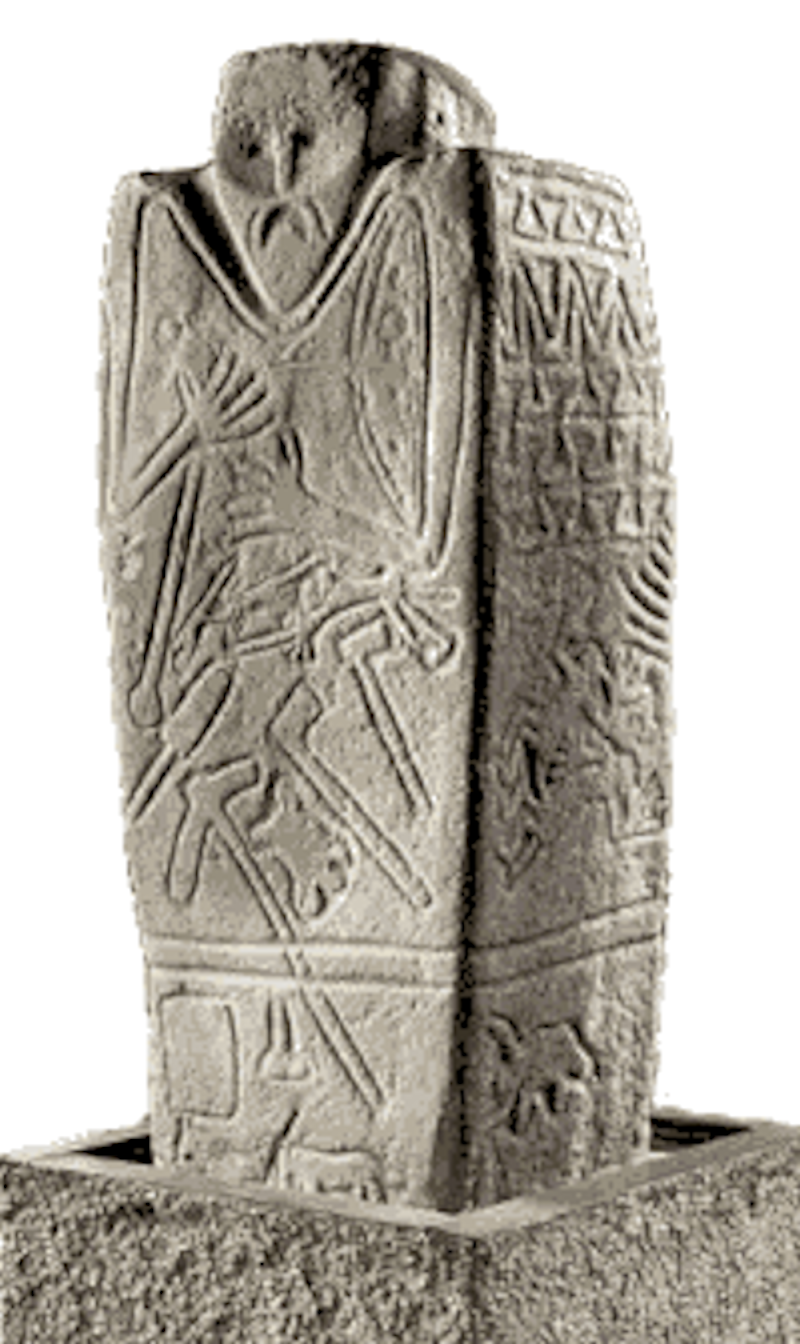
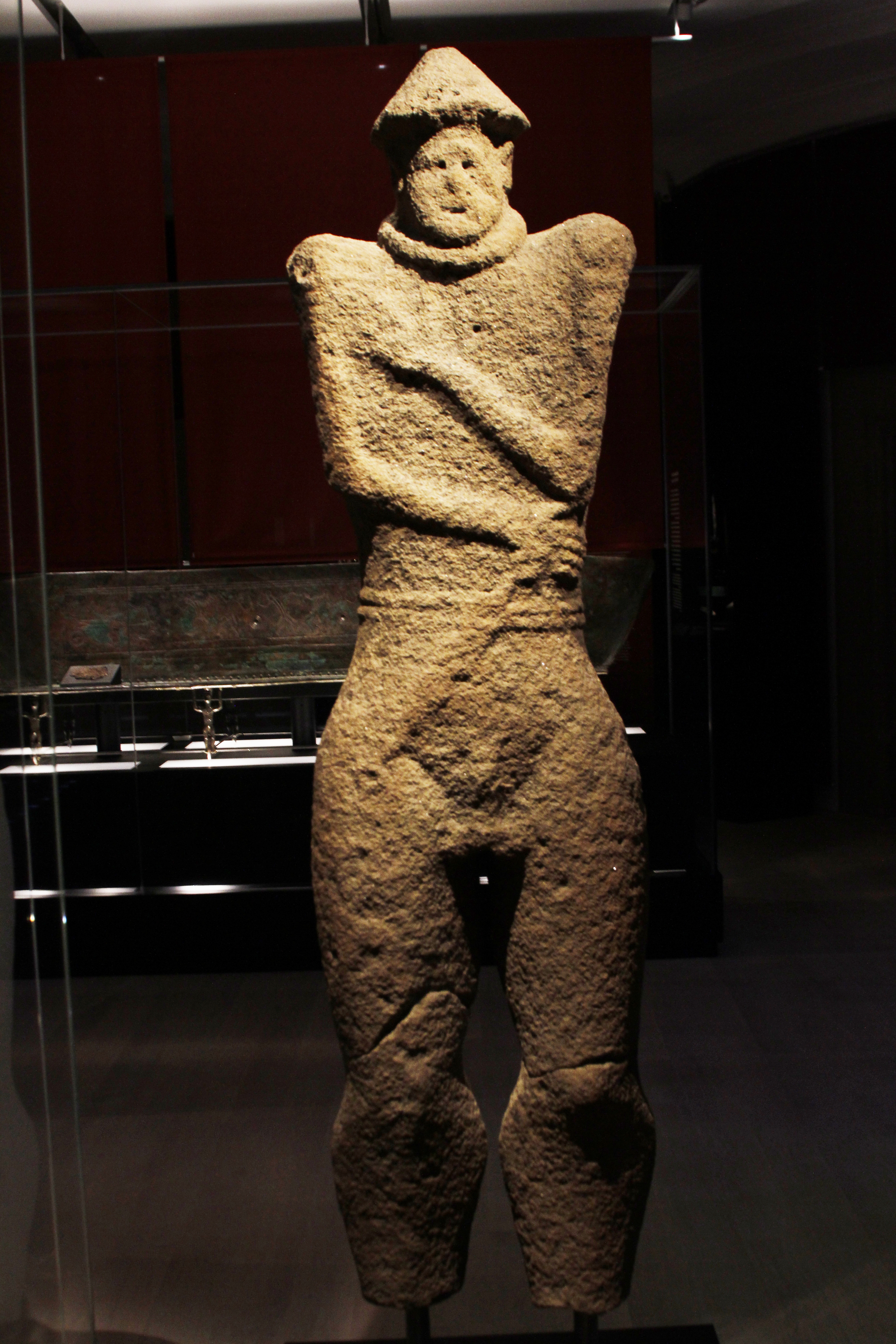
The Yamnaya Kernosovskiy idol, depicting a naked warrior with a belt, axes, and testicles (mid-3rd mill. BC), and the Celtic Warrior of Hirschlanden (6th c. BC), wearing only a helmet, neckband, belt, and sword.

Many kurgan stelae found in the Pontic–Caspian steppe, which are associated with the Proto-Indo-European culture, depict a naked male warrior carved on the stone with little else than a belt and his weapons. In later Indo-European traditions, Männerbund raiders likewise wore a belt that bound them to their leader and the gods, and little else.

Celtiberian statuettes from the 5th–3rd centuries BC depict naked warriors with a sword, a small round shield (caetra), a 'power belt', and sometimes a helmet. The tradition of kurgan stelae featuring warriors with a belt is also common in the Scythian cultures. Similarly, young Vedic boys wore only a belt and an animal skin during their initiation within the Männerbund.

=== Darkness ===
The Männerbund is usually associated with the colour black, or at least dark, and with the mobilization of chthonic forces. Frequent references are made to the 'black earth' or the 'dark night' in the Indo-European literature, and hunting and fighting at night appears to have been one of the distinguishing characteristics of the Männerbund.

In the Vedic tradition, the followers of Indra and Rudra wore black clothes, and the young heroes of Medieval Armenia were called 'black youths' (t'ux manuks). The 'black' Aram is the idealised figure of the Männerbund leader in Armenian myths, and his armies are said to suddenly attack adversaries 'before dawn' in the borderlands of Armenia.

The Athenian ephebes traditionally wore a black chlamys, and the Ancient Greek tradition featured an initiation ritual imposed upon young males in which 'black hunters' were sent out to the frontier to perform military exploits. The Greek model of the black hunter, Meleager, is named after the word for 'black' (melas), and the Armenian name Aram stems from the root *rē-mo- ('dirt, soot').

=== Role in Indo-European migrations ===
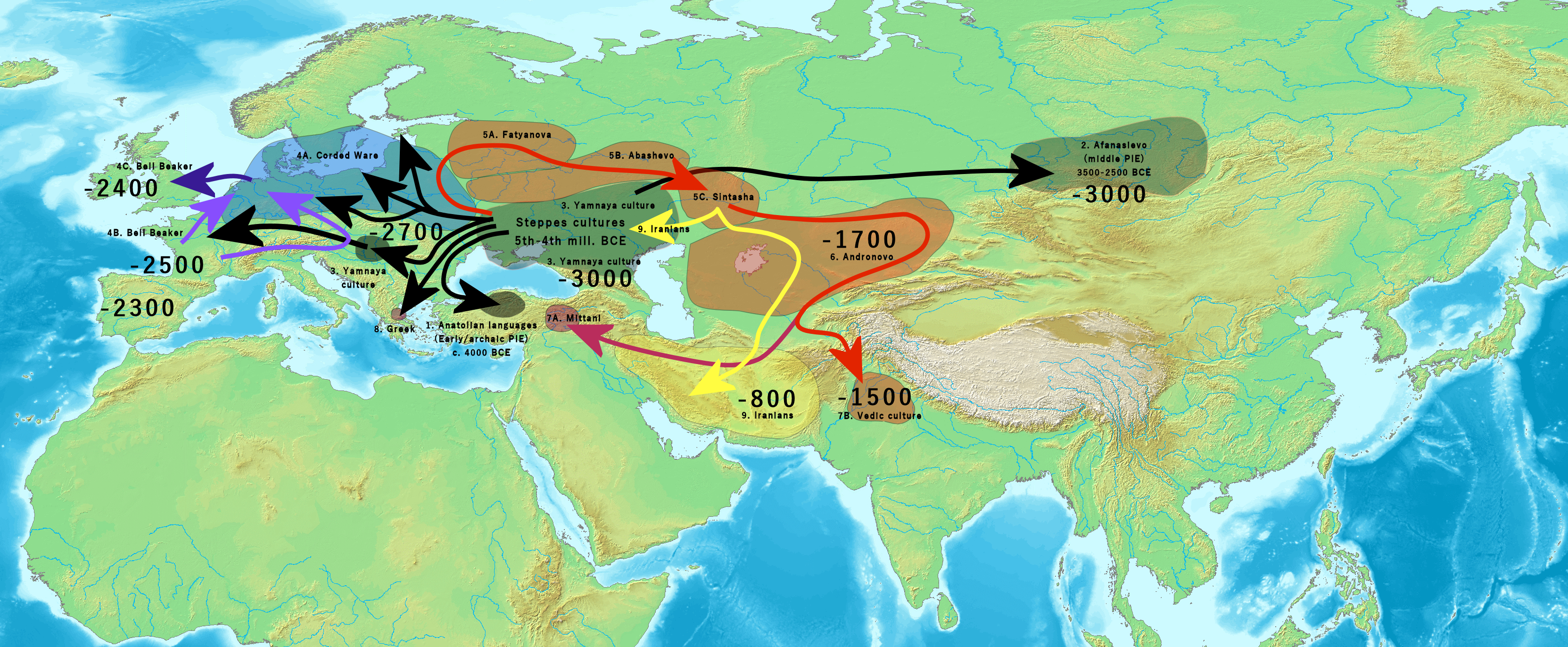
Early Indo-European migrations from the Pontic–Caspian steppe spread Yamnaya Steppe pastoralist ancestry and Indo-European languages across large parts of Eurasia.

Scholars have argued that the institution of the Männerbund played a key role during the Indo-European migrations and the diffusion of Indo-European languages across most of western Eurasia. Raids headed by those young warriors could have led to the establishment of new settlements on foreign lands, preparing the ground for the larger migration of whole tribes including old men, women and children.

Kristian Kristiansen has proposed that a warrior-training institution within early Indo-European societies may help explain the predominantly male migrations from the steppe into Europe and their role, through exogamic relations, in the formation of the Corded Ware culture. This scenario is supported by archaeological data from the early Single Grave culture, an offshoot of the Corded Ware culture in Jutland, where 90 per cent of all burials belonged to males in what appears to be a 'colonial' expansion on the territory of the Funnelbeaker culture.

David W. Anthony writes that the Männerbund may have served "as an organization promoting group cohesion and effectiveness in combat, as an instrument of external territorial expansion, and as a regulatory device in chiefly feast-centred economies". In this view, the Männerbund probably drove people not protected by the Indo-European social umbrella, to move under it, in order to obtain safety or restitution from thieving and raiding. They could therefore have served as an incentive for the recruitment of outsiders into social positions that offered vertical mobility, horizontal reciprocity, and the possibility of immortality through praise poetry, made more attractive by generosity at patron-sponsored public feasts.

== Proposed attestations ==
Scholars have drawn on the following examples from documented Indo-European-speaking cultures to reconstruct the concept of the Männerbund. This approach has been criticised by other experts like Stefan Zimmer, who argues that the sources reference various distinct institutions from different time periods, all loosely connected to the general concept of a 'war band'.

=== Krasnosamarskoe ===
Archeologist Kristian Kristiansen and anthropologist David W. Anthony have proposed to apply the Männerbund theory to archaeological sites, in particular to the formation of the Corded Ware Culture and to a steppe site near Samara from the early 2nd millennium BC.

At Krasnosamarskoe, at the middle Volga just east of Samara, were found 51 dogs and 7 wolves sacrificed and consumed in what could have been a winter-season rite of passage into a status represented metaphorically by the animals. The site is associated with the Srubnaya culture (1900–1700 BC), generally regarded as proto-Iranian, and possibly made up of archaic Iranian speakers.

Krasnosamarskoe appears to have been a place where people from around the region came to periodically engage in transgressive initiation rituals conducted in the winter and requiring dog and wolf sacrifice. According to Anthony and Brown, "it was a place of inversion, as is the eating of wolves, animal symbolic of anti-culture (a murderer 'has become like a wolf' in Hittite law; 'wolf' was used to refer to brigands and outlaws, people who stand outside the law, in many other Indo-European languages)."

The dogs found on the site seem to have been well-treated during their lifetime, and they were probably familiar pets. The ritual was centred on dog sacrifice in a region and time period when dogs were not normally eaten. Cattle and sheep were consumed throughout the year on the site. Dogs were killed almost exclusively in the winter in a regular inversion of normal dietary customs.

=== Indian tradition ===
Some Vedic families began initiating young boys at 8 years old, studying heroic poetry about past ancestors and practicing their hunting and fighting skills. At the age of 16, they were initiated into a warrior band during the winter solstice ritual (the Ekāstakā), during which the boys went into an ecstatic state, then ritually died to be reborn as dogs of war. After their leader was determined by a dice game, the initiated youths were cast away in the wild for four years to live as dogs, stealing animals, women, goods and territory, until the summer solstice ended the raiding season.

The young warriors then returned to their forest residence where they held a Vrātyastoma sacrifice to thank the gods for their success. At the end the four-year initiation, a final Vrātyastoma sacrifice was performed to transform the dog-warrior into a responsible adult man. Then, the newly-initiated males destroyed their old clothes to become human once again, ready to return to their family and to live by the rules of their host community.

The Vrātyas ('dog-priests') were known for performing the Ekāstakā ceremony at the winter solstice, when Indra, the god of war, is said to have been born with his band of Maruts, which are generally seen as representing a Vedic heavenly version of the Indo-European Männerbund. The term Vrāta is used in particular the Rigveda to describe the Maruts, the youthful band of warriors who followed Rudra, a god of wildness, hunters and death.

=== Iranian tradition ===
The Scythians likely undertook multi-year military expeditions as a mandatory stage of male initiation, as argued by Askold Ivantchik. The tradition already recorded by Herodotus presents these raids in Asia Minor as the work of warriors temporarily detached from their community, which Ivantchik compares to the Spartan krypteia, the Celtic fiann, and the Avestan mairyō.

Ossetian custom placed the balc ('military raid, expedition') at the centre of male education, with full adulthood reached only after completing three prescribed expeditions in war-bands (bal), the first marking the youth's transition to manhood and originally functioning as a prerequisite for marriage. These bands, also called k'war ('pack'), were formed during the spring festival of Styr Tūtyr, dedicated to Tutyr, the master of wolves and warriors, and their initiation rites included a ritual death and rebirth in which the boy's soul was seized by the wolf-shaped demon Udxœssœg.

=== Greek tradition ===
In Ancient Greece, the traditional war-bands lost some of the frenzy attributes that characterize shape shifters in other Indo-European cultures, but they still maintained the terror-inspiring appearance and the tricky war tactics of the original Männerbund. The wolf-symbolism has been highlighted in Greek age-set confraternities such as the Athenian ephebeia and the Spartan krypteia, whose adolescents prepared for full warrior status by using war techniques usually forbidden to the adult hoplites: prowling at night and operating covertly, and relying on trickery, traps and ambush. According to Aleksandar Loma, the lupine character of the ephebeia and krypteia reflects an original opposition between the nocturnal wolf and the solar horse of the hoplite as two successive grades in a military career.

From 17 to 20 years old, the Athenian ephebos had to live during the 2 years in the ephebeia (ἐφηβεία). Relegated to the edges of society, they were given a marginal status without a full citizenship. Their duty was to guard the limit of their community during peaceful times, generally as guards of fields, forests, and orchards. Leading ambushes and skirmishes in war time, the ephebos wore black tunics and were lightly armed. An essential part of their training was the traditional hunt, conducted at night with the use of snares and traps. In the case of the Spartan krypteia, it was even a human hunt.

The ephebos were under the patronage of the god Apollo, associated in many myths with wolves and bearing the epithet Lykeios. K. M. T. Chrimes has argued that Spartan education rested on the belief that boys were wild, or half-wild, beings who had to be treated as such until they were tamed. As such, the Spartan krypteia consisted of young men called agelai ('herds') and led by a boagos ('leader of cattle').

Reyes Bertolín Cebrián also suggests that the Lykians ('Wolf-People') mentioned by Homer may reflect some traits of Indo-European Männerbünde. In the Iliad, these groups appear as youthful war-bands distinguished by their use of animal skins, their nakedness in battle, and their menacing, otherworldly aspect.

=== Armenian tradition ===
The manuks ('young warriors') are mentioned in the story of the legendary founder of Armenia, Hayk. His descendant, Aram, interpreted as the "second image of Hayk", heads an army of 50,000 norati ('youths') warriors extending the borders of the territory on every side to create a new, superior Armenia. Contrary to Hayk, who is fighting his adversary within the territory of Armenia, Aram makes war in the borderlands and beyond the borders of Armenia. According to Armen Petrosyan, this suggests that the young warriors of Aram can be interpreted as a reflex of the Männerbund, while Hayk's soldiers may be the depiction of the adult men in arms.

=== Germanic tradition ===
Tacitus reports that among the Chatti, young warriors wore long hair and an iron ring until they had slain an enemy, rites interpreted by some modern scholars as cultic markers of an age-class transition to adult status. The ancient Harii are also mentioned by Tacitus as 'savages' wearing black shields, dyeing their bodies, and choosing dark nights for battle, and they appear to have constituted a specific warrior group rather than a tribe. Kershaw has proposed to interpret the Harii as the Männerbund of the neighbouring Lugii, and derives their name from *kóryos. Further analogies have been proposed for initiation-like practices among the Taifali, Heruli, and Lombards, and in the later Old Norse einherjar and berserkers.

David W. Anthony has observed that in the Vǫlsunga saga, Sigmund hardens his nephew Sinfjötli for later conflicts by roaming the forest with him in wolf skins, stealing and killing. In an episode comparable to the Vedic tradition, they ultimately remove and burn their wolf skins as a sign of completing the initiation and returning to the norms of the host community. Martin L. West and Michael P. Speidel further suggest to see remnants of Indo-European shape-shifters in the Norse tradition, where berserkers were sometimes called úlfheðnar ('wolf-skinned'), and the frenzy warriors wearing the skins of wolves were designated as úlfheðinn ('wolf-coat') in the Icelandic sagas.

Bernard Sergent has connected the Viking expansion with certain Männerbund traits, particularly their role as advance groups in the establishment of new settlements on foreign lands. Their three-year raiding parties were carried out by youthful war-bands led by an older adult, effectively preparing the ground for later colonisation by fully mature settlers.

=== Celtic tradition ===
The Fenian Cycle of Irish mythology centres on a band of young warriors led by Finn, the fiana, which Ivantchik compares to the Spartan krypteia. Their recruitment drew on youths willing to endure a harsh outdoor life: from May to October they lived in forests and hills, subsisting on the hunt, and from November to April they were quartered among Irish farmsteads. Admission required great physical strength, exceptional courage, and poetic skill. Kim McCone has described the fiana as "an independent organization of predominantly landless, unmarried, unsettled and young men given to hunting, warfare, and sexual licence in the wilds outside the túath [tribe, people]".

A similar pattern appears in the Irish saga Togail Bruidne Da Derga, which depicts a society of noble young warriors living a wild life (diberg) 'like wolves' (oc faelad) through raiding and killing.

Karl Peschel has compared the Männerbund to Roman accounts of soldurii and devotio, terms used for sworn companions who devoted their life to a chief in ancient Celtiberian society and among the Sotiates, reading their bond as a Celtic form of the war-retinue.

=== Italic tradition ===
Mischa Meier notes that evidence for such associations in the Roman context is extremely sparse, as the Roman state early suppressed uncontrolled secret groups, and collective age-class transitions played little role in Roman society. Nevertheless, some scholars have proposed to see minor cultic reminiscences of an Italic Männerbund tradition in the Roman ver sacrum. Sergent notes that the ver sacrum entailed the departure of an entire age group to establish a new 'colony', which he links with Männerbund-like pioneering groups in foreign settlement. In the cases of the Mamertines and the Roman ver sacrum of 217 BC, ancient sources explicitly indicate that the participants were young people.

Krešimir Vuković has also proposed that the lupercalia festival share several features with Celtic and Germanic youth-bands, including associations with horses and dogs, identification with wolves, nudity, and the wearing of metal rings. According to him, these traits correspond inversely to the prohibitions on the Brahmin and the flamen Dialis, suggesting a deliberate contrast between warrior youth-bands and priestly norms, a pattern also reflected in Vedic texts opposing the Vrātyas to the Brahmins.

== See also ==
- Berserker
- Werewolf
- Indo-European migrations
- Proto-Indo-European society
- Rite of passage
- Ver Sacrum
- Ephebos
- Krypteia
- Fianna
- Maruts
