= Donald Atkinson =

Donald Atkinson may refer to:

- Donald R. Atkinson (1940–2008), American counseling psychologist
- Donald Atkinson (archaeologist) (1886–1963), British archaeologist who led work at Venta Icenorum
- Don Atkinson, Australian rules football captain and coach of Reservoir, winners of 1947 Northern Football Netball League
- Don Atkinson, Australian actor featuring in season one of Water Rats
