= Harry Falk =

Harry Falk may refer to:

- Harry Falk (Indologist)
- Harry Falk (director)
