= Kim McCone =

British Celticist (born 1950)

- Born: Kim R. McCone; 1950 (age 75–76); London, England
- Occupations: Celticist, philologist

Academic background
- Education: University of Oxford

Academic work
- Discipline: Celtic studies
- Sub-discipline: Old and Middle Irish, Celtic historical linguistics, early Irish literature
- Institutions: St Patrick's College, Maynooth
- Notable works: Pagan Past and Christian Present in Early Irish Literature (1990)

Kim R. McCone (born 1950) is a British scholar of Celtic studies, specialising in Old and Middle Irish, Celtic historical linguistics and early Irish literature. He held the Chair of Old and Middle Irish at St Patrick's College, Maynooth, from 1982 until his retirement in 2010. He is best known for Pagan Past and Christian Present in Early Irish Literature (1990), a leading statement of the "anti-nativist" reading of medieval Irish literature.

== Education and career ==
McCone was born in London in 1950 and read classics as an undergraduate at the University of Oxford, from which he received his doctorate in 1979. Between his undergraduate and doctoral work he spent five years abroad on scholarships, two studying Indo-European linguistics at the universities of Hamburg and Freiburg and three working on Old and Middle Irish at the Dublin Institute for Advanced Studies. He was appointed to a lectureship at St Patrick's College, Maynooth, in 1979, and in 1982 succeeded Pádraig Ó Fiannachta in the Chair of Old and Middle Irish, which he held for twenty-eight years until taking early retirement in 2010. He is an honorary life member of the Linguistic Society of America.

== Work ==
=== Pagan Past and the nativist debate ===
McCone's best-known book, Pagan Past and Christian Present in Early Irish Literature (1990), is a leading statement of what became known as the "anti-nativist" reading of medieval Irish literature. Where the older "nativist" approach treated the earliest Irish sagas, law and poetry as a window onto a pre-Christian, Indo-European or Iron Age past, the anti-nativists held that these texts, being the work of Christian monastic authors, transmit a past mediated and even created in terms of a Christian vision. Jonathan Wooding traces the current to James Carney's Studies in Irish Literature and History (1955) and to the demonstration by Donnchadh Ó Corráin, Liam Breatnach and Aidan Breen, in 1984, that strata of Irish law long held to be archaic in fact contained calques of Latin canon law. The 1989 Festschrift for Carney, co-edited by McCone, Wooding describes as "something of an anti-nativist celebration". The older nativist consensus had been associated with Gerard Murphy, Myles Dillon, Daniel Binchy and Kenneth Jackson, and with the Dumézilian readings of Alwyn Rees and Proinsias Mac Cana.

The book drew criticism. In reviews published in 1996, David Dumville and Patrick Sims-Williams argued that the anti-nativist case had built a "straw man" of the nativist sympathiser, Dumville going so far as to label Mac Cana an "arch-nativist". Ó Corráin himself faulted McCone in 1994 for readmitting Indo-European material "in the form of tri-functionalism, wolf-men, fire cults and the like", a remark aimed in part at McCone's reading of the fían as a reflex of the Indo-European warrior band, or Männerbund. Wooding, while granting the heuristic value of the approach, regards anti-nativism as philosophically "scarcely a defensible position" and reads the debate as shaped by the cultural politics of twentieth-century Ireland.

=== Celtic historical linguistics ===
Alongside his work on literature McCone published widely on Celtic historical linguistics and the Old Irish language. His books in this field include The Early Irish Verb (1987, second edition 1997), Towards a Relative Chronology of Ancient and Medieval Celtic Sound Change (1996), A First Old Irish Grammar and Reader (2005) and The Origins and Development of the Insular Celtic Verbal Complex (2006).

== Selected works ==
- McCone, Kim (1987). The Early Irish Verb. Maynooth Monographs 1 (2nd, 1997 ed.). Maynooth: An Sagart.
- Ó Corráin, Donnchadh; Breatnach, Liam; McCone, Kim, eds. (1989). Sages, Saints and Storytellers: Celtic Studies in Honour of Professor James Carney. Maynooth Monographs 2. Maynooth: An Sagart.
- McCone, Kim (1990). Pagan Past and Christian Present in Early Irish Literature. Maynooth Monographs 3. Maynooth: An Sagart.
- McCone, Kim; et al., eds. (1994). Stair na Gaeilge: in ómós do Pádraig Ó Fiannachta (in Irish). Maynooth: Roinn na Sean-Ghaeilge, Coláiste Phádraig.
- McCone, Kim; Simms, Katharine, eds. (1996). Progress in Medieval Irish Studies. Maynooth: Department of Old Irish, St Patrick's College.
- McCone, Kim (1996). Towards a Relative Chronology of Ancient and Medieval Celtic Sound Change. Maynooth Studies in Celtic Linguistics 1. Maynooth: Department of Old Irish, St Patrick's College.
- McCone, Kim (2000). Echtrae Chonnlai and the Beginnings of Vernacular Narrative Writing in Ireland. Maynooth Medieval Irish Texts 1. Maynooth: Department of Old and Middle Irish, National University of Ireland.
- McCone, Kim (2005). A First Old Irish Grammar and Reader: Including an Introduction to Middle Irish. Maynooth Medieval Irish Texts 3. Maynooth: Department of Old and Middle Irish, National University of Ireland.
- McCone, Kim (2006). The Origins and Development of the Insular Celtic Verbal Complex. Maynooth Studies in Celtic Linguistics 6. Maynooth: Department of Old Irish, National University of Ireland.
- McCone, Kim (2008). The Celtic Question: Modern Constructs and Ancient Realities. Dublin: Dublin Institute for Advanced Studies.
