= Hans Blüher =

German writer and philosopher (1888–1955)

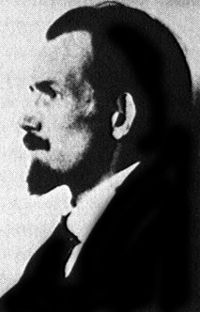
- Born: 17 February 1888; Freiburg in Schlesien, German Empire
- Died: 4 February 1955 (aged 66); Berlin, East Germany
- Resting place: Hermsdorf Cemetery, Berlin
- Known for: Participation in the Wandervogel movement

Hans Blüher (17 February 1888 – 4 February 1955) was a German writer and philosopher. He attained prominence as an early member and "first historian" of the Wandervogel movement. He was aided by his taboo breaking rebellion against schools and the Church. He was received with some genuine interest but sometimes perceived as scandalous.

During the transition from the German Empire to the Weimar liberal democracy, Blüher, a radical conservative and monarchist, became a staunch opponent of the Weimar Republic. In 1928, he had the opportunity to meet the former Kaiser Wilhelm II, in exile in the Netherlands. Blüher believed that pederasty and male bonding provided a basis for a stronger nation and state, which became a popular concept within certain segments of the Hitler Youth. Blüher later supported the Nazis but turned on them in 1934, when SA leader Ernst Röhm was murdered on Hitler's orders during the Night of the Long Knives.

Since 1924, Blüher, who had married a doctor and had two children, had worked as a freelance writer and practicing psychologist in Berlin-Hermsdorf. He worked there, after his retirement from public life during the Nazi period, on his major philosophical work of 1949, Die Achse der Natur.

== Student at Gymnasium Steglitz ==
In 1896 Blüher's father, the pharmacist Hermann Blüher, his wife Helene and their eight-year-old son Hans, left Freiburg and took up residence first in Halle and then, in 1898, in Steglitz where the ten-year-old Hans was sent to the local Gymnasium. In his 1912 account Blüher wrote:

"The intellectual pleasures are the purest and the most perfect. They persist throughout life undiminished and constantly trigger new feelings of happiness. One should expect that an institution such as a school, which deals only with intellectual subjects, and at the youngest age of life, would almost have to generate a rapture of discovery and understanding: - And it produces just the opposite! The student works not only with occasional overexertion and difficulty, which is naturally unavoidable in even the most liberal of intellectual endeavors, but with an immense feeling of displeasure. And this is expected at an age which, on account of its tenderness and need for joy, is least of all appropriate. On these young shoulders, in fact, lies a burden which the man only thinks back on in horror and yet it is perpetually alive in his dreams.

[...] The "science" learned in schools and the whole conception of culture which is represented there is indeed not free at all but entirely imposed. It is in service to all kinds of ideals and possible prejudices; patriotism and religion necessitate, in order to find solid ground in the student's heart, a quite considerable staining and falsification of reality. [...] Whence shall the intellectual joy come if the instrument is out of tune with the student who could well play upon it...?"

Later Blüher's criticism was, in part, much milder and more grateful. School director, Robert Lück, who Blüher had described as one of the somewhat narrow-minded Christian educators, underwent a revaluation in Blüher's second version of his autobiographical work "Werke und Tage." Blüher praised Lück's life work and described his selection of faculty as masterful: "How he actually managed it remains a mystery to everyone. He had an obvious charisma. The college nearly resembled an order."

In his autobiography, Blüher set his former school among the ranks of those gymnasiums to which he accorded a prominent role in German cultural life. Nowhere else in Germany was the soil for the dispute between humanistic education and the romantic counter-culture so fruitful; the Wandervogel and the youth movement could only have occurred here.

== Wandervogel Movement ==
Hans Blüher was admitted to the Wandervogel in 1902 as a 33rd degree member. His initiation was a ceremonial procedure wherein Karl Fischer deterred "foxes" for each of the newcomers. After instruction of the goals and premises of the Wandervogel movement, the aspirant swore loyalty to Fischer and to obey when necessary. He promised this in the presence of at least two other witnesses who attested to the oath then Fischer wrote his name into the members' book.

Hans Blüher understood this community as a protest movement against the "weathered ideals" of the "old generation" which one should vigorously resist with his own views and experiences. Blüher had a strictly dismissive attitude of the pedagogical tendencies and leisurely hiking of the group. For example, provisions that set early rest stops out of consideration for the younger participants were to him proof of "an insufficient understanding of the great experience of horror that the forest and the night also produced in the minds of the older members." There is a weak disregard for the young personality in "breaking the power of such precious hours." Blüher even thought little of recommendations to call off hikes due to persistent rain so as to not negatively affect the clothes and mood of the hikers: "That is exactly what is recommended for the faint of heart who from the very outset admit that they do not have the ability to drown out the inclement weather with the exuberance of their youthfulness. Those who know the old Wandervogel bacchanalia and are no degenerates, also know the unforgettable glory of such rainy weather marches."

Even in his 60s, Blüher spoke praisingly of those regions of Mark Brandenburg in which the Steglitzer Wandervogel found their weekend adventures in nature. This comparatively inconspicuous landscape wanted to be discovered "with the full fervor and suppleness of our hearts: this landscape had to be conquered, its divine word had come to us, otherwise us youth would have perished in the foul breath of the culture of our fathers. [...] The Nuthethal, upon which the first fire of our youth movement blazed, had imbued us with the historical force that had been in it for centuries and we partook of it. We came down from its hills and were a state."

These unusual formations of young people created a peculiar contrast to the rest of the citizenry of Steglitz when they returned home after an extensive hike:

“Now everything had come to life in Steglitz. The tidy boys of the well-nourished citizens walked along Albrecht Street in new suits, little girls following behind. The Fichteberg aristocracy and the half-nobility had the Church behind them and they paraded home with glazed, God-fearing eyes. When their sons wore their colorful school caps they always only took hold of the visor with two fingers, because the other three had to hold their dapper pair of gloves. They saluted and gave honors. - And among these wild, merry figures, there was this colorful hodgepodge of students! They walked with their bulky boots on the delicate plaster; one of them stayed behind because Wolf had thrown him down the sandy hillside of Havelberg and his pants were split. [...] "That crazy Fischer!" they simply said and moved on.

— Hans Blüher: Wandervogel. Geschichte einer Jugendbewegung. Erster Teil: Heimat und Aufgang. Dritte Auflage, Berlin-Tempelhof 1913, S. 54 f.

Hans Blüher, whose strikingly gaunt appearance earned him the nickname "Ghost," developed into one of Fischer's most loyal supporters but he also had Fischer's crucial support during his time with the Wandervogel movement.

During a summer trip to the Rhine in 1903, Blüher was sent home by expedition leader Siegfried Copalle for lacking identification, which did not meet with Fischer's approval. As a result, he defended him.

Another exceedingly lasting impression on Hans Blüher was made by the wealthy landowner Wilhelm "Willie" Jansen who met Blüher, himself an expedition leader now, on a 1905 summer trip from the Rhön to Lake Constance where Blüher won him for the Wandervogel movement.

"Jansen fascinated the youth by his personality, in no time he had opened the West German schools for the Wandervogel and the young men clung to him like burs. Of course, it was no different with Fischer: hero love. But this was in an undoubtedly intensified form [...] You can believe it or not, but I have read it in numerous letters and heard it from many young people themselves; it was true eroticism that erupted here.”

Like Karl Fischer before him, Wilhelm Jansen was the idealized youth leader who came to his authority through charisma and talent and not articles or power, as the teachers had alleged. Through the element of voluntarism, the model of the youth leader received an unexpected dynamism, which was generally described as anything from romantically wistful to fascinatingly mysterious. The self-education of the youth also made it possible to break away from the traditions of their parents' generation, which they considered outdated, and test out their own ways of growing up. For Blüher, at least, Jansen was the pioneering personality of the youth movement:

"Jansen was among the first to introduce ancient gymnastics as an alternative to the barbaric and often tasteless German gymnastics (Turnen), because this most natural form of physical culture had been erased by Christian culture and gymnastics (Turnen) was a highly imperfect replacement for it. The first German palaestra in Charlottenburg near Berlin had been built by Jansen, one of the first light and air baths was on his estate, and his capital worked everywhere it was necessary to overcome prudery and concealment and replace it with the noble openness of nudity. The physical culture movement, which continues to progress today, owes its first successes to Jansen."

— Hans Blüher: Wandervogel. Geschichte einer Jugendbewegung. Zweiter Teil: Blüte und Niedergang. Zweite Auflage, Berlin-Tempelhof 1912, S. 49 f.

The motif of the naked body, pristinely and truly perceived, is found not only in the youth movement, but also in other life reform groups and schools of thought. In all these cases, reference is made to the noble and truly idealized nudity of ancient cultures.

Historian of the Movement

Hans Blüher, who graduated from high school in 1907, spent seven years in the Wandervogel movement before leaving in 1909. But even then, he did not completely break off ties with the group, particularly as Blüher stood by his early friendships during the split-up of the organization and reclaimed sovereignty of interpretation over the development of the movement at the behest of the movement itself and supported by Willie Jansen, who urged him to pre-empt another party's account of the Wandervogel with a work of his own.

From the very title of the work itself, the 24-year-old Blüher claimed to comprehend and explain the rise, peak, and decline of the movement. It was important to him, he wrote in the foreword, to tie together the seemingly unconnected factors and determine the moving parts of this movement.

"In the process, he may make major mistakes, perhaps pivotal ones, while the chronicler will at worst make a spelling mistake. I will describe the history of the youth movement, whose innermost being, so far as I understand it, has such a wealth of interesting facts that it will be well worthwhile to ponder them; a movement that was entirely born of our youth is perhaps the most remarkable thing that has ever happened on German soil. But it is precisely its interior that is most remarkable, the unspoken, the secret... It was a youth who ate at clean tables on weekdays and had nothing to scrutinize, who then, at foggy festivals by brown heathens and sandy landscapes, dressed in wild clothes, backpacked and disheveled, unrecognizable, lying by the fire at night, and speaking to each other of things never said full of anger, frustration, recklessness, and melancholy."

— Hans Blüher: Wandervogel. Geschichte einer Jugendbewegung. Erster Teil: Heimat und Aufgang. Dritte Auflage, Berlin-Tempelhof 1913, S. VI, ff.

Blüher interpreted the institutional beginning of the Wandervogel movement as a "stroke of genius" on the part of Karl Fischer against school laws and the state authorities, who prohibited students from forming their own associations. By obtaining for a number of respected Steglitz citizens positions as board members on the "Board for School Transportation," he was able to establish the group on a permanent foundation and at the same time set the pattern for further initiatives: "This committee was the actual club. It was presented to the school and the names of the men ensured that everything went well. Quite apart from this was the actual youth movement with its leaders; it was ensured that the committee had as little as possible to do with it, only giving money and names and, as mentioned, 'vouched' for it to the public. The students themselves were entered into the "Student Book," but were not members of the association but rather only on a list where you could find their addresses."

At the inaugural session, Fischer appeared with some of his loyal followers, including the apprentice mechanic Wolf Meyen, who, being the youngest among them, came up with a brilliant idea for the name of their society, as Blüher relates:

"If it must simply have a name, said Wolf Meyen, why not call it "Wandervogel"! And that was that: the name was accepted without any further discussion! Tens of thousands of young people would be inspired by it and find the spirit of their youth in it."

— Hans Blüher: Wandervogel. Geschichte einer Jugendbewegung. Erster Teil: Heimat und Aufgang. Dritte Auflage, Berlin-Tempelhof 1913, S. 127

Meyen had seen the tomb of Kaethe Branco, née Helmholtz (1850-1877) in the Berlin-Dahlem Cemetery and read its inscription: "Who has given you the wandering birds of science..."

The association was founded in early November 1901; Fischer used the following winter months to recruit further suitable companions, who he could place in leadership roles for the next hiking season.

"When spring began, he contacted some schoolmasters, who made their auditoriums available to him and there he received the assembled youth and spoke to them about hiking and the glory of the gypsy life; but he chose his words carefully. And it was not long thereafter that a hundred Berlin students had come together from every suburb, attracted by the romantic magic that Fischer and his bacchants had spread."

— Hans Blüher: Wandervogel. Geschichte einer Jugendbewegung. Erster Teil: Heimat und Aufgang. Dritte Auflage, Berlin-Tempelhof 1913, S. 131

Initially, Blüher took a smug, dismissive attitude towards ideas that the Wandervogel was a form of "pedagogization." Thus, he polemicized against the "popular patriotic and bourgeois" ideals of their fathers, "such as those one gets to read in the newspaper and with which one applying for a government post can equip himself just so much as to be certain of a good career." This was extremely well suited for publicity:

"It was printed in all the pamphlets and newspapers of the Wandervogel, to its siren call government ministries and school authorities flocked alongside a whole host of protective powers and each took its toll on the youth movement, which grew ever weaker. Then young students screamed their throats sore at national gatherings and praised the high patriotic and moral value of the Wandervogel movement in exuberant tones. Woe to those who dared have a more naive understanding here: he who did so was an ordinary twerp who had no conception of the loftier ideals of mankind."

— Hans Blüher: Wandervogel. Geschichte einer Jugendbewegung. Erster Teil: Heimat und Aufgang. Dritte Auflage, Berlin-Tempelhof 1913, S. 95 f.

Eventually, there dawned "a time that bore the stamp of modernity" for Blüher in the history of the Wandervogel movement:

"The great temperance movement has to be mentioned above all, this pivotal plan of civilized humanity that has the audacity to break with every age-culture; furthermore, in contrast to the hypocritical segregation of the sexes as practiced by the parents, a closer approximation of the sexes in youth: hiking girls. With this came the cultivation of the folk song and much else... These portions of the movement stood spiritually higher and yielded a readable body of literature, whereas the pure Romanticists never got very far in this."

— Hans Blüher: Wandervogel. Geschichte einer Jugendbewegung. Erster Teil: Heimat und Aufgang. Dritte Auflage, Berlin-Tempelhof 1913, S. 96 f.

The inclusion of girls in the Wandervogel movement was strictly forbidden by Karl Fischer, who feared a blurring of gender images, presented as polar opposites: a feminization of the boys and a "tomboy-ization" of the girls. The spirit and nature of the boys were exclusively assigned classically masculine attributes such as toughness, a thirst for adventure, discipline, boldness, determination and physical strength. Through their relationship with male leaders, it was important to develop their own individual masculinity, and not only by their separation from women and girls, but also from their own biological fathers, who were seen as unsuitable role models. The Wandervogel movement thus confirmed the prevailing social gender roles and practices of the time which barred boys and girls from being together without adult supervision.

Critic of the Times and Taboo-Breaker: Pederasty

It was not uncommon for Blüher to strike an ironic or polemical tone in his history of the Wandervogel movement where he found that the movement had strayed from its origins or was spiked with the values of "the old generation." He was allergic, for example, to the appeals of older officers who assigned national services and duties. In contrast, it was important for him "to muster up enough laughs to constitute the only effective counterbalance to the patriotism of the war club." As a sign of inner maturity, he proposed "the self-evident respect for the love of other peoples for their fatherlands." In 1912, the personification and idolization of the fatherland through things such as statues of Germania seemed laughable to him and he considered embarrassing the pledge of "loyalty until death" affiliated "with the systematic slaughter of other peoples."

"There are two powers that constantly incite genocide: certain right-wing political parties, the so-called "rabble-rousers" and, walking hand in hand with them, the schoolmasters, especially the dangerous sort of history teachers (including religion teachers from time to time). These people are so backward that they don't even know that war between civilized nations today has proven to be an unprofitable business in which the victor cannot reap much more than his own economic ruin and perhaps an invasion of half-civilized peoples."

— Hans Blüher: Wandervogel. Geschichte einer Jugendbewegung. Zweiter Teil: Blüte und Niedergang. Zweite Auflage, Berlin-Tempelhof 1912, S. 185 f.

Blüher considered neither patriotic impulses nor a mere recreational purpose - moving away from "book dust" towards the revival of a willingness to learn - as decisive motives for the Wandervogel movement. Rather he saw in it an instinctive desire to turn away from the culture of their fathers in a Romantic return to nature: "A deep moral corruption, a nearly unspeakable insincerity in almost every serious relationship will prevail wherever young people are prepared by an idea rather than by their own selves and real-world situations."

Blüher's most consistent violation of the code of values and taboos of the fathers' generation was his affirmation of male homoeroticism and its influence on the Wandervogel movement. He had learned of the phenomenon itself during school lessons on classical antiquity. Ion of Chios was covered with a passage wherein Sophocles kisses a boy who is serving him at a banquet and falls in love with him: "The students had to translate this passage and thus got to know a side of ancient life that was deliberately concealed from them. They shook their heads and now knew much more than they had. They also likely found their way better in their own lives.”

In his memoirs, Blüher describes the Steglitz Gymnasium of his school days as a place where homoerotic relationships were quite common among the boys:

"But I am not aware of a single case where such a love of a boy had led to lustful attacks. For us, it was simply good form not to touch boys before they were mature... However, erotic relationships were decidedly more lively among peers; here we were seized by the fully inflamed Eros and it swept us away with it through all the gloom."

— Hans Blüher: Werke und Tage. München 1953, S. 219

According to Hergemöller, Blüher himself is said to have attracted attention in these years through a series of homoerotic escapades. A hapless apprentice locksmith who fell in love with him, as Blüher attests, committed suicide because of him. Ulfried Geuter, who evaluated Blüher's private estate for his study, confirms its heterosexual orientation and quotes from a letter from Blüher to his parents, "that it was only a question of will power and chance that tipped the scales in this direction," because he had "bad luck in the inverted direction" for years, which resulted in its waning. His beloved Louise, on the other hand, has had a hardly passionate but nevertheless uniform and powerful effect on him for three and a half years.

The topic of homosexuality assumed greater significance when Willie Jansen, who was serving as federal chairman of the Wandervogel movement in Berlin, denied the allegations against him of unlawful conduct in this regard, but attested to his colleagues naivety and ignorance regarding the homoerotic aspects in the life of the Wandervogel movement and added that they would probably be more cautious in this matter if the gentlemen were better aware of what interested themselves in the youth of the Wandervogel movement. "That was," comments Blüher, "an amazing speech, which was even more impactful since in fact none of the men, old or young, possessed any substantial knowledge of the erotic things." Geuter authenticates Blüher in this correlation by stating his work was "quintessentially a history of inclination, the second volume of which obviously served to pay homage to Jansen."

Blüher considered an observation made by Jansen during a personal conversation as fundamental to his own intellectual life: "Where does the vitality that is capable of giving rise to such a movement of masculine youth come from, if not from men who, instead of loving a wife or becoming the father of a family, loved young men and founded Männerbünde?" Through Jansen, Blüher also became acquainted with the German Jewish sexologist and sociologist Benedict Friedlaender and was introduced to the "Gemeinschaft der Eigenen" (Community of the Unique), an association of homosexual literati, scientists and artists, founded by him and Adolf Brand. Brand published the magazine Der Eigene (The Unique) from 1896 to 1932, in which he campaigned for the emancipation of homosexuals and for "art and masculine culture." Brunotte identifies Blüher in 1912 as a member of both the Community of the Unique and the Scientific-Humanitarian Committee of Magnus Hirschfeld and sees Blüher's early work as an intersection serving as the bridge between the various concepts of homosexuality and masculinity on the one hand and Freudian psychoanalysis on the other.

To the first two volumes of his account of the Wandervogel movement, which discussed its "Rise," "Peak," and "Decline," Blüher added a third under the title "The German Wandervogel Movement as Erotic Phenomenon." He had already anticipated resistance to the distribution of his writings prior to their publication - school director Lück personally saw to it that Blüher's volumes were removed from display in Steglitz bookstores, which did not noticeably harm demand, and had the publication of all three volumes secured by contract. It was crucial for him "to suddenly ambush public opinion, to suddenly be there completely unexpectedly, and to be there in such a way that you could no longer be driven out from this position."

As the printing of the leaflets approached its end, I did the following: I cut out the most harmless parts with scissors, landscape descriptions, travel experiences, drawings of characters, all of which were written in a skillful, Fontanesque style, and sent them to some of the most important Wandervogel magazines, along with a cover letter stating that my history of the Wandervogel would soon be published by Bernhard Weise and I would like them to print the enclosed excerpt. Hardly had the letters been sent when there was a flurry of urgent inquiries: What is this all about...? They hadn't heard the slightest thing about it, so they requested immediate clarification. Above all, they requested that the entire work be sent in proof copies, if possible, so that they could get an overview. However, that was precisely what I had to prevent at all costs.

Blüher wrote to those interested, stating that he had cut up all the sample copies and sent them all to editorial offices, therefore he couldn't provide the entire work for viewing. However, anyone who ordered a larger quantity would receive exclusive distribution rights within a reasonable waiting period. In this way, he managed to sell 1500 copies of the first volume in one go. For the release of the second and third volumes six months later, he entered into pre-contracts with numerous newspapers for advertising and distribution, which were then to be fulfilled independently of the daring content of the work:

== Engagement With Psychoanalysis ==
During the final phase of his work on the history of the Wandervogel movement, as recounted in his memoirs, Blüher reports that Heinrich Koerber, a psychotherapist who held discussion circles on Sigmund Freud's teachings in Lichterfelde-Ost, revealed to him the solution to a theoretical problem concerning his homoerotic interpretation of the Wandervogel movement. Until then, it remained unclear to him "that at least an equal number of youth leaders who dedicated their entire time to the Wandervogel movement, instead of pursuing relationships with women, did not engage in any actions that could be interpreted as erotic at all. In fact, they passionately opposed such actions and vehemently pursued those who engaged in them." Koerber directed him to read Freud, who was already known in professional circles at the time. When Blüher came across the discussions on the Oedipus complex, everything suddenly became clear to him:

"I learned about the fundamental concept of repression. In the field of empirical psychology, this concept has the same effect as the concept of gravitation in mechanics. Without knowledge of such fundamental concepts, which can only be discovered by geniuses, it is impossible to pursue the corresponding science, unless one is satisfied with mere perceptual judgments. The concept of repression assumes the law of the indestructibility of psychic energy and confirms it in exactly the same way that the discovery of the mechanical equivalent of heat confirms the preservation of non-psychic energy. [...] Freud's concept of repression states that if a sexual drive becomes unbearable to consciousness, it is pushed into the unconscious through an unconscious psychological mechanism - namely, repression. However, it does not undergo destruction there, which is impossible due to the a priori principle of energy conservation. Instead, it returns with a 'negative sign,' manifesting as fear, disgust, shame, and so on, when it is brought back to consciousness by a stimulating motive. After grasping this thought, which impressed me with its magnificence and simplicity, the entire dynamic between the 'heroes of men' and their pursuers became clear to me in an instant. They were both cut from the same cloth; both were completely infatuated with the young male human being [...] However, the hero of men embraced his own nature, acknowledged it, and lived according to it, whereas the pursuer repressed this infatuation along with its most intense expressions. This repression led to a transformation into fear. [...] The pursuer, therefore, fights - albeit in vain - against the realization that he could be a lover of boys, and to be completely certain, he shifts his internal battlefield outward; he pursues the self-affirming heroes of men. With this theory of the 'externalized battlefield,' the mystery was solved, and the game was won. My theory had transcended the realm of perceptual judgments and become an experiential judgment, a genuine science, thus making publication permissible."

In his scandalous book The German Wandervogel As Erotic Phenomenon, Blüher emphasized his and his companions' disinterest in the opposite sex during that time:

"Even the first old Wandervogel, who came together in that Berlin suburb, were known as 'misogynists.' This means that they were never seen on the main street in the evening, engaged in amorous conflicts with girls. The Wandervogel did not engage in flirtation. They also did not attend dance classes; but if one did so under pressure from relatives, they could be certain of the most exquisite ridicule. A Wandervogel seen with a girl would have been considered a decline in style, which would have spoiled the entire vagabond spirit in one fell swoop. It was as if the female sex did not exist for this youth; it was not even mentioned.

In order to facilitate the public reception of his interpretations of the Wandervogel movement, Blüher had not only relied on contractual arrangements but also sought professional support for his views as an unknown young author. "For this purpose, I appropriately approached two particularly distinguished authorities in the field of sexual science: Dr. Magnus Hirschfeld, the foremost expert on the subject matter, in Berlin, and Prof. Dr. Sigmund Freud, the greatest sexual theorist, in Vienna." His approach was "recognized and deemed good" by both of them, as well as by others who were asked to evaluate it. Hirschfeld even agreed to provide a foreword for Blüher's third Wandervogel volume. This made him an important authority for Blüher's demand for sexual freedom, including homosexuality.

"In one of his essays, Magnus Hirschfeld once made a very astute remark that homosexuals, by often having simple affections, become the most useful promoters of the reconciliation of class differences through their love. [...] This would be the positive aspect, the contribution to the life of the people. The negative aspect is equally important: the compensatory loss. According to Freud's research, neurotics always show a more or less strong inverted component through psychoanalytic means, which, when repression fails, contributes to the production of illness. Therefore, the liberation of the inverted love complex becomes a psycho-sanitary demand in the interest of the people."

The association with Hirschfeld failed, however, because Blüher did not want to take sides in the conflict between Freud and Wilhelm Stekel and his anti-Semitism became apparent. Blüher's commitment to Sigmund Freud's teachings was fundamental and far-reaching for him. He saw them as "the indisputable pinnacle of psychiatry [...] and we should get used to valuing the applause of pre-Freudian scholars who agree with us less than the opposition of orthodox Freudians. Because thinking in a pre-Freudian way in psychology today is about as silly as metaphysizing in pre-Kantian epistemology." However, unlike Freud, Blüher did not see homosexual inclination as being caused by psychological processes but rather as innate, thus distinguishing himself from Freud:

"The gender I am compelled to love has been decided in a realm that lies beyond the psychological. [...] However, how I behave towards the loved gender throughout my life is subject to psychological laws that can be demonstrated. It was a mistake in Freud's thinking that he wanted to perceive the male-male eros as a result of psychological processes, ultimately as a deviation from the male-female norm. Despite the extensive correspondence I had with him at that time, he refused to acknowledge its autonomous origin. So, our paths diverged here."

The difference with Freud was that Blüher did not see any neurotic maldevelopment in his "Heroes of Men" due to the Oedipal problem. Blüher considered only latent and female homosexuality as pathological, but not sexual inversion in men. According to Geuter, he made a valid point with his criticism of psychoanalysis, which could not explain the "healthy complete invert."

However, just as Blüher later had a personal falling out with Freud due to anti-Semitic remarks, his relationship with his other supporter, Magnus Hirschfeld, also changed. Blüher accused Hirschfeld of arbitrarily cutting his contribution from the Yearbook for Intermediate Sexual Types and referred to him as a representative of a "Jewish-liberal cultural outlook." He also defamed Hirschfeld by portraying him as existing in a milieu of "deformed men" whose racial degeneration was characterized by an excessive abundance of feminine substance. In his memoirs, Blüher also falsely claimed that the aforementioned yearbook included illustrations to make it more appealing. Although he never underwent analytical training, Blüher practiced as a psychotherapist.

== See also ==
- Heinrich Schurtz
- Adolf Brand
- Homosociality
