= Ver sacrum =

Ancient Italian dedication practice for colonies

Ver sacrum ("sacred spring") is a religious practice of ancient Italic peoples, especially the Sabelli (or Sabini) and their offshoot Samnites, concerning expulsion of an age-cohort and the foundation and dedication of colonies.

The practice was of special interest to Georges Dumézil, according to whom the ver sacrum perpetuated prehistoric migration practices of Indo-Europeans to the end of the Iron Age and into the beginnings of history, when stable sedentary dwelling conditions had already become general.

Jan Bremmer places the ver sacrum in a traditional economic light: "a possibility of the initiatory structure which could be actualized whenever society did not offer sufficient possibilities to its youths".

== Religious meaning ==
The practice of vēr sacrum consisted of a vow (Latin: vōtum) dedicating to the god Mars all offspring (livestock and/or human) born in the following spring (Latin: vēr, lit. 'spring season'). Among the Sabines, this was the period from March 1 to April 30.

The practice is related to that of devotio in Roman religion. People customarily resorted to it at times of particular danger or strife for the community. Some scholars believe that in earlier times devoted or "vowed" children were actually sacrificed, but later, expulsion was substituted. Dionysius of Halicarnassus states the practice of child sacrifice was one of the causes that brought about the fall of the Pelasgians in Italy.

The human children who had been devoted were required to leave the community in early adulthood, at 20 or 21 years of age. They were entrusted to a god for protection, and led to the border, faces veiled. Often they were led by an animal under the auspices of the god. As a group, the youths were called sacrani and were supposed to enjoy the protection of Mars until they had reached their destination, expelled the inhabitants there (or forced them into submission), and founded their own settlement.

The tradition is recorded by Festus, Livy, Strabo, Sisenna, Servius, Varro, and Dionysius of Halicarnassus.

== Animals and naming ==
Guide animals that led the group sometimes became the eponyms of the new community. These included the wolf (hirpus), after which the Hirpini of Campania were supposed to have been named; the woodpecker (picus), which gave its name to the Picentes who settled present-day Marche (hence the green woodpecker as the symbol of the region); the vulture (vultur) of the Vultures; and the horse (equus) of the Aequi or Aequicolae in Latium. The Samnites were led by an ox (bos), after which was named their capital Bovianum, founded upon the hill on which the ox had stopped. The Mamertini of Sicily received their name directly from the god Mars.

== Animals in signa militaria ==
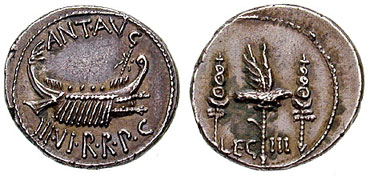
Denarius of Marcus Antonius (32 BC) depicting a legionary eagle (aquila) on the reverse

Guide animals from the ver sacrum and their legends may explain the use of animal insignia by the Roman army. Gaius Marius was the first to adopt the eagle in all the signa militaria; previously the eagle had been the first and highest of the signa. Others in use were the wolf, the Minotaur, the horse and the boar. Andreas Alföldi has linked each animal with a Roman god, starting with the eagle and Jupiter and ending with the boar of Quirinus: thus the wolf would be related to Mars, the Minotaur to Liber and the horse to Neptune.

Dumézil emphasizes the affinity of Indo-Iranian human and warrior gods with animal forms: among the Iranian god of victory V(e)r(e)thragna's incarnations, seven are of animal form, including the bull, horse, boar and hawk, each of which is associated at one time or another with a ver sacrum and Roman army insignia.

On the recto of coins from Campania appears a human character bearing over his head that of a boar, and on the verso the word ROMA. German scholar C. Koch interprets this character as god Quirinus, since he identifies the boar, aper, as the animal symbol of the god. Dumézil remarks that the boar is the animal symbolizing Freyr, a Vane (god) in Scandinavian mythology, who rides one.

== The Roman ver sacrum ==
Dumézil argues that of the two major traditions of the founding of Rome, one seems to make reference to a ver sacrum and the other makes an explicit identification. This last one says that sacrani who had come from the town of Reate, today Rieti, expelled the indigenous Ligures and Sicels from the place that would later become the Septimontium. In the version accepted as canonic by Livy and Dionysius of Halicarnassus Rome was founded by two twins, sons of Mars, who were nurtured by a she-wolf and who had left the town of Alba of their own accord. Dumézil's interpretation is not universally shared by scholars: in the Cambridge Ancient History, Arnaldo Momigliano states flatly that "Romulus did not lead a ver sacrum."

The last ver sacrum recorded in history occurred at Rome during the Second Punic War after the defeats at Trasimene and Cannae and concerned only cattle. Livy's narrative of the event provides information on two important points of pontifical jurisprudence. Firstly, the pontifex maximus Lucius Cornelius Lentulus Caudinus made it clear the votum would be valid only after a vote of the Roman people (iussu populi); then he specified a long series of unfavourable events and circumstances which were as a rule regarded as invalidating but would not be so as far as the present votum was concerned in the case they happen. Dumézil (1977) notes the overall authenticity of the formula preserved in Livy's passage. Bouché-Leclercq (1871) notes that Lentulus showed unusual theological and juridical prudence in ensuring that the sacrum's validity would be unaffected by the fraud or ignorance of private citizens.

== See also ==
- Kóryos
- Ostracism
- Relegatio
