= Kathleen Mary Tyrer Atkinson =

Historian and archaeologist

Kathleen Mary Tyrer Atkinson FSA
- Professor Katherine Mary Tyrer Atkinson.
- Born: Katherine Mary Tyrer Chrimes
- Died: May 1979
- Spouse: Donald Atkinson

Academic background
- Education: St Hilda's College, Oxford

Academic work
- Discipline: Ancient Historian
- Sub-discipline: Greek history
- Institutions: Victoria University of Manchester University College Leicester Queen's University Belfast

Kathleen Mary Tyrer Atkinson, née Chrimes (d. May 1979) was an ancient historian and archaeologist working in Britain, Greece, and Cyprus; she was the first woman professor at Queen's University Belfast, and a Fellow of the Society of Antiquaries.

== Career ==
Kathleen Mary Tyrer Atkinson (née Chrimes) studied Classics at St Hilda's College, Oxford University, graduating with first-class honours. After her studies she travelled in Italy, spending time at the British School at Rome, and took part in excavations in Sparta, leading to her book 'Ancient Sparta: A Re-examination of the Evidence'; she also worked on excavations at Kouklia (Cyprus) and Caistor-by-Norwich. From the early 1930s, she was an Assistant Lecturer in Ancient Greek History at Manchester University, working with the archaeologist Donald Atkinson, whom she married in August 1932 in Eckington. As the University did not allow women to hold regular academic posts in the same department as their husbands, she was given an annually renewable 'special lecturer' position; in the late 1940s, she therefore moved to University College Leicester. In 1949 she moved to Queen's University as a Reader in Ancient History, where she remained for the rest of her career with the exception of a year in the US in 1954, which she spent doing research at Ann Arbor and the University of Illinois. She was elected a Fellow of the Society of Antiquaries in January 1954, and later was made Professor of Ancient History, delivering an inaugural lecture entitled "Reflections on the Roman Rule of Law" on 27 January 1965; this made her the first woman professor at Queen's University. Atkinson published on a wide variety of topics in ancient Greek and Roman history, law, and literature. She died in 1979, leaving a bequest to the Roman Society to found the Donald Atkinson Fund.

== Selected publications ==
- Athenian Legislative Procedure and Revision of Laws, Bulletin of the John Rylands Library (1939)
- The Respublica Lacedaimoniorum Ascribed to Xenophon (Manchester University Press, 1948)
- Ancient Sparta: A Re-Examination of the Evidence (Manchester University Press, 1949)
- "Restitution in Integrum" and "Iussum Augusti Caesaris" in an Inscription at Leyden (1960)
- The Historical Setting of the Habbakuk Commentary, Journal of Semitic Studies 4 (1959)
