= Donald Atkinson (archaeologist) =

English historian (1886–1963)

Donald Atkinson FSA
- Born: 13 September 1886; Birmingham, Warwickshire
- Died: 4 February 1963 (aged 76)
- Spouse: Kathleen Mary Tyrer Atkinson

Academic background
- Education: King Edward's school, Birmingham
- Alma mater: Brasenose College, Oxford

Academic work
- Discipline: Ancient history and archaeology
- Sub-discipline: Roman pottery
- Institutions: University College Reading Victoria University of Manchester

Donald Atkinson (13 September 1886 – 4 February 1963) was an English ancient historian, archaeologist, and academic who was professor of Ancient History at the Victoria University of Manchester.

== Early life and education ==
Atkinson was born on 13 September 1886 in Birmingham, son of William Henry and Amelia Toy Atkinson. He attended the public King Edward's School, and later studied classics at Brasenose College, Oxford, from which he graduated in 1909. At Brasenose he came under the influence of Francis J. Haverfield.

== Career ==
After graduation, Atkinson became a schoolteacher, teaching classics at Stamford Grammar School from 1909 to 1912. While teaching at Stamford, he supervised archaeological excavations of the North Leigh Roman Villa in Oxfordshire for Haverfield. Atkinson also worked on excavations of Coria in Corbridge.

In 1912, Atkinson received a Pelham Studentship at the British School at Rome. While there, he published A Hoard of Samian Ware from Pompeii. In 1913, Atkinson was appointed lecturer at University College, Reading. He continued to work on excavations, assisting J. P. Bushe-Fox at Wroxeter between 1912 and 1914, and supervising an excavation at Adel in West Yorkshire in 1913.

In 1922, Atkinson became Reader in Ancient History at the Victoria University of Manchester, where he was appointed Chair of Ancient History seven years later in 1929. While at Manchester, he worked on excavations at several archaeological sites including Wroxeter, Ribchester and Caistor-by-Norwich. Atkinson also published on the Roman naval fleet Classis Britannica, on the Roman governors of Britain, and on the early history of Christianity.

In the 1930s, Atkinson became honorary curator of Rowley's House Museum in Shrewsbury and supervised the display of Roman finds from Wroxeter.

After his retirement in 1951 he became the Honorary Curator of the Corinium Museum in Cirencester, where he organized the collections of the museum and catalogued the Roman coins. He also became a founding member of the Cirencester and District Archaeological and Historical Society and in 1959 a member of the Cirencester Excavation Committee.

He was a founder member of the Society for the Promotion of Roman Studies in 1910 and served on its council. He represented Manchester University on the Chester Excavation Committee in the 1930s.

== Awards and honours ==
He was elected as a fellow of the Society of Antiquaries in 1929. He was awarded an MA from Manchester in 1929, as only Manchester graduates could become members of the university's Senate. He became emeritus Professor at Manchester after his retirement in 1951.

== Legacy ==
Atkinson's main legacy was the publication of the Terra sigillata from Pompeii and the report on the terra sigillata and mortaria found dumped and sealed outside the forum in Wroxeter after a fire.

The report on the Wroxeter excavations, done between 1923 and 1927, was not published until 1942 and attracted some criticism for the long delay and low standards of excavation.

Only a part of Atkinson's excavations at Caistor-by-Norwich were published and the report on the forum and baths was published by others in 1971 after his death. There were comments on the poor quality of the site records.

== Personal life ==
Atkinson married Kathleen Mary Tyrer Chrimes in 1932. She was an assistant lecturer at Manchester specialising in ancient Greek history, and because University regulations forbade wives from holding permanent posts in their husband's departments, she became a special lecturer on an annual contract. She later moved to University College Leicester and then became Professor of Ancient History at Queen's University Belfast. A bequest from her formed the Donald Atkinson Fund of the Roman Society.

During the First World War Atkinson served with the Royal Garrison Artillery between 1916 and 1918. He retired to Oxfordshire in 1951.

== Published works ==
- Atkinson, Donald (1913) An Excavation at Adel. Yorkshire Archaeological Journal 22: 287–93.
- Atkinson, Donald (1914) A Hoard of Samian Ware from Pompeii. Journal of Roman Studies 4: 27–64.
- Atkinson, Donald (1916) The Romano British site on Lowbury Hill in Berkshire. University College Reading Studies in History & Archaeology.
- Atkinson, Donald (1922a) Samian ware. The Vasculum 8: 136–42.
- Atkinson, Donald (1922b) The governors of Britain from Claudius to Diocletian. The Journal of Roman Studies 12: 60–73.
- Atkinson, Donald (1923) Samian ware. The Vasculum 9: 29.
- Atkinson, Donald (1924a) An imperial estate in Germania Superior. Classical Review 38: 55–58.
- Atkinson, Donald (1924b) Civitas Cornoviorum. Classical Review 38: 146–48.
- Atkinson, D., and Taylor, M. V. (Eds.) (1924) Flint Excavation Report, being an account of some trial trenches dug at Pentre, 1923. Flintshire History Society Publications 10(1): 122.
- Atkinson, Donald (1925) Appendix II: Campaigns, Revolts and unrest in Gaul after the withdrawal of Caesar/Invasion of the Cimbri and Teutones. In J.P. BusheFox, Excavation of the Late Celtic Urnfield at Swarling, Kent, Rep Res Comm Soc Antiq London. London: Society of Antiquaries of London.
- Atkinson, Donald (1928) A new Roman governor of Provincia Britannia. Classical Review 42: 11–14.
- Atkinson, Donald (1929) The Roman villa at Gayton Thorpe. Norfolk Archaeology 23: 166–209.
- Atkinson, Donald (1931) Caistor Excavations, 1929. Norfolk Archaeology 24: 93–139.
- Atkinson, Donald (1932) Three Caistor Pottery Kilns. Journal of Roman Studies 22: 33–36.
- Atkinson, Donald (1933) Classis Britannica. In Historical Essays in Honour of James Tait. Manchester.
- Atkinson, Donald (1938a) Roman Pottery from Caistor-next-Norwich. Norfolk Archaeology 26: 197–230.
- Atkinson, Donald (1938b) The Sator formula and the beginnings of Christianity. Bulletin of the John Rylands Library 22: 419–34.
- Atkinson, Donald (1942) Report on Excavations at Wroxeter (the Roman City of Viroconium) in the County of Salop 1923–1927,. Oxford: OUP.
- Atkinson, Donald (1951) The Origin and date of the "Sator" Word Square. Journal of Ecclesiastical History 2: 1–18.
- Atkinson, Donald (1957a) A Fragment of a Diploma from Cirencester. Journal of Roman Studies 47: 196–197.
- Atkinson, Donald (1957b) The Verulamium forum inscription. Antiquaries Journal 37: 216–17.
- Atkinson, Donald (1958) The Cirencester Word Square. Transactions of the Bristol and Gloucestershire Archaeological Society 76: 21–34.
- Atkinson, Donald (1960) Decorated Samian in 'Cirencester: Dyer Court Excavation 1957'. Transactions of the Bristol and Gloucestershire Archaeological Society 78: 44–85.
- Atkinson, Donald (1962) The Coins in 'Excavations in Parsonage Field, Watermoor Road, Cirencester, 1959',. Antiquaries Journal 42: 160–82.
- Atkinson, Donald (1962) Samian ware', in E.M. Clifford, "The Hucclecote Roman Villa". Transactions of the Bristol and Gloucestershire Archaeological Society 80: 42–49.
- Atkinson, Donald (1972) Coins' and 'The Samian Ware in 'Excavations in the Parsonage Field, Cirencester 1958'. 90: 64–94.
- Collingwood, R. G. (1928) The Roman Fort at Ribchester. Edited by the RevJ. H. Hopkinson. Third edition, revised and enlarged by Donald Atkinson. Pp. 35, with 10 plans and illustrations. Manchester: University Press, 1928. 1s. net. The Classical Review 42(6): 244–244.
- Haverfield, F., and Atkinson, D. (Eds.) (1917) The First Days of Carlisle. Transactions of the Cumberland and Westmorland Antiquarian and Archaeological Society, 17: 235–50.
- Hopkinson, M., and Atkinson, Donald (1928) The Roman Fort at Ribchester. (3rd ed.). Manchester.
- Real, J (Ed) (1969) Cirencester Coin Collections Transactions of the Bristol and Gloucestershire Archaeological Society 87: 65–70.
- Shaw, R. C., and Atkinson, Donald (1926) The pottery in 'Excavations at Willowford'. Transactions of the Cumberland and Westmorland Antiquarian and Archaeological Society 26: 429–506.
