= Henri Jeanmaire =

French historian of religion and classical philologist (1884–1960)

Henri Jeanmaire (21 November 1884 – 22 February 1960) was a French historian and classicist.

== Biography ==
Henri Jeanmaire was born in Paris on 21 November 1884. His father was a first-class medical officer. A member of the 1905 literary cohort of the École normale supérieure, Jeanmaire earned a baccalauréat ès lettres in 1902, a licence ès lettres in 1906 and passed the agrégation in history in 1909.

He began his career as an agrégé teacher at the lycée of Oran (1 October 1909–24 April 1911), then spent a period on leave in Germany from April 1911 to September 1912, with the leave renewed from October 1912 to September 1913. He subsequently taught at the lycée of Besançon (1 October 1913–30 September 1920) and served as chargé d’enseignement in ancient and medieval history at the Faculty of Letters of Besançon (February 1917–September 1919).

He began teaching the history of religions at the University of Lille in 1924, holding this position until 1943. Alongside his duties in Lille, Jeanmaire also served as chargé de conférence at the École pratique des hautes études (EPHE) from 1929 to 1936. In 1930 he published Le messianisme de Virgile, a study of the Fourth Eclogue.

Jeanmaire defended his doctorat ès lettres at the Sorbonne in March 1939. His principal thesis, Couroi et Courètes, was accompanied by a secondary dissertation entitled La Sibylle et le retour de l'âge d'or. He left the University of Lille following his appointment, by ministerial decree on 7 July 1943, as Director of Studies for the religions of ancient Greece at the EPHE. He retired in September 1955.

Jeanmaire died in Viroflay on 22 February 1960, taking his own life by hanging.

== Studies ==
Jeanmaire authored two major works that achieved authoritative status: Couroi et Courètes (1939), and his later synthesis, Dionysos: histoire du culte de Bacchus (1951). The latter, a work of scholarly popularization, enjoyed significant and lasting success. Couroi et Courètes, a large and methodologically original study, examined Greek age-classes and interpreted numerous festivals and initiatory ceremonies as rites of entry. Jeanmaire applied this framework to Athenian festivals, the Delphic nine-year cycle, Cretan initiations, and the age-class system of classical Sparta. At a time when initiation rites were still an essentially unexplored field in classical studies, Jeanmaire approached them using concepts drawn from anthropology. As Romain Roy notes, Hellenists who later embraced the study of initiation rites—especially following the influential work of Pierre Vidal-Naquet—recognised their debt to Jeanmaire's works.

In 1939, the Association des études grecques awarded its annual prize jointly to Jeanmaire's Couroi et Courètes and to Claire Préaux's L'économie royale des Lagides. On 12 April 1940, the Académie des Inscriptions et Belles-Lettres announced that its Ambatiélos Prize had also been awarded to Jeanmaire for Couroi et Courètes. In 1958, the Académie awarded him the Lefèvre-Deumier Prize for his collected work.

In the historiography of Greek religion and society, Jeanmaire's Couroi et Courètes has been viewed as a foundational link between Jane Ellen Harrison's Themis (1912) and Vidal-Naquet's The Black Hunter (1981). In a 1980 interview with Le Monde, Pierre Vidal-Naquet explicitly situated his own work, and that of scholars following the line of Louis Gernet, as continuing the trajectory opened by Harrison and Jeanmaire.

== Works ==
- Le messianisme de Virgile, Paris, J. Vrin, 1930.
- Couroi et courètes : essai sur l'éducation spartiate et sur les rites d'adolescence dans l'Antiquité hellénique, Lille, Bibliothèque universitaire, 1939.
- Dionysos : histoire du culte de Bacchus, Paris, Payot, 1951.
