= Heinrich Schurtz =

German ethnologist and historian (1863–1903)

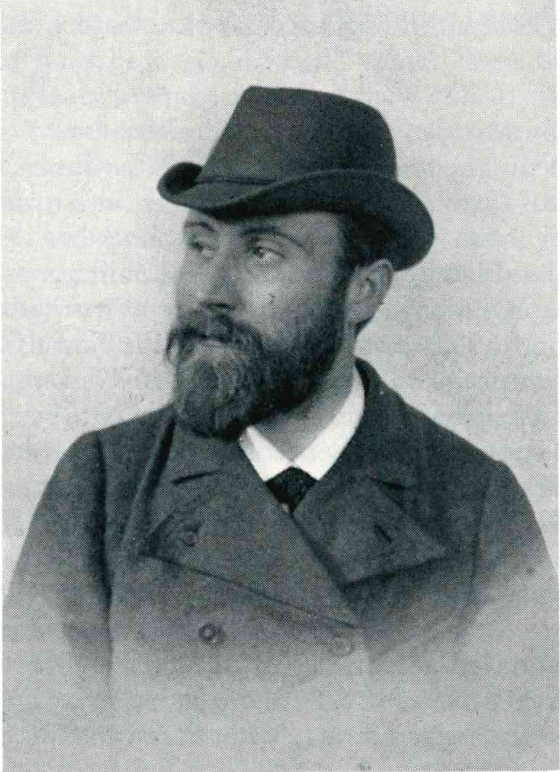
- Born: 11 December 1863; Zwickau, Province of Saxony
- Died: 2 May 1903 (aged 39); Bremen, German Empire

Education
- Education: Leipzig University (PhD)
- Doctoral advisor: Friedrich Ratzel

Philosophical work
- Institutions: Leipzig University; Overseas Museum, Bremen
- Notable students: Leo Frobenius
- Main interests: Philosophy, anthropology
- Notable ideas: Inside-money, outside-money, Männerbünde

Heinrich Schurtz (born 11 December 1863 in Zwickau; died 2 May 1903 in Bremen) was a German ethnologist and cultural historian. A prolific writer and museum curator, his 1902 work Altersklassen und Männerbünde is still cited today for its groundbreaking emphasis on the central role of associations in the social organization of non-European peoples. He is also known for his pioneering analyses of money, exchange, and the cultural foundations of economic life. His 1898 treatise, Grundriss einer Entstehungsgeschichte des Geldes (An Outline of the Origins of Money) was a foundational text for economic historians, anthropologists, and philosophers exploring the origins and functions of money, influencing figures such as Georg Simmel, Max Weber, Marcel Mauss, and Karl Polanyi.

== Life and education ==
Heinrich Camillo Schurtz was born in December 1863 in Zwickau, in the Kingdom of Saxony, to a family with spiritist inclinations. Schurtz began his studies in chemistry and mineralogy at the University of Leipzig in 1885 after being discharged from the local infantry regiment for medical reasons. Schurtz’s doctoral thesis, supervised by Friedrich Ratzel, examined the distribution and cultural significance of the African throwing knife, a weapon he described as primarily ornamental.

In 1891, Schurtz completed his habilitation, Grundzüge einer Philosophie der Tracht ("Elements of a Philosophy of Traditional Clothing"), developing a theory of the origin of shame and describing the connections between clothing, ornamentation, status, and gender. He shows how clothing are related to stages of individual life cycles as well as world religions and offers an overview of the international trade in textiles with a focus on Africa.

In 1893, became an ethnographic research assistant at the Museum for Natural Science, Anthropology and Commerce in Bremen.

While at Leipzig, Schurtz also formed a close bond with Wilhelm Wundt, a leading figure in experimental and ethnographic psychology. Wundt later mourned Schurtz as “the best ethnologist we had.”

Heinrich Schurtz died at 39 from appendicitis following a brief illness.

== Writings ==
=== An Outline of the Origins of Money ===
Schurtz’s 1898 book, An Outline of the Origins of Money explored how “hoarding drives”, gift-giving practices, and material aesthetics influenced monetary formation and economic activity. Schurtz challenged both evolutionist and utilitarian accounts of social development, ultimately highlighting the double nature of money and its profound role in shaping inequality, rank, and collective life.

He identified several confusion in prevailing ideas: the belief that money arose solely from barter or as a product of the state, and the imposition of modern economic concepts onto other societies. Schurtz proposed that money was not a unified concept but an “illusory unity” with two separate origins: “inside-money,” which emerged within communities to fulfill social tasks through symbols or sign-money, and “outside-money,” which developed through trade and commerce between societies.

=== African Trade ===
Published in 1900, Das Afrikanische Gewerbe represented a major ethnological-historical study that applied the methodologies of the German historical school of economics to the African continent. The work provided a comprehensive examination of the development of social classes, craft specialization, and guild-like institutions. Schurtz also included detailed analyses of labor relations, including slavery, as well as the functioning of markets, urban centers, and complex monetary systems.

=== Age Sets and Male Associations: A Description of the Fundamental Forms of Society ===
In this 1902 monograph, Schurtz introduced the concept of the Männerbund (male association). Schurtz organises the 458-page monograph in four parts. Part I (pp. 1–90) sets out the fundamental opposition between kin-based “Geschlechtsverbände” (family or lineage groups) and elective “Geselligkeitsverbände” (associations formed by age, sex, occupation, belief, etc.). Cultural progress, he argues, arose "outside" and "against" the family through autonomous male sodalities motivated by a “drive for sociability.” Part II (pp. 91–201) marshals comparative data on age-class systems—from African warrior corps to Australian initiation grades—while Part III (pp. 202–307) analyses the "men’s house" as the political, religious and educational centre of male life. Part IV (pp. 308–458) traces the historical transformation of these institutions into secret societies, brotherhoods and modern clubs. Throughout, Schurtz emphasises ritual gender separation and successive initiation grades as engines of social differentiation.

In response to the Swiss historian Johann Jakob Bachofen’s theory of a matriarchal origin of humanity, Schurtz introduced the concept of the Männerbund into ethnological discourse, setting it against Bachofen’s notion of a gender-based dichotomy. Émile Durkheim welcomed the book as an attempt “to determine the elementary forms of social organisation,” praising the detailed treatment of men’s houses. Robert Lowie, who led Berkeley’s anthropology department, noted that the book contains “one of Schurtz’s most signal services,” namely the explanation of “the early origin of political society” “without any deliberate legal enactment.” While he hardly addressed European circumstances in the book, he identified men’s “pure drive to associate,” in contrast to the “unmoving, family-centered woman,” as the origin of such men’s associations among so-called “primitive peoples,” seeing them as the primary agents of nearly all higher forms of social evolution. Notions of Männerbünde, though not just Schurtz's, would have an influence on Nazi Germany's SS while in a very different way his ideas on same-sex bonding has become of historical interest to Queer studies.

=== Schurtz and Anthropology ===
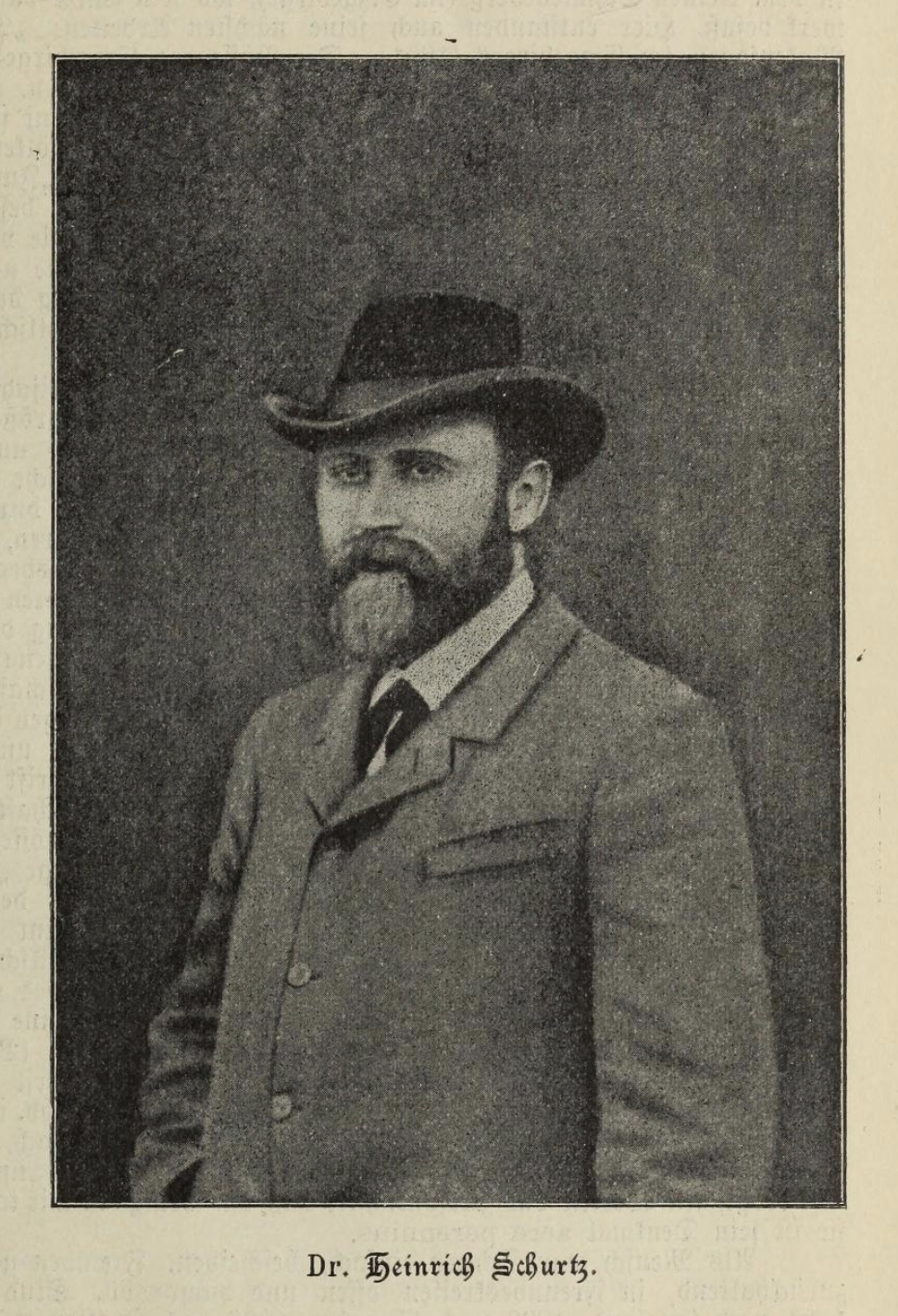
Heinrich Schurtz, in a posthumous portrait from his necrology.

Schurtz helped lay the foundation for academic anthropology as a formal discipline in Germany by publishing two anthropology textbooks (Katechismus der Völkerkunde, and Völkerkunde) as well as his most significant work Urgeschichte der Kultur ("The History of Culture") which impressed with its broad scope and detailed research, receiving over one hundred reviews in various national and international journals. In the first volume of the anthropological journal Man, Northcote W. Thomas reviewed Schurtz’s Urgeschichte, noting that Schurtz “has written a work which is worthy of his reputation” and that “no man can cover this ground single-handed. Dr. Schurtz has been amazingly industrious.” Thomas recommended it “unreservedly.” The book covered a wide range of topics, including the development of technology, social structures, religion, and art across different cultures and historical periods. It showcased Schurtz's ability to synthesize vast amounts of information and his innovative approach to understanding cultural evolution.
