= Harry Falk (Indologist) =

Professor of Indology in Berlin

Harry Falk (born 1947 in Emmendingen) is a retired professor of Indology at the Freie Universität in Berlin. He has also been Director of the Institute of Indian Philology and Art History at the Free University in Berlin. He is a noted Indologist.

== Kushan era ==
He realized that the astrological Sanskrit-Text Yavanajātaka (79,15) defined the era of the Kushans, i.e. of Kaniṣka I, as śaka 149, that is AD 227. This he linked to the long-established practice of the “dropped hundreds”, which allowed to include contemporary data from the Chinese annals Hou Hanshu. The start of the Kushan era was so defined in AD 127. In addition, it became apparent that the Kushan era was used with dropped hundreds up to the fifth century under Gupta rule in Western India.

== Works ==
- Quellen des Pañcatantra (Freiburger Beiträge zur Indologie) (German Edition, 1978) ISBN 978-3447019569
- Bruderschaft und Würfelspiel: Untersuchungen zur Entwicklungsgeschichte des vedischen Opfers (German Edition, 1986) ISBN 978-3925270000
- Schrift im alten Indien: Ein Forschungsbericht mit Anmerkungen (ScriptOralia, German Edition, 1993) ISBN 978-3823342717
- Asokan Sites and Artefacts: A Source-Book with Bibliography Mainz 2006 ISBN 978-3805337120
- The tidal waves of Indian history in "Between the Empires: Society in India 300 BCE to 400 CE" (Oxford University Press 2006)
- Foreign terms in Sanskrit in "The Idea of Writing: Play and Complexity (Brill, 2010)
- Harisyenalekhapañcasika: Fifty Selected Papers on Indian Epigraphy and Chronology, 2014 ISBN 978-3944312040
