= Sennoy, Russia =

Sennoy (Russian: Сенной; masculine), Sennaya (Сенная; feminine), or Sennoye (Сенное; neuter) is the name of several inhabited localities in Russia.

== Modern localities ==
Urban localities

- Sennoy, Saratov Oblast, a work settlement in Volsky District of Saratov Oblast

Rural localities

- Sennoy, Astrakhan Oblast, a settlement in Akhmatovsky Selsoviet of Narimanovsky District in Astrakhan Oblast; 46°27′N 48°2′E
- Sennoy, Chelyabinsk Oblast, a settlement in Sukhorechensky Selsoviet of Kartalinsky District in Chelyabinsk Oblast
- Sennoy, Krasnodar Krai, a settlement in Sennoy Rural Okrug of Temryuksky District in Krasnodar Krai; 45°18′N 37°0′E
- Sennoy, Volgograd Oblast, a khutor in Sennovsky Selsoviet of Mikhaylovsky District in Volgograd Oblast
- Sennoye, Sevsky District, Bryansk Oblast, a selo in Dobrovodsky Rural Administrative Okrug of Sevsky District in Bryansk Oblast; 52°6′N 34°36′E
- Sennoye, Zlynkovsky District, Bryansk Oblast, a village under the administrative jurisdiction of Vyshkovsky Settlement Administrative Okrug in Zlynkovsky District of Bryansk Oblast; 52°30′N 31°39′E
- Sennoye, Republic of Crimea, a selo in Belogorsky District of the Republic of Crimea
- Sennoye, Krasnoyarsk Krai, a village in Turovsky Selsoviet of Abansky District in Krasnoyarsk Krai
- Sennoye, Kursk Oblast, a khutor in Verkhneapochensky Selsoviet of Sovetsky District in Kursk Oblast
- Sennoye, Orenburg Oblast, a selo in Senninsky Selsoviet of Perevolotsky District in Orenburg Oblast
- Sennoye, Smolensk Oblast, a village in Arnishitskoye Rural Settlement of Ugransky District in Smolensk Oblast
- Sennoye, Voronezh Oblast, a selo in Karachunskoye Rural Settlement of Ramonsky District in Voronezh Oblast
- Sennaya, Kaluga Oblast, a village in Meshchovsky District of Kaluga Oblast
- Sennaya, Kostroma Oblast, a selo in Chukhlomskoye Settlement of Chukhlomsky District in Kostroma Oblast; 58°46′N 42°29′E
- Sennaya, Pskov Oblast, a village in Novorzhevsky District of Pskov Oblast
- Sennaya, Sverdlovsk Oblast, a village in Staroartinsky Selsoviet of Artinsky District in Sverdlovsk Oblast
- Sennaya, Zabaykalsky Krai, a selo in Nerchinsky District of Zabaykalsky Krai

== Alternative names ==
- Sennaya, alternative name of Sennoy, a settlement in Sennoy Rural Okrug of Temryuksky District in Krasnodar Krai; 45°18′N 37°0′E
