= Pazard =

Pazard or Pa Zard (Persian: پازرد) may refer to:

- Pazard, Jask, Hormozgan Province
- Pazard, alternate name for Aghushk Khoshk Kari, Hormozgan Province
- Pazard, Sistan and Baluchestan
