= Caucasus =

Region spanning Europe and Asia

- Topography of the Caucasus
- Coordinates: 42°45′N 44°30′E
- Countries: Armenia; Azerbaijan; Georgia; Russia
- Demonym: Caucasian
- Time Zones: UTC+03:00 and UTC+04:00
- Highest mountain: Elbrus (5,642 m (18,510 ft))

The Caucasus (/ˈkɔːkəsəs/ KAW-kə-səss) (Note: In less common academic usage, it is sometimes also known as Caucasia (/kɔːˈkeɪʒə/ kaw-KAY-zhə)) is a geographical region spanning Eastern Europe and Western Asia. It is situated between the Black Sea and the Caspian Sea, comprising parts of Southern Russia, Georgia, Armenia, and Azerbaijan. The Caucasus Mountains, including the Greater Caucasus range, have conventionally been considered as a natural barrier between Europe and Asia, bisecting the Eurasian landmass. Mount Elbrus, Europe's highest mountain, is situated in the Western Caucasus area near the Georgia–Russia border. On the southern side, the Lesser Caucasus includes the Javakheti Plateau and the Armenian highlands.

The Caucasus is divided into the North Caucasus and South Caucasus, although the Western Caucasus also exists as a distinct geographic space within the North Caucasus. The Greater Caucasus mountain range in the north is mostly shared by Russia and Georgia as well as the northernmost parts of Azerbaijan. The Lesser Caucasus mountain range in the south is mostly located on the territory of southern Georgia, Armenia, and Azerbaijan. The region is known for its linguistic diversity: aside from Indo-European and Turkic languages, the Kartvelian, Northwest Caucasian, and Northeast Caucasian language families are indigenous to the area.

== Origin of the name ==
Pliny the Elder's Natural History (77–79 AD) derives the name of the Caucasus from a Scythian name, Croucasis, which supposedly means 'shimmering with snow'. German linguist Paul Kretschmer notes that the Latvian word kruvesis also means 'frozen mud'.

Isidore of Seville's Etymologies (c. 625 AD) also says the name means shining white like snow:

Thus, toward the east, where it rises to a greater height, it is called the Caucasus, due to the whiteness of its snow, for in an eastern language, caucasus means "white," that is, shining white with a very thick snow cover. For the same reason the Scythians, who live next to this mountain range, call it Croacasim, for among them whiteness or snow is called casim. 3. The Taurus range is likewise called the Caucasus by many.

In the Tale of Past Years (1113 AD), it is stated that Old East Slavic Кавкасийскыѣ горы (Kavkasijskyě gory) came from Ancient Greek Καύκασος (Kaúkasos), which, according to M. A. Yuyukin, is a compound word that can be interpreted as the 'mountain of the seagull(s)' (καύ-: καύαξ, καύηξ, -ηκος, κήξ, κηϋξ 'a kind of seagull' + the reconstructed *κάσος 'mountain' or 'rock' richly attested both in place and personal names).

In Georgian tradition, the term Caucasus is derived from Caucas (Georgian: კავკასოსი Ḳavḳasosi), the son of the Biblical Togarmah and legendary forefather of the Nakh peoples.

According to German philologists Otto Schrader and Alfons A. Nehring, the Ancient Greek word Καύκασος (Kaukasos) is connected to Gothic hauhs 'high' as well as Lithuanian kaũkas 'hillock' and kaukarà 'hill, top', Russian куча 'heap'. British linguist Adrian Room claims that *kau- also means 'mountain' in Pelasgian, though this is speculative given that Pelasgian is so poorly known.

== Toponyms ==
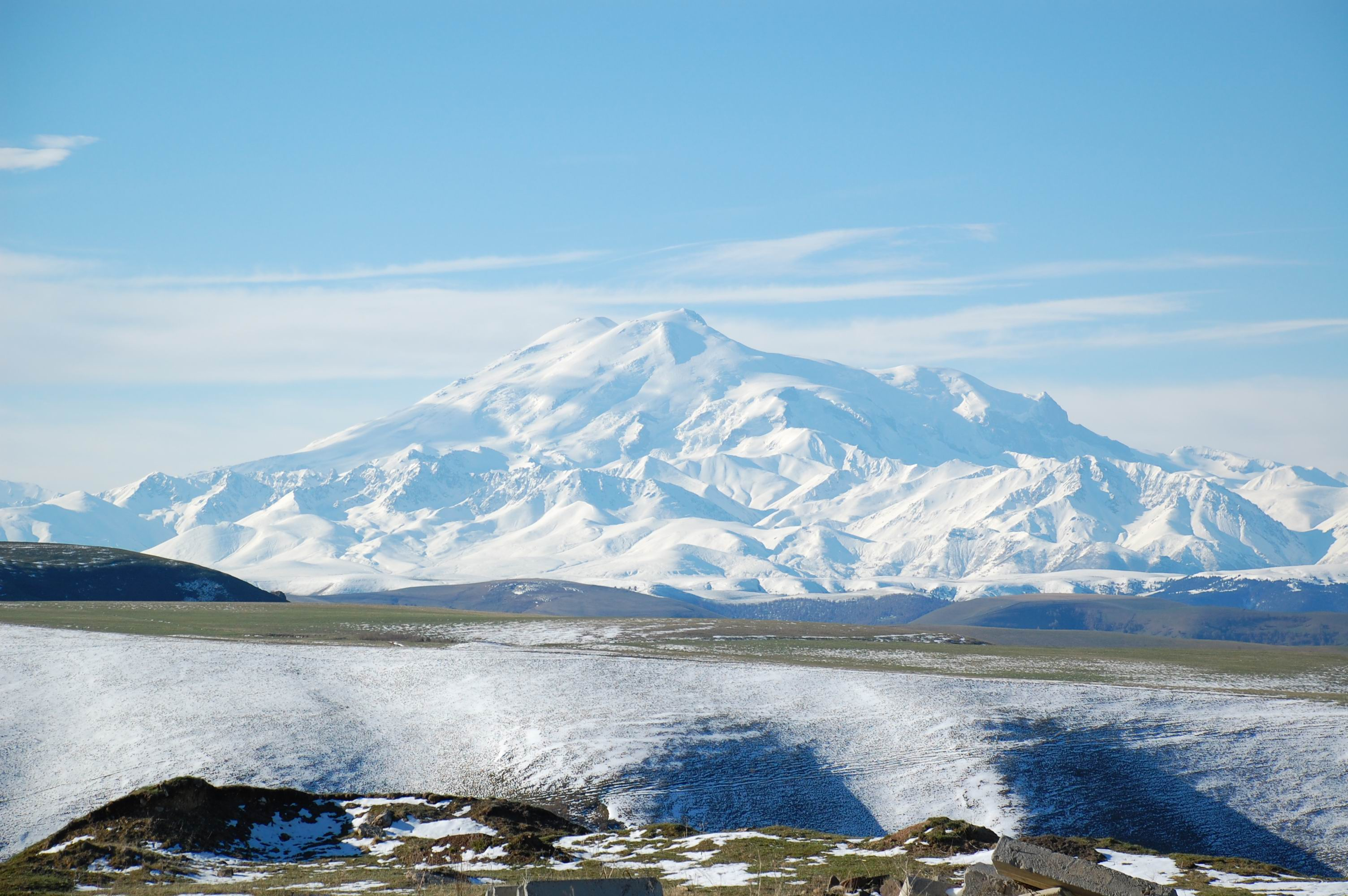
Mount Elbrus

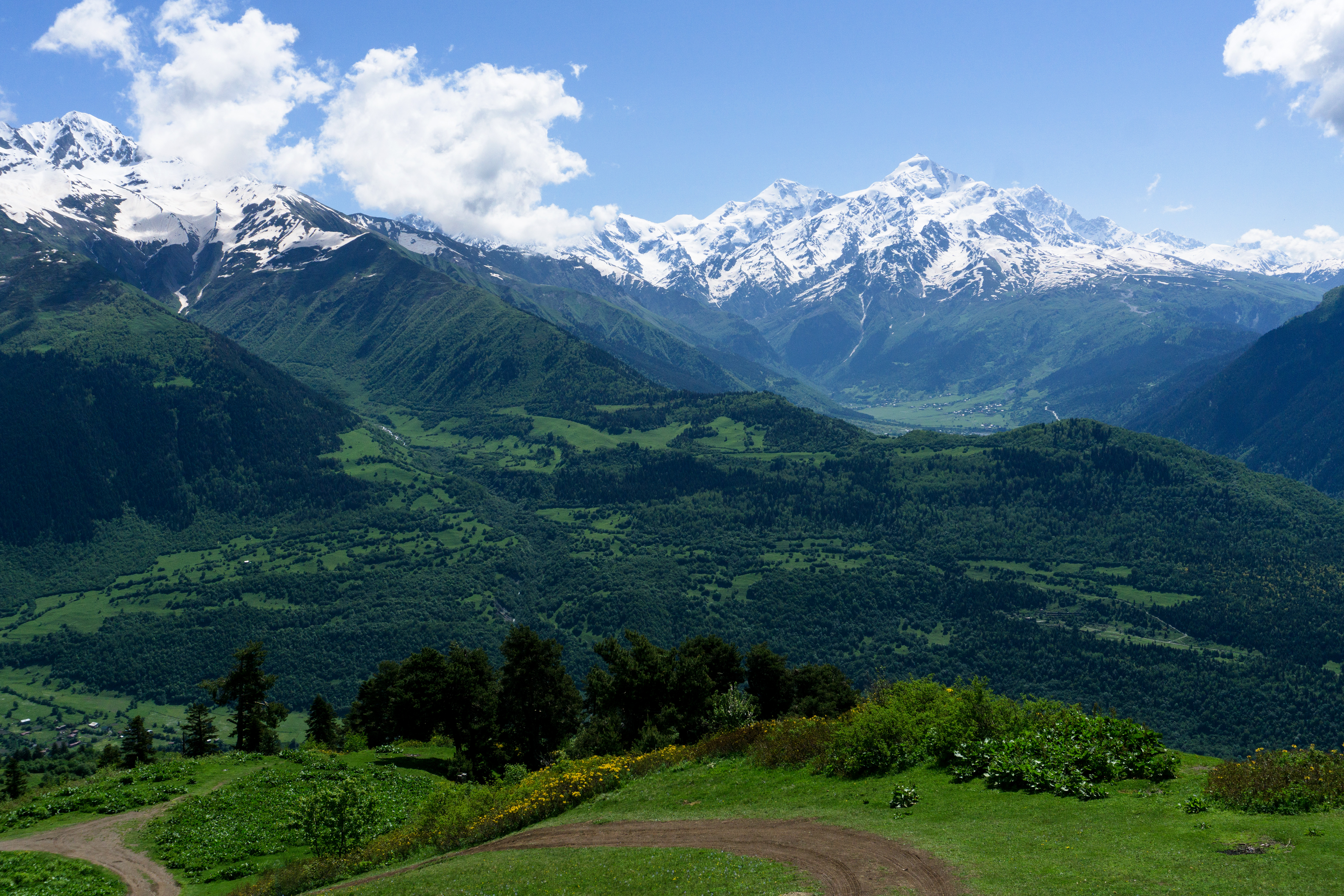
Caucasus mountains in Svaneti, Georgia

The term Caucasus is not only used for the mountains themselves but also includes North Caucasus (which is part of the Russian Federation) and South Caucasus. According to Alexander Mikaberidze, Transcaucasia is a "Russo-centric" term.

In Middle Persian sources of the Sasanian era, the Caucasus range was referred to as Kaf Kof. The term resurfaced in Iranian tradition later on in a variant form when Ferdowsi, in his Shahnameh, referred to the Caucasus mountains as Kōh-i Kāf. "Most of the modern names of the Caucasus originate from the Greek Kaukasos (Lat., Caucasus) and the Middle Persian Kaf Kof".

"The earliest etymon" of the name Caucasus comes from Kaz-kaz, the Hittite designation of the "inhabitants of the southern coast of the Black Sea".

It was also noted that in Nakh Ков гас (Kov gas) means "gateway to steppe".

== Political geography ==
The North Caucasus region is also known as the Ciscaucasus, whereas the South Caucasus region is alternatively known as the Transcaucasus.

The North Caucasus contains most of the Greater Caucasus mountain range. It consists of Southern Russia, mainly the North Caucasian Federal District's autonomous republics and the Krais in Southern Russia, and the northernmost parts of Georgia and Azerbaijan. The North Caucasus lies between the Black Sea to its west, the Caspian Sea to its east, and borders the Southern Federal District to its north. The two Federal Districts are collectively referred to as "Southern Russia".

Contemporary political map of the Caucasus, including disputed territories of Georgia and federal regions of Russia.

The South Caucasus borders the Greater Caucasus range and Southern Russia to its north, the Black Sea and Turkey to its west, the Caspian Sea to its east, and Iran to its south. It contains the Lesser Caucasus mountain range and surrounding lowlands. All of Armenia, Azerbaijan (excluding the northernmost parts), and Georgia (excluding the northernmost parts) are in the South Caucasus.

The watershed along the Greater Caucasus range is considered by some sources to be the dividing line between Europe and Southwest Asia. According to that, the highest peak in the Caucasus, Mount Elbrus (5,642 meters) located in western Ciscaucasus, is considered the highest point in Europe. The Kuma-Manych Depression, the geologic depression that divides the Russian Plain from the North Caucasus foreland is often regarded by classical and non-British sources as the natural and historical boundary between Europe and Asia. Another opinion is that the rivers Kura and Rioni mark this border, or even that of the river Aras.

The Caucasus is a linguistically, culturally and geographically diverse region. The nation states that compose the Caucasus today are the post-Soviet states Georgia (including Adjara and Abkhazia), Azerbaijan (including Nakhchivan), Armenia, and the Russian Federation. The Russian divisions include Dagestan, Chechnya, Ingushetia, North Ossetia–Alania, Kabardino–Balkaria, Karachay–Cherkessia, Adygea, Krasnodar Krai, and Stavropol Krai, in clockwise order.

Two territories in the region claim independence but are recognized as such by only a handful of entities: Abkhazia, and South Ossetia. Abkhazia and South Ossetia are largely recognized by the world community as part of Georgia.

== Demographics ==
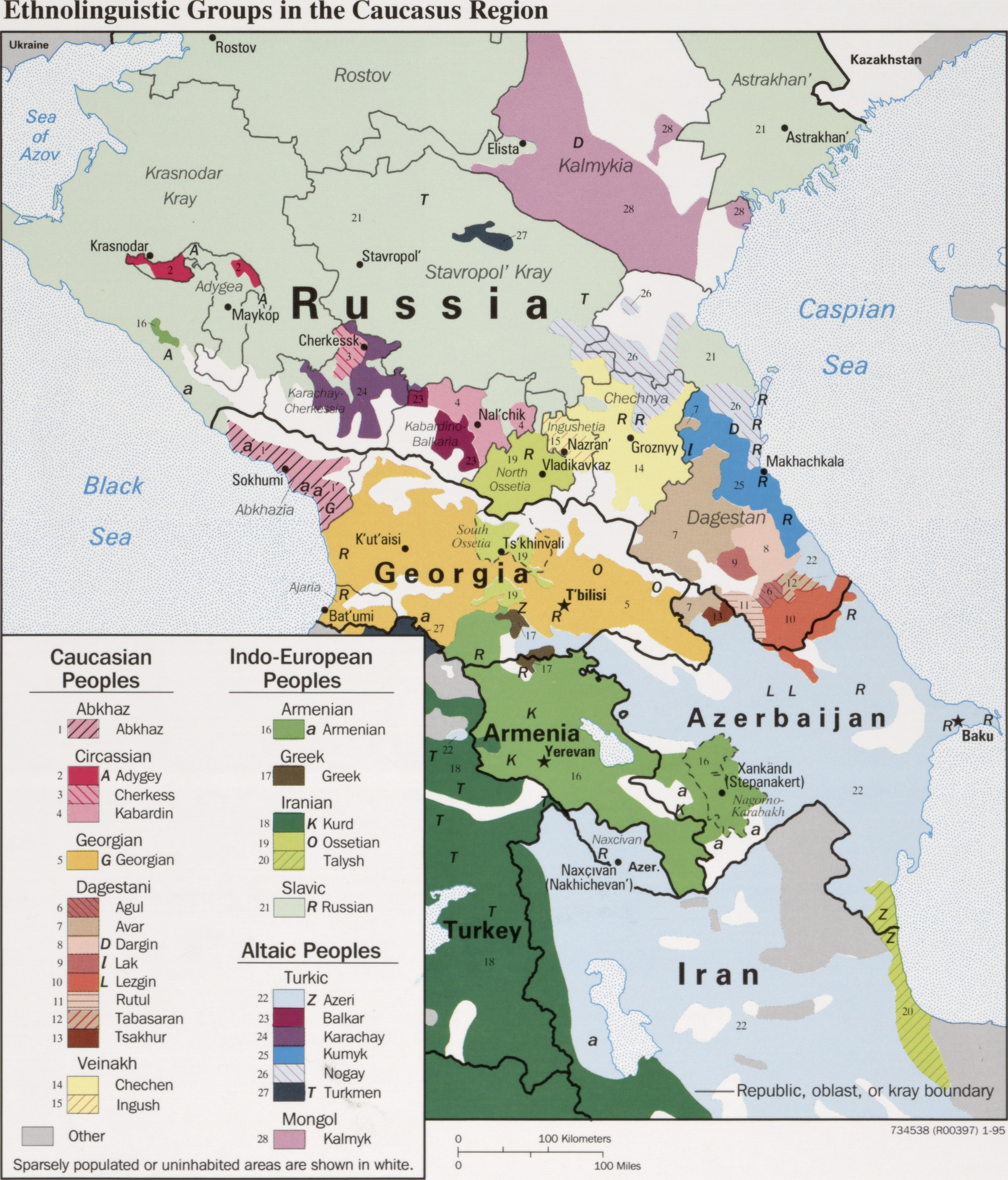
Ethno-linguistic groups of the Caucasus according to CIA estimates in 1995.

The region has many different languages and language families. There are more than 50 ethnic groups living in the region. No fewer than three language families are unique to the area, such as Kartvelian languages spoken in Georgia. In addition, Indo-European languages, such as East Slavic, Armenian and Ossetian, and Turkic languages, such as Azerbaijani, Kumyk language and Karachay–Balkar, are spoken in the area. Russian is used as a lingua franca, most notably in the North Caucasus, though in the south its reach has waned since the collapse of the USSR.

In the North Caucasus, the Russian krais of Krasnodar and Stavropol, as well as North Ossetia–Alania are predominantly Eastern Orthodox Christians, while the remaining regions are Sunni Muslim. In the southern part of the region, Georgia is predominantly Orthodox Christian, Armenia is Armenian Apostolic, while Azerbaijan is Shia Muslim.

== History ==
Located on the peripheries of various large empires, the region has been an arena for political, military, religious, and cultural rivalries and expansionism for centuries.

=== Prehistory ===
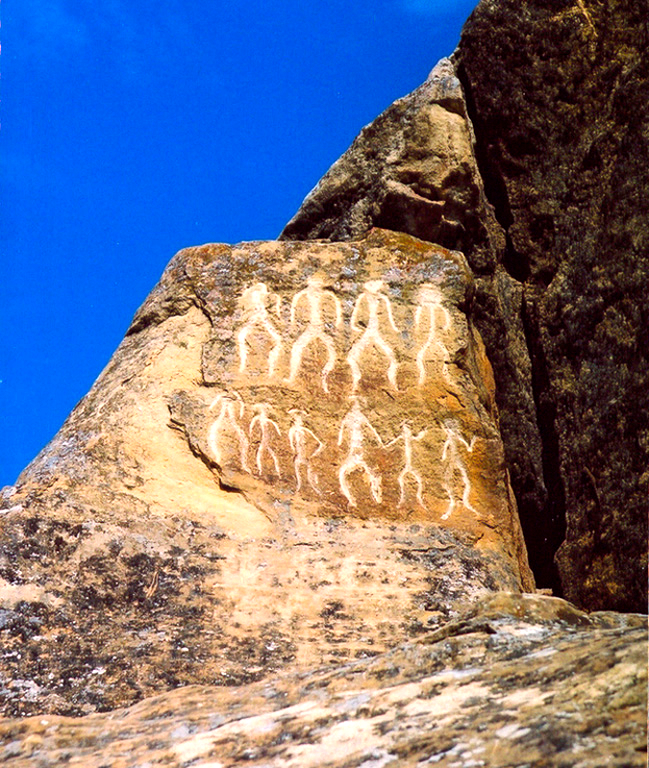
Petroglyphs in Gobustan, Azerbaijan, a UNESCO World Heritage Site, dating back to 10,000 BC

The territory of the Caucasus region was inhabited by Homo erectus since the Paleolithic Era. In 1991, early Hominini fossils dating back 1.8 million years were found at the Dmanisi archaeological site in Georgia. Scientists now classify the assemblage of fossil skeletons as the subspecies Homo erectus georgicus.

The site yields the earliest unequivocal evidence for the presence of early humans outside the African continent; and the Dmanisi skulls are the five oldest hominins ever found outside Africa.

=== Bronze Age ===
Kura–Araxes culture from about 4000 BC until about 2000 BC enveloped a vast area of approximately 1,000 km by 500 km, and mostly encompassed, on modern-day territories, the Southern Caucasus (except western Georgia), northwestern Iran, the northeastern Caucasus, eastern Turkey, and as far as Syria. Other Notable cultures include Shulaveri-Shomu culture, the Trialeti culture, the Colchian culture and others.

The first bronze age states in the caucasus consolidated around the 15th-10th centuries BC. It includes the Kartvelian Kingdom of Kulha and Diauehi, the Kingdom of Urartu, Shupria and Hayasa-Azzi in the armenian hightlands. The region would experience several assyrian invasions, notably the ones Led by Shalmaneser I, Tukulti-Ninurta I and Tiglath-Pileser I. Urartu and Kulha would experience their respective Golden ages in the 8th century BC, before being invaded by Scythians and Cimmerians, a group of iranic speaking nomads who are theorised to be the ancestors of modern Ossetians.

=== Antiquity ===
==== Archaic age ====
The Iranic invasions caused the collapse of bronze age societies, which gave way for foreign interventions - The Greeks started colonising the Black sea coast and became responsible for the cretion of Trapezounta (Trabzon), Rizounta (Rize), Athina (Pazar) , Apsaros (Gonio), Bathys limen (Batumi), Phasis (Poti ), Gyenos (Ochamchire), Dioscuria (Sukhumi), Pitiunt (Pitsunda) , Tryglite (Gagra), Gorgippia (Anapa), Phanagoria (Sennoy), Hermonassa (Taman village) and more. Greek colonisation gave raise to new trading routes which facilitated trade, making the region significantly more valuable. Trade with Miletus caused the consolidation of the hellenistic Kingdoms of Colchis and Sindica. Eastern caucasus came under Achaemenid Hegemony - the Persians managed to annex Urartu from Media, southern Azerbaijan and southen Georgia while vassalizing the north. The achaemenid Behistun inscription contains the first mention of Armenia. The last achaemenid King, Darius III, is known to have started out as a Satrap of Armenia.

==== Hellenistic era ====
In the aftermath of Alexanders conquests, all of the caucasus came under Greek cultural domination. The creation of Iberia under Pharnavaz I is directly connected to Alexander, the modern toponym of Azerbaijan derives from a general of Alexander - Atropates, the Artaxiad empire) would form after gaining its independence from the Selucid empire, a successor to Alexanders empire. A confederation of Lezgic tribes - the kingdom of Albania came to exist on territory of modern Azerbaijan. All of those states - Colchis, Iberia, Armenia and Albania - were hellenistic societies (had incorporated a huge amount of Greek culture). All of them used Greek alphabet, interacted with the rest of the Greek world and Used Greek architecture. The largest surviving hellenistic epic - The Argonautica - is an epic about greek adventurers exploring Colchis. Armenia would experience a period of growth under Tigranes the Great, who is famous for annexing Syria, vassalizing Sophene and Commagene and founding the new Armenia capital-Tigranocerta. Urbanisation tool place in Other caucasian states too. Mtskheta, the capital of Iberia, had a sophisticated sewage system. In Colchis, Phasis had a theatre, a rhetotical school and a giant statue of the river God Phasis. Major pagan centers included Vani, Kabala, Garni and Armazi.

==== Roman era ====
The region would be contested between the Rome and Parthia by the time of the first century BC, Zoroastrianism had become the dominant religion of the region; however, the region would go through two other religious transformations. Owing to the strong rivalry between Persia and Rome, and later Byzantium. The Romans first arrived in the region in the 1st century BC with the annexation of the kingdom of Colchis, which was later turned into the province of Lazicum. The next 600 years were marked by a conflict between Rome and the Sassanid Empire for the control of the region. In western Georgia, eastern Roman rule lasted until the Middle Ages.

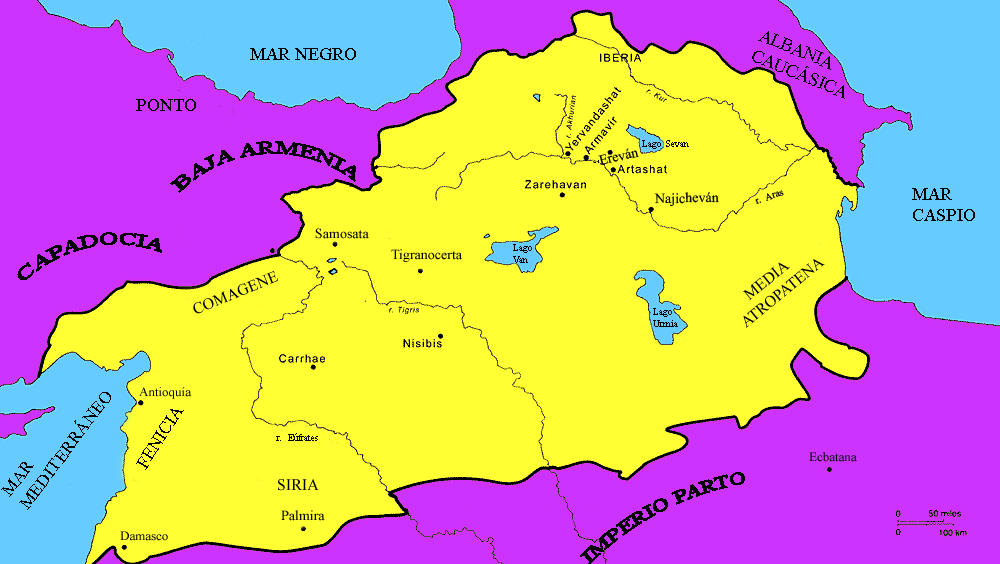
Kingdom of Armenia at the peak of its might at the beginning of the 1st century B.C.

=== Middle Ages ===
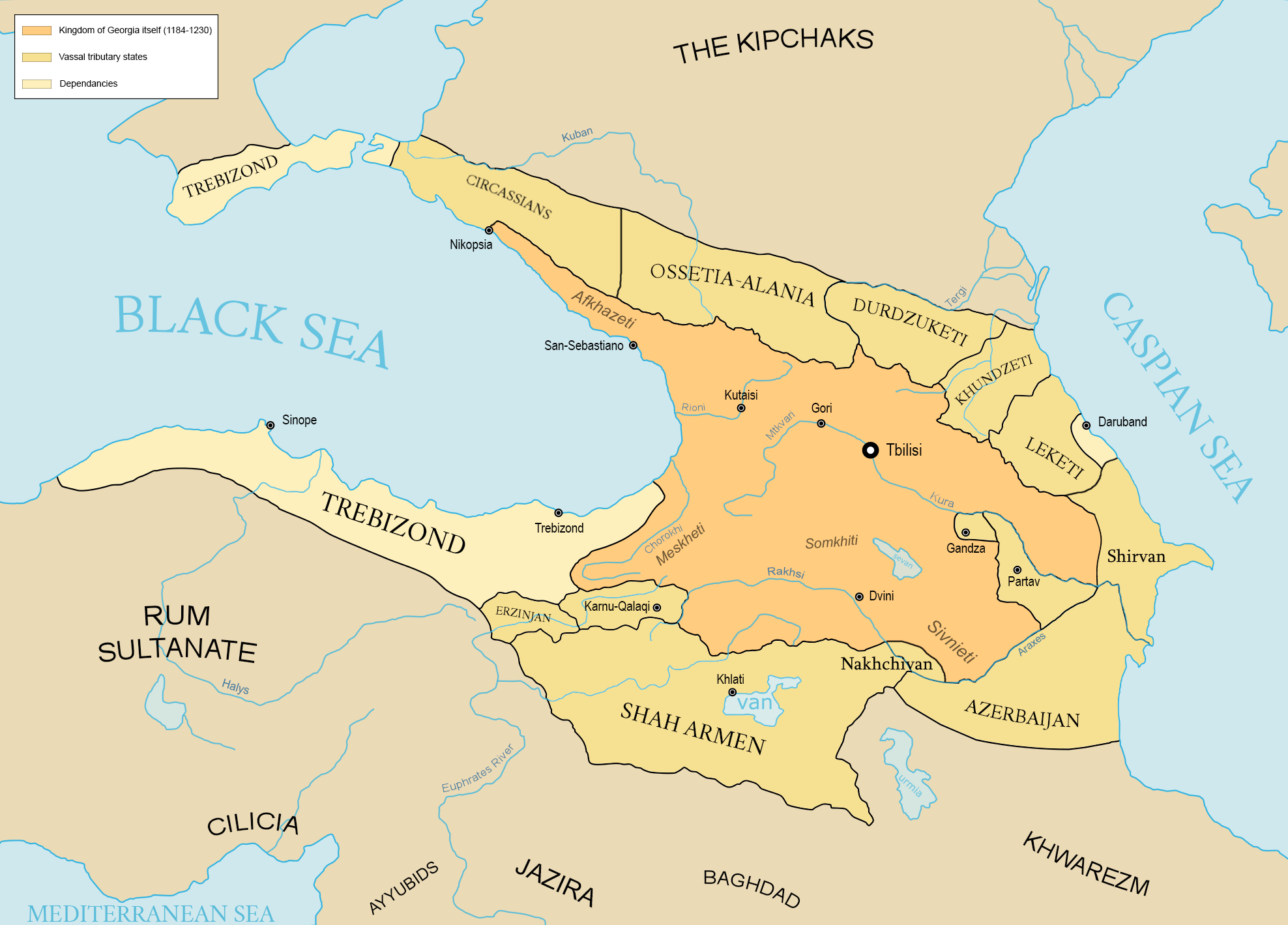
Kingdom of Georgia at the peak of its might, early 13th century.

As the Arsacid dynasty of Armenia (an eponymous branch of the Arsacid dynasty of Parthia) was the first nation to adopt Christianity as state religion (in 301 AD), and Caucasian Albania and Georgia had become Christian entities, Christianity began to overtake Zoroastrianism and pagan beliefs. With the Muslim conquest of Persia, large parts of the region came under the rule of the Arabs, and Islam penetrated the region.

In the 10th century, the Alans (proto-Ossetians) founded the Kingdom of Alania, that flourished in the Northern Caucasus, roughly in the location of latter-day Circassia and modern North Ossetia–Alania, until its destruction by the Mongol invasion of Alania in 1238–39.

During the Middle Ages, Bagratid Armenia, the Kingdom of Tashir-Dzoraget, the Kingdom of Syunik, the Principality of Khachen and the greater local Armenian population faced multiple threats after the fall of the antiquated Kingdom of Armenia. Caucasian Albania maintained close ties with Armenia and the Church of Caucasian Albania shared the same Christian dogmas with the Armenian Apostolic Church and had a tradition of their Catholicos being ordained through the Patriarch of Armenia.

In the 12th century, the Georgian king David the Builder drove the Muslims out of the Caucasus and made the Kingdom of Georgia a strong regional power. In 1194–1204 Georgian Queen Tamar's armies crushed new Seljuk Turkish invasions from the southeast and south and launched several successful campaigns into Seljuk Turkish-controlled Southern Armenia. The Georgian Kingdom continued military campaigns in the Caucasus region. As a result of her military campaigns and the temporary fall of the Byzantine Empire in 1204, Georgia became the strongest Christian state in the whole Near East area, encompassing most of the Caucasus stretching from Northern Iran and Northeastern Turkey to the North Caucasus.

In the subsequent centuries, the Caucasus region was conquered by the Ottomans, Turco-Mongols, as well as, once again, Iran.

=== Modern period ===
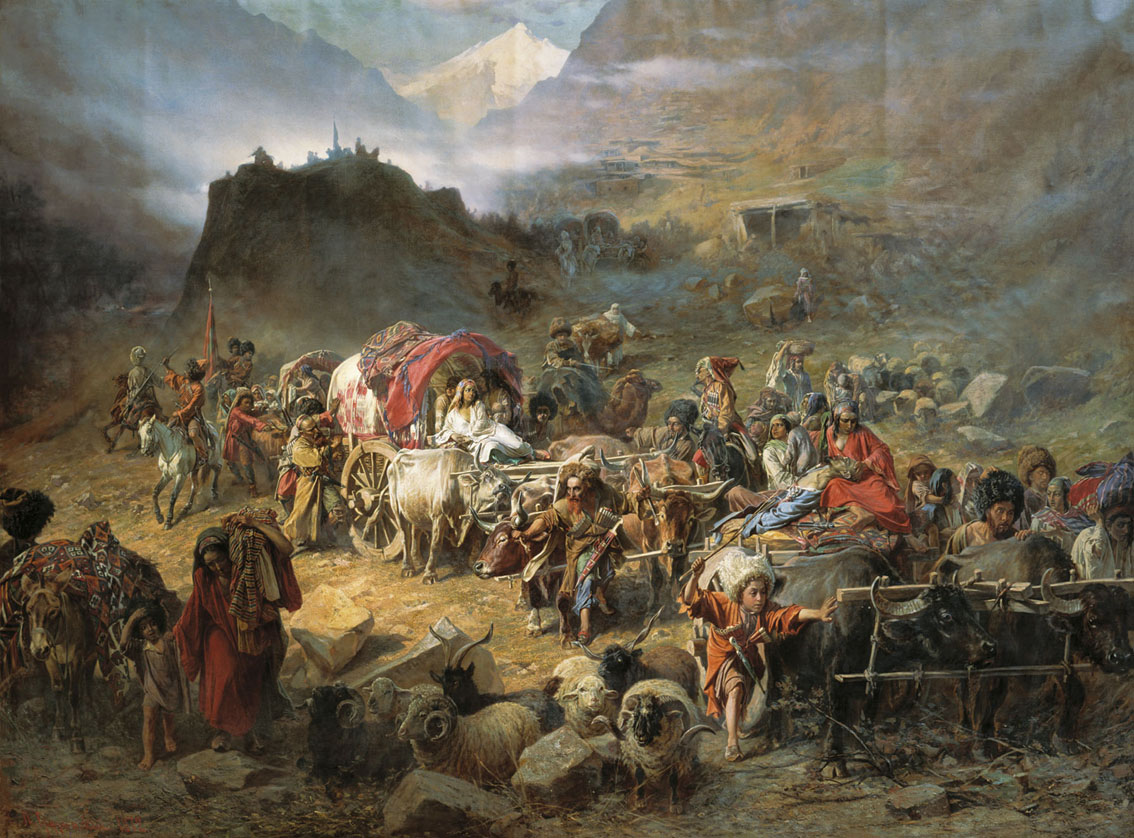
A scene from the Caucasian War, by Pyotr Gruzinsky

Up to the early 19th century, most of the Southern Caucasus and southern Dagestan were fractured and split into spheres of influence exerted by the Ottoman Empire in the west and Persian Empire to the east. This status quo began to unravel after the Treaty of Küçük Kaynarca of 1774, with the subsequent decades seeing incremental Russian expansion in the Caucasus. In 1783, the eastern Georgian Kingdom of Kartli-Kakheti, worn out by decades of conflict with neighboring Muslim powers, signed the Treaty of Georgievsk with the expanding Russian Empire, placing itself under Russian protection. However, Russia soon violated the treaty and annexed the kingdom in 1801, abolishing the eastern Georgian monarchy and installing a Russian general to govern the region. In the ensuing years after these gains, the Russians took the remaining part of the Southern Caucasus, comprising western Georgia, through several wars from the Ottoman Empire.

In the second half of the 19th century, the Russian Empire also conquered the North Caucasus. In the aftermath of the Caucasian Wars, the Russian military perpetrated an ethnic cleansing of Circassians, expelling this indigenous population from its homeland. Between the 1850s and World War I, about a million North Caucasian Muslims arrived in the Ottoman Empire as refugees.

Having killed and deported most of the Armenians of Western Armenia during the Armenian genocide, the Turks intended to eliminate the Armenian population of Eastern Armenia. During the 1920 Turkish–Armenian War, 60,000 to 98,000 Armenian civilians were estimated to have been killed by the Turkish army.

In the 1940s, around 480,000 Chechens and Ingush, 120,000 Karachay–Balkars and Meskhetian Turks, thousands of Kalmyks, and 200,000 Kurds in Nakchivan and Caucasus Germans were deported en masse to Central Asia and Siberia by the Soviet security apparatus. About a quarter of them died.

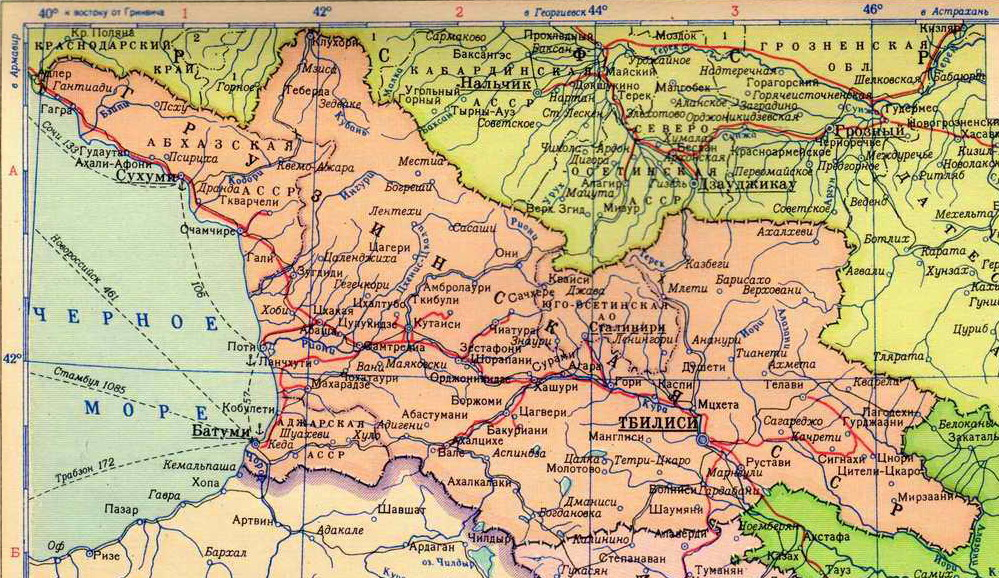
Georgian Soviet Socialist Republic in the mid-20th century, when it included a number of territories in the North Caucasus.

The Southern Caucasus region was unified as a single political entity twice – during the Russian Civil War (Transcaucasian Democratic Federative Republic) from 9 April 1918 to 26 May 1918, and under the Soviet rule (Transcaucasian SFSR) from 12 March 1922 to 5 December 1936. Following the dissolution of the Soviet Union in 1991, Georgia, Azerbaijan and Armenia became independent nations.

The region has been subject to various territorial disputes since the collapse of the Soviet Union, leading to the First Nagorno-Karabakh War (1988–1994), the East Prigorodny Conflict (1989–1991), the War in Abkhazia (1992–93), the First Chechen War (1994–1996), the Second Chechen War (1999–2009), Russo-Georgian War (2008), the Second Nagorno-Karabakh War (2020) and the 2023 Azerbaijani offensive in Nagorno-Karabakh.

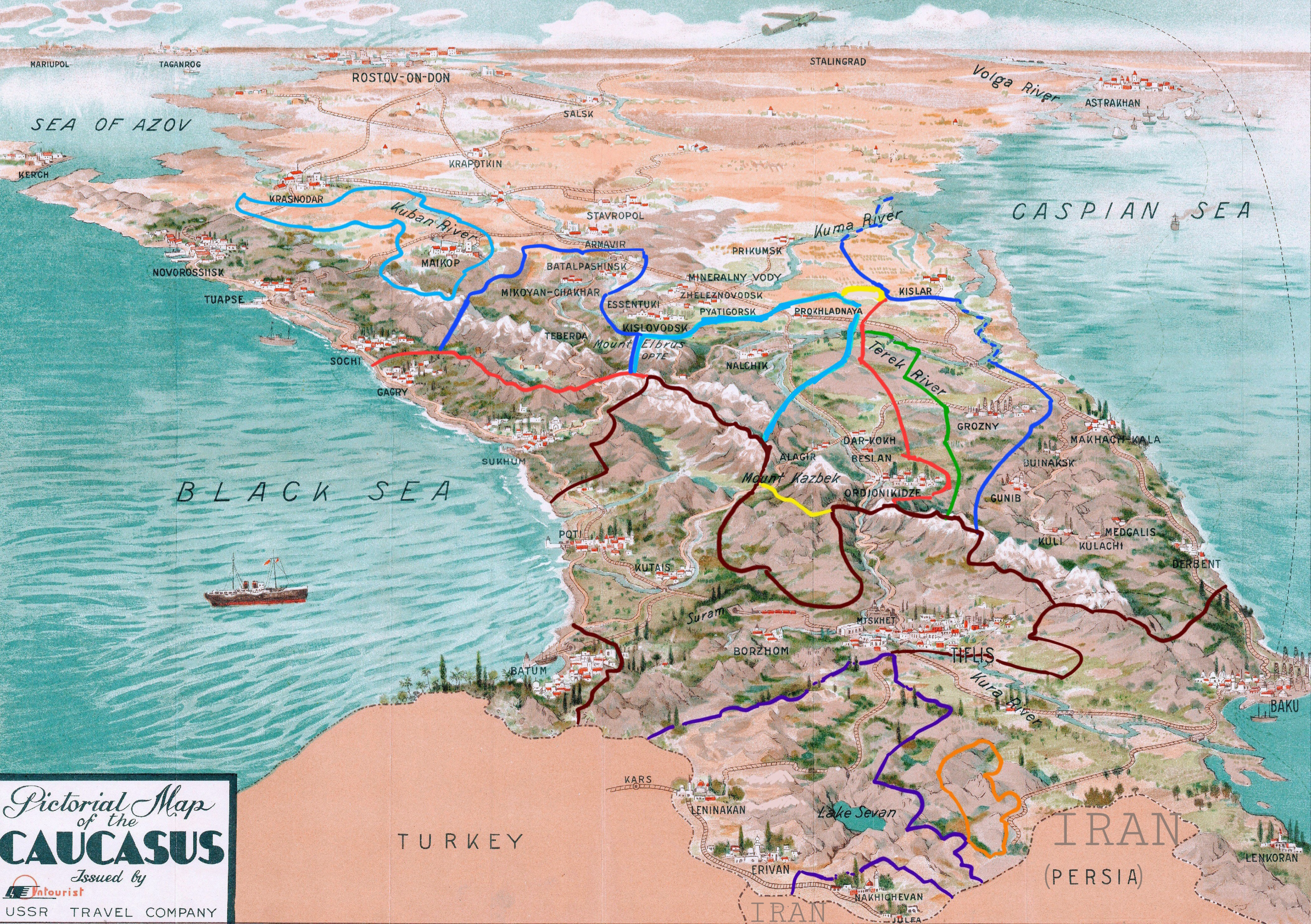
Pictorial tourist map of the Caucasus created by the USSR Travel Company

== Mythology ==
In Greek mythology, the Caucasus was one of the pillars supporting the world. After presenting man with the gift of fire, Prometheus (or Amirani in the Georgian version) was chained there by Zeus, to have his liver eaten daily by an eagle as punishment for defying Zeus's wish to keep the "secret of fire" from humans.

In Persian mythology, the Caucasus might be associated with the mythic Mount Qaf which is believed to surround the known world. It is the battlefield of Saoshyant and the nest of the Simurgh.

The Roman poet Ovid placed the Caucasus in Scythia and depicted it as a cold and stony mountain which was the abode of personified hunger. The Greek hero Jason sailed to the west coast of the Caucasus in pursuit of the Golden Fleece, and there met Medea, a daughter of King Aeëtes of Colchis.

=== Later folklore ===
The Caucasus has a rich folklore tradition. This tradition has been preserved orally—necessitated by the fact that for most of the languages involved, there was no alphabet until the early twentieth century—and only began to be written down in the late nineteenth century. One important tradition is that of the Nart sagas, which tell stories of a race of ancient heroes called the Narts. These sagas include such figures as Satanaya, the mother of the Narts, Sosruquo a shape changer and trickster, Tlepsh a blacksmith god, and Batradz, a mighty hero. The folklore of the Caucasus shows ancient Iranian Zoroastrian influence, involves battles with ancient Goths, Huns and Khazars, and contains many connections with ancient Indian, Norse Scandinavian, and Greek cultures.

=== Links between Greek mythology and subsequent folklore ===
Caucasian folklore contains many links with the myths of the ancient Greeks. There are resemblances between the mother goddess Satanaya and the Greek goddess of love Aphrodite. The story of how the trickster Nart Sosruquo, became invulnerable parallels that of the Greek hero Achilles. The ancient Greek Amazons may be connected to a Caucasian "warrior Forest-Mother, Amaz-an"; it is also said that the Amazons and the Gargareans went to live separately in the foothills of the Caucasus Mountains, then called Ceraunia, after leaving Themiscyra.

Caucasian legends include stories involving giants similar to Homer's Polyphemus story. In these stories, the giant is almost always a shepherd, and he is variously a one-eyed rock-throwing cannibal, who lives in a cave (the exit of which is often blocked by a stone), kills the hero's companions, is blinded by a hot stake, and whose flock of animals is stolen by the hero and his men, all motifs which (along with still others) are also found in the Polyphemus story. In one example from Georgia, two brothers, who are being held prisoner by a giant one-eyed shepherd called "One-eye", take a spit, heat it up, stab it into the giant's eye, and escape.

There are also links with the ancient Greek myth of Prometheus. Many legends, widespread in the Caucasus, contain motifs shared with the Prometheus story. These motifs include a giant hero, his conflict with God or gods, the stealing of fire and giving it to men, being chained, and being tormented by a bird who pecks at his liver (or heart). The Adyge/Circassian Nart Nasran, the Georgian Amirani, the Vainakh Pkharmat, and the Abkhazian Abrskil, are examples of such Prometheus-like figures.

== Ecology ==
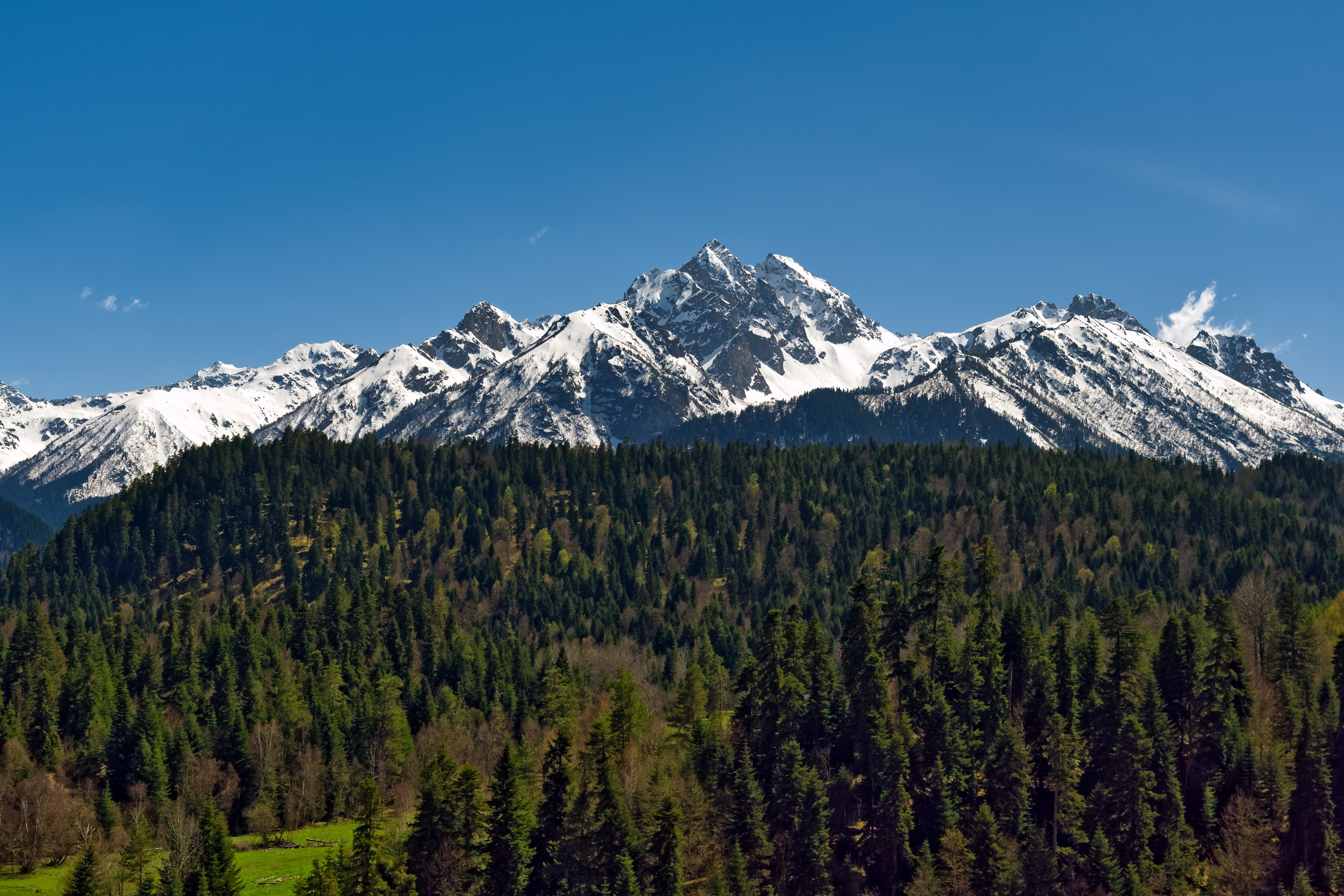
View of the Caucasus Mountains in Arkhyz, Karachay-Cherkessia region of Russia

The Caucasus is an area of great ecological importance. The region is included in the list of 34 world biodiversity hotspots. It harbors some 6400 species of higher plants, 1600 of which are endemic to the region. Its wildlife includes Persian leopards, brown bears, wolves, bison, marals, golden eagles and hooded crows. Among invertebrates, some 1000 spider species are recorded in the Caucasus. Most arthropod biodiversity is concentrated on Great and Lesser Caucasus ranges.

The region has a high level of endemism and several relict animals and plants, the fact reflecting the presence of refugial forests, which survived the Ice Age in the Caucasus Mountains. The Caucasus forest refugium is the largest throughout the Western Asian (near Eastern) region. The area has multiple representatives of disjunct relict groups of plants with the closest relatives in Eastern Asia, southern Europe, and even North America. Over 70 species of forest snails of the region are endemic. Some relict species of vertebrates are Caucasian parsley frog, Caucasian salamander, Robert's snow vole, and Caucasian grouse, and there are almost entirely endemic groups of animals such as lizards of genus Darevskia. In general, the species composition of this refugium is quite distinct and differs from that of the other Western Eurasian refugia.

The natural landscape is one of mixed forest, with substantial areas of rocky ground above the treeline. The Caucasus Mountains are also noted for a dog breed, the Caucasian Shepherd Dog (Rus. Kavkazskaya Ovcharka, Geo. Nagazi). Vincent Evans noted that minke whales have been recorded from the Black Sea.

== Energy and mineral resources ==
The Caucasus has many economically important minerals and energy resources, such as gold, silver, copper, iron ore, manganese, tungsten, zinc, oil, natural gas, and coal (both anthracite coal and brown).

== Sport ==
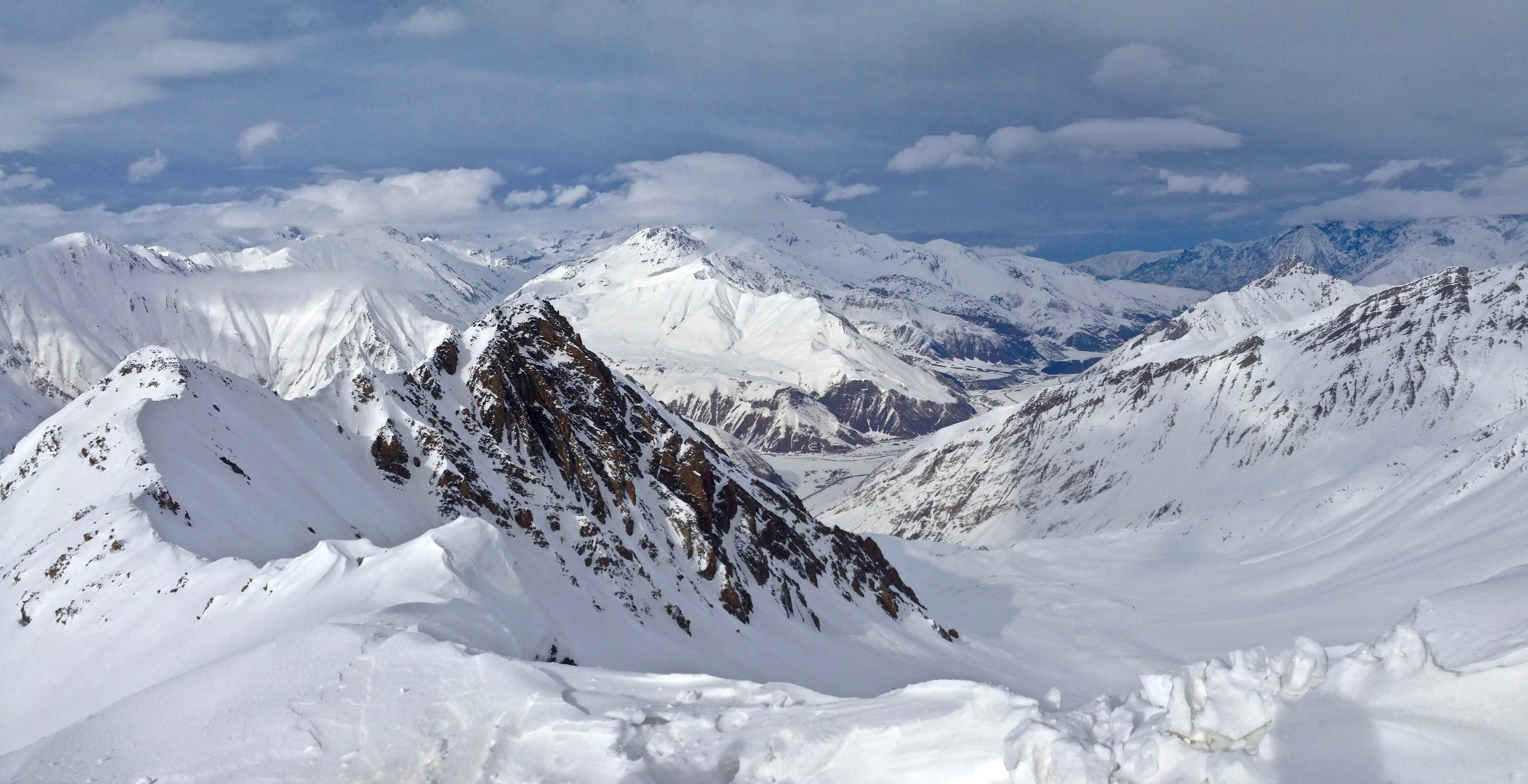
Gudauri is a popular destination for skiing, Heliskiing, and paragliding in Georgia, on the southern slopes of the Greater Caucasus mountains.

Krasnaya Polyana is a popular center of mountain skiing and a snowboard venue. Winter Olympics were held in 2014 in Sochi. The 2015 European Games were the first in the history of the European Games to be held in Azerbaijan.

Mountain-skiing complexes include:

- Alpika-Service
- Mountain roundabout
- Rosa Hutor
- Tsaghkadzor Ski Resort in Armenia
- Shahdag Winter Complex in Azerbaijan

The 2016 Azerbaijan Grand Prix (motor racing) was the first in the history of Formula One to be held in Azerbaijan. The 2017 World Rugby Under 20 Championship was held in Georgia. In 2017 the U-19 Europe Championship (Football) was held in Georgia. In 2019 the UEFA European Under-19 Championship was held in Armenia, and the 2019 UEFA Europa League final was held in Azerbaijan.

== See also ==
- Caucasian cuisine
- Community for Democracy and Rights of Nations
- Culture of Armenia
- Culture of Azerbaijan
- Culture of Georgia (country)
- Eastern Partnership
- Eurasian Economic Union
- Euronest Parliamentary Assembly
- Khanates of the Caucasus
- Prometheism
- Regions of Europe

== Sources ==
- Bachvarova, Mary R., From Hittite to Homer: The Anatolian Background of Ancient Greek Epic, Cambridge University Press, 2016. ISBN 978-0521509794.
- Coene, Frederick (2009). The Caucasus: An Introduction. Routledge. ISBN 978-0-415-48660-6.
- Colarusso, John, Nart Sagas from the Caucasus: Myths and Legends from the Circassians, Abazas, Abkhaz, and Ubykhs, Princeton University Press, 2002, 2014. ISBN 9781400865284.
- Cornell, Susan E., Small Nations and Great Powers: A Study of Ethnopolitical Conflict in the Caucasus.
- de Waal, Thomas (2010). The Caucasus: An Introduction. Oxford University Press. ISBN 978-0-19-539977-6.
- Golvin, Ivan, The Caucasus.
- Griffin, Nicholas, Caucasus: A Journey to the Land Between Christianity and Islam, University of Chicago Press, 2004. ISBN 9780226308593.
- Hamed-Troyansky, Vladimir (2024). Empire of Refugees: North Caucasian Muslims and the Late Ottoman State. Stanford, CA: Stanford University Press. ISBN 978-1-5036-3696-5.
- Hunt, David, Legends of the Caucasus, Saqi Books, London, 2012. ISBN 978-0863568237.
- Mayor, Adrienne (2016), "Introduction to the Paperback Edition" in Nart Sagas: Ancient Myths and Legends of the Circassians and Abkhazians, by John Colarusso, Princeton University Press, 2016. ISBN 978-0691-16914-9.
- Suny, Ronald Grigor (1994). The Making of the Georgian Nation (2nd ed.). Indiana University Press. ISBN 0-253-20915-3.
