= Pazarköy =

Pazarköy (literally "market village") is a place name in Turkish and may refer to:

- Pazarköy, Bolu, a town in Bolu Province, Turkey
- Pazarkoy, Ezine, a village in Ezine district of Çanakkale Province, Turkey
- Pazarköy, Nusaybin, a village in Nusaybin District of Mardin Province, Turkey
- Pazarköy, Yenice, a town in Yenice district of Çanakkale Province, Turkey

== See also ==
- Pazar (disambiguation)
- Pazarcık
- Pazaryeri
