= Sennoy =

Sennoy (masculine), Sennaya (feminine), or Sennoye (neuter) may refer to:

- Sennaya Square or Sennaya Ploshchad, St. Petersburg
- Sennaya Ploshchad (Nizhny Novgorod)
- Sennaya Ploshchad (Veliky Novgorod)
- Sennaya Ploshchad (Moscow)
- Smolenskaya-Sennaya Square
- Sennaya Ploshchad (Saint Petersburg Metro)
- Sennaya Ploshchad (Nizhny Novgorod Metro)
- Sennoy Municipal Okrug, a municipal okrug of Admiralteysky District of the federal city of St. Petersburg, Russia
- Sennoy, Russia (also Sennaya, Sennoye), several inhabited localities in Russia
- Sennoy Bridge, a bridge in St. Petersburg, Russia

== See also ==
- Sennoy, Kazakhstan, a populated place in Atyrau Region of Kazakhstan
