= Sennaya, Zabaykalsky Krai =

Sennaya Сенная
- Selo
- Location within Zabaykalsky Krai Location within Russia
- Coordinates: 52°02′N 116°23′E
- Country: Russia
- Region: Zabaykalsky Krai
- District: Nerchinsky District
- Time zone: UTC+9:00

Sennaya (Russian: Сенная) is a rural locality (a selo) in Nerchinsky District, Zabaykalsky Krai, Russia. Population: 74 (2021 census); 72 (2010 census); There is 1 street in this selo.
