= Sennoy, Astrakhan Oblast =

Sennoy Сенной
- Settlement
- Location within Astrakhan Oblast Location within Russia
- Coordinates: 46°26′N 48°02′E
- Country: Russia
- Region: Astrakhan Oblast
- District: Narimanovsky District
- Time zone: UTC+4:00

Sennoy (Russian: Сенной) is a rural locality (a settlement) in Akhmatovsky Selsoviet, Narimanovsky District, Astrakhan Oblast, Russia. The population was 132 as of 2010. There are 6 streets.

== Geography ==
Sennoy is located 58 km south of Narimanov (the district's administrative centre) by road. Astrakhan-II is the nearest rural locality.
