= Pazarköy, Nusaybin =

Village in Mardin Province, Turkey

Pazarköy
- Village
- Location in Turkey
- Coordinates: 37.166°N 41.653°E
- Country: Turkey
- Province: Mardin
- District: Nusaybin
- Population (2021): 0
- Time zone: UTC+3 (TRT)

Pazarköy (Kurdish: Bazarê; Syriac: Bāzarī) (Note: Alternatively transliterated as Bazar, Bazaré, Bâzâr, or Pazar.) is a village in the Nusaybin District of Mardin Province in Turkey. The village was populated by Yazidi Kurds of the Dasikan tribe but uninhabited as of 2021.

== History ==
Bāzarī (today called Pazarköy) was historically inhabited by Syriac Orthodox Christians. In the Syriac Orthodox patriarchal register of dues of 1870, it was recorded that the village had ten households, who paid fifty-one dues, and did not have a church or a priest. It was populated by 300 Syriacs in 1914, as per the list presented to the Paris Peace Conference by the Assyro-Chaldean delegation. There were ten Syriac families in 1915. Amidst the Sayfo, the Syriacs were escorted to safety at Basibrin. By 1987, there were no remaining Syriacs.

== Bibliography ==
- Bcheiry, Iskandar (2009). The Syriac Orthodox Patriarchal Register of Dues of 1870: An Unpublished Historical Document from the Late Ottoman Period. Gorgias Press.
- Courtois, Sébastien de (2004). The Forgotten Genocide: Eastern Christians, The Last Arameans. Translated by Vincent Aurora. Gorgias Press.
- Gaunt, David (2006). Massacres, Resistance, Protectors: Muslim-Christian Relations in Eastern Anatolia during World War I. Gorgias Press.
- Jongerden, Joost; Verheij, Jelle, eds. (2012). Social Relations in Ottoman Diyarbekir, 1870-1915. Brill.
- Tan, Altan (2018). Turabidin'den Berriye'ye. Aşiretler - Dinler - Diller - Kültürler (in Turkish). Pak Ajans Yayincilik Turizm Ve Diş Ticaret Limited şirketi. ISBN 9789944360944.
