= Pazar =

Pazar is a Turkish word for a marketplace or bazaar.

Pazar may also refer to:

== Places ==
- Pazar, Hormozgan, a village in the Iranian province Hormozgan
- Pazar, Iran, a village in the Iranian province Yazd
- Pazar, Rize, a town in the Turkish province Rize
- Pazar, Tokat, a town in the Turkish province Tokat
- Pazar, the Macedonian language name for Giannitsa, Greece

== Other ==
- Elma Pazar, a contestant on the British dating game show Love Island
- Goran Pazar, a character on the American TV show Barry

== See also ==
- Novi Pazar (disambiguation)
