= Sennoye, Voronezh Oblast =

Sennoye Сенное
- Selo
- Location within Voronezh Oblast Location within Russia
- Coordinates: 52°05′N 39°19′E
- Country: Russia
- Region: Voronezh Oblast
- District: Ramonsky District
- Time zone: UTC+3:00

Sennoye (Russian: Сенное) is a rural locality (a selo) in Karachunskoye Rural Settlement, Ramonsky District, Voronezh Oblast, Russia. The population was 96 as of 2010. There are 6 streets.

== Geography ==
Sennoye is located on the right bank of the Voronezh River, 26 km north of Ramon (the district's administrative centre) by road. Sindyakino is the nearest rural locality.
