= Sennoy, Volgograd Oblast =

Sennoy Сенной
- Khutor
- Location within Volgograd Oblast Location within Russia
- Coordinates: 50°15′N 43°36′E
- Country: Russia
- Region: Volgograd Oblast
- District: Mikhaylovka Urban Okrug
- Time zone: UTC+4:00

Sennoy (Russian: Сенной) is a rural locality (a khutor) in Mikhaylovka Urban Okrug, Volgograd Oblast, Russia. The population was 1,022 as of 2010. There are 14 streets.

== Geography ==
Sennoy is located 40 km northeast of Mikhaylovka. Bolshaya Glushitsa is the nearest rural locality.
