= Aghushk Khoshk Kari =

Aghushk Khoshk Kari اغوشك خشك كارئ
- Village
- Location within Iran
- Coordinates: 26°08′32″N 57°21′47″E
- Country: Iran
- Province: Hormozgan
- County: Jask
- Bakhsh: Central
- Rural District: Kangan

Population (2006)
  - Total: 147
- Time zone: UTC+3:30 (IRST)
  - Summer (DST): UTC+4:30 (IRDT)

Aghushk Khoshk Kari (Persian: اغوشك خشك كارئ, also Romanized as Aghūshk Khoshk Kārī; also known as Khoshk Kārī, Pāzar, and Pāzard) is a village in Kangan Rural District, in the Central District of Jask County, Hormozgan Province, Iran. At the 2006 census, its population was 147, in 24 families.
