= Kazbek (given name) =

Kazbek (Russian: Казбек) is a male given name, after Mount Kazbek, Caucasus.

Notable people with this name include:

- Kazbek Akbaev (born 1981), Russian chess player
- Kazbek Gekkiyev (1984–2012), Russian news presenter and journalist
- Kazbek Geteriev (born 1985), Kazakhstani footballer
- Kazbek Hudalov, Soviet soldier
- Kazbek Kokov (born 1973), Russian politician
- Kazbek Pagiyev (1959–2008), Russian politician
- Kazbek Paranuk, Russian politician
- Kazbek Tambi (born 1961), American footballer
- Kazbek Taysaev (born 1967), Russian politician
- Kazbek Tuaev (born 1940), Azerbaijani footballer and manager
- Kazbek Zankishiev (1992–2024), Russian judoka
