= Kazbek (disambiguation) =

Kazbek is a mountain in Caucasus.

Kazbek may also refer to:

- Kazbek (cigarettes)
- Kazbek (film)
- Kazbek (given name)
