= Myat-Loam =

Mountain in Ingushetia, Russia

- Table Mountain
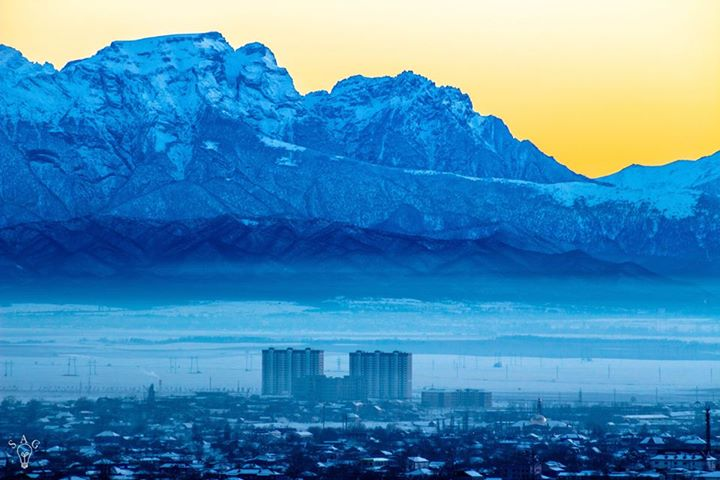

Highest point
- Elevation: 3,003 m (9,852 ft)
- Coordinates: 42°51′57″N 44°42′00″E

Naming
- Native name: Маьт-Лоам

Geography
- Country: Russia
- State: Ingushetia
- Parent range: Skalisty Range, Caucasus

Myat-Loam (Ingush: Маьт-Лоам, Russian: Столовая гора, Stolovaya gora) is a mountain in the North Caucasus of Russia, in the Dzheyrakhsky District of the Republic of Ingushetia, bordering the Prigorodny District of North Ossetia–Alania. The mountain has a broad, relatively flat summit and an elevation of about 3,000 m (9,843 ft).

The mountain is a prominent landmark of the central North Caucasus and is visible from the surrounding lowlands, including Magas, the capital of Ingushetia, and Vladikavkaz, the capital of North Ossetia–Alania.

== Geography ==
Myat-Loam forms part of the Skalisty Range of the Greater Caucasus. The mountain's characteristic flat-topped profile is the origin of its Russian name Stolovaya, meaning "table-shaped". Sources give slightly different elevations for the summit. The Russian Ministry of Emergency Situations gives 3,003 m (9,852 ft), while map-based sources give approximately 2,994 m (9,823 ft).

The mountain is situated near the village of Beyni in the Dzheyrakhsky District. A hiking route to the summit passes through the historic sanctuary of Myat-Seli.

== Nomenclature ==
The Ingush name of the mountain is Myat-Loam, meaning "Table Mountain". The name is recorded in scholarly literature on the traditional Ingush calendar, which notes that the mountain was used as a high observation point for observing sunrise and sunset.

== Cultural significance ==
The mountain has cultural significance in Ingushetia and is represented on the coat of arms of the Republic of Ingushetia.

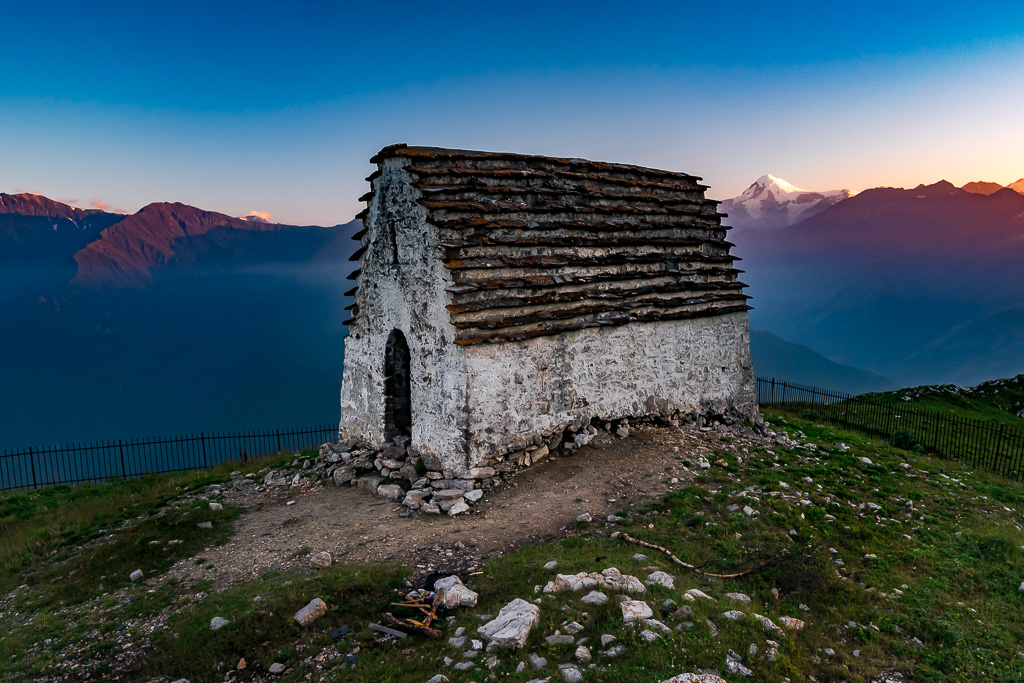
Myat-Seli sanctuary

Myat-Loam was regarded as a sacred mountain by the Ingush in ancient times, and served as a setting for communal ritual observances associated with the historic Myat-Seli sanctuary on its slopes. According to traditional accounts, communal prayers for rain were performed during periods of drought at rural and patrimonial sanctuaries. The ritual associated with Myat-Seli took place at the sanctuary on the plateau of Myat-Loam and was traditionally conducted on Wednesdays. Participants from neighboring villages formed a procession led by a priest and ascended the mountain to the sanctuary. A sacrificial bull accompanied the procession, its horns reportedly wrapped in white material. Upon reaching the sanctuary, the animal was positioned facing east, after which the chief priest recited a prayer invoking rain and a plentiful harvest.

== Gallery ==
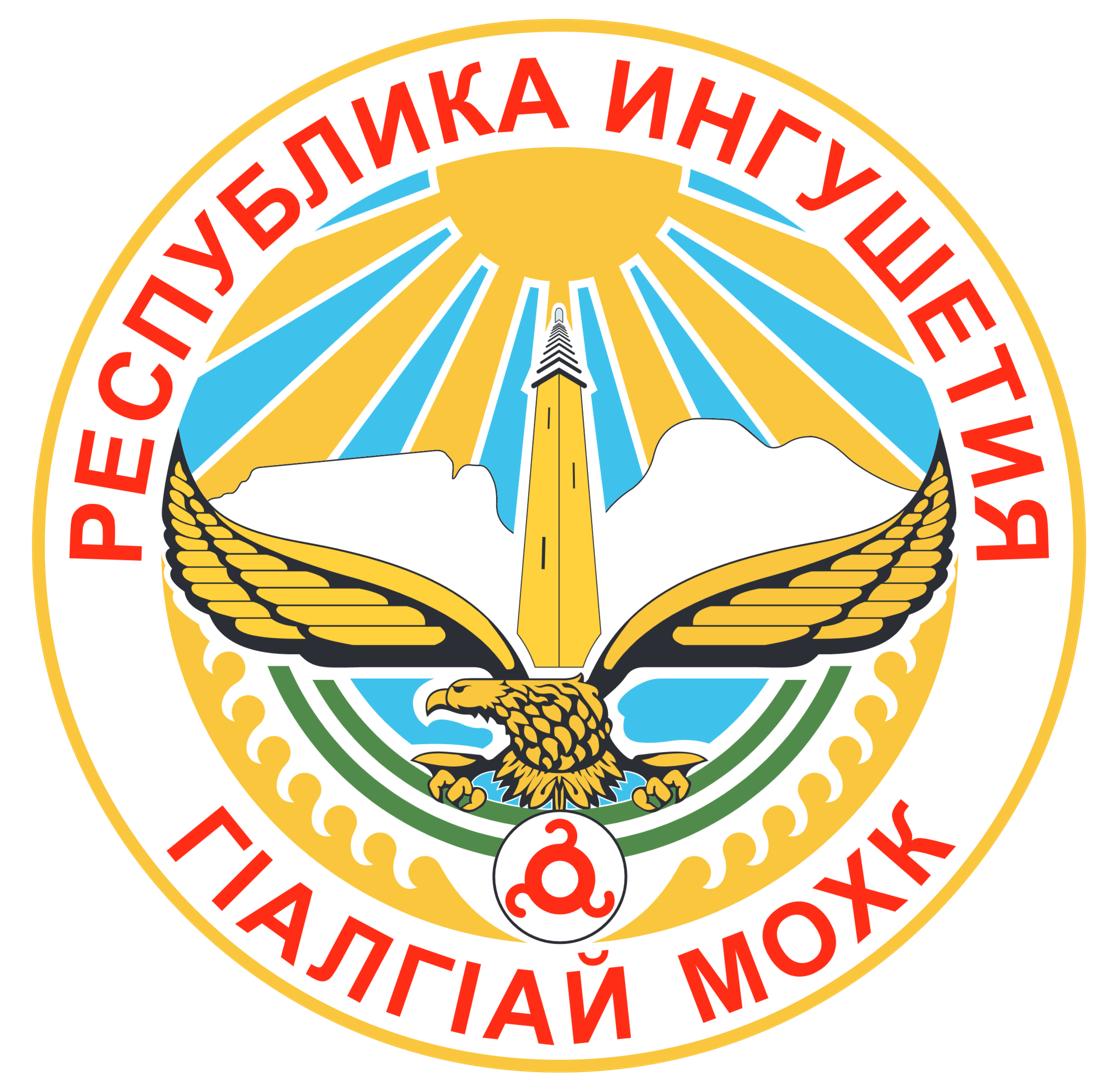
Myat-Loam on the coat of arms of Ingushetia

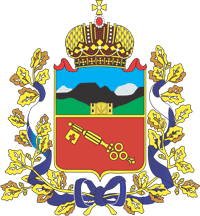
Myat-Loam on the coat of arms of Vladikavkaz

View of Ingush village Zaur and Myat-Loam in 1782, by M. Ivanov

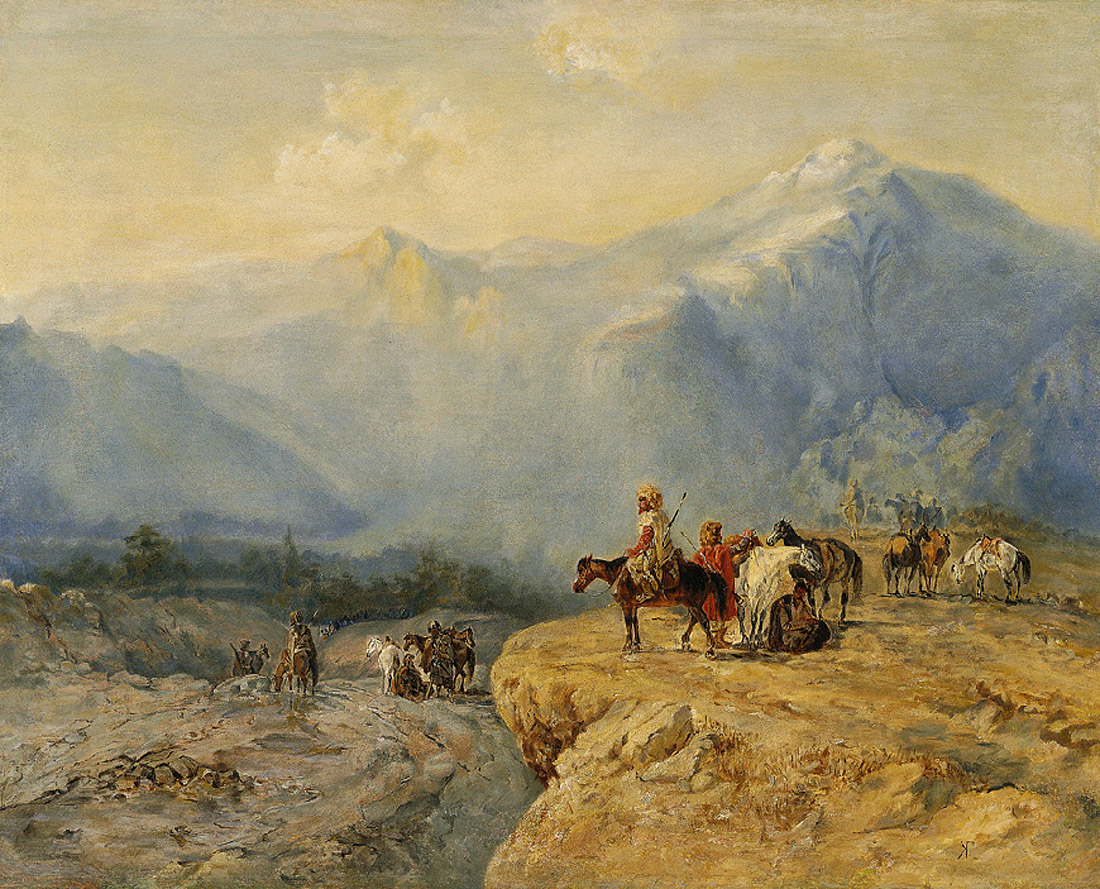
View of Kazbek from Myat-Loam (Table Mountain), mid-19th century, by G. Gagarin

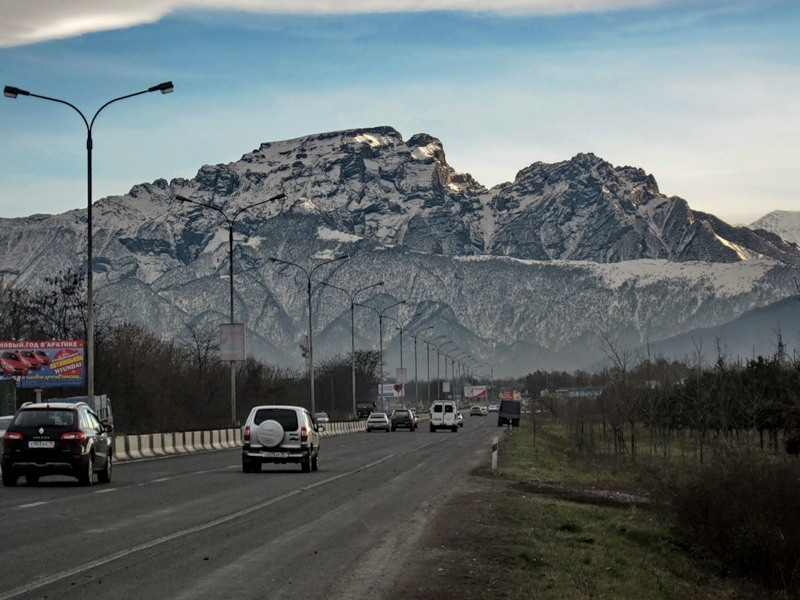
View from Vladikavkaz in November 2009

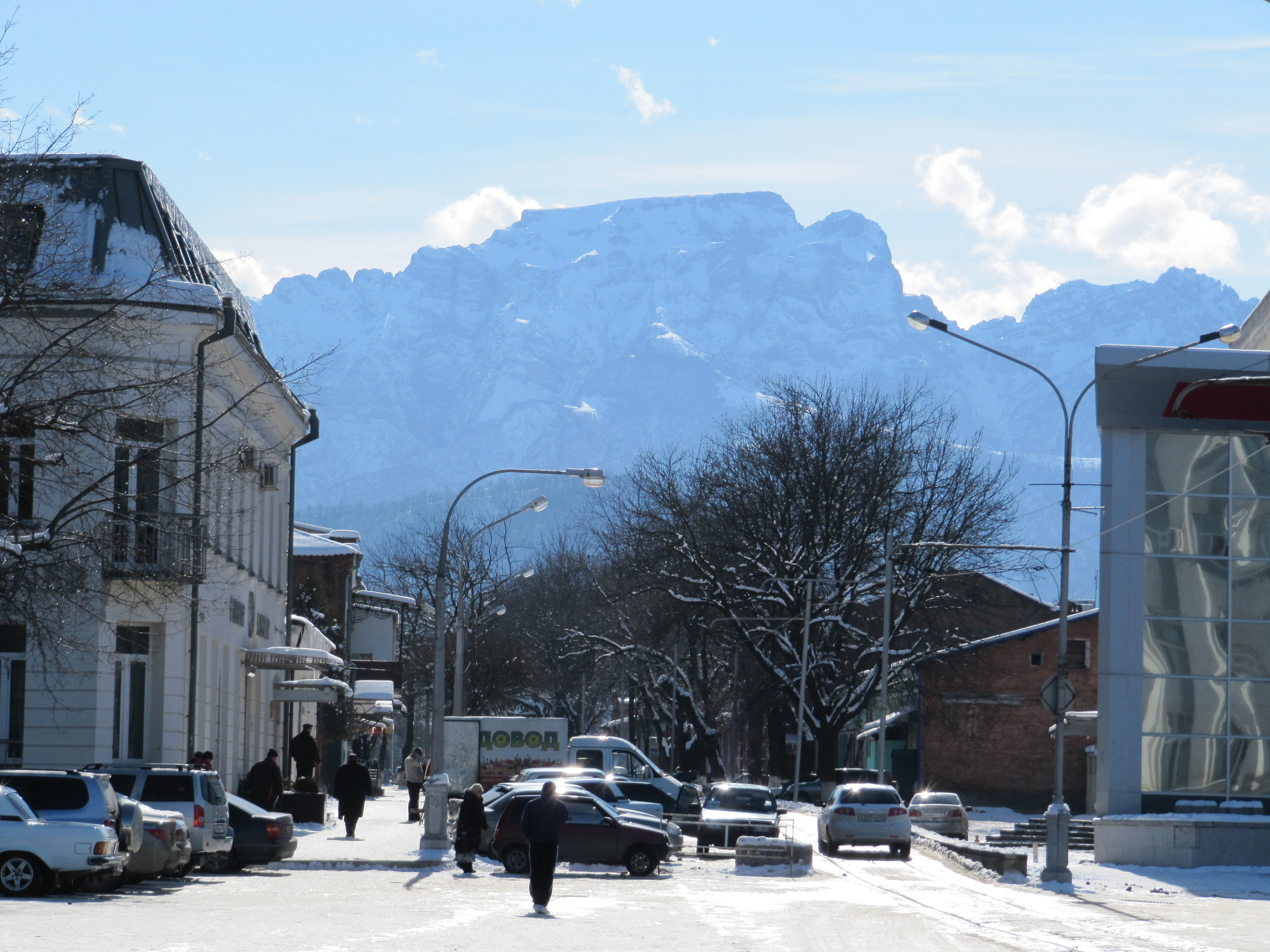
View from Vladikavkaz in February 2010
