= Zaur (village) =

Historical place (village)

Zaur or Zaurovo (Note: Ingush: Зовр-Ков, romanized: Zovr-Kov; Russian: Заур, Заурово) was an Ingush village that existed in the 18th–19th centuries on the right bank of the Terek River and in the Tarskoye Valley.

According to most sources, the fortress Vladikavkaz was founded on its territory in 1784, while according to other sources, Vladikavkaz was built near Zaur.

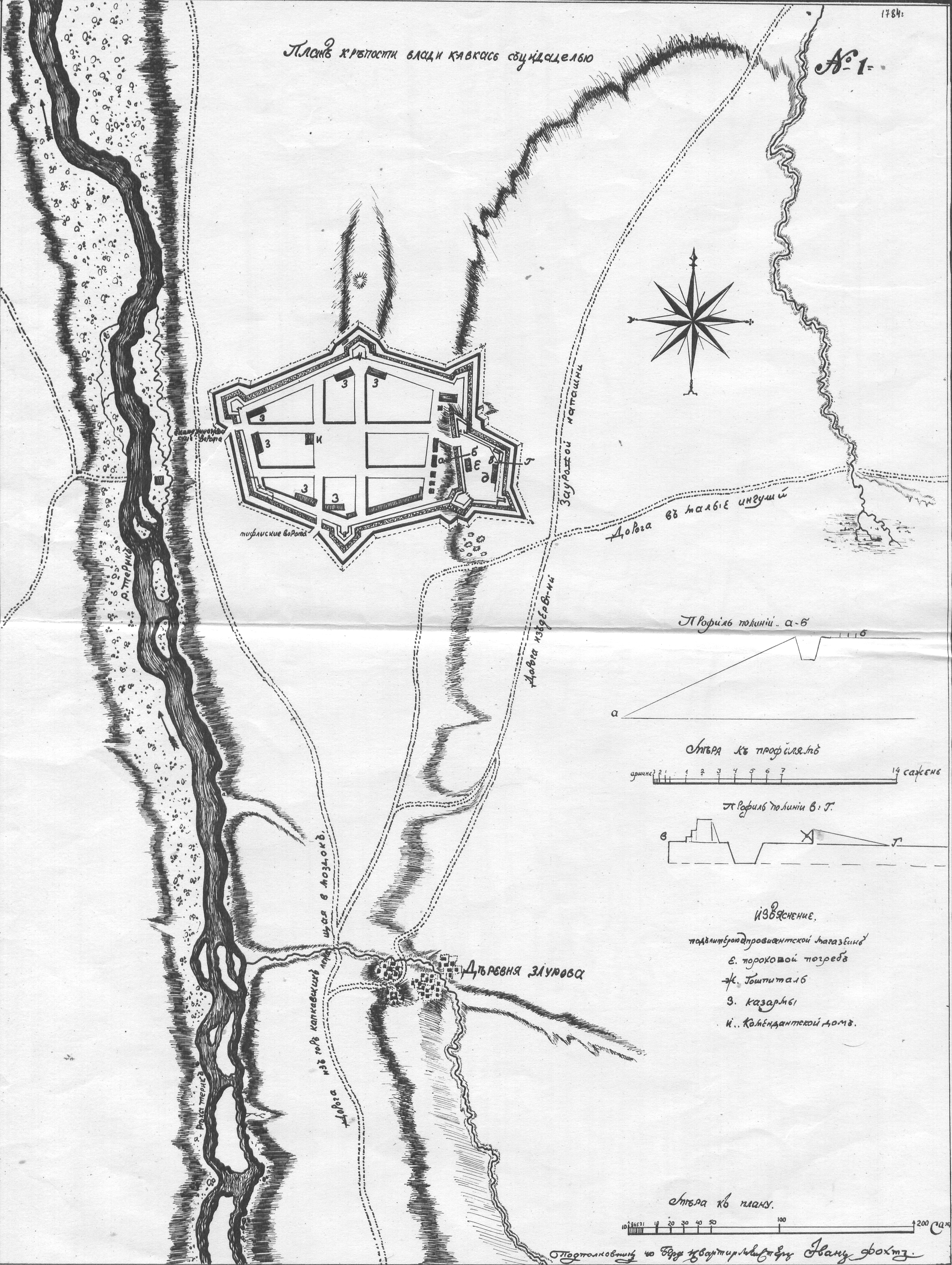
The Ingush village Zaurovo and the fortress Vladikavkaz on Johann Vogt's map (1784).

== Etymology ==
The Ingush name of the village, Zovr-Kov, translates as "the yard/settlement of Zaur". According to Russian historian Pyotr Butkov, the village was known by the Armenians as Zura (Armenian: Զւրա), by the Byzantines as Tzur (Greek: Τζυρ), by Arab writers as Suariag and Saul.

Orthography of the name
Name	Author	Source	Date
Zaur/Zaur-kabak	Johann Güldenstädt		1770s
Zaurov	L. Shteder		1781
Saukqua/Ssaurowa	Julius Klaproth		1807

== History ==
=== Foundation ===
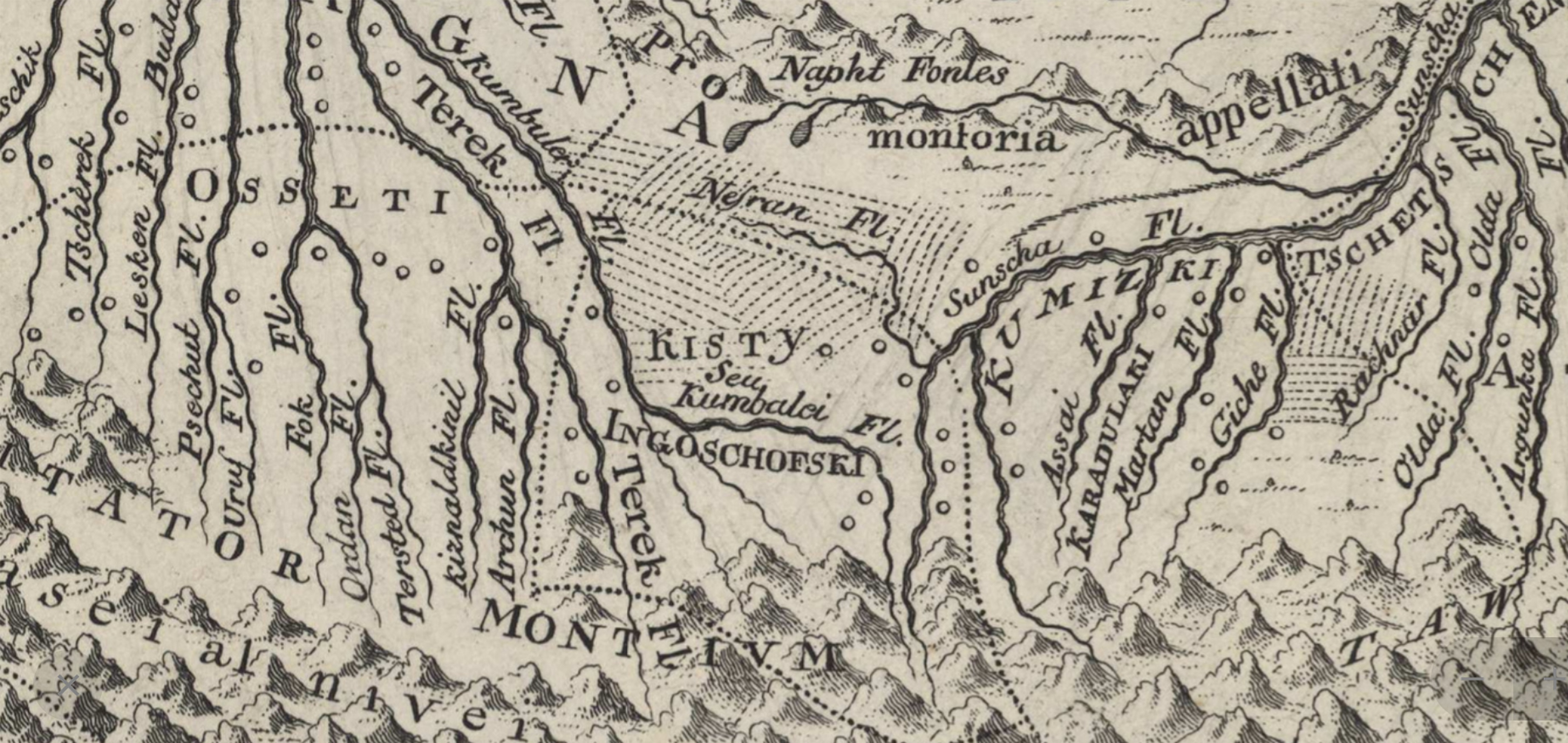
Kisty-Ingoschofski (Ingush) on Jacob von Staehlin's map in 1771, over a decade prior to the establishment of the fortress Vladikavkaz on the right bank of the Terek river.

Based on the analysis of maps of the 19th century, historian and caucasologist Nataliya Volkova concluded that the village was founded in the period of the 1730s to 1760s, the same time that Ingush migrations to the right bank of Terek River occurred.

Reportedly, the village was built by Zaur, a representative from either the Malsagov branch of the Thargimkhoy clan (teip) or the Dolgiyev branch of the Thumkhoy clan.

The village was an important center of the Ingush and served as one of the meeting places for the Mekhk-Qel (lit. 'Country's court').

=== Later history ===
Earliest visual depiction of Zaur and Myat-Loam in 1782, by M. Ivanov

According to a report by General Johann Friedrich von Medem dated 2 September 1773, the position of Zaur had important military-strategic significance due to its ability to control the surrounding territory, mountain routes, and lines of communication:

After crossing [the river], one can proceed in many columns directly from the Ingush village of Zaurovo ... The camp at Zaurovo is very advantageous in terms of grass, firewood, and water; at this place it is necessary to maintain a permanent fortified post, as it prevents entry into and exit from the mountains, provides a view for 50 versts and of the smallest objects in the field, and secures passing detachments in both directions with communication posts for numerous military reserves.

The Russian authorities felt the need to establish reliable communication routes with the territory of Georgia. Hence why, in May 1784, 4 versts away from the village of Zaur, the Vladikavkaz Fortress was founded. At that time, there were 30 households in the village.

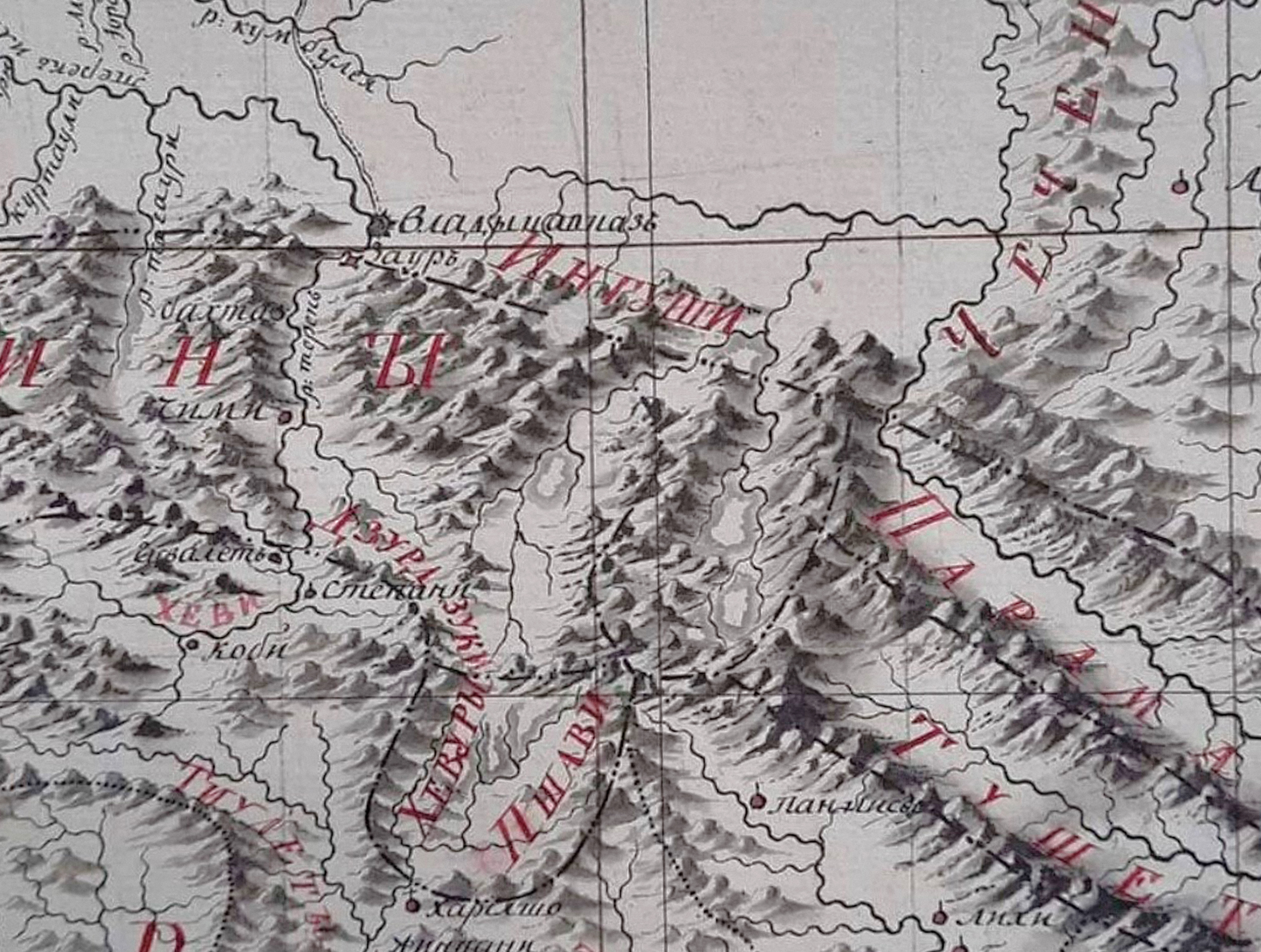
Burnashev's map (1784) illustrates the Ingush village Zaur (Заур) just below the newly built fortress Vladikavkaz.

The Ingush, who had their villages often attacked by Kabardian and Kumyk well-armed and numerous squads, needed the help of the Vladikavkaz's Garrison troops. At the first call for help, the Ingush also appeared under the walls of the fortress. Getta, the foreman of Zaur, was among the Ingush as attested by the Vladikavkaz's commandant's reports and other documents. Getta owned the single Ingush tower of the village.

Outside the fortress walls, in its immediate vicinity, were the auls of Toti, Temurki, and other Ingush settlements, whose inhabitants were subsequently relocated to the mountainous regions. Soon after the fortress was constructed, Ossetians descending from the mountains began settling in the surrounding area. They were later joined by Cossacks, whose settlement, like that of the Ossetians, took place under military protection. At the same time, the Ingush population was gradually displaced from the neighboring auls. The auls of Zaurovo and Toti eventually ceased to exist, while Temurkovo remained inhabited until the mid-19th century.

== Modern localization ==
Johann Güldenstedt notes that Zaur is located opposite the low Ossetian mountains. Butkov mentions that Zaur is located approximately 6 km from Vladikavkaz.

== Bibliography ==
=== Russian sources ===
- Akhmadov, Ya. Z. (2009). Очерк исторической географии и этнополитического развития Чечни в XVI-XVIII веках [Essay on the historical geography and ethnopolitical development of Chechnya in the 16th-18th centuries] (in Russian). Grozny: Blagotvoritelny fobd chechenskoy literatury. pp. 1–422. ISBN 978-5-91821-013-0.
- Chibirov, L. A. (1989). Периодическая печать Кавказа об Осетии и осетинах [The Caucasus Periodical Press on Ossetia and the Ossetians]. Vol. 4. Tskhinvali: Ирыстон.
- "Будет-ли обойденъ Владикавказъ?" [Will Vladikavkaz be bypassed?]. Кавказъ (in Russian). No. 137. Тифлисъ. 16 June 1912.
- Благовѣщенскій, Н., ed. (1878). Сборникъ свѣдѣній о Терской области: Вып. 1 [Collection of information about the Terek region] (in Russian). Владикавказъ: Тип. Терскаго Областнаго Правленія. pp. 1–381, I–V.
- Блиев, М. М. (1984). Русско-осетинские отношения в XVIII веке: сборник документов [Russian-Ossetian relations in the 18th century: collection of documents] (in Russian). Vol. 2: 1764–1784 гг. Орджоникидзе: Ир. pp. 1–456.
- Броневскій, С. М. (1823). "Кисты (глава третья)" [Kists (chapter three)]. Новѣйшія географическія и историческія извѣстія о Кавказѣ (часть вторая) [The latest geographical and historical news about the Caucasus (part two)] (PDF) (in Russian). Москва: Типографія С. Селивановскаго. pp. 151–186.
- Бутков, П. Г. (1837). "Мнѣніе о книгѣ: Славянскія древности" [Opinion about the book: Slavic antiquities]. Три древніе договора руссовъ съ норвежцами и шведами [Three ancient treaties of the Russians with the Norwegians and the Swedes] (in Russian). Санкт-Петербург: Типографія Министерства внутреннихъ дѣлъ. pp. 1–66 (311–378 as PDF).
- Бутков, П. Г. (1869). Матеріалы для новой истории, съ 1722 по 1803 годъ [Materials for the new history of the Caucasus, from 1722 to 1803] (in Russian). Vol. 2. СПб.: Типографія Императорской Академіи Наукъ. pp. 1–602.
- Dolgieva, M. B.; Kartoev, M. M.; Kodzoev, N. D.; Matiev, T. Kh. (2013). Kodzoev, N. D.; et al. (eds.). История Ингушетии [History of Ingushetia] (4th ed.). Rostov-Na-Donu: Yuzhnyy izdatelsky dom. pp. 1–600. ISBN 978-5-98864-056-1.
- Volkova, N. G. (1974). Gardanov, V. K. (ed.). Этнический состав населения Северного Кавказа в XVIII — начале XX века [Ethnic composition of the population of the North Caucasus in the 18th - early 20th centuries] (in Russian). Mosvka: Nauka. pp. 1–276.
- Gazikov, B. D.; Kodzoev, N. D.; Tangiev, A. U. (2002). Материалы по истории Владикавказа [Materials on the History of Vladikavkaz] (3 ed.). Nazran.
- Gazikov, B. D. (2002). "Трагические вехи в истории ингушского народа" [Tragic Milestones in the History of the Ingush People]. Взгляд в прошлое: статьи по истории Ингушетии [A Look into the Past: Articles on the History of Ingushetia]. Nazran: Северо-Кавказский государственный институт.
- Гюльденштедт, И. А. (2002). Карпов, Ю. Ю. (ed.). Путешествие по Кавказу в 1770–1773 гг. [Journey through the Caucasus in 1770–1773.] (in Russian). Translated by Шафроновской, Т. К. Санкт-Петербург: Петербургское Востоковедение. pp. 1–508. ISBN 5-85803-213-3.
- Долгиева, М. Б.; Картоев, М. М.; Кодзоев, Н. Д.; Матиев, Т. Х. (2013). Кодзоев, Н. Д. (ed.). История Ингушетии [History of Ingushetia] (4nd ed.). Ростов-на-Дону: Южный издательский дом. pp. 1–600. ISBN 978-5-98864-056-1.
- Genko, A. N. (1930). "Из культурного прошлого ингушей" [From the cultural past of the Ingush] (PDF). Записки коллегии востоковедов при Азиатском музее [Notes of the College of Orientalists at the Asian Museum] (PDF) (in Russian). Vol. 5. Leningrad: Izd-vo Akademii nauk SSSR. pp. 681–761.
- Ильин, Л. (1928). Пожидаева, В. П. (ed.). Военно-Грузинская, Военно-осетинская дороги, Ингушетия, Северная Осетия: Путеводитель-Справочник [Military-Georgian, Military-Ossetian roads, Ingushetia, North Ossetia: Guide-Handbook] (in Russian). Владикавказ: Типо-Фото-Цинкография из-ва „Раетдзинад“. pp. 1–93.
- Klaproth, Heinrich Julius (1814). Travels in the Caucasus and Georgia: Performed in the Years 1807 and 1808, by Command of the Russian Government. Translated by Shoberl, Frederic. London: Henry Colburn. pp. 1–421.
- Karpov, Yu. Yu. (1990). "К проблеме ингушской автономии" [On the problem of Ingush autonomy]. Sovetskaya etnografia (in Russian) (5). Moskva: Nauka: 29–33.
- Kostoev, B. U. (1989-09-09). Kostoev, B. U. (ed.). О социально-политическом положении ингушского народа : доклад Костоева Беслана Усмановича [On the socio-political situation of the Ingush people: report by Beslan Usmanovich Kostoev]. Второй съезд ингушского народа (in Russian). Grozny: Kniga. pp. 9–39. ISBN 5-7666-0396-7(Material of the conference compiled by Beslan Kostoev & Magomed-Rashid Pliev)
- Крупнов, Е. И. (1971). Средневековая Ингушетия [Medieval Ingushetia] (in Russian). Москва: Наука. pp. 1–211.
- Некрич, А. М. (1978). Наказанные народы [Punished peoples] (in Russian). Нью-Йорк: Хроника. pp. 1–170.
- Поспелов, Е. М. (2008). Географические названия России. Топонимический словарь [Geographical names of Russia. Toponymic Dictionary] (in Russian). Москва: АСТ, Астрель. pp. 1–523. ISBN 978-5-17-054966-5.
- Раисов, И. (1897). Новѣйшій иллюстрированный путеводитель по Крыму и Кавказу на 1897/8 г. [The latest illustrated guide to the Crimea and the Caucasus for 1897/8] (in Russian) (Р. Рашковекой и А. Евгеньева ed.). Одесса: Типографія Исаковичъ и Бейленсонъ.
- Ракович, Д. В. (1911). Прошлое Владикавказа. Краткая историческая справка ко дню пятидесятилетнего юбилея города. 1861 г. [The past of Vladikavkaz. Brief historical background to the fiftieth anniversary of the city. 1861] (in Russian) (3rd ed.). Владикавказ: Электропеч. Р. Сегаль и С-вья. pp. 1–28.
- Союз горцев Кавказа в ЧСР (1924). "О Галгаях" [About the Galgai]. Кавказский горец [Caucasian highlander] (in Russian) (1). Прага: Издание Союза горцев Кавказа в ЧСР: 3–79.
- Терскій областной статистическій комитет (1895). Вертепов, Г. А. (ed.). Терскій календарь. Вып. 5 [Tersky Calendar] (in Russian). Владикавказъ: Типографія Терскаго областнаго правленія. pp. 1–426.
- "Владикавказъ" [Vladikavkaz]. Терскія вѣдомости (in Russian). No. 71. Владикавказъ. 31 March 1911.
- "Торжество празднованія 50-летия основанія г. Владикавказа" [The celebration of the 50th anniversary of the founding of the city of Vladikavkaz]. Терскія вѣдомости (in Russian). No. 75. Владикавказъ. 5 April 1911.
- Tsutsiev, A. A. (1998). Осетино-ингушский конфликт (1992—...): его предыстория и факторы развития. Историко-социологический очерк [Ossetian-Ingush conflict (1992–...): its background and development factors. Historical and sociological essay] (in Russian). Moskva: ROSSPEN. pp. 1–200. ISBN 5-86004-178-0.
- Штедер (2010) [1781]. "Дневник путешествия в 1781 году от пограничной крепости Моздок во внутренние области Кавказа" [Diary of a journey in 1781 from the border fortress of Mozdok to the interior regions of the Caucasus]. Кавказ: Европейские дневники XIII—XVIII веков [Caucasus: European Diaries of the 13th-18th Centuries] (in Russian). Translated by Аталиков, В. Нальчик: Изд-во М. и В. Котляровых. pp. 155–171.
