= Vladikavkaz railway station =

Railway station in Russia

Vladikavkaz Владикавказ
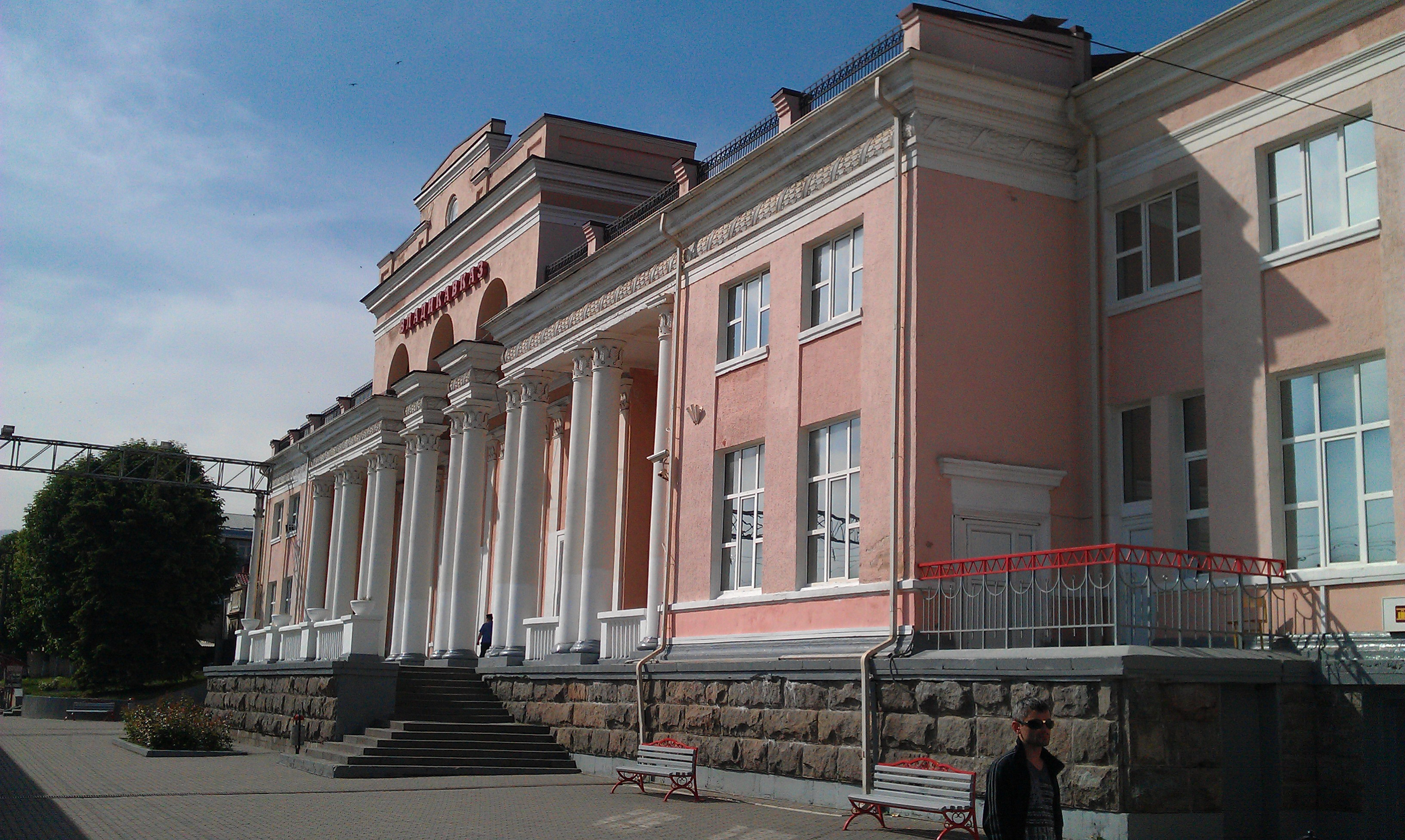
- View of the station from the platform 1

General information
- Location: Vladikavkaz, Russia
- Coordinates: 43.0378°N 44.6881°E
- System: North Caucasus Railway terminal
- Owner: Russian Railways
- Platforms: 2 (1 island platform)
- Tracks: 4

Construction
- Parking: yes

Other information
- Station code: 538708
- Fare zone: 22

History
- Opened: 1875

Services
Preceding station	North Caucasus Railway	Following station
Location

Vladikavkaz (Russian: Владикавказ, Iron Ossetic: Дзæуджыхъæу) is a railway station in Vladikavkaz, the capital of North Ossetia in Russia. The terminus station on the Beslan – Vladikavkaz line (Vladikavkaz Railway).

== History ==
A railway between Vladikavkaz and Moscow exists since summer 1875.

First brick in building of the Vladikavkaz station was laid in 1875. In the first half of the 1960s the railway station and the adjacent territory were renovated. In the second half of the 2000s, the station was renovated and equipped with new equipment.

== Trains ==
- Vladikavkaz – Mineralnye Vody
- Vladikavkaz – Moscow
- Vladikavkaz – St.Petersburg
- Vladikavkaz – Novorossiysk
- Vladikavkaz – Adler
- Vladikavkaz – Anapa
