= Vitaly Karayev =

Russian politician (1962–2008)

- Born: Виталий Сергеевич Караев; 10 June 1962; Chermen, Prigorodny District, North Ossetia, Russian SFSR, Soviet Union
- Died: 26 November 2008 (aged 46); Vladikavkaz, Republic of North Ossetia–Alania, Russia
- Cause of death: Gunshot
- Education: North Ossetian State University
- Occupation: Mayor of Vladikavkaz
- Term: February 2008 – 26 November 2008

Vitaly Sergeyevich Karayev (Russian: Виталий Сергеевич Караев) (10 June 1962 – 26 November 2008) was the mayor of the North Ossetian capital, Vladikavkaz.

== Assassination ==
Karayev was murdered by an unknown gunman on 26 November 2008. He was killed as he left his home and climbed into his silver Mercedes. He was taken to hospital, but died there from a chest wound. He had been in power for less than a year before being murdered.

Russian authorities stated in February 2009 that about 30 people had been detained in connection with Karayev's assassination, including some in Moscow. Another source said Karayev's killing was also linked to the death a month later of ex-Vladikavkaz mayor Kazbek Pagiyev.

Karayev's killer, Alexander Jussoyev, was sentenced to 20 years in prison on 11 August 2011. Jussoyev was said to be a member of an organized crime group led by Aslan Gagiyev.
