= Vladikavkaz =

Vladikavkaz Владикавказ
- City

Other transcription(s)
  - Ossetian: Дзӕуджыхъæу/Дзӕуӕгигъӕу
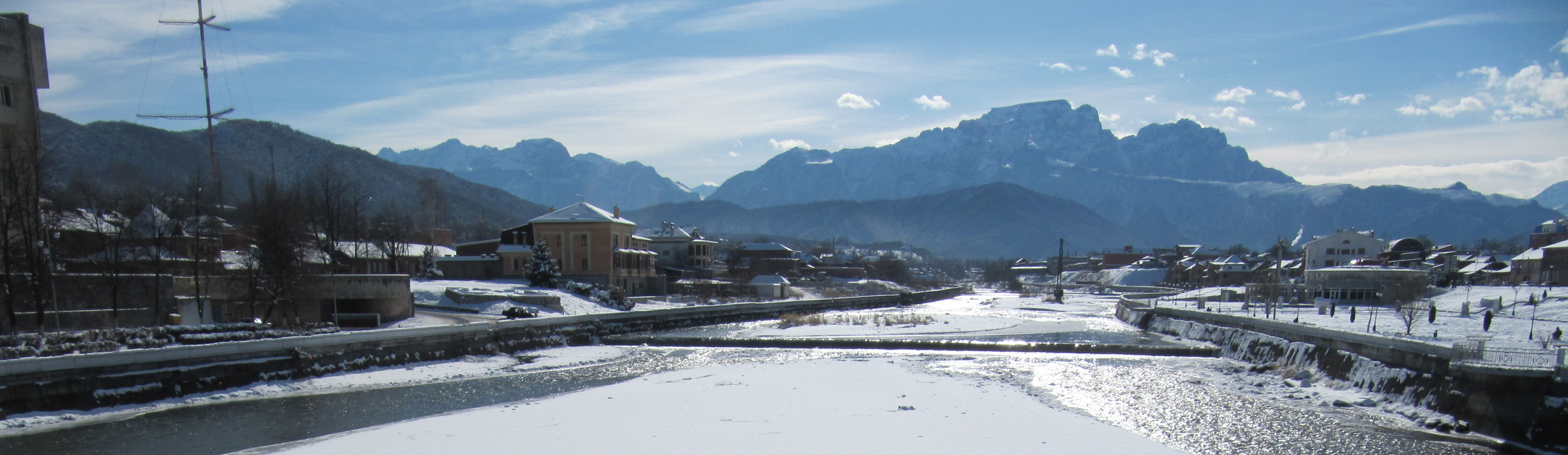
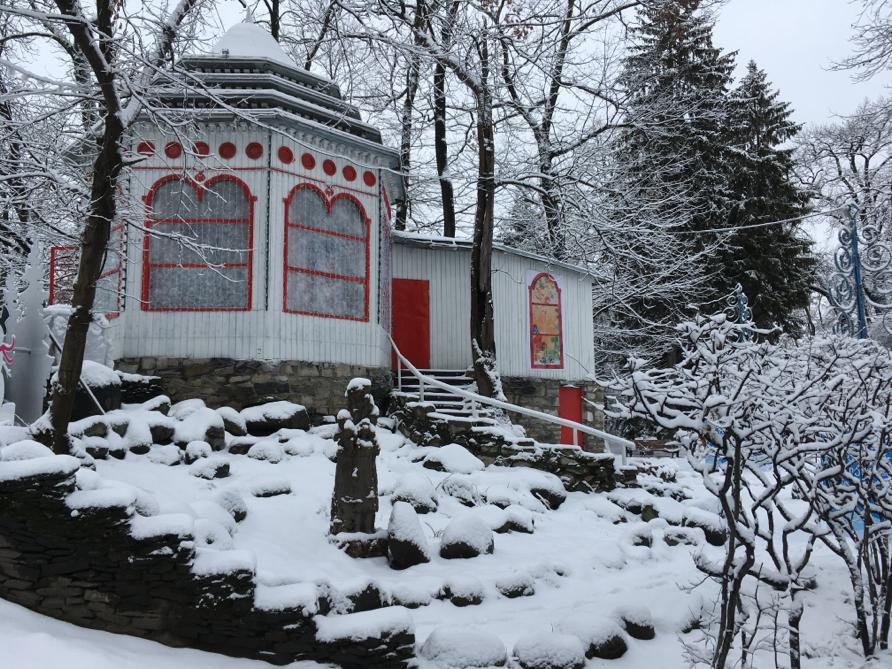
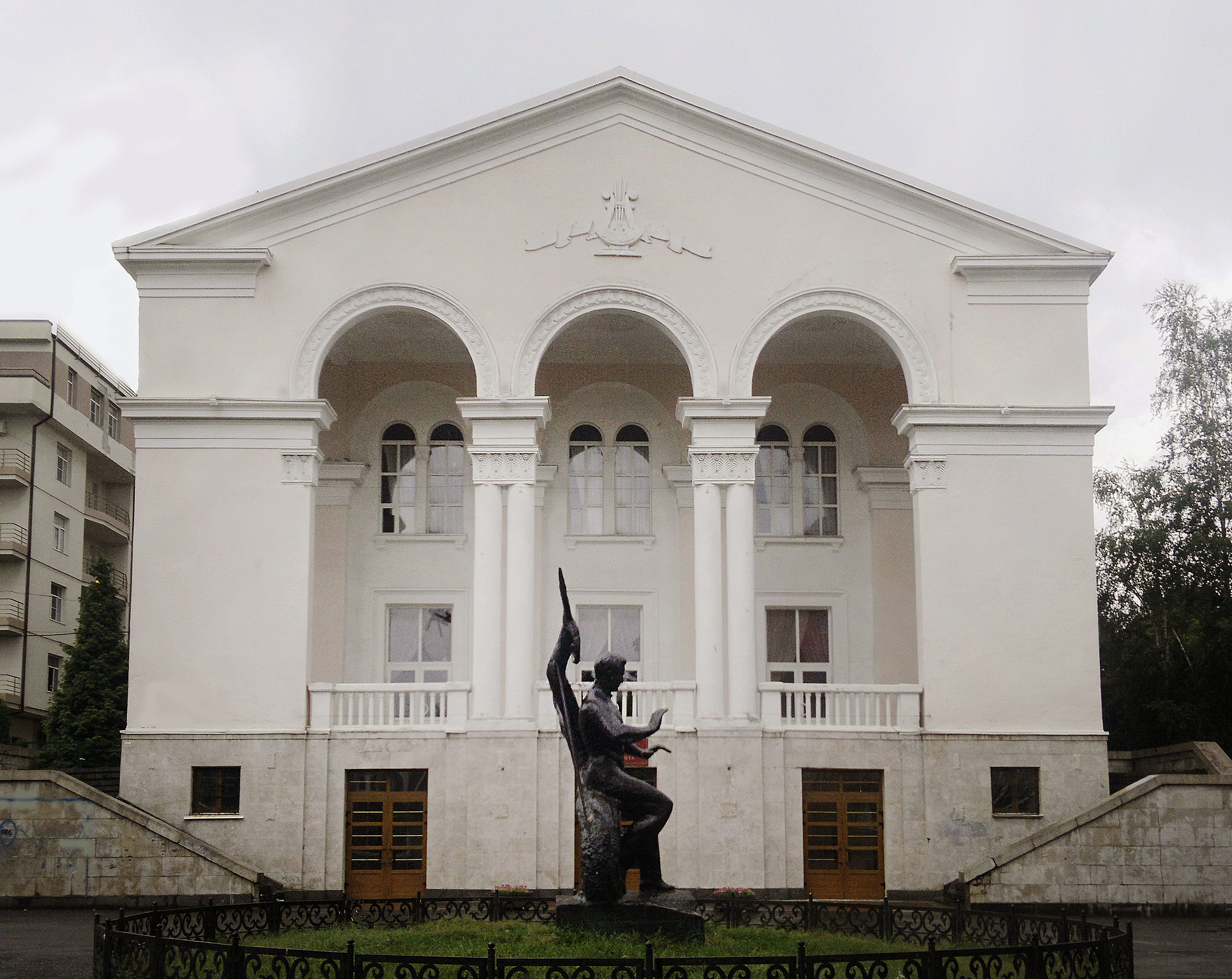
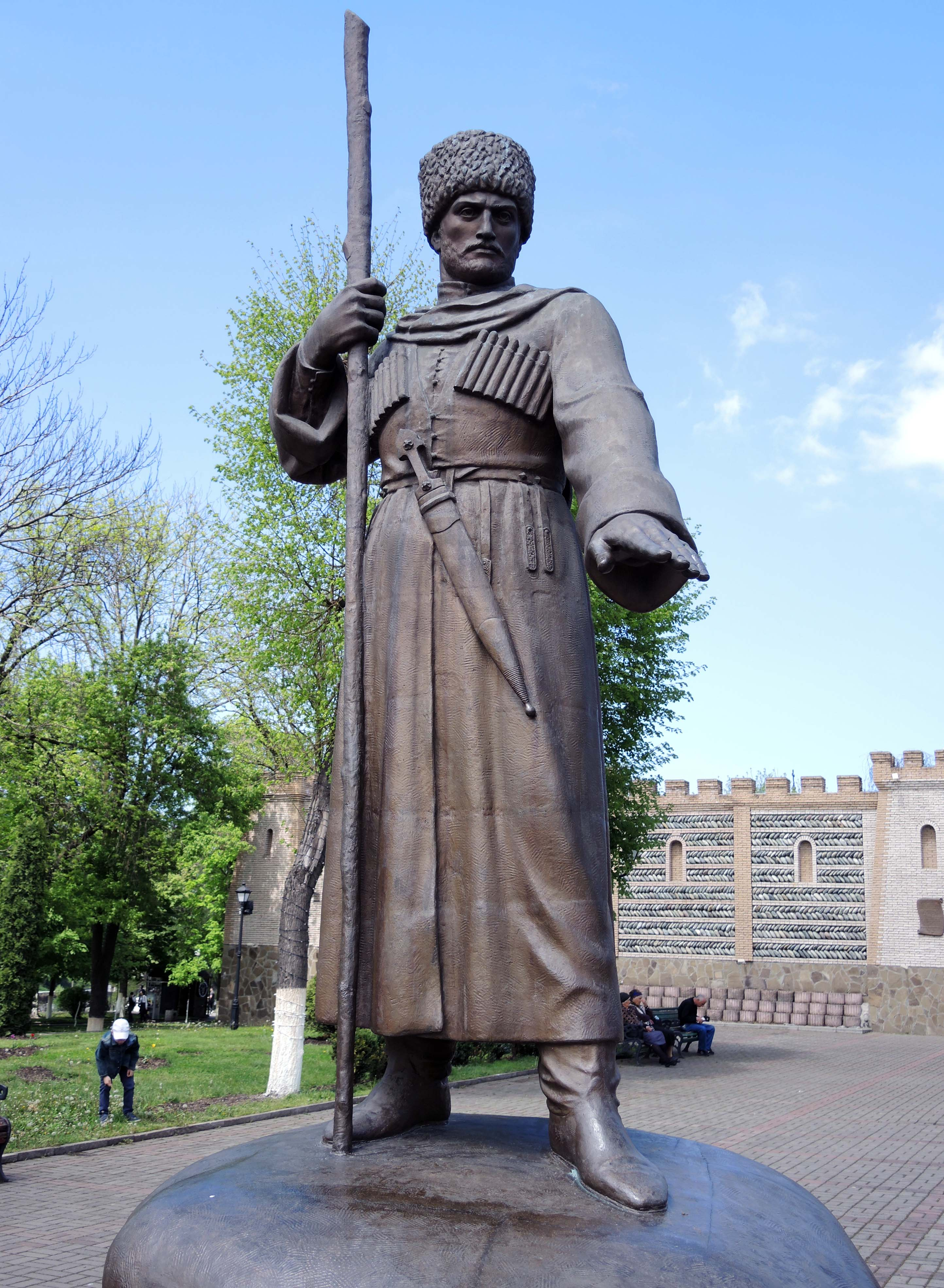
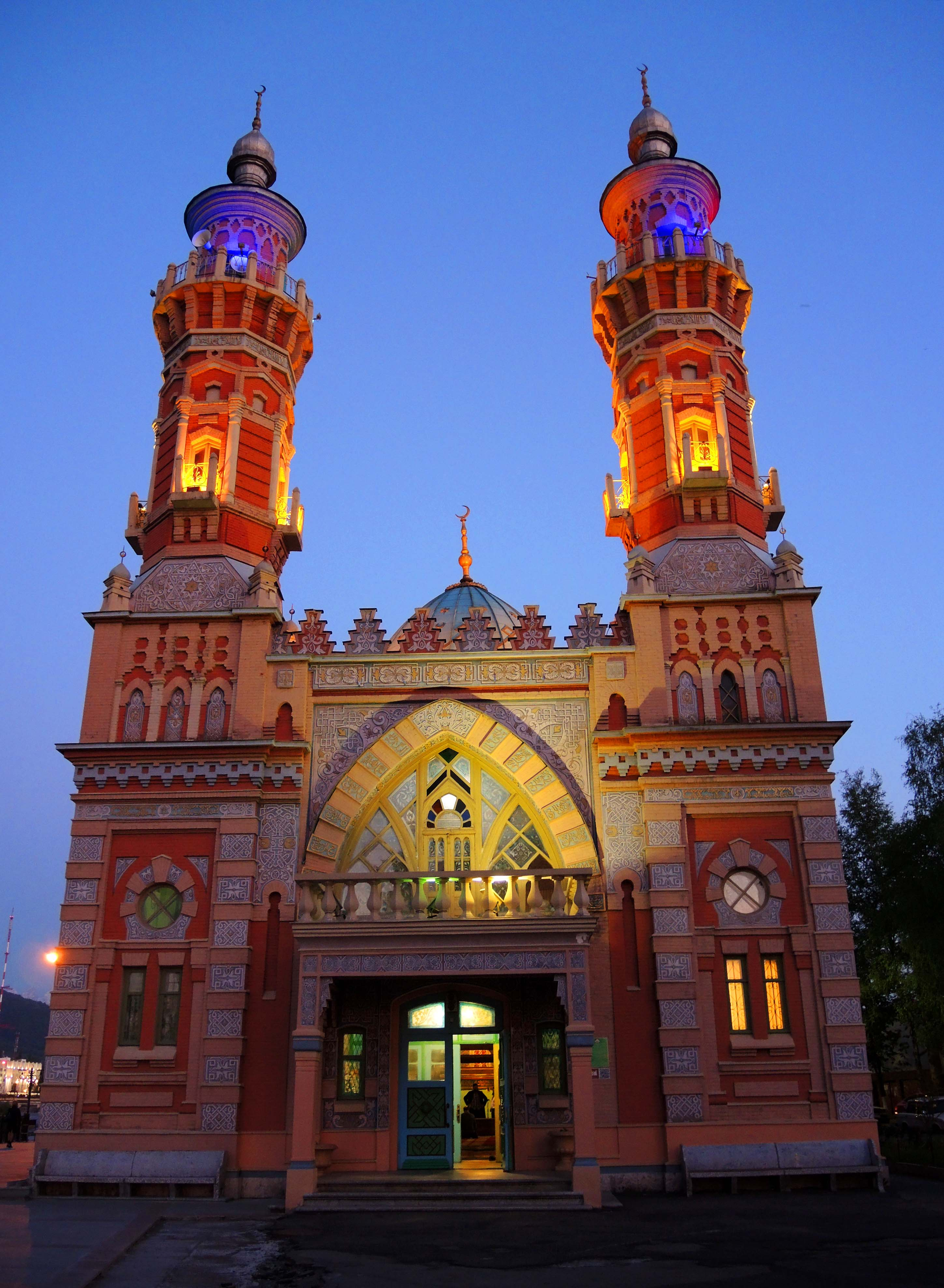
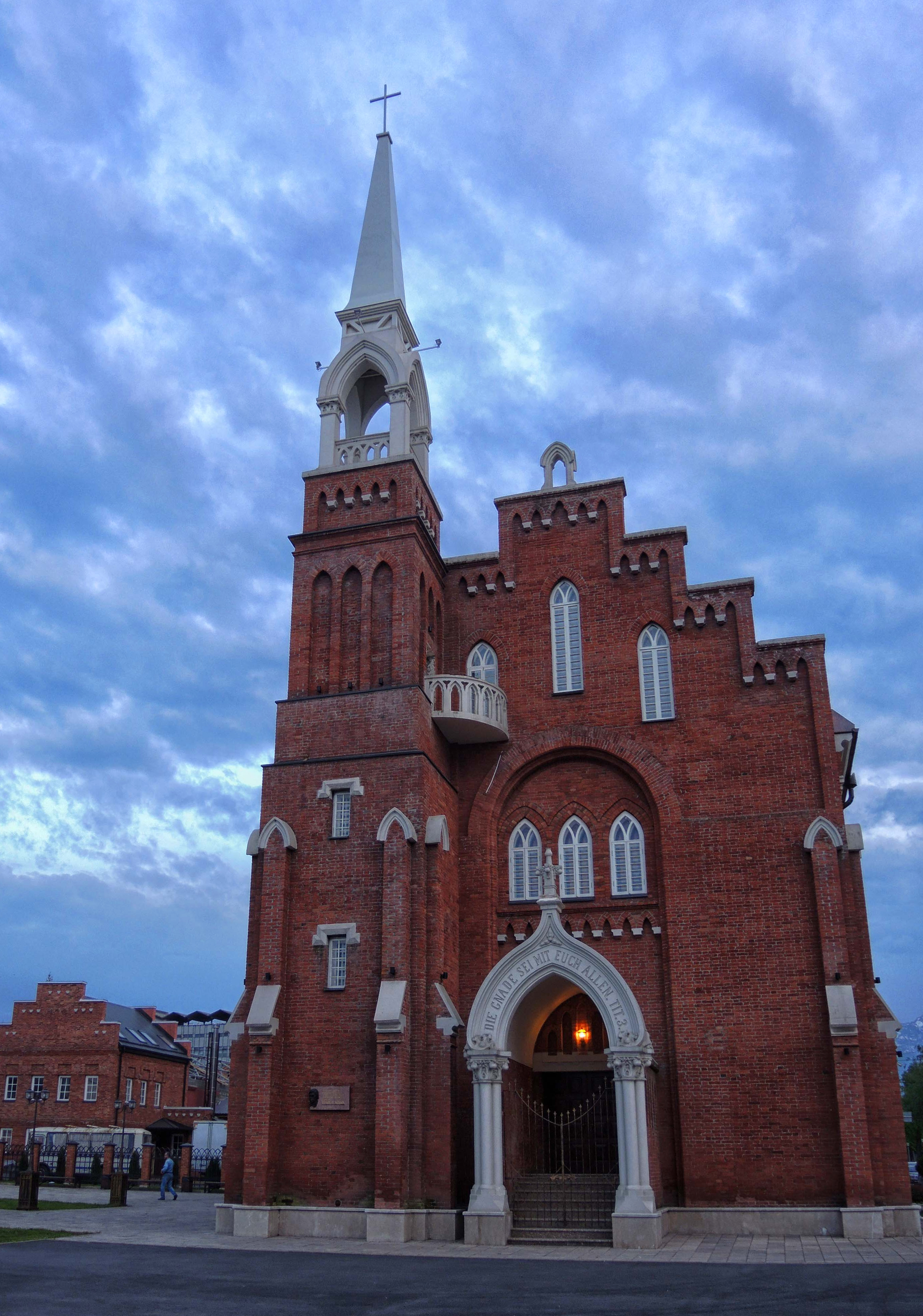
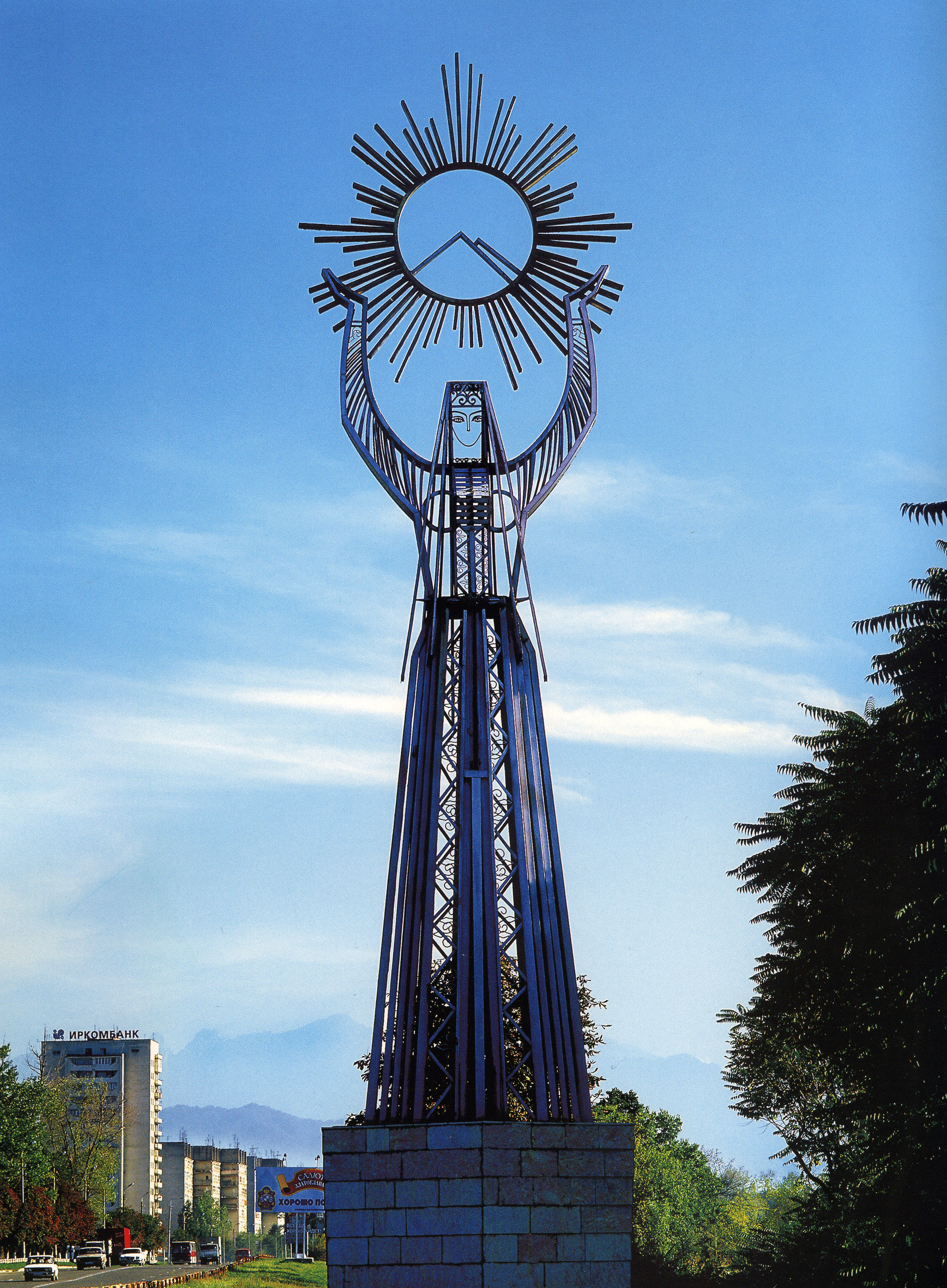
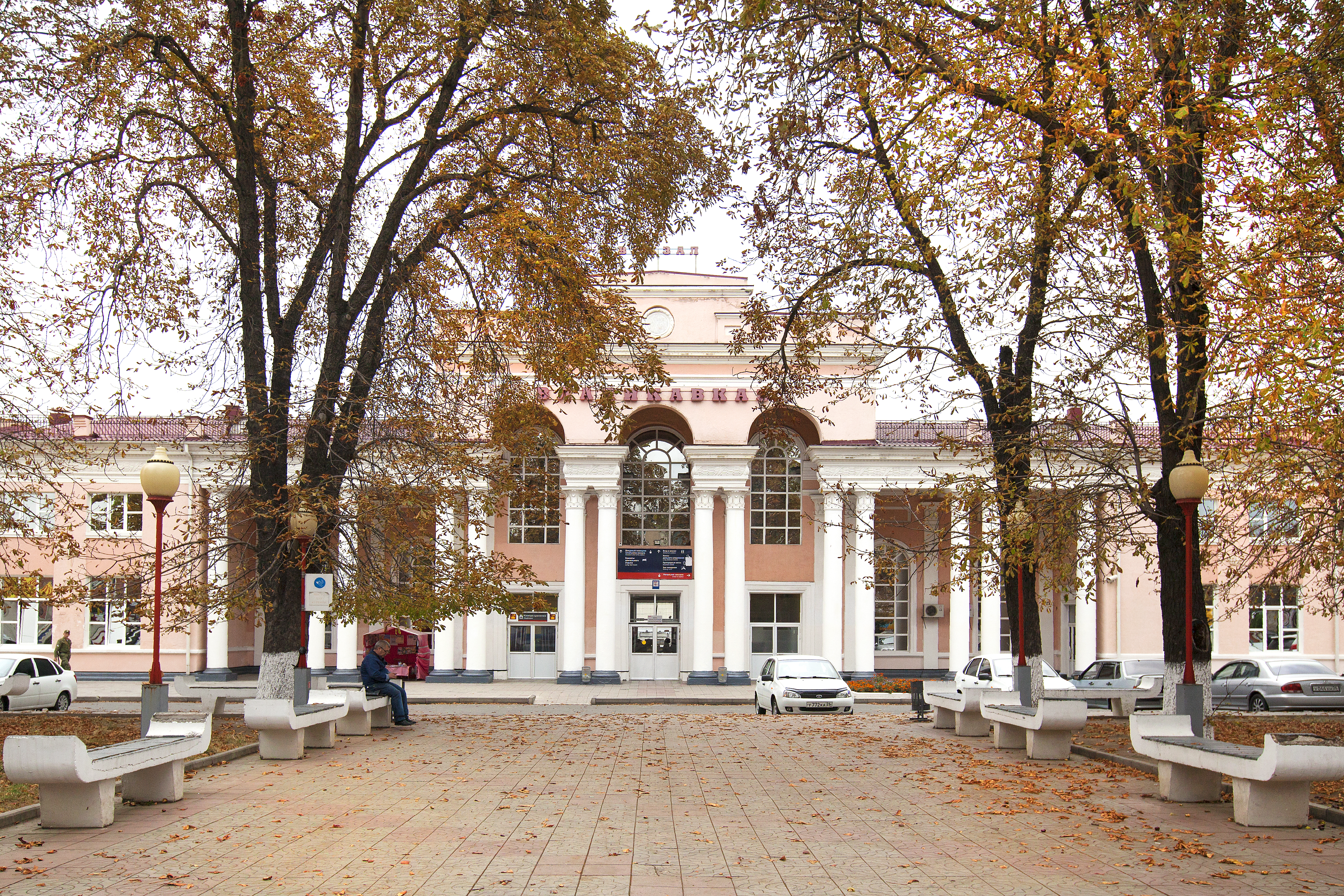
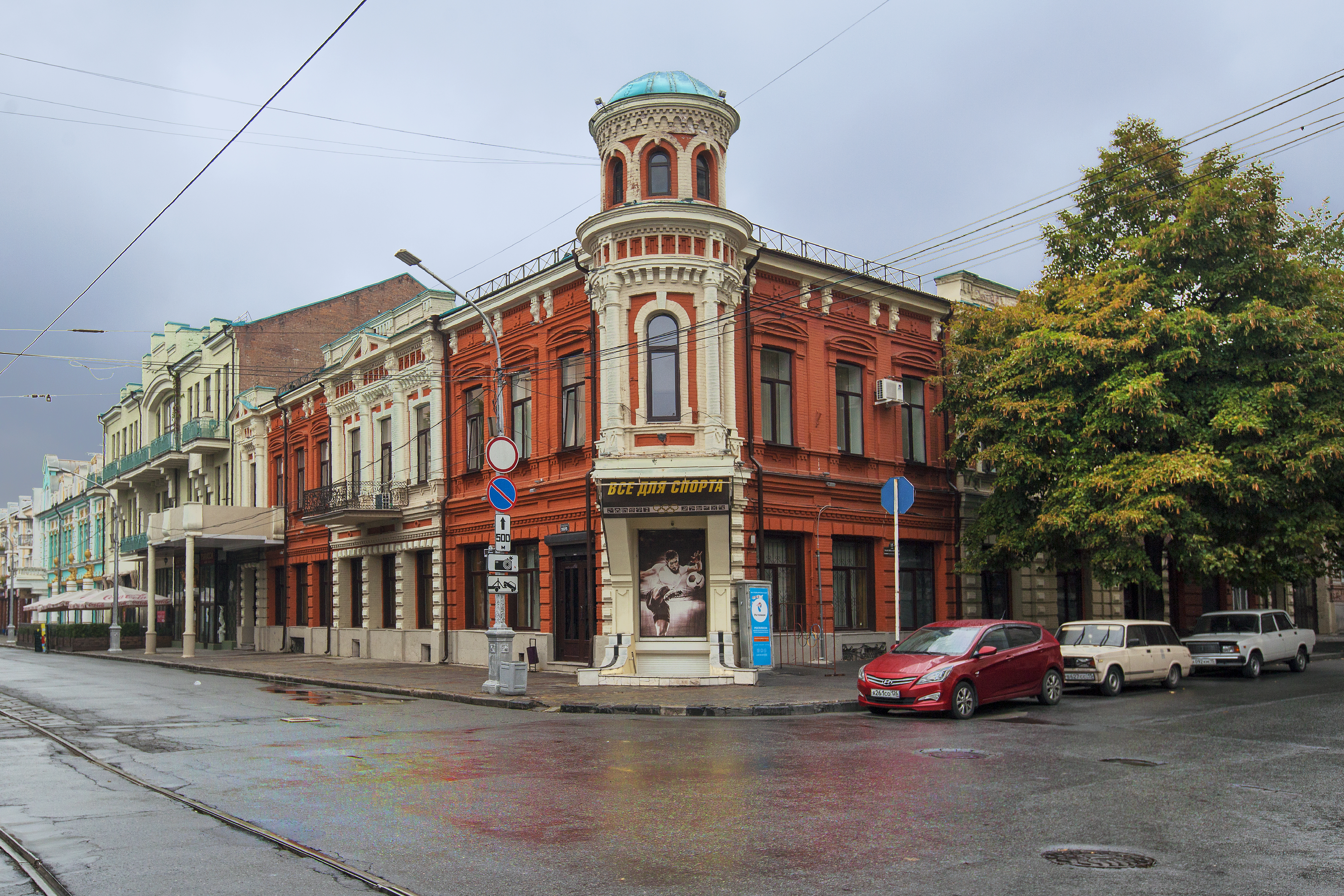
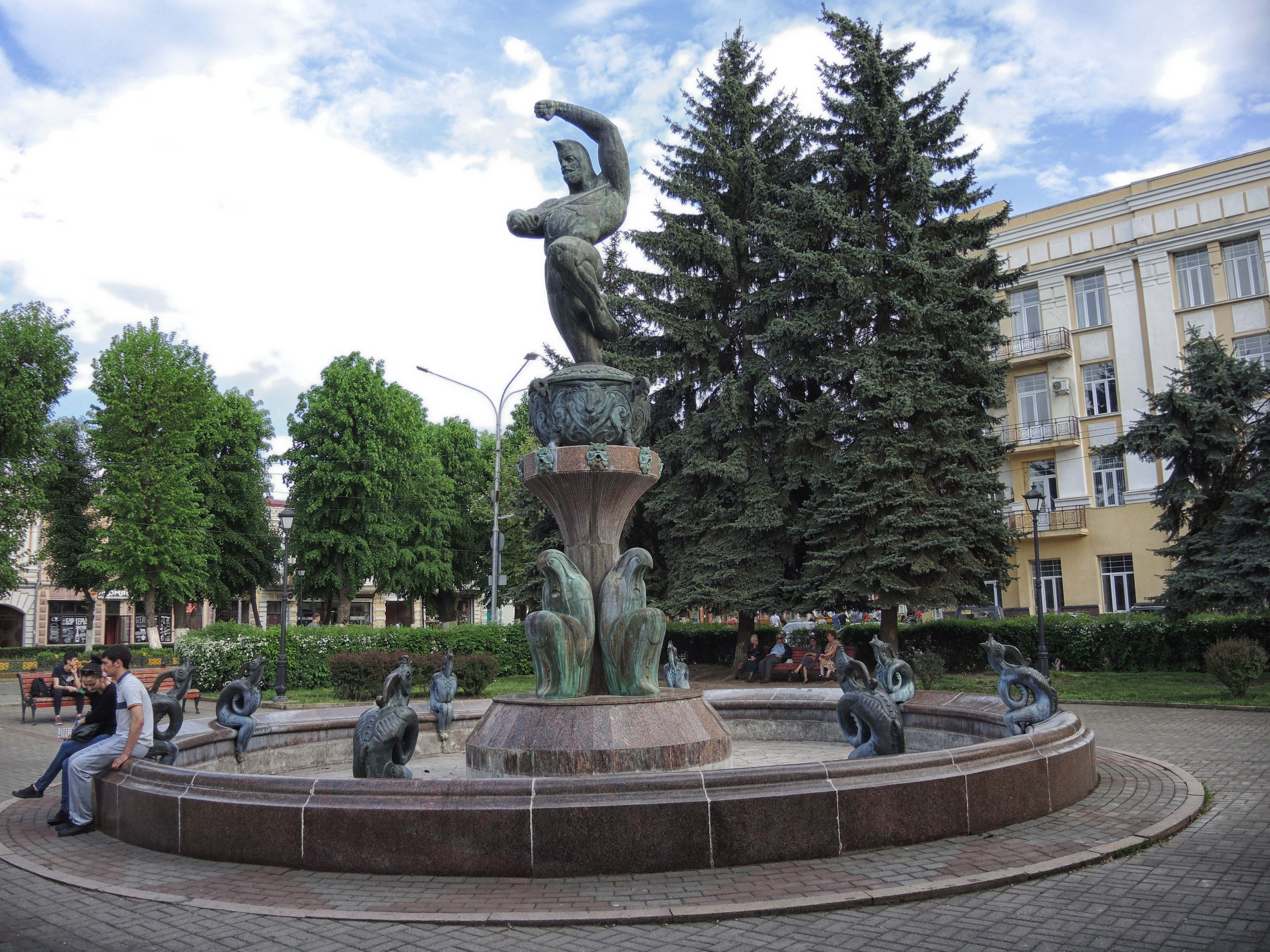
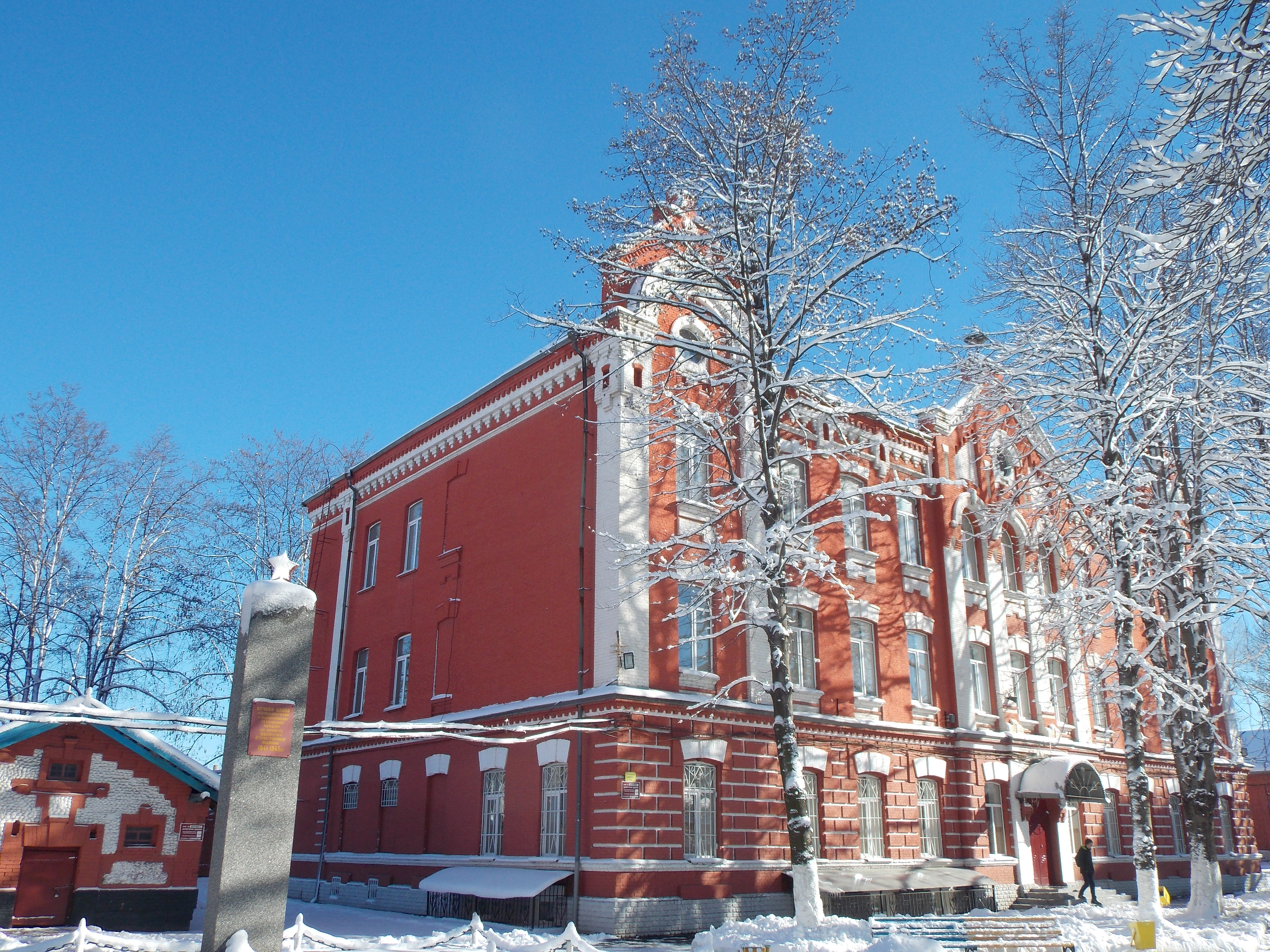
- Terek River view, Bai Gora in Kosta Khetagurov Park, Musical theatre, Dzaugu Búgulov statue, Sunni mosque at night, Lutheran church, Symbol of Vladikavkaz, Train station, Corner of Prospekt Mir and Gogol, Monument to Nart Soslan on Prospekt Mira, Learning Campus

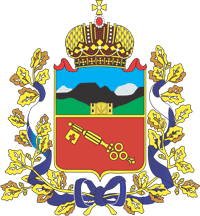
- Coat of arms
- Interactive map of Vladikavkaz
- Location of Vladikavkaz Vladikavkaz (European Russia) Vladikavkaz (Europe)
- Coordinates: 43°02′24″N 44°40′39″E
- Country: Russia
- Federal subject: North Ossetia–Alania
- Founded: May 6, 1784
- City status since: 1860

Government
  - Body: Assembly of Representatives
  - Head: Boris Albegov

Area
  - Total: 291 km^{2} (112 sq mi)
- Elevation: 692 m (2,270 ft)

Population (2010 Census)
  - Total: 311,693
  - Estimate (2025): 293,287 (−5.9%)
  - Rank: 60th in 2010
  - Density: 1,070/km^{2} (2,770/sq mi)

Administrative status
  - Subordinated to: Vladikavkaz City Under Republic Jurisdiction
  - Capital of: Republic of North Ossetia–Alania
  - Capital of: Vladikavkaz City Under Republic Jurisdiction

Municipal status
  - Urban okrug: Vladikavkaz Urban Okrug
  - Capital of: Vladikavkaz Urban Okrug
- Time zone: UTC+3 (MSK)
- Postal code: 362000
- Dialing code: +7 8672
- OKTMO ID: 90701000001
- City Day: September 25
- Website: vladikavkaz-osetia.ru

Vladikavkaz, (Note: English: /ˌvlædikəfˈkɑːz, -ɪ-, ˌvlɑːd-/ VLAD-ee-kəf-KAHZ, -ih-, VLAHD-; Russian: Владикавказ, pronounced [vlədʲɪkɐfˈkas]) formerly known as Ordzhonikidze, (Note: Russian: Орджоникидзе, romanized: Ordžonikidze, pronounced [ɐrdʐənʲɪˈkʲidzɛ]; Georgian: ორჯონიკიძე, romanized: Orjonik’idze, pronounced [ɔɾd͡ʒɔnik’id͡zɛ]) Dzaudzhikau, (Note: Iron Ossetian: Дзӕуджыхъӕу Dzæudžyqæu [d͡zɐwˈd͡ʒəqɐw]; Digor Ossetian: Дзӕуӕгигъӕу, Dzæuægihæu [d͡zʌˈwʌɡiʁʌw]) is the capital city of North Ossetia–Alania, Russia. It is located in the southeast of the republic at the foothills of the Caucasus, situated on the Terek River. The city's population was 311,693 as of the 2021 Census, making it one of the most populous cities in the North Caucasus region.

The city is an industrial and transportation centre. Manufactured products include processed zinc and lead, machinery, chemicals, clothing and food products.

== Etymology ==
The name Vladikavkaz, derived from Russian, literally means 'ruler of the Caucasus'. The Ossetian name Dzæudžyqæu literally means 'Dzaug's settlement', where qæu ('village') is a cognate of the Khotanese Saka word āguv ('village') and the Avestan word gava ('district').

In 1911, Dmitry Rakovich wrote that the Ossetians prove that fortress was founded on the site of the Ingush village Zaur by the name of Vladikavkaz in the Ossetian language:

...by their name of Vladikavkaz Dzaudzhi-Kau, the Ossetians confirm this opinion, since Dzauag is a proper name Zaur, and Kau means a village; otherwise - the village of Zaur.

In 1931, at the suggestion of the Ingush Regional Executive Committee, the city of Vladikavkaz was renamed Ordzhonikidze in honor of the Soviet political and military leader Sergo Ordzhonikidze, who during the Civil War established Soviet power in the region.

In 1944, after the deportation of the Chechens and Ingush, the city of Ordzhonikidze was renamed the city of Dzaudzhikau, and in 1954 again Ordzhonikidze. In 1990, the city acquired a double name: Vladikavkaz in Russian and Dzaudzhikau in Ossetian.

== History ==
The city was founded in 1784 as a Russian fortress at the entrance to the Darial Gorge near to the Ingush village Zaur, which had the purpose of serving as an outpost for the routes of communication between Russia and Georgia. But according to a lot of other sources, Vladikavkaz was founded on the site of the Ossetian village of Kapkai.

The Georgian Military Highway, crossing the mountains, was constructed in 1799 to link the city with Georgia to the south, and in 1875 a railway was built to connect it to Rostov-on-Don and Baku in Azerbaijan. Vladikavkaz has become an important industrial centre for the region, with smelting, refining, chemicals and manufacturing industries. During the Russian Empire, the settlement was the administrative capital of the Vladikavkazsky Okrug of the Terek Oblast.

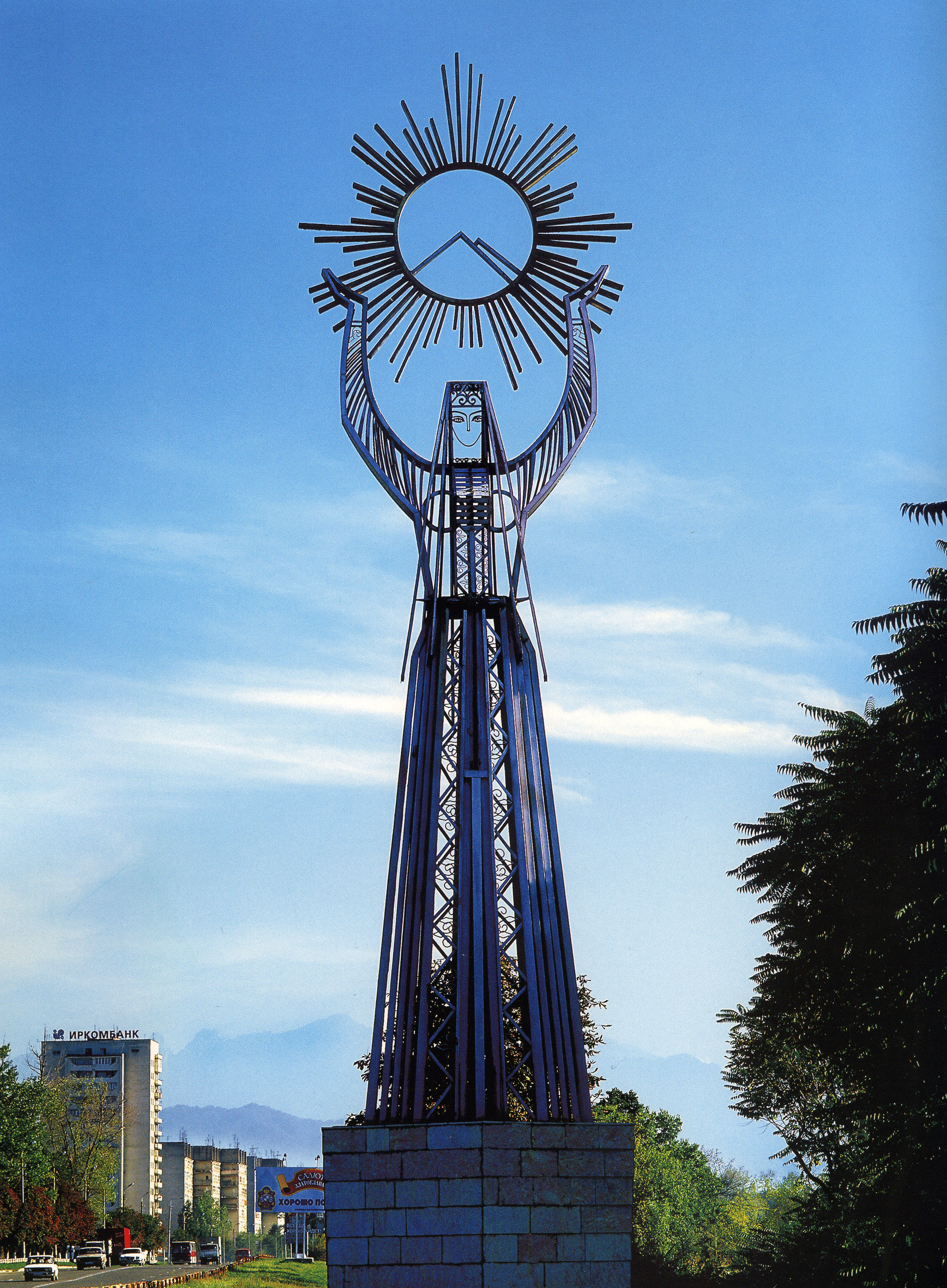
A monument in the city

The city is one of the largest in the Russian-controlled Caucasus, along with Grozny, and was the capital of the Mountain Autonomous Soviet Socialist Republic, a Soviet Republic established after the annexation of the Mountainous Republic of the North Caucasus. It existed from 1921 to 1924 and comprised most of the modern-day territories of Chechnya, North Ossetia and Kabardino-Balkaria.

Vladikavkaz was fought over in both the Russian Civil War and World War II. In February 1919, the anti-Communist Volunteer Army under General Anton Denikin seized the city, before being expelled by the Red Army in March 1920. In early November 1942, the forces of Nazi Germany tried unsuccessfully to seize the city but were repelled by the Soviet army. The Nazis left North Ossetia in January 1943.

On 26 November 2008, Vitaly Karayev, the mayor of Vladikavkaz, was assassinated by an unidentified gunman. On 31 December 2008, his successor, Kazbek Pagiyev, was also assassinated by unidentified gunmen.

== Administrative and municipal status ==
The Administrative divisions of Vladikavkaz is composed of four districts.

- Zaterechny district
- Iristonsky district
- Promishlenny district
- Severo-Zapadny district

Vladikavkaz is the capital of the republic. Within the framework of administrative divisions, it is, together with six rural localities, incorporated as Vladikavkaz City Under Republic Jurisdiction—an administrative unit with the status equal to that of the districts. As a municipal division, Vladikavkaz City Under Republic Jurisdiction is incorporated as Vladikavkaz Urban Okrug.

== Transportation ==
The city is served by the bus network (marshrutkas). There are also tram (since 1904) and trolleybus (since 1977) networks, plus the main Vladikavkaz railway station.

The city is served by Beslan Airport located about 9 kilometres from the city.

The Georgian Military Road, which is a part of European route E117, starts in Vladikavkaz and it connects the city with the South Caucasus.

== Population ==
According to the 1917 publication of the Kavkazskiy kalendar, Vladikavkaz had 73,243 residents in 1916, the national composition was as follows:

Nationality	Number	%
Russians (Note: The Kavkazskiy kalendar did not distinguish between Russians, Ukrainians, and Belarusians.)	46,876	64.0%
North Caucasians	8,539	11.7%
Armenians	8,326	11.4%
Other Europeans	6,139	8.4%
Shia Muslims	2,463	3.4%
Jews	798	1.1%
Roma	102	0.1%
TOTAL	73,243	100%

According to the results of the 2021 Census, the city population of Vladikavkaz was 311,338. The ethnic makeup of city's population was:

Nationality	Number	%
Ossetians	190,539	69.7%
Russians	60,052	22.0%
Armenians	7,953	2.9%
Georgians	4,478	1.6%
Ingush	1,802	0.7%
Azerbaijanis	1,655	0.6%
Others	6,818	2.5%
No ethnicity stated	38,041	–
TOTAL	311,338	100%

== Sports ==
Historical population
Year	Pop.	±%
1897	44,000	—
1926	73,599	+67.3%
1939	130,755	+77.7%
1959	164,420	+25.7%
1970	236,200	+43.7%
1979	278,930	+18.1%
1989	300,198	+7.6%
2002	315,608	+5.1%
2010	311,693	−1.2%
2021	295,830	−5.1%
Source: Census data

FC Spartak Vladikavkaz was an association football club based in Vladikavkaz, which won the Russian Premier League in 1995. The club folded in 2020, and was succeeded by FC Alania Vladikavkaz.

Vladikavkaz is home the Wrestling Academy of Aslan Khadartsev - the biggest wrestling academy in the South of Russia. It provides access to a number of facilities including a swimming pool, sauna, gym, personal dietitians, dorm rooms (which include a TV, comfortable beds, wardrobes, en-suite bathroom and showers), for 45 athletes and the main training hall, consisting of six mats- this academy is capable of hosting 250 wrestlers at one time.

== Main sights ==
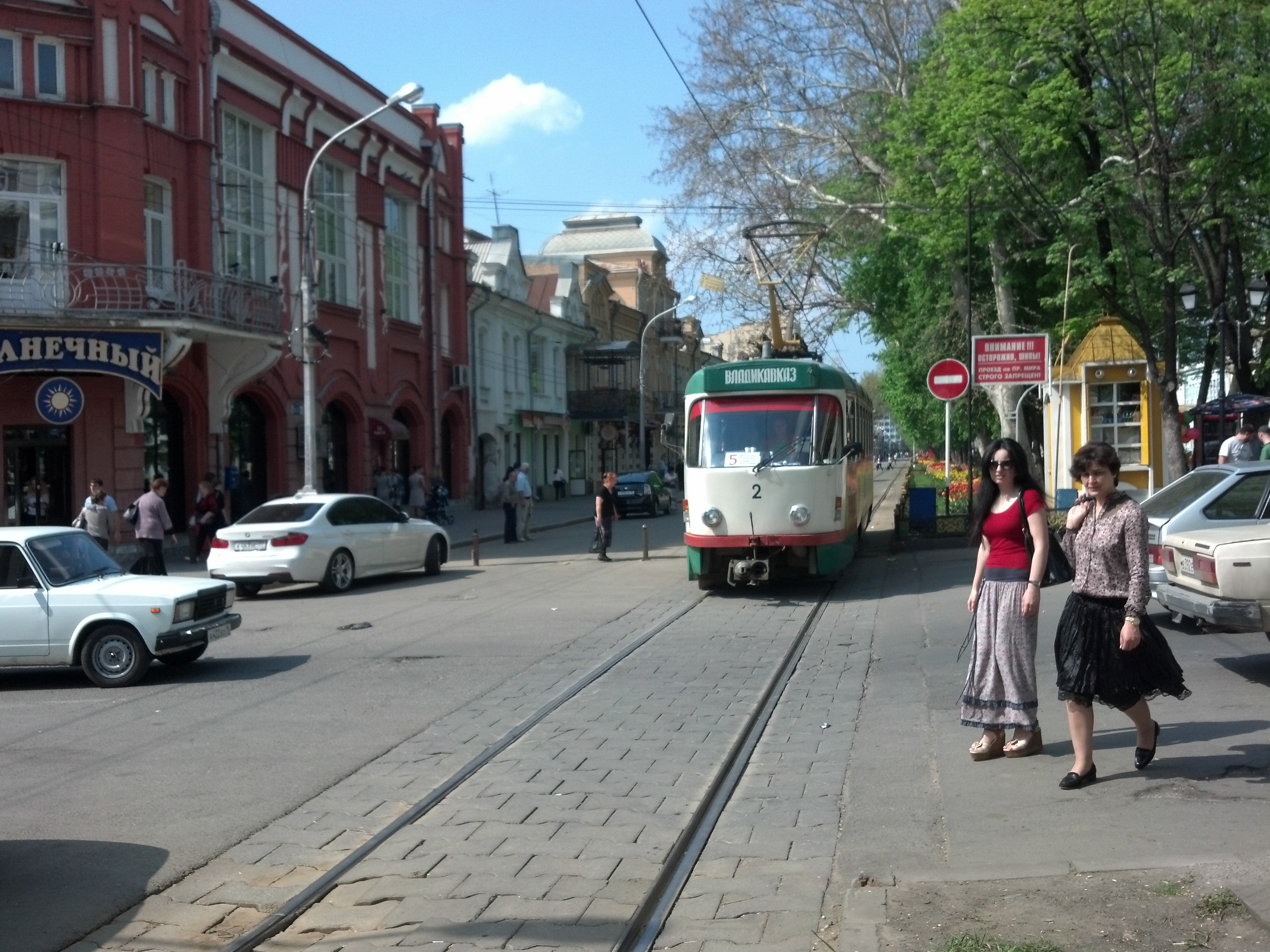
Mira avenue, Vladikavkaz

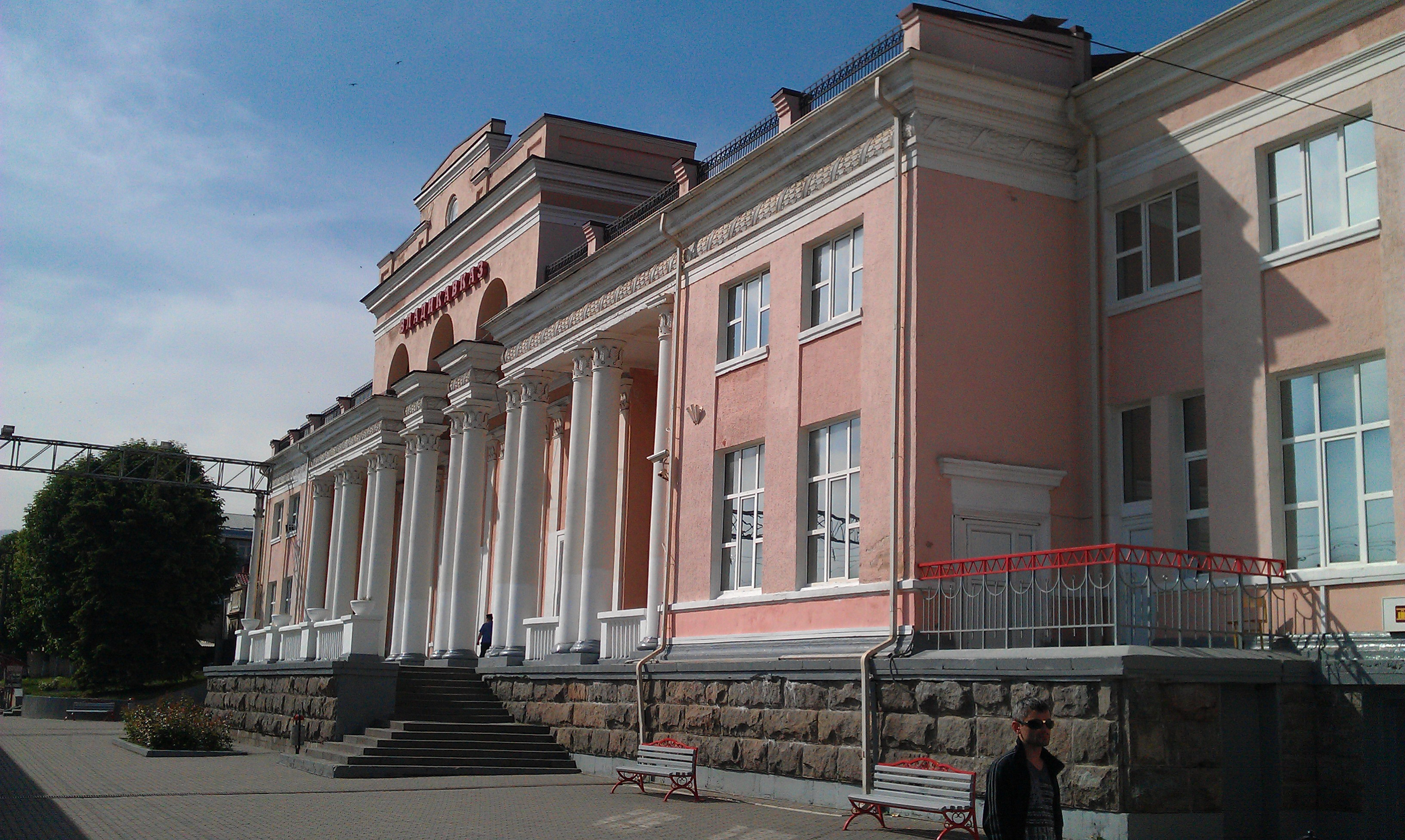
Vladikavkaz Railway station

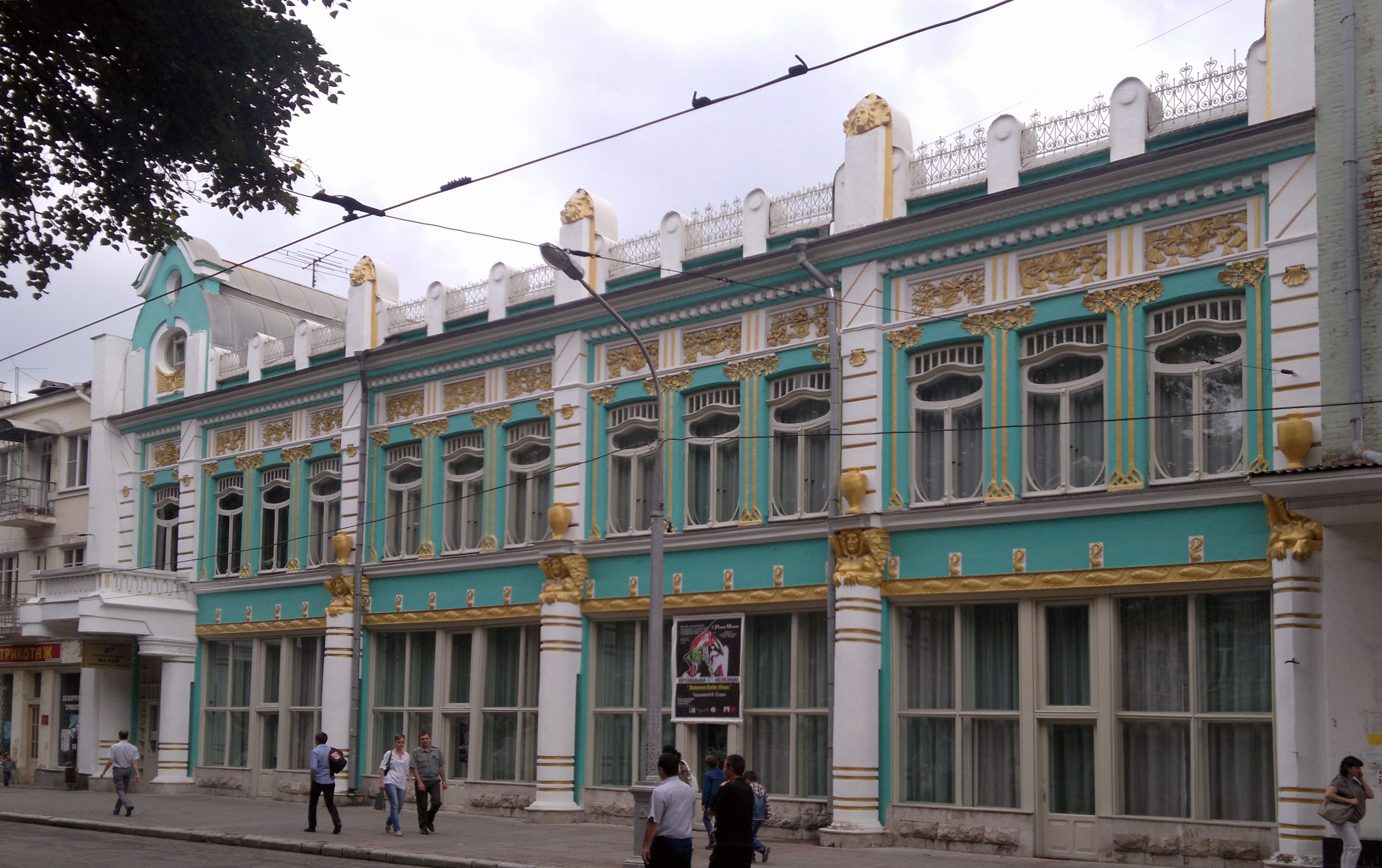
M. Tuganov Art Museum

The Mukhtarov Mosque, built in 1906, dominates the city. In Vladikavkaz, there is a guyed TV mast, 198 meters (650 ft) tall, built in 1961, which has six crossbars with gangways in two levels running from the mast structure to the guys.

== Education ==
=== Higher education ===
- Highlanders State Agrarian University
- North Caucasus University of Mining and Metallurgy
- North Ossetian State University
- North Ossetian State Medical Academy

== Religion ==
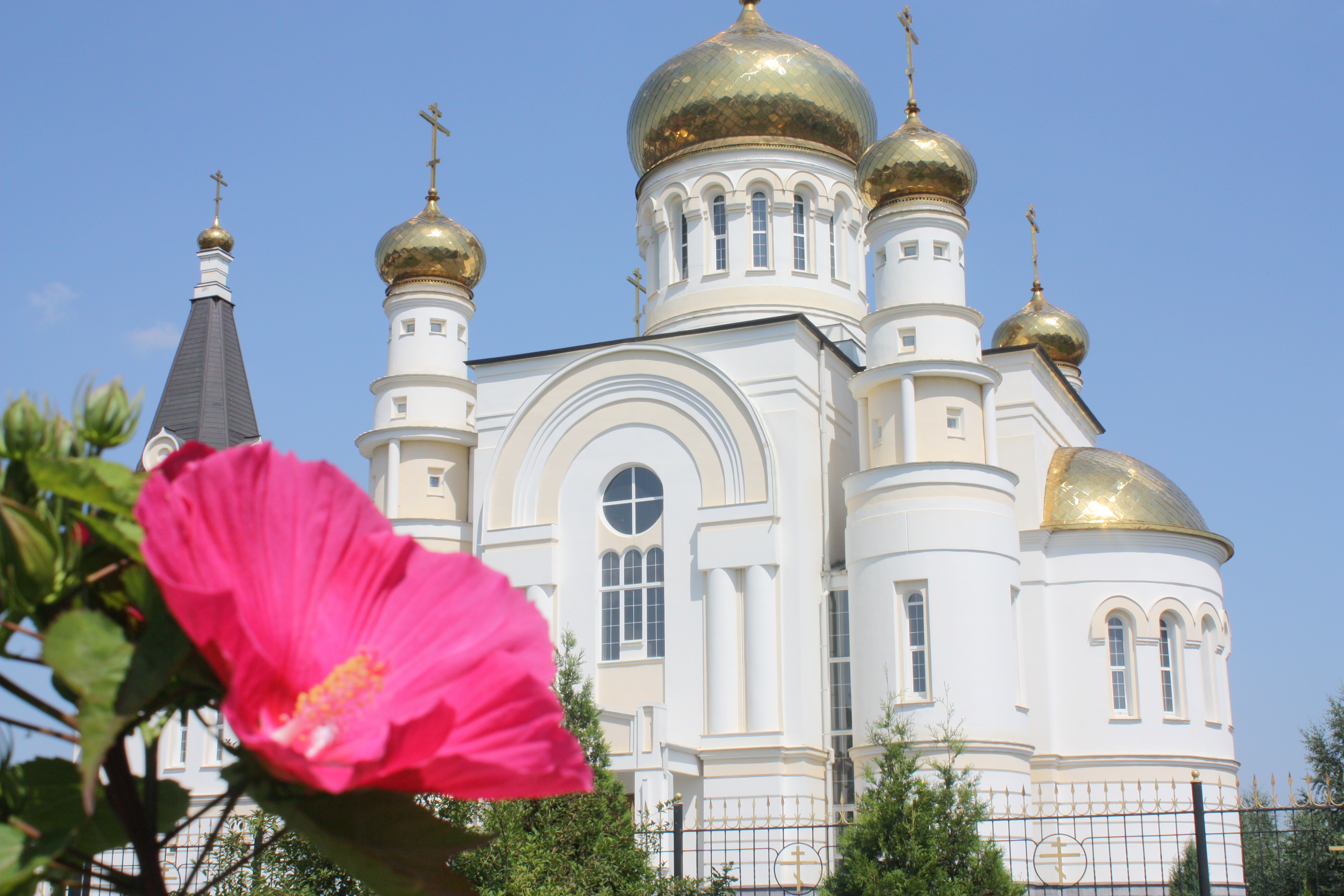
St. George's Orthodox Cathedral

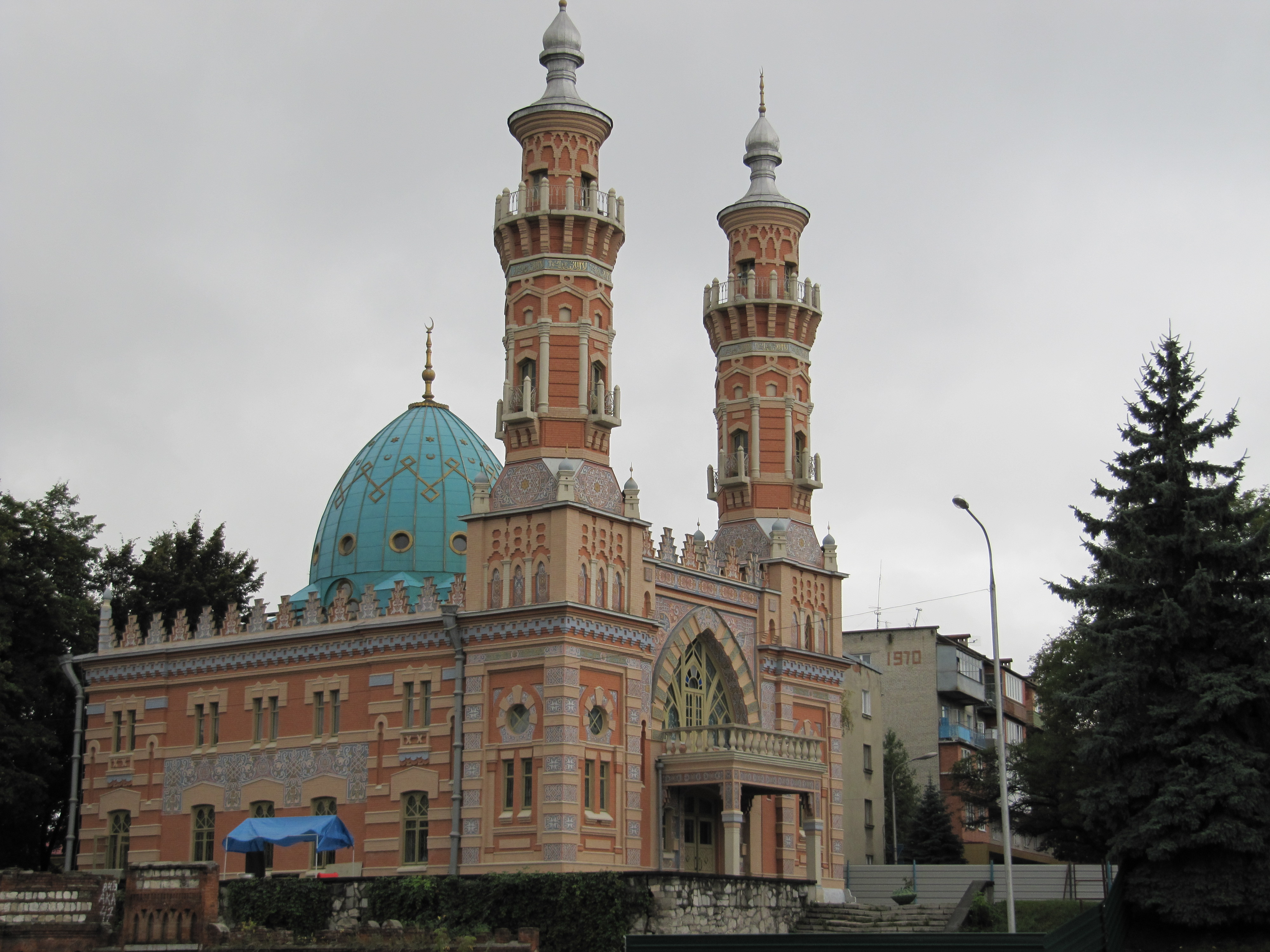
Mukhtarov Mosque

The city's primary religion is Eastern Orthodox Christianity, which is followed by the majority of Ossetians, Russians and Georgians. The rest of the Ossetian population adheres to the next largest religion, Sunni Islam, and to Uatsdin, an Ossetian folk religion, which is followed by 29% of the population nationwide. The remainder follow Protestantism, Armenian Orthodoxy and other beliefs.

== Twin towns and sister cities ==
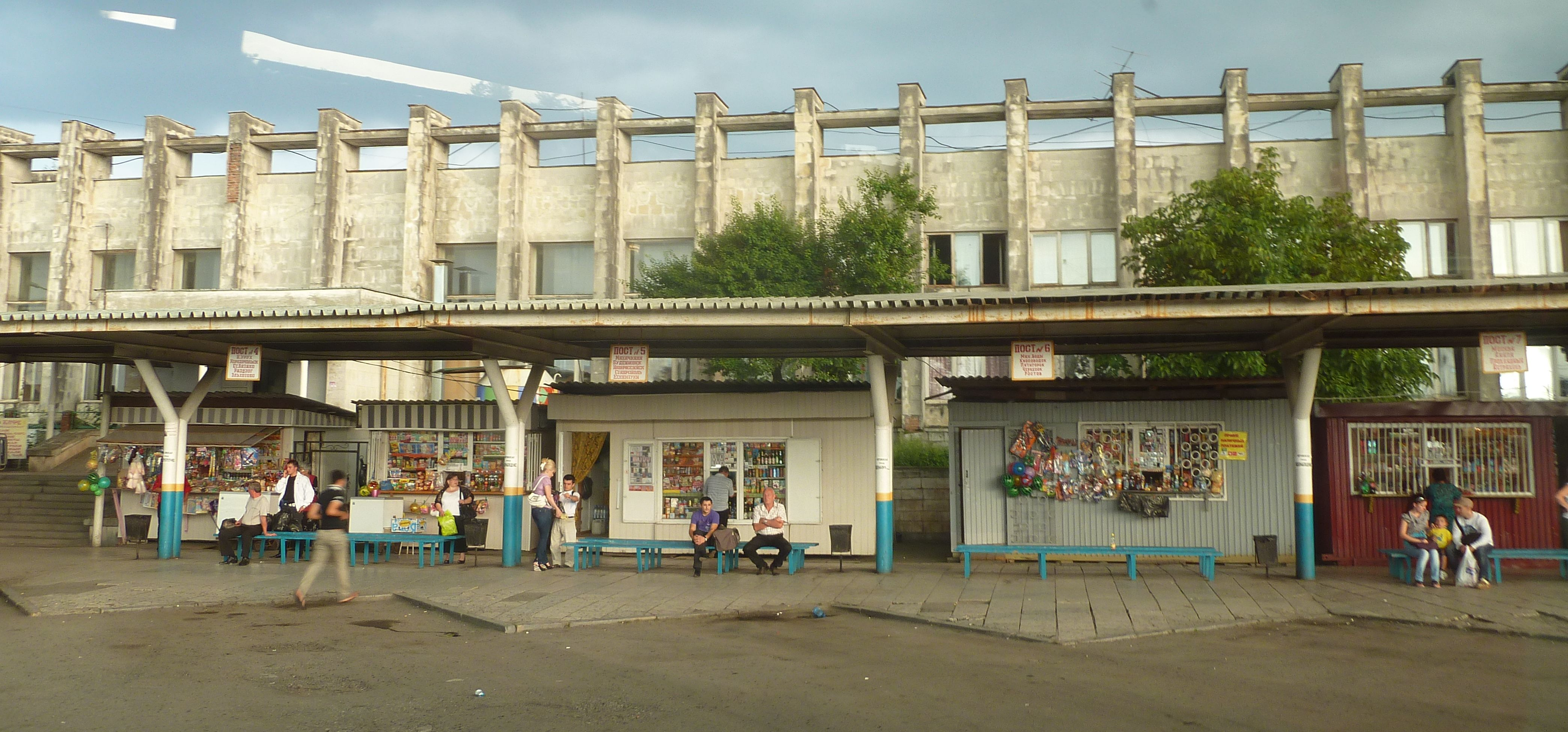
Vladikavkaz bus station

Vladikavkaz is twinned with:

- Ardahan, Turkey
- Asheville, United States
- Kardzhali, Bulgaria
- Nalchik, Russia
- Makhachkala, Russia
- Vladivostok, Russia

== Geography ==
=== Climate ===
Vladikavkaz experiences a humid continental climate (Köppen climate classification Dfb/Dwb) with warm, wet summers and cold, drier winters (though very mild for Russia).

Climate data for Vladikavkaz (1991–2020, extremes 1881–present)
Month	Jan	Feb	Mar	Apr	May	Jun	Jul	Aug	Sep	Oct	Nov	Dec	Year
Record high °C (°F)	21.1 (70.0)	23.0 (73.4)	30.3 (86.5)	34.0 (93.2)	37.2 (99.0)	38.0 (100.4)	37.5 (99.5)	39.2 (102.6)	38.2 (100.8)	33.5 (92.3)	28.7 (83.7)	27.2 (81.0)	39.2 (102.6)
Mean daily maximum °C (°F)	3.5 (38.3)	4.6 (40.3)	9.4 (48.9)	15.5 (59.9)	20.5 (68.9)	24.5 (76.1)	26.8 (80.2)	26.6 (79.9)	21.9 (71.4)	16.2 (61.2)	9.0 (48.2)	5.0 (41.0)	15.3 (59.5)
Daily mean °C (°F)	−1.7 (28.9)	−0.9 (30.4)	3.9 (39.0)	9.6 (49.3)	14.8 (58.6)	18.7 (65.7)	21.2 (70.2)	20.8 (69.4)	16.1 (61.0)	10.5 (50.9)	3.8 (38.8)	−0.3 (31.5)	9.7 (49.5)
Mean daily minimum °C (°F)	−5.2 (22.6)	−4.7 (23.5)	0.0 (32.0)	5.0 (41.0)	10.2 (50.4)	14.1 (57.4)	16.6 (61.9)	16.3 (61.3)	11.7 (53.1)	6.3 (43.3)	0.3 (32.5)	−3.8 (25.2)	5.6 (42.0)
Record low °C (°F)	−27.2 (−17.0)	−27.8 (−18.0)	−22.5 (−8.5)	−10.2 (13.6)	−6.1 (21.0)	2.2 (36.0)	6.4 (43.5)	6.0 (42.8)	0.0 (32.0)	−10.0 (14.0)	−23.1 (−9.6)	−25.0 (−13.0)	−27.8 (−18.0)
Average precipitation mm (inches)	31 (1.2)	34 (1.3)	62 (2.4)	94 (3.7)	148 (5.8)	181 (7.1)	112 (4.4)	90 (3.5)	71 (2.8)	62 (2.4)	40 (1.6)	30 (1.2)	955 (37.4)
Average extreme snow depth cm (inches)	8 (3.1)	9 (3.5)	4 (1.6)	0 (0)	0 (0)	0 (0)	0 (0)	0 (0)	0 (0)	0 (0)	1 (0.4)	5 (2.0)	9 (3.5)
Average precipitation days (≥ 1.0 mm)	6	6	10	10	14	13	10	9	8	8	6	6	106
Average rainy days	4	4	10	16	18	19	16	14	14	13	10	6	144
Average snowy days	12	13	11	2	0.2	0	0	0	0	1	7	10	56
Average relative humidity (%)	79	79	78	74	76	76	74	75	79	80	81	80	78
Mean monthly sunshine hours	106	119	133	159	194	205	220	208	167	148	114	103	1,876
Source 1: Pogoda.ru.net
Source 2: Гидрометцентр России (Precipitation days-Sun)

== Notable people ==
- ANIVAR (born 1997), Russian videoblogger and singer of Armenian descent
- Serob Grigoryan (born 1995), professional footballer
- Arthur Stepanyan (born 1987), former professional football player
- Vazgen Safaryants (born 1984), boxer
- Miyagi & Andy Panda, rappers
- Barsegh Kirakosyan (born 1982), Russian-born Armenian football coach and a former defender
- Nikolai Baratov (1865–1932), Cossack ataman and Imperial Russian Army General during WWI and the Russian Civil War.
- Ivan Prokhanov (1869–1935), Russian, Soviet, and emigre religious figure, engineer, poet, preacher, theologian, and politician
- Nureddin Akhriev (1904–1987), Ingush historian, caucasologist, arabist, encyclopedist, orientalist, translator.
- Lyubov Streicher (1888–1958), composer and founding member of the Society for Jewish Folk Music
- Alexander Kemurdzhian (1921–2003), Soviet mechanical engineer, best known for designing Lunokhod 1, the first ever planetary rover for space exploration
- Norat Ter-Grigoryants (born 1936), Soviet and Armenian general, prominent in his role in the First Nagorno-Karabakh War
- David Baev (born 1997), World champion freestyle wrestler
- Svitlana Bilyayeva (born 1946), archaeologist
- Stanislav Buchnev (born 1990), Russian-Armenian footballer, member of the Armenia national football team
- Lado Davydov (1924–1987), Soviet soldier, Hero of the Soviet Union
- Murat Gassiev (born 1993), professional boxer, unified cruiserweight world champion
- Valery Gazzaev (born 1954), Russian football manager and former footballer
- Valery Gergiev (born 1953), Russian conductor and opera company director
- Kazbek Hudalov (born 1959), Soviet soldier
- Ilia II of Georgia (1933–2026), Catholicos-Patriarch of All Georgia and the spiritual leader of the Georgian Orthodox Church
- Vitaly Kaloyev (born 1956), convicted murderer and former architect
- Aslan Karatsev (born 1993), Russian tennis player
- Dmitri Kobesov (born 1998), footballer
- Safarbek Malsagov (1868–1944), Russian general
- Oleg Penkovsky (1919–1963), Soviet military intelligence officer
- Issa Pliyev (1903–1979), Soviet military commander, twice Hero of the Soviet Union
- Vyacheslav Voronin (born 1974), Russian high jumper, gold medallist at the 1999 World Championships in Athletics

== Bibliography ==
=== Sources ===
- Бекова, А. И.; Дударов, У. Б.; Илиева, Ф. М.; Мальсагова, Л. Д.; Тариева, Л. У. (2009). Ингушско-русский словарь [Ingush-Russian Dictionary] (in Ingush and Russian). Нальчик: «Республиканский полиграфкомбинат им. Революции 1905 г.». pp. 1–990. ISBN 978-5-88195-965-4.
- Барахоева, Н. М.; Кодзоев, Н. Д.; Хайров, Б. А. (2016). Ингушско-русский словарь терминов [Ingush-Russian dictionary of terms] (in Ingush and Russian) (2nd ed.). Нальчик: ООО «Тетраграф». pp. 1–288.
- Кодзоев, Н. Д. (2021). Хайрова, Р. Р. (ed.). Русско-ингушский словарь [Russian-Ingush Dictionary] (in Ingush and Russian). Ростов-на-Дону: Типография «Лаки Пак». pp. 1–656. ISBN 978-5-906785-55-8.
- Мальсагов, З. К. (1925). Ингушская грамматика со сборником ингушских слов [Ingush grammar with a collection of Ingush words] (in Russian). Владикавказ: Гостипография „СВЕТ“ И. А. О. pp. 1–224.
- Uzhakhov, M. G. (1927). Ингушско-русский словарик [Ingush-Russian Dictionary] (in Ingush and Russian). Vladikavkaz: Kraynatsizdat. pp. 1–185.
- Газиков, Б. Д.; Кодзоев, Н. Д.; Тангиев, А. У. (2002). Материалы по истории Владикавказа [Materials on the history of Vladikavkaz] (in Russian). Назрань: Кеп. pp. 1–33.
- Бутков, П. Г. (1837). "Мнѣніе о книгѣ: Славянскія древности" [Opinion about the book: Slavic antiquities]. Три древніе договора руссовъ съ норвежцами и шведами [Three ancient treaties of the Russians with the Norwegians and the Swedes] (in Russian). Санкт-Петербург: Типографія Министерства внутреннихъ дѣлъ. pp. 1–66 (311–378 as PDF).
- Терский областной статистический комитет (1895). Вертепов, Г. А. (ed.). Терскій календарь. Вып. 5 [Tersky Calendar] (in Russian). Владикавказъ: Типографія Терскаго областнаго правленія. pp. 1–426.
- Ракович, Д. В. (1911). Прошлое Владикавказа. Краткая историческая справка ко дню пятидесятилетнего юбилея города. 1861 г. [The past of Vladikavkaz. Brief historical background to the fiftieth anniversary of the city. 1861] (in Russian) (3rd ed.). Владикавказ: Электропеч. Р. Сегаль и С-вья. pp. 3–28.
- Союз горцев Кавказа в ЧСР (1924). "Кавказский горец" [Caucasian highlander] (in Russian) (1). Прага: Издание Союза горцев Кавказа в ЧСР: 3–79.
- Поспелов, Е. М. (2008). Географические названия России. Топонимический словарь [Geographical names of Russia. Toponymic Dictionary] (in Russian). Москва: АСТ, Астрель. pp. 1–523. ISBN 978-5-17-054966-5.
- Адрианов, С. А., ed. (1913). "Варяги до Выла" [Varangians to Vyla]. Русская Энциклопедія (in Russian). Vol. 4. СПб: Русское Книжное товарищество „Дѣятель“. pp. 1–473.
- Кавказский календарь на 1917 год [Caucasian calendar for 1917] (in Russian) (72nd ed.). Tiflis: Tipografiya kantselyarii Ye.I.V. na Kavkaze, kazenny dom. 1917. Archived from the original on November 4, 2021.

=== Documents ===
- Верховный Совет Республики Северная Осетия. 12 ноября 1994 г. «Республика Северная Осетия-Алания. Конституция.», в ред. Конституционного Закона №5-РКЗ от 4 декабря 2013 г. «О внесении изменений в Конституцию Республики Северная Осетия–Алания». Вступил в силу 7 декабря 1994 г. Опубликован: брошюрой "Конституция Республики Северная Осетия–Алания". (Supreme Council of the Republic of North Ossetia. November 12, 1994 Republic of North Ossetia–Alania. Constitution., as amended by the Constitutional Law #5-RKZ of December 4, 2013 On Amending the Constitution of the Republic of North Ossetia–Alania. Effective as of December 7, 1994.).
- Закон №34-РЗ от 9 июля 2007 г. «Об административно-территориальном устройстве Республики Северная Осетия-Алания», в ред. Закона №44-РЗ от 12 ноября 2013 г. «О внесении изменений в Приложение к Закону Республики Северная Осетия–Алания "Об административно-территориальном устройстве Республики Северная Осетия–Алания" и Закон Республики Северная Осетия–Алания "Об установлении границ муниципального образования Алагирский район, наделении его статусом муниципального района, образовании в его составе муниципальных образований — городского и сельских поселений"». Вступил в силу со дня официального опубликования. Опубликован: "Северная Осетия", №148(24949), 16 августа 2007 г. (Law #34-RZ of July 9, 2007 On the Administrative-Territorial Structure of the Republic of North Ossetia–Alania, as amended by the Law #44-RZ of November 12, 2013 On Amending the Appendix to the Law of the Republic of North Ossetia–Alania "On the Administrative-Territorial Structure of the Republic of North Ossetia–Alania" and the Law of the Republic of North Ossetia–Alania "On Establishing the Borders of the Municipal Formation of Alagirsky District, Granting It the Status of a Municipal District, Establishing Municipal Formations—Urban and Rural Settlements—Within Its Structure". Effective as of the official publication date.).
- Закон №10-РЗ от 5 марта 2005 г. «Об установлении границ муниципального образования город Владикавказ, наделении его статусом городского округа», в ред. Закона №34-РЗ от 19 июля 2006 г «О внесении изменений в Закон Республики Северная Осетия-Алания "Об установлении границ муниципального образования город Владикавказ, наделении его статусом городского округа"». Вступил в силу 1 марта 2005 г. Опубликован: "Северная Осетия", №43 (24344), 15 марта 2005 г. (Law #10-RZ of March 5, 2005 On Establishing the Borders of the Municipal Formation of the City of Vladikavkaz and On Granting It Urban Okrug Status, as amended by the Law #34-RZ of July 19, 2006 On Amending the Law of the Republic of North Ossetia–Alania "On Establishing the Borders of the Municipal Formation of the City of Vladikavkaz and On Granting It Urban Okrug Status". Effective as of March 1, 2005.).
