= Kazbek Pagiyev =

Russian politician (1959–2008)

- Born: Казбек Хазбиевич Пагиев; 22 February 1959; Alagir, North Ossetian ASSR
- Died: 31 December 2008 (aged 49); Vladikavkaz, North Ossetia
- Cause of death: Gunshot
- Occupations: Mayor of Vladikavkaz; Deputy Prime Minister of North Ossetia
- Term: February 2008 – 31 December 2008

Kazbek Khazbiyevich Pagiyev (Russian: Казбек Хазбиевич Пагиев) (22 February 1959 – 31 December 2008) was a Russian politician who was assassinated in 2008.

== Early life ==
Pagiyev was born Alagir on 22 February 1959.

== Career ==
Pagiyev was the former deputy prime minister of North Ossetia. He was the mayor of its capital, Vladikavkaz, from 2002 to December 2007. He was replaced by late Vitaly Karayev as mayor. He resigned as deputy prime minister in December 2008. His term was short, from November to December 2008.

== Assassination ==
Pagiyev was killed by two unknown assailants on 31 December 2008 as he was being driven in his car in Vladikavkaz. His driver was also killed in the attack. There was speculation that the murders of Pagiyev and his mayoral predecessor Vitaly Karayev were connected, or possibly carried out by the same people.

In March 2009, nine men were arrested due to their alleged involvement in assassinations of Karayev and Pagiyev. Pagiyev's killer, Alexander Jussoyev, was sentenced to 20 years in prison on 11 August 2011. Jussoyev was said to be a member of an organized crime group led by Aslan Gagiyev.
