= Kazbek Hudalov =

Kazbek Akhtimirovich Hudalov (Казбек Ахтемирович Худалов), an Ossetian born in 1959, was a Soviet soldier who was initially reported to have been captured during the Soviet invasion of Afghanistan, but was later revealed to have been a "notorious traitor" and one of the highest ranked Soviets who defected to fight with the Mujahideen repelling the occupation.

== Service in the Soviet Army ==
A native of Vladikavkaz in North Ossetia–Alania, Hudalov graduated from the Ordzhenikidze Command School, and the military academy in Almaty.

He joined the Soviet Army on 1 September 1977 and was deployed to Afghanistan in August 1983.

He was a lieutenant in the Soviet Army and was listed as "captured" by Mujahideen in Parwan on 16 September 1984 after he went to search for a subordinate and never returned. However, by early 1985 it was clear that he had defected and was fighting with the insurgents.

== Defection to the Mujahideen ==
Hudalov defected from the Soviet army to join the Mujahideen and surrounded himself with a group of approximately a dozen similar deserters of largely Tajik descent. The group focused its attacks on the 40th Army and Democratic Republic of Afghanistan outposts, frequently dressing in Soviet military uniforms to approach targets.

In autumn 1988, Hudalov was believed to be operating around Bagram, but as the group moved towards the Panjshir mountains, it ceased to visibly operate.
