= Kazbek Akbaev =

Russian chess grandmaster (born 1981)

Personal information
- Born: June 8, 1981 (age 45) Cherkessk, Soviet Union

Chess career
- Country: Russia
- Title: Grandmaster (2015)
- FIDE rating: 2465 (July 2026)
- Peak rating: 2504 (February 2015)

Kazbek Akbaev (born June 8, 1981) is a Russian chess grandmaster titled in 2015. He was born in Russia.
