= Kazbek (cigarettes) =

Soviet cigarette brand

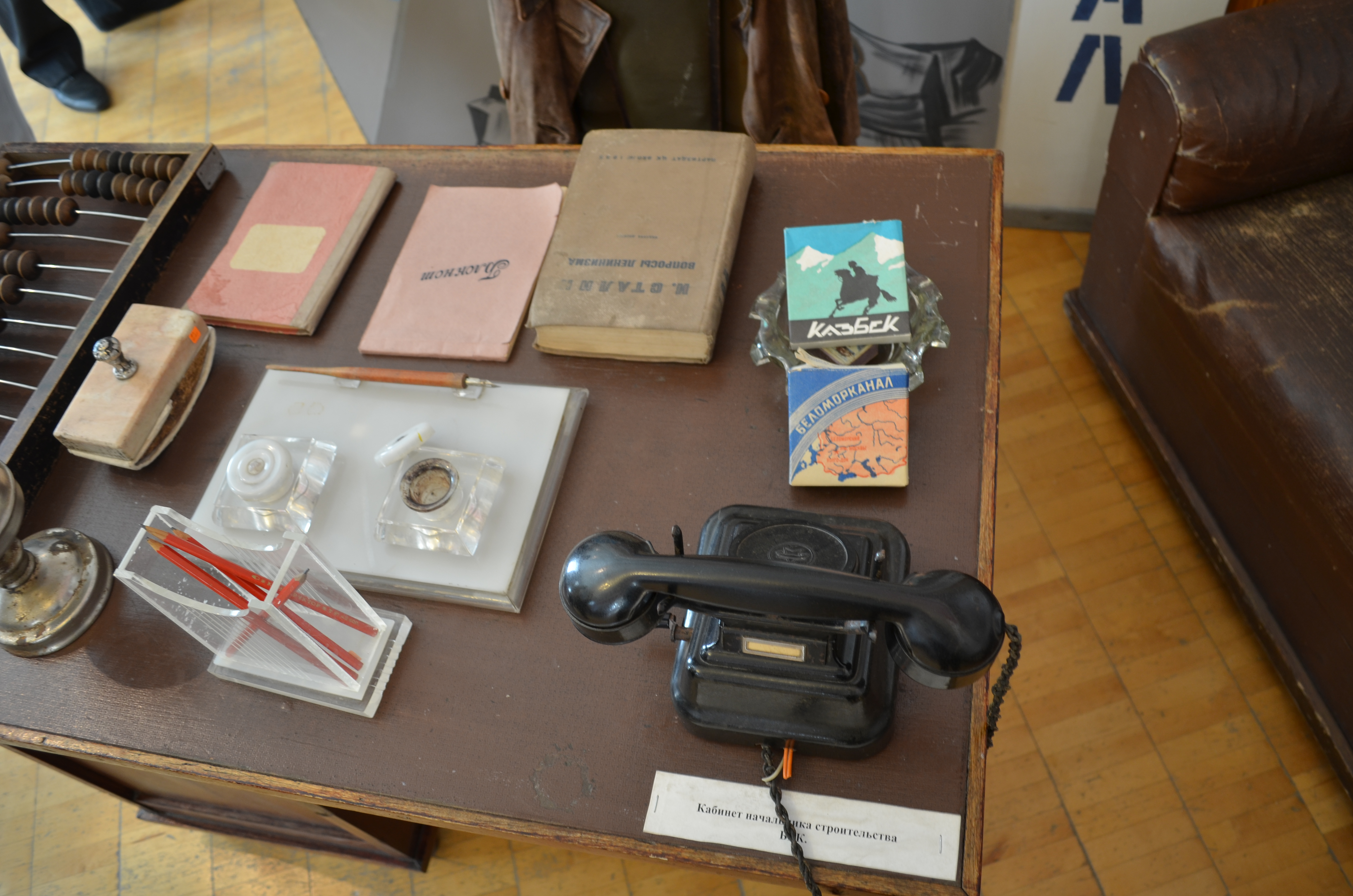
A pack of Kazbek is seen on the table at a Gulag exposition in the Medvezhyegorsk museum

Kazbek (Russian: Казбек) was a brand of papirosas in the Soviet Union named after Mount Kazbek, Caucasus.

The author of the design of the case, Robert Grabbe, allegedly intended to please Joseph Stalin: the image of a Caucasian horse rider on the background of Mount Kazbek was supposed to remind Stalin his motherland of Georgia. Kazbek was a higher tier of papirosas and its smoking was indicative of belonging to the Soviet elite, nomenklatura.

Kazbek belongs to papirosy of top grade No. 3, made from a blend of Samsun tobacco (Transcaucasian or Central Asian), Dubek (Southern Coast or Central Asian), and Ostrokonets. Within this blend, 30% consists of second commercial grade tobacco, 20% of third grade “A,” and 50% of skeletal tobaccos of any type except Voronezh (including 40% second grade and 10% third grade “A”). The cigarettes are noted for their pleasant aroma and increased strength. The creator of the recipe was tobacco master Vasily Ioanidi.
