= Malsagov =

Malsagov (Ingush: Малсагнаькъан, romanized: Malsagnäqhan; Georgian: Malsagishvili; the name of an Ingush clan, see Малсаганаькъан) is a Russian-language style Ingush surname derived from Ingush given name Malsag with Russian patronymic suffix -ov. By the late 18th century, the family emerged as one of the most prominent and influential families in the Nazran society.

== Notable members ==
- Ahmed Malsagov, Ingush Russian pilot
- Ahmed Malsagov (politician), Ingush Russian politician
- Safarbek Malsagov, Ingush Russian general
- Sozerko Malsagov (1895–1976), Russian Imperial Army officer known for his memoir about his escape Solovki prison camp
