= Avdya =

Avdya may refer to:

- Avdya, a diminutive of the Russian male first name Avdelay
- Avdya, a diminutive of the Russian male first name Avdey
- Avdya, a diminutive of the Russian male first name Avdiky
- Avdya, a diminutive of the Russian male first name Avdon
