= Avdyusha =

Avdyusha may refer to:

- Avdyusha, a diminutive of the Russian male first name Avdey
- Avdyusha, a diminutive of the Russian male first name Avdiky
- Avdyusha, a diminutive of the Russian male first name Avdon
