= Avda (given name) =

Avda (Russian: А́вда) is an old and rare Russian Christian male first name. It is possibly derived from either the Biblical Hebrew word abdā, meaning (god's) slave, (god's) servant, or the Greek word audē, meaning speech, prophecy.

The patronymics derived from "Avda" are "А́вдич" (Avdich; masculine) and "А́вдична" (Avdichna; feminine).

"Avda" is also a colloquial form of the male first names Avdakt and Avdiky and a diminutive of the male first names Avdey and Avdon.
