= Kamel =

Kamel (Arabic: كامل) is a given name meaning perfect or the perfect one. It may refer to:

== People with the given name Kamel ==
- Kamel Ajlouni (born 1943), Jordanian endocrinologist
- Kamel al-Budeiri (1882–1923), Palestinian politician
- Kamel al-Kilani (born 1958), Iraqi politician
- Kamel Al-Mousa (born 1982), Saudi Arabian football player
- Kamel Asaad (1932–2010), Lebanese politician
- Kamel Ayari, Tunisian wheelchair racer
- Kamel Boughanem (born 1979), Moroccan-French football player
- Kamel Chafni (born 1982), Moroccan football player
- Kamel Ghilas (born 1984), Algerian football player
- Kamel Hana Gegeo (died 1988), Iraqi murder victim
- Kamel Habri (born 1976), Algerian football player
- Kamel Kardjena (born 1981), Algerian Paralympic athlete
- Kamel Lemoui (1939-2022), Algerian footballer
- Kamel Maghur (1935–2002), Libyan lawyer
- Kamel Marek (born 1980), Algerian football player
- Kamel Morjane (born 1948), Tunisian politician
- Kamel Nacif Borge (born 1946), Mexican businessman
- Kamel Ouejdide (1980-2024), French-Moroccan football player
- Kamel Rabat Bouralha (21st century), Algerian-British prisoner of Russia
- Kamel Ramdani (born 1981), French-Algerian football player
- Kamel Sidky (1885–1946), Egyptian lawyer and politician
- Kamel Amin Thaabet (1924–1965), Israeli spy
- Kamel Zaiem (born 1983), Tunisian footballer

== People with the middle name Kamel ==
- Mohamed Kamel Amr (born 1942), Egyptian diplomat
- Abdullah Kamel Abdullah Kamel Al Kandari (born 1973), Kuwaiti extrajudicial prisoner of the United States
- Hassan Kamel Al-Sabbah (1895–1935), Lebanese engineer

== People with the surname Kamel ==
- Bishoy Kamel (1931–1979), Egyptian saint
- Fateh Kamel (born 1961), Algerian-Canadian alleged terrorist
- Fathi Kamel (born 1955), Kuwaiti footballer
- Florence Jaukae Kamel, Papua New Guinea artist and designer
- Georg Joseph Kamel (1661–1706), Czech botanist and pharmacist, active in the Philippines
- Henry Ford Kamel (1961–2012), Ghanaian banker and politician
- Hussein Kamel of Egypt (1853–1917), Sultan of Egypt
- Hussein Kamel al-Majid (1954-1996), Iraqi general
- Ibrahim Kamel (born 1988), Iraqi football player
- Kamel Asaad (1932-2010), Lebanese politician
- Kamel Larbi (footballer) (born 1985), Algerian football player
- Nada Kamel (born 1990) is an Egyptian archer
- Saddam Kamel (1960-1996), Iraqi murder victim
- Saleh Abdullah Kamel (1941-2020), Saudi Arabian businessman
- Stanley Kamel (1943–2008), American television actor
- Tarek Kamel (1962-2019), Egyptian politician
- Yusuf Saad Kamel (born 1983), Bahraini athlete

== See also ==
- Kamil
