= Black Widow (Chechnya) =

Term for Islamist Chechen female suicide bombers

A Black Widow (Russian: чёрная вдова, romanized: chyornaya vdova) or Shahidka (шахидка—Russian feminine gender derivation from shahid) is a Chechen female suicide bomber with Islamist motives. They became known at the Moscow theater hostage crisis of October 2002. The commander Shamil Basayev referred to the shahidkas as a part of force of his suicide bombers called the Riyad-us Saliheen Brigade of Martyrs. Basayev stated that he himself trained at least fifty of the Black Widows. The female suicide bombers have carried out over 65% of the 23 terrorist attacks linked to the Chechen movement since 2000. The Black Widows are associated with terrorist attacks in Chechnya between 1999 and 2005.

The term "Black Widows" probably originates from these women being widows of men killed by the Russian federal forces in Chechnya (the connotation of black widow spider is intended). The Black Widows wear black dresses and dark clothing that covers their bodies from head to toe. This attire is supposed to symbolize their personal losses from the Chechen wars. In 2003, the Russian journalist Yulia Yuzik coined the phrase "Brides of Allah" (Невесты Аллаха, Nevesty Allakha) when she described the process by which Chechen women were recruited by Basayev and his associates; the phrase was used again after the Beslan attack, as the title of an installment of the Russian NTV programme Top Secret (Совершенно секретно).

== Background ==
The women took part in hostage taking; women were needed because it was culturally unacceptable amongst Islamists for men to be with female hostages.

To terrorists, Black Widows are considered less valuable than male terrorists, since male terrorists require formal training, while women terrorists are viewed as expendable. In some cases, when opinions do not match between Black Widows and male terrorists, male terrorists detonate bombs strapped onto Black Widows to get rid of them. Additionally, women terrorists are strategically appealing because they symbolize opposing their traditional roles of being obedient, also women terrorists arouse less suspicion, which terrorists groups are able to take advantages of. Between 1998 and 2001, according to professor Richard Pape of University of Chicago, the average number of deaths caused by a suicide attack is 13 people, while the average deaths caused by suicide attacks from Black Widows is 28, meaning they are twice as deadly as the average suicide bomber.

There are currently forty-seven Chechen Female bombers that have been confirmed based on twenty five successful bombings. These attacks methods include detonating bombs on trucks, cars, usage of explosive devices, or using suicide belts or bags. Some have even detonated their bombs on airplanes.

According to Marc Sagement, who takes part in the Foreign Policy Research Institute's Center for the Study of Terrorism, there is a strong relationship between becoming a Black Widow and having personal connections to terror networks. In other words, recruitment of Black Widows usually occurs through friendships or familial relationships. Approximately, twenty seven percent of Black Widows were married or had personal connections to terrorists before becoming terrorists themselves. Further, Black Widows had similar prior experiences before becoming terrorists. These prior experiences include losing close family members that resulted from conflicts with the Russian forces.

Although Chechen suicide bombers do not have personality disorders prior to becoming terrorists, research shows that they have deep personal trauma, which leads them to embrace terrorist ideologies causing them to join the Black Widows. Furthermore, Chechens believe it is ethically correct to take revenge if one's loved one has died. Another perspective of how Black Widows form is that after traumatic events, people in general, not just Chechen women, tend to turn to extreme religious views to form a sense of identity and belonging. Thus, jihadist ideologies provides this medium for Chechen women who experienced extreme post traumatic experiences thus transforming them into Black Widows. Combined with personal trauma, cultural responsibility for social justice, and extreme religious viewpoints to take revenge, these factors mold Chechen women to become Black Widows.

== Motives ==
There have been claims by Yulia Yuzik, a Russian journalist and author of Brides of Allah, that many of the women who have been sold by their parents are used as shahidkas, while others have been kidnapped or tricked. She also claims that many have been prepared to be suicide bombers through narcotics and rape. Several were pregnant at the time. Besayev, who is a leader of the Chechen independence movement and a terrorist, also argued that women are trained for their missions. In addition, Michael Radu argued that these women are specifically trained for suicide attacks. On the other hand, independent journalists including Robert W. Kurz and Charles K. Bartles reject this view, stating that in most cases female Chechen suicide bombers do not fit this model. Mostly, female terrorists are given no training at all in preparation for the suicides as no weapon skill is needed to strap on the explosives. Many do not even blow themselves up, but are blown up by remote controls.

Additionally, some Black Widows have brothers or close relatives who were killed in one of the two Chechen wars between Russia and Islamist rebels since 1994 or in clashes with Russian-backed forces. These women may be driven by grievances or they may feel it is the only option to get their viewpoint seen. Kurz and Bartles offer another view of Black Widows' motives, arguing that these women are much more motivated by revenge, despair, and their drive for an independent state than by religious fundamentalism or individual honor. They may feel that terrorism is a strategy when there is no peaceful outlet to affect politics or that it is the only option for people with extremist views. Black Widows may be driven by the idea of Chechnya gaining independence from Russia or they may have joined the terrorist movement because they were brainwashed and needed a sense of belonging when they were in a state of political turmoil. The Black Widows rarely do interviews, so very little is known about their lives.

After the Dubrovka theater attack, hostages gave mixed reports about what motivates the Black Widows. During the attack, some female suicide bombers reportedly told hostages how their family members had been killed in the war and they felt they had nothing left, thus, they were motivated by family connections. Other hostages reported that some of the Black Widows only talked about the Koran, had extremist viewpoints, and were hard to reason with. A majority of Black Widows are uneducated which may be the result of these extreme perspectives. This also suggests that Black Widows may be driven by ideals about religion or may be out of touch with reality, and brainwashed by the men in their lives to join the cause.

== Media depictions ==
The media depicts the female suicide bombers in two main ways, as motivated by the deaths of men in her life or as in a situation of hopelessness where she is forced into terrorism to get her voice heard. Both the Russian government and Chechen groups portrayed the Black Widows in these ways to support their respective positions. Chechen terrorist leaders emphasized women as victims to humanize the Russian-Chechen Conflict. Media coverage tends to show the female terrorists motives as emotional, such as due to loss of a relative, rather than ideological or political, such as gaining independence from Russia. The New York Times reported on Chechnya and Russia between 1994 and 2004 during the peak of the conflict; its reports often questioned and speculated why women would join the Chechen terrorist groups and largely did not interview the Chechen's involved in the cause. A common media narrative about the Chechen Black Widows is that they joined due to family connections; because they were following men or avenging the deaths of their husbands. Women may also be portrayed as being a terrorist for 'the sake of love'; meaning they join because they have a personal connection to the organization, such as a husband or a boyfriend in the organization. This narrative describes the female terrorists as feminine and passive because they are following the men in their lives to join the terrorist organization. On the other hand, women may also be depicted as tough as a man and given more masculine qualities; and the media may question her feminine qualities.

In 1994, the Russian press began to note rumors of female suicide bombers and female snipers; these rumors were proven credible due to the occasional arrests and the known involvement of women in the attacks during the Russian-Chechen Conflict. On November 29, 2001, journalists reported the attempted assassination of General Gadzhiyez by a suicide bomber attack This attack received relatively little attention from the western press, but may have been the first Black Widow attack. On October 23, 2002, the female terrorists gained international media attention when they seized the Dubrovka Theater. During this attack, female terrorists were filmed and interviewed by the press. This is one of the first times the Black Widows had a voice in the media.

== Notable attacks ==
- The main perpetrator Khava Barayeva is considered first known ‘Black Widow’. She is the cousin of the well-known field commander warlord Arbi Barayev and sister of Movsar Barayev, head of the Moscow commando. She and Luisa Magomadova were the first to attack and became known as the “Black Widows”. Before her attack Khava Barayeva made a martyr video. In the video, Khava Barayeva claimed she was attacking for Chechen independence and tried to spread the message to others to do the same. On June 6, 2000, Khava Barayeva, who was only 17 years old, and Luisa Magomadova drove a truck of explosives at a checkpoint of Omon, a base named Alkhan-Yurt. Barayeva detonated the bombs, with official sources claiming two people were killed and five people were injured.
- Medna Bayrokova, a resident of Grozny, said that she remembers the day a middle aged woman came to her front door asking to speak to her 26-year-old daughter, Zareta Bayrokova, who was a tuberculosis patient. Bayrokova let the woman in. Her daughter spent an hour in her bedroom with the woman, before leaving the house. Zareta Bayrokova died in the attack on the Dubrovka Theater in Moscow in 2002. Of the 41 terrorists in the attack on the Dubrovka theater 19 were female. The terrorists held around 800 people hostage at the theater for 3 days, until Russian forces regained control of the building.
- In May 2003, Shakhida Baimuratova, a suicide bomber, killed 16 people and wounded 150 in an assassination attempt on then Moscow-appointed Chechen president Akhmad Kadyrov at a crowded Muslim festival in Ilishkan Yurt. A second woman bomber was also present but killed only herself.
- On 5 June 2003, a woman detonated a bomb in a bus carrying Russian Air Force pilots in North Ossetia, killing twenty (besides herself) and injuring 14.
- On 5 July 2003, two suicide bombers killed 16 people and injured six others at a rock concert at Tushino Airfield in Moscow.
- In December 2003, a male and female suicide bomber killed 46 people and injured 100 others by detonating explosives on a packed commuter train, which had just left Yessentuki in Southern Russia. The woman is believed to have carried explosives in a bag, whereas the man had grenades strapped to his leg.
- On 9 December 2003, a bomb exploded outside the Hotel National, Moscow just a few hundred metres from the Moscow Kremlin. It is thought that the target was the State Duma building and that the bomb had detonated prematurely. Six people died and 13 were injured in the blast. The suicide bomber was later identified as Khadishat Mangeriyeva.
- On 6 February 2004, Georgi Trofimov, a Russian bomb disposal officer, was killed as he tried to defuse a device at a Moscow cafe. The failed bomber, ethnic Ingush Zarema Muzhakhoyeva, was sentenced to 20 years of imprisonment for terrorism in April 2004. In 2005, she participated in the trial of the Beslan hostage crisis terrorist Nur-Pashi Kulayev as a witness for the prosecution, but she withdrew all her statements about Kulayev that she made in pre-trial depositions and said she didn't know he was a militant.
- Two Russian passenger aircraft disasters in 2004 are believed to have been the work of the Black Widows. The smaller of the planes, a TU-134 which crashed near Tula, had been carrying a Chechen woman called Amanat Nagayeva who had bought her ticket just an hour before the flight took off. The larger plane exploded near the city of Rostov killing 46 people. Among the wreckage, investigators found traces of hexogen, a powerful explosive. Another Chechen woman, Satsita Djerbikhanova, was also a last-minute passenger on this flight.
- The Beslan School Siege started on Wednesday, September 1, 2004, during the day of knowledge, which is a holiday that celebrates school starting. Because of this holiday, there were many children including parents in a school in Beslan, North Ossetia. At 9:30 AM, 34 terrorists stormed the school, including two female suicide bombers, taking more than one thousand hostages. On the first day, all of the hostages were taken to the school's gym. There were more than a thousand hostages including parents, children, and teachers. The attackers then separated the adults that seemed the strongest, about fifteen to twenty people, into a corridor, where explosions occurred shortly after. The explosions were the result of the female suicide bombers. Negotiations started with the terrorists and with an individual named Leonid Rosha, a pediatrician. Ultimately, negotiations failed. On the second day, Russia's president, Vladimir Putin made the public statement that, what is most important is the life of the hostages. Negotiations kept occurring, but none of them seemed successful. On the last day of the siege, two bombs detonated killing many hostages instantly, however, some of the hostages took this chance to flee. Russian forces also took this chance to move in into the school. In the process of all of this, the roof collapsed killing more than a hundred hostages. In the end, some of the terrorists were killed and some were captured alive. Because of this incident, more than 330 people were killed and about 700 people were wounded. Two Chechen women suicide bombers, Roza Nagayeva and Mairam Taburova, were involved.
- On 29 March 2010, nearly 40 people were killed and another 100 injured when two suicide bombers detonated explosives at two stations of the Moscow subway, the Park Kultury metro station and at the Lubyanka station. The attacks were linked to shahidkas by the Russian Government, although an investigation has yet to be undertaken. One of the perpetrators was Dagestani-born Dzhennet Abdurakhmanova (1992–2010), the widow of 30-year-old Umalat Magomedov who was killed by Russian forces on 31 December 2009.
- On 24 January 2011, 35 were killed and 180 wounded in Domodedovo, Russia's busiest airport. Although the identity of those responsible for carrying out the attacks has not been officially confirmed, initial reports suggested that at least one Black Widow was involved, likely accompanied by a man.
- On 7 March 2012, a widow of a militant killed on 10–11 February 2012 near a village, Karabudakhkent, 40 km (24 miles) south of Dagestan capital Makhachkala, killed herself and five police officers and wounded two others in Karabudakhkent.
- On 28 August 2012, Sufi leader Said Afandi and six other people were killed in a suicide bomb attack in Dagestan. The attack was allegedly perpetrated by Russian Aminat Kurbanova who had converted to Islam. Her two former spouses were Islamic militants, and her third husband also believed to be a militant.
- On 25 May 2013, a female suicide bomber, Madina Alieva, blew herself up in Dagestan, injuring at least 18. She was the widow of an Islamist killed in 2009.
- On 21 October 2013, a female suicide bomber, Naida Asiyalova, blew up a Volgograd bus, killing six of the forty passengers.
- On 29 December 2013, a female suicide bomber killed 16 people at a train station in Volgograd.

== See also ==
- Shaheeda
