= Children of Beslan =

2005 film

Children of Beslan is a 2005 documentary film about the Beslan school siege directed by Ewa Ewart and Leslie Woodhead for the BBC. In the United States the documentary aired on HBO. Tony Perry of the Los Angeles Times stated that the film recounts survivors' testimonies and does not explore political aspects nor assign blame to any party.

== History ==
Ewart went to Beslan in November 2004 to compile footage for the film, interviewing 140 subjects, all children who were held prisoner in the incident. Adults were not interviewed. Ewart, who had previously covered wars as a journalist, stated that "no amount of war-zone coverage proved to me as traumatic as making this film." In May 2009 Ewart went back to Beslan to do follow-up coverage.

The footage alternates between interviews and primary source material. The documentary does not use narration, nor does it depict the voices of interviewers. It has inter-titles to show the chronology of the siege.

Brian Lowry of Variety wrote that it was "chillingly effective in driving these horrific events home" but that it was exploiting its interviewees and "in most ways inferior to" a documentary on Beslan by Wide Angle. Dana Sevens of Slate gave a positive review.
