= Zarema Muzhakhoyeva =

Chechen-Ingush failed suicide bomber

- Зарема Мужахоева
- Born: 1980 (age 44–45); Chechen–Ingush ASSR, Soviet Union

Zarema Muzhakhoyeva (also transliterated as Muzhikhoeva; Russian: Зарема Мужахоева; born 1980) is an Ingush woman and would-be shahidka (female suicide bomber) who surrendered to Moscow police on July 9, 2003, instead of blowing herself up. Before being sent to Moscow, Muzhakhoyeva also failed a mission to attack a bus with the Russian Air Force personnel in Mozdok, North Ossetia, and lived in the house of Nur-Pashi Kulayev in Ingushetia.

Later, an FSB bomb disposal expert, Maj. Georgy Trofimov, was killed while attempting to defuse Muzhakhoyeva's devices.

Muzhakhoyeva was put in the high-security Lefortovo Prison and agreed to become an informant for the FSB; later, she also gave several interviews to the Russian media. Despite her full cooperation with the FSB, which led to several arrests and killings of Riyad-us Saliheen members in Moscow and Chechnya, her young age, and her lack of previous criminal record, in April 2004 she was found guilty of all charges including terrorism and sentenced to 20 years in a prison camp on demand of the jury, which did not find any extenuating circumstances in her case. Her appeal to the Russian Supreme Court was also rejected.

Muzhakhoyeva later told a Russian newspaper she had turned to terrorism after her husband was killed in a business dispute and she had stolen jewelry from her grandparents and been frozen out by relatives.
