= Banalia =

Banalia may refer to:

- Banalia, a genus of plants, synonym of Croton
- Banalia Territory, in the Democratic Republic of the Congo

== See also ==
- Benalia
