= Avda =

Avda may refer to:

- Avda (given name), a Russian male first name
- AVdA, abbreviation of Alternative Greens, a group merged into Autonomy Liberty Participation Ecology, a regionalist political party in Italy
- American Veterinary Distributors Association (AVDA), one of the organizations that made appointments to the Health Industry Business Communications Council, a standard-setting organization for healthcare bar coding
