= Avdonin =

Avdonin (Russian: Авдонин; masculine) or Adonina (Russian: Авдонина; feminine) is a Russian last name. Variants of this last name include Avdokhin/Avdokhina (Авдохин/Авдохина), Avdoshin/Avdoshina (Авдошин/Авдошина), Avdyunin/Avdyunina (Авдюнин/Авдюнина), and Avdyushin/Avdyushina (Авдюшин/Авдюшина).

They all derive from the Russian given names Avdey (or its rare form Avdon) (male)—meaning servant, servile—and Yevdokiya (or its form Avdotya) (female)—meaning benevolence, acceptance, goodwill.

People with the last name

- Alexander Avdonin (1932–2026), the first known person to start exhuming the grave of the murdered royal Romanov family
- Juri Avdonin, Estonian association football player for Tartu JK Welco Elekter
- Tatiana Avdonina, Belarusian water skier, 2000 trick cable ski champion
- Yelena Avdonina, librarian, casualty of the 2004 Beslan school hostage crisis

Fictional characters

- Avdonina, a character from the 1991 movie Khishchniki; played by Svetlana Nemolyaeva
