= Magomed Khashiev =

Ingush militant (1977–2004)

Magomed Khamitovich Khashiev (Russian: Магомед Хамитович Хашиев; 4 October 1977 – 10 October 2004), also known as Sokhib (Russian: Сахиб) and Khattab (Russian: Хаттаб), was the Ingush Emir of the Sunzhensky District and a militant in the Russian federal subjects of Ingushetia and Chechnya. He was connected with dozens of terrorist acts, including an attempt on the life of the President of Ingushetia, Murat Zyazikov. He was also one of the masterminds behind the Beslan school siege in September 2004.

== Terrorist activity ==
Khashiev, an emir of the wahhabi jamaat of the Sunzhensky region, joined gangs of Kazbek Turazhiev and Batyr Ozdoev gangs. Khashiev started his terrorist activities after he had been trained as a fighter in a Khattab's camp on the outskirts of Serzhen-Yurt, Shali region, Chechnya. The terrorist was the mastermind behind subversive-terrorist actions. He was implicated in a car bombing in September 2003 by the Office of the Federal Security Service for the Republic of Ingushetia. He had his hand in the explosion that occurred on the Nazran-Moscow train in October 2003 as well as in the terrorist attacks on the Caucasus road running through the region bordering the North Ossetia-Alania Republic. His accomplices murdered 3 MOI officers in Ingushetia three months ago.

Khashiev wore a Shakhid belt when travelling in Chechnya and Ingushetia. However he enjoyed no respect of the Sunzhensky jamaat's rank-and-file members as he was arrogant and had pocketed money allocated by foreign extremist organisations. Rebels who have been detained in Chechnya or Ingushetia say M. Khashiev had sexual liaisons with Abu-Dzeid, a notorious Arab mercenary who headed a gang operating in Ingushetia and followed instructions of Abu al-Valid and S. Basaev.

== Death ==
As part of a special operation to eliminate active gang members closely linked to Shamil Basaev, Magomed Khashiev and his distant relative Said-Magomed Khashiev were killed in a skirmish on October 10, 2004, when the law enforcement attacked a house in Nazran, Ingushetia, where three active gang members were hiding. The rebels offered armed resistance, two of them (including Khashiev) were killed in retaliatory fire, and one was apprehended.
