= Beslan: The Tragedy of School No. 1 =

2008 book by Tim Phillips

- Author: Tim Phillips
- Genre: Non-fiction
- Publisher: Granta Books
- Publication date: 2008

Beslan: The Tragedy of School No. 1 is a 2008 book written by Timothy "Tim" Phillips and published by Granta Books. It discusses the Beslan school siege of 2004.

This was Phillips's first book. Phillips stated that residents of Beslan initially had a negative attitude towards him as they did towards other journalists, but that their attitudes improved.

The book describes the history of the North Caucasus and the siege itself.

== Reception ==
Andrey Kurkov wrote in The Guardian that Beslan is "such an important work for any reader who wishes to understand what is happening in the North Caucasus" due to the "frankness" of the interview subjects.

Kirkus Reviews describes it as "A disturbing account of fundamentalism’s lethal power."

Publishers Weekly stated "Phillips's debut is an admirable record of a tragedy rapidly being forgotten."
