= Ewa Ewart =

Polish film director (born 1956)

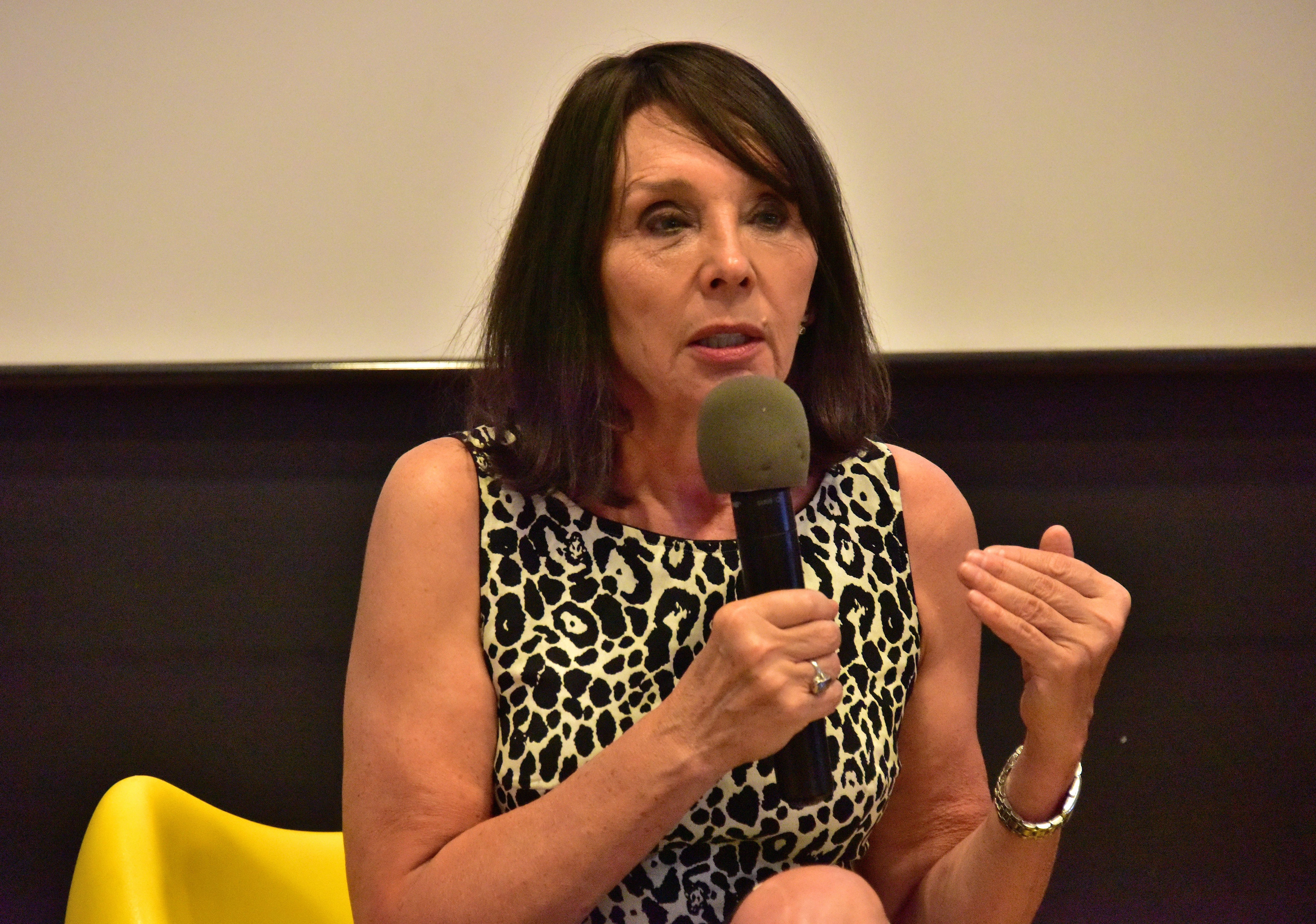
Ewa Ewart (2019).

Ewa Ewart (born 13 March 1956 in Warsaw) is a Polish journalist and an award-winning filmmaker who specializes in groundbreaking and influential documentaries.

== Early life ==
She was born and raised in Warsaw, Poland, but she has spent most of her career based at the BBC TV in London, England.

Ewa Ewart is a graduate of the University of Warsaw with a degree in Spanish language and culture.

== Career ==
In the early 1980s she worked as a translator and a reporter for the Spanish news agency EFE in its Warsaw bureau.

After leaving the country in the mid-1980s, she continued her work for EFE in London, UK.

In the years 1985–1990, she was based in Washington, D.C., where she was a reporter for the BBC World Service, Polish Section, and a freelance producer for some international TV networks based in Washington, D.C. (in the United States, avoiding repetition of Washington, D.C.)

In 1990 she moved to Moscow, where she worked as a news producer for the American television network CBS in the Moscow Bureau.

In 1993 she returned to Great Britain and began her career as a producer and director for the BBC TV Current Affairs Department. She worked for flagships international documentary programs such as Assignment, Correspondent and This World.

She has traveled and worked in many countries of the world, producing and directing programs ranging from investigations and political and social observational documentaries.

Ewa Ewart has been a freelancer since 2012. She works on a regular basis for TVN24 and TVN24Bis, American owned commercial channels in Poland, where she is the presenter of an international documentary strand.

== Filmography ==
Year	Title	Description
1998	ETA - Coming in from the Cold	This 45-minute documentary tells the story of the Basque separatist organization ETA and its 30-year struggle for the region's independence.
1998	Smile of History	This documentary forms one part of the series Absolute Truth which examines the history of a Catholic church after the Second Vatican Council.
1999	Icebreaker	The film returns to Eastern Europe to see if the series of revolutions in the late 80s did indeed transform the world and lead to the fulfillment of the strong hopes of freedom.
1999	The General and the Boxer	The story of a struggle for political influence which reveals the mechanism of corruption during the process of privatization during the early stage of post-Soviet Russia.
2000	No Experience Necessary	An investigative documentary that reveals illegal practices of the sex trade. It begins in Latvia and leads to Denmark, Ireland, and the U.K.
2000	The Cocaine War	The film tells the story of the civil war in Columbia. It features an exclusive interview with Carlos Castano, then a leader of a right wing paramilitary organization.
2001	Who is Putin?	The documentary presents an intimate portrait of Vladimir Putin, then a little known political figure, who became the new Russian president.
2001	Dead Men Tell No Tales	This documentary investigates some of the cases of killings committed by the Jamaican police in the late 1990s and early 2000s.
2002	Killing the Story	An investigative documentary for the first time reveals the story of one of the murders in post-communist Ukraine through the testimony of some of its key figures.
2003	Russia - Poison City	An intimate portrait of a city whose notoriety as the most polluted spot on earth ensured it was included in the Guinness World Records Book.
2004	Access to Evil	This documentary reveals for the first time how the regime of North Korea is testing chemical weapons on political prisoners in a secret network of prisons.
2005	Children of Beslan	A documentary which tells a story of children who survived a terrorist attack on their school in Beslan in September 2004. The child survivors talk of those harrowing days of the siege and how they have tried to rebuild their lives.
2006	Japan - Retired Husband Syndrome	This documentary looks into a new condition, which is spreading in Japan. A doctor who discovered it, christened it the Retired Husband Syndrome.
2007	Mystery Flights	An investigative documentary which exposes for the first time details of the secret and illegal program, under which those suspected of terrorism were transported and held in undisclosed CIA prisons, outside of US borders.
2009	Children of Beslan. 5 Years On	The documentary revisits the child survivors of a terrorist attack on their school in Beslan in September 2004 and shows how they have coped with the trauma of the attack.
2011	In Silence	The film goes back to a fatal plane crash on April 10th 2010 and examines its impact on the political and social life in Poland.
2011	Gorbachev - A Man Who Changed The World	A two-part documentary, which takes a look at Mikhail Gorbachev's life and political career and asks how this product of Soviet Communism ended up as its destroyer.
2011	Reclaim the City	A document commemorating the Warsaw Uprising. 70 years later, some of the last remaining insurgents and civilians, who were caught up in the horrors of the 63 days of fighting, share their memories and experiences.
2014	Red Gold - The Inside Story of Poland's Biggest Copper	The inside story of the largest transaction in the history of the Polish economy - the acquisition of the Canadian Company Quadra FNX by KGHM, Poland's biggest copper producer.
2018	The Curse of Abundance	This documentary reveals the full drama of the failed Yasuni initiative, which has far-reaching global as well as regional repercussions. The story of Yasuni and the revolutionary idea proposed by Ecuador to leave part of its crude in the ground in exchange for international financial compensation, has become a microcosm of some of the most pressing environmental issues on the planet.
2019	We The People	This documentary explores the Western perspective on the last 30 years of Polish history since the momentous partially free parliamentary elections and examines the role that the United States played in the transformation process in Poland.

== Awards and recognition ==
- 1998: BAFTA nomination for ETA - Coming in From the Cold.
- 2000: Premis Actual International Award - No Experience Necessary.
- 2004: Access to Evil RTS (Royal Television Society) Award, Amnesty International Award, The Foreign Press Association Award, CINE Award, Golden Globe Award and Grand Prix Golden Globe.
- 2005/2006: Children of Beslan BAFTA Nomination, Double Emmy nomination (Best Director and Best Camera), Amnesty International Nomination. Two RTS Awards (categories: Best Documentary and Best Journalism), FIPA Award, CINE Award, Peabody Award, BANFF Award, One World Award.
- 2009: Andrzej Wojciechowski Award in recognition for her documentaries series.
- 2009: Nominated for Grand Press Award, Poland - Journalist of the Year.
- 2010: Received the Wiktor Award, Poland - for the Best TV Programme.
- 2011: Nominated for Grand Press Award, Poland - Journalist of the Year.
- 2012: Winner of the Wiktor Award, Poland - for the Best TV Programme.
- 2014: Winner of MediaTory – annual Award given by Polish Students of Journalism.
- 2014: Red Gold: The Inside Story of Poland’s Biggest Copper Deal Winner of Silver Globe, World Media Festival in Hamburg, Germany.
- 2014: Winner of Outstanding Personality of the Year – European Business Forum.
- 2015: Winner of Jerzy Zimowski Award- Poland's Institute of Public Affairs.
- 2017: Winner of MediaTory - Authority of the Year - annual prize awarded by Polish Students of Journalism.
- 2020: Winner of the Honorary Award of Polish Human Rights Commissioner "For Services to the Protection of Human Rights". Winner of the Amnesty International Poland Lifetime Award in the Media for Human Rights
