= Vladimir Khodov =

Russian hostage taker (1976–2004)

Vladimir Anatolievich Khodov (Note: Russian: Владимир Анатольевич Ходов; Iron Ossetic: Ладымер Анатолий фырт Ходты) (né Samoshkin; 9 October 1976 – 3 September 2004) was a leader of the hostage-takers in the 2004 Beslan school hostage crisis in which more than 300 people, including many children, were killed.

== Early life ==
Khodov was born in the Ukrainian town of Berdyansk. His mother, Оleksandra Samoshkina, was a nurse, and his father's identity is unknown. When he was three years old, Vladimir's mother married a North Ossetian military engineer, Anatoly Khodov, and moved to Elkhotovo, 40 km from Beslan, where she worked in the maternity ward of a hospital.

After separating from her husband, Aleksandra moved with her sons to Beslan. According to some sources both sons attended the Beslan School Number One that was later the subject of the attack (Vladimir was known as Samoshkin there). Other sources do not confirm this information.

In 1996, his brother Borik was sentenced to eight years imprisonment in Maykop for murder, following a stabbing incident in the village. While in prison, he converted to Islam. On one of his visits to his brother in Maykop, Vladimir was accused of a rape, and left Russia to live with his grandfather in Berdyansk.

== Later life ==
According to police records made public after the Beslan incident, after his return from Ukraine, Khodov converted to Islam in Adygea, went to a madrassa in Cherkessia and even joined the Chechen insurgence (serving mostly as a cook). He served under Ruslan Gelayev and later Iles Gorchikhanov. Vladimir again moved out at the end of 2002, asking his mother and stepfather to care for his cat "Dima" while he was absent.

In 2003, Borik was released from prison a year before his sentence was completed. Borik returned to Elkhotovo, and on July 1 he abducted Sveta Gabisova, a girl he had known earlier, claiming he was in love and wanted to marry her, despite her protests. Relatives rescued Sveta, and her brother Iriston visited Borik to complain about his behaviour - during the resulting fight, Borik was shot and killed. Vladimir returned for the funeral on 22 July but interrupted the funeral to take the body away for a Muslim burial. His disturbance caught the attention of the authorities, and after hiding in a local cleric's basement, he was arrested. Despite being a wanted criminal, Vladimir was released by the police shortly after. Shamil Basayev claimed this was when Vladimir was given the choice of prison or helping to infiltrate the Chechen warlord's movement.

According to police records, Khodov had already joined the "Taliban" training camp in Galashki (Ingushetia), and returned to it after his release. On 3 February 2004 an exploding 122 mm artillery shell in Vladikavkaz killed an army cadet and a nearby female. By 21 February Vladimir had been declared the prime suspect, after being caught on videotape.

In Elkhotovo, an arsenal of weapons was found at the home of another convert and Vladimir's picture and code name (Abdullah) appeared on the FSB "Wanted" Internet Pages. A failed (and victimless) bomb attack on the Moscow to Vladikavkaz train near the Elkhotovo railway station in May 2004 was also blamed on Vladimir Khodov.

== Siege ==
On the second day of the Beslan siege, Khodov reportedly stopped one of the other hostage-takers from killing a hostage named Larisa Kudzieva, and offered to free her two children if she agreed to wear an explosive belt and hijab in exchange; an offer which Kudzieva refused.

During the siege, authorities got Khodov's mother, Aleksandra, to phone her son, hoping she could convince him to let the children go free.

== After the attack ==
After the siege, there were rumours that he had survived and had been captured, died in custody, or had committed suicide in prison.

After the attacks, his mother Oleksandra was taken into custody by the FSB although exonerated of wrongdoing. She was evicted from Beslan in absentia and went to live in Vladikavkaz.
