= Kamel Rabat Bouralha =

British man accused of terrorism

Kamel Rabat Bouralha (born c.1958) is an Algerian-born British citizen who has been accused by the Federal Security Service of the Russian Federation (FSB) of being a key aide to Chechen rebel warlord Shamil Basayev in organizing the Beslan school hostage crisis.

Russian investigators claim that Bouralha travelled from London to Chechnya in 2001. Former associates of the Scotland Yard in London confirmed that Bouralha had lived in London and had been a frequent visitor at Finsbury Park mosque in 2000. He was reportedly detained in September 2004 in Chechnya as he attempted to flee to Azerbaijan to treat a bullet wound in his chest.
