= Avdakt =

Avdakt (Russian: Авда́кт) is a Russian Christian male first name. It is possibly derived from the Serbian Muslim word Abdaga (Abdul-aga), meaning master's slave, slave of an elder relative. Its colloquial form is Avda (А́вда).

"Avdakt" is also a colloquial form of the male first name Adavkt.
