= City of Angels =

City of Angels may refer to:

== Places ==
- Angeles City
- Angelópolis, Colombia
- Angels Camp, California, a city in Calaveras County, California, United States
- Arkhangelsk, a city in Russia
- Bangkok, Thailand, whose abbreviated Thai name Krung Thep literally means "Capital city (of) Angels"
- City of Angels (Beslan), cemetery in Beslan, Russia
- Kiryat Malakhi, a city in Southern District, Israel
- Los Angeles, California, United States, widely nicknamed "City of Angels" ("the angels" is the literal translation in Spanish of "Los Ángeles")
- Puebla (city), Mexico, formerly known as Puebla de los Ángeles, and popularly known as Ciudad de los Ángeles or Angelópolis (City of the Angels)
  - Angelópolis (Puebla), a commercial and residential area in the city
- Toruń, Poland, name comes from city coat of arms, which includes the Angel

== Film, soundtracks and stage ==
- City of Angels (film), a 1998 American film starring Meg Ryan and Nicolas Cage
  - City of Angels (soundtrack), the soundtrack for the 1998 film
- The Crow: City of Angels, a 1996 American film starring Vincent Perez and Iggy Pop
- City of Angels (musical), a musical comedy which ran on Broadway from 1989 to 1992

== Music ==
=== Albums ===
- City of Angels (The Miracles album), 1975
- City of Angels, a 1988 album by Akiko Kobayashi
- City of Angels (Vanessa Amorosi album), 2022

=== Songs ===
- "City of Angels" (24kGoldn song), 2020
- "City of Angels" (Thirty Seconds to Mars song), 2013
- "City of Angels", by 10,000 Maniacs from In My Tribe, 1987
- "City of Angels", by Above the Law from the soundtrack for The Crow: City of Angels, 1996
- "City of Angels", by Demi Lovato from Holy Fvck, 2022
- "City of Angels", by The Distillers from their album Sing Sing Death House, 2002
- "City of Angels", by The Head and the Heart from their album Signs of Light, 2016
- "City of the Angels", by Journey from Evolution, 1979
- "City of Angels", by Miguel from War & Leisure, 2017
- "City of Angels", by Nik Kershaw from The Riddle, 1984
- "City of Angels", by Wang Chung from To Live and Die in L.A. (soundtrack), 1985

== Television ==
- City of Angels (1976 TV series), a short-lived television series starring Wayne Rogers as a private detective in 1930s Los Angeles on NBC
- City of Angels (2000 TV series), a short-lived medical drama set in modern-day Los Angeles on CBS in 2000
- "City of Angels" (Glee), an episode of Glee
- "City Of", the premiere episode of the TV series Angel, mislabeled "City of Angels" on some DVDs
- Penny Dreadful: City of Angels, 2020 American dark fantasy series

== Other uses ==
- City of Angels FC, a semi-professional soccer club based in Los Angeles, United States
