= Kamel Sidky =

Egyptian jurist and politician (1885–1946)

Minister of Finance
- In office May 1942 – 2 June 1943
- Prime Minister: Mustafa El Nahas
- Preceded by: Makram Ebeid
- Succeeded by: Amin Osman

Personal details
- Born: March 1885
- Died: 1946 (aged 60–61)
- Party: Wafd Party

Kamel Sedky (Arabic: كامل صدقي; 1885–1946) was an Egyptian lawyer. He was the minister of finance between 1942 and 1943.

== Early life and education ==
Sedky hailed from a Coptic family. He was born in March 1885.

== Career and activities ==
Sedky was a long-term vice president of the Egyptian National Bar. He was named as the head of the Bar in 1936. He was also a long-term member of the Coptic Community Council where he served until 1942. He was made a senator and was part of the Egyptian delegations in the International Parliamentary Congresses held in 1928 and in 1930.

Sedky joined the Wafd Party on 2 December 1932. He was made the vice president of the Egyptian Parliament in 1934. He was appointed minister of commerce and industry in February 1942 to the cabinet led by Mostafa El Nahas. Sedky was also named as the minister of finance in May 1942 when Makram Ebeid was removed from office. On the same date Sedky was awarded with the title Pasha. His both ministerial tenures ended in June 1943. Then he was appointed president of the State Audit on 2 June 1943. His succeeded Amin Osman in the post who in turn, succeeded Sedky as minister of finance. Sedky headed the State Audit until his retirement on 1 March 1945.

== Death ==
Sedky died in 1946.
