= Yacine Benalia =

Terorist born 1969-2004 due to the 2004 Beslan school attack

Personal details
- Born: 1969 Algeria
- Died: 8 March 2004 Chechnya

Military service
- Battles/wars: Second Chechen War

Yacine Benalia was an Algerian-born British citizen and Islamist militant who allegedly participated in the Beslan school hostage crisis in September 2004. Whether he truly participated is unclear, as he was also reported killed in Chechnya in March 2004, six months before the hostage drama in North Ossetia.

== Rebel activity ==
Benalia allegedly fled Algeria in the 1990s for London, where he eventually became a British citizen. According to Scotland Yard, he was a frequent visitor of the Finsbury Park Mosque, known at the time for the fiery jihadist preaching of Abu Hamza al-Masri. Benalia is said to have arrived in the North Caucasus in 2001 in order to battle Russian forces during the Second Chechen War.

== Death ==
While some reports suggest Benalia possibly died in the siege of the school in Beslan, it has also been reported that he - along with fellow Algerian militant Osman Larussi - was killed by Russian federal forces in Chechnya on 8 March 2004.
