= Avdelay =

Avdelay (Russian: Авдела́й) is an old and rare Russian Christian male first name. It is derived from the Greek: audē, lit. 'audio' and laos, 'people'.

The diminutive of "Avdelay" is Russian: А́вдя, romanized: Avdya.

The patronymics derived from "Avdelay" are Авдела́евич, Avdelayevich (masculine) and Авдела́евна, Avdelayevna (feminine).
