= Beslan school siege =

2004 Russian hostage crisis and massacre

- Part of terrorism in Russia, the Chechen–Russian conflict and the aftermath of the Second Chechen War
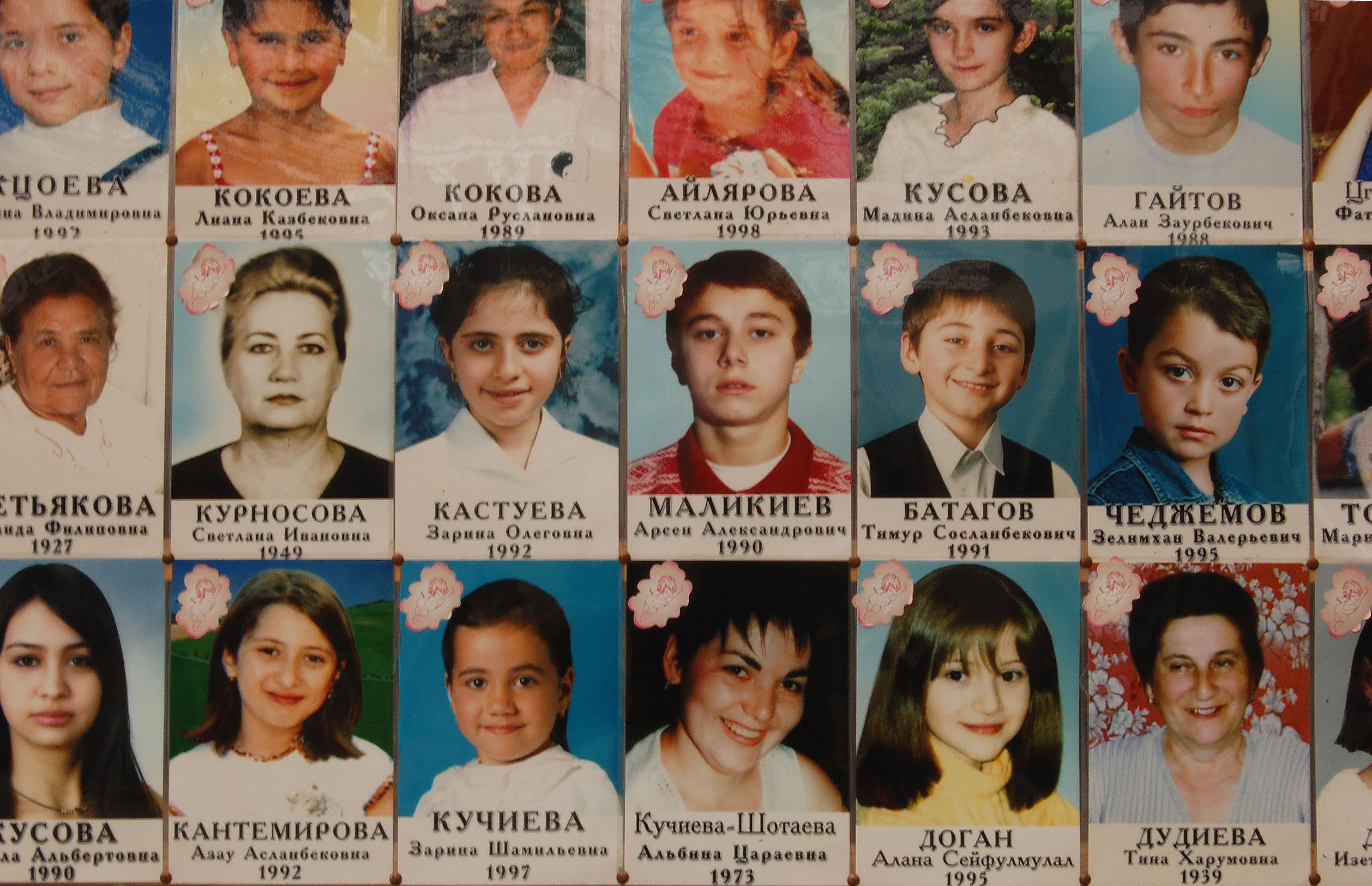
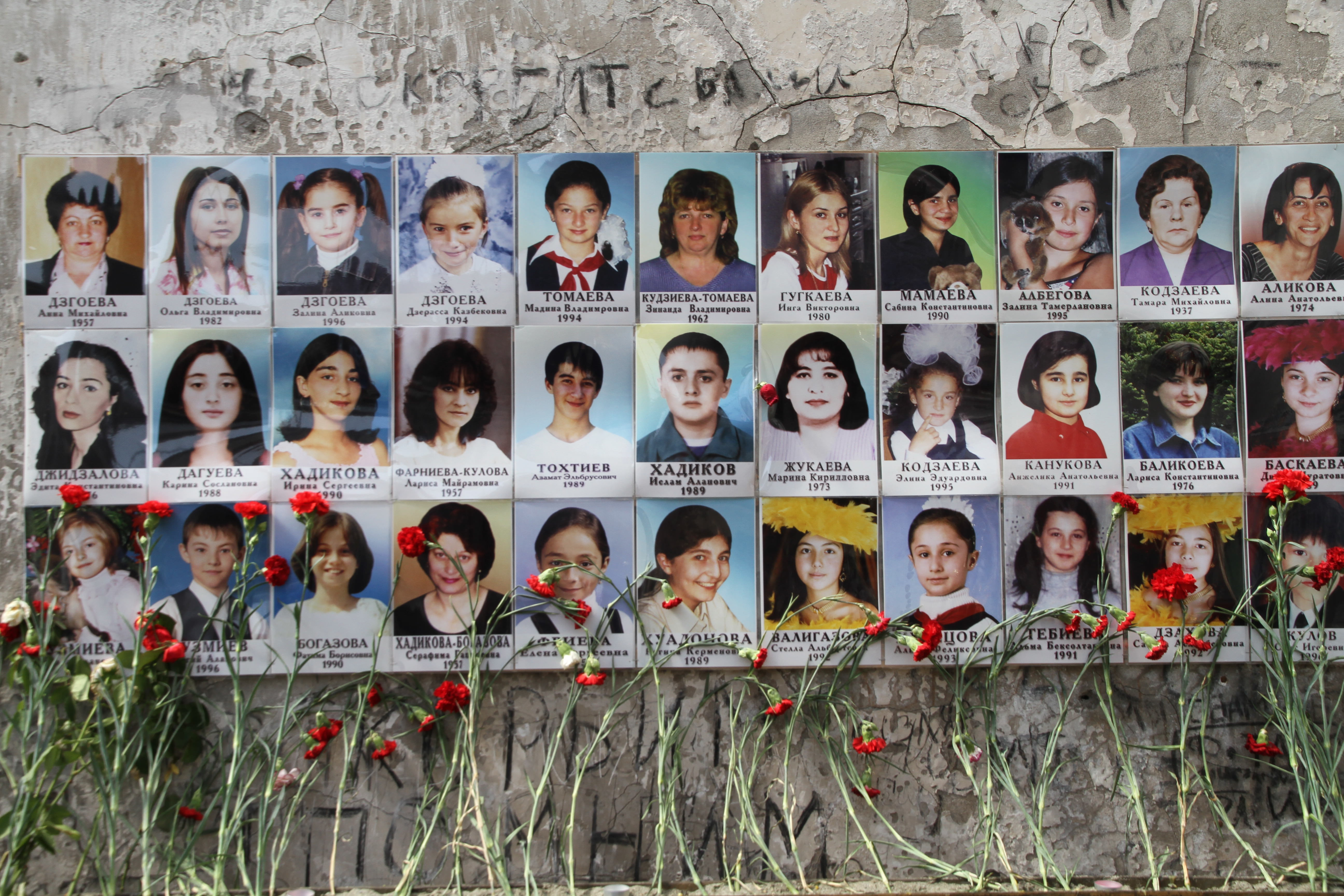
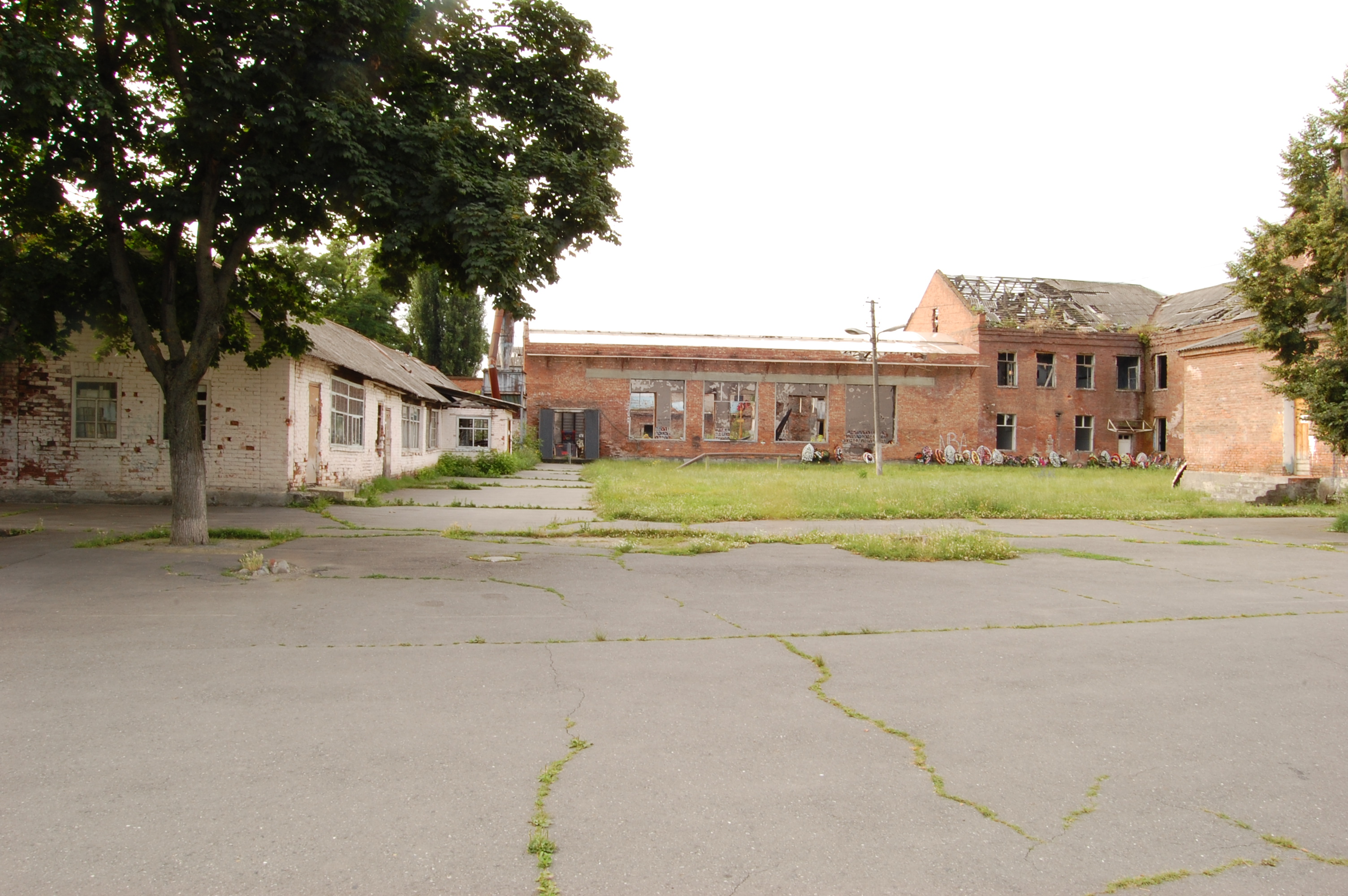
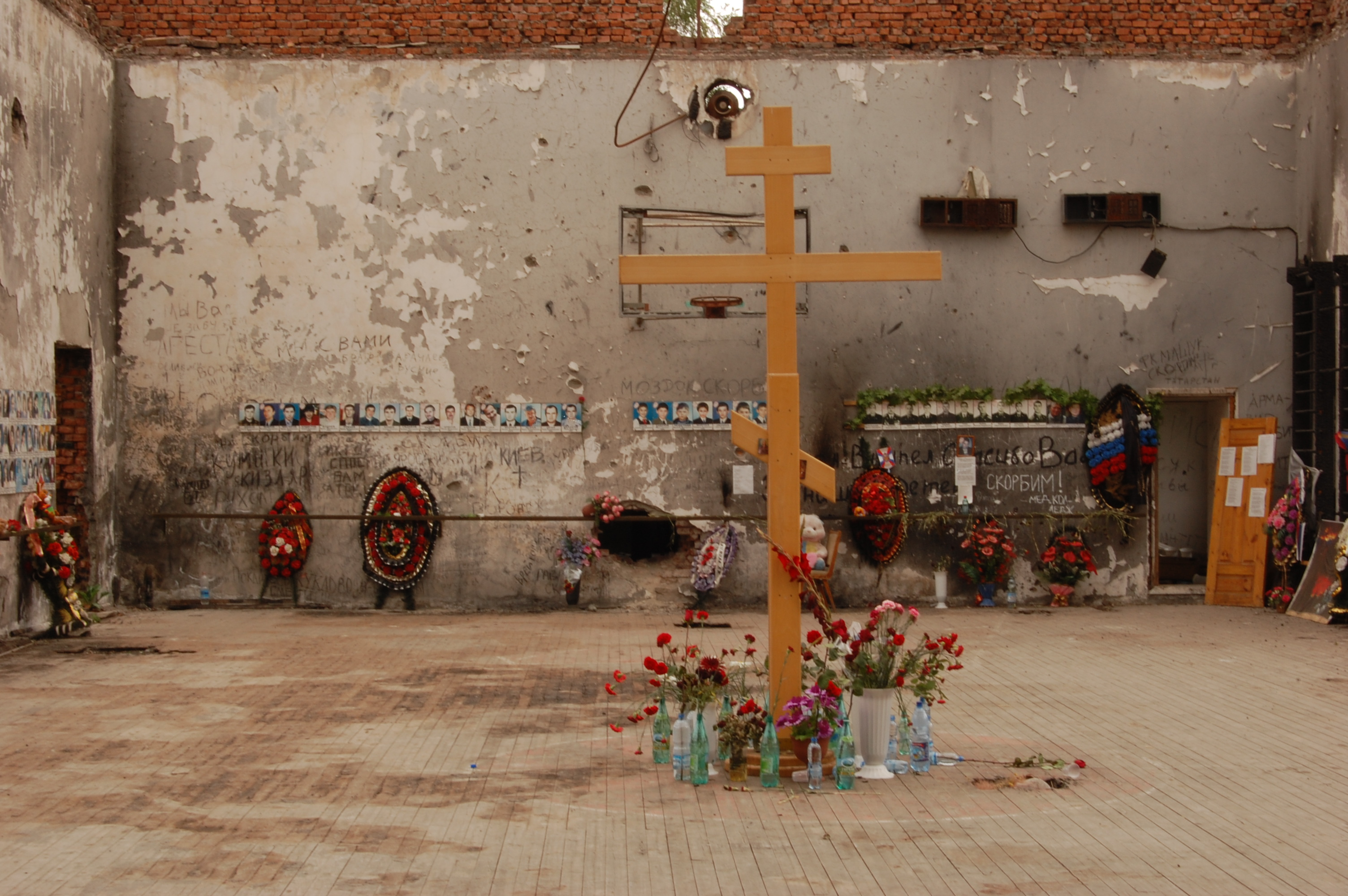
- From top left clockwise: photos of the victims, the Tree of Sorrow memorial cemetery, the Orthodox cross in the gymnasium in memory of the event, and the outside of school No. 1 in 2008.
- Native name: Теракт в Беслане; Бесланская трагедия
- Location: 43°11′3″N 44°32′27″E; Beslan, North Ossetia–Alania, Russia
- Date: 1–3 September 2004 (UTC+3)
- Target: School No. 1, Beslan
- Attack type: Mass murder, mass shooting, school shooting, suicide bombing, hostage-taking, siege, shootout
- Weapons: Assault rifles, suicide belts, improvised explosive devices
- Deaths: 334+ (186 children, excluding 31 attackers)
- Injuries: 800+
- Perpetrator: Riyad-us Saliheen Brigade
- No. of participants: At least 32
- Motive: See Motives and demands
- Convicted: Ruslan Khuchbarov – the leader of the militants who led the school takeover; Shamil Basayev – claimed responsibility; Vladimir Khodov – the last one identified by fingerprint examination; Abu Omar al-Kuwaiti – blew himself up during a clash with Russian forces; Magomed Khashiev – liquidated a month later; Ali Taziev (Magas) – maintained contact with terrorists, left the school building the day before the attack; Pavel Kosolapov - possible involvement

The Beslan school siege, also referred to as the Beslan terror attack, the Beslan tragedy, or the Beslan massacre, was an Islamist terrorist attack that occurred from 1 September 2004 to 3 September 2004 in Beslan, North Ossetia, Russia. It lasted three days, and involved the imprisonment of more than 1,100 people as hostages, including 777 children. The hostages, primarily children, their parents, and school staff were held by terrorists in a building rigged with explosives under severe conditions; the terrorists did not provide them with food or water and denied them other basic necessities. The siege ended with the deaths of 334 people, 186 of them children, as well as 31 of the attackers. It is considered the deadliest school shooting in history.

The crisis began when a group of armed terrorists occupied School Number One (SNO) in the town of Beslan, North Ossetia (a republic in the North Caucasus region of Russia), on 1 September 2004. The hostage-takers were members of the Riyad-us Saliheen, sent by the Chechen warlord Shamil Basayev, who demanded Russia withdraw from and recognize the independence of Chechnya. On the third day of the standoff, Russian security forces stormed the building.

Official accounts of the attack's motive broadly agree that it was executed to destabilize the North Caucasus and was Islamist in nature. Right after the conclusion of the attack, in a televised address, Vladimir Putin outlined the attack as a "direct intervention of international terror", and the federal parliamentary commission attributed it to Chechen separatists ordered by Shamil Basayev whose Riyad-us Saliheen Brigade claimed responsibility for the attack. Widespread evidence from victim testimonies identify the terrorists as an Islamist group, as terrorists shouted Allahu Akbar throughout the attacks and during hostage negotiation, Basayev ended his ransom note to Putin with the same words.

The event had security and political repercussions in Russia, leading to a series of federal government reforms consolidating power in the Kremlin and strengthening the powers of the President of Russia. Criticisms of the Russian government's management of the crisis have persisted, including allegations of disinformation and censorship in news media as well as questions about journalistic freedom, negotiations with the terrorists, allocation of responsibility for the eventual outcome and the use of excessive force.

== Background ==
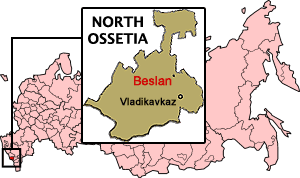
North Ossetia–Alania on a map of Russia

School No. 1 was one of seven schools in Beslan, a town of about 35,000 people in the Republic of North Ossetia–Alania in Russia's Caucasus. The school, located next to the district police station, housed approximately 60 teachers and more than 800 students. Its gymnasium, where most of the hostages were held for 52 hours, was a recent addition, measuring 10 metres (33 ft) wide and 25 metres (82 ft) long. There were reports that men disguised as repairmen had smuggled weapons and explosives into the school during July 2004, a fact that the authorities later denied; however, several witnesses have since testified they were forced to help their captors remove the weapons from caches hidden in the school. There were also claims that a "sniper's nest" on the sports-hall roof had been set up in advance.

== Course of the crisis ==
=== Day one ===
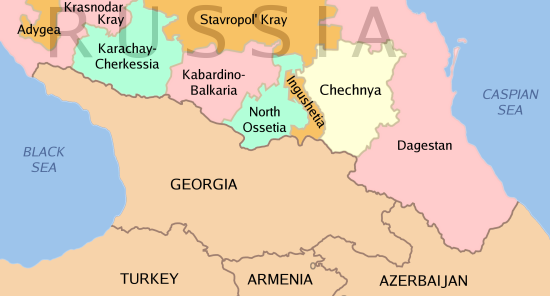
North Ossetia on a map of North Caucasus

The attack on the school began on 1 September, the traditional start of the Russian school year, referred to as "First Bell" or Knowledge Day. On this day, children, accompanied by their parents and other relatives, attend ceremonies hosted by their school. Because of the Knowledge Day festivities, the number of people in the schools was considerably higher than normal. Early in the morning, a group of several dozen heavily armed nationalist guerrillas left a forest encampment located in the vicinity of the village of Psedakh in the neighbouring Republic of Ingushetia, east of North Ossetia and west of war-torn Chechnya. The terrorists wore green military camouflage and black balaclava masks, and in some cases were also wearing explosive belts and explosive underwear. On the way to Beslan, on a country road near the North Ossetian village of Khurikau, they captured an Ingush police officer, Major Sultan Gurazhev. Gurazhev was left in a vehicle after the terrorists had reached Beslan and then ran toward the schoolyard and went to the district police department to inform them of the situation, adding that his duty handgun and badge had been taken.

At 09:11 local time, the terrorists arrived at Beslan in a GAZelle police van and a GAZ-66 military truck. Many witnesses and independent experts claim that there were two groups of attackers, and that the first group was already at the school when the second group arrived by truck. At first, some at the school mistook the militants for Russian special forces practicing a security drill. However, the attackers soon began shooting in the air and forcing everyone from the school grounds into the building. During the initial chaos, up to 50 people managed to flee and alert authorities about the situation. A number of people also managed to hide in the boiler room. After an exchange of gunfire against the police and an armed local civilian, in which reportedly one attacker was killed and two were wounded, the militants seized the school building. Reports of the death toll from this shootout ranged from two to eight people, while more than a dozen people were injured.

The attackers took approximately 1,100 hostages. The number of hostages was initially downplayed by the government to the 200–400 range, and then for an unknown reason announced to be exactly 354. In 2005, the government's total was put at 1,128. The militants herded their captives into the school's gym and confiscated all of their mobile phones under threat of death. They ordered the hostages to speak in Russian and only when first spoken to. When a father named Ruslan Betrozov stood to calm people and repeated the rules in the local language of Ossetic, a gunman approached him, asked Betrozov if he was done, and then shot him in the head. Another father named Vadim Bolloyev, who refused to kneel, was also shot by a captor and then bled to death. Their bodies were dragged from the sports hall, leaving a trail of blood later visible in the video made by the terrorists.

After gathering the hostages in the gym, the attackers singled out 15–20 adults who they thought were the strongest among the male teachers, school employees and fathers, and took them into a corridor next to the cafeteria on the second floor, where an explosive belt on one of the female bombers detonated, killing another female bomber (it was also claimed the second woman died from a bullet wound) and several of the selected hostages, as well as mortally injuring one male terrorist. The surviving hostages from this group were then ordered to lie down and were shot with an automatic rifle by another gunman; all but one of them were killed. Karen Mdinaradze, the FC Alania team cameraman, survived the explosion as well as the shooting; when discovered to be still alive, he was allowed to return to the sports hall, where he lost consciousness. The militants then forced other hostages to throw the bodies out of the building and to wash the blood off the floor. One of these hostages, Aslan Kudzayev, escaped by jumping out of the window; the authorities briefly detained him as a suspected terrorist.

==== Beginning of the siege ====
Overhead map of school showing initial positions of Russian forces

A security cordon was soon established around the school, consisting of the Russian police (militsiya), Internal Troops, Russian Army forces, Spetsnaz (including the elite Alpha and Vympel units of the Russian Federal Security Service (FSB)), and the OMON special units of the Russian Ministry of Internal Affairs (MVD). A line of three apartment buildings facing the school gym were evacuated and taken over by the special forces. The perimeter that they made was within 225 metres (738 ft) of the school, inside the range of the militants' grenade launchers. No firefighting equipment was in position and, despite the previous experiences of the 2002 Moscow theater hostage crisis, there were few ambulances ready. The chaos was worsened by the presence of Ossetian volunteer militiamen (opolchentsy) and armed civilians among the crowds who had gathered at the scene, altogether totaling perhaps as many as 5,000.

The attackers mined the gym and the rest of the building with improvised explosive devices (IEDs) and surrounded it with tripwires. In a further bid to deter rescue attempts, they threatened to kill 50 hostages for every one of their own members killed by the police, and to kill 20 hostages for every gunman injured. They also threatened to blow up the school if government forces attacked. To avoid being overwhelmed by a gas attack as were their comrades in the 2002 Moscow hostage crisis, insurgents quickly smashed the school's windows. The captors prevented hostages from eating and drinking (calling this a "hunger strike") until North Ossetia's president Alexander Dzasokhov would arrive to negotiate with them. However, the FSB set up its own crisis headquarters from which Dzasokhov was excluded, and threatened to arrest him if he tried to go to the school.

The Russian government announced that it would not use force to rescue the hostages, and negotiations toward a peaceful resolution took place on the first and second days, at first led by Leonid Roshal, a pediatrician whom the hostage-takers had reportedly requested by name. Roshal had helped negotiate the release of children in the 2002 Moscow siege, but had also given advice to the Russian security services as they prepared to storm the theatre, for which he received the Hero of Russia award; however, a witness statement indicated that the Russian negotiators confused Roshal with Vladimir Rushailo, a Russian security official. According to State Duma member Yuri Savelyev's report, the official ("civilian") headquarters sought a peaceful resolution while the secret ("heavy") headquarters set up by the FSB was preparing the assault. Savelyev wrote that, in many ways, the "heavies" restricted the actions of the "civilians", in particular in their attempts to negotiate with the militants.

At Russia's request, a special meeting of the United Nations Security Council was convened on the evening of 1 September 2004, at which the council members demanded "the immediate and unconditional release of all hostages of the terrorist attack." U.S. president George W. Bush made a statement offering "support in any form" to Russia.

=== Day two ===
On 2 September 2004, negotiations between Roshal and the militants proved unsuccessful, and they refused to allow food, water or medicine to be taken in for the hostages or for the dead bodies to be removed from the front of the school. At noon, FSB First Deputy Director Colonel General Vladimir Pronichev showed Dzasokhov a decree signed by prime minister Mikhail Fradkov appointing the North Ossetian FSB chief, Major General Valery Andreyev, as head of the operational headquarters. However, in April 2005 a Moscow News journalist received photocopies of the interview protocols of Dzasokhov and Andreyev by investigators, revealing that two headquarters had been formed in Beslan: a formal one, upon which was laid all responsibility, and a secret one, which made the real decisions, and at which Andreyev had never been in charge.

The Russian government downplayed the numbers, repeatedly stating there were only 354 hostages; this reportedly angered the hostage-takers, who further mistreated their captives. Several officials also said there appeared to be only 15 to 20 militants in the school. The crisis was met with a near-total silence from President of Russia Vladimir Putin and the rest of Russia's political leaders. Only on the second day did Putin make his first public comment on the siege during a meeting in Moscow with King Abdullah II of Jordan: "Our main task, of course, is to save the lives and health of those who became hostages. All actions by our forces involved in rescuing the hostages will be dedicated exclusively to this task." It was the only public statement by Putin about the crisis until the day after it ended. In protest, several people at the scene raised signs reading: "Putin! Release our children! Meet their demands!" and "Putin! There are at least 800 hostages!" The locals also said that they would not allow any storming or "poisoning of their children", an allusion to the Moscow hostage crisis chemical agent.

Hundreds of hostages packed into the school gym with wired explosives attached to the basketball hoop (a frame from the Aushev tape)

In the afternoon, the gunmen allowed former president of Ingushetia Ruslan Aushev to enter the school building and agreed to personally release to him 11 nursing women and all 15 babies. The women's older children were left behind and one mother refused to leave, so Aushev carried out her youngest child instead. The terrorists gave Aushev a videotape made in the school and a note with demands from their purported leader, Shamil Basayev, who was not present in Beslan. The existence of the note was kept secret by Russian authorities, while the tape was declared as being empty (which was later proved incorrect). It was falsely announced that the militants had made no demands. In the note, Basayev demanded recognition of a "formal independence for Chechnya" in the framework of the Commonwealth of Independent States. He also said that although the Chechen separatists "had played no part" in the 1999 Russian apartment bombings, they would now publicly take responsibility for them if needed. Some Russian officials and state-controlled media later criticised Aushev for entering the school, accusing him of colluding with the terrorists.

The lack of food and water took a toll upon the young children, many of whom were forced to stand for long periods in the hot, tightly packed gym. Many children disrobed because of the sweltering heat in the gymnasium, which led to false rumors of sexual impropriety. Many children fainted, and parents feared that these children would die. Some hostages drank their own urine. Occasionally, the militants (many of whom took off their masks) took out some of the unconscious children and poured water on their heads before returning them to the sports hall. Later in the day, some adults also started to faint from fatigue and thirst. Because of the conditions in the gym, when the explosions and gun battle began on the third day, many of the surviving children were so fatigued that they were barely able to flee.

Around 15:30, two grenades were detonated by the militants against security forces outside the school approximately ten minutes apart, setting a police car on fire and injuring one officer, but Russian forces did not return fire. As the day and night wore on, the combination of stress and sleep deprivation—and possibly drug withdrawal—made the hostage-takers increasingly hysterical and unpredictable. The crying of the children irritated them, and on several occasions crying children and their mothers were threatened that they would be shot if the crying did not cease. Russian authorities claimed that the terrorists had listened to German heavy metal group Rammstein on personal stereos during the siege to keep themselves "edgy and fired up".

Overnight, a police officer was injured by shots fired from the school. Talks were broken off, resuming the next day.

=== Day three ===
Early on the third day, Ruslan Aushev, Alexander Dzasokhov, Taymuraz Mamsurov (North Ossetia's parliament chairman) and First Deputy Chairman Izrail Totoonti together made contact with the president of the Chechen Republic of Ichkeria, Aslan Maskhadov. Totoonti said that both Maskhadov and his Western-based emissary Akhmed Zakayev declared that they were ready to fly to Beslan to negotiate with the militants, which was later confirmed by Zakayev. Totoonti said that Maskhadov's sole demand was his unhindered passage to the school; however, the assault began one hour after the agreement for his arrival was made. He also mentioned that, for three days, journalists from Al Jazeera television offered to participate in the negotiations and enter the school, even as hostages, but were told "their services were not needed by anyone."

Russian presidential advisor, former police general and ethnic Chechen Aslambek Aslakhanov was also said to be close to a breakthrough in the secret negotiations. By the time that he left Moscow on the second day, Aslakhanov had accumulated the names of more than 700 well-known Russian figures who were volunteering to enter the school as hostages in exchange for the release of the children. Aslakhanov said that the hostage-takers agreed to allow him to enter the school the next day at 15:00. However, the storming had begun two hours before.

==== The first explosions and the fire in the gymnasium ====
Rough plan of the situation

Masked hostage-taker standing on a dead man's switch during the second day of the crisis (a frame from the Aushev tape)

Around 13:00 on 3 September, the militants allowed four Ministry of Emergency Situations medical workers in two ambulances to remove 20 bodies from the school grounds, and to bring the corpse of the killed terrorist to the school. However, at 13:03, when the paramedics approached the school, an explosion in the gymnasium was heard. The terrorists then opened fire on the paramedics, killing two. The other two took cover behind their vehicle.

The second explosion, described as "strange-sounding", was heard 22 seconds later. At 13:05, a fire started on the roof of the gymnasium, and soon the burning rafters and parts of the roof fell onto the hostages below, many of whom were injured but still alive. Eventually, the entire roof collapsed, filling the room with fire. The flames reportedly killed some 160 people, more than half of the total hostage fatalities.

There are several conflicting opinions regarding the source and nature of the explosions:

- According to the December 2005 report by Stanislav Kesayev, deputy speaker of the North Ossetian parliament, some witnesses said that a federal-forces sniper had shot a militant whose foot was on a dead man's switch detonator, triggering the first blast. The captured terrorist Nur-Pashi Kulayev has testified to this, while a local policewoman and hostage named Fatima Dudiyeva said that she was shot in the hand "from outside" just before the explosion and that there were three blasts: two small explosions at 13:03 followed by a larger one at 13:29.
- According to the State Duma member Yuri Savelyev, a weapons and explosives expert, the exchange of gunfire did not begin with explosions inside the school building, but with two shots fired from outside the school and most of the homemade explosive devices installed by the terrorists did not explode at all. He said that the first shot was most likely fired from an RPO-A Shmel infantry rocket on the roof of the nearby five-story building at No. 37, School Lane, and aimed at the gymnasium's attic, while the second was fired from an RPG-27 grenade launcher located at No. 41 on the same street, and destroyed part of the gym wall. Empty shells and launchers were found on the roofs of these houses, and alternative weapons mentioned in the report were RPG-26 or RPG-7 rocket-propelled grenades. Savelyev, a dissenting member of the federal commission headed by Aleksandr Torshin (see below), said that these explosions killed many of the hostages and that dozens more died in the resulting fire. Yuri Ivanov, another parliamentary investigator, further contended that the grenades were fired on the direct orders of President Putin. Several witnesses testified during the trial of Kulayev that the initial explosions were caused by projectiles fired from outside.
- In the final report, Aleksandr Torshin, head of the Russian parliamentary commission that concluded its work in December 2006, said that the militants had started the battle by intentionally detonating bombs among the hostages, to the surprise of Russian negotiators and commanders. This statement went beyond previous government accounts that mentioned that the bombs had exploded in an unexplained accident. Torshin's 2006 report said that the taking of hostages was planned as a suicide attack from the beginning and that no storming of the building was prepared in advance. According to testimonies by Nur-Pashi Kulayev and several former hostages and negotiators, the militants (including their leaders) blamed the government for the ensuing explosions.

==== Storming by Russian forces ====
Storming of School No. 1
- Part of Terrorism in Russia
Date	3 September 2004
Location	Beslan, North Ossetia–Alania, Russia
Result	Crisis ended: Many hostages were killed during the fire; 31 of the hostage-takers were killed

Belligerents
Russian Government: Russian Army; Militsiya; Internal Troops; Federal Security Service	Riyad-us Saliheen Brigade

Commanders and leaders
(Russia) Vladimir Putin	Vladimir Khodov †; Ruslan Khuchbarov †

Strength
(Russia) Unknown number of troops	32 militants

Casualties and losses
- At least 334 killed (excluding 31 militants); 700+ wounded

Part of the sports hall wall was demolished by the explosions, allowing some hostages to escape. The militants opened fire, and the military returned fire. A number of people were killed in the crossfire. Russian officials say that militants shot hostages as they ran and that the military fired back. The government asserted that once the shooting started, troops had no choice but to storm the building. However, some accounts by the town's residents have contradicted this official version of events.

Police lieutenant colonel Elbrus Nogayev, whose wife and daughter died in the school, said, "I heard a command saying, 'Stop shooting! Stop shooting!' while other troops' radios said, 'Attack!'" As the fighting began, oil-company president and negotiator Mikhail Gutseriyev, an ethnic Ingush, phoned the hostage-takers and heard "You tricked us!" in response. Five hours later, Gutseriyev and his interlocutor reportedly had their last conversation, during which the man said, "The blame is yours and the Kremlin's."

According to Torshin, the order to start the operation was given by the head of the North Ossetian FSB, Valery Andreyev. However, statements by both Andreyev and Dzasokhov indicated that it was FSB deputy directors Vladimir Pronichev and Vladimir Anisimov who were actually in charge of the Beslan operation. General Andreyev also told North Ossetia's Supreme Court that the decision to use heavy weapons during the assault was made by the head of the FSB's Special Operations Center, Colonel General Aleksandr Tikhonov.

A chaotic battle broke out as the special forces fought to enter the school. The forces included the assault groups of the FSB and the associated troops of the Russian Army and the Russian Interior Ministry, supported by a number of T-72 tanks from Russia's 58th Army (commandeered by Tikhonov from the military on 2 September), BTR-80 wheeled armoured personnel carriers and armed helicopters, including at least one Mi-24 attack helicopter. Many local civilians also joined the battle, having brought their own weapons, and at least one of the armed volunteers is known to have been killed. Alleged crime figure Aslan Gagiyev claimed to be among them. At the same time, regular conscripted soldiers reportedly fled the scene as the fighting began. Civilian witnesses claimed that the local police also panicked, sometimes firing in the wrong direction.

At least three, but as many as nine, powerful Shmel rockets were fired at the school from the special forces' positions (three or nine empty disposable tubes were later found on the rooftops of nearby apartment blocks). The use of the Shmel rockets, classified in Russia as flamethrowers and in the West as thermobaric weapons, was initially denied, but later admitted by the government. A report by an aide to the military prosecutor of the North Ossetian garrison stated that RPG-26 rocket-propelled grenades were used as well. The terrorists also used grenade launchers, firing at the Russian positions in the apartment buildings.

According to a military prosecutor, a BTR armoured vehicle drove close to the school and opened fire from its 14.5×114mm KPV heavy machine gun at the windows on the second floor. Eyewitnesses (among them Totoonti and Kesayev) and journalists saw two T-72 tanks advance on the school that afternoon, at least one of which fired its 125 mm main gun several times. Later during the trial, tank commander Viktor Kindeyev testified he provided the tank to the officer of the FSB and at around 21:00, the tank fired "one blank shot and six antipersonnel-high explosive shells" on orders from the FSB. The use of tanks and armoured personnel carriers was eventually admitted to by Lieutenant General Viktor Sobolev, commander of the 58th Army. Another witness cited in the Kesayev report claims that he had jumped onto the turret of a tank in an attempt to prevent it from firing on the school. Scores of hostages were moved by the militants from the burning sports hall into other parts of the school, in particular the cafeteria, where they were forced to stand at windows as human shields. Many of them were shot by troops outside, according to the survivors (including Kudzeyeva, Kusrayeva and Naldikoyeva). Savelyev estimated that 106 to 110 hostages died after having been moved to the cafeteria.

By 15:00, two hours after the assault began, Russian troops claimed control of most of the school. However, fighting was still continuing on the grounds as evening fell, including resistance from a group of militants holding out in the school's basement. During the battle, a group of some 13 militants broke through the military cordon and took refuge nearby. Several of them were believed to have entered a local two-story building, which was destroyed by tanks and flamethrowers around 21:00, according to the Ossetian committee's findings (Kesayev Report). Another group of militants appeared to head back over the railway, chased by helicopters into the town.

Firefighters, who were called by Andreyev two hours after the fire had started, were not prepared to battle the blaze that raged in the gymnasium. One fire truck crew arrived after two hours on their own initiative, but with only 200 liters (53 U.S. gal) of water, and were unable to connect to the nearby hydrants. The first water truck came at 15:28, nearly two and a half hours after the start of the fire; the second fire engine arrived at 15:43. Few ambulances were available to transport the hundreds of injured victims, who were mostly driven to the hospital in private cars. One suspected militant was reportedly lynched on the scene by a mob of civilians. An unarmed militant was captured alive by the OMON troops while trying to hide under a truck (he was later identified as Nur-Pashi Kulayev). Some of the dead insurgents appeared to have been mutilated by the commandos.

Sporadic explosions and gunfire continued during the night despite reports that all resistance by militants had been suppressed, until some 12 hours after the first explosions. Early the next day, Putin ordered the borders of North Ossetia closed while some of the terrorists were apparently still being pursued.

== Aftermath ==
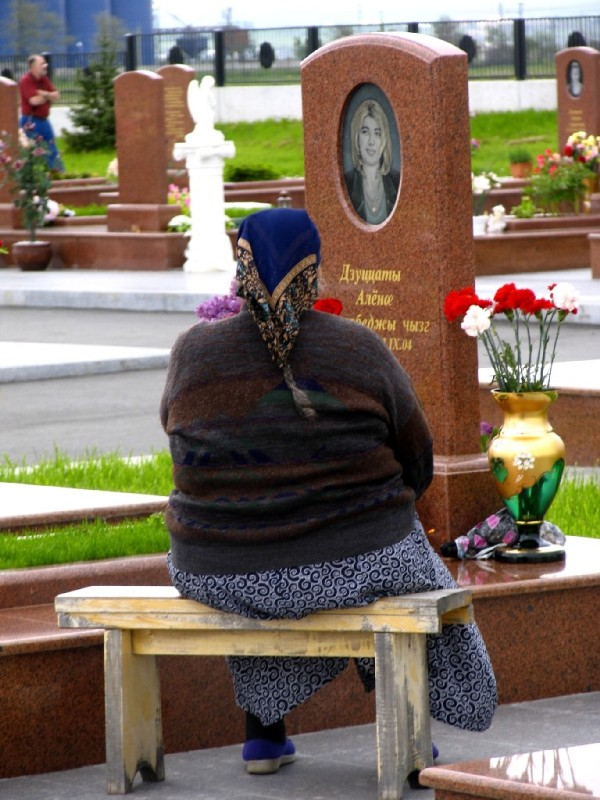
A Beslan mother at the cemetery for victims of the siege (2006)

After the conclusion of the crisis, many of the injured died before patients were sent to better-equipped facilities in Vladikavkaz as the only hospital in Beslan was unprepared to deal with the casualties. There was an inadequate supply of hospital beds, medication and neurosurgery equipment. Relatives were not allowed to visit hospitals where the wounded were treated, and doctors were not allowed to use their mobile phones.

The day after the storming, bulldozers gathered the debris of the building, including the body parts of the victims, and removed it to a garbage dump. The first of the many funerals was conducted on 4 September, the day after the final assault, with more following soon after, including a mass burial of 120 people. The local cemetery was too small and had to be expanded to an adjacent plot of land to accommodate the dead. Three days after the siege, 180 people were still missing. Many survivors remained severely traumatised and at least one former hostage committed suicide after returning home, shortly after identifying the body of her child.

In his only visit to Beslan, Putin appeared during a hurried trip to the Beslan hospital in the early hours of 4 September to see several of the wounded victims. He was later criticised for not meeting the families of victims. After returning to Moscow, he ordered a two-day period of national mourning on 6 and 7 September. In his televised speech, Putin said: "We showed ourselves to be weak. And the weak get beaten." On the second day of mourning, an estimated 135,000 people joined a government-organised rally against terrorism in Red Square in Moscow. In Saint Petersburg an estimated 40,000 people gathered in Palace Square.

Increased security measures were introduced to Russian cities after the crisis. More than 10,000 people without proper documents were detained by Moscow police in a "terrorist hunt". Colonel Magomed Tolboyev, a cosmonaut and Hero of the Russian Federation, was attacked and brutally beaten by a Moscow police patrol because of his Chechen-sounding name. The Russian public appeared to generally support increased security measures; a 16 September 2004 Levada-Center opinion poll found 58% of Russians supporting stricter counterterrorism laws and the death penalty for terrorism, while 33% would support banning all Chechens from entering Russian cities.

=== Long-term effects ===
In the wake of Beslan, the government proceeded to toughen laws on terrorism and expand the powers of law-enforcement agencies.

In addition, Putin signed a law that replaced the direct election of the heads of the federal subjects of Russia with a system in which they are proposed by the president of Russia and approved or disapproved by the elected legislative bodies of the federal subjects. In his interview, President Putin claimed that

"these proposals are in no way connected with the head of state's desire to obtain additional prerogatives or powers in relations with regional authorities. ... . The issue is the effectiveness of this system's functioning...".

Justifying the curtailment of citizens' democratic freedoms through the abolition of direct governor elections, he referred to the need to counter

"the economic struggle of local regional clans for spheres of influence and attempts to use the levers of power and governance to solve economic problems and redistribute property";

The fight against

"the process of increasing influence of economic groups and various economic clans, for the growth of their influence on the regional level of government";

The inefficiency of local authorities due to attempts by the federal government to establish alternative institutions subordinate to the federal centre

"In accordance with Article 77 of the Constitution of the Russian Federation, executive power in Russia constitutes a single entity. Unfortunately, nothing of the sort has been created in our country. ... . As soon as leaders began to be elected in the regions, the federal authorities came to see them as beyond their control, that we could not influence them in any way, that they did not obey us, that we could neither appoint nor dismiss them. We will build a parallel system of federal executive bodies at the local level. ... In practice, this leads to the disempowerment of governors and presidents of republics within Russia and the creation of another, parallel system of federal authorities at the local level, which do not function effectively";

And the fight against terrorism

"Are these proposals related to measures to combat terrorism or not? Of course they are, because we must create a system of power and governance in the country that would prevent our society and state from being destabilised and our state structures from collapsing".

In summary, President Putin argued that such anti-democratic reform would contribute to the creation of a system of government that would be "responsive to regional issues and closely linked to national interest". The election system for the Russian parliament was also repeatedly amended, eliminating the election of State Duma members by single-mandate districts. The Kremlin consolidated its control over the Russian media and increasingly attacked non-governmental organisations (especially those foreign-funded).

The raid on Beslan had more to do with the Ingush involved than with the Chechens, but it was highly symbolic for both regions. The Ossetes and Ingush have a conflict over ownership of the Prigorodny District that was inflamed by the 1944 Stalinist purges and the 1992–1993 ethnic cleansing of Ingush by Ossetes, with assistance from the Russian military. At the time of the raid, more than 40,000 Ingush refugees lived in tent camps in Ingushetia and Chechnya. The Beslan school itself had been used against the Ingush: in 1992, the gym was used as a pen to round up Ingush during the ethnic cleansing by the Ossetes. For the Chechens, the motive was revenge for the destruction of their homes and families; Beslan was one of the sites from which federal air raids were launched into Chechnya.

Upon learning that many children were killed by a terrorist group that included Chechens, many Chechens felt shame. A spokesman for Chechen independence cause stated: "A bigger blow could not have been dealt on us ... People around the world will think that Chechens are beasts and monsters if they could attack children."

== Casualties ==
By 7 September 2004, Russian officials stated that 334 people had died, including 156 children; at that point, 200 people remained missing or unidentified. The Torshin Report stated that ultimately no bodies remained unidentified. Locals stated that more than 200 of those killed were found with burns, and 100 or more of them were burned alive. In 2005, two hostages died from injuries sustained in the incident, as did a hostage in August 2006. A 33-year-old librarian, Yelena Avdonina, succumbed to a hematoma on 8 December 2006. At that time The Washington Post stated that the death toll was 334, excluding terrorists. The city of Beslan states a death toll of 335 on its website. The death toll includes 186 children.

Category of fatality	Number of fatalities
Children aged 1 to 17	186
Parents, friends and other guests	112
Teachers and school staff	17
FSB employees	10
Civilian rescuers	6
Employees of MoES	2
Employees of MoIA	1
Total	334

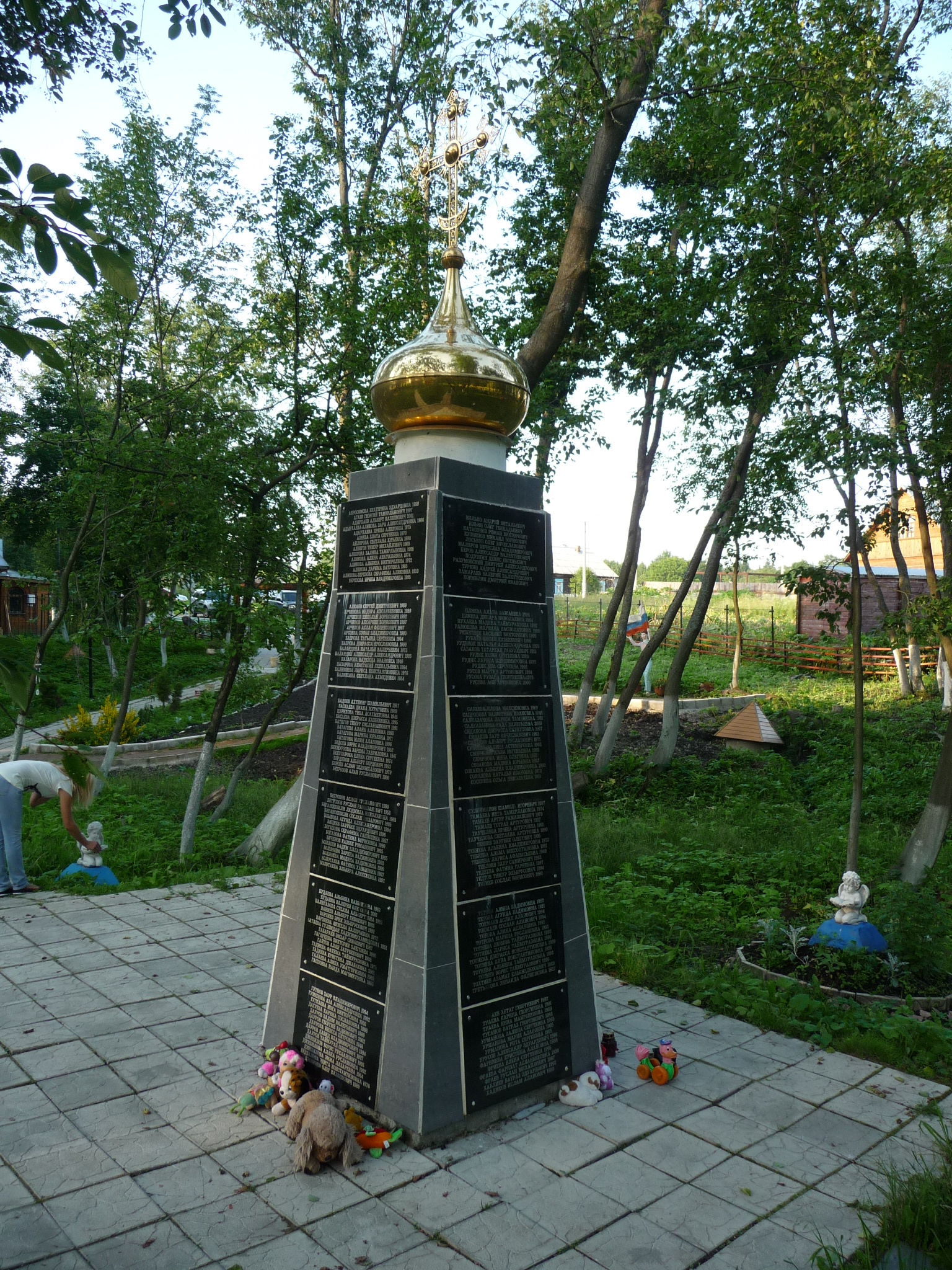
Monument in Moscow Oblast

Russia's Minister of Health and Social Reform Mikhail Zurabov said that the total number injured in the crisis exceeded 1,200. The exact number of people who received ambulatory assistance immediately after the crisis is not known, but is estimated to be around 700 (753 according to the U.N.). Moscow-based military analyst Pavel Felgenhauer concluded on 7 September 2004 that 90% of the surviving hostages had sustained injuries. At least 437 people, including 221 children, were hospitalised; 197 children were taken to the Children's Republican Clinical Hospital in the North Ossetian capital of Vladikavkaz, and 30 were in cardiopulmonary resuscitation units in critical condition. Another 150 people were transferred to the Vladikavkaz Emergency Hospital. Sixty-two people, including 12 children, were treated in two local hospitals in Beslan, while six children with severe injuries were flown to Moscow for specialist treatment. The majority of the children were treated for burns, gunshot injuries, shrapnel wounds and mutilation caused by explosions. Some had limbs amputated and eyes removed, and many children were permanently disabled. One month after the attack, 240 people (160 of them children) were still being treated in hospitals in Vladikavkaz and Beslan. Surviving children and parents have received psychological treatment at Vladikavkaz Rehabilitation Centre.

One of the hostages, a physical education teacher called Yanis Kanidis (a Caucasus Greek, originally from Georgia) who was killed in the siege, saved the lives of many children. One of the new schools built in Beslan was subsequently named in his honour.

The operation also became the bloodiest in the history of the Russian anti-terrorist special forces. Ten members of the special forces died (7 Vympel and 3 Alpha members). A commando called Vyacheslav Bocharov was believed to have been killed, but proved to be seriously wounded in the face but alive when he regained consciousness and managed to write down his name.

The fatalities included all three commanders of the assault groups: Colonel Oleg Ilyin and Lieutenant Colonel Dmitry Razumovsky of Vympel, and Major Alexander Perov of Alpha. At least 30 commandos suffered serious wounds.

== Identity of hostage-takers, motives, and responsibility ==
=== Responsibility ===
Initially, the identity and origin of the attackers was unclear. It was widely assumed from Day Two that they were separatists from nearby Chechnya, though Putin's Chechen aide Aslambek Aslakhanov denied it, saying, "They were not Chechens. When I started talking with them in Chechen, they had answered: 'We do not understand; speak Russian.'" Freed hostages said that the hostage-takers spoke Russian with accents typical of Caucasians.

Though Putin had rarely hesitated to blame Chechen separatists for past acts of terrorism, he avoided linking the attack with the Second Chechen War. Instead, he blamed the crisis on the "direct intervention of international terrorism", ignoring the nationalist roots of the crisis. Russian government sources initially claimed that nine of the militants in Beslan were Arabs and one was a black African (called "a negro" by Andreyev), though only two Arabs were later identified. Independent analysts such as Moscow political commentator Andrei Piontkovsky said that Putin tried to minimise the number and scale of Chechen terrorist attacks rather than exaggerate them as he had done in the past. Putin appeared to connect the events to the U.S.-led war on terror, but at the same time accused the West of indulging terrorists.

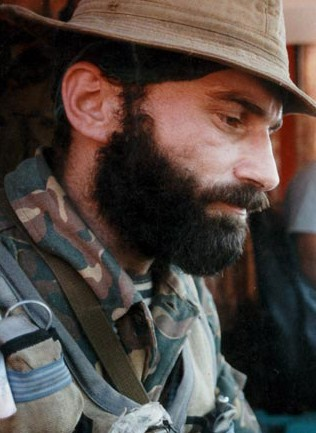
Shamil Basayev (1995)

On 17 September 2004, Chechen terrorist leader Shamil Basayev, operating autonomously from the rest of the North Caucasian terrorist movement, issued a statement claiming responsibility for the Beslan school siege, boasting that the siege only cost 8,000 euros. The event was strikingly similar to the Chechen raid on Budyonnovsk in 1995 and the Moscow theatre hostage crisis of 2002, incidents in which hundreds of Russian civilians were held hostage by Chechen terrorists led by Basayev. Basayev said that his Riyad-us Saliheen "brigade of martyrs" had carried out the attack and also claimed responsibility for a series of terrorist bombings in Russia in the weeks before the Beslan crisis. He said that he had originally planned to seize at least one school in either Moscow or Saint Petersburg, but lack of funds forced him to pick North Ossetia, "the Russian garrison in the North Caucasus." Basayev blamed the Russian authorities for "a terrible tragedy" in Beslan. Basayev claimed that he had miscalculated the Kremlin's determination to end the crisis by all means possible. He said he was "cruelly mistaken" and that he was "not delighted by what happened there", but also added to be "planning more Beslan-type operations in the future because we are forced to do so." However, it was the last major act of terrorism in Russia until 2009, as Basayev was soon persuaded to give up indiscriminate attacks by new Chechen leader Abdul-Halim Sadulayev, who made Basayev his second-in-command but banned hostage-taking, kidnapping for ransom and operations specifically targeting civilians.

Chechen separatist leader Aslan Maskhadov denied that his forces were involved in the siege, calling it "a blasphemy" for which "there is no justification". Maskhadov described the perpetrators of Beslan as "Madmen" driven out of their senses by Russian acts of brutality. He condemned the action and all attacks against civilians via a statement issued by his envoy Akhmed Zakayev in London, blaming it on what he called a radical local group, and he agreed to the North Ossetian proposition to act as a negotiator. Later, he also called on western governments to initiate peace talks between Russia and Chechnya and added to "categorically refute all accusations by the Russian government that President Maskhadov had any involvement in the Beslan event." Putin responded that he would not negotiate with "child-killers", comparing the calls for negotiations with the appeasement of Hitler, and put a $10 million bounty on Maskhadov (the same amount as for Basayev). Maskhadov was killed by Russian commandos in Chechnya on 8 March 2005 and buried at an undisclosed location.

Shortly after the crisis, official Russian sources stated that the attackers were part of a supposed international group led by Basayev that included a number of Arabs with connections to al-Qaeda, and claimed that they had picked up phone calls in Arabic from the Beslan school to Saudi Arabia and another undisclosed Middle Eastern country.

Two British-Algerians, Osman Larussi and Yacine Benalia, were initially named as having actively participated in the attack. Another British-Algerian, Kamel Rabat Bouralha, was arrested while trying to leave Russia immediately following the attack as he was suspected to be a key organiser. All three were linked to the Finsbury Park Mosque of North London. Allegations of al-Qaeda involvement were not repeated by the Russian government. Larussi and Benalia are not named in the Torshin Report and were never identified by Russian authorities as suspects in the Beslan attack.

The following people were named by the Russian government as planners and financiers of the attack:

- Shamil Basayev – Chechen terrorist leader who took ultimate responsibility for the attack. He died in Ingushetia in July 2006 in disputed circumstances.
- Kamel Rabat Bouralha – British-Algerian suspected of organizing the attack who was reportedly detained in Chechnya in September 2004.
- Abu Omar al-Saif – Saudi national and accused financer, killed in Dagestan in December 2005.
- Abu Zaid Al-Kuwaiti – Kuwaiti and accused organiser who died in Ingushetia in February 2005.

In November 2004, 28-year-old Akhmed Merzhoyev and 16-year-old Marina Korigova of Sagopshi, Ingushetia were arrested by Russian authorities in connection with the Beslan attack. Merzhoyev was charged with providing food and equipment to the terrorists, and Korigova was charged with having possession of a phone that Tsechoyev had phoned multiple times. Korigova was released when her defence attorney showed that she was given the phone by an acquaintance after the crisis.

=== Motives and demands ===
Russian negotiators say that the Beslan militants never explicitly stated their demands, although they did have notes handwritten by one of the hostages on a school notebook, in which they spelled out demands of full Russian troop withdrawal from Chechnya and recognition of Chechen independence.

The hostage-takers were reported to have made the following demands on 1 September 11:00–11:30 in a letter sent along with a hostage ER doctor:

- Recognition of the independence of Chechnya at the U.N. and withdrawal of Russian troops.
- Presence of the following people at the school: Aleksander Dzasokhov (president of North Ossetia), Murat Zyazikov (president of Ingushetia), Ruslan Aushev (former president of Ingushetia) and Leonid Roshal (a pediatrician). Alternatively, instead of Roshal and Aushev, the hostage-takers might have named Vladimir Rushailo and Alu Alkhanov (pro-Moscow president of Chechnya).

Dzasokhov and Zyazikov did not come to Beslan; Dzasokhov later claimed that he was forcibly stopped by "a very high-ranking general from the Interior Ministry [who] said, 'I have received orders to arrest you if you try to go'." The stated reason why Zyazikov did not arrive was that he had been "sick". Aushev, Zyazikov's predecessor at the post of Ingushetia's president, who was forced to resign by Putin in 2002, entered the school and secured the release of 26 hostages.

Aslakhanov said that the hostage-takers also demanded the release of some 28 to 30 suspects detained in the crackdown following the terrorist raids in Ingushetia earlier in June.

Later, Basayev said the terrorists also demanded a letter of resignation from President Putin.

=== Hostage-takers ===
According to the official version of events, 32 militants participated directly in the seizure, one of whom was taken alive while the rest were killed on the spot. The number and identity of hostage-takers remains a controversial topic, fuelled by the often-contradictory government statements and official documents. The 3–4 September government statements said that a total of 26–27 militants were killed during the siege. At least four militants died prior to the Russian storming of the school.

Many of the surviving hostages and eyewitnesses claim there were many more captors, some of whom may have escaped. It was also initially claimed that three terrorists were captured alive, including their leader Vladimir Khodov and a female militant. Witness testimonies during the Kulayev trial reported the presence of a number of apparently Slavic-, unaccented Russian- and "perfect" Ossetian-speaking individuals among the militants who were not seen among the bodies of those killed by Russian security forces. The unknown men (and a woman, according to one testimony) included a man with a red beard who was reportedly issuing orders to the kidnappers' leaders, and whom the hostages were forbidden to look at. He was possibly the militant known only as "Fantomas", an ethnic Russian who served as a bodyguard to Shamil Basayev.

- The Kesayev Report (2005) estimated that about 50 terrorist fighters took part in the siege, based on witness accounts and the number of weapons left at the scene.
- The Savelyev Report (September 2006) said that there were between 58 and 76 militants, of which many managed to escape by slipping past the cordon around the school.
- The Torshin Report (December 2006) determined that 34 militants were involved, of whom 32 entered the school and 31 died there, and said that two accomplices remain at large (one of whom is Yunus Matsiyev, a bodyguard of Basayev).

According to Basayev (who called the attack "Nord-West" in allusion to Nord-Ost), "Thirty-three mujahideen took part in Nord-West. Two of them were women. We prepared four [women] but I sent two of them to Moscow on August 24. They then boarded the two airplanes that blew up. In the group there were 12 Chechen men, two Chechen women, nine Ingush, three Russians, two Arabs, two Ossetians, one Tartar, one Kabardinian and one Guran."

Basayev further said an FSB agent (Khodov) had been sent undercover to the terrorists to persuade them to carry out an attack on a target in North Ossetia's capital, Vladikavkaz, and that the group was allowed to enter the region with ease because the FSB planned to capture them at their destination in Vladikavkaz. He also claimed that an unnamed hostage-taker had survived the siege and managed to escape.

==== Identities ====
On 6 September 2004, the names and identities of seven of the assailants became known, after forensic work over the weekend and interviews with surviving hostages and a captured assailant. The forensic tests also established that 21 of the hostage-takers took heroin, methamphetamine as well as morphine in a normally lethal amount; the investigation cited the use of drugs as a reason for the militants' ability to continue fighting despite being badly wounded and presumably in great pain. In November 2004, Russian officials announced that 27 of the 32 hostage-takers had been identified. However, in September 2005, the lead prosecutor against Nur-Pashi Kulayev stated that only 22 of the 32 bodies of the captors had been identified, leading to further confusion over which identities have been confirmed.

Most of the suspects, aged 20–35, were identified as Ingush or residents of Ingushetia (some of them Chechen refugees). At least five of the suspected hostage-takers were declared dead by Russian authorities before the seizure, while eight were known to have been previously arrested and then released, in some cases shortly before the Beslan attack.

Male

The male hostage-takers were tentatively identified by the Russian government as:

- Ruslan Tagirovich Khuchbarov (Note: Also spelled Khochubarov) (32), nicknamed "Polkovnik" (Russian for "Colonel") – An ethnic Ingush from Galashki, Ingushetia. Reputed group leader, disputed identity, possibly escaped and at large. Basayev identified him as "Col. Orstkhoyev". Reportedly referred to by the other militants also as "Ali", he led the negotiations on behalf of the hostage-takers. Initially reported to be Ali Taziyev, an Ingush policeman-turned-terrorist who was declared legally dead in 2000; but this was later refuted by the Russian prosecutors. During the negotiations, "Ali" had claimed his family was killed by the Russians in Chechnya. Investigators thought him to be Akhmed Yevloyev ("Magas"), an Ingush terrorist leader also known as Ali Taziyev, but those reports were also declared incorrect later. "Magas" was captured by the FSB in 2010.
- Vladimir Anatolievich Khodov (Note: Not to be confused with the head of the Beslan administration in 2004, also named Vladimir Khodov.) (28), nicknamed "Abdullah" – An ethnic Ossetian-Ukrainian from the village of Elkhotovo in Kirovsky District of North Ossetia, Khodov was a former pupil of the Beslan SNO and one of the reputed leaders of the hostage-takers. Some of the survivors described him as the most frightening and aggressive of all the militants. Khodov converted to Islam while in prison for rape. He was officially wanted for a series of bomb attacks in Vladikavkaz, yet he lived openly in his hometown for over a month before the attack. Basayev claimed that Khodov was an FSB double agent code-named "Putnik" ("Traveller"), sent to infiltrate the terrorist movement.
- Iznaur Kodzoyev – An Ingush from Kantyshevo, Ingushetia, and father of five children. His cousin claimed he saw him in their home village on the second day of the siege. In August 2005 the Russian forces in Ingushetia killed a man identified as Iznaur Kodzoyev, who they said was one of hostage-takers, despite the fact that his body was identified among these killed in Beslan. Kodzoyev had been also previously announced by the Russians to be killed months before the Beslan crisis.
- Khizir-Ali Akhmedov (30) – Native of Bilto-Yurt, Chechnya.
- Rustam Atayev (25) – An ethnic Chechen native to Psedakh, Ingushetia. His 12-year-old younger brother and two other boys were murdered in 2002 in Grozny by unidentified men in camouflage.
- Rizvan Vakhitovich Barchashvili (26) – A native of Nesterovskaya, a Cossack village in Ingushetia. Barchashvili had changed his name to Aldzbekov. His body was identified by DNA testing.
- Usman Magomedovich Aushev (33) – An Ingush from Ekazhevo, Ingushetia.
- Adam Magomed-Khasanovich Iliyev (20) – An Ingush from Malgobek, Ingushetia. Iliyev was arrested a year before for illegal arms possession and then released.
- Ibragim Magomedovich Dzortov (28) – An Ingush from Nazran, Ingushetia.
- Ilnur Gainullin (23) – An ethnic Tatar and medical school graduate "from a good family" in Moscow.
- Aslangirey Beksultanovich Gatagazhev (29) – An Ingush from Sagopshi, Ingushetia.
- Sultan Kamurzoyev (27) – A Chechen from Kazakhstan. Other sources say he was from Nazran, Ingushetia, and that he was arrested as a terrorist fighter in Chechnya in 2000.
- Magomed (Note: Also spelled Magomet) Khuchbarov (21) – An Ingush from Nazran. Native of Surkhakhi, Ingushetia, Khochubarov had a conviction for the illegal possession of weapons.
- Khan-Pashi Kulayev (31) – A Chechen from Engenoi. He had lost his hand in Russian captivity from an untreated wound. Kulayev was the older brother of Nur-Pashi and a former bodyguard of Basayev. He was released from Russian prison before the attack.
- Nur-Pashi Kulayev (23) – A Chechen from Engenoi recruited to help his brother Khan-Pashi despite (as he maintained) being admitted into pro-Moscow Chechen militia forces of Ramzan Kadyrov ("Kadyrovtsy"). Captured in Beslan and sentenced to life in prison.
- Adam Kushtov (17) – An ethnic Ingush who as a child had fled North Ossetia during the ethnic cleansing in 1992.
- Abdul-Azim Labazanov (31) – A Chechen born in internal exile in Kazakhstan. He has initially fought on the Russian side in the First Chechen War before defecting to the group of Dokka Umarov.
- Arsen Merzhoyev (25) – A native of Engenoi, Chechnya.
- Adam Akhmedovich Poshev (22) – An Ingush from Malgobek, Ingushetia.
- Mayrbek Said-Aliyevich Shaybekhanov (Note: Also spelled Mairbek Shebikhanov) (25) – A Chechen from Engenoi who lived in Psedakh, Ingushetia. He was arrested in Ingushetia and then released shortly before the school attack.
- Islam Said-Aliyevich Shaybekhanov (20) – A Chechen from Engenoi who lived in Psedakh, Ingushetia.
- Buran Tetradze (31) – Allegedly an ethnic Georgian and native of Rustavi, Georgia. His identity/existence was refuted by Georgia's security minister.
- Issa Torshkhoyev (Note: Also spelled Isa Torshkhoev) (26) – An Ingush native of Malgobek, Ingushetia. He was wanted since the shootout in 2003 when his home was raided by the police. His family asserted that his interest in joining the Chechen militant movement was incited when Torshkhoyev witnessed five of his close friends being killed by Russian security forces during the same raid. His father, who was brought in to identify his body, reportedly claimed that the body was not that of his son.
- Issa Zhumaldinovich Tarshkhoyev (23) – An Ingush from Malgobek, Ingushetia. He was arrested for armed robbery in 1999 but was later released.
- Bei-Alla Bashirovich (Note: Also spelled Bay Ala) Tsechoyev (31) – An Ingush, had a prior conviction for possessing illegal firearms.
- Musa Isayevich Tsechoyev (35) – An Ingush from Sagopshi, Ingushetia who owned the truck that drove the insurgents to the school.
- Timur Magomedovich Tsokiyev (Note: Also spelled Tsokiev) (31) – An Ingush from Sagopshi, Ingushetia.
- Aslan Akhmedovich Yaryzhev (22) – An Ingush from Malgobek, Ingushetia.

Female

In April 2005, the identity of the shahidka female militants was revealed:

- Roza Nagayeva (30) – A Chechen woman from the village of Kirov-Yurt in Chechnya's Vedensky District and sister of Amnat Nagayeva, who was suspected of being the suicide bomber who blew up one of the two Russian airliners brought down on 24 August 2004. Roza Nagayeva was previously named as having bombed the Rizhskaya metro station in Moscow on 31 August 2004.
- Mairam (Note: Also spelled Maryam) Taburova (27) – A Chechen woman from the village of Mair-Tub in Chechnya's Shalinsky District.

== Official investigations and trials ==
=== Kulayev's interrogation and trial ===
The captured suspect, 24-year-old Nur-Pashi Kulayev, born in Chechnya, was identified by former hostages as one of the hostage-takers. The state-controlled Channel One showed fragments of Kulayev's interrogation in which he said his group was led by a Chechnya-born man nicknamed Polkovnik and by the North Ossetia native Vladimir Khodov. According to Kulayev, Polkovnik shot another militant and detonated two female suicide bombers because they objected to capturing children.

In May 2005, Kulayev was a defendant in a court in the Republic of North Ossetia. He was charged with murder, terrorism, kidnapping, and other crimes and pleaded guilty on seven of the counts; many former hostages denounced the trial as a "smoke screen" and "farce". Some of the relatives of the victims, who used the trial in their attempts to accuse the authorities, even called for a pardon for Kulayev so he could speak freely about what happened. The director of the FSB, Nikolai Patrushev, was summoned to give evidence, but he did not attend the trial. Ten days later, on 26 May 2006, Nur-Pashi Kulayev was sentenced to life imprisonment. Kulayev later disappeared in the Russian prison system. Following questions about whether Kulayev had been killed or died in prison, Russian government officials said in 2007 that he was alive and awaiting the start of his sentence. Kulayev reportedly submitted a request for a review of the court's decision in 2021, and following its rejection, a request for a retrial in 2022.

=== Investigation by federal prosecutors ===
Family members of the victims of the attacks have accused the security forces of incompetence, and have demanded that authorities be held accountable. Putin personally promised to the Mothers of Beslan group to hold an "objective investigation". On 26 December 2005, Russian prosecutors investigating the siege on the school declared that authorities had made no mistakes whatsoever.

=== Torshin's parliamentary commission ===
At a press conference with foreign journalists on 6 September 2004, Vladimir Putin rejected the prospect of an open public inquiry, but cautiously agreed with an idea of a parliamentary investigation led by the State Duma, dominated by the pro-Kremlin parties.

In November 2004, the Interfax news agency reported Aleksandr Torshin, head of the parliamentary commission, as saying that there was evidence of involvement by "a foreign intelligence agency" (he declined to say which). On 22 December 2006, the Russian parliamentary commission ended their investigation into the incident. Their report concluded that the number of gunmen who stormed the school was 32 and laid much of the blame on the North Ossetian police, stating that there was a severe shortcoming in security measures, but also criticizing authorities for under-reporting the number of hostages involved. In addition, the commission said the attack on the school was premeditated by Chechen terrorist leadership, including the moderate leader Aslan Maskhadov. In another controversial move, the commission claimed that the shoot-out that ended the siege was instigated by the hostage-takers, not security forces. About the "grounded" decision to use flamethrowers, Torshin said that "international law does not prohibit using them against terrorists." Ella Kesayeva, an activist who leads a Beslan support group, suggested that the report was meant as a signal that Putin and his circle were no longer interested in having a discussion about the crisis.

On 28 August 2006, Duma member Yuri Savelyev, a member of the federal parliamentary inquiry panel, publicised his own report which he said proves that Russian forces deliberately stormed the school using maximum force. According to Savelyev, a weapons and explosives expert, special forces fired rocket-propelled grenades without warning as a prelude to an armed assault, ignoring apparently ongoing negotiations. In February 2007, two members of the commission (Savelyev and Yuri Ivanov) denounced the investigation as a cover-up, and the Kremlin's official version of events as fabricated. They refused to approve the Torshin's report.

=== Trials of the local police officials ===
Three local policemen of the Pravoberezhny District ROVD (district militsiya unit) were the only officials put on trial over the massacre. They were charged with negligence in failing to stop gunmen seizing the school. On 30 May 2007, the Pravoberezhny Court's judge granted an amnesty to them. In response, a group of dozens of local women rioted and ransacked the courtroom by smashing windows, overturning furniture, and tearing down a Russian flag. Victims' groups said the trial had been a whitewash designed to protect their superiors from blame. The victims of the siege said they would appeal against the court judgement.

In June 2007, a court in Kabardino-Balkaria charged two Malgobeksky District ROVD police officials, Mukhazhir Yevloyev and Akhmed Kotiyev, with negligence, accusing them of failing to prevent the attackers from setting up their training and staging camp in Ingushetia. The two pleaded innocent, and were acquitted in October 2007. The verdict was upheld by the Supreme Court of Ingushetia in March 2008. The victims said they would appeal the decision to the European Court for Human Rights.

=== 2026 investigative updates ===
For over two decades following the tragedy, the official Russian state narrative rigidly maintained that the attack was carried out by a sealed cell of exactly 32 militants, 31 of whom were killed and one captured. However, survivors and the Mothers of Beslan committee consistently challenged this ceiling, pointing to hostage testimonies suggesting that a larger group carried out the operation and that certain perpetrators may have successfully escaped the cordon.

In September 2026, during the 22nd anniversary of the siege, the committee announced that the Russian Federal Investigative Committee had officially modified its long-standing assessment, formalizing the final determined figure as "more than 32" militants. According to committee chairwoman Susanna Dudiyeva, the shift occurred after a direct meeting between survivors, Russian President Vladimir Putin, and Investigative Committee Chairman Alexander Bastrykin resulted in new federal directives to advance the stagnant case.

The criminal investigation legally remains open because forensic teams are still attempting to identify the unclaimed bodies of the liquidated terrorists. Forensic investigators believe one remaining body belongs to an Arab foreign fighter operating under the alias "Abu Farukh." Committee co-chair Aneta Gadieva noted that while Saudi Arabian authorities acknowledged the individual was presumably a Saudi citizen, conclusive identification remains stalled because Saudi officials have repeatedly declined to cooperate with Russian judicial requests or provide the matching family DNA profiles necessary to confirm the identity.

== Criticism of the Russian government ==
=== Allegations of incompetence and rights violations ===
The handling of the siege by Vladimir Putin's administration was criticised by a number of observers and grassroots organisations, amongst them Mothers of Beslan and Voice of Beslan. Soon after the crisis, the independent MP Vladimir Ryzhkov blamed "the top leadership" of Russia. Initially, the European Union also criticised the response.

Critics, including Beslan residents who survived the attack and relatives of the victims, focused on allegations that the storming of the school was ruthless. They cite the use of heavy weapons, such as tanks and Shmel thermobaric rockets. Their usage was officially confirmed. The Shmel is a type of thermobaric weapon, described by a source associated with the US military as "just about the most vicious weapon you can imagine – igniting the air, sucking the oxygen out of an enclosed area and creating a massive pressure wave crushing anything unfortunate enough to have lived through the conflagration." Pavel Felgenhauer has gone further and accused the government of also firing rockets from an Mi-24 attack helicopter, a claim that the authorities deny. Some human rights activists claim that at least 80% of the hostages were killed by indiscriminate Russian fire. According to Felgenhauer, "It was not a hostage rescue operation ... but an army operation aimed at wiping out the terrorists." David Satter of the Hudson Institute said the incident "presents a chilling portrait of the Russian leadership and its total disregard for human life".

The provincial government and police were criticised by the locals for having allowed the attack to take place, especially since police roadblocks on the way to Beslan were removed shortly before the attack. Many blamed rampant corruption that allowed the attackers to bribe their way through the checkpoints; in fact, this was even what they had openly boasted to their hostages. Others say the militants took the back roads used by smugglers in collusion with the police. Yulia Latynina alleged that Major Gurazhev was captured after he approached the militants' truck to demand a bribe for what he thought was an oil-smuggling operation. It was also alleged the federal police knew of the time and place of the planned attack; according to internal police documents obtained by Novaya Gazeta, the Moscow MVD knew about the hostage taking four hours in advance, having learned this from a militant captured in Chechnya. According to Basayev, the road to Beslan was cleared of roadblocks because the FSB planned to ambush the group later, believing the terrorists' aim was to seize the parliament of North Ossetia in Vladikavkaz.

Critics also charged that the authorities did not organise the siege properly, including failing to keep the scene secure from entry by civilians, while the emergency services were not prepared during the 52 hours of the crisis. The Russian government has been also heavily criticised by many of the local people who, days and even months after the siege, did not know whether their children were alive or dead, as the hospitals were isolated from the outside world. Two months after the crisis, a local driver named Muran Katsanov found human remains and identity documents in the garbage landfill at the outskirts of Beslan; the discovery prompted further outrage.

In addition, there were serious accusations that federal officials had not earnestly tried to negotiate with the hostage-takers (including the alleged threat from Moscow to arrest President Dzasokhov if he came to negotiate) and deliberately provided incorrect and inconsistent reports of the situation to the media.

==== Independent reports ====
The report by Yuri Savelyev, a dissenting parliamentary investigator and one of Russia's leading rocket scientists, placed the responsibility for the final massacre on actions of the Russian forces and the highest-placed officials in the federal government. Savelyev's 2006 report, devoting 280 pages to determining responsibility for the initial blast, concludes that the authorities decided to storm the school building, but wanted to create the impression they were acting in response to actions taken by the terrorists. (Note: These allegations are discussed in more detail elsewhere in this article.) Savelyev, the only expert on the physics of combustion on the commission, accused Torshin of "deliberate falsification".

A separate public inquiry by the North Ossetian parliament (headed by Kesayev) concluded on 29 November 2005 that both local and federal law enforcement mishandled the situation.

==== European Court complaint ====
On 26 June 2007, 89 relatives of victims lodged a joint complaint against Russia with the European Court of Human Rights (ECHR). The applicants say their rights were violated both during the hostage-taking and the trials that followed. The case was brought by over 400 Russians.

In an April 2017 judgement that supported the prosecutors, the court deemed that Russia's failure to act on "sufficient" evidence about a likely attack on a North Ossetia school had violated the "Right to Life" guaranteed by the European Convention on Human Rights. The court stated the error was made worse by the Russian use of "indiscriminate force". Results were published in April 2017, and found that Russian actions in using tank cannons, flame-throwers and grenade launchers "contributed to the casualties among the hostages", and had "not been compatible with the requirement under Article 2 that lethal force be used "no more than [is] absolutely necessary". The report also said that "The authorities had been in possession of sufficiently specific information of a planned terrorist attack in the area, linked to an educational institution", "nevertheless, not enough had been done to disrupt the terrorists meeting and preparing", or to warn schools or the public.

The ECHR court in Strasbourg ordered Russia to pay €2.9 million in damages and €88,000 in legal costs. The Court's findings were rejected by the Russian Government. Although obligated to accept the ruling because it is a signatory of the European Convention on Human Rights, the Kremlin called the ruling "absolutely unacceptable". The Russian government challenged it in a higher chamber: it argued that several of the court's conclusions were "not backed up", but ultimately agreed to the ruling after the complaints were rejected by the Strasbourg-based court.

=== Alleged threats, disinformation and suppression of information ===
==== Russian television reporting and false information ====
In resistance to the coverage on foreign television news channels (such as CNN and the BBC), the crisis was not broadcast live by the three major state-owned Russian television networks. The two main state-owned broadcasters, Channel One and Rossiya, did not interrupt their regular programming following the school seizure. After explosions and gunfire started on the third day, NTV Russia shifted away from the scenes of mayhem to broadcast a World War II soap opera. According to the Ekho Moskvy ("Echo of Moscow") radio station, 92% of the people polled said that Russian TV channels concealed parts of information.

Russian state-controlled television only reported official information about the number of hostages during the course of the crisis. The figure of 354 people was persistently given, initially reported by Lev Dzugayev (the press secretary of Dzasokhov) (Note: After the crisis, Dzugayev was promoted and a made minister for culture and mass communications of the republic.) and Valery Andreyev (the chief of the republican FSB). It was later claimed that Dzugayev only disseminated information given to him by "Russian presidential staff who were located in Beslan from 1 September". Torshin laid the blame squarely at Andreyev, for whom he reserved special scorn.

The deliberately false figure had grave consequences for the treatment of the hostages by their angered captors (the hostage-takers were reported saying, "Maybe we should kill enough of you to get down to that number") and contributed to the declaration of a "hunger strike". One inquiry has suggested that it may have prompted the militants to kill the group of male hostages shot on the first day. The government disinformation also sparked incidents of violence by the local residents, aware of the real numbers, against the members of Russian and foreign media.

On 8 September 2004, several leading Russian and international human-rights organisations – including Amnesty International, Human Rights Watch, Memorial, and Moscow Helsinki Group – issued a joint statement in which they pointed out the responsibility that Russian authorities bore in disseminating false information:

We are also seriously concerned with the fact that authorities concealed the true scale of the crisis by, inter alia, misinforming Russian society about the number of hostages. We call on Russian authorities to conduct a comprehensive investigation into the circumstances of the Beslan events which should include an examination of how authorities informed the whole society and the families of the hostages. We call on making the results of such an investigation public."

The Moscow daily tabloid Moskovskij Komsomolets ran a rubric headlined "Chronicle of Lies", detailing various initial reports put out by government officials about the hostage taking, which later turned out to be false.

==== Incidents involving Russian and foreign journalists ====
The late Novaya Gazeta journalist Anna Politkovskaya, who had negotiated during the 2002 Moscow siege, was twice prevented by the authorities from boarding a flight. When she eventually succeeded, she fell into a coma after being poisoned aboard an aeroplane bound for Rostov-on-Don.

According to the report by the Organization for Security and Co-operation in Europe (OSCE), several correspondents were detained or otherwise harassed after arriving in Beslan (including Russians Anna Gorbatova and Oksana Semyonova from Novye Izvestia, Madina Shavlokhova from Moskovskij Komsomolets, Elena Milashina from Novaya Gazeta, and Simon Ostrovskiy from The Moscow Times). Several foreign journalists were also briefly detained, including a group of journalists from the Polish Gazeta Wyborcza, French Libération, and British The Guardian. Many foreign journalists were exposed to pressure from the security forces and materials were confiscated from TV crews ZDF and ARD (Germany), AP Television News (US), and Rustavi 2 (Georgia). The crew of Rustavi 2 was arrested; the Georgian Minister of Health said that the correspondent Nana Lezhava, who had been kept for five days in the Russian pre-trial detention centers, had been poisoned with dangerous psychotropic drugs (like Politkovskaya, Lezhava had passed out after being given a cup of tea). The crew from another Georgian TV channel, Mze, was expelled from Beslan.

Raf Shakirov, chief editor of the Russia's leading newspaper, Izvestia, was forced to resign after criticism by the major shareholders of both style and content of the issue of 4 September 2004. In contrast to the less emotional coverage by other Russian newspapers, Izvestia had featured large pictures of dead or injured hostages. It also expressed doubts about the government's version of events.

==== Secret video materials ====
The video tape made by the hostage-takers and given to Ruslan Aushev on the second day was declared by the officials as being "blank". Aushev himself did not watch the tape before he handed it to government agents. A fragment of tape shot by the hostage-takers was shown on Russian NTV television several days after the crisis. Another fragment of a tape shot by the hostage-takers was acquired by media and publicised in January 2005.

In July 2007, the Mothers of Beslan asked the FSB to declassify video and audio archives on Beslan, saying there should be no secrets in the investigation. They did not receive any official answer to this request. However, the Mothers received an anonymous video, which they disclosed saying it might prove that the Russian security forces started the massacre by firing rocket-propelled grenades on the besieged building. The film had been kept secret by the authorities for nearly three years before being officially released by the Mothers on 4 September 2007. The graphic film apparently shows the prosecutors and military experts surveying the unexploded shrapnel-based bombs of the militants and structural damage in the school in Beslan shortly after the massacre. Footage shows a large hole in the wall of the sports hall, with a man saying, "The hole in the wall is not from this [kind of] explosion. Apparently someone fired [there]", adding that many victims bear no sign of shrapnel wounds. In another scene filmed next morning, a uniformed investigator points out that most of the IEDs in the school actually did not go off, and then points out a hole in the floor which he calls a "puncture of an explosive character".

=== Government response ===
In general, the criticism was rejected by the Russian government. President Vladimir Putin specifically dismissed the foreign criticism as Cold War mentality and said that the West wants to "pull the strings so that Russia won't raise its head."

The Russian government defended the use of tanks and other heavy weaponry, arguing that it was used only after surviving hostages escaped from the school. However, this contradicts the eyewitness accounts, including by the reporters and former hostages. According to the survivors and other witnesses, many hostages were seriously wounded and could not possibly escape by themselves, while others were kept by the terrorists as human shields and moved through the building.

Deputy Prosecutor General of Russia Nikolai Shepel, acting as deputy prosecutor at the trial of the sole surviving attacker, found no fault with the security forces in handling the siege, "According to the conclusions of the investigation, the expert commission did not find any violations that could be responsible for the harmful consequences." Shepel acknowledged that commandos fired flamethrowers, but said this could not have sparked the fire that caused most of the deaths; he also said that the troops did not use napalm during the attack.

To address doubts, in 2005, Putin launched a Duma parliamentary investigation led by Aleksandr Torshin, resulting in the report which criticised the federal government only indirectly and instead put blame for "a whole number of blunders and shortcomings" on local authorities. The findings of the federal and the North Ossetian commissions differed widely in many main aspects.

In 2005, previously unreleased documents by the national commission in Moscow were made available to Der Spiegel. According to the paper, "instead of calling for self-criticism in the wake of the disaster, the commission recommended the Russian government to crack down harder."

==== Dismissals and trials ====
Three local top officials resigned in the aftermath of the tragedy: (Note: President Zyazikov of Ingushetia was forced to resign in 2008 but for unrelated reasons: the death of oppositionist journalist Magomed Yevloyev, who was shot in police detention.)

- North Ossetian Interior Minister Kazbek Dzantiyev resigned shortly after the crisis, saying that after what happened in Beslan, he "[didn't] have the right to occupy this post as an officer and a man."
- Valery Andreyev, the chief of the Ossetia's FSB, also submitted his resignation soon after. However, he was later elevated to the prestigious position of Deputy Rector of FSB Academy.
- Alexander Dzasokhov, the president of North Ossetia, resigned his post on 31 May 2005, after a series of demonstrations against him in Beslan and public pressure from Mothers of Beslan on Putin to have him dismissed.

Five Ossetian and Ingush police officers were tried in the local courts; all of them were subsequently amnestied or acquitted in 2007. As of December 2009, none of the Russian federal officials suffered consequences in connection with the Beslan events.

== Other incidents and controversies ==
=== Escalation of the Ingush-Ossetian hostility ===
Nur-Pashi Kulayev, the sole survivor of the 32 attackers, claimed that attacking a school and targeting mothers and young children was not merely coincidental, but was deliberately designed for maximum outrage with the purpose of igniting a wider war in the Caucasus. According to Kulayev, the attackers hoped that the mostly Orthodox Ossetians would attack their mostly Muslim Ingush and Chechen neighbours to seek revenge, encouraging ethnic and religious hatred and strife throughout the North Caucasus. North Ossetia and Ingushetia had previously been involved in a brief but bloody conflict in 1992 over disputed land in the North Ossetian Prigorodny District, leaving up to 1,000 dead and some 40,000 to 60,000 displaced persons, mostly Ingush. Indeed, shortly after the Beslan massacre, 3,000 people demonstrated in Vladikavkaz calling for revenge against the ethnic Ingush.

The expected backlash against neighbouring nations failed to materialise on a massive scale. In one noted incident, a group of ethnic Ossetian soldiers led by a Russian officer detained two Chechen Spetsnaz soldiers and executed one of them. In July 2007, the office of the presidential envoy for the Southern Federal District Dmitry Kozak announced that a North Ossetian armed group engaged in abductions as retaliation for the Beslan school hostage-taking. FSB Lieutenant Colonel Alikhan Kalimatov, sent from Moscow to investigate these cases, was shot dead by unidentified gunmen in September 2007.

=== Grabovoy affair and the charges against Beslan activists ===
In September 2005, the self-proclaimed faith healer and miracle-maker Grigory Grabovoy claimed he could resurrect the murdered children. Grabovoy was arrested and indicted of fraud in April 2006, amidst the accusations that he was being used by the government as a tool to discredit the Mothers of Beslan group.

In January 2008, the Voice of Beslan group, which in the previous year had been court-ordered to disband, was charged by Russian prosecutors with "extremism" for their appeals in 2005 to the European Parliament to help establish an international investigation. This was soon followed with other charges, some of them relating to the 2007 court incident. As of February 2008, the group was charged in total of four different criminal cases.

== Memorial ==
Russian Patriarch Alexius II's plans to build an Orthodox church as part of the Beslan monument caused a serious conflict between the Orthodox Church and the leadership of the Russian Muslims in 2007. Beslan victims organisations also spoke against the project, and many in Beslan want the ruins of the school to be preserved, opposing the government plan to demolish them.

== International response ==
The attack at Beslan was met with international abhorrence and universal condemnation. Countries and charities around the world donated to funds set up to assist the families and children that were involved in the Beslan crisis.

At the end of 2004, the International Foundation For Terror Act Victims had raised over $1.2 million with a goal of $10 million. The Israeli government offered help in rehabilitating freed hostages, and during Russian Prime Minister Mikhail Fradkov's visit to China in November 2005, the Chinese Health Ministry announced that they were sending doctors to Beslan, and offered free medical care to any of the victims who still needed treatment. The then mayor of Croatia's capital Zagreb, Vlasta Pavić, offered free vacations to the Adriatic Sea to the Beslan children.

On 1 September 2005, UNICEF marked the first anniversary of the Beslan school tragedy by calling on all adults to shield children from war and conflict.

Maria Sharapova and many other female Russian tennis players wore black ribbons during the 2004 US Open in memory of the tragedy.

In August 2005, two new schools were built in Beslan, paid for by the Moscow government.

== Media portrayal ==
=== Films ===
- Children of Beslan (2005), a HBO Documentary Films and BBC co-production, produced and directed by Ewa Ewart and Leslie Woodhead, nominated in three different categories under the 2006 Emmy Award festival, and awarded the Royal Television Society prize in the category Best Single Documentary. It also won a Peabody Award in 2005.
- The Beslan Siege (2005), a television documentary by October Films, directed by Richard Alwyn and produced by Liana Pomeranzev, won the Prix Italia Documentary Award for 2006
- Return to Beslan (Terug naar Beslan) (2005) A Dutch documentary produced by Netherlands Public Broadcasting, won an Emmy Award in 2005 for "Best Continuing News Coverage"
- Three Days in September (2006), directed by Joe Halderman and narrated by Julia Roberts
- Beslan (in development but later shelved), a proposed feature film that was set to be produced by Brian Grazer of Imagine Entertainment.
- Beslan. Remember (2019), a YouTube documentary by Russian journalist Yury Dud commemorating the 15th anniversary of the massacre. It featured interviews with witnesses, hostages, journalists, and bureaucrats including Ruslan Aushev, and received over 14 million views in 2 weeks. The film was criticised by state media, with Vladimir Solovyov being one of the most vocal. The film received praise from independent publication Novaya Gazeta.
- Unclenching the Fists (2021), a film that while not covering the siege, depicts a teenaged girl suffering from physical trauma from the attack. She has scars on her lower abdomen and worse, has urinary incontinence. Her strict father distrusts any institutions, thus will not let her receive surgery and therefore she has to wear adult diapers daily.

=== Music ===
- "Black Widow's Eyes" by the Who
- "Living Shields" by After Forever
- “Savages “ by Paul Weller

=== Books ===
- Beslan: The Tragedy of School No. 1 by Timothy Phillips
- Innocent Targets: When Terrorism Comes to School is a school terrorism textbook that features a chapter dedicated to the incident as well as several other chapters devoted to commentary on the topic in general.
- Mother Tongue, by Julie Mayhew, is a fictionalised account following a young woman who lost her sister in the tragedy.

=== Plays ===
- Us/Them

== See also ==
- City of Angels — memorial cemetery in Beslan
- List of hostage crises
- List of massacres in Russia
- Kizlyar-Pervomayskoye hostage crisis (1996)
