= Nur-Pashi Kulayev =

Russian terrorist (born 1980)

- Born: 28 October 1980 (age 46); Nozhay-Yurtovsky District, Chechen-Ingush Autonomous Soviet Socialist Republic, RSFSR, Soviet Union
- Status: Imprisoned
- Motive: Islamic terrorism
- Criminal charges: Multiple, including terrorism, hostage taking and murder of two or more people
- Penalty: Life imprisonment

Details
- Victims: 334 (together with 31 other terrorists)
- Date: 1–3 September 2004
- Imprisoned at: Polar Owl penal colony, Yamalo-Nenets AO, Russia

Nur-Pashi Aburkashevich Kulayev (Russian: Нурпаша́ Абурка́шевич Кула́ев; born 28 October 1980) is a Chechen terrorist and the sole survivor of the 32 hostage-takers in the 2004 Beslan school hostage crisis. A native of Nozhay-Yurtovsky District, Chechnya, Kulayev was a 23-year-old unemployed carpenter at the time of the attack. His brother Khan-Pashi Kulayev had formerly served as bodyguard for Shamil Basayev.

== Trial ==
Kulayev's trial began in Vladikavkaz on 17 May 2005, with prosecutors General Nikolai Shepel and Maria Semisynova seeking life imprisonment on charges of terrorism, murder and hostage-taking on behalf of 1,343 plaintiffs. The trial judge was Tamerlan Aguzarov, and Kulayev was defended by Umar Sikoyev and Albert Pliyev, the latter of whom had only practised law for just two weeks prior to being appointed by the state.

His defense lay in the claim that he was one of the recruited Chechens who were told they would be attacking a military checkpoint, and had no foreknowledge their target was the Beslan school. The Sydney Morning Herald has been criticized for titling Kulayev the "Timid Guerilla" and referring to him as "more sheepish than sinister."

About a month later, the Mothers of Beslan spawned a new group dubbed the Voice of Beslan, which was considered more radical than the former.

On 16 December 2005, Valery Andreyev, chief of the North Ossetian Federal Security Service (FSB) at the time of the hostage-taking, testified that he had personally given the order to overrun the school during the siege. Four days later it was announced that Alexander Dzasokhov, the former leader of North Ossetia, would testify at Kulayev's trial. His presence was demanded by the Mothers of Beslan.

== Verdict ==
On 16 February 2006, the trial concluded, pending a verdict due 1 July. The Mothers of Beslan reportedly requested the death penalty for Kulayev while the Voice of Beslan lobbied against it. The reading of the verdict began on 16 May 2006, and Kulayev was sentenced to life imprisonment.

== Imprisonment ==
Kulayev was imprisoned in a high-security prison on the small lake island of Ognenny Ostrov in the Vologda region. According to one source, he has been given a new name to protect him from possible retaliation by other inmates. The Vologda Colony authorities refused to comment, saying it was secret information.

Kulayev's appeals, which had the support of some of the Beslan mothers, were turned down, and his life sentence was upheld in December 2006. He did not appear in the court.

In January 2007 the head of the Beslan commission asked the Chief Administration for Penitentiary Service of Russia to confirm or refute the assumption that Kulayev was dead. The Federal Punishment Execution Service refuted this, saying he was in "investigatory custody awaiting delivery for serving his punishment".

In March 2007, Kulayev arrived in Polar Owl.

In September 2021, Kulayev again appealed against his conviction, citing irregularities during the trial as well as shoddy work from his former lawyer Albert Pliyev. In 2022, having been rejected, Kulayev again requested a review of the case.

== See also ==
- List of hostage crises
