= Avdiky =

Russian masculine given name

Avdiky (Russian: Авди́кий) is an old and uncommon Russian Christian male first name. Its colloquial variants are Adiky (Ади́кий) and Avda (А́вда). It is possibly derived from the Latin word abdico, meaning to denounce, to relinquish, or to deny.

The diminutives of "Avdiky" are Avdya (А́вдя), Avdyusha (Авдю́ша), and Adya (А́дя).

The patronymics derived from "Avdiky" are "Авди́киевич" (Avdikiyevich) and "Авди́кьевич" (Avdikyevich; both masculine), and "Авди́киевна" (Avdikiyevna) and "Авди́кьевна" (Avdikyevna; both feminine).
