= Avdey =

Russian masculine given name

Avdey (Russian: Авде́й) is an uncommon Russian masculine first name. The Russian language borrowed the name from Byzantine Christianity in the form of Avdiy (А́вдий or Авди́й), but in the colloquial usage it transformed into "Avdey". "Avdiy" continued to be a form used by the Russian Orthodox Church, having replaced an earlier form Audiy (Ауди́й). The name derives either from the Biblical Hebrew Obadiah (abdiyāhu), meaning god's slave, god's servant, or from Greek audēis, meaning sonorous, melodious—from the Biblical prophet Obadiah.

The diminutives of "Avdey" include Ava (А́ва) and Deya (Де́я), as well as Avdeyka (Авде́йка), Avdya (А́вдя), Avda (А́вда), Avdyukha (Авдю́ха), Avdyusha (Авдю́ша), Avdasha (Авда́ша), Avdyunya (Авдю́ня), Avdusya (Авду́ся), Avdyusya (Авдю́ся), and Adya (А́дя).

The patronymics derived from "Avdey" are "Авде́евич" (Avdeyevich; masculine) and its colloquial form "Авде́ич" (Avdeich), and "Авде́евна" (Avdeyevna; feminine).

Last names Avdonin, Avdokhin, Avdoshin, Avdyunin, and Avdyushin all derive from this first name.

== Sources ==
- Ganzhina, I. M. (2001). Slovarʹ sovremennykh russkikh familiĭ [Dictionary of Modern Russian Last Names] (in Russian). Moskva: Ast, Astrelʹ. ISBN 978-5-237-04101-9.
- Fedosi͡uk, I͡Uriĭ (2002). Russkie familii: populi︠a︡rnyĭ ėtimologicheskiĭ slovarʹ [Russian Last Names: a Popular Etymological Dictionary]. Moskva: Flinta, Nauka. ISBN 978-5-89349-216-3. OCLC 51035228.
