= Avdon (given name) =

Russian masculine given name

Avdon (Russian: Авдо́н) is an old and uncommon Russian Christian male first name. Its colloquial variant is Ovdon (Овдо́н). It is possibly derived from the Biblical Hebrew word abdōn, meaning god's slave, god's servant.

The diminutives of "Avdon" are Avdonya (Авдо́ня), Avdokha (Авдо́ха), Avdosha (Авдо́ша), Avdya (А́вдя), Avda (А́вда), Avdyusha (Авдю́ша), and Donya (До́ня).

The patronymics derived from "Avdon" are "Авдо́нович" (Avdonovich; masculine) and "Авдо́новна" (Avdonovna; feminine).
