= Administrative divisions of North Ossetia–Alania =

Administrative districts of Russian federal subject

Republic of North Ossetia–Alania Russia
- Capital: Vladikavkaz

Administrative structure (as of 2014)
- Districts: 8
- Cities/towns: 6
- Urban-type settlements: 1
- Selsovets: 100

Municipal structure (as of 2002)
- Rural settlements: 209 (inhabited); 26 (uninhabited)

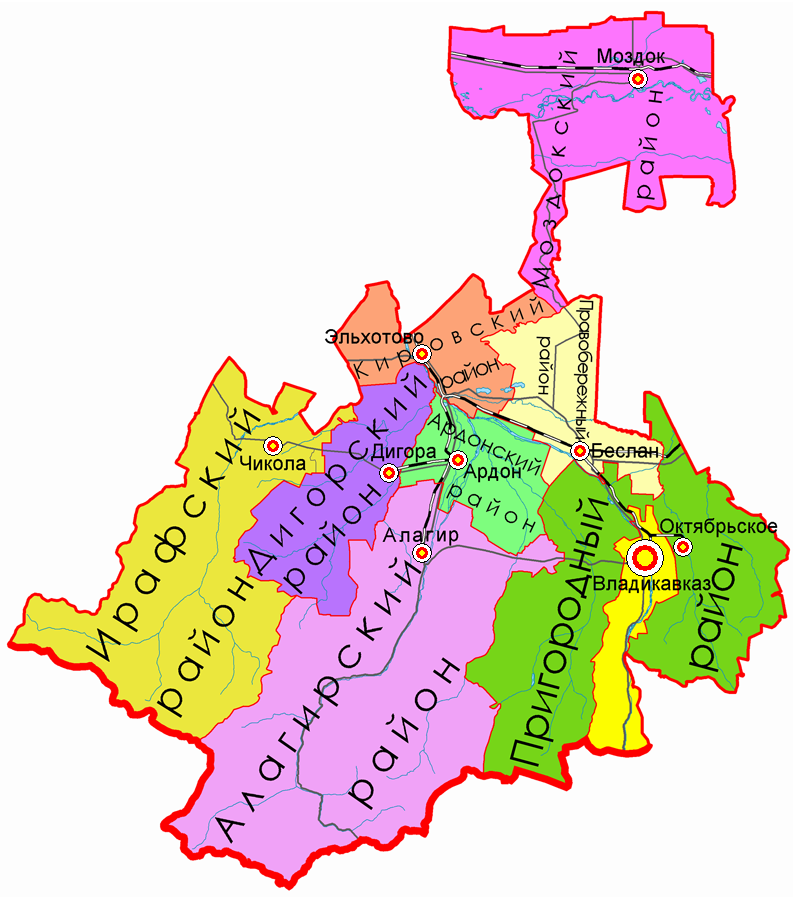
Map of the Republic of North Ossetia–Alania

Republic of North Ossetia–Alania is a federal subject of Russia.

== Administrative and municipal divisions ==
Map

- Cities and towns under republic's jurisdiction:
  - Vladikavkaz (Владикавказ) (capital)
    - City districts:
      - Iristonsky (Иристонский)
      - Promyshlenny (Промышленный)
        - Urban-type settlements under the city district's jurisdiction:
          - Zavodskoy (Заводской)
      - Severo-Zapadny (Северо-Западный)
      - Zaterechny (Затеречный)
- Districts:
  - Alagirsky (Алагирский)
    - Towns under the district's jurisdiction:
      - Alagir (Алагир)
    - with 20 rural okrugs under the district's jurisdiction.
  - Ardonsky (Ардонский)
    - Towns under the district's jurisdiction:
      - Ardon (Ардон)
    - with 8 rural okrugs under the district's jurisdiction.
  - Digorsky (Дигорский)
    - Towns under the district's jurisdiction:
      - Digora (Дигора)
    - with 5 rural okrugs under the district's jurisdiction.
  - Irafsky (Ирафский)
    - with 14 rural okrugs under the district's jurisdiction.
  - Kirovsky (Кировский)
    - with 7 rural okrugs under the district's jurisdiction.
  - Mozdoksky (Моздокский)
    - Towns under the district's jurisdiction:
      - Mozdok (Моздок)
    - with 17 rural okrugs under the district's jurisdiction.
  - Pravoberezhny (Правобережный)
    - Towns under the district's jurisdiction:
      - Beslan (Беслан)
    - with 10 rural okrugs under the district's jurisdiction.
  - Prigorodny (Пригородный)
    - with 19 rural okrugs under the district's jurisdiction.
