= Zavodsky City District =

Zavodsky City District may refer to:

- Zavodsky City District, Russia, the name of several city districts in Russia
- Zavodski District, a city district of Minsk, Belarus
- Zavodskyi District (disambiguation), name of several city districts in Ukraine

== See also ==
- Zavodskoy (disambiguation)
- Zavodsky (disambiguation)
