= Zavodsky City District, Russia =

Zavodsky City District is the name of several city divisions in Russia.

- Zavodsky City District, Kemerovo, a city district of Kemerovo, the administrative center of Kemerovo Oblast
- Zavodsky City District, Novokuznetsk, a city district of Novokuznetsk, a city in Kemerovo Oblast
Cities in Russia with a city division called "Zavodsky"

== See also ==
- Zavodskoy (disambiguation)
- Zavodsky (disambiguation)
