= Zavodskyi District =

Zavodskyi District (Ukrainian: Заводський район) is the name of several urban districts (raions) in Ukraine:

- Zavodskyi District, Kamianske, in Dnipropetrovsk Oblast, an Urban districts of Ukraine
- Zavodskyi District, Mykolaiv, in Mykolaiv Oblast, an Urban districts of Ukraine
- Zavodskyi District, Zaporizhia, in Zaporizhia Oblast

== See also ==
- Zavodsky (disambiguation)
- Zavodsky City District (disambiguation)
