= North Ossetia–Alania Opera and Ballet Theatre =

Performance venue in North Ossetia–Alania

Coordinates: 43°01′52″N 44°40′34″E

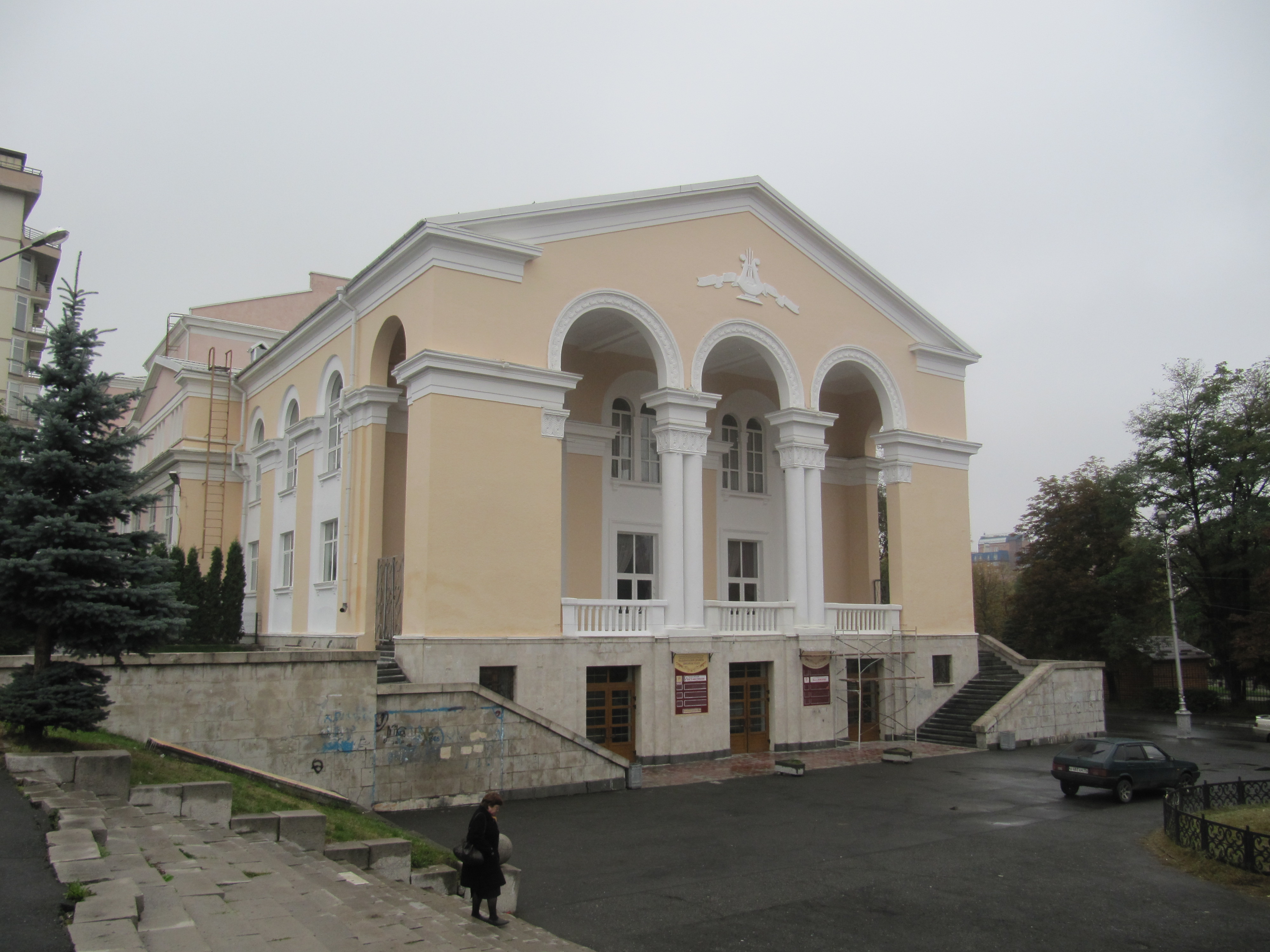
The theatre in 2015

The North Ossetia–Alania Opera and Ballet Theatre (officially the National State Opera and Ballet Theatre of the Republic of North Ossetia–Alania), also known as the Mariinsky Theatre Alania Branch, is a national opera and ballet theatre in Vladikavkaz, Russia.

== History ==
The theatre was founded as the North Ossetian Music and Drama Theatre in 1958, before functioning officially as an opera and ballet from 1972.

Since 2005, the theatre has hosted the International Music Festival "Larisa Gergieva Invites", and also the International Mariinsky Vladikavkaz Festival.

In 2012, the North Ossetia–Alania Opera and Ballet Theatre was recognized by the republic, and it was awarded the title of "National Theatre", and subsequently became a branch of Mariinsky Theatre in 2017.

The theatre's current artistic director is Larisa Gergieva, and its past conductors include Valery Gergiev and Tugan Sokhiev.
