= Elkhotovo =

Rural locality in North Ossetia–Alania, Russia

Coordinates: 43°20′45″N 44°12′10″E

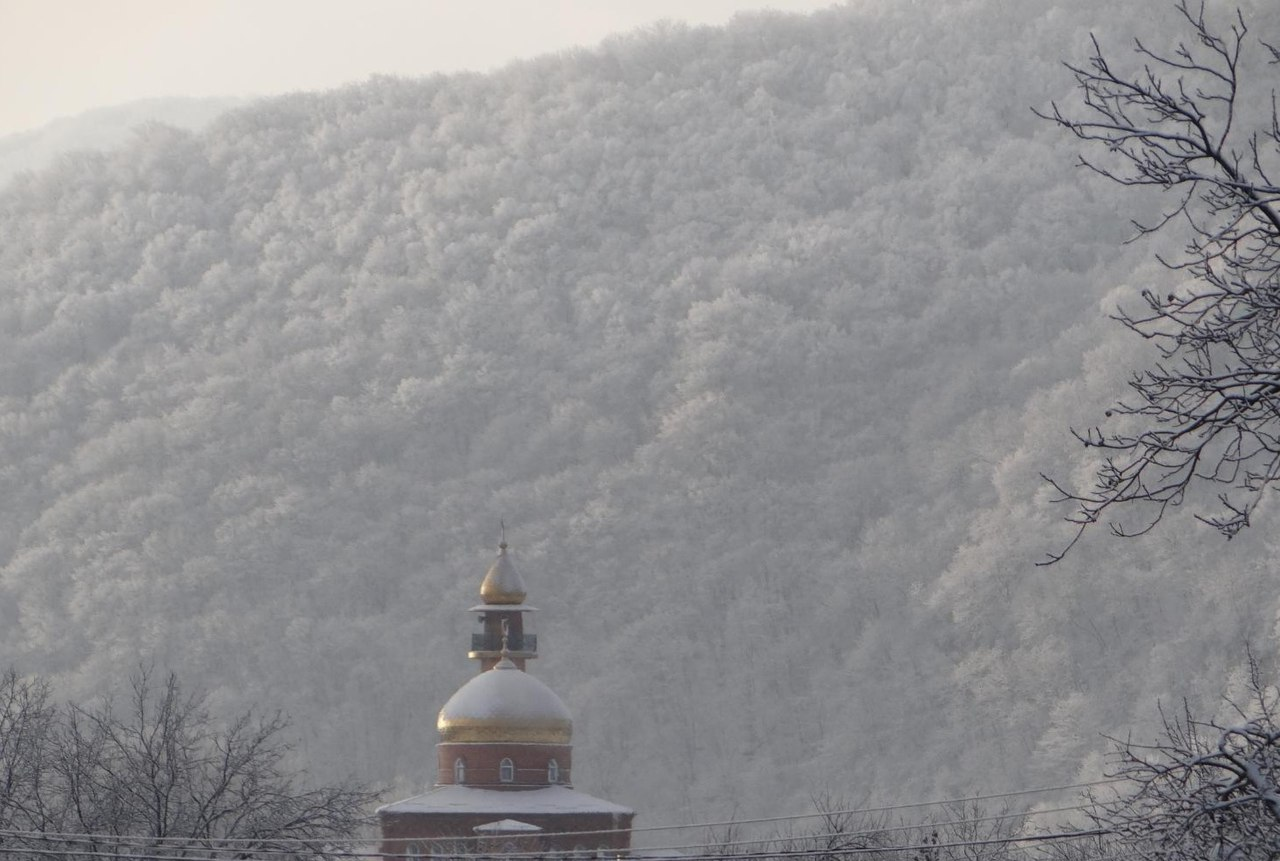
Mosque in the village of Elkhotovo

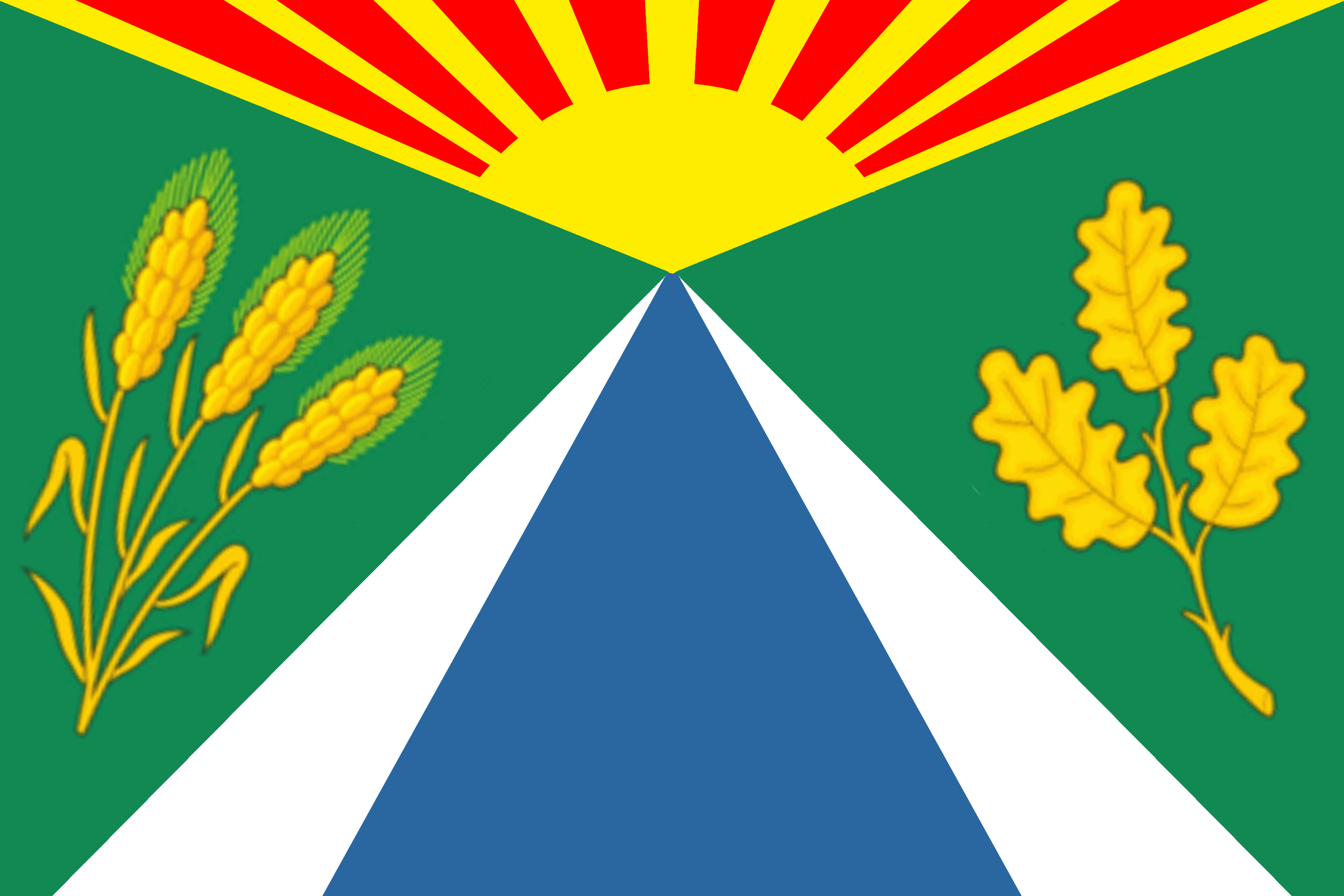
Flag of Elkhotovo

Elkhotovo (Russian: Эльхотово; Iron Ossetic: Елхот, romanized: Elxot) is a rural locality (a selo) and the administrative center of Kirovsky District of the Republic of North Ossetia–Alania, Russia. Population: 12,626 (2010 census); 12,208 (2002 census); 8,574 (1989 Soviet census).
