= Akhsarbek Abaev =

Red army sergeant

Akhsarbek Magometovich Abaev
- Æбати Мæхæмæти фурт Æхсарбег
- Born: 14 December 1923; Khristianovskoye village, Mountain ASSR (present-day Digora)
- Died: 13 May 1982 (aged 58); Digora, Georgian SSR
- Military career
- Allegiance: Soviet Union
- Branch: Red Army
- Service years: 1942 — 1945
- Rank: Sergeant
- Unit: 2nd Guards Rifle Division
- Conflicts: World War II: Battle of the Caucasus; Kerch-Eltigen Operation; Crimean Offensive; Siauliai Offensive; Battle of Memel; East Prussian Offensive; Battle of Berlin
- Awards: Hero of the Soviet Union

Akhsarbek Magometovich Abaev (Ossetian: Æбати Мæхæмæти фурт Æхсарбег, Russian: Ахсарбек Магометович Абаев; 14 December 1923 – 13 May 1982) was an Ossetian Red Army Sergeant and Hero of the Soviet Union. Abaev was awarded the title for reportedly killing 32 German soldiers in the Kerch–Eltigen Operation during November 1943. After the war Abaev worked in the rail transport system and returned to his birthplace of Digora, where he worked on a farm.

== Early life ==
Abaev was born in the village of Khristianovskoye, Mountain Autonomous Soviet Socialist Republic to a peasant family. After completing primary education, Abaev worked on the farm.

== World War II ==
In August 1942, he was drafted into the Red Army. Abaev was sent to the 6th Guards Rifle Regiment of the 2nd Guards Rifle Division. His first combat action occurred in late October in the battle for the villages of Lesken and Chikola. With a small group of soldiers Abaev was cut off from his unit for six hours. In this action, Abaev reportedly killed ten German soldiers and was wounded in the right arm but continued to throw grenades. Abaev was then reportedly wounded more seriously and was eventually evacuated. At the end of December, the division launched an attack and Abaev was involved in the recapture of Digora. In early 1943 he fought in the capture of Nalchik, Yessentuki, Kislovodsk, Cherkessk, Armavir, Ust-Labinsk, and Krymsk. During the summer of 1943 Abaev fought in the battle for the Kuban bridgehead.

For his actions in the North Caucasus, Abaev was awarded the Medal for Battle Merit and the Medal "For the Defence of the Caucasus". He was promoted to Sergeant in the 6th Guards Rifle Regiment of the 2nd Guards Rifle Division and became a squad leader. In November 1943, he fought in the Kerch–Eltigen Operation. On 2 November Abaev was reportedly among the first off the assault boat. A German machine gun prevented the advance to Height 63. Abaev reportedly killed the crew and turned the machine gun around on the German troops, enabling the capture of the Height. In two days he reportedly killed 32 German soldiers, nine in combat on Height 175. He also captured four other German soldiers. On 16 May 1944, he was awarded the title Hero of the Soviet Union and the Order of Lenin for his actions in Kerch.

During April and May 1944, Abaev fought in the Crimean Offensive. During July and August Abaev fought in the Šiauliai Offensive. For his actions he received the Order of the Red Star. In October, he fought in the Memel Offensive. In early 1945 Abaev fought in the East Prussian Offensive and then the Battle of Berlin in April and early May.

== Later life ==
In 1945, he was demobilized. Abaev graduated from the Ordzhonikidze technical school in 1947. Until 1957, Abaev worked in the Uzbek SSR rail transport system. In 1958 he returned to Digora and began working at the Tsygalov State Farm. Abaev later worked at the district consumer society's road transport enterprise. In 1970, Abaev joined the Communist Party of the Soviet Union. He lived and worked in Digora and died on 13 May 1982.
