= North Ossetian State University =

University in Vladikavkaz, Russia

- Северо-Осетинский государственный университет имени К. Л. Хетагурова (Russian)
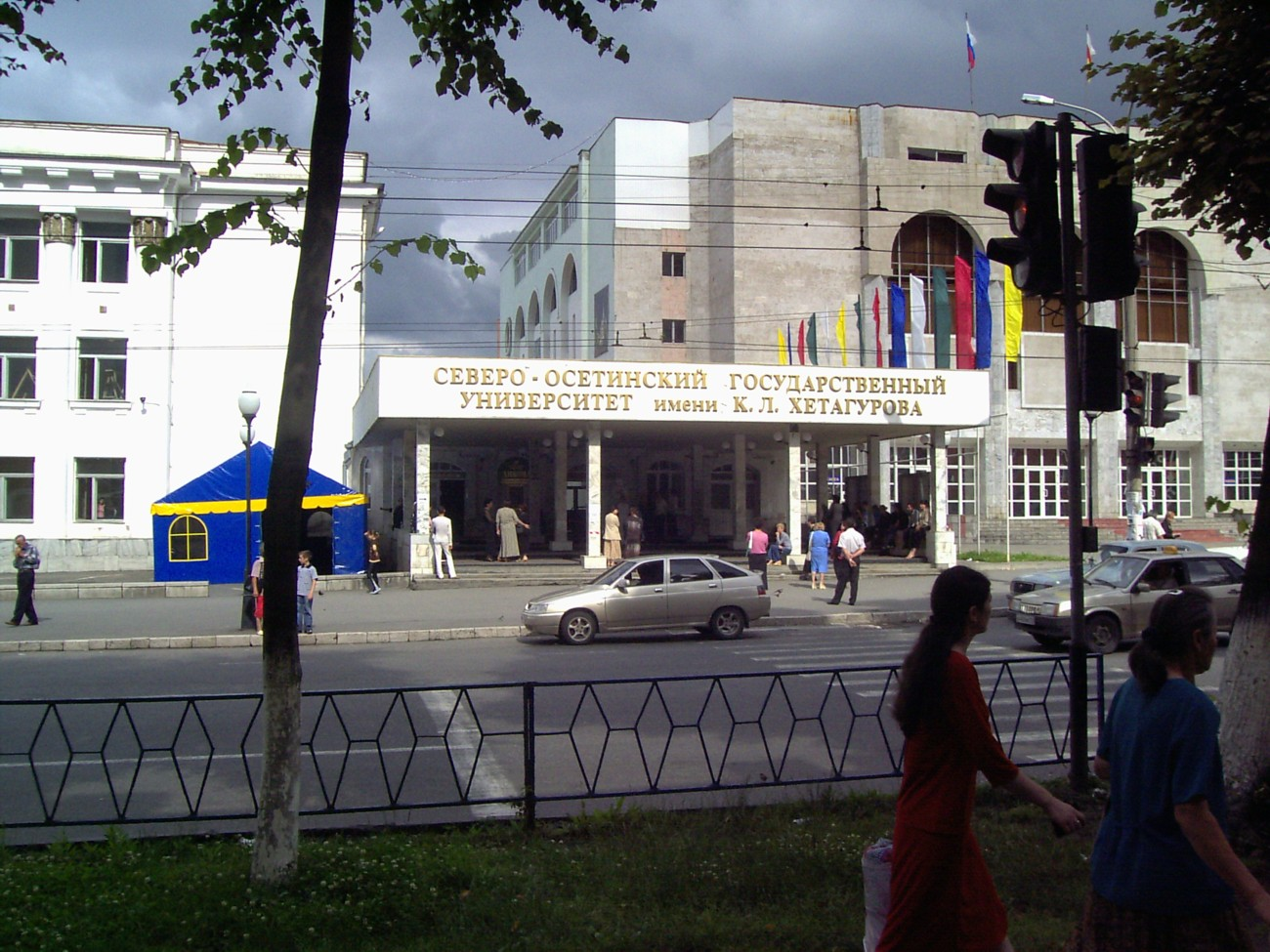
- Type: Public research
- Established: 1920
- Location: Vladikavkaz, North Ossetia–Alania, Russia; 43.0264°N 44.6928°E
- Campus: Urban
- Website: nosu.ru

North Ossetian State University named after K. L. Khetagurov (NOSU, Russian: Северо-Осетинский государственный университет имени К. Л. Хетагурова, СОГУ; Iron Ossetic: Хетӕгкаты Къостайы номыл Цӕгат Ирыстоны паддзахадон университет) is a university in Vladikavkaz, Russia. It was founded in 1920 and was named after Kosta Levanovich Khetagurov. The university's aims are education, cooperation, and innovation.

== International cooperation ==
International cooperation has always been one of NOSU development priorities. Since 2000 the university has initiated and participated in joint research and academic projects with the European Commission, the UN, International Research Institute of Stanford University. In recent years more than 500 students and faculty participated in international conferences, workshops, and scientific exchange programs (USAID, IREX, DAAD, Fulbright, Tempus, Copernicus, etc.).

== Campus ==
NOSU has two academic buildings in different parts of the city and two dormitories that can accommodate about 300 students. According to rector of the university, Alan Ogoev, the university plans to build a new 500-seat dormitory to have more places for foreign students.
