= Zavodskoy (inhabited locality) =

Zavodskoy (Russian: Заводско́й) is the name of several rural localities in Russia.

== Modern inhabited localities ==
=== Urban localities ===
- Zavodskoy, Republic of North Ossetia-Alania, an urban-type settlement under the administrative jurisdiction of Promyshlenny City District of Vladikavkaz City Under Republic Jurisdiction in the Republic of North Ossetia–Alania

=== Rural localities ===
- Zavodskoy, Altai Krai, a settlement in Zavodskoy Selsoviet of Tyumentsevsky District of Altai Krai
- Zavodskoy, Irkutsk Oblast, a settlement in Chunsky District of Irkutsk Oblast
- Zavodskoy, Kirov Oblast, a settlement under the administrative jurisdiction of the urban-type settlement of Leninskoye of Shabalinsky District of Kirov Oblast
- Zavodskoy, Vsevolozhsky District, Leningrad Oblast, a logging depot settlement in Kuyvozovskoye Settlement Municipal Formation of Vsevolozhsky District of Leningrad Oblast
- Zavodskoy, Vyborgsky District, Leningrad Oblast, a logging depot settlement in Krasnoselskoye Settlement Municipal Formation of Vyborgsky District of Leningrad Oblast
- Zavodskoy, Lipetsk Oblast, a settlement in Dobrovsky Selsoviet of Dobrovsky District of Lipetsk Oblast
- Zavodskoy, Mari El Republic, a settlement under the administrative jurisdiction of the urban-type settlement of Mari-Turek of Mari-Tureksky District of the Mari El Republic
- Zavodskoy, Bessonovsky District, Penza Oblast, a settlement in Prokazninsky Selsoviet of Bessonovsky District of Penza Oblast
- Zavodskoy, Mokshansky District, Penza Oblast, a settlement in Chernozersky Selsoviet of Mokshansky District of Penza Oblast
- Zavodskoy, Zemetchinsky District, Penza Oblast, a settlement in Saltykovsky Selsoviet of Zemetchinsky District of Penza Oblast
- Zavodskoy, Tambov Oblast, a settlement in Novospassky Selsoviet of Pervomaysky District of Tambov Oblast
- Zavodskoy, Tomsk Oblast, a settlement in Parabelsky District of Tomsk Oblast
- Zavodskoy, Tver Oblast, a settlement in Kimrsky District of Tver Oblast
- Zavodskoy, Ulyanovsk Oblast, a settlement in Yedelevsky Rural Okrug of Kuzovatovsky District of Ulyanovsk Oblast
- Zavodskoy, Voronezh Oblast, a settlement in Semeno-Alexandrovskoye Rural Settlement of Bobrovsky District of Voronezh Oblast
- Zavodskoy, Yaroslavl Oblast, a settlement in Lyubilkovsky Rural Okrug of Rostovsky District of Yaroslavl Oblast

== Abolished inhabited localities ==
- Zavodskoy, Primorsky Krai, a former urban-type settlement in Primorsky Krai; since 2004—a part of the town of Artyom
- Zavodskoy, Rostov Oblast, a former urban-type settlement in Rostov Oblast; since 2005—a part of the town of Kamensk-Shakhtinsky
