= Zavodsky (rural locality) =

Zavodsky (Russian: Заво́дский; masculine), Zavodskaya (Заво́дская; feminine), or Zavodskoye (Заво́дское; neuter) is the name of several rural localities in Russia:

- Zavodskoye, Altai Krai, a selo in Zavodskoy Selsoviet of Troitsky District of Altai Krai
- Zavodskoye, Kabardino-Balkarian Republic, a selo in Tersky District of the Kabardino-Balkarian Republic
- Zavodskoye, Kaliningrad Oblast, a settlement in Ilyushinsky Rural Okrug of Nesterovsky District of Kaliningrad Oblast
- Zavodskoye, Kostroma Oblast, a village in Georgiyevskoye Settlement of Mezhevskoy District of Kostroma Oblast

== See also ==
- Zavodskoy (inhabited locality)
