= Digorsky District =

Digorsky District Дигорский район (Russian)
- District

Other transcription(s)
  - Ossetic: Дыгуры район
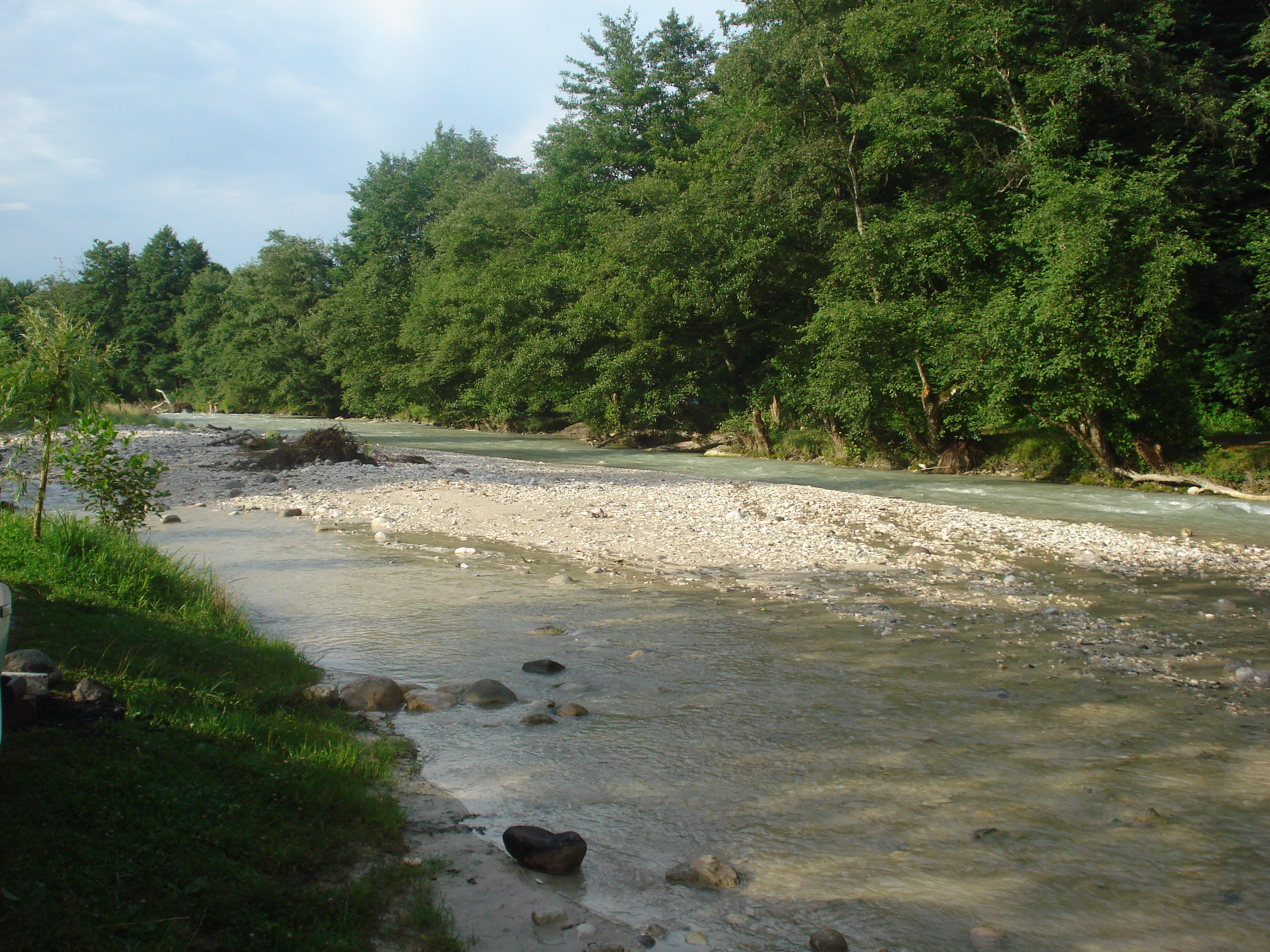
- The Ursdon River in Digorsky District
- Location of Digorsky District in the Republic of North Ossetia–Alania
- Coordinates: 43°09′29″N 44°09′25″E
- Country: Russia
- Federal subject: Republic of North Ossetia–Alania
- Administrative center: Digora

Area
  - Total: 640 km^{2} (250 sq mi)

Population (2010 Census)
  - Total: 19,334
  - Density: 30/km^{2} (78/sq mi)
  - Urban: 56.1%
  - Rural: 43.9%

Administrative structure
  - Administrative divisions: 1 Towns under district jurisdiction, 5 Rural okrugs
  - Inhabited localities: 1 cities/towns, 6 rural localities

Municipal structure
  - Municipally incorporated as: Digorsky Municipal District
  - Municipal divisions: 1 urban settlements, 5 rural settlements
- Time zone: UTC+3 (MSK)
- OKTMO ID: 90615000
- Website: http://digora.ru/

Digorsky District (Russian: Диго́рский райо́н; Iron Ossetic: Дигори район, romanized: Digori rajon) is an administrative and municipal district (raion), one of the eight in the Republic of North Ossetia–Alania, Russia. It is located in the west of the republic. The area of the district is 640 square kilometers (250 sq mi). Its administrative center is the town of Digora. Population: 19,334 (2010 census); 20,625 (2002 Census); 19,328 (1989 Soviet census). The population of Digora accounts for 56.1% of the district's total population.
