= Ardonsky District =

Ardonsky District Ардонский район (Russian)
- District

Other transcription(s)
  - Ossetic: Æрыдоны район
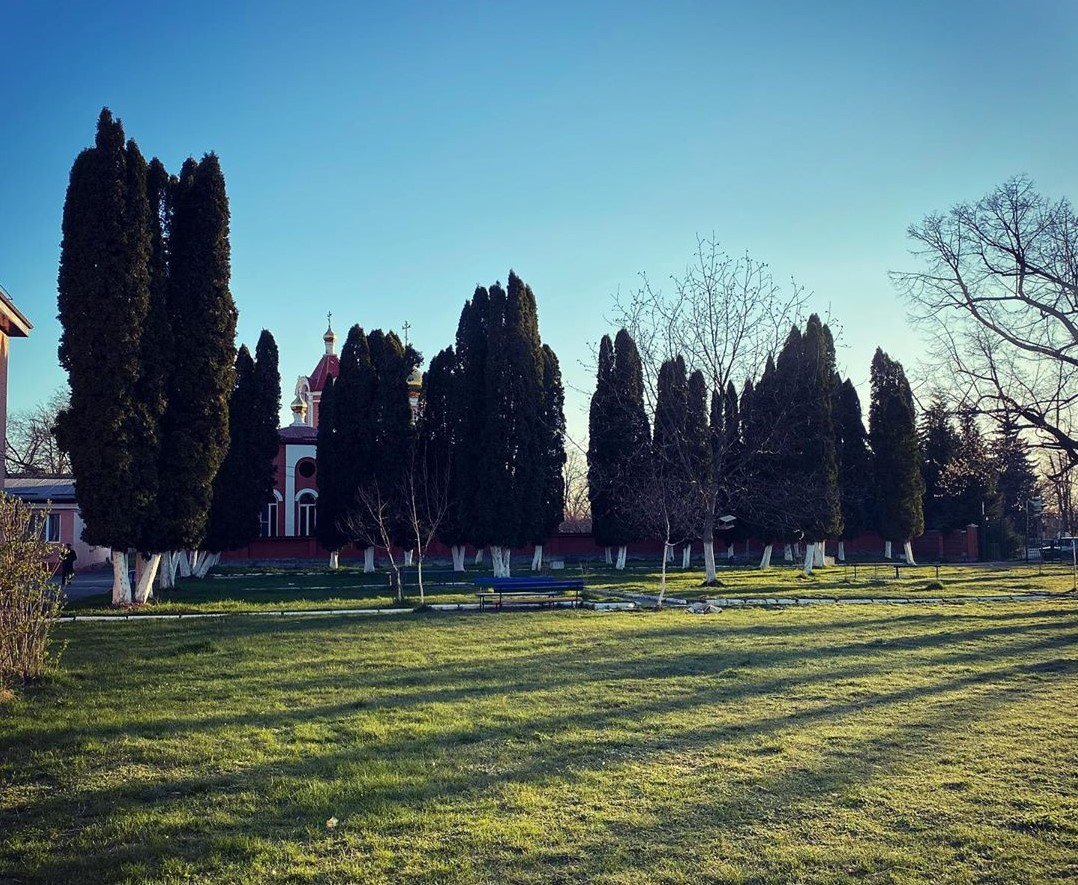

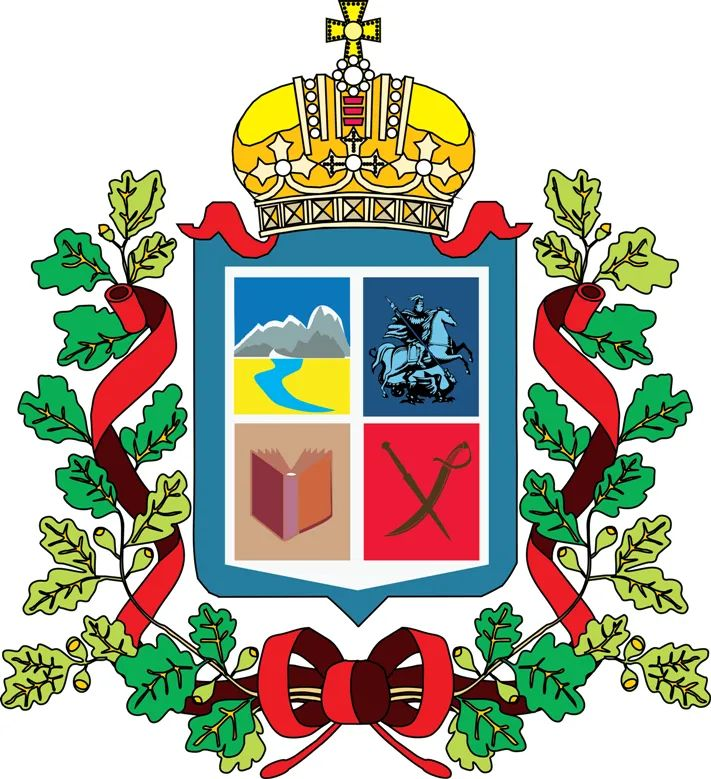
- Coat of arms
- Location of Ardonsky District in the Republic of North Ossetia–Alania
- Coordinates: 40°N 40°E
- Country: Russia
- Federal subject: Republic of North Ossetia–Alania
- Administrative center: Ardon

Area
  - Total: 376.5 km^{2} (145.4 sq mi)

Population (2010 Census)
  - Total: 30,685
  - Density: 81.50/km^{2} (211.1/sq mi)
  - Urban: 61.2%
  - Rural: 38.8%

Administrative structure
  - Administrative divisions: 1 Towns under district jurisdiction, 8 Rural okrugs
  - Inhabited localities: 1 cities/towns, 11 rural localities

Municipal structure
  - Municipally incorporated as: Ardonsky Municipal District
  - Municipal divisions: 1 urban settlements, 8 rural settlements
- Time zone: UTC+3 (MSK)
- OKTMO ID: 90610000

Ardonsky District (Russian: Ардо́нский райо́н; Iron Ossetic: Æрыдоны район, Ærydony rajon) is an administrative and municipal district (raion), one of the eight in the Republic of North Ossetia–Alania, Russia. It is located in the center of the republic. The area of the district is 376.5 square kilometers (145.4 sq mi). Its administrative center is the town of Ardon. Population: 30,685 (2010 census); 28,831 (2002 Census); 22,725 (1989 Soviet census). The population of Ardon accounts for 61.2% of the district's total population.

== Notable residents ==
- Alan Koroyev (born 1998 in Ardon), football player
