= Kirovsky District, North Ossetia–Alania =

Kirovsky District Кировский район (Russian)
- District

Other transcription(s)
  - Ossetic: Кировы район
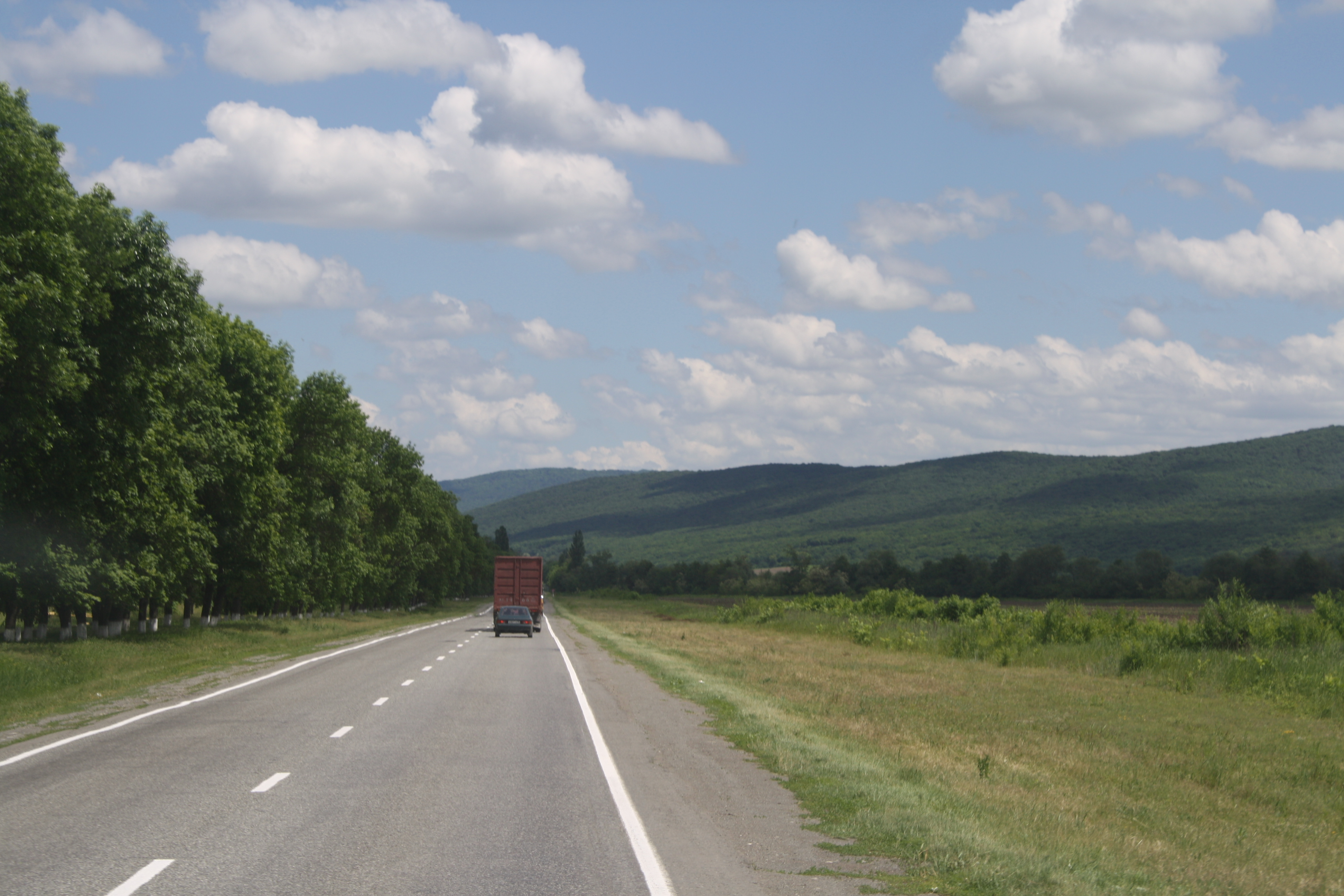
- Landscape in Kirovsky District

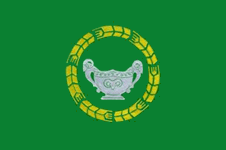
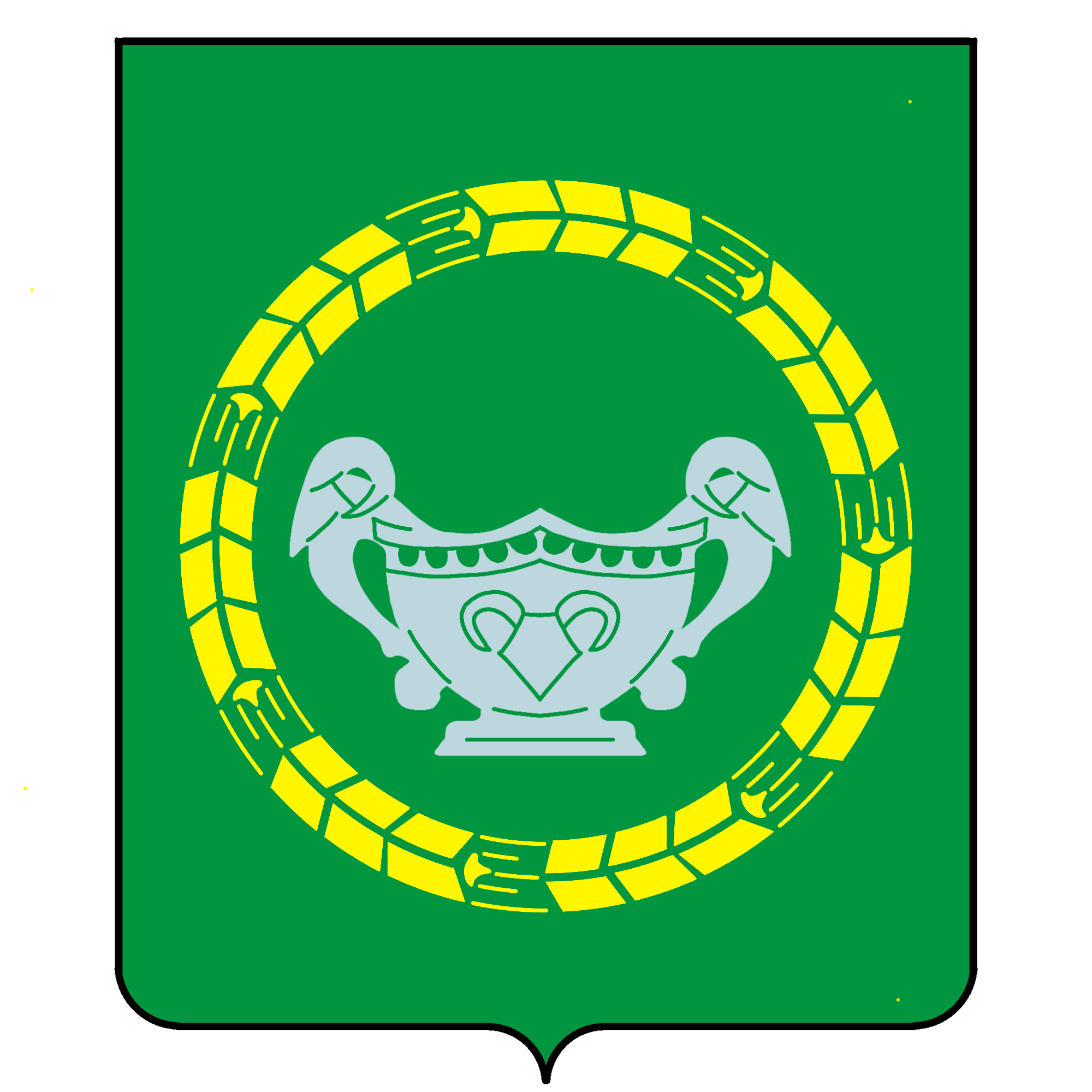
- Flag Coat of arms
- Location of Kirovsky District in the Republic of North Ossetia–Alania
- Coordinates: 43°20′N 44°12′E
- Country: Russia
- Federal subject: Republic of North Ossetia–Alania
- Established: 2 December 1934
- Administrative center: Elkhotovo

Area
  - Total: 360 km^{2} (140 sq mi)

Population (2010 Census)
  - Total: 27,807
  - Density: 77/km^{2} (200/sq mi)
  - Urban: 0%
  - Rural: 100%

Administrative structure
  - Administrative divisions: 7 rural okrug
  - Inhabited localities: 7 rural localities

Municipal structure
  - Municipally incorporated as: Kirovsky Municipal District
  - Municipal divisions: 0 urban settlements, 7 rural settlements
- Time zone: UTC+3 (MSK)
- OKTMO ID: 90625000
- Website: http://kirovski-raion.ru/

Kirovsky District (Russian: Ки́ровский райо́н; Iron Ossetic: Кировы район, Kirovy rajon) is an administrative and municipal district (raion), one of the eight in the Republic of North Ossetia–Alania, Russia. It is located in the north of the republic. The area of the district is 411 square kilometers (159 sq mi). Its administrative center is the rural locality (a selo) of Elkhotovo. Population: 27,807 (2010 census); 26,571 (2002 Census); 19,954 (1989 Soviet census). The population of Elkhotovo accounts for 45.4% of the district's total population.

== History ==
On 2 December 1934, by decision of the Bureau of the Regional Committee of the All-Union Communist Party of Bolsheviks of North Ossetia, on the basis of five village councils (Elkhotovsky, Stavd-Dortsky, Zmeysky, Iransky and Illarionovsky ), the Elkhotovsky District (Russian: Эльхотовский район, romanized: El'khotovskiy rayon; Iron Ossetic: Елхоты район, Elkhoty rajon) was formed, separated from the northwestern part of the Pravoberezhny District. On 17 March 1935, the Elkhotovsky District was renamed the Kirovsky District by the Decree of the Central Executive Committee of the USSR.

== Notable residents ==
- Chermen Kobesov (born 1996 in Elkhotovo), para-athlete
- Artur Pagayev (born 1971 in Kardzhin), football player and coach
