= Zavodskoy =

Zavodskoy may refer to:

- Zavodskoy City District, Russia, name of several city districts in Russia
- Zavodskoy (inhabited locality), name of several inhabited localities in Russia

== See also ==
- Zavodsky (disambiguation)
