= Zavodskoy, North Ossetia–Alania =

Zavodskoy Заводской
- Work settlement

Other transcription(s)
  - Ossetian: Заводы посёлок
- Interactive map of Zavodskoy
- Location of Zavodskoy Zavodskoy (North Ossetia–Alania)
- Coordinates: 43°06′03″N 44°38′57″E
- Country: Russia
- Federal subject: North Ossetia–Alania

Population (2010 Census)
  - Total: 16,792
  - Estimate (2025): 15,316 (−8.8%)

Administrative status
  - Subordinated to: town of krai significance of Vladikavkaz

Municipal status
  - Urban okrug: Vladikavkaz Urban Okrug
- Time zone: UTC+3 (MSK)
- Postal code: 362910
- OKTMO ID: 90701000056

Zavodskoy (Russian: Заводской, Iron Ossetic: Заводы посёлок, Zavody posjolok) is an urban locality (urban-type settlement) under the administrative jurisdiction of Promyshlenny City District of the town of republican significance of Vladikavkaz, the Republic of North Ossetia-Alania, Russia. Population: 16,792 (2010 census); 14,574 (2002 census); 11,260 (1989 Soviet census).
