= Ardon, North Ossetia–Alania =

Town in the Republic of North Ossetia-Alania, Russia

Ardon Ардон
- Town

Other transcription(s)
  - Ossetic: Æрыдон
- Interactive map of Ardon
- Location of Ardon Ardon (North Ossetia–Alania)
- Coordinates: 43°11′N 44°19′E
- Country: Russia
- Federal subject: North Ossetia–Alania
- Administrative district: Ardonsky District
- Town Under District JurisdictionSelsoviet: Ardon
- Founded: 1824
- Town status since: 1964
- Elevation: 420 m (1,380 ft)

Population (2010 Census)
  - Total: 18,774
  - Estimate (2023): 18,915 (+0.8%)

Administrative status
  - Capital of: Ardonsky District, Ardon Town Under District Jurisdiction

Municipal status
  - Municipal district: Ardonsky Municipal District
  - Urban settlement: Ardonskoye Urban Settlement
  - Capital of: Ardonsky Municipal District, Ardonskoye Urban Settlement
- Time zone: UTC+3 (MSK)
- Postal code: 363330–363334
- OKTMO ID: 90610101001

Ardon population
- 2010 Census: 18,774
- 2002 Census: 17,521
- 1989 Census: 13,536
- 1979 Census: 12,857

Ardon (Russian: Ардо́н; Iron Ossetic: Æрыдон, Ærydon) is a town and the administrative center of Ardonsky District in the Republic of North Ossetia-Alania, Russia, located in the center of the republic on the west bank of the Ardon River, 39 kilometers (24 mi) northwest of the republic's capital Vladikavkaz. As of the 2010 Census, its population was 18,774.

== History ==
It was founded in 1824 and was granted town status in 1964.

== Administrative and municipal status ==
Within the framework of administrative divisions, Ardon serves as the administrative center of Ardonsky District. As an administrative division, it is, together with two rural localities (the settlements of Bekan and Stepnoy), incorporated within Ardonsky District as Ardon Town Under District Jurisdiction. As a municipal division, the town of Ardon and the settlement of Bekan (but not the settlement of Stepnoy) are incorporated within Ardonsky Municipal District as Ardonskoye Urban Settlement.

== Economy ==
The town is an important road and rail junction at the head of a branch line to the southern town of Alagir. It grew significantly in the 1960s, transforming into an industrial-agricultural hub with a cannery, a hemp processing factory, and other facilities for food and agricultural processing.

== Notable people ==
- Diana Avsaragova, Russian mixed martial artist (Bellator Fighting Championships)
