= Digora =

Town in the Republic of North Ossetia-Alania, Russia

Digora Дигора
- Town

Other transcription(s)
  - Ossetic: Дигорæ
- Interactive map of Digora
- Location of Digora Digora (North Ossetia–Alania)
- Coordinates: 43°09′29″N 44°09′25″E
- Country: Russia
- Federal subject: North Ossetia–Alania
- Administrative district: Digorsky District
- Town Under District JurisdictionSelsoviet: Digora
- Founded: 1852
- Town status since: 1964
- Elevation: 450 m (1,480 ft)

Population (2010 Census)
  - Total: 10,856
  - Estimate (2023): 9,994 (−7.9%)

Administrative status
  - Capital of: Digorsky District, Digora Town Under District Jurisdiction

Municipal status
  - Municipal district: Digorsky Municipal District
  - Urban settlement: Digorskoye Urban Settlement
  - Capital of: Digorsky Municipal District, Digorskoye Urban Settlement
- Time zone: UTC+3 (MSK)
- Postal code: 363410
- Dialing code: +7 86733
- OKTMO ID: 90615101001

Digora population
- 2010 Census: 10,856
- 2002 Census: 11,819
- 1989 Census: 10,875
- 1979 Census: 10,642

Digora (Russian: Дигора́; Iron Ossetic: Дигорæ, Digoræ) is a town and the administrative center of Digorsky District of the Republic of North Ossetia–Alania, Russia, located on the Ursdon River (left tributary of the Terek), 49 kilometers (30 mi) northwest of the republic's capital Vladikavkaz. As of the 2010 Census, its population was 10,856.

== History ==
Founded in 1852 as the aul of Volno-Khristianovsky (Во́льно-Христиа́новский) and later renamed the selo of Novokhristianovskoye (Новохристиа́новское) and Khristianovskoye (Христиа́новское), it was finally given its present name in 1934. It was granted town status in 1964.

== Administrative and municipal status ==
Within the framework of administrative divisions, Digora serves as the administrative center of Digorsky District. As an administrative division, it is incorporated within Digorsky District as Digora Town Under District Jurisdiction. As a municipal division, Digora Town Under District Jurisdiction is incorporated within Digorsky Municipal District as Digorskoye Urban Settlement.

== Notable people ==
- Akhsarbek Abaev – Red Army sergeant and Hero of the Soviet Union
- Mykola Bagrayev – Ukrainian businessman
- Alan Gogaev – wrestler
- Artur Akoyev – weightlifter
