= Zavodsky =

Zavodsky (masculine), Zavodskaya (feminine), or Zavodskoye (neuter) may refer to:

- Zavodsky City District (disambiguation), name of several city districts in the countries of the former Soviet Union
- Zavodsky (rural locality) (Zavodskaya, Zavodskoye), name of several rural localities in Russia
- Zavodskaya, a station of the Kazan Metro (Kazan, Russia) planned for opening in 2012
