= North Ossetia–Alania =

Republic of Russia in the North Caucasus

Republic of North Ossetia–Alania Республика Северная Осетия — Алания (Russian)
- Republic

Other transcription(s)
  - Ossetic: Республикӕ Цӕгат Ирыстон/Иристон — Алани
- Flag Coat of arms
- Anthem: "Цӕгат Ирыстоны паддзахадон гимн" (Iron Ossetic) (English: "State Anthem of the Republic of North Ossetia–Alania")
- Interactive map of Republic of North Ossetia–Alania
- Location within European Russia
- Coordinates: 43°11′N 44°14′E
- Country: Russia
- Federal district: North Caucasian
- Economic region: North Caucasus
- Established: 5 December 1936
- Capital: Vladikavkaz

Government
  - Body: Parliament
  - Head: Sergey Menyaylo

Area
  - Total: 7,987 km^{2} (3,084 sq mi)
  - Rank: 79th

Population (2021 census)
  - Total: 687,357: 68.1% Ossetians; 18.9% Russians; 3.8% Ingushs; 2.8% Kumyks; 1.8% Armenians; 1% Georgians; 3.6% other
  - Estimate (2018): 701,765
  - Rank: 63rd
  - Density: 86.06/km^{2} (222.9/sq mi)
  - Urban: 63.8%
  - Rural: 36.2%

GDP (nominal, 2024)
  - Total: ₽267 billion (US$3.13 billion)
  - Per capita: ₽392,102 (US$4,601)
- Time zone: UTC+3 (MSK)
- ISO 3166 code: RU-SE
- License plates: 15
- OKTMO ID: 90000000
- Official languages: Russian; Ossetic
- Website: www.rso-a.ru

North Ossetia–Alania, (Note: Russian: Северная Осетия, romanized: Severnaya Osetiya; Iron Ossetic: Цæгат Ирыстон/Иристон, romanized: Cægat Iryston/Iriston) officially the Republic of North Ossetia–Alania, (Note: Russian: Республика Северная Осетия — Алания, romanized: Respublika Severnaya Osetiya — Alaniya, Russian pronunciation: [rʲɪˈspublʲɪkə ˈsʲevʲɪrnəjə ɐˈsʲetʲɪjə ɐˈlanʲɪjə]; Iron Ossetic: Республикӕ Цӕгат Ирыстон/Иристон — Алани, romanized: Respublikæ Cægat Iryston/Iriston — Alani, IPA: [resˈpublikə t͡səˈgät iɾɨˈʃton/iɾiʃton äˈläni]; Ingush: Республика Гӏинбухера Хӏирийче — Аланойче, romanized: Republika Ghinbukhera Hiriyche — Alanoyche) is a republic of Russia situated in the North Caucasus of Eastern Europe. It borders the country of Georgia (South Ossetia) to the south, and the Russian federal subjects of Kabardino-Balkaria to the west, Stavropol Krai to the north, Chechnya to the east and Ingushetia to the southeast. Its population according to the 2021 Census was 687,357. The republic’s capital city is Vladikavkaz, located on the foothills of the Caucasus Mountains.

The majority of the republic's population (68.1% as of 2021) are Ossetians, an Iranian ethnic group native to the republic and neighboring South Ossetia. Ossetian is an east Iranian language descended from the medieval Alanic and ancient Sarmatian languages. Unlike many ethnic groups in the North Caucasus, the majority of Ossetians are Christians, predominantly Eastern Orthodox. Almost 30% of the population adheres to Ossetian ethnic religion, generally called Uatsdin (Уацдин, "True Faith"), and there is a sizable Muslim minority. Ethnic Russians and Ingush, who form a majority in neighboring Ingushetia, form substantial minorities in the republic.

The Ossetia region traces its history back to the ancient Alans, who founded the Kingdom of Alania in the 8th century and adopted Christianity in the 9th century. The kingdom would fall to the Mongols in the 13th century. From 1774 to 1806, Ossetia was slowly incorporated into the Russian Empire, which would split the region into a northern part included in the Terek Oblast, and a southern one included in the Tiflis and Kutaisi governorates. This partition would persist in the Soviet period, when North Ossetia was made into the Mountain Autonomous Soviet Socialist Republic within the Russian SFSR, while South Ossetia became an autonomous oblast within the Georgian SSR.

Following the dissolution of the Soviet Union, the republic experienced internal conflict like in much of the North Caucasus. In 1992, a brief ethnic war between Ossetians and the predominantly Muslim Ingush population in the Prigorodny District took place. The republic has experienced spillover from the Chechen conflict, most notably in the form of the 2004 Beslan school siege. Proposals for Russia to annex South Ossetia in order to incorporate the two as one entity exist to this day.

Ossetian cuisine is distinguished as an integral aspect of Ossetian culture. Ossetian-style pies such as Fydzhin (a meat pie) are a quintessential component of Ossetian cuisine. The "three pies" concept holds special symbolic significance, and representing the Sun, Earth, and water.

== Name ==
In the last years of the Soviet Union, as nationalist movements swept throughout the Caucasus, many intellectuals in the North Ossetian ASSR called for the revival of the name of Alania, a medieval kingdom of the Alans.

The term "Alania" quickly became popular in Ossetian daily life through the names of various enterprises, TV channels, political and civic organizations, publishing house, football team, etc. In November 1994, the name "Alania" was officially added to the republic’s title (Republic of North Ossetia–Alania).

== History ==
Caucasus region in 1060

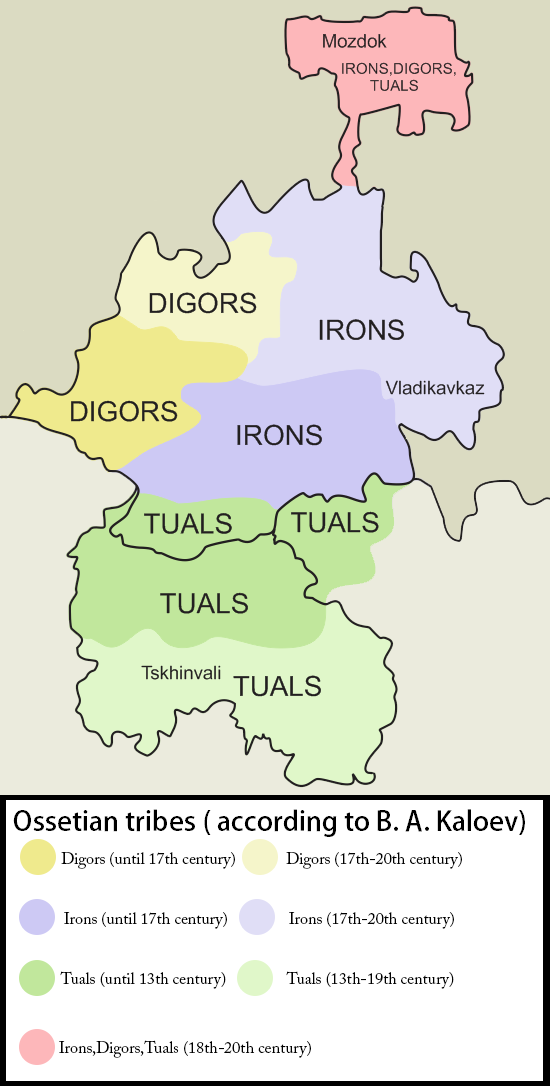
Ossetian tribes (both North and South) according to B. A. Kaloyev.

=== Early history: Kingdom of Alania and Middle Ages ===
According to Georgian sources, the Iberians and the ancestors of the Ossetians established contacts during the Iberian–Armenian War

Alania greatly profited from the Silk Road which passed through its territory.

According to the 10th-century historian Al-Masudi, indicates that the Alan kingdom stretched from Dagestan to Abkhazia.

In the 13th century the Mongols invaded Alania. In 1220, Genghis Khan sent his military leaders Subutai and Jebe on a campaign to reach “eleven countries and peoples”, among which were “Kibchayts” (Kipchak Turks), “Orosut” (Kievan Rus), “Serkesut” (Circassia), “Asut” (Alania).

In 1239 the capital of Alania, Maghas, and other cities were destroyed. After these events the Alans were forced to flee to the mountain gorges and leave the flat lands. Islam was introduced to the region in the 17th century by Kabardians.

=== Russian imperial rule (1806–1917) ===
Conflicts between the Khanate of Crimea and the Ottoman Empire eventually pushed Ossetia into an alliance with Imperial Russia in the 18th century. Soon, Russia established a military base in the capital, Vladikavkaz, making it the first Russian-controlled area in the northern Caucasus. The Georgian Military Road, which is still a crucial transport link across the mountains, was built in 1799 and a railway line was built from Vladikavkaz to Rostov-on-Don in Russia proper. In 1830, a military campaign led by General Ivane Abkhazi brought North Ossetia under tighter control of the Russian Empire. By 1830, Ossetia was under complete Russian control.

The Russians’ rule led to rapid development of industry and railways which overcame its isolation. The first books from the area came during the late 18th century, and became part of the Terskaya Region of Russia in the mid-19th century.

An estimated 50,000 Ossetians left the Caucasus during the early 1860s as part of a greater migration of Muslims from the region to the Ottoman Empire due to Russia's activities there.

=== Soviet period (1917–1990) ===
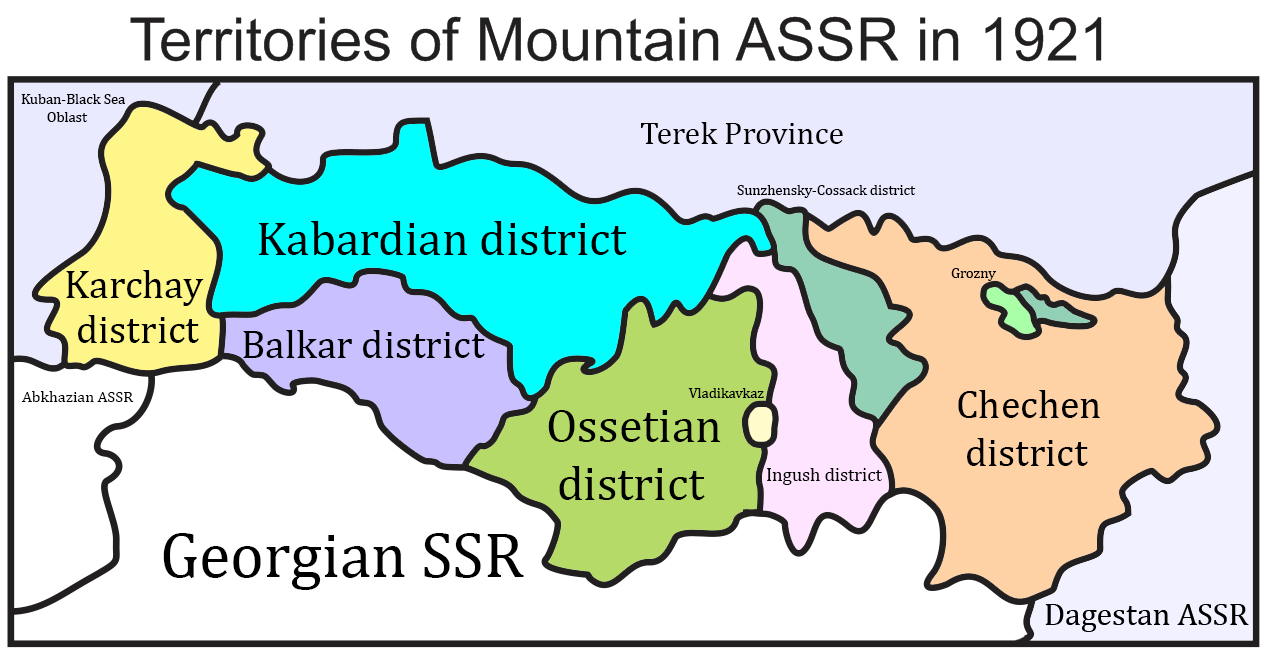
Border changes after World War I

The Russian Revolution of 1917 resulted in North Ossetia being merged into the Mountain Autonomous Soviet Socialist Republic in 1921. It then became the North Ossetian Autonomous Oblast on 7 July 1924, then merged into the North Ossetian Autonomous Soviet Socialist Republic on 5 December 1936. In World War II, it was subject to a number of attacks by Nazi German invaders unsuccessfully trying to seize Vladikavkaz in 1942.

The North Ossetian ASSR declared itself the autonomous republic of the Soviet Union on 20 June 1990. Its name was changed to the Republic of North Ossetia–Alania in 1994.

=== Russian Federation period (1990–present) ===
The dissolution of the Soviet Union posed particular problems for the Ossetian people, who were divided between North Ossetia, which was part of the Russian SFSR, and South Ossetia, part of the Georgian SSR. In December 1990, the Supreme Soviet of the Georgian SSR abolished the autonomous Ossetian enclave amid the rising ethnic tensions in the region, which was further fanned by Moscow; a lot of the conflict zone population, faced with the ethnic cleansing, was forced to flee across the border to either North Ossetia or Georgia proper.

Due to the large number of weapons in the hands of the Ossetian and Ingush population, the Ossetian-Ingush conflict flared up, due to which from 30,000 to 60,000 Ingush were forced to leave North Ossetia. On 23 March 1995, North Ossetia–Alania signed a power-sharing agreement with the federal government, granting it autonomy. However, this agreement was abolished on 2 September 2002.

Following the de facto independence of South Ossetia, there have been proposals in this state of joining Russia and uniting with North Ossetia. As well as dealing with the effects of the conflict in South Ossetia, North Ossetia has had to deal with refugees and the occasional spillover of fighting from the wars around them. This notably manifested in the form of the 2004 Beslan school siege by Chechen terrorists.

== Geography ==
The republic is located in the North Caucasus. The northern part of the republic is situated in the Stavropol Plain. 22% of the republic’s territory is covered by forests.

- Area: 8,000 square kilometers (3,100 sq mi)
- Borders:
  - internal: Kabardino-Balkaria (W/NW/N), Stavropol Krai (N), Chechnya (NE/E), Ingushetia (E/SE)
  - international: Georgia (including South Ossetia; Mtskheta-Mtianeti, Racha-Lechkhumi and Kvemo Svaneti and Shida Kartli) (SE/S/SW)
- Highest point: Mount Kazbek (5,033 meters (16,512 ft))
- Maximum north–south distance: 130 kilometers (81 mi)
- Maximum east–west distance: 120 kilometers (75 mi)

=== Rivers ===
All of the republic’s rivers belong to the drainage basin of the Terek River. Major rivers include:

- Terek River (~600 km)
- Urukh River (104 km)
- Ardon River (101 km)
- Kambileyevka River (99 km)
- Gizeldon River (81 km)
- Fiagdon River (75 km)
- Sunzha River (278 km)

=== Mountains ===
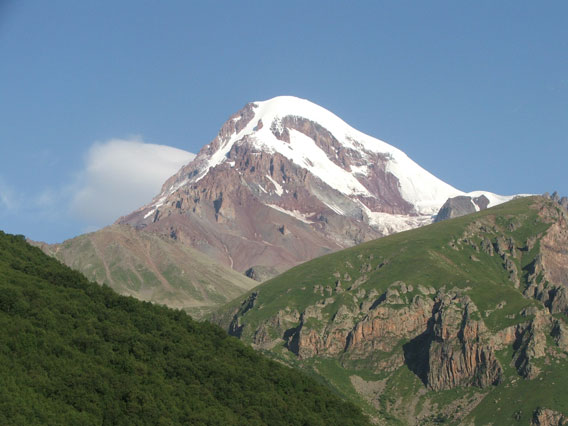
Mount Kazbek

All of the mountains located on the territory of the republic are a part of the Caucasus. Mount Kazbek is the highest point (5,033 m), with Mount Jimara being the second-highest (4,780 m).

=== Natural resources ===
Natural resources include minerals (copper, silver, zinc), timber, mineral waters, hydroelectric power, and untapped reserves of oil and gas.

=== Climate ===
The climate is moderately continental.

- Average January temperature: −5 °C (23 °F)
- Average July temperature: +24 °C (75 °F)
- Average annual precipitation: 400–700 millimeters (16–28 in) in the plains; over 1,000 millimeters (39 in) in the mountains.

== Politics ==
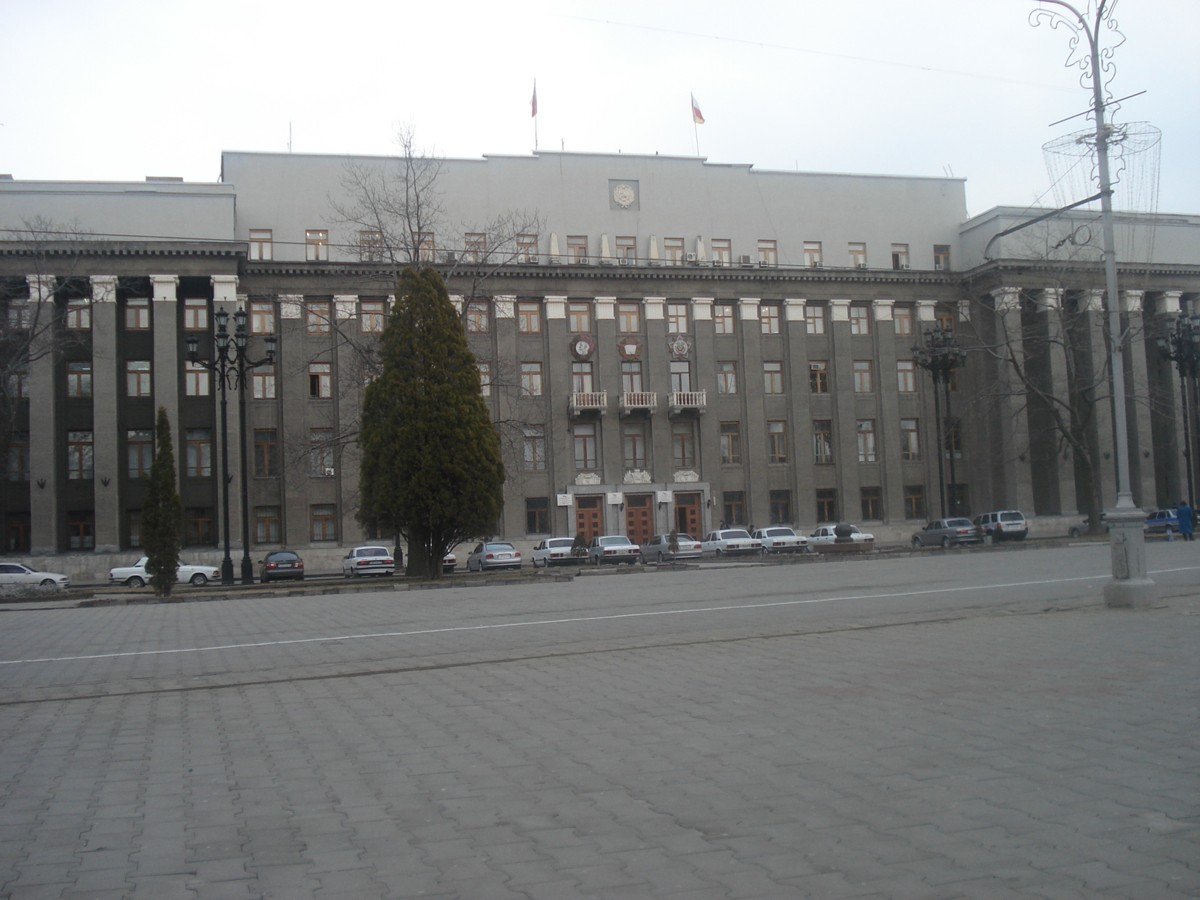
Seat of the Republic’s Government

During the Soviet period, the high authority in the republic was shared between three people; the first secretary of the North Ossetia Communist Party of the Soviet Union (CPSU) Committee (who in reality had the biggest authority), the chairman of the oblast Soviet (legislative power), and the Chairman of the Republic Executive Committee (executive power). Since 1991, CPSU lost all the power, and the head of the Republic administration, and eventually the governor was appointed/elected alongside elected regional parliament.

The Charter of the Republic of North Ossetia–Alania is the fundamental law of the region. The Parliament of North Ossetia–Alania is the republic’s regional standing legislative (representative) body. The Legislative Assembly exercises its authority by passing laws, resolutions, and other legal acts and by supervising the implementation and observance of the laws and other legal acts passed by it. The highest executive body is the Republic’s Government, which includes territorial executive bodies such as district administrations, committees, and commissions that facilitate development and run the day to day matters of the province. The Oblast administration supports the activities of the Governor who is the highest official and acts as guarantor of the observance of the krai Charter in accordance with the Constitution of Russia.

The head of government in the Republic of North Ossetia–Alania is the Head of the Republic. The current head of the republic is Sergey Menyaylo. Taymuraz Mamsurov succeeded Aleksandr Dzasokhov as head on 31 May 2005 following the Beslan school siege.

=== Administrative divisions ===
Modern map of the Republic of North Ossetia–Alania

== Economy ==
In recent years, North Ossetia–Alania’s economic development has been successful; the indicators of the republic’s social and economic development between 2005 and 2007 revealed a stable growth of all sectors of the economy and major social parameters. The nature and climatic conditions of the republic contribute to the successful development of various economic sectors, which is compounded by the abundance of natural resources. Gross regional product pro capita of the region in 2006 was 61,000 rubles ($2,596) and increased 30% in the 2005–2007 time period. GRP pro capita in 2007 was 76,455 rubles. From 2005 to 2007, the average monthly wage in North Ossetia–Alania doubled, with the actual cash earnings increased by 42.5 percent. In terms of the average monthly wage growth, the Republic ranks first in the North Caucasus.

The regional government’s economic priorities include industrial growth, development of small enterprise, spas, and resorts, and strengthening the budgetary and tax discipline.

The largest companies in the region include Elektrozinc, Sevkavkazenergo, Pobedit (tungsten and molybdenum producer).

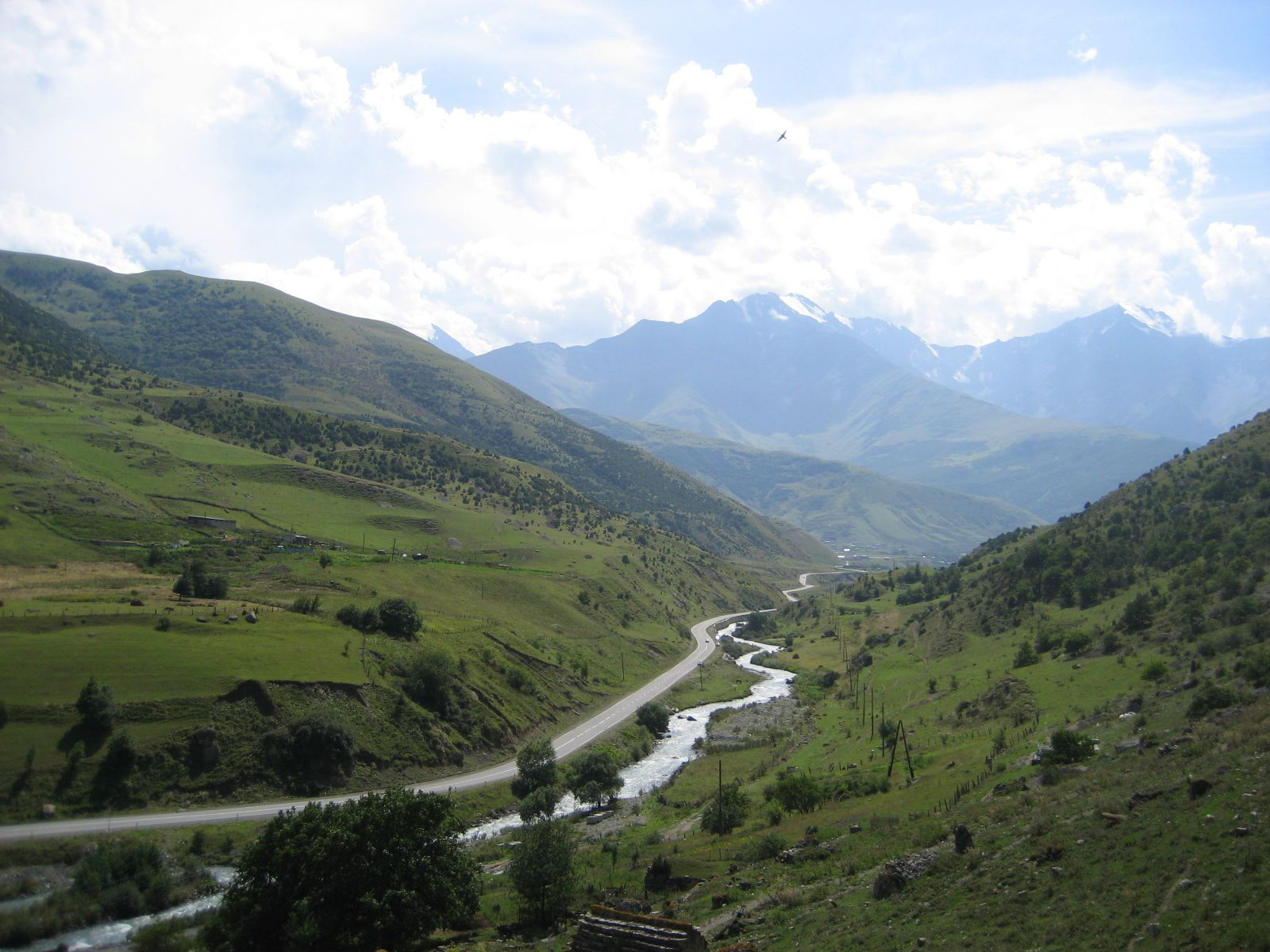
River Fiagdon

=== Natural resources, agriculture, and industry ===
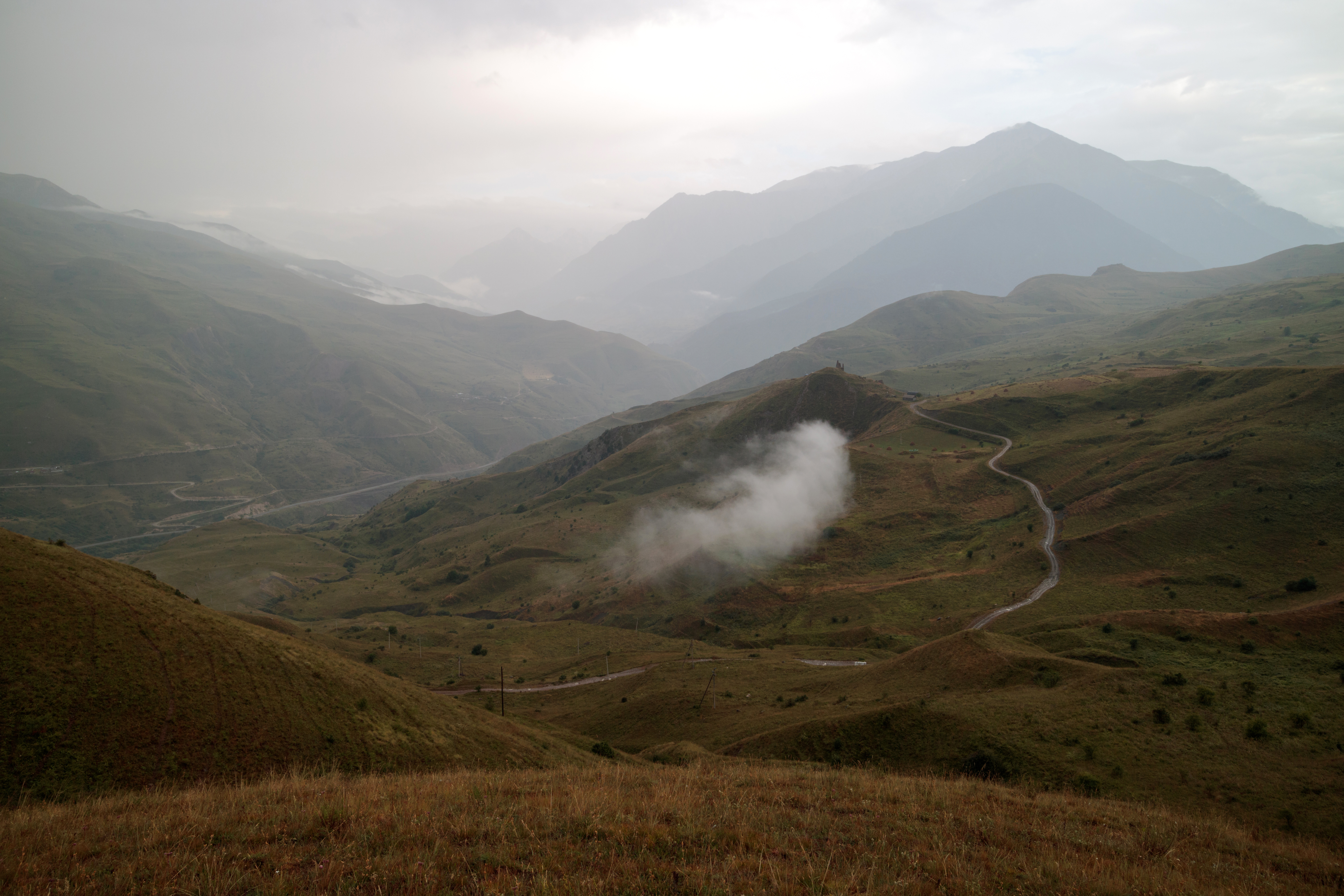
Urukh River Valley

The most widespread resources are zinc- and lead-containing complex ores. There are deposits of limestone, dolomites, marble, and touchstone. There is also a large availability of construction materials, such as clay, sand, and gravel. The local oil deposit reserves are estimated at 10 million metric tons.

The agricultural sector is varied and specializes in the cultivation of wheat, corn, and sunflowers; horticulture; viticulture; and cattle and sheep breeding.

North Ossetia’s industry is mainly concentrated in Vladikavkaz. Major companies located here include Elektrotsink, Gazoapparat, an instrument-making plant, Elektrokontraktor, a factory producing automotive electrical equipment, a large-panel construction complex, and companies in the food industry. The Sadonsky industrial center has grown around the mining and forest industries.

=== Tourism ===
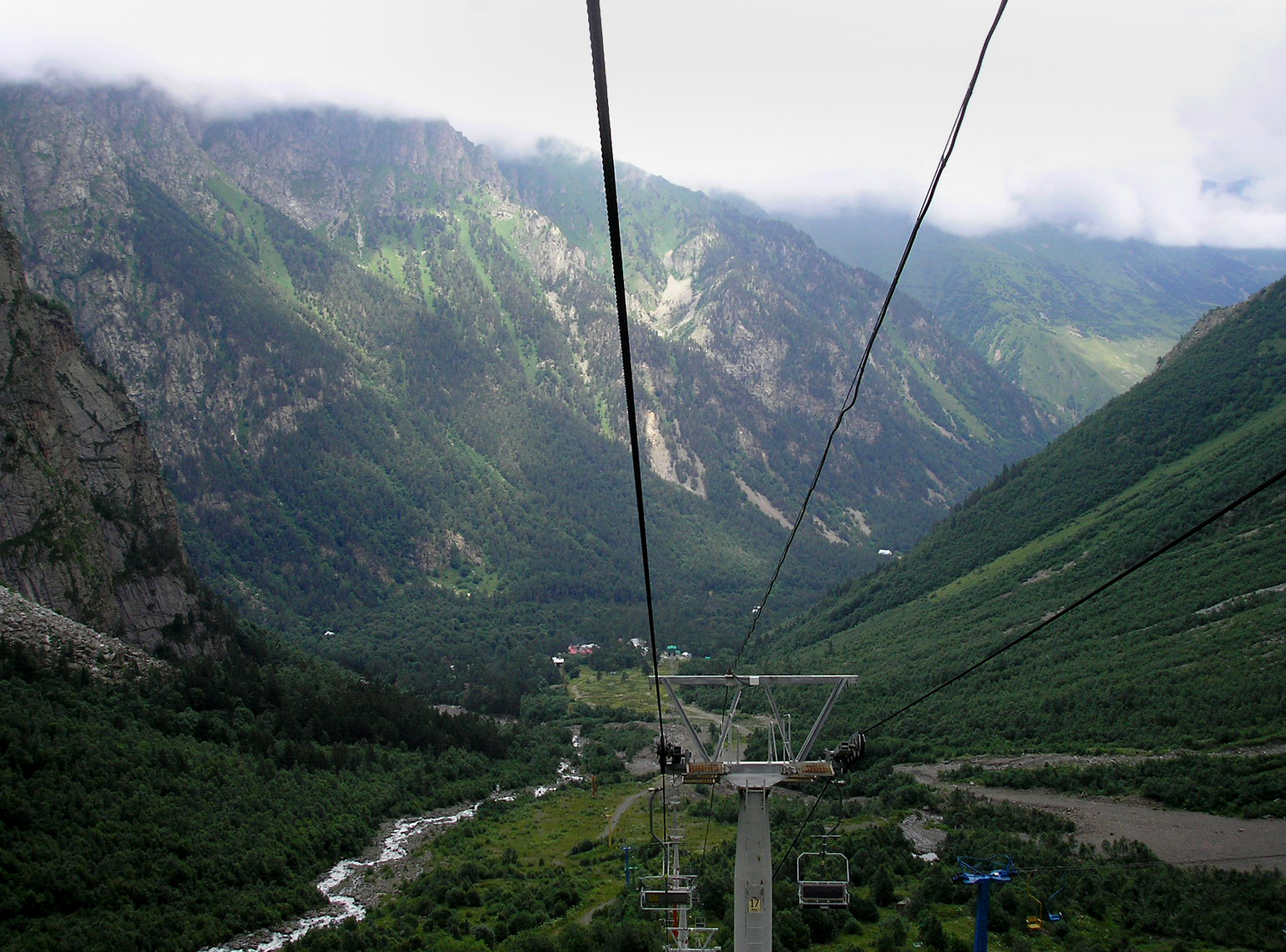
Cableway in Tsey canyon

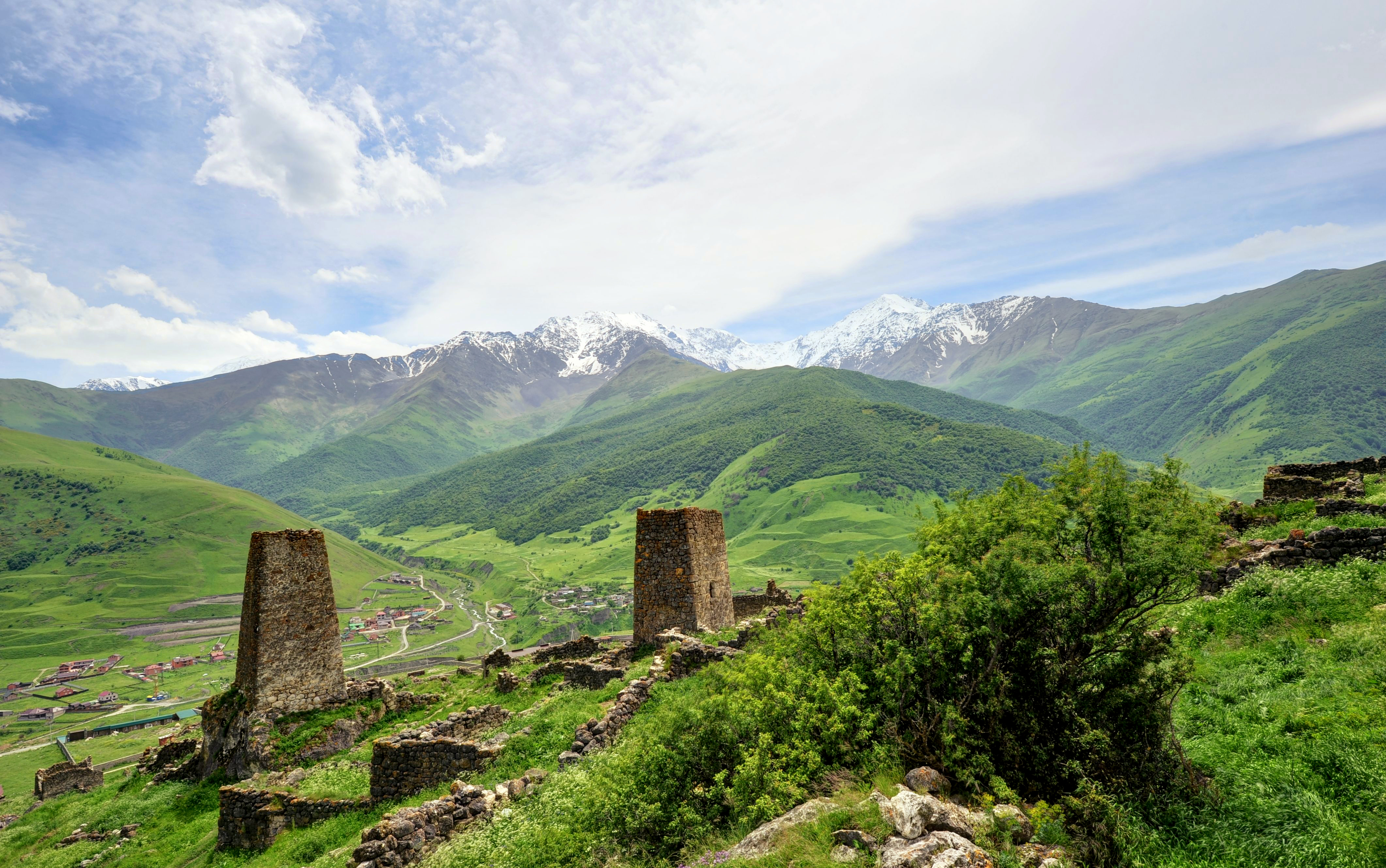
Kurtat valley

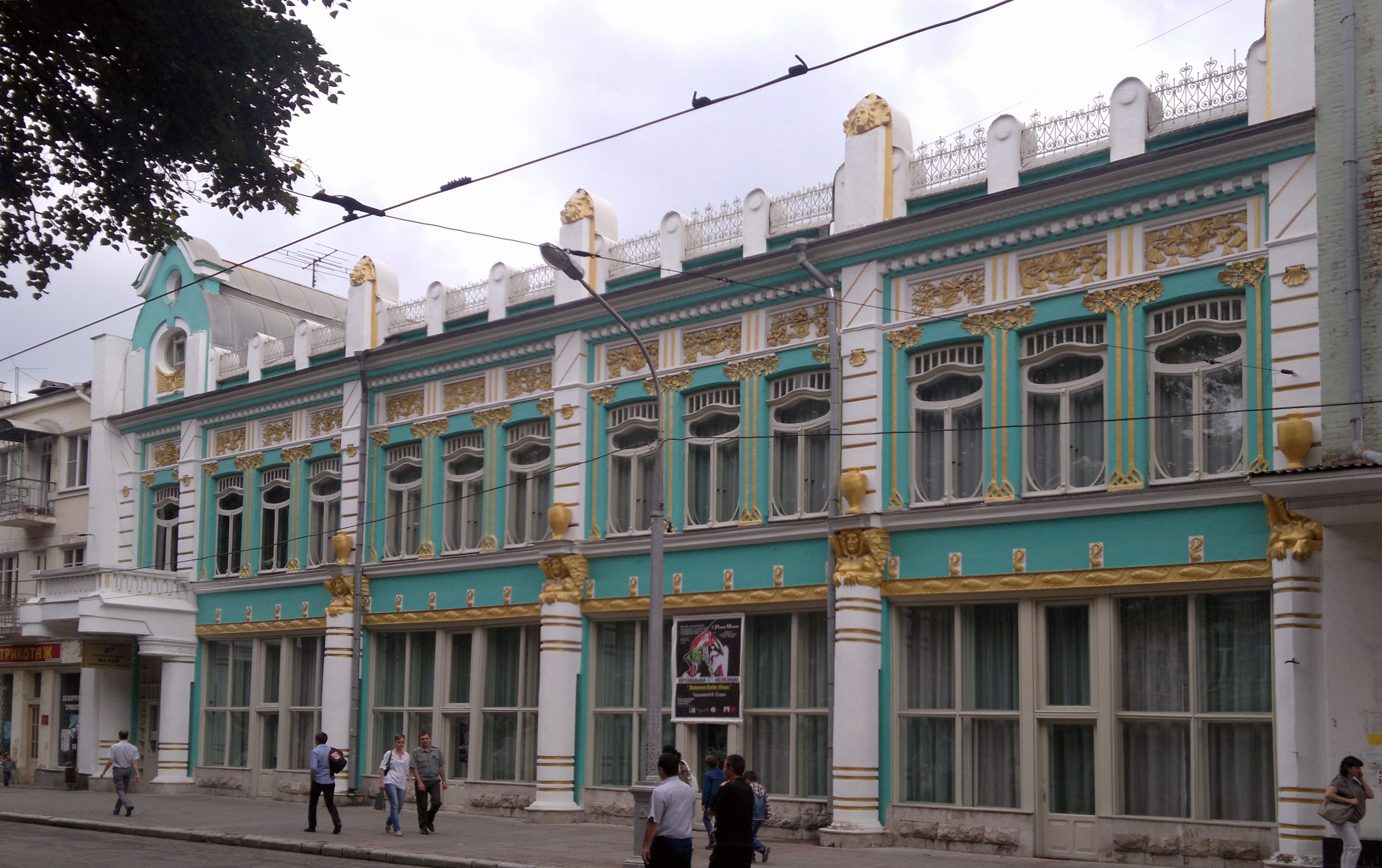
M. Tuganov Art Museum in Vladikavkaz

Despite the proximity to Chechnya, North Ossetia is making efforts to develop its tourist industry. Projects under a program for spa, resort, and tourism development have been successfully implemented in the mountainous part of the republic, according to the head of the regional government. There are nearly 3,000 historical monuments in the Republic and more than half of its area is occupied by Alania National Park, the North Ossetia National Preserve, and game preserves.

There are more than 250 therapeutic, mineral, and freshwater springs in the republic with estimated daily reserves of 15,000 cubic meters. Besides providing the basis for health spas, these mineral waters also have the potential to be bottled and sold. North Ossetian mineral waters are known for their unique qualities, as well as special mineral composition.

=== Infrastructure ===
In terms of its infrastructure, North Ossetia–Alania ranks second in the Southern Federal District and 10th in the nation. The republic has some of the most extensive telecommunication networks in the North Caucasus region and in Russia. It ranks first in terms of its telecom network installations in the Southern Federal District.

The republic ranks fourth in Russia in terms of its paved roads, and its expanding transport and logistics complex provides communication networks between Russia and the South Caucasus, as well as Central Asia. The complex includes two federal highways (Georgian Military Road connects Vladikavkaz with Transcaucasia) running across the Greater Caucasus Range, two customs checkpoints for cars, a developed railway network, Vladikavkaz international airport, and well-equipped transport terminals.

== Demographics ==
Population: 687,357 (2021 census); 712,980 (2010 census); 710,275 (2002 census); 634,009 (1989 Soviet census).

Historical population
Year	Pop.	±%
1926	226,033	—
1959	450,581	+99.3%
1970	552,581	+22.6%
1979	596,921	+8.0%
1989	634,009	+6.2%
2002	710,275	+12.0%
2010	712,980	+0.4%
2021	687,357	−3.6%
Source: Census data

Number of refugees: 12,570

Life expectancy:

	2019	2021
Average:	75.8 years	72.5 years
Male:	70.5 years	68.1 years
Female:	80.6 years	76.5 years

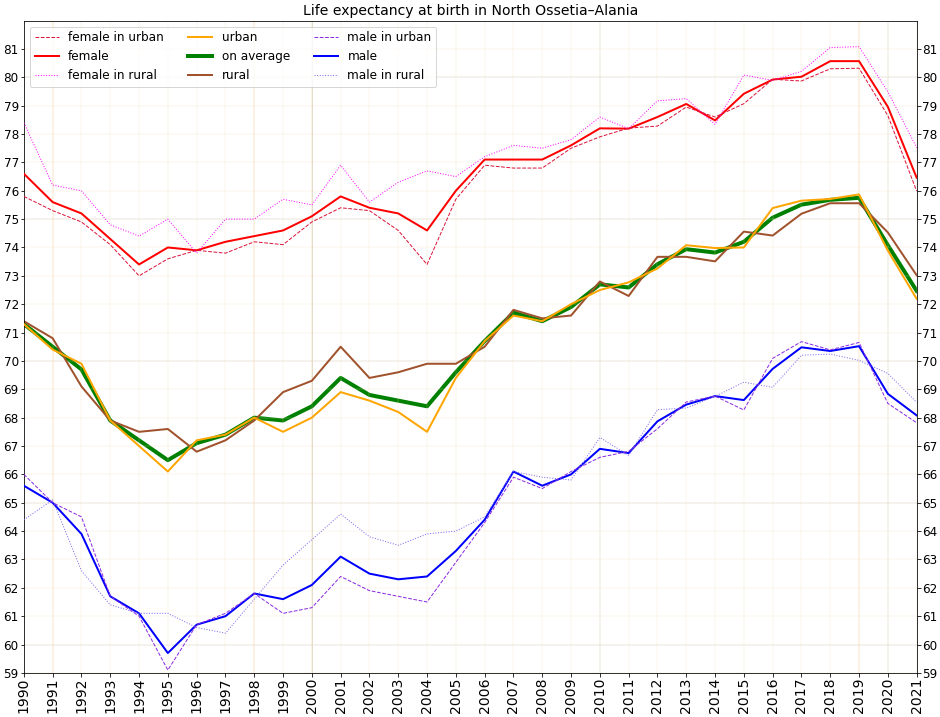
Life expectancy at birth in North Ossetia

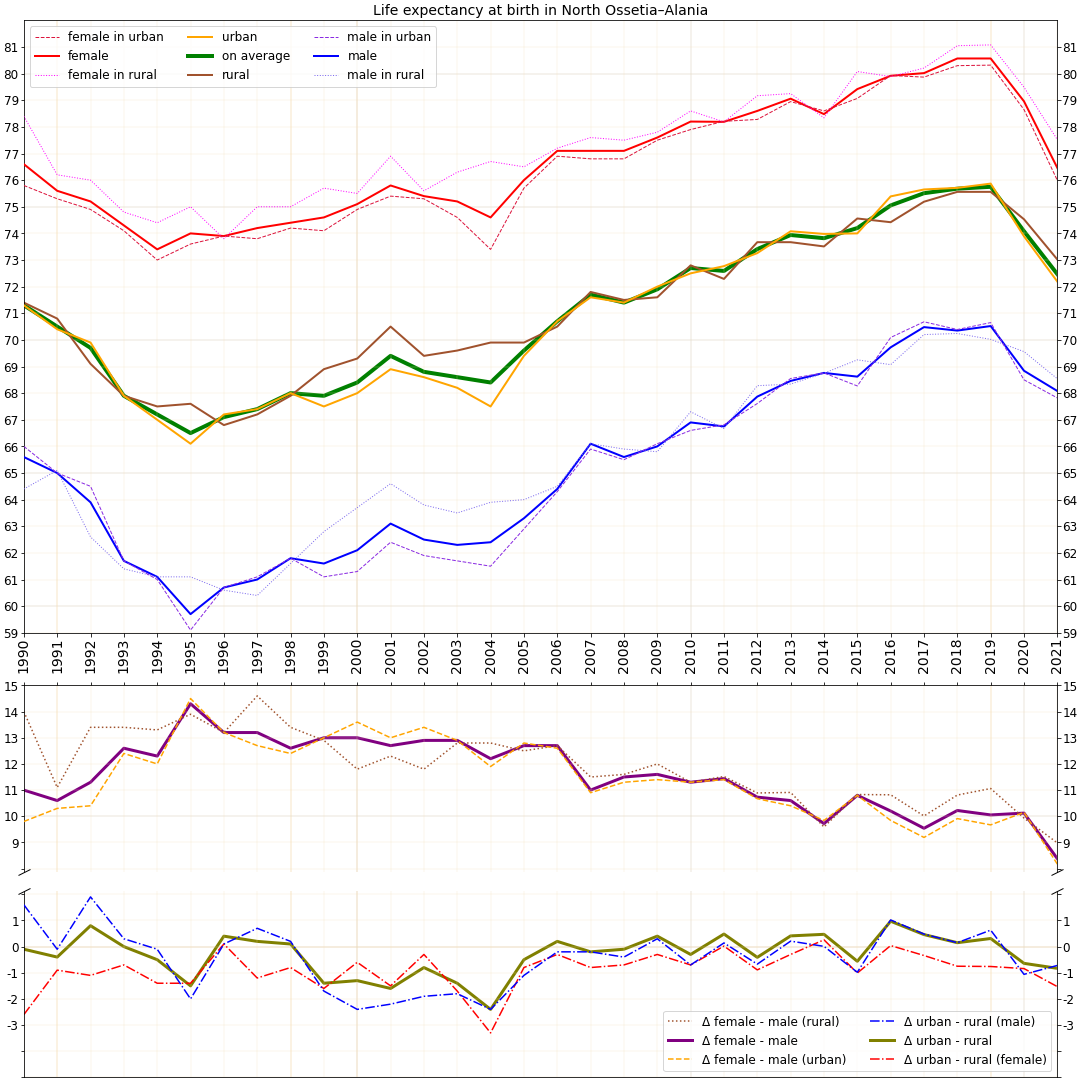
Life expectancy with calculated differences

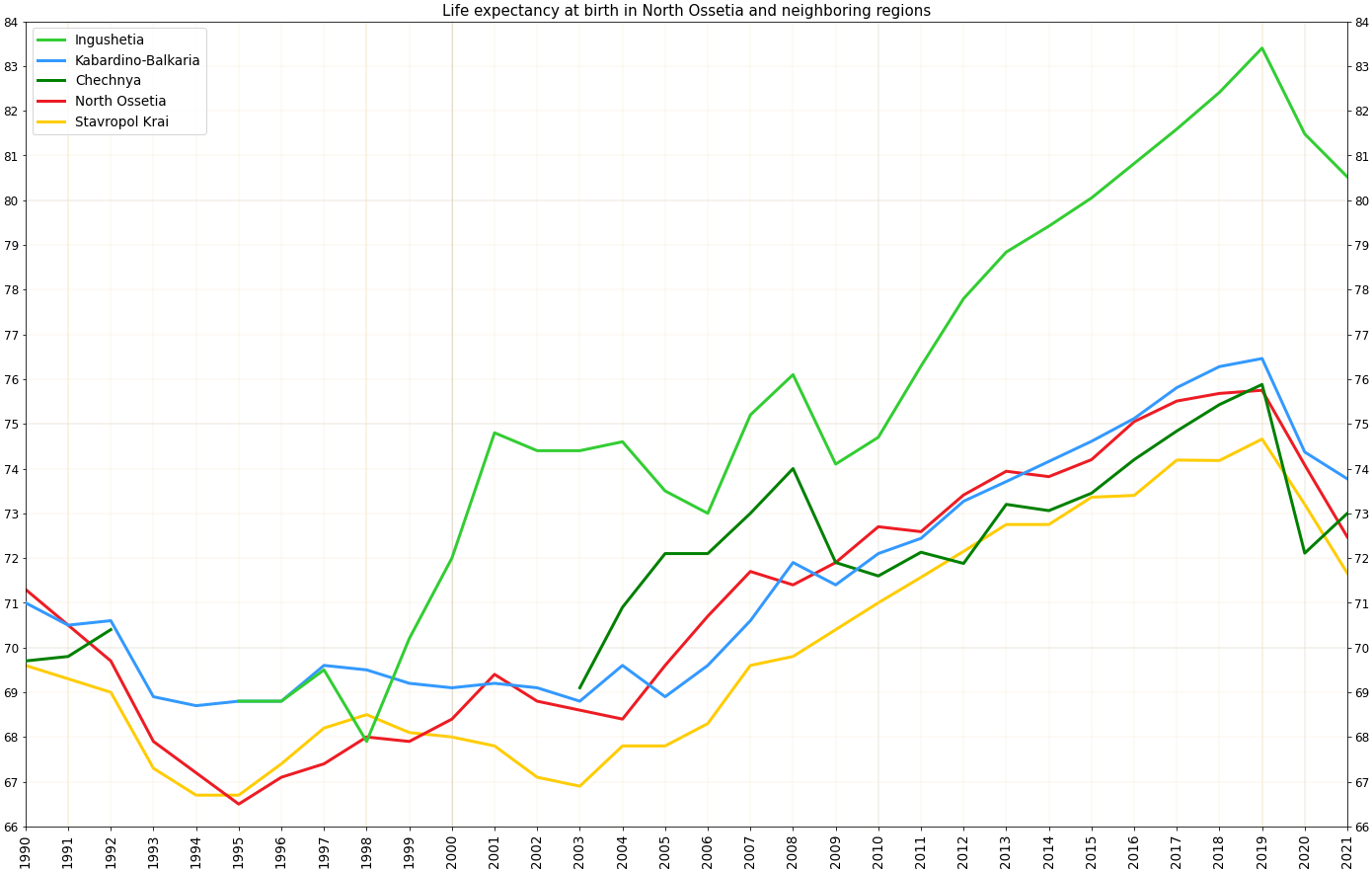
Life expectancy in North Ossetia in comparison with neighboring regions of the country

=== Settlements ===
Largest cities or towns in North Ossetia–Alania 2023 Estimation of Rosstat
Rank		Administrative Division	Pop.
1	Vladikavkaz	City of republic significance of Vladikavkaz	292,886
2	Beslan	Pravoberezhny District	36,011
3	Mozdok	Mozdoksky District	35,662
4	Alagir	Alagirsky District	21,315
5	Ardon	Ardonsky District	18,915
6	Elkhotovo	Kirovsky District	12,690
7	Sunzha	Prigorodny District	11,068
8	Nogir	Prigorodny District	11,947
9	Digora	Digorsky District	9,994
10	Kizlyar	Mozdoksky District	10,970

=== Vital statistics ===
	Average population (per 1000)	Live births	Deaths	Natural change	Crude birth rate (per 1000)	Crude death rate (per 1000)	Natural change (per 1000)	Fertility rates
1970	554	9,731	3,964	5,767	17.6	7.2	10.4	
1975	575	10,368	4,664	5,704	18.0	8.1	9.9	
1980	598	10,135	5,821	4,314	16.9	9.7	7.2	
1985	617	11,598	6,047	5,551	18.8	9.8	9.0	
1990	649	10,967	6,166	4,801	16.9	9.5	7.4	2.23
1991	679	10,985	6,694	4,291	16.2	9.9	6.3	2.09
1992	683	10,048	7,125	2,923	14.7	10.4	4.3	1.89
1993	661	8,251	7,872	379	12.5	11.9	0.6	1.67
1994	666	8,806	8,329	477	13.2	12.5	0.7	1.79
1995	674	8,781	8,574	207	13.0	12.7	0.3	1.78
1996	680	8,043	8,514	−471	11.8	12.5	−0.7	1.62
1997	681	7,758	8,378	−620	11.4	12.3	−0.9	1.56
1998	683	7,767	8,188	−421	11.4	12.0	−0.6	1.56
1999	689	7,195	8,412	−1,217	10.4	12.2	−1.8	1.43
2000	699	7,179	8,626	−1,447	10.3	12.3	−2.0	1.39
2001	707	7,317	8,205	−888	10.3	11.6	−1.3	1.39
2002	709	7,874	8,753	−879	11.1	12.3	−1.2	1.47
2003	709	7,978	8,952	−974	11.3	12.6	−1.4	1.48
2004	707	7,893	8,663	−770	11.2	12.2	−1.1	1.46
2005	706	7,894	8,654	−760	11.2	12.3	−1.1	1.46
2006	706	8,308	8,138	170	11.8	11.5	0.2	1.53
2007	706	9,556	7,806	1,750	13.5	11.1	2.5	1.76
2008	708	9,981	7,975	2,006	14.1	11.3	2.8	1.83
2009	710	10,017	7,987	2,030	14.1	11.3	2.9	1.84
2010	712	10,303	7,748	2,555	14.5	10.8	3.7	1.88
2011	715	10,375	7,720	2,655	14.5	10.8	3.7	1.88
2012	708	10,801	7,525	3,276	15.3	10.6	4.7	1.96
2013	705	10,760	7,394	3,366	15.3	10.5	4.8	1.98
2014	705	10,798	7,554	3,244	15.3	10.7	4.6	2.01
2015	704	10,341	7,558	2,783	14.6	10.7	3.9	1.93
2016	704	9,916	7,296	2,620	14.1	10.3	3.8	1.89
2017	702	8,992	7,151	1,841	12.8	10.2	2.6	1.75
2018		9,120	7,145	1,975	13.0	10.2	2.8	1.83
2019		8,589	7,220	1,369	12.3	10.3	2.0	1.75
2020		8,157	8,361	-204	11.7	12.0	-0.3	1.72
2021		8,091	9,784	-1,693	11.7	14.1	-2.4	1.71
2022		7,470	7,885	-415	10.9	11.5	-0.6	1.59
2023		7,187	6,767	420	10.6	9.9	0.7	1.52
2024		7,237	6,655	582	10.7	9.8	0.9	1.60

=== Ethnic groups ===
The majority of the population of North Ossetia are Christians who belong to the Russian Orthodox Church, although there is also a Muslim minority who are of Ossetian-speaking origin.

According to the 2021 Census, Ossetians make up 68.1% of the republic’s population. Other groups include Russians (18.9%), Ingush (3.8%), Kumyks (2.8%), Armenians (1.8%), Georgians (1.0%), and a host of smaller groups, each accounting for less than 1% of the total population.

Ethnic group	1926 Census^{1}		1939 Census		1959 Census		1970 Census		1979 Census		1989 Census		2002 Census		2010 Census		2021 Census^{2}	
Ethnic group	Number	%	Number	%	Number	%	Number	%	Number	%	Number	%	Number	%	Number	%	Number	%
Ossetians	141,723	49.6%	165,616	50.3%	215,463	47.8%	269,326	48.7%	299,022	50.5%	334,876	53.0%	445,310	62.7%	459,688	65.1%	439,949	68.1%
Russians	68,192	23.8%	122,614	37.2%	178,654	39.6%	202,367	36.6%	200,692	33.9%	189,159	29.9%	164,734	23.2%	147,090	20.8%	122,240	18.9%
Ingush	23,851	8.3%	6,106	1.9%	6,071	1.3%	18,387	3.3%	23,663	4.0%	32,783	5.2%	21,442	3.0%	28,336	4.0%	24,285	3.8%
Kumyks	3,153	1.1%	85	0.0%	3,921	0.9%	6,363	1.2%	7,610	1.3%	9,478	1.5%	12,659	1.8%	16,092	2.3%	18,054	2.8%
Armenians	9,185	3.2%	8,932	2.7%	12,012	2.7%	13,355	2.4%	12,912	2.2%	13,619	2.2%	17,147	2.4%	16,235	2.3%	11,668	1.8%
Georgians	6,057	2.1%	6,312	1.9%	8,160	1.8%	10,323	1.9%	11,347	1.9%	12,284	1.9%	10,803	1.5%	9,095	1.3%	6,756	1.0%
Ukrainians	19,101	6.7%	7,063	2.1%	9,362	2.1%	9,250	1.7%	10,574	1.8%	10,088	1.6%	5,198	0.7%	3,251	0.4%	925	0.1%
Others	14,690	5.1%	12,477	3.8%	16,938	3.8%	23,210	4.2%	26,182	4.4%	30,141	4.8%	32,982	4.6%	26,636	3.8%	22,418	3.5%
^{1} The results of the 1926 census refer to the present territory, which is a combination of the North Ossetian AO, the city of Vladikavkaz and adjacent areas.^{2} 41,062 people were registered from administrative databases, and could not declare an ethnicity. It is estimated that the proportion of ethnicities in this group is the same as that of the declared group.

=== Languages ===
There are two official languages in North Ossetia: Russian, which is official in all Russian territory, and Ossetian. Ossetian is an Indo-European language, belonging to the East Iranian group. Ossetian is the only Iranic language spoken natively in Europe that survives to this day. Russian, acting as a lingua franca in the region, is an East Slavic language and as such also belongs to the Indo-European family, which means the two languages are related, albeit distantly.

=== Religion ===
Religion in North Ossetia–Alania as of 2012 (Sreda Arena Atlas)
Russian Orthodoxy	49.2%
Other Orthodox	2.4%
Protestantism	0.8%
Other Christians	9.8%
Islam	4%
Uatsdin and other native faiths	29.4%
Spiritual but not religious	0.8%
Atheism and irreligion	3%
Other and undeclared	0.6%

According to a 2012 survey which interviewed 56,900 people, 49% of the population of North Ossetia–Alania adheres to the Russian Orthodox Church, 10% declare to be unaffiliated Christian believers, 2% are either Orthodox Christian believers who do not belong to churches or members of non-Russian Orthodox bodies. The second-largest religion is Ossetian ethnic religion, generally called Uatsdin (Уацдин, "True Faith"), a Scythian religion organized into movements such as the Atsata Church, comprising 29% of the population. Muslims constitute 4% of the population, and Protestants the 1%. In addition, 1% of the population declares to be "spiritual but not religious" and 3% to be atheist.

=== Education ===
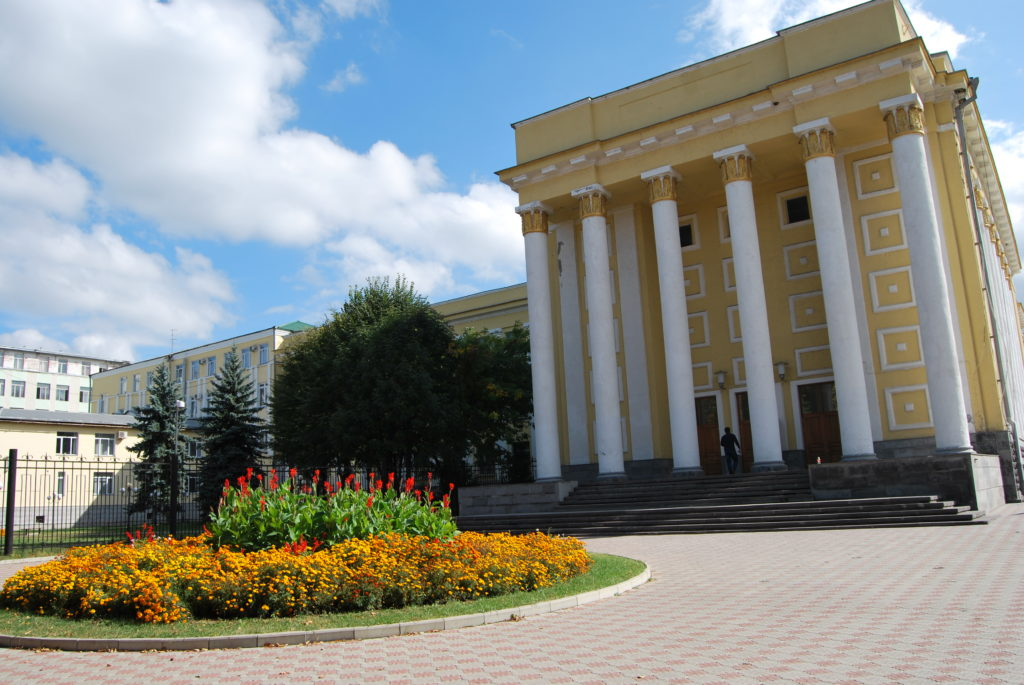
North Ossetia State University

The most important facilities of higher education include North Caucasus State Technological University, North Ossetian State University, North Ossetian State Medical Academy, and Mountain State Agrarian University – all in Vladikavkaz.

== Culture ==
There are six professional theatres in North Ossetia–Alania – including the North Ossetia-Alania Opera and Ballet Theatre, as well as the Ossetian State Philharmonia.

== Gallery ==
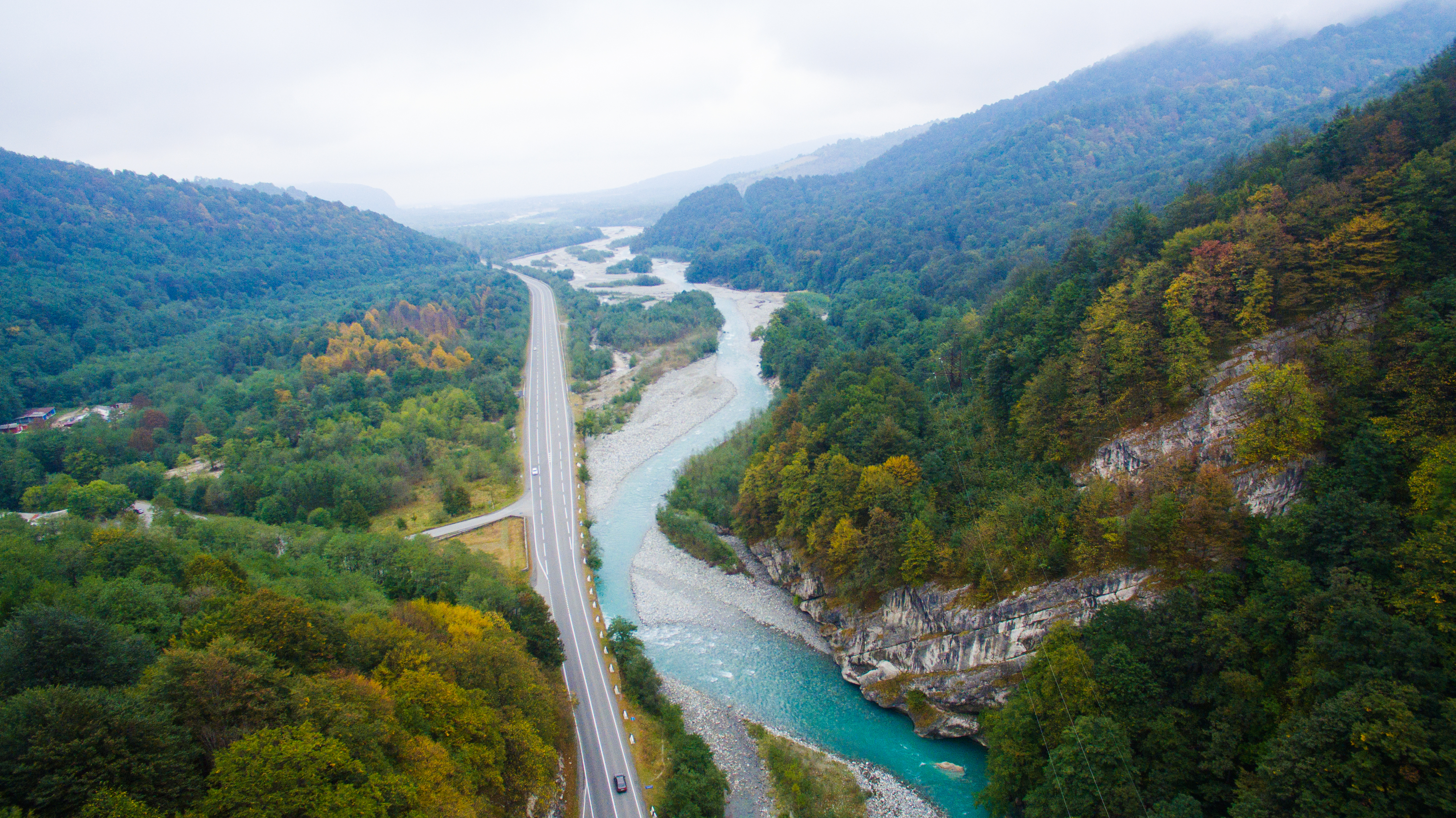
Transcaucasian Highway

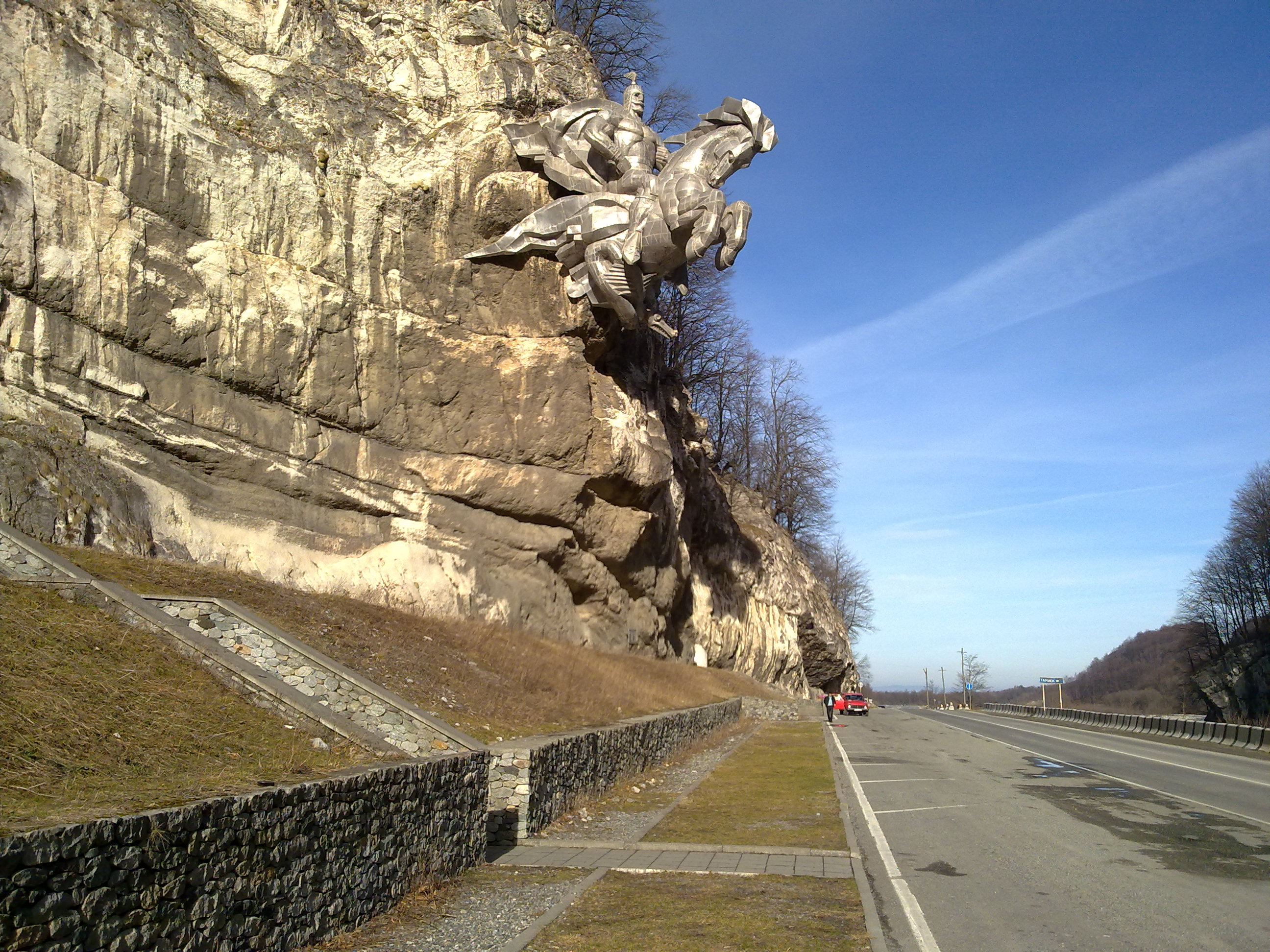
Sculpture in honor of Uastyrdzhi Uastyrdzhi

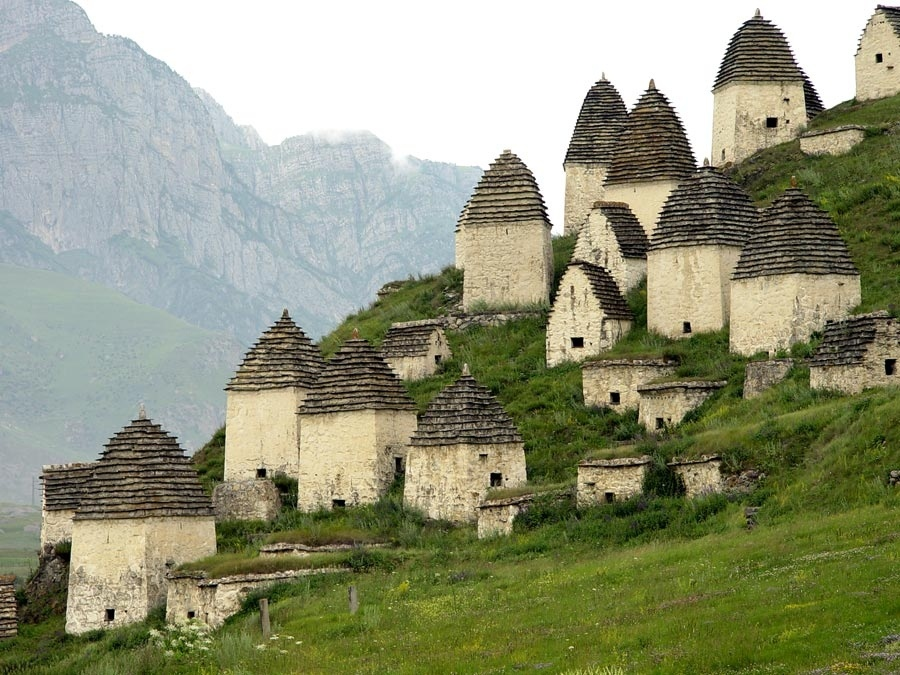
Necropolis near settlement Dargavs

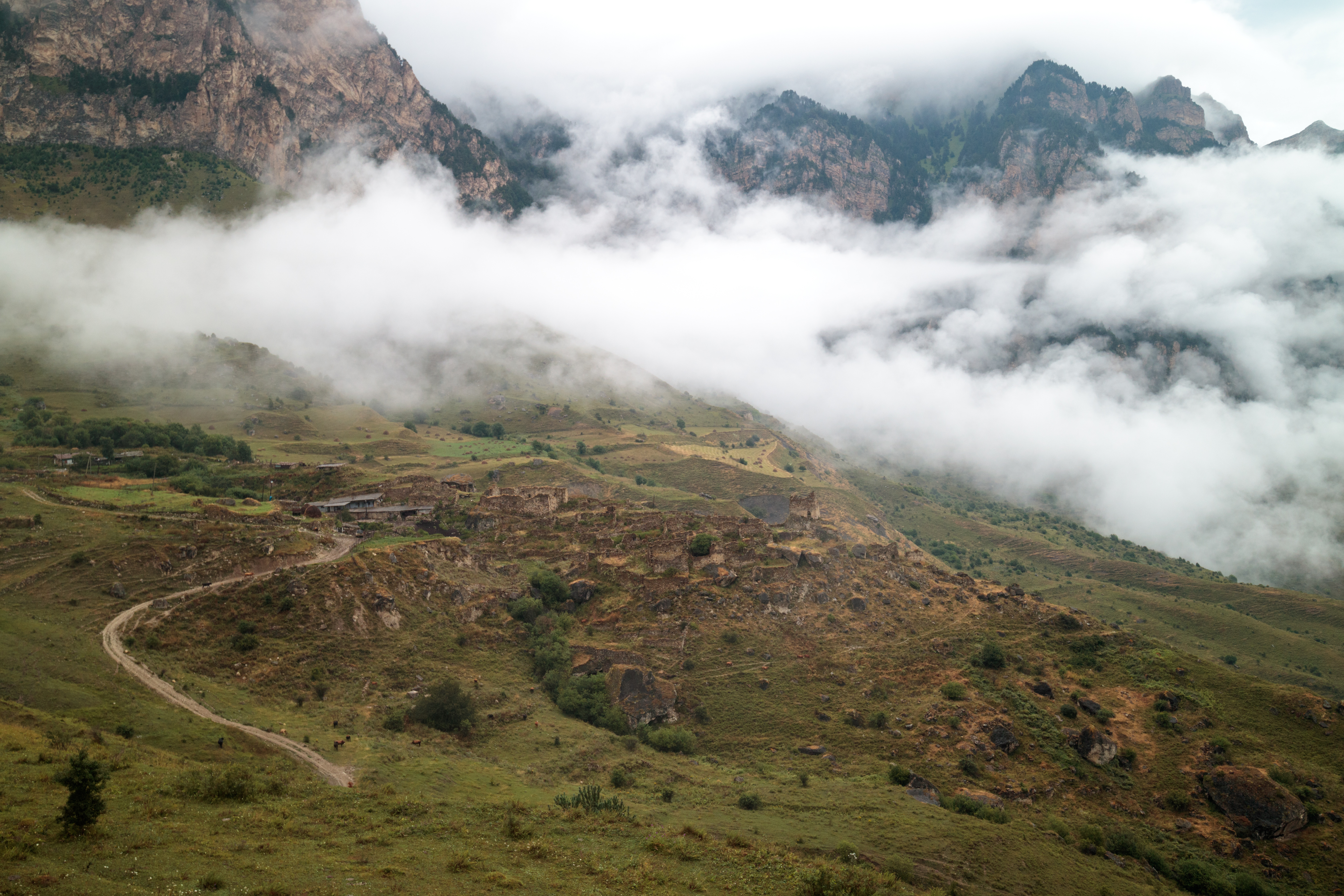
North Ossetian landscape

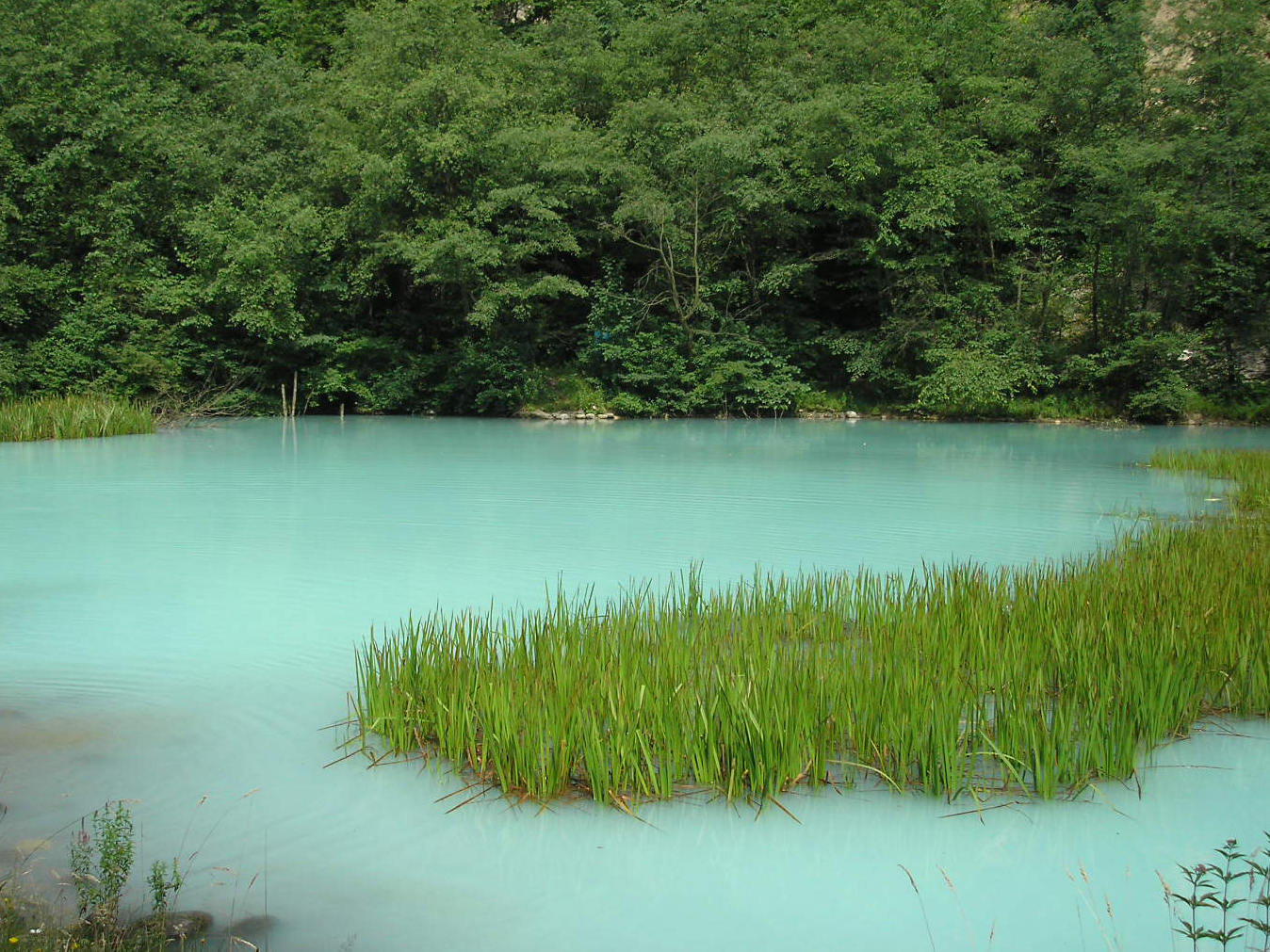
Mineral lake in the gorge of the river Ardon River

== See also ==
- South Ossetia
- Kosta Khetagurov
- Ossetian music
- Styr Nyxas
