= North Ossetia constituency =

Russian legislative constituency

North Ossetia single-member constituency
- Constituency of the Russian State Duma

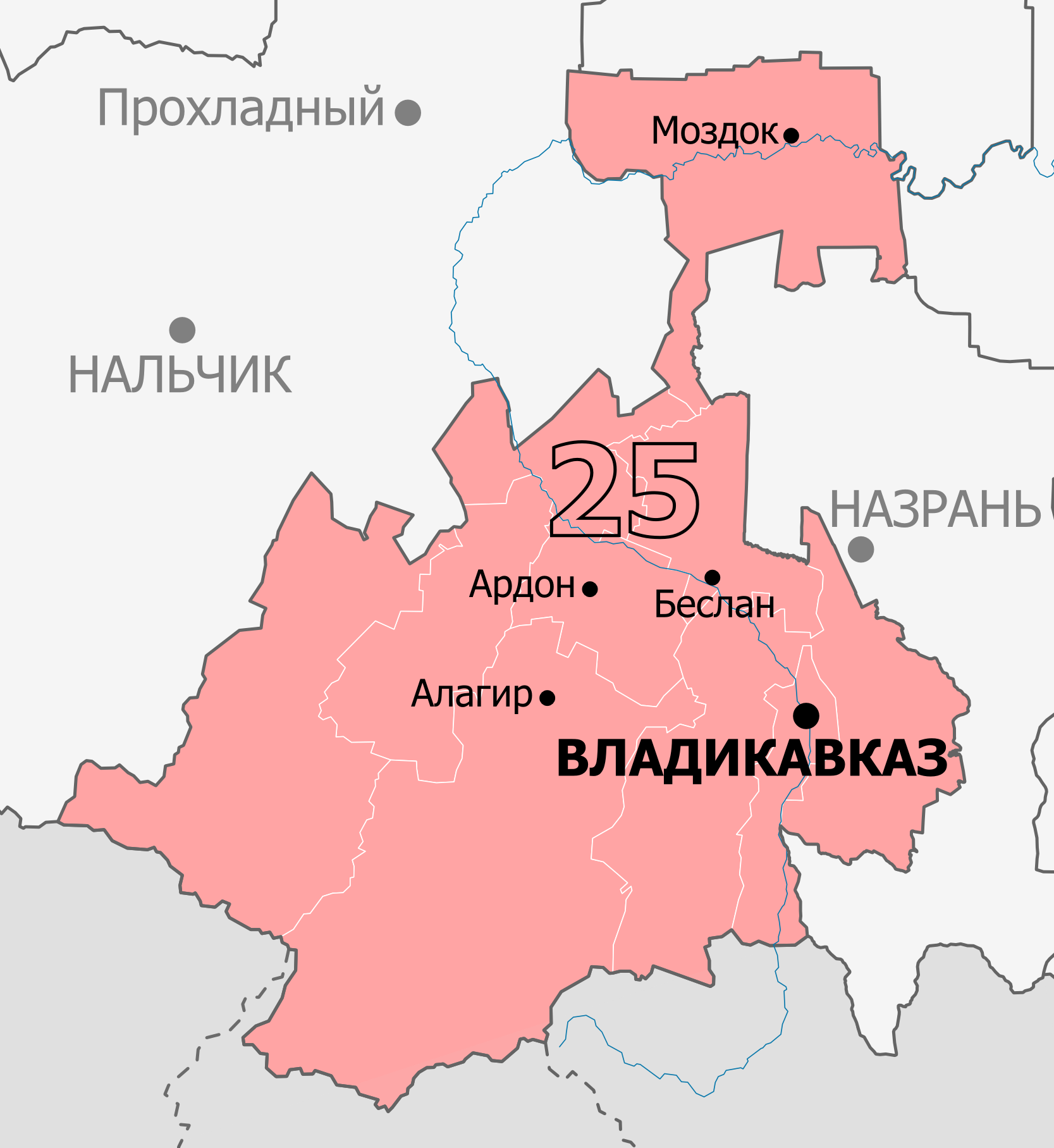
- Deputy: Artur Taymazov; United Russia
- Federal subject: Republic of North Ossetia–Alania
- Districts: Alagirsky, Ardonsky, Digorsky, Irafsky, Kirovsky, Mozdoksky, Pravoberezhny, Prigorodny, Vladikavkaz
- Voters: 513,277 (2026)

The North Ossetia constituency (No.30 (Note: No.22 in 1993-1995 and 2003-2007, No.21 in 1995-2003, No.25 in 2016–2026)) is a Russian legislative constituency in North Ossetia. The constituency encompasses the entire territory of North Ossetia.

The constituency has been represented since 2016 by United Russia deputy Artur Taymazov, the 2004 Olympic Champion wrestler.

== Boundaries ==
1993–2007, 2016–present: Alagirsky District, Ardonsky District, Digorsky District, Irafsky District, Kirovsky District, Mozdoksky District, Pravoberezhny District, Prigorodny District, Vladikavkaz
The constituency has been covering the entirety of North Ossetia since its initial creation in 1993.

== Members elected ==
Election	Member	Party
1993	Aleksandr Dzasokhov (Note: elected President of North Ossetia in January 1998)	Independent
1995	Aleksandr Dzasokhov	Independent
1998	Khazbi Bogov	Independent
1999	Anatoly Chekhoyev	Communist Party
2003	Arsen Fadzayev	Union of Right Forces
2007	Proportional representation - no election by constituency	
2011	Proportional representation - no election by constituency	
2016	Artur Taymazov	United Russia
2021	Artur Taymazov	United Russia
2026	Artur Taymazov	United Russia

== Election results ==
=== 1993 ===
==== Declared candidates ====
- Kazbek Bidzhelov (Independent), lawyer
- Aleksandr Dzasokhov (Independent), former People's Deputy of Russia (1992–1993), former Secretary of the CPSU Central Committee (1990–1991)
- Uruzmag Dzhanayev (Independent), pediatrician
- Beksoltan Dziov (Independent), Deputy Head of the MVD Main Directorate of Criminal Investigations (1987–present), militsiya major general
- Avram Dzotsiyev (Independent), agricultural construction executive
- Vyacheslav Kairov (Independent), philosophy associate professor
- Viktor Karginov (Independent), tax inspector
- Margarita Kulova (Independent), economics lecturer
- Soslan Makiyev (Independent), civil law associate professor
- Antonina Mazina (Independent), Chairwoman of the Lukovskaya Rural Executive Committee
- Nikolay Solovyov (Independent), Member of Supreme Council of North Ossetia (1990–present), kolkhoz chairman
- Valery Tedeyev (Independent), engineering executive
- Aleksandr Tsaliyev (Independent), Member of Constitutional Supervision Committee of North Ossetia (1990–present)
- Konstantin Yenaldiyev (Independent), metal recycling executive

==== Results ====
Summary of the 12 December 1993 Russian legislative election in the North Ossetia constituency
Candidate	Party	Votes	%
Aleksandr Dzasokhov	Independent	143,574	55.96%
Beksoltan Dziov	Independent	24,378	9.50%
Nikolay Solovyov	Independent	20,538	8.00%
Aleksandr Tsaliyev	Independent	15,757	6.14%
Konstantin Yenaldiyev	Independent	10,354	4.04%
Uruzmag Dzhanayev	Independent	3,445	1.34%
Kazbek Bidzhelov	Independent	3,239	1.26%
Antonina Mazina	Independent	3,193	1.24%
Viktor Karginov	Independent	2,857	1.11%
Avram Dzotsiyev	Independent	2,615	1.02%
Valery Tedeyev	Independent	1,754	0.68%
Margarita Kulova	Independent	1,671	0.65%
Soslan Makiyev	Independent	1,337	0.52%
against all		7,083	2.76%
Total		256,580	100%

=== 1995 ===
==== Declared candidates ====
- Vera Aliyeva (Independent), programmer
- Aleksandr Dzasokhov (Independent), incumbent Member of State Duma (1994–present)
- Avram Dzotsiyev (CPRF), agricultural construction executive, 1993 candidate for this seat
- Ruslan Gioyev (Independent), Member of Parliament of North Ossetia–Alania (1995–present), distillery director
- Viktor Ivanov (LDPR), Member of State Duma (1994–present)
- Margarita Kulova (Independent), Secretary of the Presidential Council of North Ossetia, 1993 candidate for this seat
- Valery Tsibirov (PGL), businessman

==== Results ====
Summary of the 17 December 1995 Russian legislative election in the North Ossetia constituency
Candidate	Party	Votes	%
Aleksandr Dzasokhov (incumbent)	Independent	139,445	52.62%
Ruslan Gioyev	Independent	46,144	17.41%
Avram Dzotsiyev	Communist Party	36,479	13.77%
Viktor Ivanov	Liberal Democratic Party	17,200	6.49%
Margarita Kulova	Independent	2,936	1.11%
Vera Aliyeva	Independent	2,555	0.96%
Valery Tsibirov	Pamfilova–Gurov–Lysenko	2,283	0.86%
against all		10,553	3.98%
Total		265,003	100%

=== 1998 ===
==== Declared candidates ====
- Khasan Albegonov (Independent), Member of Parliament of North Ossetia–Alania (1995–present), road construction executive
- Khazbi Bogov (Independent), Deputy Premier of North Ossetia – Head of the Free Economic Zone (1997–present)
- Tamerlan Tsomayev (Independent), tekhnikum deputy principal

==== Results ====
Summary of the 21 June 1998 by-election in the North Ossetia constituency
Candidate	Party	Votes	%
Khazbi Bogov	Independent	58,171	39.40%
Khasan Albegonov	Independent	37,460	25.37%
Tamerlan Tsomayev	Independent	27,461	18.60%
against all		3,541	3.23%
Total		-	100%

=== 1999 ===
==== Declared candidates ====
- Khazbi Bogov (Independent), incumbent Member of State Duma (1998–present)
- Anatoly Chekhoyev (CPRF), Member of State Duma (1994–present)
- Oleg Datiyev (NDR), Parliament of North Ossetia–Alania staffer
- Viktor Dedegkayev (OVR), Member of Parliament of North Ossetia–Alania (1995–present), Chairman of the National Bank of North Ossetia (1993–present)
- Ruslan Dzalayev (LDPR), nonprofit director
- Badri Gazzati (Independent), college director
- Ruslan Gioyev (Independent), Member of Parliament of North Ossetia–Alania (1995–present), cold storage plant director, 1995 candidate for this seat
- Arkady Kadokhov (Independent), former Member of Parliament of North Ossetia–Alania (1995–1999), businessman, 1998 presidential candidate
- Uruzmag Karkusov (Independent), construction businessman
- Georgy Katayev (Independent), unemployed
- Kazbek Khetagurov (Independent), Chairman of the North Ossetia Committee on Forestry
- Ruslan Khugayev (Independent), businessman
- Artur Kochiyev (RSP), pharmaceutical businessman
- Inal Ostayev (Independent), transportation inspector, retired Russian Air Force officer
- Valery Revazov (Independent), postgraduate student
- Amirkhan Torchinov (Independent), Moscow State University of Medicine and Dentistry department of obstetrics and gynecology head

==== Did not file ====
- Aleksandr Borisov (Independent)
- Yermak Khadonov (Independent)
- Leonid Khugayev (Independent)
- Andrey Kolodin (Independent)
- Vladimir Lagkuyev (Independent), former Member of Supreme Council of North Ossetia (1990–1995), tourism businessman

==== Results ====
Summary of the 19 December 1999 Russian legislative election in the North Ossetia constituency
Candidate	Party	Votes	%
Anatoly Chekhoyev	Communist Party	52,631	22.93%
Khazbi Bogov (incumbent)	Independent	48,775	21.25%
Viktor Dedegkayev	Fatherland – All Russia	36,408	15.86%
Arkady Kadokhov	Independent	33,146	14.44%
Kazbek Khetagurov	Independent	11,296	4.92%
Amirkhan Torchinov	Independent	8,369	3.65%
Valery Revazov	Independent	5,656	2.46%
Ruslan Gioyev	Independent	2,722	2.19%
Ruslan Dzalayev	Liberal Democratic Party	2,610	1.14%
Georgy Katayev	Independent	1,649	0.72%
Artur Kochiyev	Russian Socialist Party	1,489	0.65%
Ruslan Khugayev	Independent	1,431	0.62%
Oleg Datiyev	Our Home – Russia	1,392	0.61%
Badri Gazzati	Independent	953	0.42%
Inal Ostayev	Independent	773	0.34%
Uruzmag Karkusov	Independent	662	0.29%
against all		15,194	6.62%
Total		229,578	100%

=== 2003 ===
==== Declared candidates ====
- Soslan Andiyev (United Russia), Chairman of the North Ossetia Committee on Physical Culture and Sport (1989–present), 1976 and 1980 Olympic Champion wrestler
- Anatoly Chekhoyev (Rodina), incumbent Member of State Duma (1994–present), 2002 presidential candidate
- Viktor Dedegkayev (PVR-RPZh), Member of Parliament of North Ossetia–Alania (1995–present), 1999 OVR candidate for this seat
- Marat Dzhioyev (Independent), unemployed
- Arsen Fadzayev (SPS), Member of Parliament of North Ossetia–Alania (1999–present), 1988 and 1992 Olympic Champion wrestler
- Slavik Ikoyev (LDPR), entrepreneur
- Elbrus Kallagaty (RPP-PSS), construction executive
- Uruzmag Ogoyev (Independent), former Commander of the 11th Air and Air Defence Forces Army (1998–2000), retired PVO lieutenant general

==== Withdrawn candidates ====
- Vyacheslav Kairov (NPRF), North Caucasian State Technological University department of philosophy and political science head, 1993 candidate for this seat
- Soslan Sozanov (SDPR), pensioner

==== Failed to qualify ====
- Anatoly Kolkhidov (Independent), construction foreman

==== Did not file ====
- Georgy Abayev (Independent), undergraduate student
- Aslan Gutiyev (Independent), economist

==== Results ====
Summary of the 7 December 2003 Russian legislative election in the North Ossetia constituency
Candidate	Party	Votes	%
Arsen Fadzayev	Union of Right Forces	94,414	42.78%
Uruzmag Ogoyev	Independent	66,886	30.31%
Soslan Andiyev	United Russia	16,125	7.31%
Anatoly Chekhoyev (incumbent)	Rodina	11,405	5.17%
Vladimir Dzakhov	Independent	6,564	2.97%
Viktor Dedegkayev	Party of Russia's Rebirth-Russian Party of Life	2,414	1.09%
Marat Dzhioyev	Independent	1,910	0.87%
Slavik Ikayev	Liberal Democratic Party	1,833	0.83%
Elbrus Kallagaty	Russian Pensioners' Party-Party of Social Justice	1,539	0.70%
against all		12,219	5.54%
Total		221,283	100%

=== 2016 ===
==== Declared candidates ====
- Soslan Bestayev (LDPR), coordinator of the party regional office
- Ruslan Gioyev (Party of Growth), former Member of Parliament of North Ossetia–Alania (1995–2003), road executive, 1995 and 1999 candidate for this seat
- Aleksey Khatagov (Yabloko), attorney
- Fatima Khatsayeva (The Greens), landscaping associate professor
- Gary Kuchiyev (A Just Russia), Deputy Chairman of the Parliament of North Ossetia–Alania (2012–present), Member of the Parliament (2004–present)
- Nugzar Musulbes (CPCR), perennial candidate
- Vladimir Pisarenko (Rodina), Deputy Minister of North Ossetia for National Relations
- Artur Taymazov (United Russia), 2004 Olympic Champion wrestler

==== Withdrawn candidates ====
- Arsen Fadzayev (Patriots of Russia), Member of Parliament of North Ossetia–Alania (2012–present), former Member of State Duma (2003–2011)
- Robert Kochiev (CPRF), Member of State Duma (2011–present)

==== Failed to qualify ====
- Murat Aguzarov (Independent), Head of Rosreestr Regional Office (2004–present), brother of former Head of North Ossetia–Alania Tamerlan Aguzarov
- Marat Dzhioyev (Independent), unemployed, 2003 candidate for this seat
- Anatoly Kolkhidov (Independent), construction foreman, 2003 candidate for this seat

==== Declined ====
- Zurab Makiev (United Russia), Member of State Duma (2014–present) (won the primary, ran on the party list)
- Vyacheclav Pagiyev (United Russia), Member of Parliament of North Ossetia–Alania (2016–present), pharmaceutical executive (lost the primary)

==== Results ====
Summary of the 18 September 2016 Russian legislative election in the North Ossetia constituency
Candidate	Party	Votes	%
Artur Taymazov	United Russia	374,194	82.71%
Gary Kuchiyev	A Just Russia	31,007	6.85%
Vladimir Pisarenko	Rodina	10,221	2.26%
Soslan Bestayev	Liberal Democratic Party	9,560	2.11%
Nugzar Musulbes	Communists of Russia	9,179	2.03%
Ruslan Gioyev	Party of Growth	4,954	1.09%
Fatima Khatsayeva	The Greens	4,804	1.06%
Aleksey Khatagov	Yabloko	4,652	1.03%
Total		452,421	100%

=== 2021 ===
==== Declared candidates ====
- Soslan Bestayev (LDPR), Deputy Chairman of the Vladikavkaz Assembly of Representatives (2019–present), 2016 candidate for this seat
- Tamerlan Bigayev (The Greens), businessman
- Soslan Didarov (SR–ZP), Member of Vladikavkaz Assembly of Representatives (2019–present), aide to Senator Arsen Fadzayev
- Alan Makayev (CPRF), aide to State Duma member Kazbek Taysaev
- Nugzar Musulbes (CPCR), perennial candidate, 2016 candidate for this seat
- Artur Taymazov (United Russia), incumbent Member of State Duma (2016–present)
- Kazbek Zoloyev (Rodina), weightlifting coach

==== Failed to qualify ====
- Marat Dzhioyev (Independent), unemployed, 2003 and 2016 candidate for this seat
- Aleksey Msoyev (Independent), former Member of Parliament of North Ossetia–Alania (2007–2012)

==== Results ====
Summary of the 17-19 September 2021 Russian legislative election in the North Ossetia constituency
Candidate	Party	Votes	%
Artur Taymazov (incumbent)	United Russia	340,844	76.01%
Soslan Bestayev	Liberal Democratic Party	24,725	5.51%
Soslan Didarov	A Just Russia — For Truth	23,915	5.33%
Alan Makayev	Communist Party	17,733	3.95%
Kazbek Zoloyev	Rodina	14,396	3.21%
Nugzar Musulbes	Communists of Russia	11,039	2.46%
Tamerlan Bigayev	The Greens	7,692	1.72%
Total		267,967	100%

=== 2026 ===
==== Declared candidates ====
- Soslan Bestayev (LDPR), Member of Vladikavkaz Assembly of Representatives (2019–present), 2016 and 2021 candidate for this seat
- Chermen Dudati (CPRF), Member of Parliament of North Ossetia–Alania (2022–present), director of the North-Ossetian State Academic Theatre (2020–present)
- Taymuraz Fidarov (Rodina), Member of Prigorodny District Assembly of Representatives (2021–present), former Deputy Chief of Staff to the Head of the Republic of North Ossetia–Alania (2017–2021)
- Yakov Khubulov (CPCR), businessman
- Alan Kuchiyev (PPD), oil businessman
- Alan Mamukayev (The Greens), entrepreneur
- Artur Taymazov (United Russia), incumbent Member of State Duma (2016–present)
- Zemfira Tskayeva (A Just Russia), Member of Vladikavkaz Assembly of Representatives (2024–present), community activist

==== Results ====
Summary of the 18-20 September 2026 Russian legislative election in the North Ossetia constituency
Candidate	Party	Votes	%
Artur Taymazov (incumbent)	United Russia	337,248	76.95%
Soslan Bestayev	Liberal Democratic Party	26,095	5.95%
Alan Kuchiyev	Party of Direct Democracy	22,152	5.05%
Zemfira Tskayeva	A Just Russia	16,273	3.71%
Chermen Dudati	Communist Party	12,641	2.88%
Taymuraz Fidarov	Rodina	9,530	2.17%
Yakov Khubulov	Communists of Russia	6,294	1.44%
Alan Mamukayev	The Greens	4,781	1.09%
Total		438,243	100%
