= 2026 North Ossetian head election =

Regional legislative election in Russia

- 20 September 2026
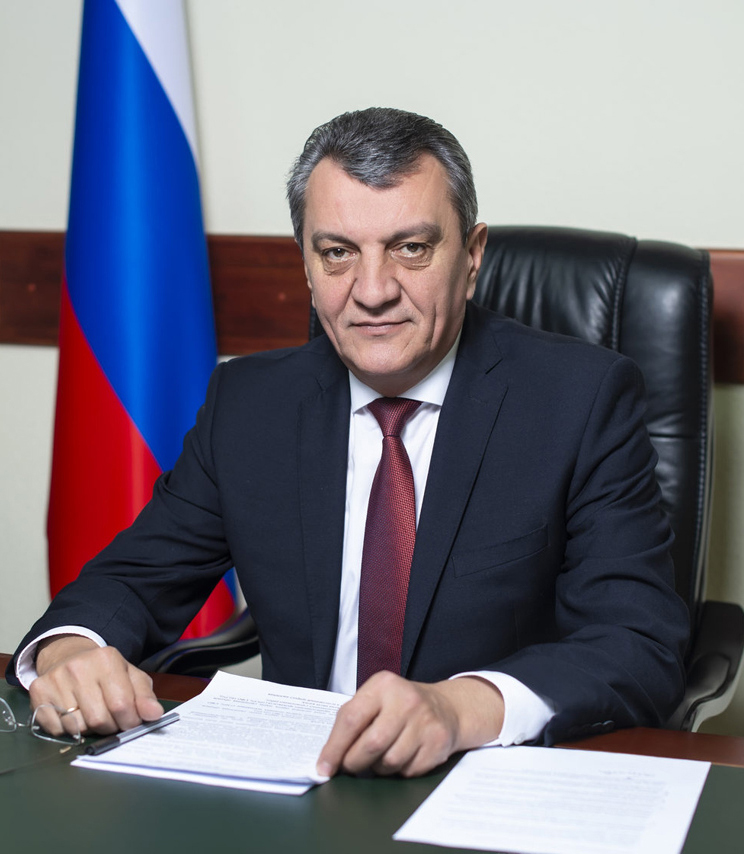
		SR
Candidate	Sergey Menyaylo	Oleg Varnavin
Party	United Russia	A Just Russia
Electoral vote	61	5
Percentage	92.42%	7.58%
Head before election
Sergey Menyaylo
United Russia
Head-elect
Sergey Menyaylo
United Russia
Senator before election
Taymuraz Mamsurov
United Russia
Senator after election
Taymuraz Mamsurov
United Russia

The 2026 Republic of North Ossetia–Alania head election took place on 20 September 2026, on common election day, to elect the Head of the Republic of North Ossetia–Alania. Incumbent Head Sergey Menyaylo was re-elected for a second term in office. Head of North Ossetia–Alania is elected by the Parliament of the Republic of North Ossetia–Alania.

== Background ==
Then-Head of the Republic of North Ossetia–Alania Vyacheslav Bitarov announced his resignation in April 2021. President of Russia Vladimir Putin accepted Bitarov's resignation and appointed Presidential Envoy to the Siberian Federal District and former Governor of Sevastopol Sergey Menyaylo, an ethnic Ossetian, acting Head of North Ossetia–Alania. Bitarov's resignation was expected due to poor economic situation, elite disarray and lack of necessary management skills which was evident during 2020 anti-lockdown rallies in the region. In September 2021 Menyaylo was elected for a full term by the Parliament of the Republic of North Ossetia–Alania with 57 votes in favour out of 68.

Menyaylo's term as Head of North Ossetia–Alania was marked with tackling some social problems and mild economic development. However, Menyaylo could not reach an elite consensus and was unable to manages clashes between local elite.

== Candidates ==
Head of the Republic of North Ossetia–Alania is elected indirectly, by the Parliament of the Republic of North Ossetia–Alania, for the term of five years. Candidate for Head of North Ossetia–Alania should be a Russian citizen and at least 30 years old. Candidates for Head of North Ossetia–Alania should not have a foreign citizenship or residence permit. Candidates for Head of North Ossetia–Alania are nominated by political parties, which have factions either in the Parliament of North Ossetia–Alania or in the State Duma, and the parties can nominate up to three candidates each. President of Russia then selects three nominated candidates and submits them to the Parliament of North Ossetia–Alania. The Parliament elects Head of North Ossetia–Alania with a simple majority. Also head candidates present 3 candidacies to the Federation Council and election winner later appoints one of the presented candidates.

The following parties are eligible to nominate a candidate for Head of North Ossetia–Alania:

- United Russia
- Communist Party of the Russian Federation
- Liberal Democratic Party of Russia
- A Just Russia
- New People

=== Declared ===
Candidate name, political party	Occupation	Status	Ref.
Chermen Dudati; Communist Party	Member of Parliament of the Republic of North Ossetia–Alania (2022–present) director of the North-Ossetian State Academic Theatre (2020–present)	Submitted by the President	
Sergey Menyaylo; United Russia	Incumbent Head of the Republic of North Ossetia–Alania (2021–present)	Submitted by the President	
Oleg Varnavin; A Just Russia	Former Member of Mozdoksky District Assembly of Representatives (2017–2022); Coal executive	Submitted by the President	

== Results ==
Summary of the 20 September 2026 North Ossetian head election results
Candidate	Party	Votes	%
Sergey Menyaylo (incumbent)	United Russia	61	92.42
Oleg Varnavin	A Just Russia	5	7.58
Chermen Dudati	Communist Party	0	0.00
Valid votes		66	100.00
Blank ballots		0	0.00
Total		66	100.00
Turnout		66	94.29
Registered voters		70	100.00

Head Menyaylo re-appointed incumbent Senator Taymuraz Mamsurov (United Russia) to the Federation Council.

== See also ==
- 2026 Russian regional elections
