= Head of the Republic of North Ossetia–Alania =

Highest-ranking official in North Ossetia–Alania, Russia

- Республикӕ Цӕгат Ирыстоны — Алани сӕргълӕууӕг (Iron Ossetic); Глава Республики Северная Осетия — Алания (Russian)
- Standard of the head of the republic

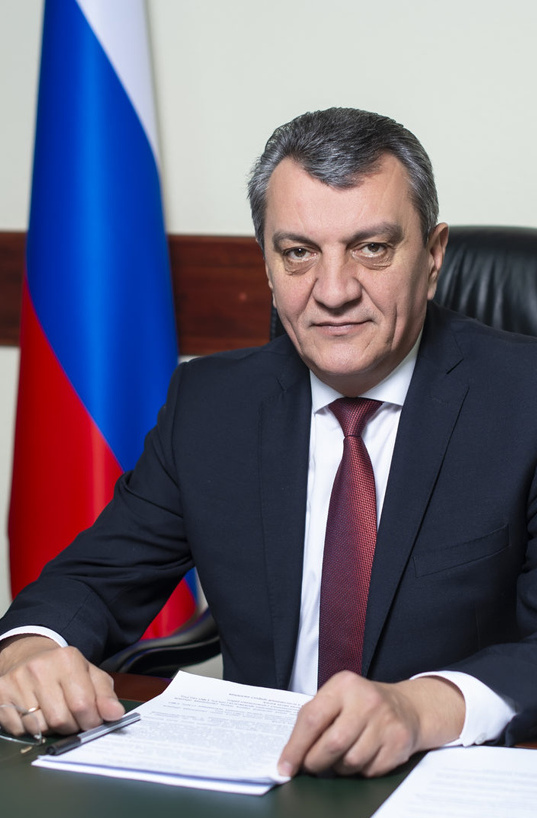
- Incumbent; Sergey Menyaylo since 9 April 2021
- Executive branch of the Republic of North Ossetia–Alania
- Style: His Excellency; The Honorable
- Type: Governor; Head of state; Head of government
- Residence: Vladikavkaz
- Nominator: Political parties
- Appointer: Indirect elections
- Term length: 5 years
- Constituting instrument: Constitution of North Ossetia–Alania, Section 5
- Formation: 21 January 1994
- First holder: Akhsarbek Galazov
- Website: Official website

The position of the head of the Republic of North Ossetia–Alania (Note: Russian: Глава Республики Северная Осетия — Алания, romanized: Glava Respubliki Severnaya Osetiya — Alaniya; Iron Ossetic: Республикӕ Цӕгат Ирыстоны — Алани сӕргълӕууӕг, romanized: Rêšpublika Tsagât Ireštone — Âlâni Sarhlawwag) (formerly known as the President of the Republic of North Ossetia–Alania) is the highest office within the Government of North Ossetia–Alania in Russia. The head is elected indirectly by vote in parliament. The term of service is five years.

== List ==
No.	Portrait	Name (born–died)	Term of office			Political party	Elected	Ref.
No.	Portrait	Name (born–died)	Took office	Left office	Time in office	Political party	Elected	Ref.
1		Akhsarbek Galazov (1929–2013)	21 January 1994	30 January 1998	4 years, 9 days	Independent	1994	
2		Alexander Dzasokhov (born 1934)	30 January 1998	7 June 2005	7 years, 158 days	Independent	1998; 2002	
3		Taymuraz Mamsurov (born 1954)	7 June 2005	5 June 2015	9 years, 333 days	United Russia	2005 (Note: Appointed by federal president.); 2010	
–		Tamerlan Aguzarov (1963–2016)	5 June 2015	13 September 2015	259 days	United Russia	– (Note: Acting head of the republic.)	
4		Tamerlan Aguzarov (1963–2016)	13 September 2015	19 February 2016 (Note: Died in office.)	259 days	United Russia	2015 (Note: Indirect election.)	
–		Vyacheslav Bitarov (born 1961)	19 February 2016	18 September 2016	5 years, 49 days	United Russia	–	
5		Vyacheslav Bitarov (born 1961)	18 September 2016	9 April 2021	5 years, 49 days	United Russia	2016	
–		Sergey Menyaylo (born 1960)	9 April 2021	19 September 2021	5 years, 220 days	Independent	–	
6		Sergey Menyaylo (born 1960)	19 September 2021	Incumbent	5 years, 220 days	United Russia	2021; 2026	
