= List of chairmen of the Parliament of North Ossetia–Alania =

List of chairmen of the Parliament of North Ossetia–Alania.

This is a list of chairmen (speakers) of the Supreme Council:

Name	Period
Akhsarbek Galazov	March 21, 1990 – January 21, 1994

This is a list of chairmen (speakers) of the Parliament of the Republic of North Ossetia–Alania:

Name	Period
Vyacheslav Parinov	1995–2000
Taymuraz Mamsurov	October 19, 2000 – June 7, 2005
Larisa Khabitsova	June 30, 2005 – October 14, 2012
Alexei Machnev	Since October 20, 2012
