= Tree of Sorrow (monument) =

Monument in Beslan, Russia

Tree of Sadness
- Древо скорби
- Interactive map of Tree of Sadness
- Location: Beslan, Russia
- Coordinates: 43°11′28″N 44°33′58″E
- Designer: Alan Kornaev, Zaurbek Dzanagov
- Material: Bronze
- Height: 9 meters
- Opening date: August 2005
- Dedicated to: Victims of the Beslan school siege (2004)

Tree of Sorrow (Russian: Древо скорби) is a monument dedicated to the victims of the terrorist attack that took place on September 1–3, 2004, at School No. 1 in Beslan (North Ossetia–Alania). As a result of the school's seizure by terrorists, 333 people were killed, including 186 children. The monument was erected in August 2005 at the city's memorial cemetery.

The bronze composition depicts the trunk of a tree formed by four female figures. The crown of the tree is made up of the women's outstretched arms, which hold angels symbolizing the children who perished. The monument rises to about 9 meters in height. It was created by sculptors Alan Kornaev and Zaurbek Dzanagov.

== Opening ==
The unveiling ceremony was attended by the relatives and families of the victims, survivors, residents of the city and other districts of North Ossetia, Head of the Republic Taimuraz Mamsurov, members of parliament, representatives of republican ministries and agencies, as well as the President of South Ossetia, Eduard Kokoity.

Following the toll of the bell, a peal of mourning chimes sounded, and then the ticking of a metronome was heard. The names of all those who died in the school were read aloud in alphabetical order. After the monument was unveiled, white doves were released and perched on the bronze tree. People who came to the cemetery laid wreaths and flowers at the monument. Bishop Feofan (Ashurkov) of Stavropol and Vladikavkaz held a memorial service at the site.

The authors of the composition were nominated for a gold medal of the Russian Academy of Arts. For the creation of the monument, Alan Kornaev won the Grand Prix of the Kuban professional visual arts competition "Biennale–2005". In 2006, the authors of the monument received an FSB Award in the "Visual Arts" category.

== Memorial ceremonies ==
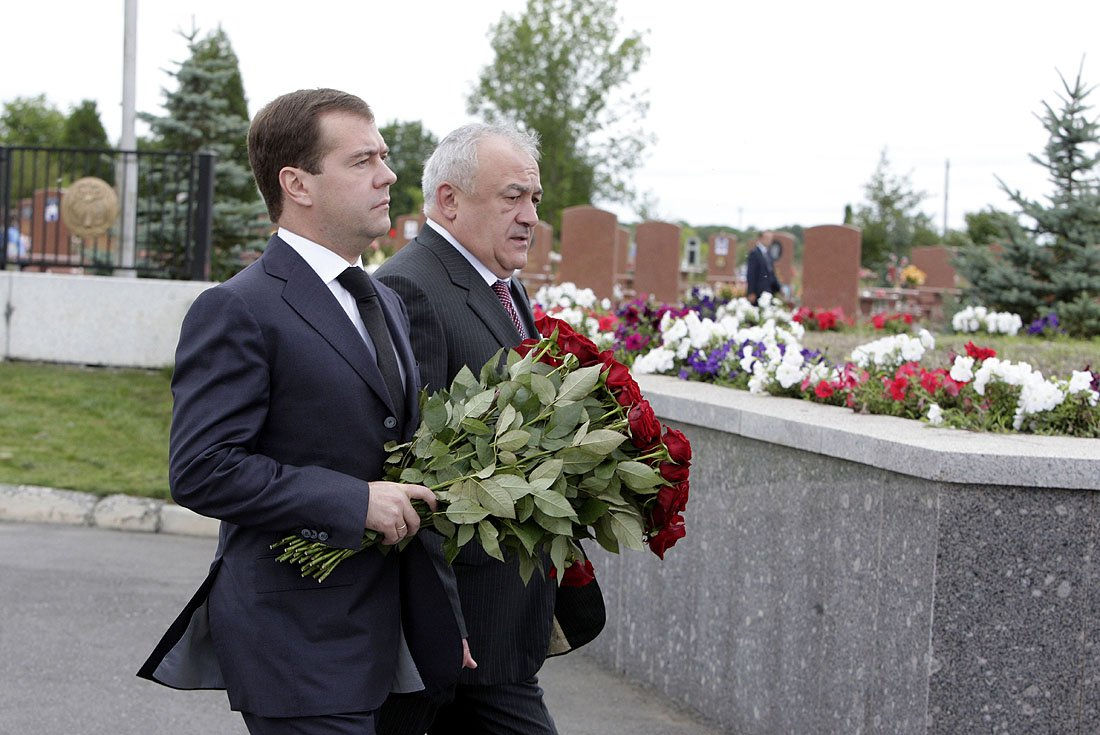
Russian President Dmitry Medvedev and Head of the Republic of North Ossetia Taimuraz Mamsurov lay flowers at the monument. August 8, 2009.

Commemorative ceremonies are held at the monument on the anniversary of the terrorist attack. High-ranking officials of the country sometimes take part in the ceremony; for instance, in August 2009, Russian President Dmitry Medvedev honored the memory of the victims by laying flowers at the monument.
