= State Anthem of North Ossetia–Alania =

Subdivisional anthem of Russia

Cægat Irystony paddzaxadon gimn
English: State Anthem of North Ossetia
- Цӕгат Ирыстоны паддзахадон гимн
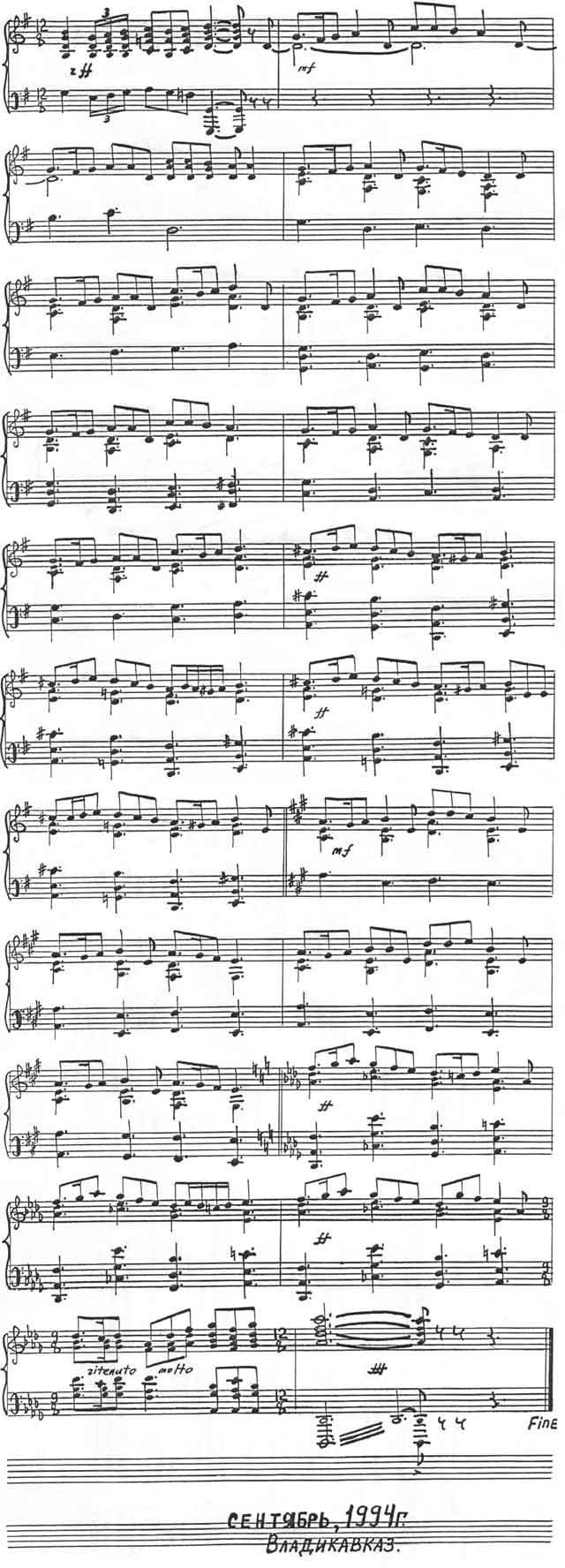
- Regional anthem of North Ossetia–Alania (Russia)
- Also known as: Государственный гимн Республики Северной Осетии — Алании (Russian) (English: 'State Anthem of the Republic of North Ossetia–Alania')
- Lyrics: Kamal Khodov (Ossetian version); Irina Gurzhibekova (Russian version)
- Music: Arkady Tsorionov, Atsamaz Makoev
- Adopted: 24 November 1994

Audio sample
- Digital instrumental version: file; help

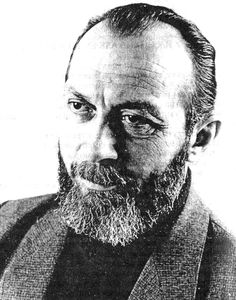
Kamal Khodov, author of the Ossetic lyrics

The State Anthem of the Republic of North Ossetia–Alania (Note: Iron Ossetic: Цӕгат Ирыстоны паддзахадон гимн, pronounced [t͡sɐˈgat ˈirɘs̠tonɘ ˈpadːzaxadon gʲimn]; Russian: Государственный гимн Республики Северной Осетии — Алании) was adopted by the Parliament of the Republic of North Ossetia–Alania on 24 November 1994. The lyrics were written by Kamal Khodov.

== Lyrics ==
Ossetian original

Cyrillic script

Зӕрин хур йӕ тынтӕ нывӕнды фӕлмӕн (Note: тынтӕ is sometimes omitted.)
Нӕ фыдӕлты рагон уӕзӕгыл рӕдауӕй
Арвы бын калы, фӕрдыгау, тӕмӕн’
Ирыстон йӕ адӕмты фарнӕй.

Заманты тарӕй ӕрттивы, зынгау,
Дӕ уидаг — нӕ Ивгъуыд, нӕ Абон, нӕ Фидӕн…
Барвӕсс нӕ куывдыл, Хуыцӕутты Хуыцау!
Уастырджи, рафӕлгӕс, табу — Дӕхицӕн!

Базард:
Кад ӕмӕ радимӕ фидӕнмӕ кӕс!
Амондӕй абузӕд, ронгау, дӕ цард!
Амонд, мысайнагау, фидӕнма хӕсс!
Дӕ кӕстӕр дын басгуыхӕд кард ӕмӕ уарт!

Фӕлтӕрӕй-фӕлтӕрмӕ фӕцӕуӕд дӕ фарн!
Рын ӕмӕ сонӕй дӕ хизӕд хъысмӕт!
Хистӕры намыс, кӕстӕры ӕхсар
Хурау дын царды цырагъдарӕг уӕнт!

Базард:
Кад ӕмӕ радимӕ фидӕнмӕ кӕс!
Фарнимӕ абузӕд, ронгау, дӕ цард!
Амонд, мысайнагау, адӕмтӕн хӕсс!
Уастырджи, рафӕлгӕс, Табу Дӕхицӕн!

Latin script

Zærin xur jæ tyntæ nyvændy fælmæn
Næ fydælty ragon uæzægyl rædauæj
Arvy byn kaly, færdygau, tæmæn’
Iryston jæ adæmty farnæj.

Zamanty taræj ærttivy, zyngau,
Dæ uidag — næ Ivhuyd, næ Abon, næ Fidæn…
Barvæss næ kuyvdyl, Xuycæutty Xuycau!
Uastyrdži, rafælgæs, tabu — Dæxicæn!

Bazard:
Kad æmæ radimæ fidænmæ kæs!
Amondæj abuzæd, rongau, dæ card!
Amond, mysajnagau, fidænma xæss!
Dæ kæstær dyn basguyxæd kard æmæ uart!

Fæltæræj-fæltærmæ fæcæuæd dæ farn!
Ryn æmæ sonæj dæ xizæd qysmæt!
Xistæry namys, kæstæry æxsar
Xurau dyn cardy cyrahdaræg uænt!

Bazard:
Kad æmæ radimæ fidænmæ kæs!
Farnimæ abuzæd, rongau, dæ card!
Amond, mysajnagau, adæmtæn xæss!
Uastyrdži, rafælgæs, Tabu Dæxicæn!

IPA transcription (Note: See Help:IPA/Ossetian and Ossetian language § Phonology.)

[z̠ɐ.ˈrin xur jɐ tɘn.ˈtɐ nɘ.ˈvɐn.dɘ fɐɫ.ˈmɐn |]
[nɐ fɘ.ˈdɐɫ.tʰɘ ˈra.gon wɐ.ˈz̠ɐ.gɘɫ rɐ.ˈda.wɐj ‖]
[ˈar.vɘ bɘn ˈka.ɫɘ fɐr.ˈdɘ.gaw tʰɐ.ˈmɐn |]
[ˈi.rɘs̠.ton jɐ ˈa.dɐm.tʰɘ ˈfar.nɐj ǁ]

[ˈz̠a.man.tʰɘ ˈtʰa.rɐj ɐrt.ˈtʰi.vɘ z̠ɘŋ.ˈgaw |]
[dɐ ˈwi.dag nɐ ˈiv.ɣʷɘd nɐ ˈa.bon nɐ ˈfi.dɐn ǁ]
[ˈbar.vɐs̠ː nɐ kʷɘv.ˈdɘɫ xʷɘ.ˈ(t͡)sɐwt.tʰɘ xʷɘ.ˈ(t͡)saw |]
[ˈwas̠.tɘr.d͡ʒi ˈra.fɐɫ.gɐs̠ ˈtʰa.bu dɐ.ˈxi.(t͡)sɐn ǁ]

[ˈba.z̠ard]
[kad ɐ.ˈmɐ ˈra.di.mɐ ˈfi.dɐn.mɐ kɐs̠ |]
[ˈa.mon.dɐj ˈa.bu.z̠ɐd ˈroŋ.gaw dɐ (t͡)sard ‖]
[ˈa.mond mɘ.ˈs̠aj.na.gaw ˈfi.dɐn.ma xɐs̠ː |]
[dɐ kɐs̠.ˈtɐr dɘn ˈbas̠.gʷɘ.xɐd kard ɐ.ˈmɐ wart ‖]

[fɐɫ.ˈtʰɐ.rɐj fɐɫ.ˈtʰɐr.mɐ fɐ.ˈ(t͡)sɐ.wɐd dɐ farn |]
[rɘn ɐ.ˈmɐ ˈs̠o.nɐj dɐ ˈxi.z̠ɐd qɘs̠.ˈmɐt ‖]
[ˈxis̠.tɐ.rɘ ˈna.mɘs̠ kɐs̠.ˈtɐ.rɘ ɐx.ˈs̠ar |]
[ˈxu.raw dɘn ˈ(t͡)sar.dɘ (t͡)sɘ.ˈraɣ.da.rɐg wɐnt ‖]

[ˈba.z̠ard]
[kad ɐ.ˈmɐ ˈra.di.mɐ ˈfi.dɐn.mɐ kɐs̠ |]
[ˈfar.ni.mɐ ˈa.bu.z̠ɐd ˈroŋ.gaw dɐ (t͡)sard ‖]
[ˈa.mond mɘ.ˈs̠aj.na.gaw ˈa.dɐm.tʰɐn xɐs̠ː |]
[ˈwas̠.tɘr.d͡ʒi ˈra.fɐɫ.gɐs̠ ˈtʰa.bu dɐ.ˈxi.(t͡)sɐn ‖]

English translation

The golden sun spreadeth its rays
Generously upon the homeland of our forebears.
From the sky light shineth like jewels
By Ossetia as the farn of her peoples.

Gleaming from times of darkness like fire;
Thy source, our past, our present, our future.
Reject not our devotional feast, O God of Gods;
Look upon us, Wastyrdzhi, praise to thee.

Chorus:
Honourably look into the future;
May thy life be joyous like ambrosia.
Sacredly bring happiness into the future;
May thy young excel with sword and shield.

May thy farn be passed down through generations;
May fate protect thee from sickness and woe.
May the honour of the old, the valour of the young
Bear the light in thy life like the sun.

Chorus:
Honourably look into the future;
May thy farn be joyous like ambrosia.
Sacredly bring happiness into the nations;
Look upon us, Wastyrdzhi, praise to thee!

=== Lyrics by Felix Tsarikati ===
Digital instrumental and vocal version sung by Felix Tsarikati

Ossetian original

Cyrillic script

Ӕнусты цӕра нӕ Ирыстон
Фӕрнӕйдзаг уа йӕ райсомы бон
Цъититӕй суадӕттӕ хурмӕ тындзынц
Цардамон хохӕй быдырмӕ хӕссынц!

Мӕ фыдыбӕстӕ мӕ Ирыстон
Йӕ фырттӕй ныфсджын уа йӕ фыдӕны бон
Рухс уӕд дӕ ном Задӕлески нана
Фидар кӕстӕртӕй сӕрбӕрзонд куыд уай!

Бирӕ бӕркӕддтӕ Ирыстон уӕд кадджын
Хицау ӕмӕ адӕмы фарнӕй уӕд хайджын
Дидинӕг ракалӕд хӕсты быдыр
Сау мигътӕ ахӕссӕд дымгӕ дӕрдтыл

Хуссар Цӕгат Ир сӕ нӕртон ӕгъдауыл
Иумӕ цӕудзысты фыдӕлты фӕндагыл
Хетӕджы Уастырджи сӕ мбал фӕуӕд
Нӕ Уарзон Ирыстон ӕнусты цӕрӕд!

Latin script

Ænusty cæra næ Iryston
Færnæjdzag ua jæ rajsomy bon
Chititæj suadættæ xurmæ tyndzync
Cardamon xoxæj bydyrmæ xæssync!

Mæ fydybæstæ mæ Iryston
Jæ fyrttæj nyfsdžyn ua jæ fydæny bon
Ruxs uæd dæ nom Zadælesky nana
Fidar kæstærtæj særbærzond kuyd uaj!

Biræ bærkæddtæ Iryston uæd kaddžyn
Xicau æmæ adæmy farnæj uæd xajdžyn
Didinæg rakalæd xæsty bydyr
Sau mihtæ axæssæd dymgæ dærdtyl

Xussar Cægat Ir sæ nærton æhdauyl
Iumæ cæudžysty fydælty fændagyl
Xetædžy Uastyrdži sæ mbal fæuæd
Næ Uarzon Iryston ænusty cæræd!

English translation

Our Ossetia shall always eternal be
In the morning thou bloomest brightly
And the sun shineth above thee
Thy valleys and mountains shall for centuries stand

My pride, my Ossetia
All thy sons and their fathers are eternal
Let us carry thy name through the years
And from now our ancestors are a wise folk

Our Ossetia hath many feats
All thy peoples are grateful
All thy glades are blooming
May the wind blow the dark clouds away

South and North Ossetia are united always
May the glory of our ancestors grow
Khetag and Wastyrdzhi shall be with us always
Our beloved Ossetia shall be eternal always

== See also ==
- State Anthem of the Republic of South Ossetia
