= 2021 Russian gubernatorial elections =

- 17–19 September 2021

12 Heads of Federal Subjects from 85
- 2021 Russian regional elections: Gubernatorial Legislative Legislative of another region Legislative both Gubernatorial and legislative

Gubernatorial elections in 2021 were held on a single-voting day, September 19, along with the elections to the 8th State Duma, Russia's lower house. Offices of the heads of 12 constituent entities of the Federation were contested. By decision of the Central Election Commission of Russia, voting was held for three days in a row — September 17, 18, and 19, 2021.

== List ==
=== Direct elections ===
All incumbent governors have won.

Region	Incumbent	Incumbent status	Losing candidates
Khabarovsk Krai	Mikhail Degtyarev (LDPR)	Acting governor appointed after ousting of Sergei Furgal	Marina Kim (SR-ZP); Vladimir Parfyonov (RPPS); Babek Yusif oglu Mamedov (Rodina)
Belgorod Oblast	Vyacheslav Gladkov (UR)	Acting governor	Vladimir Abelmazov (RPPS); Yevgeny Dryomov (LDPR); Yury Osetrov (SR-ZP); Kirill Skachko (CPRF)
Mordovia	Artyom Zdunov (UR)	Acting governor appointed after resignation of Vladimir Volkov	Dmitry Kuzyakin (CPRF); Yevgeny Tyurin (LDPR); Aleksandr Lemkin (RPPS)
Penza Oblast	Oleg Melnichenko (UR)	Acting governor appointed after ousting of Ivan Belozertsev	Pyotr Chugai (RPPS); Oleg Shalyapin (CPRF); Aleksandr Vasilyev (LDPR); Aleksey Shpagin (SR-ZP)
Tuva	Vladislav Khovalyg (UR)	Acting head of the republic appointed after resignation of Sholban Kara-ool	Aylanmaa Kan-ool (The Greens); Andrey Sat (PR); Choygana Seden-ool (CPRF); Vladimir Chesnokov (CPCR)
Ulyanovsk Oblast	Aleksey Russkikh (CPRF)	Acting governor appointed after resignation of Sergey Morozov	Gennady Budarin (The Greens); Svetlana Goreva (NL); Sergey Marinin (LDPR)
Tula Oblast	Aleksey Dyumin	Term-expiring	Yury Moiseyev (CPCR); Vladimir Isakov (CPRF); Vladimir Rostovtsev (RPPS)
Tver Oblast	Igor Rudenya (UR)	Term-expiring	Lyudmila Vorobyova (CPRF); Oleg Gorlov (LDPR); Dmitry Ignatkov (SR-ZP); Ilya Kleymyonov (CPCR)
Chechnya	Ramzan Kadyrov (UR)	Term-expiring	Isa Khajimuradov (SR-ZP); Khalid Nakayev (CPRF)

=== Vote in parliament ===
Unlike other gubernatorial elections, voting for the head of Dagestan was scheduled on 14 October 2021.

Region	Incumbent	Incumbent status	Candidates	Governor-elect
Dagestan	Sergey Melikov	Acting governor appointed after resignation of Vladimir Vasilyev	Samir Abdulkhalikov (CPRF); Kamil Davdiev (SR-ZP)	Sergey Melikov 82 / 90
North Ossetia	Sergey Menyaylo (UR)	Acting governor appointed after resignation of Vyacheslav Bitarov	Medeya Eldzarova (CPRF); Valery Balikoyev (SR-ZP)	Sergey Menyaylo 57 / 70
Karachay-Cherkessia	Rashid Temrezov (UR)	Term-expiring	Renat Akbayev (SR-ZP); Oleg Zhedyayev (LDPR)	Rashid Temrezov 48 / 50
