= City of Angels (Beslan) =

Cemetery in Beslan, Russia

- Город ангелов
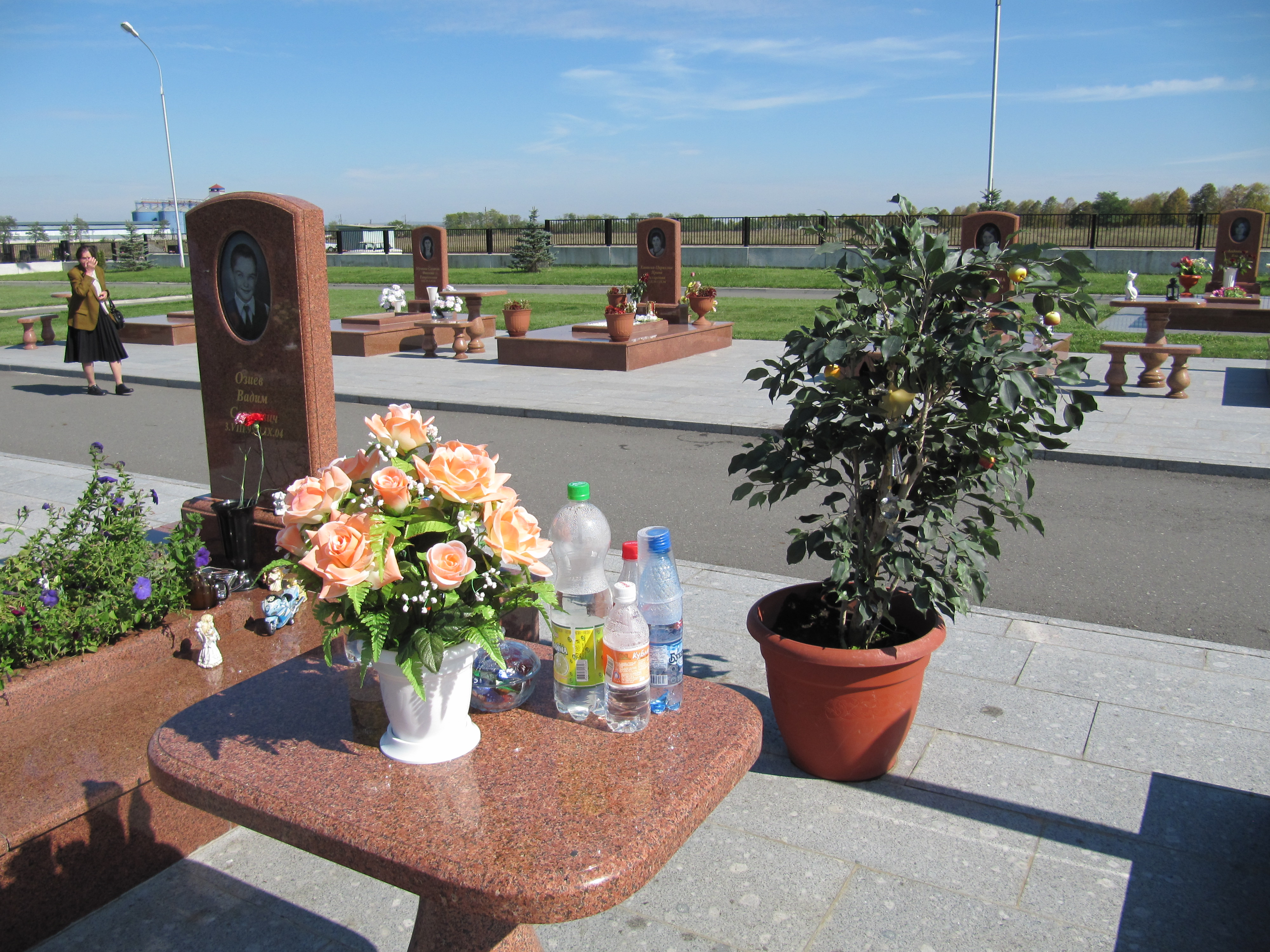
- Interactive map of City of Angels
- Location: Komintern Street 99, Beslan, Russia
- Coordinates: 43.191°N 44.566°E
- Type: Cemetery
- Opening date: 2005

City of Angels is the name of a memorial cemetery located on the northeastern outskirts of Beslan, where 334 people killed during the Beslan school siege on September 1–3 are buried. The cemetery contains 266 burials, 186 of the graves are children’s graves.

== History ==
The cemetery known as the City of Angels was created in 2005 after the Beslan school siege on 1–3 September 2004, one of the deadliest terrorist attacks in modern Russian history. More than 334 people were killed during the hostage crisis, including 186 children. The cemetery became a central site of mourning for relatives of the victims and for visitors commemorating the tragedy. The burial ground was officially organized shortly after the attack in order to create a unified memorial space for those killed. Construction of the memorial complex began in 2004 and continued into the following year.

The name City of Angels emerged from the large number of children among the victims and was widely adopted in public discourse and commemorative events dedicated to the tragedy. The cemetery became one of the most recognizable symbols of remembrance associated with the Beslan attack.

== Design and memorial elements ==
The cemetery forms part of a broader memorial complex dedicated to the victims of the Beslan siege. Each grave is marked with a uniform headstone bearing the victim’s name and portrait, reflecting the intention to commemorate the victims collectively while preserving their individual identities.

One of the central monuments on the site is the sculpture Tree of Sorrow which commemorates the victims of the attack. The monument depicts four female figures raising their arms toward the sky, forming the trunk and branches of a symbolic tree. The sculpture represents grief and mourning shared by families of the victims and by the broader community.

Another memorial element on the cemetery grounds is a khachkar donated by children from Armenia. The khachkar, a traditional Armenian cross-stone monument, symbolizes solidarity and remembrance and reflects the international response to the tragedy. To the left of the cross carved on the khachkar stands a small drinking fountain. At its base are sculptures of children holding out cups, accompanied by the inscription: "We beg you, give the children water".

The complex also includes a monument dedicated to members of spetsnaz forces who were killed during the assault on School No. 1 in Beslan while attempting to rescue hostages. The monument depicts a military cloak spread on the ground, with a helmet and body armor placed on top of it. Beneath them lie a children's toy and a book. The inscription on the granite slab reads: "You are forever in the heart of Beslan, the men who shielded children with your hearts".

== Memorial complex ==
The necropolis is part of the larger memorial complex known as the City of Angels, which has been designated a cultural heritage site of regional significance in the Republic of North Ossetia–Alania.

In addition to the cemetery itself, the memorial complex includes the preserved building of School No. 1 where the siege took place, a sports hall, and commemorative plaques listing the names of those killed during the attack. The site also contains a monument to the fallen spetsnaz commander Dmitry Razumovsky and the Orthodox Church of the New Martyrs of Russia.

Each year on the anniversary of the attack, memorial ceremonies are held at the cemetery. Relatives of the victims, survivors, and officials gather at the site to lay flowers and observe moments of silence in remembrance of those who died in the siege.

== Gallery ==
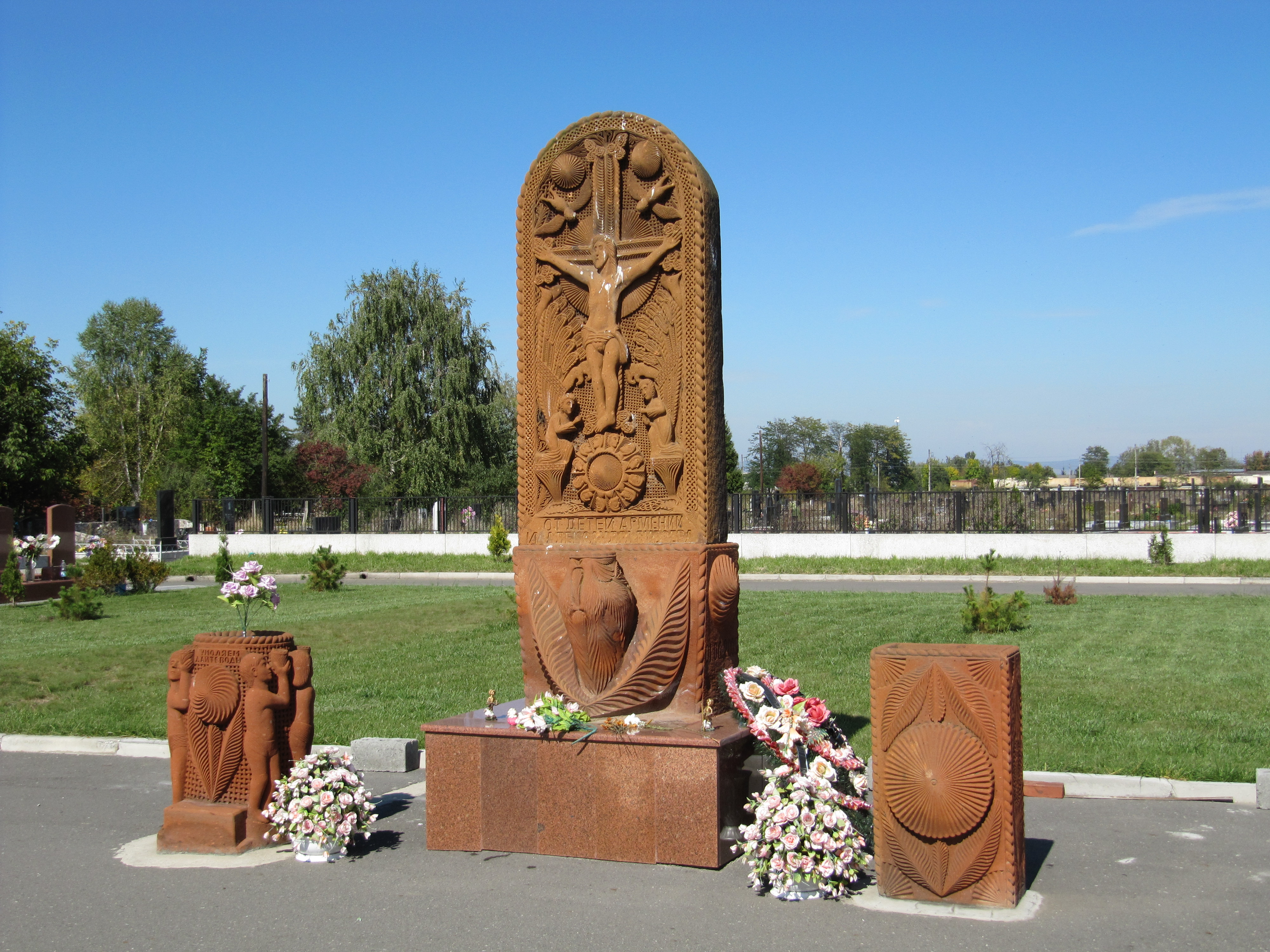
Khachkar donated by children of Armenia

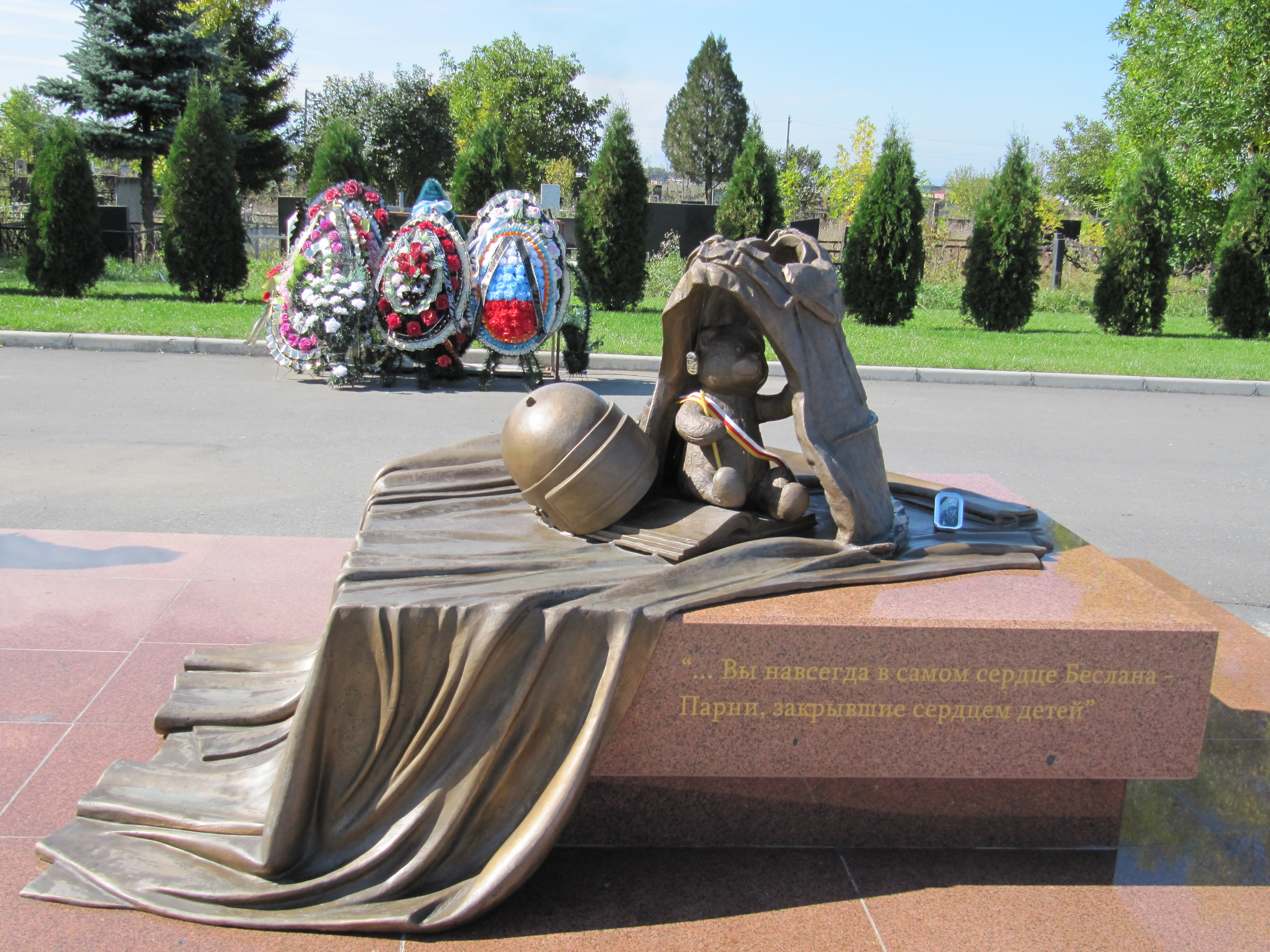
Monument to fallen spetsnaz soldiers

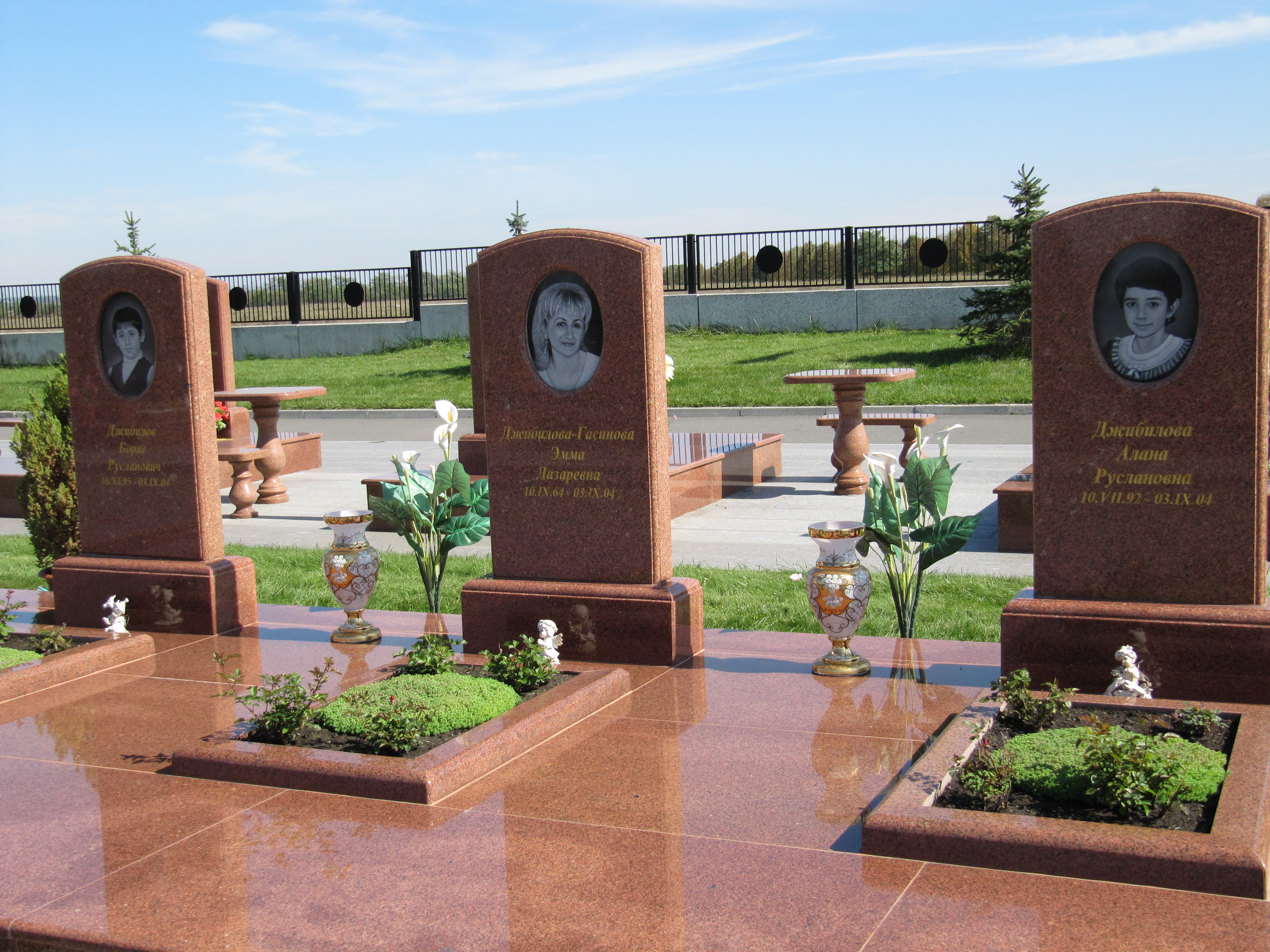
Graves of the victims
