= 1998 Russian gubernatorial elections =

- 18 January – 21 June 1998

10 Heads of Federal Subjects from 89
- 1998 Russian regional elections: Gubernatorial Gubernatorial (of another subject) Legislative Gubernatorial and legislative Referendum, gubernatorial and legislative

Gubernatorial elections in 1998 took place in ten regions of the Russian Federation.

== Overview ==
1998 saw the re-election of the heads of administrations of the "first wave" elected in April 1993 in Lipetsk, Penza and Smolensk Oblasts and Krasnoyarsk Krai, as well as the presidents of Bashkortostan, Buryatia, Ingushetia and North Ossetia and the chairman of the government of Karelia. For the first time, direct elections were held in Mordovia. The transition to a presidential system was discussed in the last two parliamentary republics, Dagestan and Udmurtia. In Dagestan, on June 25, the Chairman of the State Council Magomedali Magomedov was re-elected for a new term by the Constitutional Assembly, same as in 1994. In Udmurtia, members of the State Council constantly rejected bills on direct elections introduction, proposed by the Council's speaker.

== Race summary ==
Federal subject	Incumbent	Incumbent since	Election day	Candidates	Result
North Ossetia	Akhsarbek Galazov	1994	18 January	✓ Alexander Dzasokhov 76.09%; Akhsarbek Galazov (NDR) 9.67%; Arkady Kadokhov 6.29%	Incumbent lost re-election. New president elected.
Mordovia	Nikolay Merkushkin	1995	15 February	✓ Nikolay Merkushkin 90.85%; Aleksey Sharov 3.13%	Incumbent re-elected.
Ingushetia	Ruslan Aushev	1993	1 March	✓ Ruslan Aushev 66.51%; Issa Kostoyev 13.36%; Mukharbek Aushev 9.12%	Incumbent re-elected.
Lipetsk Oblast	Mikhail Narolin	1993	12 April	✓ Oleg Korolyov (CPRF support) 79.52%; Mikhail Narolin (NDR) 13.81%	Incumbent lost re-election. New governor elected.
Penza Oblast	Anatoly Kovlyagin	1993	12 April	✓ Vasily Bochkaryov 61.34%; Yury Lyzhin (CPRF) 16.46%; Anatoly Kovlyagin (NDR) 13.09%; Aleksandr Kalashnikov 5.32%	Incumbent lost re-election. New governor elected.
Karelia	Viktor Stepanov	1994	26 April (first round)	Sergey Katanandov 37.78%; Viktor Stepanov 35.07%; Aleksandr Chazhengin 8.62%	Incumbent lost re-election. New premier elected.
Karelia	Viktor Stepanov	1994	17 May (runoff)	✓ Sergey Katanandov 49.48%; Viktor Stepanov 43.16%	Incumbent lost re-election. New premier elected.
Krasnoyarsk Krai	Valery Zubov	1993	26 April (first round)	Alexander Lebed (NRPR) 45.11%; Valery Zubov (NDR) 35.40%; Pyotr Romanov (CPRF) 12.98%	Incumbent lost re-election. New governor elected.
Krasnoyarsk Krai	Valery Zubov	1993	17 May (runoff)	✓ Alexander Lebed 57.29%; Valery Zubov 38.18%	Incumbent lost re-election. New governor elected.
Smolensk Oblast	Anatoly Glushenkov	1993	26 April (first round)	Aleksandr Prokhorov (CPRF) 46.52%; Anatoly Glushenkov (NDR) 26.9%; Boris Reva 10.05%	Incumbent lost re-election. New governor elected.
Smolensk Oblast	Anatoly Glushenkov	1993	17 May (runoff)	✓ Aleksandr Prokhorov (CPRF) 67.39%; Anatoly Glushenkov (NDR) 26.49%	Incumbent lost re-election. New governor elected.
Bashkortostan (snap election)	Murtaza Rakhimov	1993	14 June	✓ Murtaza Rakhimov 70.24%; Rif Kazakkulov 8.96%; Against all 17.11%	Incumbent re-elected.
Buryatia	Leonid Potapov	1994	21 June	✓ Leonid Potapov (CPRF) 63.25%; Vladimir Saganov 6.52%; Bato Ochirov 5.73%; Valery Shapovalov 5.51%	Incumbent re-elected.
