= Yanis Kanidis =

Self-sacrificing victim of the 2004 Beslan hostage crisis

- Yanis Kanidis
- Born: January 1, 1930; Tbilisi, Georgian Soviet Socialist Republic
- Died: September 3, 2004 (aged 74); Beslan, North Ossetia, Russia
- Citizenship: USSR; Russia
- Occupation: Teacher
- Awards: Badge of honor “For the protection of human rights”

Yanis Kanidis (Greek: Γιάννης Κανίδης, Russian: Иван Константинович Каниди, romanized: Ivan Constantinovich Kanidi; January 1, 1930 – September 3, 2004) was a Russian physical education teacher, born in Georgia of Caucasus Greek origin.

== Hostage crisis ==
When armed Chechen extremists took more than 1,200 school children and adults hostage on September 1, 2004, in the Russian town of Beslan in North Ossetia, in what has become known as the Beslan school hostage crisis, 74-year-old Kanidis insisted on staying with his students, helped them survive and ultimately died to save their lives.

Two days after the start of the hostage taking, a number of nursing mothers were allowed to leave the building with their babies. The commander of the terrorist squad saw Kanidis, an elderly sickly man, and offered to allow him to leave as well. But Kanidis refused, saying he would stay "with [his] students till the end". And throughout the ordeal, Kanidis guarded and fought for the lives of his students as best he could. When the children were succumbing to the sweltering heat, stuffy air and thirst, Kanidis approached the terrorists insisting that "You have to give them something to drink, at least to the smallest children". When he was heavily beaten with the butt of a rifle by one of the terrorists, Kanidis continued defiantly, "How dare you!? You claim you are people of the Caucasus region, but here in the Caucasus even a dog wouldn't turn down the request of an old man!" At which point the terrorists allowed Kanidis to wet one of the bibs of the children and pass it around to dampen the mouths of the smallest children who were choking from thirst.

The surviving hostages tell how he repeatedly risked his own life in order to save those of the children and how he moved explosives which had been placed near the children, and tried to prevent others from being detonated.

Kanidis was killed on the third day of the hostage taking. The circumstances of his death remain unclear. According to the Israeli newspaper Yediot Aharonot, he was killed when he jumped on a grenade the terrorists had thrown at fleeing children, sacrificing his life to save theirs. According to the Greek/English newspaper Kathimerini, he was shot when he tried to dismantle a ceiling fan that had been wired to an explosive device. According to a feature by C.J. Chivers, Esquire, June 2006 Kanidis was killed while struggling with one of the terrorists, trying to buy time for others to escape. His last words were: "Get the children out!"

Afterwards one of the saved students compared him to the Polish man Janusz Korczak, who had accompanied his pupils to Treblinka.

== Awards and memorials ==
On December 9, 2004, Kanidis was posthumously awarded the medal For Protection of Human Rights by the Russian Government. Later in the same month, one of the two new schools being constructed to replace the school destroyed in the attack was named "Ivan Kanidis".
