= Felix Tsarikati =

Ossetian Russian pop singer and actor (born 1964)

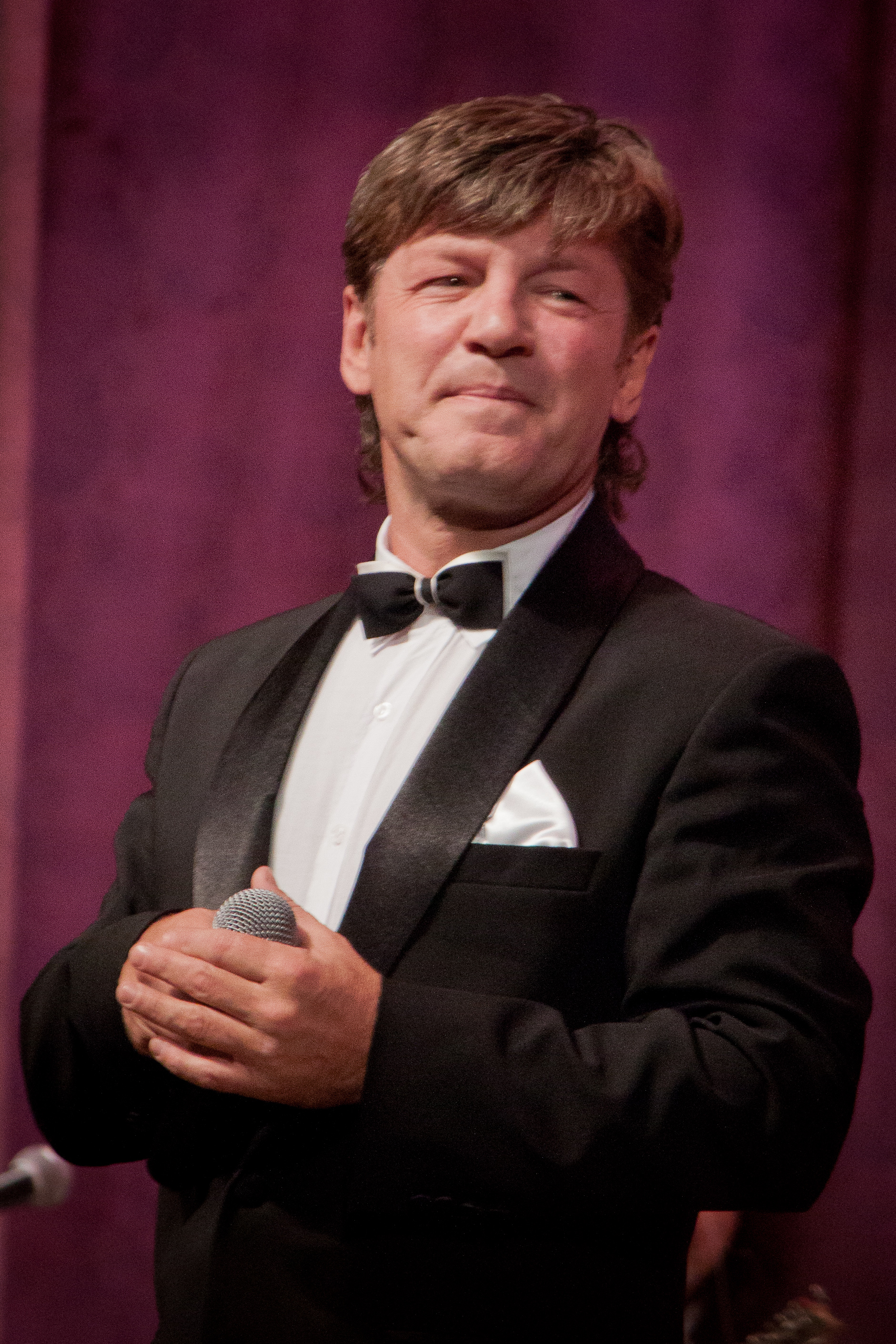

Background information
- Born: Felix Viktorovich Tsarikati; 13 September 1964 (age 62); Nalchik
- Genre: Russian pop
- Occupation: Singer
- Years active: 1991–present

Felix Viktorovich Tsarikati (Russian: Фе́ликс Ви́кторович Царика́ти, Ossetian: Цæрикъати Виктори фурт Феликс; born 13 September 1964, Nalchik, Kabardino-Balkaria) is a Soviet and Russian pop singer (baritone) and an actor of Ossetian origin. Honored Artist of Russia (2000).

== Biography ==
He was born on 13 September 1964 in Nalchik, in the Ossetian family. He was invited to the Bolshoi Theater, as a graduate of Pokrovsky, but refused. His first appearance on the professional stage took place in 1991. Felix is one of the participants of the contest of young performers Jurmala-89, a diploma of the festival Yalta-91, where he won the audience prize, laureate of the Crystal Dolphin Festival (1992). In the same year, 1991, his debut album, entitled The Loud, was released, the first tours in Ossetia took place. Among other things, Felix performed at the art vernissage in Frankfurt (1992) and at the festival of the Days of Russian Culture in Kenya (1997).

In 1993 the main role in the film The Legend of Mount Tbau; In fulfilling this role, Felix nearly died on filming while performing cinematic tricks. In 2006 he performed the soundtrack for the film Break-through.

Performed by the anthem of the Republic of North Ossetia - Alania.

== Personal life ==
In the early 1990s, Felix was called as nephew of the famous businessman Otari Kvantrishvili, but in fact they were not relatives and Kvantrishvili only helped Tsarikati in advancing his career.

He is married and has two daughters.

== Discography ==
- Incomprehensible (1991)
- Oh, These Legs (1996)
- Nothing is forgotten (1997)
- Do Not Let Me Go, Mom! (1998)
- Old Forgotten Waltz (2000)
- Tell Me: Yes, Yes, Yes! (2001)
- Names for All Seasons (2005)
- The Best Songs (2012)
