= Alexander Dzasokhov =

Russian politician (born 1934)

Aleksandr Dzasokhov
- Александр Дзасохов
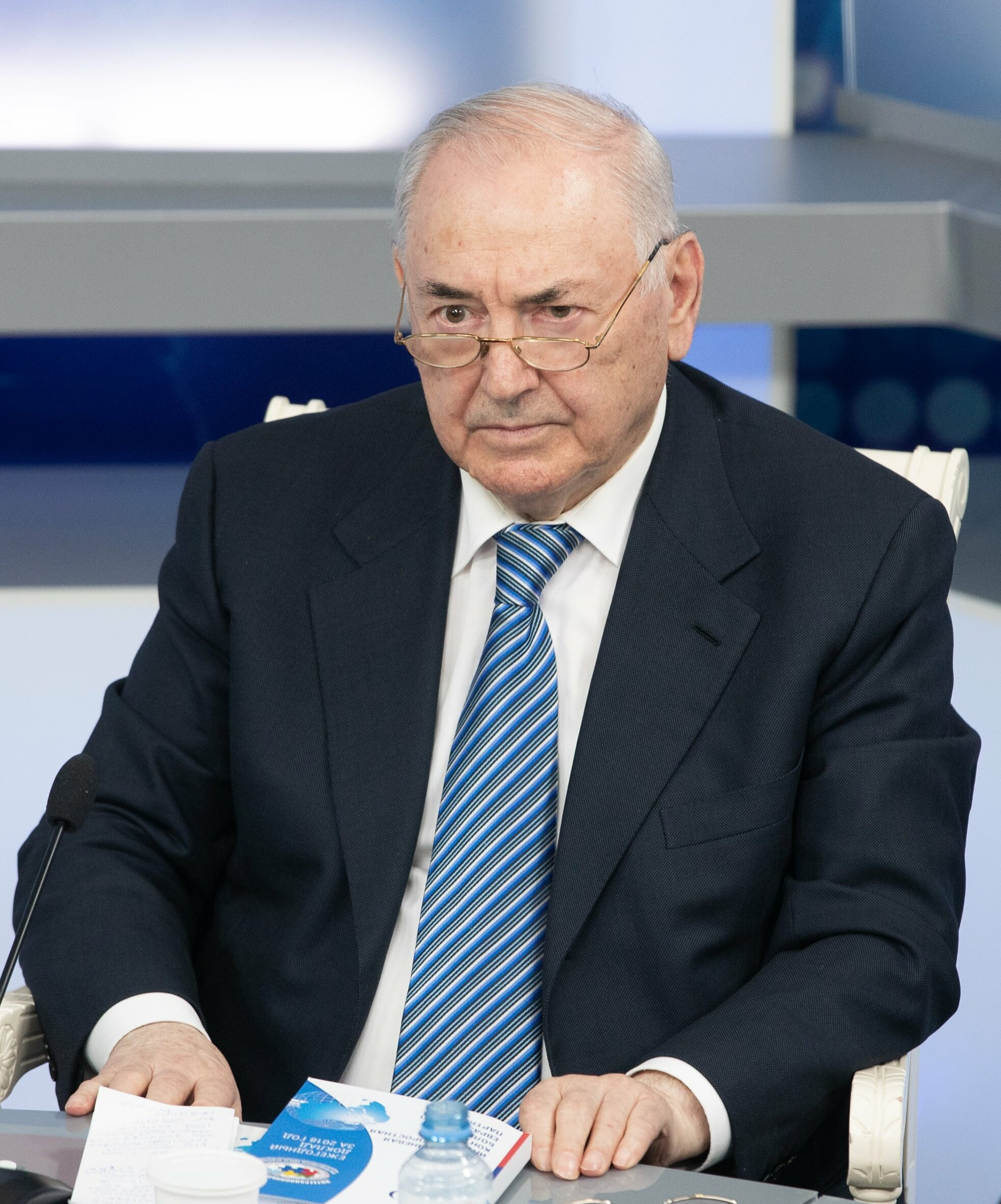
- Dzasokhov in 2019

Russian Federation Senator from the Republic of North Ossetia–Alania
- In office 22 June 2005 – 22 September 2010
- Preceded by: Erik Bugulov
- Succeeded by: Oleg Khatsev

2nd President of North Ossetia
- In office 30 January 1998 – 7 June 2005
- Preceded by: Akhsarbek Galazov
- Succeeded by: Taymuraz Mamsurov

Soviet Ambassador to Syria
- In office 24 September 1986 – 27 January 1989
- Preceded by: Felix Fedotov
- Succeeded by: Alexander Zotov

Personal details
- Born: 3 April 1934 (age 92) Vladikavkaz, North Ossetian ASSR, Russian SFSR, Soviet Union
- Party: CPSU (1957–1991)
- Spouse: Fariz Bahtangireevna Dzasokhova
- Children: Sergei; Teimuraz
- Profession: mining engineer

Aleksandr Sergeyevich Dzasokhov (Russian: Александр Серге́евич Дзасохов; born 3 April 1934) is the former head of the Republic of North Ossetia–Alania.

== Biography ==
He was born 3 April 1934, in Vladikavkaz, graduated in 1957 from the North Caucasus Mining Metallurgical Institute and holds a doctorate in politics. From 1992 to 1993, he was a people's deputy of Russian Federation and from 1993 to 1995, deputy of the State Duma of the Russian Federation. On 18 January 1998, elected president of North Ossetia with 76% of the vote and was re-elected on 27 January 2002, with 56,02% of the vote.

He voluntarily quit his post on 31 May 2005 and was succeeded by Taimuraz Mamsurov. He is currently a Representative of the Republic of North Ossetia in the Federation Republic.

On 13 January 2006, he testified at the trial of Nur-Pashi Kulayev, the lone surviving terrorist from School No. 1 in Beslan. Two buses full of victims arrived in Vladikavkaz on that day to see his long-awaited court appearance. Although many victims consider Dzasokhov among those guilty for the Beslan school hostage crisis from 1 – 3 September 2004, the situational investigation carried out by the Prosecutor General's Office determined that no officials were to blame for the deaths, so he could testify without fear of legal ramifications for himself.

Dzasokhov is a Doctor of Political Science, Ph.D., author of several books and numerous articles. He speaks several foreign languages. Member of Russian Academy of Arts. In 1973 he defended his thesis "The processes of formation of the newly independent states" (a part-time graduate of the Central Committee Academy of Social Sciences).

== Honours and awards ==
- Order "For Merit to the Fatherland";
  - 2nd class (30 March 2004) – for outstanding contribution to the socio-economic development of the construction of federal relations and strengthening inter-ethnic harmony
  - 3rd class (17 March 2001) – for outstanding contribution to strengthening Russian statehood, friendship and cooperation between nations
  - 4th class (23 April 2009) – for services to law-and long-term fruitful work
- Order of the October Revolution (1981)
- Order of the Red Banner of Labour (1971)
- Order of Friendship of Peoples (1984)
- Medal "In Commemoration of the 850th Anniversary of Moscow" (1997)
- Medal "In Commemoration of the 1000th Anniversary of Kazan" (2005)
- Order of Honour (2014)
- State Awards of Afghanistan, Hungary, Vietnam, and several other states
- Order of Holy Prince Daniel of Moscow, 1st class (Russian Orthodox Church)
- Honorary Member of Russian Academy of Arts

== Other ==
He is fluent in several foreign languages and is an expert in the development processes of newly independent states. In 1973, he defended his Candidate of Historical Sciences dissertation titled "The Solidarity Movement of the Peoples of Asia and Africa as an Important Socio-Political Factor in the Anti-Imperialist Struggle" (via the correspondence postgraduate program of the Academy of Social Sciences under the CPSU Central Committee). He holds a Doctor of Political Sciences degree (1996), with a dissertation titled "Decolonization and Global Social Progress in the Second Half of the 20th Century."

He is a full member of the Russian Academy of Natural Sciences (RANS), Eurasia Department, an honorary member of the Russian Academy of Arts, and a member of the Russian Academy of Creativity.

He serves as Deputy Chairman of the Commission of the Russian Federation for UNESCO Affairs, is a member of its Board of Trustees, and Vice President of the Russian International Affairs Council (RIAC).
