= Akhsarbek Galazov =

Russian politician (1929–2013)

- Ахсарбек Галазов; Галазты Æхсарбег
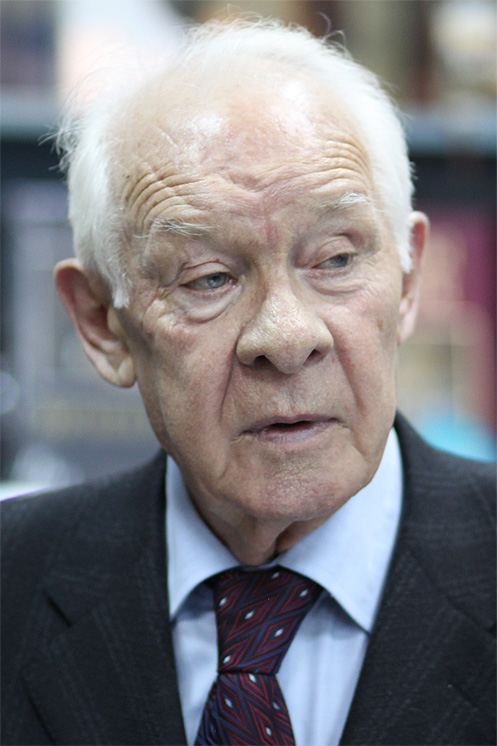
- Galazov in 2010

1st Head of North Ossetia–Alania
- In office 21 January 1994 – 30 January 1998
- Succeeded by: Alexander Dzasokhov

Personal details
- Born: 15 October 1929 Khumalag, RSFSR, Soviet Union
- Died: 10 April 2013 (aged 83) Vladikavkaz, North Ossetia–Alania, Russia
- Party: CPSU (1952–1991)
- Profession: Teacher

Akhsarbek Khadzhimurzayevich Galazov (Russian: Ахсарбе́к Хаджимурза́евич Гала́зов; Iron Ossetic: Галазты Хадзымырзайы фырт Æхсарбег; October 15, 1929 – April 10, 2013) was a Russian scientist and politician. Galazov was born in Pravoberezhny District, at the time part of the Soviet Union. He served as president of the Republic of North Ossetia–Alania (Russia) from 1994 until 1998. In 1938 his father Hadzhimurza Ilyasovich was illegally detained by the Soviet government and several years later died in prison.

== Education and Employment ==
In 1952, he graduated from the State Pedagogical Institute of North Ossetia. From 1952-1958 he worked as a teacher of Russian language and literature and was director of studies at Humalagskoy Secondary School. From 1958 to 1959 he was superintendent of schools of the Ministry of Education of the Soviet Socialist Republic of North Ossetia. From 1959-1960 he served as Director of the Institute of Teachers.

From 1961 to 1975 he was Minister of Education of North Ossetia.

From 1976 to 1990 he was Rector of North Ossetian State University.

From 1990-1991 he was a member of the Central Committee of the CPSU. Elected deputy of the RSFSR.

== Political Activity ==
During the armed conflict in South Ossetia following the collapse of the Soviet Union, he authorized the delivery of humanitarian aid, and negotiated for the peaceful settlement of the situation in South Ossetia. He opposed the liberation of North Ossetia from Russia, but at the same time affirmed the possibility of its association with South Ossetia and the consequential creation of a new state, Alania.

In November 1993, he was nominated for the Federation Council. In the elections he ran as an independent candidate. The turnout was 61.26% of registered voters. Galázov won with 53.54% of the vote.

In January 1994, he was elected the first president of the Republic of North Ossetia and held the position until 1998.
