= Tamerlan Aguzarov =

Russian politician (1963–2016)

- Тамерлан Агузаров; Ӕгъуызарты Тамерлан
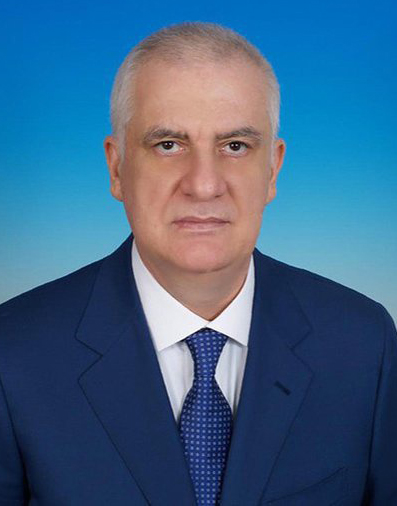

Head of North Ossetia-Alania
- In office June 5, 2015 – February 19, 2016
- President: Vladimir Putin
- Preceded by: Taymuraz Mamsurov
- Succeeded by: Vyacheslav Bitarov

Personal details
- Born: 14 June 1963 Alagir, North Ossetian ASSR , Russian SFSR, USSR
- Died: 19 February 2016 (aged 52) Moscow, Russian Federation
- Party: United Russia
- Profession: Jurist
- Awards

Tamerlan Kimovich Aguzarov (Russian: Тамерлан Кимович Агузаров, Ossetian: Ӕгъуызарты Кимы фырт Тамерлан, romanized: Æghwyzarty Kimy fyrt Tamerlan; 14 June 1963 – 19 February 2016) was a Russian politician who was the head of North Ossetia-Alania from 2015 until his death in 2016.

He served as Chairman of the Supreme Court of the Republic of North Ossetia–Alania from 4 January 1999 to 4 December 2011.From 4 December 2011 to 5 June 2015 he was a deputy of the State Duma of the Federal Assembly of the Russian Federation of the VI convocation.He held the post of Head of the Republic of North Ossetia–Alania from 13 September 2015 to 19 February 2016 (acting head from 5 June to 13 September 2015). He holds a Candidate of Juridical Sciences degree (2004) and the academic title of Professor.

== Family ==
His twin brother, Murat Aguzarov, headed the Federal Service for State Registration, Cadastre and Cartography (Rosreestr) of North Ossetia for more than ten years. In 2016, he ran for the State Duma. In May 2018, he was appointed advisor to the Head of North Ossetia.

His nephews include:

- Alan Aguzarov (born July 1988), a graduate of Kutafin Moscow State Law University, Candidate of Legal Sciences, and a licensed football agent of the Russian Football Union.
- Sergey Aguzarov (born 1990), an investigator of the Federal Security Service (FSB), who worked, among other cases, on the Varvara Karaulova case and the hacker group "Shaltai-Boltai".

== Awards ==
- Order of Friendship (17 January 2005) — for contributions to strengthening the rule of law and many years of dedicated service.
- Commendation of the Government of the Russian Federation (4 July 2013) — for many years of fruitful legislative activity and the development of Russian legislation.
- Order of Friendship (South Ossetia, 16 September 2015) — for personal contribution to the development of integration ties between the Republic of North Ossetia–Alania and the Republic of South Ossetia, and in connection with the 25th anniversary of the proclamation of the Republic of South Ossetia.

Political offices
Preceded by Taymuraz Mamsurov	Head of North Ossetia-Alania; 5 June 2015-19 February 2016	Succeeded by Vyacheslav Bitarov
