= Constitution of North Ossetia–Alania =

Basic law of the North Ossetia-Alania

Emblem of North Ossetia.

The Constitution of the Republic of North Ossetia-Alania (Russian: Конституция Республики Северная Осетия — Алания) is the basic law of the North Ossetia-Alania which was adopted by the North Ossetian government on November 12, 1994. It has been amended 12 times since its ratification, with the most recent amendment being ratified on May 10, 2017.
