= Taymuraz Mamsurov =

Russian politician (born 1954)

- Таймураз Мамсуров; Мамсыраты Таймураз
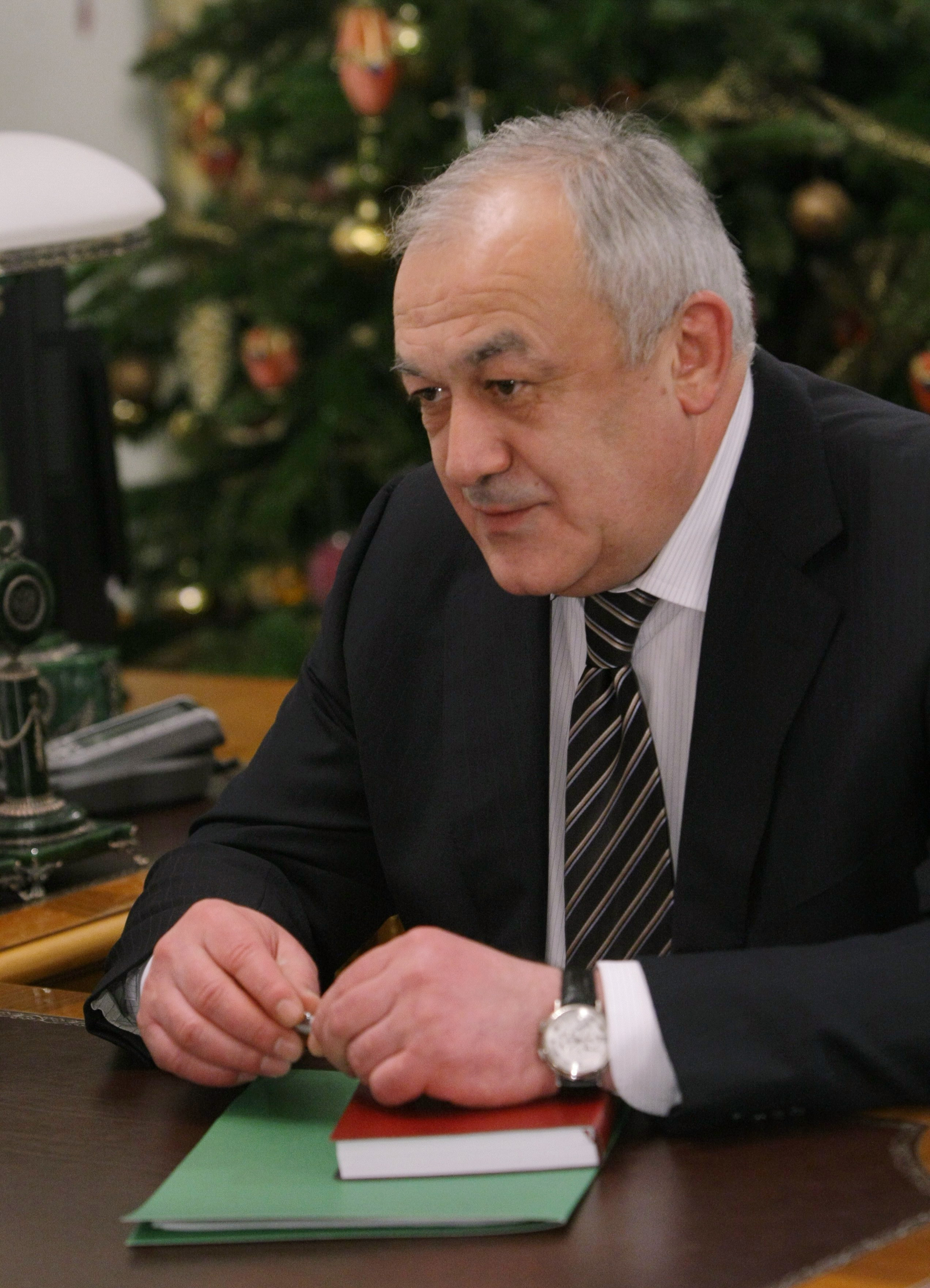
- Mamsurov in 2010

Russian Federation Senator from the Republic of North Ossetia–Alania
- Incumbent
- Assumed office 14 September 2015
- Preceded by: Oleg Khatsev

3rd Head of North Ossetia–Alania
- In office 7 June 2005 – 5 June 2015
- Preceded by: Alexander Dzasokhov
- Succeeded by: Tamerlan Aguzarov

Personal details
- Born: April 13, 1954 (age 71) Beslan, North Ossetian ASSR, Russian SFSR, Soviet Union
- Party: United Russia
- Spouse: Larisa Mamsurova
- Children: Zelim; Zalina; Zarema; Zamira
- Profession: Economist

Taymuraz Dzambekovich Mamsurov (Russian: Таймура́з Дзамбе́кович Мамсу́ров, Ossetian: Мамсыраты Дзамбеджы фырт Таймураз, romanized: Mamsyraty Dzambejy fyrt Taymuraz; b. April 13, 1954) is the former head of the Republic of North Ossetia–Alania, Russia. He succeeded Alexander Dzasokhov, who voluntarily quit his post on May 31, 2005.

== Biography ==
A graduate of the North Caucasian Institute of Mining and Metallurgy, Mamsurov has also obtained a degree in history from the Academy of Social Sciences at the Central Committee of the Communist Party of the Soviet Union (CPSU). He made his career in the Komsomol, "Communist Union of Youth", in the 1970s and advanced through the ranks of the CPSU in the 1980s. He was elected a deputy chairman of the Supreme Council of the Republic of North Ossetia–Alania in 1994 and was then put in charge of the administration of the republic's Pravoberezhny district in 1995. He chaired the North Ossetian government from February 1998 to October 2000 and the republic's parliament from October 19, 2000 until June 7, 2005, when he was approved, at the initiative of the then-President of Russia Vladimir Putin, as the Head of the Republic of North Ossetia–Alania. Mamsurov has been allied with Putin and holds a position in the United Russia party's Supreme Council as well as in the Presidium of Russia's State Council.

Mamsurov's official biography credits him with economic successes in the republic and describes him as a "centrist" politician with liberal views.

Mamsurov's rule in North Ossetia coincided with a deterioration of the relations with the neighboring republic of Ingushetia with which Ossetians fought a war over the Prigorodny district early in the 1990s. He has accused the Ingushetian authorities of deliberately stirring up the dispute between the two republics and waging an "information war" against North Ossetia. Mamsurov also supports closer cooperation with South Ossetia, Georgia's breakaway region which seeks integration with Russia though a union with North Ossetia. In July 2008, he accused the Western diplomats of plotting a "Jesuitical plan" of uniting South Ossetia and North Ossetia into a single entity in order to then push it into NATO through Georgia.

== Personal life ==
Mamsurov is married, and he has three children. His hobbies are philosophy and history.
