= Sergey Menyaylo =

Russian politician, military figure and statesman (born 1960)

- Сергей Меняйло
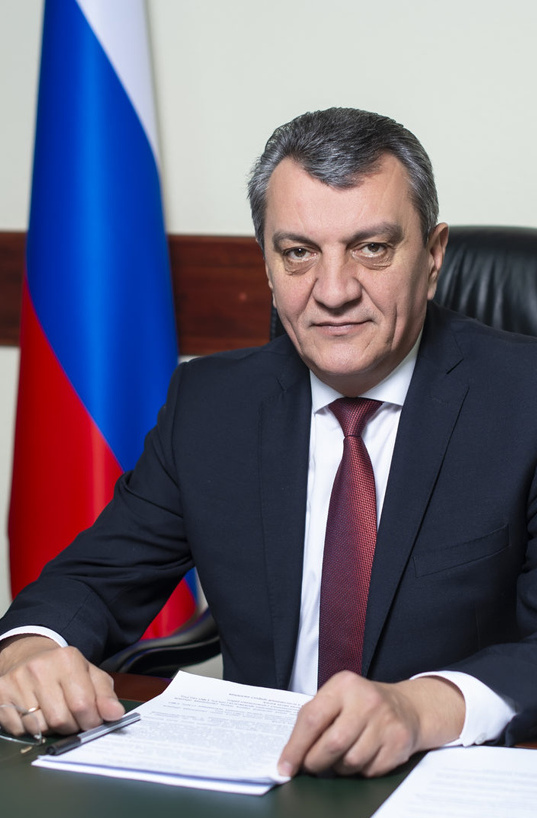
- Menyaylo in 2016

6th Head of North Ossetia-Alania
- Incumbent
- Assumed office 9 April 2021; Acting until 19 September 2021
- President: Vladimir Putin
- Preceded by: Vyacheslav Bitarov

5th Presidential Envoy to the Siberian Federal District
- In office 28 July 2016 – 9 April 2021
- President: Vladimir Putin
- Preceded by: Nikolay Rogozhkin
- Succeeded by: Anatoly Seryshev

Governor of Sevastopol
- In office 14 April 2014 – 28 July 2016
- Preceded by: Aleksei Chaly (acting)
- Succeeded by: Dmitry Ovsyannikov

Personal details
- Born: Sergey Ivanovich Menyaylo; 22 August 1960 (age 65) Alagir, North Ossetian ASSR, Russian SFSR, Soviet Union
- Party: United Russia

Military service
- Allegiance: Soviet Union; Russia
- Branch/service: Soviet Navy; Russian Navy
- Years of service: 1979–2011
- Rank: Vice Admiral
- Battles/wars: Russo-Georgian War

Sergey Ivanovich Menyaylo (Russian: Сергей Иванович Меняйло; born 22 August 1960) is a Russian military figure and statesman. He has been Head of the Republic of North Ossetia since 9 April 2021.

Deputy commander of the Black Sea Fleet between 2009 and 2011. He served as the Governor of Sevastopol between 2014 and 2016, but left the post when he was appointed to be a Presidential Envoy to the Siberian Federal District (2016—2021).

He has the military rank of Vice admiral and the federal state civilian service rank of 1st class Active State Councillor of the Russian Federation.

== Biography ==
Sergey Menyaylo was born in Alagir on 22 August 1960 to a Russian father and an Ossetian mother. In 1983, he graduated as an engineer-navigator from the Caspian Higher Naval Red Banner School (now called the Azerbaijan Higher Naval Academy), and served in the Northern Fleet.

In 1990 he was elected a member of the Murmansk Regional Council. In 2008 he participated in the Russo-Georgian War. The following year, he was appointed deputy commander of the Black Sea Fleet by Presidential decree.

In April 2010, he was candidate of the United Russia party for a position in North Ossetia-Alania.

In December 2011, he left military service.

On 14 April 2014 Aleksei Chaly, the acting Governor of Sevastopol since the beginning of the annexation of Crimea by the Russian Federation of 2014, resigned his position and asked Vladimir Putin to appoint Menyaylo as the "interim governor" of Sevastopol. That same day he was confirmed in position by a presidential decree.

He resigned his position at the end of July 2016, and was later appointed as a Plenipotentiary Representative of the President of the Russian Federation to the Siberian Federal District.

On 19 September 2021, the parliament elected Menyaylo as the 6th Head of North Ossetia-Alania.

=== Russo–Ukrainian War ===
On April 14, 2014, Oleksiy Chaly, who was called "acting governor of Sevastopol" since the beginning of the temporary annexation of Crimea by Russia, offered Putin to appoint Menyayl "acting governor of Sevastopol", which Putin did. At the time of the beginning of the occupation of Crimea by Russia, he managed the state enterprise "Crimean Sea Ports", which acted as a subject of economic activity in the water area of five ports in Crimea. On October 9, 2014, the "Legislative Assembly of Sevastopol" appointed Menyayl "governor of Sevastopol" at the request of Putin. On July 28, 2016, Menyailo resigned and on the same day was appointed representative of the President of Russia in the Siberian Federal District.

In August 2022, Menyailo announced the creation of the Alania Battalion. In February 2023, Menyailo and Russian propagandists visited the temporarily occupied territory of the Zaporizhia region, where he came under fire.

Sanctions

He was sanctioned by the United Kingdom from 29 April 2014 in relation to Russia's actions in Ukraine.

In 2020, the European Union imposed sanctions on Menyajlo in connection with the poisoning of opposition politician Alexei Navalny. The sanctions include a ban on entry into the EU and an asset freeze.
