= Pravoberezhny District, North Ossetia–Alania =

Pravoberezhny District Правобережный район (Russian)
- District

Other transcription(s)
  - Ossetic: Рахизфарсы район
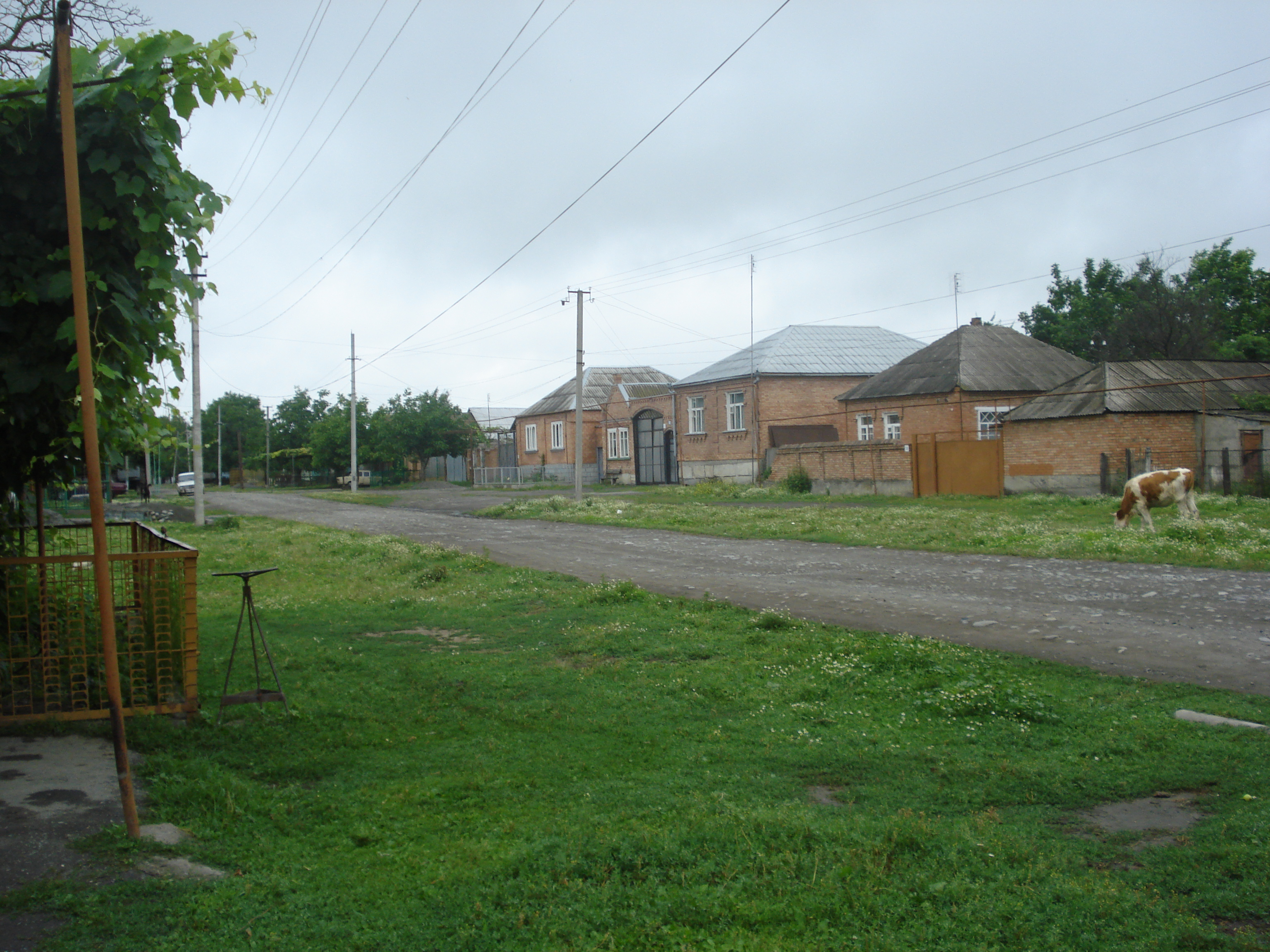
- The selo of Novy Batako in Pravoberezhny District
- Location of Pravoberezhny District in the Republic of North Ossetia–Alania
- Coordinates: 43°12′N 44°34′E
- Country: Russia
- Federal subject: Republic of North Ossetia–Alania
- Established: 7 July 1924
- Administrative center: Beslan

Area
  - Total: 441.29 km^{2} (170.38 sq mi)

Population (2010 Census)
  - Total: 57,063
  - Density: 129.31/km^{2} (334.91/sq mi)
  - Urban: 64.4%
  - Rural: 35.6%

Administrative structure
  - Administrative divisions: 1 Towns under district jurisdiction, 10 Rural okrugs
  - Inhabited localities: 1 cities/towns, 11 rural localities

Municipal structure
  - Municipally incorporated as: Pravoberezhny Municipal District
  - Municipal divisions: 1 urban settlements, 10 rural settlements
- Time zone: UTC+3 (MSK)
- OKTMO ID: 90635000
- Website: http://pravober.ru/

Pravoberezhny District (Russian: Правобере́жный райо́н; Iron Ossetic: Рахизфарсы район, Raxizfarsy rajon) is an administrative and municipal district (raion), one of the eight in the Republic of North Ossetia–Alania, Russia. It is located in the north of the republic. The area of the district is 441.29 square kilometers (170.38 sq mi). Its administrative center is the town of Beslan. Population: 57,063 (2010 census); 55,685 (2002 Census); 49,314 (1989 Soviet census). The population of Beslan accounts for 64.4% of the district's total population.

== Etymology ==
The word "Pravoberezhny" (Russian: Правобережный) in Russian literally means "right-bank" coming from the Russian words "Pravo" (Russian: Право) meaning Right and "Bereg" (Russian: берег) meaning shore. The Ossetian name "Rakhisfars" has the same meaning coming from the Ossetian words "Rakhis" (Iron Ossetic: Рахиз) meaning Right and "Fars" (Iron Ossetic: Фарс) meaning side.

== Notable residents ==
- Issa Pliyev (1903—1979), Soviet military commander, born in Stariy Batakoyurt
