= Vyacheslav Bitarov =

Russian politician

- Вячеслав Битаров; Битарты Вячеслав
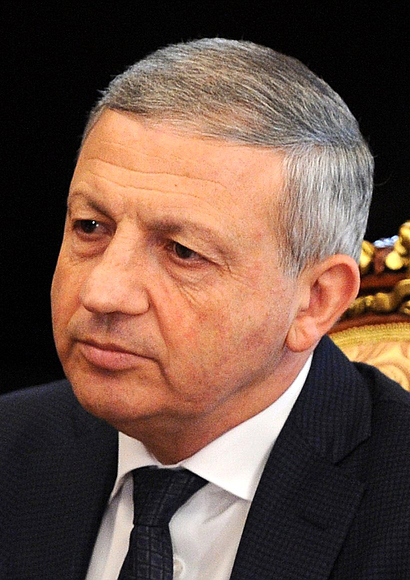
- Bitarov in 2021

Head of North Ossetia-Alania
- In office 18 September 2016 – 12 April 2021
- President: Vladimir Putin
- Preceded by: Tamerlan Aguzarov
- Succeeded by: Sergey Menyaylo (acting)

Personal details
- Born: February 21, 1961 (age 65) Verhny Sadon, North Ossetian ASSR, Russian SFSR, USSR
- Party: United Russia
- Children: 3
- Awards

Vyacheslav Zelimkhanovich Bitarov (Russian: Вячесла́в Зелимха́нович Бита́ров, Iron Ossetic: Битарты Зелимханы фырт Вячеслав; born February 21, 1961) is a Russian politician.

Head of the Republic of North Ossetia-Alania (2016—2021) Chairman of the Government of the Republic of North Ossetia-Alania to 24 September 2015.

He is married and has three children.

Preceded by Tamerlan Aguzarov	Head of the Republic of North Ossetia-Alania; 2016 – 2021	Succeeded by Sergey Menyaylo (acting)
