= Beslan =

Beslan Беслан
- Town

Other transcription(s)
  - Ossetic: Беслӕн
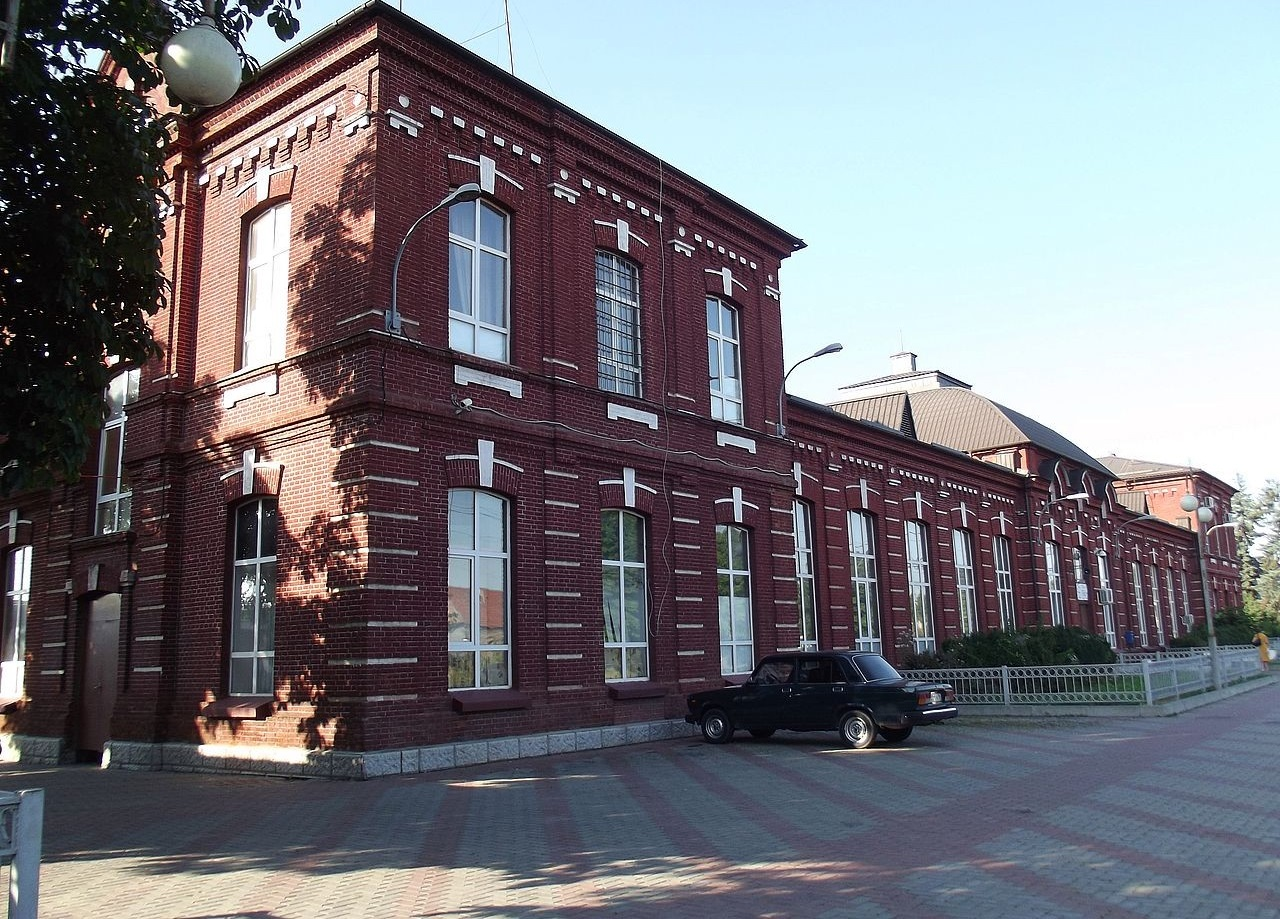
- Railway station in Beslan

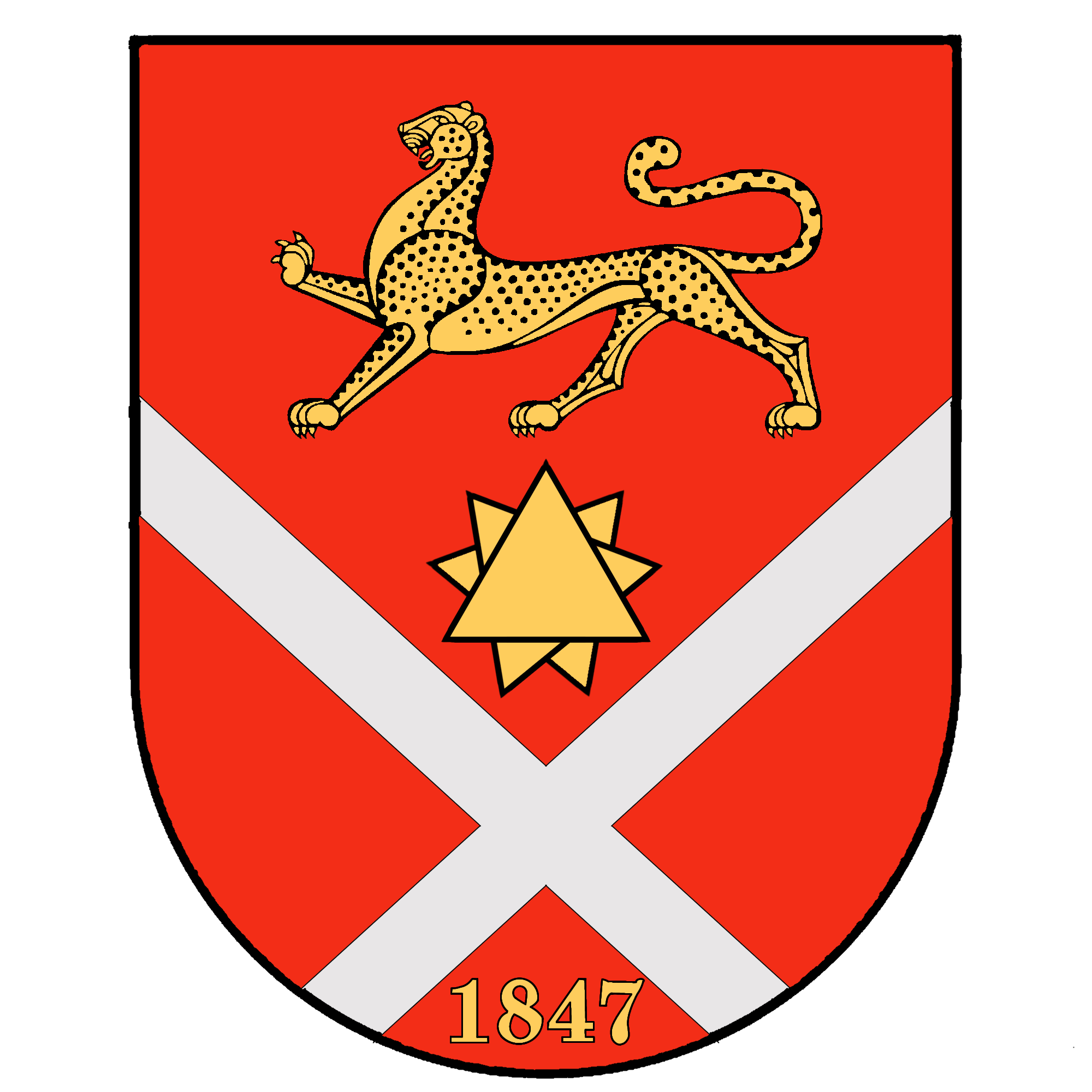
- Coat of arms
- Interactive map of Beslan
- Location of Beslan Beslan (North Ossetia–Alania)
- Coordinates: 43°11′N 44°33′E
- Country: Russia
- Federal subject: North Ossetia–Alania
- Administrative district: Pravoberezhny District
- Town Under District JurisdictionSelsoviet: Beslan
- Founded: 1847
- Elevation: 484 m (1,588 ft)

Population (2010 Census)
  - Total: 36,728
  - Estimate (2023): 36,011 (−2%)

Administrative status
  - Capital of: Pravoberezhny District, Beslan Town Under District Jurisdiction

Municipal status
  - Municipal district: Pravoberezhny Municipal District
  - Urban settlement: Beslanskoye Urban Settlement
  - Capital of: Pravoberezhny Municipal District, Beslanskoye Urban Settlement
- Time zone: UTC+3 (MSK)
- Postal codes: 363020, 363021, 363023–363027, 363029
- Dialing code: +7 86737
- OKTMO ID: 90635101001
- Website: www.beslan.ru

Beslan population
- 2010 Census: 36,728
- 2002 Census: 35,550
- 1989 Census: 32,469
- 1979 Census: 29,879

Beslan (Russian: Беслан; Iron Ossetic: Беслӕн, Beslæn,) is a town and the administrative center of Pravoberezhny District of the Republic of North Ossetia–Alania, Russia, located about 29 kilometers (18 mi) north of the republic's capital Vladikavkaz, close to the border with the Republic of Ingushetia. As of the 2010 Census, its population was 36,728, making it the third largest town in the republic behind Vladikavkaz and Mozdok.

It was previously known as Tulatovo/Tulatovskoye (until 1941) and Iriston (until 1950).

== History ==
Beslan was founded in 1847 by migrants from elsewhere in Ossetia and was unofficially called Beslanykau ("the settlement of Beslan") after a local lord, Beslan Tulatov. In official use, however, the town was known after Tulatov's surname as Tulatovo or Tulatovskoye. It was renamed Iriston (lit. Ossetia) in 1941. From 1942 to 1943 the Germans tried to take Beslan, on the Adyghea-Beslan-Mozdok line. In 1950, when the town was rapidly industrialising, it was renamed Beslan.

=== Beslan school hostage crisis ===
On 1 September 2004, Beslan's School No. 1 was seized by a group of at least thirty-two Islamic terrorists related to the Second Chechen War. The siege ended on 3 September with a bloody shootout between the terrorists and the Russian security forces. According to official data, 334 people were killed, 186 of them children, and hundreds more wounded. All but one of the hostage-takers were killed, with the survivor arrested and later tried and convicted and sentenced to imprisonment.

== Administrative and municipal status ==
Within the framework of administrative divisions, Beslan serves as the administrative center of Pravoberezhny District. As an administrative division, it is incorporated within Pravoberezhny District as Beslan Town Under District Jurisdiction. As a municipal division, Beslan Town Under District Jurisdiction is incorporated within Pravoberezhny Municipal District as Beslanskoye Urban Settlement.

== Economy ==
Beslan is an important railway junction, situated on the main line between Rostov-on-Don and Baku, and is the starting point of a branch line to Vladikavkaz. It is an industrial-agricultural town dominated by a large corn processing plant established in the 1940s.

=== Transportation ===
The town is served by the Beslan Airport.

== Geography ==
Beslan lies about 29 kilometers (18 mi) north of Vladikavkaz, the capital of the republic, and about 1,600 kilometers (1,000 mi) south of Moscow.

== Ethnic groups ==
As of 2021, the ethnic composition of Beslan was:

- Ossetians: 87.9%
- Russians: 9.2%
- Armenians: 1.2%
- Others: 1.7%

== Education ==
One of the schools in Beslan is the Ivan and Konstantin Kanidis School. It was dedicated in 2010 and named after teacher Ivan (Yanis) Kanidis and his son; the teacher died during the Beslan school siege in 2004 at School No. 1. The governments of Greece and Norway paid 2.5 million euros through the United Nations Program of Development to have the school built. The school's athletic programs specialize in soccer.

Another school is located on Kominterna Street. It replaced School No. 1, which closed after the hostage crisis. Officials chose not to give the replacement school, located across the street from School No. 1, a number. Immediately after School No. 1 closed, classes for children who would have attended it were held at School No. 6.

== Notable people ==
- Alan Dzagoev (b. 1990), Russian professional association football player
- Zaurbek Sidakov (b. 1996), a 2020 Olympic champion and two-time World Champion amateur freestyle wrestler
- Yanis Kanidis (b. 1930), former Physical Education teacher, who was killed in the Beslan School Siege, to save the lives of children.
