= Parliament of the Republic of North Ossetia–Alania =

Regional parliament of North Ossetia, Russia

Parliament of the Republic of North Ossetia–Alania Парламент Республики Северная Осетия — Алания
- 7th legislature

Type
- Type: Unicameral

Leadership
- Chairman: Taymuraz Tuskayev, United Russia since 22 September 2022

Structure
- Seats: 70
- Political groups: United Russia (51) SRZP (10) CPRF (9)

Elections
- Voting system: Mixed
- Last election: 11 September 2022
- Next election: 2027

Meeting place
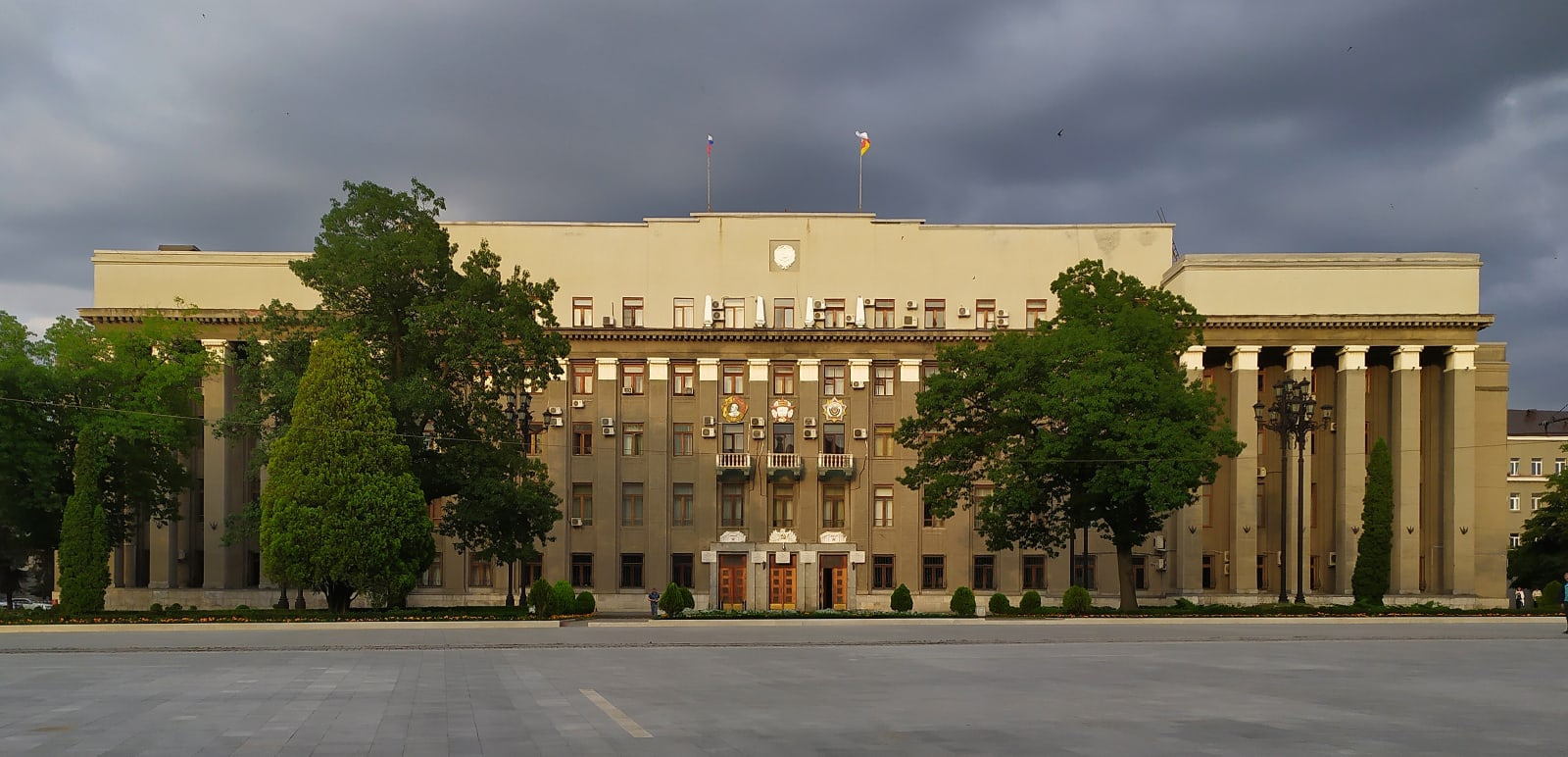
- 1 Freedom Square, Vladikavkaz

Website
- parliament-osetia.ru

The Parliament of the Republic of North Ossetia–Alania (Note: Russian: Парламент Республики Северная Осетия — Алания, romanized: Parlament Respubliki Severnaja Osetija — Alanija; Ossetian: Республикӕ Цӕгат Ирыстоны — Алани Парламент, romanized: Rerpublikæ Cægat Irystony — Alani Parlament) is the regional parliament of North Ossetia–Alania, a federal subject of Russia. A total of 70 deputies are elected for five-year terms.

The presiding officer is the Chairman of the Parliament of North Ossetia–Alania.

== Elections ==
=== 2017 ===
Party	%	Seats
United Russia	59.19	46
Patriots of Russia	15.74	12
A Just Russia	10.22	7
Communist Party of the Russian Federation	6.59	5
Rodina	3.31	0
Liberal Democratic Party of Russia	2.13	0
Registered voters/turnout	58.97	

=== 2022 ===
Party	%	Seats
United Russia	67.88	51
A Just Russia — For Truth	14.27	10
Communist Party of the Russian Federation	12.35	9
Rodina	2.26	0
Liberal Democratic Party of Russia	1.57	0
Registered voters/turnout	68.97	

== See also ==
- List of Chairmen of the Parliament of North Ossetia–Alania
