= Tushi (surname) =

Tushi is a surname. Notable people with the surname include:

- Iase Tushi (fl. 16th century–17th century), Georgian writer
- Nazifa Tushi (born 1996), Bangladeshi model and actress
- Tician Tushi (born 2001), Swiss footballer
