= Omalo =

Omalo ომალო
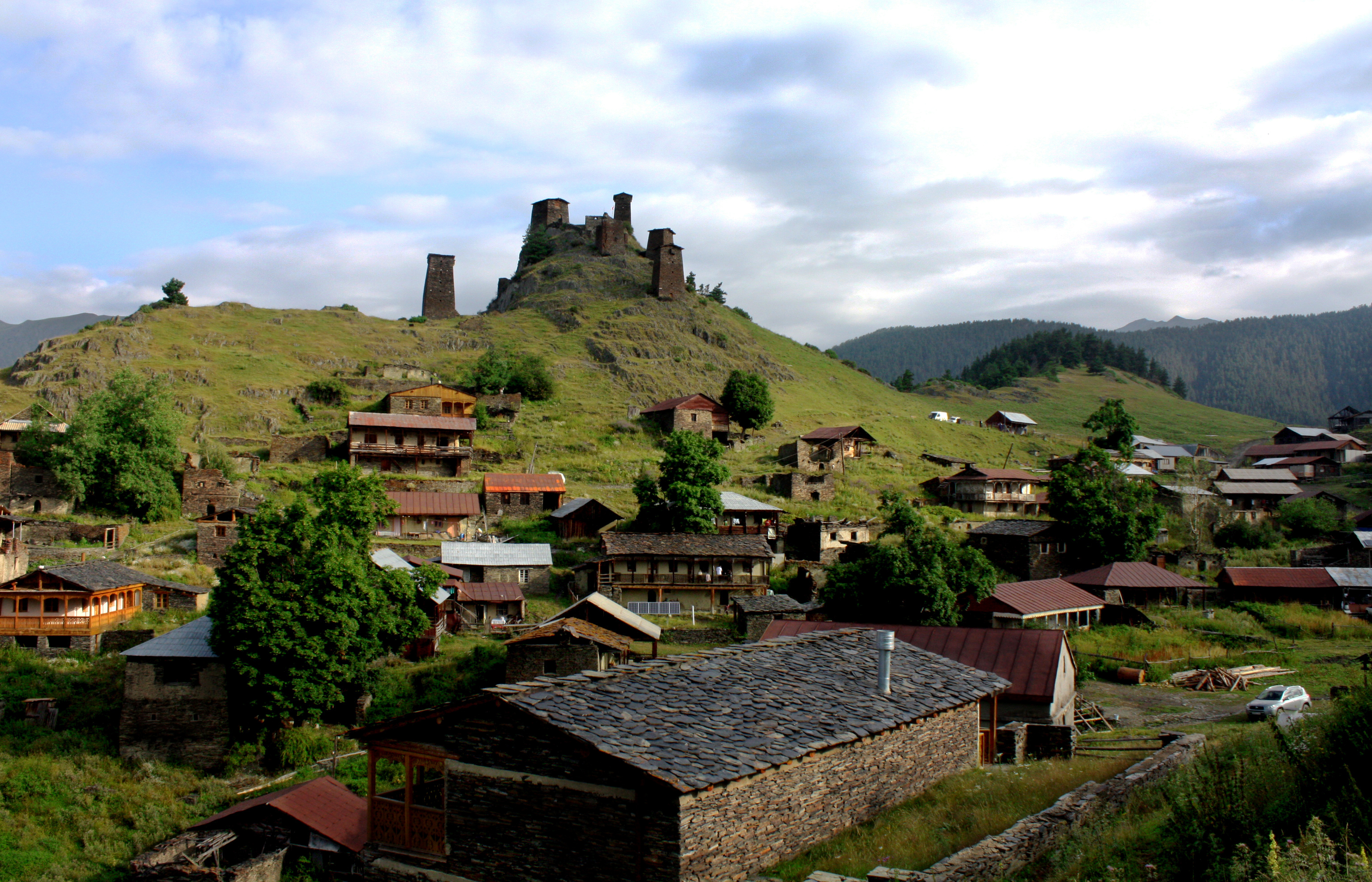

- Location within Georgia Location within Kakheti
- Coordinates: 42°22′44″N 45°37′48″E
- Country: Georgia
- Mkhare: Kakheti
- Municipality: Akhmeta
- Elevation: 1,880 m (6,170 ft)

Population (2014)
  - Total: 37
- Time zone: UTC+4 (Georgian Time)

Omalo (Georgian: ომალო) is a principal village in the historical region of Tusheti, Georgia. Administratively, it is part of the Akhmeta District in Kakheti. It lies between the Greater Caucasus Mountain Range and the Pirikita Range of Tusheti. Due to Omalo's high mountain location on the northern slopes of the Greater Caucasus Mountain Range and the absence of well-maintained roads, it is largely isolated from the rest of Georgia for most of the year. The only access road is through the Abano pass at 2,850 metres (9,350 ft) The fortress of Keselo is a landmark in Zemo (upper) Omalo, this place served as a refuge for locals in wartime.

== See also ==
- Kakheti
- Keselo
- Omalo Ethnographic Museum
