= Shenako =

Shenako შენაქო
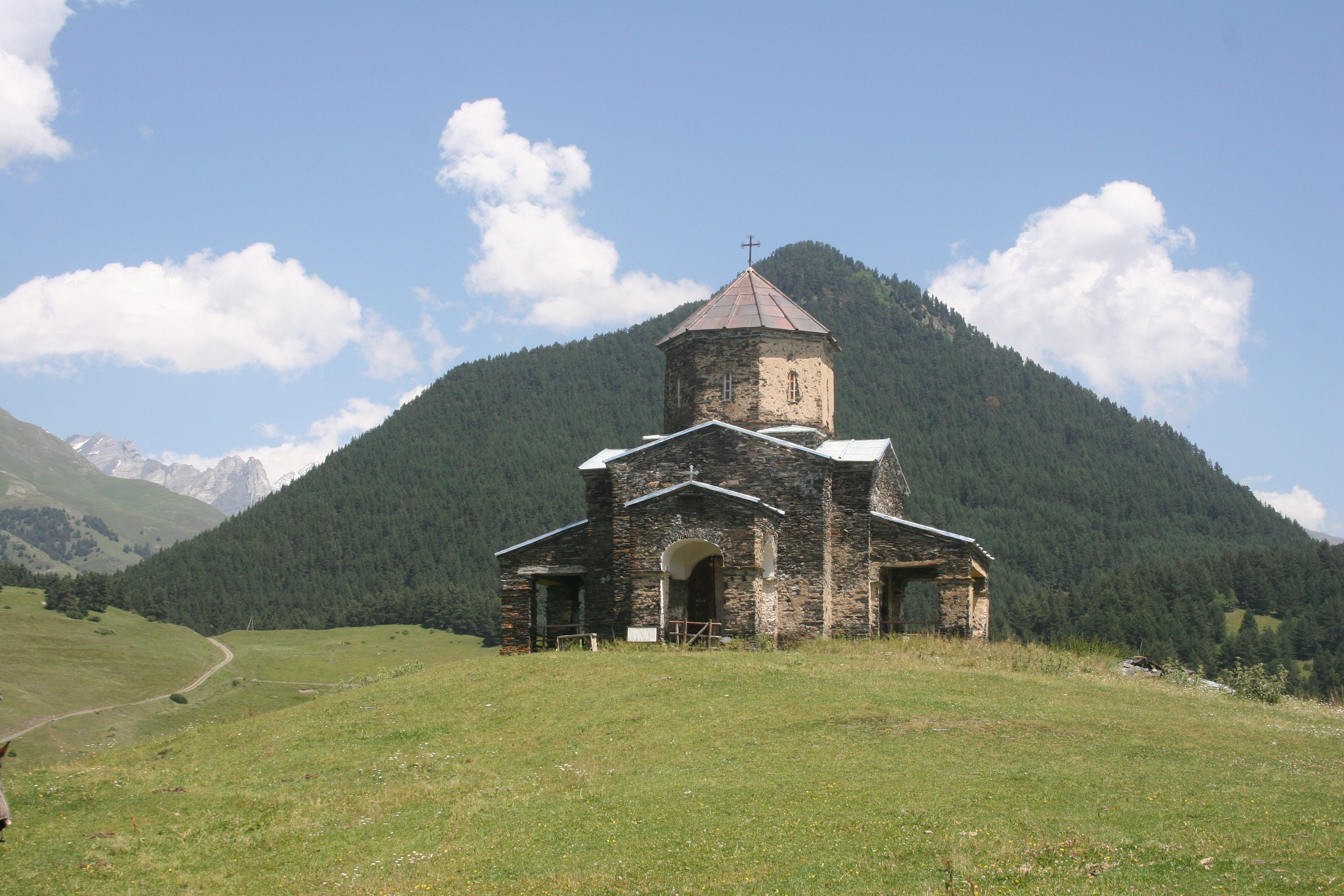

- Location in Georgia
- Coordinates: 42°22′19″N 45°39′45″E
- Country: Georgia
- Region: Kakheti
- Municipality: Akhmeta
- Elevation: 2,080 m (6,820 ft)

Population (2014)
  - Total: 4
- Time zone: UTC+4 (Georgian Time)

Shenako (Georgian: შენაქო, also spelled Shenak'o or Shenaqo) is a highland village in the eastern Georgian region of Kakheti.

Shenako located 2070 meters above sea level on the southern slope of the Greater Caucasus, in the historical-geographical area of Tusheti, some 100 km northeast of the municipal center of Akhmeta, close to the border with Dagestan, Russia.

Shenako is one of the few still populated villages in highland Tusheti, but is only accessible by land through a 4WD. The village is overlooked by Mount Diklo and contains a series of buildings of Georgian folk architecture and the old church of the Holy Trinity. Right behind this church there is one of the sanctuaries niche - a relic of pagan beliefs, which subsequently were adapted and became intertwined with Christianity.

== See also ==
- Kakheti
