= Omalo Ethnographic Museum =

- Tushetian Ethnographic Museum of Keselo, in Omalo
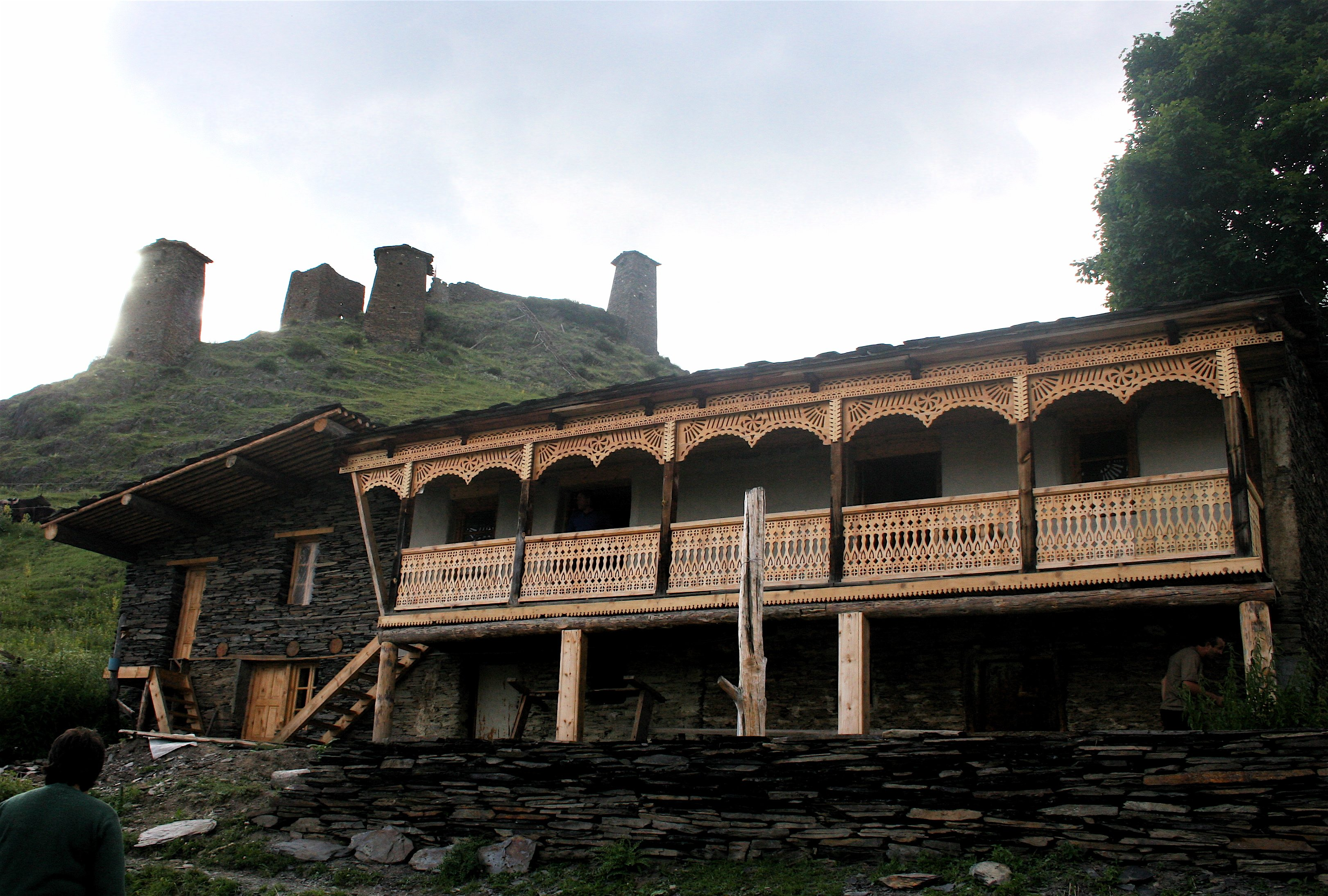
- Omalo Ethnographic Museum, facade
- Location: Tusheti, Georgia
- Coordinates: 42°22′44″N 45°37′48″E
- Type: ethnographic museum

The Omalo Ethnographic Museum is an ethnographic museum in the village of Zemo (Upper) Omalo in the Tusheti region of Georgia. The Tushetian Ethnographic Museum of Keselo preserves traditional items used by the Tusheti people, such as agricultural tools, household items and weapons. The Museum's exhibition is dedicated to showcasing local traditions and customs and portrays the way Tushetians used to live in the past. The exhibition also includes archeological findings, such as Bronze Age axes and jewelry. The nearby tourist trail also includes Keselo fortress.

== See also ==
- Tushetians
- Keselo
- Tusheti National Park
