= Tushetians =

Ethnic subgroup of Georgians

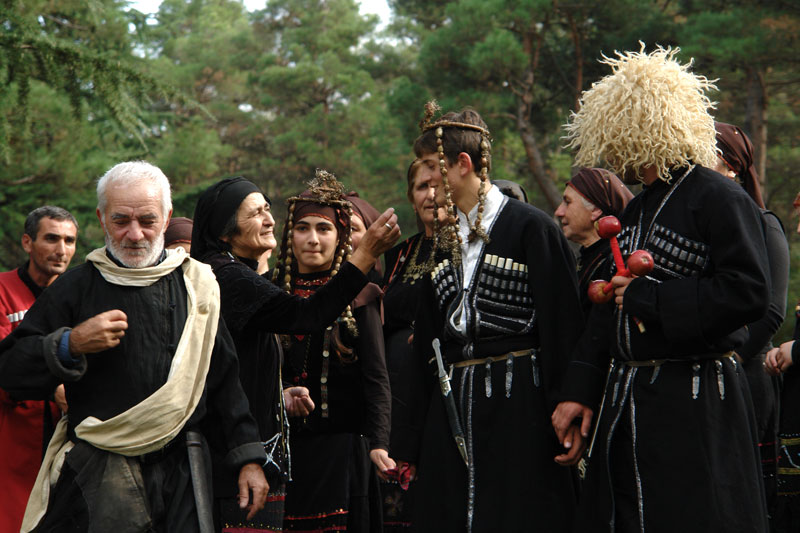
Tushetians, 2006

The Tushetians (/tuːˈʃɛtiənz/; Georgian: თუშები, romanized: tushebi), or Tush /ˈtuːʃ/, are a subgroup of Georgians who mainly live in Tusheti. Tsova Tushetians speak the Tsova Tushetian language and Chagma Tushetians speak the Chagma Tushetian dialect of Georgian.

== Subgroups ==
The Tush divide themselves into two groups, the Chagma-Tush, who speak the local Georgian dialect and the Tsova-Tush, also known as Bats or Batsbi, who speak the Bats language, a Nakh language. Most Bats also speak Georgian, to which there is a continuing trend of linguistic assimilation. Despite differences in language and culture (to a degree), both Chagma- and Tsova-Tush consider themselves to be part of the larger group of Tush, which in turn is considered a subgroup of Georgians.

== Culture ==
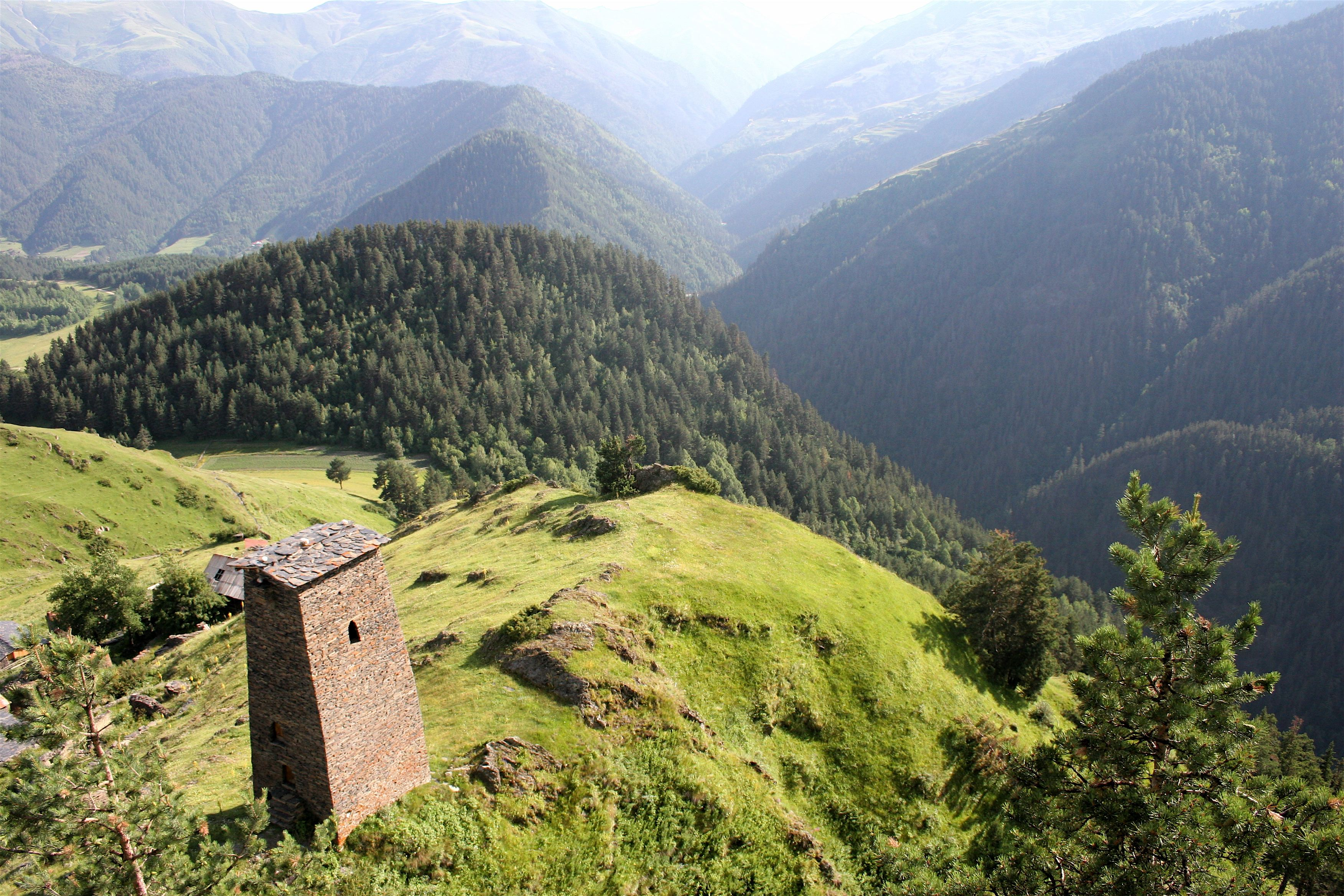
Keselo, Tusheti

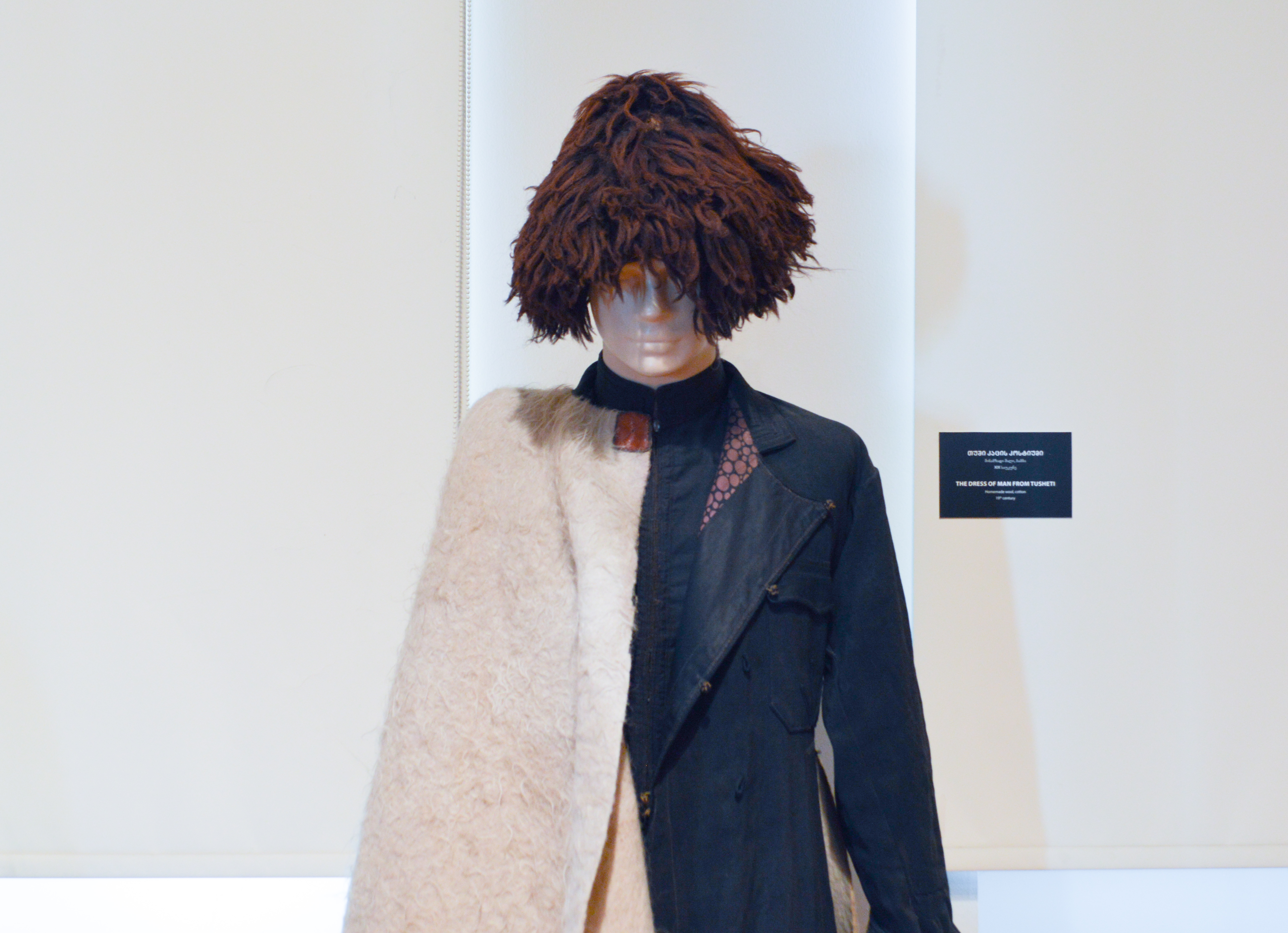
Costume of a Tush man.

Traditionally, the Tushetians are shepherds. Tushetian Guda cheese (Not to be confused with European Gouda cheese, with which it shares neither the features nor the making technique) and high quality wool was famous and was exported to Europe and Russia. Even today sheep and cattle breeding is the leading branch of the economy of highland Tusheti. The local shepherds spend the summer months in the highland areas of Tusheti but live in the lowland villages of Zemo Alvani and Kvemo Alvani in wintertime. Their customs and traditions are similar to those of other eastern Georgian mountaineers, such as the Khevsurs and Pshavs.

Like most Georgian groups, they are mainly Georgian Orthodox Christian in religion.

== Origins ==
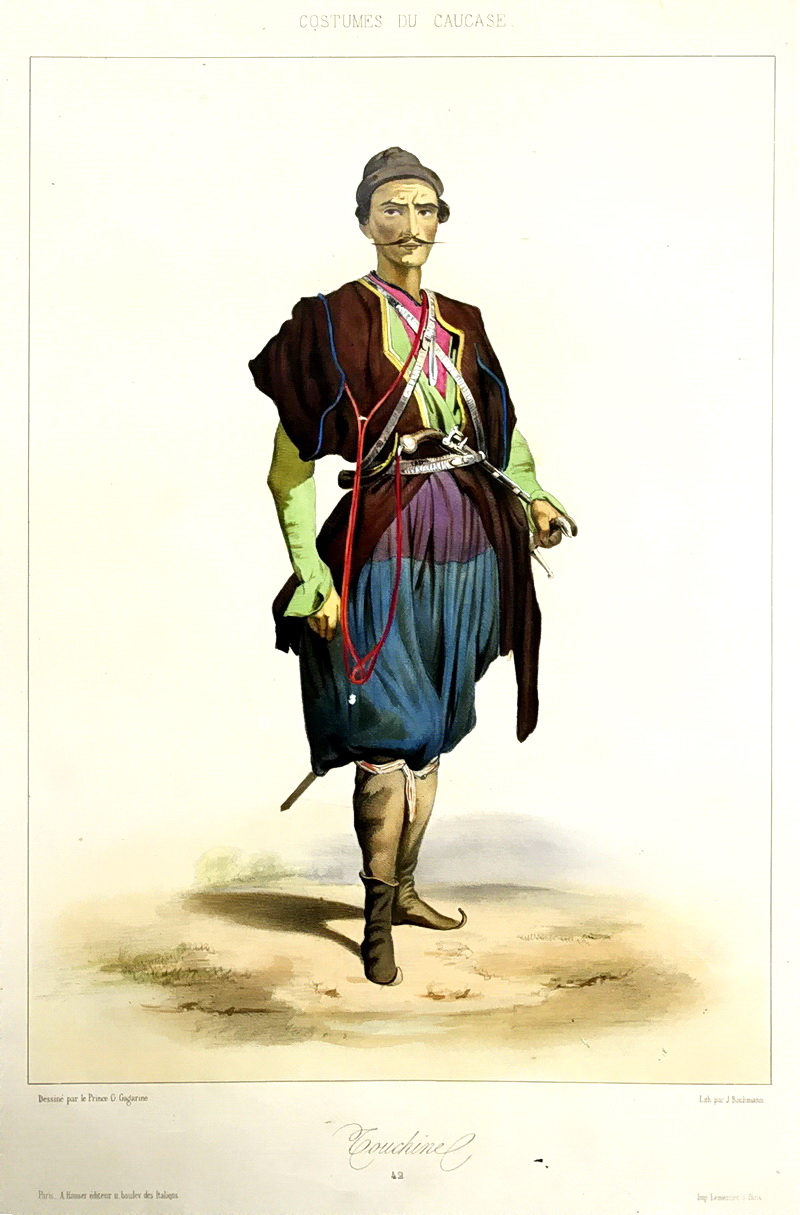
A Tushetian man by Grigory Gagarin, 1840s

The origin of the Tush themselves is a mysterious and debatable matter, with numerous theories regarding the origin of Tsova-Tush and of the Chagma-Tush. It also is uncertain whether the two groups have a common origin or not.

Theories regarding the origin of the Tsova-Tush include involving descent from South Caucasian Nakh tribes in ancient times (or a Nakh people inhabiting areas of Kakheti and Tusheti), North Caucasian Nakh tribes in the 16th century, or Old Georgian tribes who were influenced by or intermixed with the Nakh.

Anthropological studies on the Tsova-Tush found them to be somewhere in between the Chechen-origin Kists and the Chagma-Tush of the region, but significantly closer to the Chagma-Tush.

Theories regarding the origin of the Chagma-Tush all include descent from Georgian tribes (possibly pagans fleeing Christianization in the 4th century CE), but variously involve influence or admixture from South Caucasian Nakh, Dagestani peoples, or none.

== History ==
The region of Tusheti was first mentioned by its name in the 4th century BCE.

The lands of the Tush have variously been under the rule of Caucasian Iberia, the medieval united kingdom of Georgia, the Kingdom of Kakheti (which eventually fell under heavy influence from Persia), the Russian Empire, the Soviet Union and then independent united Georgia.

== See also ==
- Bats people
- Bats language
- Omalo Ethnographic Museum
