= Vainakh languages =

Dialect continuum consisting of Chechen and Ingush

Vainakh
- Geographic distribution: Central Caucasus
- Linguistic classification: Northeast Caucasian: Nakh; Vainakh
- Subdivisions: Chechen; Ingush

Language codes
- Glottolog: chec1244

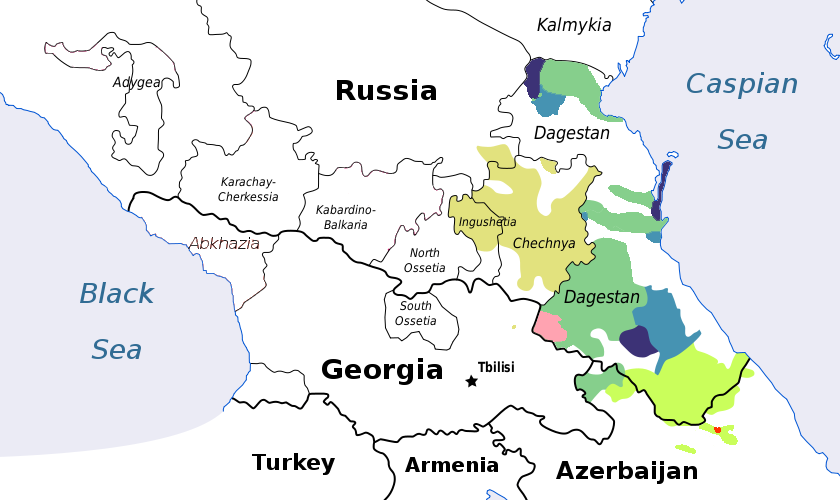
Approximate distribution of the branches of the Northeast Caucasian languages Nakh Avar-Andic Tsezic Dargin Lak Lezgic Khinalug

The Vainakh (also spelled Veinakh) languages are a dialect continuum that consists of the Chechen and Ingush languages, spoken mainly in the Russian republics of Chechnya and Ingushetia, as well as in the Chechen diaspora. Together with Bats, they form the Nakh branch of the Northeast Caucasian languages family.

== See also ==
- Languages of the Caucasus
- Northeast Caucasian languages
