= Tusheti =

Coordinates: 42°30′N 45°30′E

Tusheti თუშეთი
- Historical Region
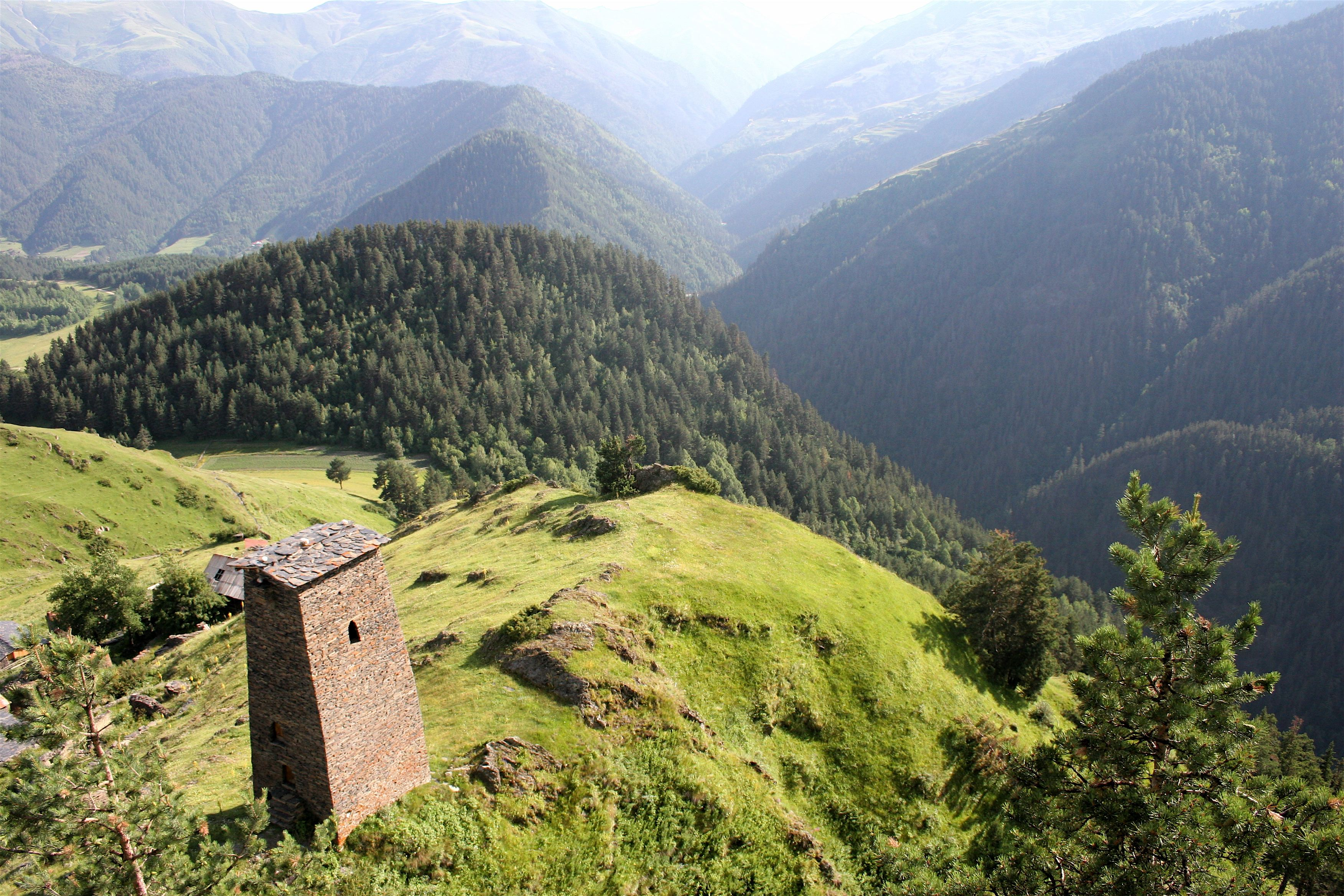
- Keselo

- Map highlighting the historical region of Tusheti in Georgia
- Country: Georgia
- Mkhare: Kakheti
- Capital: Omalo

Area
  - Total: 969 km^{2} (374 sq mi)

Tusheti (Georgian: თუშეთი, romanized: tusheti; Bats: თუშითა, romanized: tushita) is a historic region in northeast Georgia. A mountainous area, it is home to the Tusheti National Park. By the conventional definition of the Europe-Asia boundary as following the watershed of the Greater Caucasus, Tusheti is geographically a European part of Georgia.

== Geography ==
Located on the northern slopes of the Greater Caucasus Mountains, Tusheti is bordered by the Russian republics of Chechnya and Dagestan to the north and east, respectively; and by the Georgian historic provinces Kakheti and Pshav-Khevsureti to the south and west, respectively. The population of the area is mainly ethnic Georgians called Tushs or Tushetians (Georgian: tushebi).

Historically, Tusheti comprised four mountain communities: the Tsova (living in the Tsova Gorge), the Gometsari (living along the banks of the Tushetis Alazani River), the Pirikiti (living along the banks of the Pirikitis Alazani River), and the Chaghma (living close to the confluence of the two rivers). Administratively speaking, Tusheti is now part of the raioni of Akhmeta, itself part of Georgia's eastern region of Kakheti. The largest village in Tusheti is Omalo.

== History ==
The area is thought to have long been inhabited by the Tush, a subgroup of Georgians, which themselves divide into two groups – the Chaghma-Tush (Georgian name, used for Tush who speak the local Georgian dialect) and Tsova-Tush (Nakh-speaking Tush, better known as Bats or Batsbi).

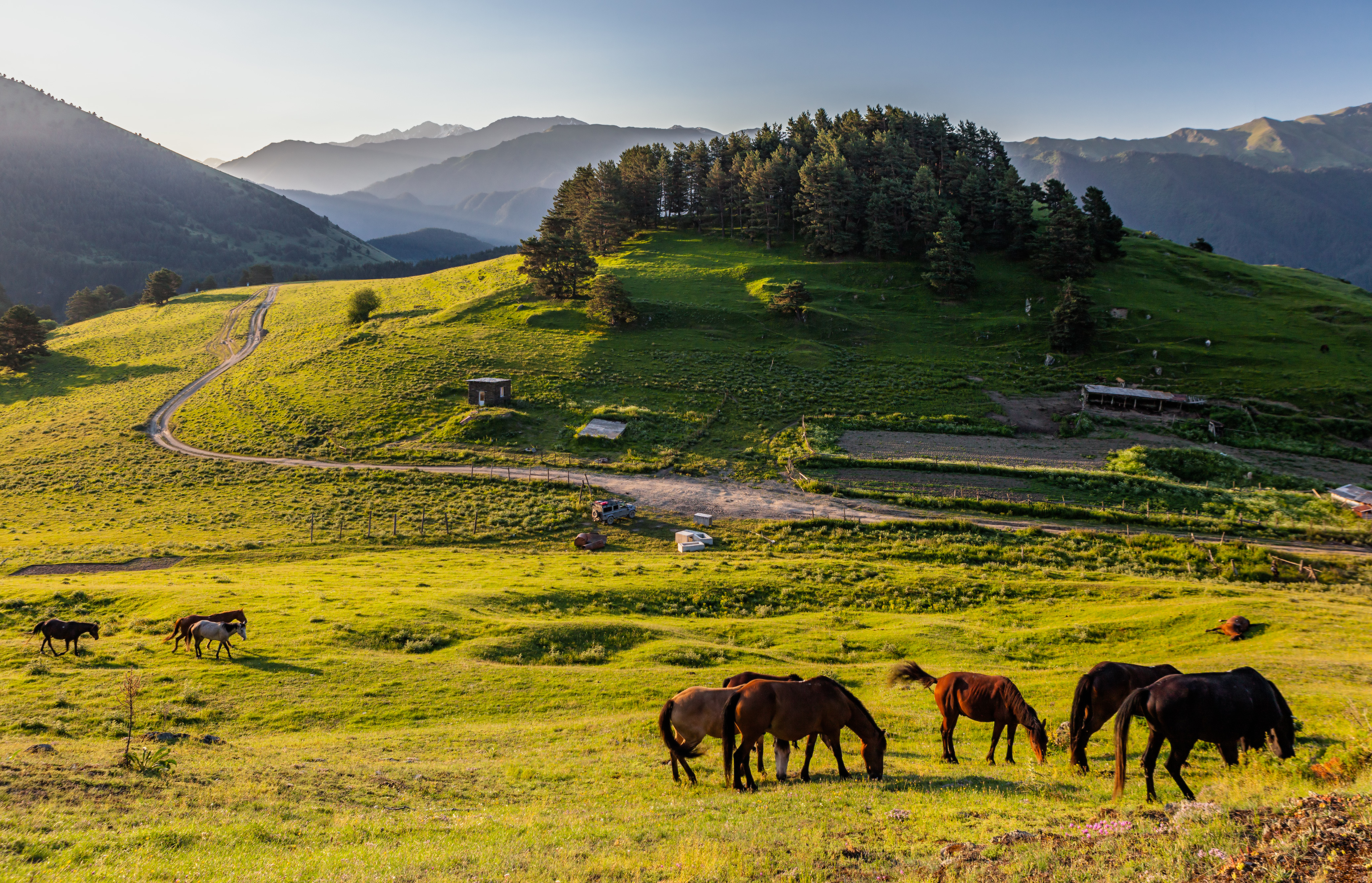
A morning scene near Omalo

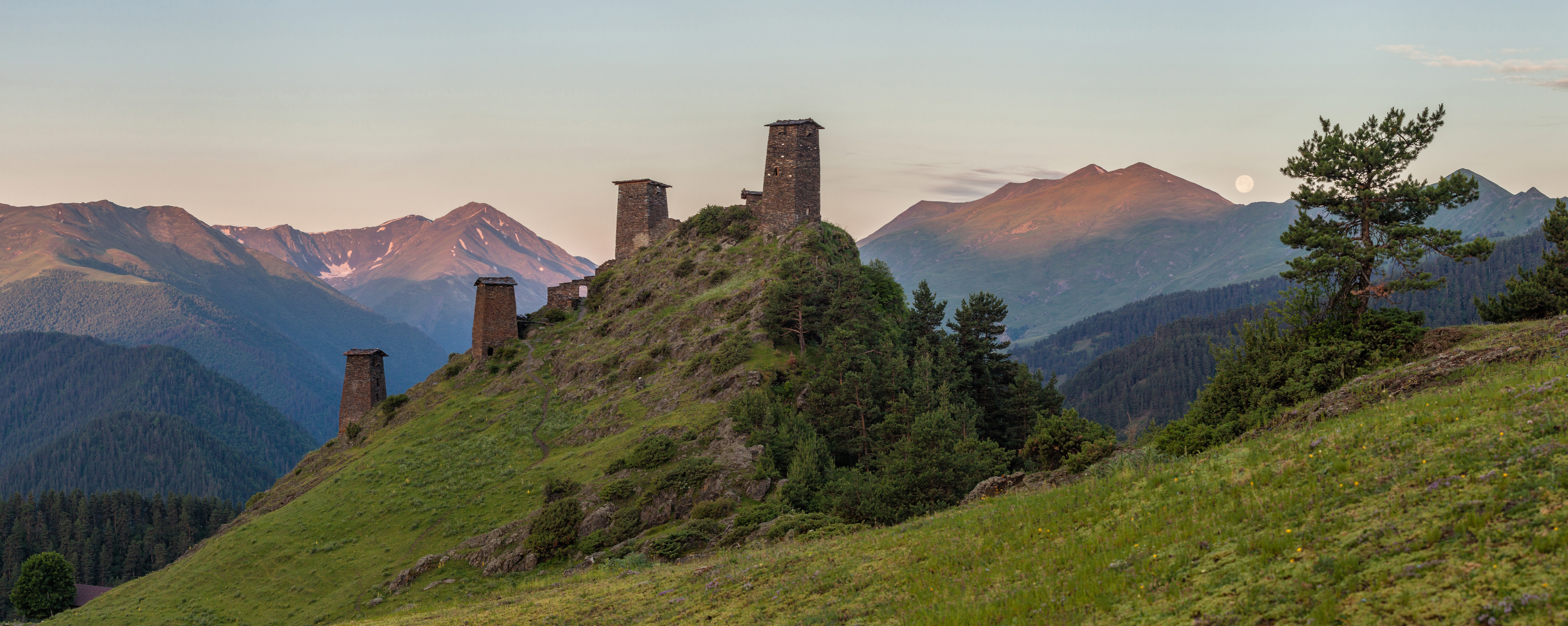
Moonrise over Keselo Fortress

Pagan Georgians from Pkhovi took refuge in the uninhabited mountains during their rebellion against Christianization implemented by the Iberian king Mirian III in the 330s. From the 5th century it became a constituent part of the Kingdom of Iberia. In the 8th century, together with the Khundzakhi community, it was included in one administrative unit – the Saeritavo (Duchy) of Tsuketi and this time is considered to be the Christianization period of Tushetians. In the 8th-9th centuries, when it was part of Kakheti, it was included in the Pankisi Saeristavo, and later, when it was part of the united Georgia – in the Kakheti Saeristavo.

In the second half of the 17th century, Tusheti came in King Erekle I (1642–1709) support in the fight for the kingdom. In 1659 during the Kakhetian uprising, the great contribution made by the Tushes in the battle of Bakhtrioni against the Tatar invaders became a basis on the legend about the bravery of the leader of Tushetians – Zezva Gafrindauli and the transfer of the Aloni(Alvani) Valley to the Tushes. The right to use the pastures of the Alvani Valley for the Tushes was subsequently legalized by the deeds of the kings of Kakheti – Teimuraz II and Erekle I.

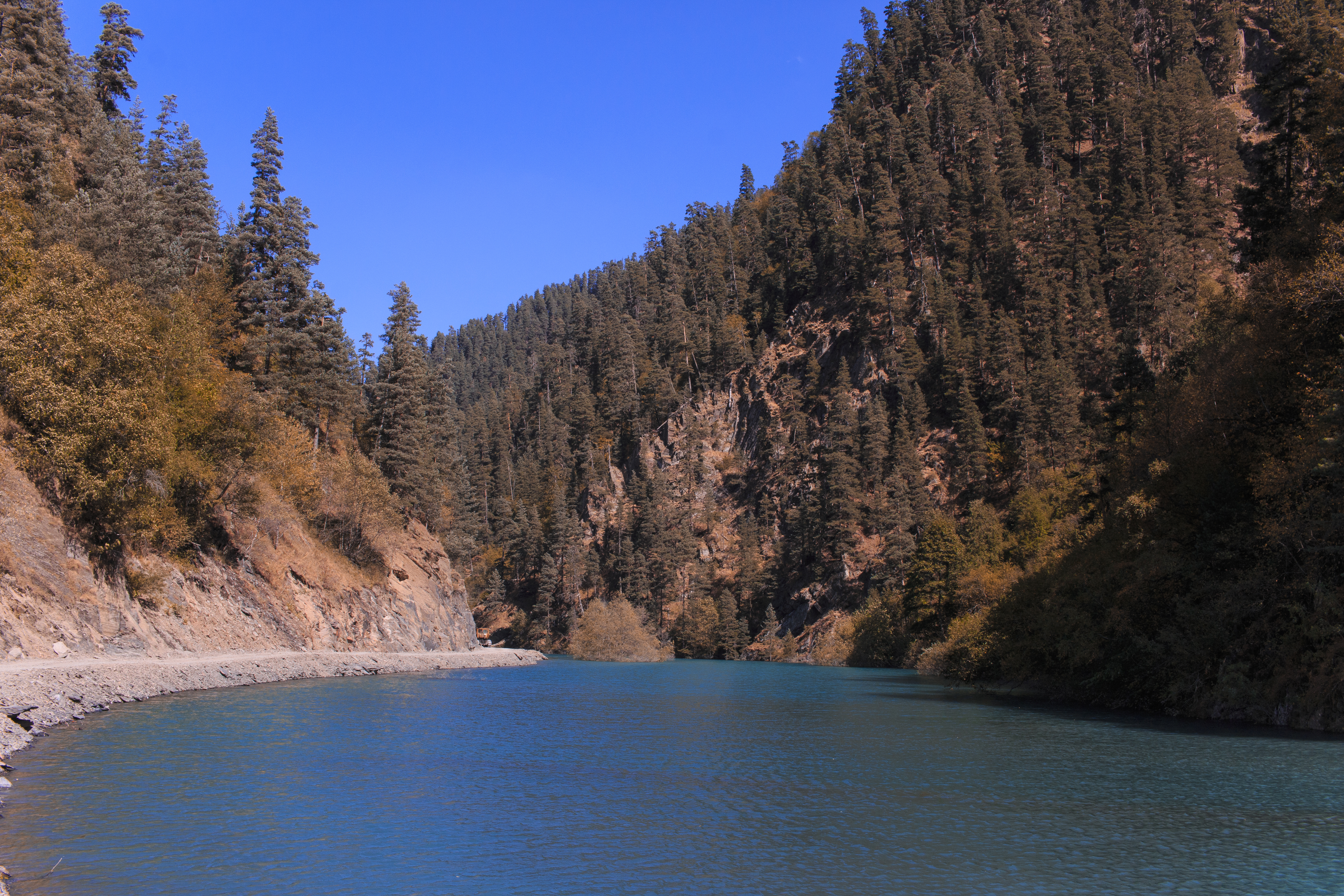
A small lake on the road to Tusheti

Regarding the relationship between the Nakh (Tsova) and Georgian (Chaghma) Tushians, the "Red Book", states the following:

For centuries there have been two communities next to each other in Tusheti, one speaking the Nakh language, the other Old Georgian. The general name for them is tush, according to their language either Tsova- or Chagma-Tushian. They formed one single material and intellectual unit with Old Georgian elements prevailing.

The descendants of the Old Georgian pagan tribes, whose ancestors had fled from Christianity to Tusheti, are regarded as Tushians. In the mountains some of the fugitives splintered off from other Old Georgian tribes. They were in close contact with the Nakh tribes which resulted in a new linguistic unit.

After the collapse of the unified Georgian monarchy, Tusheti came under the rule of Kakhetian kings in the fifteenth century.

Many Tush families began to move southwards from Tusheti during the first half of the nineteenth century and settled in the low-lying fields of Alvan at the western end of Kakheti.

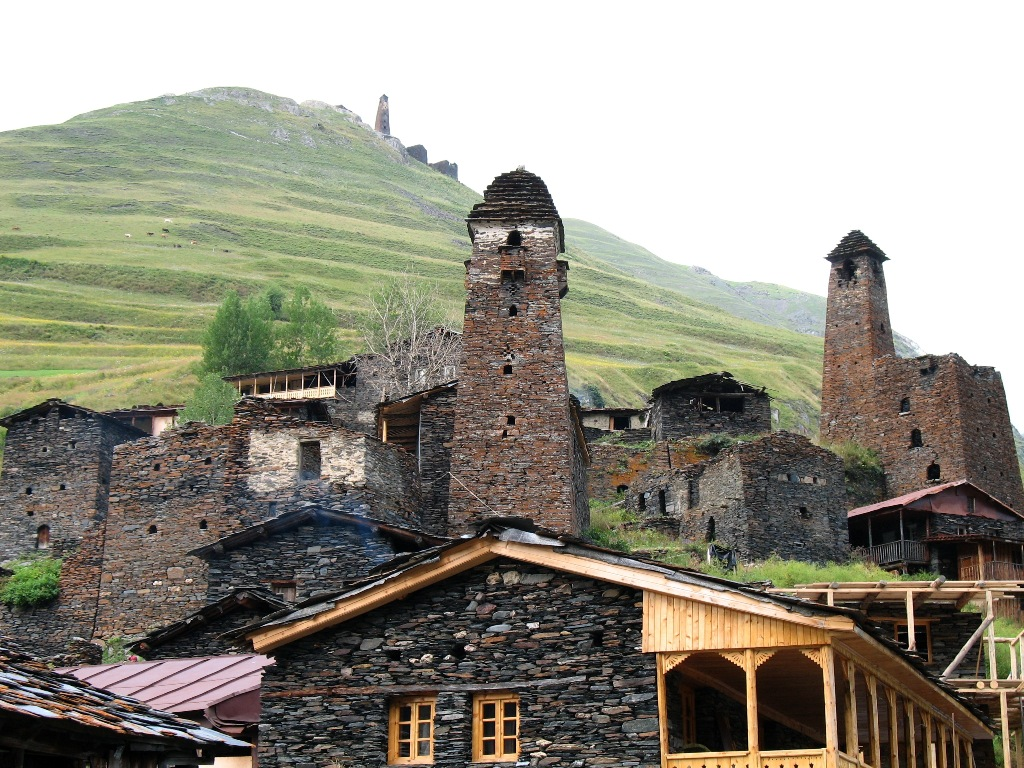
Watchtowers of Dartlo Village in Tusheti

Alvan had already belonged to the Tush as a wintering-ground for their flocks for centuries; it was bequeathed to them in the seventeenth century in recognition of their valuable assistance in defeating a Safavid army at the Battle of Bakhtrioni in 1659: Like a rushing stream did the Toushines make their way into the fortress, while the first rays of the rising sun were falling upon the grim old fortifications. The Tartars, half asleep, ran out into a field, but in vain for now they were met by the Pchaves and Khevsoures, who had ventured out from the gorge of Pankisse. The Tartars, surrounded on all sides, were exterminated to the last.

The first to move were the Bats people following the destruction of one of their most important villages by a landslide in c. 1830 and an outbreak of the plague. The Tush of the Chaghma, Pirikiti and Gometsari communities followed later. Many of these families practiced a semi-nomadic way of life, the men spending the summer with the flocks of sheep high up in the mountains between April and October, and wintering their flocks in Kakheti.

During the German invasion of the Soviet Union, a minor anti-Soviet revolt took place in the area in 1942-1943, seemingly linked to the similar but more large-scale events in the neighbouring Ingushetia.

== Culture ==
One of the most ecologically unspoiled regions in the Caucasus, Tusheti is a popular mountain trekking venue. Traditionally, the Tushs are sheep herders. Tushetian Guda cheese and high quality wool was famous and exported to various destinations. Even today sheep and cattle breeding is the leading branch of the economy of highland Tusheti. The local shepherds spend the summer months in the highland areas of Tusheti but live in the lowland villages of Zemo Alvani and Kvemo Alvani in wintertime. Their customs and traditions are similar to those of other eastern Georgian mountaineers (see Khevsureti), with some local nuances. Due to pre-Christian customs, pork is considered bad luck; farmers will not raise pigs and "some families shun pork altogether".

== Historical population figures ==
Figures from the Russian imperial census of 1873 given in Dr. Gustav Radde's Die Chews'uren und ihr Land — ein monographischer Versuch untersucht im Sommer 1876 (published by Cassel in 1878) divide the villages of Tusheti into eight communities:

- the Parsma community: 7 villages, 133 households, consisting of 290 men and 260 women, totalling 550 souls
- the Dartlo community: 6 villages, 143 households, consisting of 251 men and 275 women, totalling 526 souls
- the Omalo community: 7 villages, 143 households, consisting of 354 men and 362 women, totalling 716 souls
- the Natsikhvári community: 8 villages, 116 households, consisting of 282 men and 293 women, totalling 575 souls
- the Djvar-Boseli community: 10 villages, 116 households, consisting of 270 men and 295 women, totalling 565 souls
- the Indurta community: 1 village, 191 households, consisting of 413 men and 396 women, totalling 809 souls
- the Sagirta community: 3 villages, 153 households, consisting of 372 men and 345 women, totalling 717 souls
- the Iliúrta community: 8 villages, 136 households, consisting of 316 men and 329 women, totalling 645 souls

1873 TOTAL: 50 villages, 1,131 households, consisting of 2,548 men and 2,555 women, in all 5,103 souls.

Note: The Indurta and Sagirta communities were home to the Bats people.

== See also ==
- Kakheti
- Keselo
- Omalo
- Shenako
- Bochorna
- Tushetians
- Iase Tushi
- Tushetian horse

== Bibliography ==
- Старчевскій, А. В. (1891). Кавказскій Толмачъ [Caucasian Translator] (in Russian). СПб: Типографія И. Н. Скороходова. pp. 1–690.
