= Ingush language =

Northeast Caucasian language

Ingush
- Ghalghay, Ingus, Galgay, Kisti, Kistin
- гӀалгӀай мотт ghalghaj mott
- Pronunciation: [ˈʁəɫʁɑːɪ mʷɔtː]
- Native to: North Caucasus
- Region: Ingushetia, Chechnya, North Ossetia–Alania
- Ethnicity: Ingush
- Native speakers: 350,000 (2020)
- Language family: Northeast Caucasian: Nakh; Vainakh; Chechen–Ingush; Ingush
- Writing system: Cyrillic (current); Georgian, Arabic, Latin (historical)

Official status
- Official language in: Russia: Ingushetia

Language codes
- ISO 639-2: inh
- ISO 639-3: inh
- Glottolog: ingu1240
- Ingush

- Ingush is classified as Vulnerable by the UNESCO Atlas of the World's Languages in Danger

Ingush (/ˈɪŋɡʊʃ/; гӀалгӀай мотт, ġalġay mott, IPA: [ˈʁəɫʁɑːɪ mʷɔtː]) is a Northeast Caucasian language spoken by about 350,000 people, known as the Ingush, across a region covering the Russian republics of Ingushetia, Chechnya, North Ossetia, as well as the countries of Turkey, Kazakhstan, Jordan, Syria, Lebanon, and others.

== Classification ==
Ingush and Chechen, together with Bats, constitute the Nakh branch of the Northeast Caucasian language family. There is pervasive passive bilingualism between Ingush and Chechen.

== Dialects ==
Ingush is not divided into dialects with the exception of Galanc̈oz̈ (native name: Галай-ЧӀож/Галайн-ЧӀаж), which is considered to be transitional between Chechen and Ingush.

== Geographic distribution ==
Ingush is spoken by about 350,000-400,000 people (2020) in Russia, primarily in the North Caucasian republics of Ingushetia, North Ossetia and Chechnya. Speakers can also be found in Kazakhstan, Uzbekistan, Turkmenistan, Belgium, Norway, Turkey and Jordan.

=== Official status ===
Ingush is, alongside Russian, an official language of Ingushetia, a federal subject of Russia.

== Phonology ==
=== Vowels ===
	Front	Central	Back
High	и/i [ɪ]	varies [ɨ]	у/u [ʊ]
Mid	э/e [e]	varies [ə]	о/o [o]
Low	аь/ä [æ]		а/a [ɑː]

The diphthongs are иэ /ie/, уо /uo/, оа /oɑ/, ий /ij/, эи /ei/, ои /oi/, уи /ui/, ов /ow/, ув /uw/, and the schwa is mostly in unstressed syllables and ultra-short, marked with a breve in IPA.

=== Consonants ===
The consonants of Ingush are as follows, including the Latin orthography:

		Labial	Dental/ Alveolar	Palatal (-alveolar)	Velar		Uvular	Pharyngeal	Glottal
		Labial	Dental/ Alveolar	Palatal (-alveolar)	palatalized	plain	Uvular	Pharyngeal	Glottal
Nasal		m ⟨м, m⟩	n ⟨н, n⟩						
Plosive	voiceless	p ⟨п, p⟩	t ⟨т, t⟩	kʲ ⟨к, kj⟩		k ⟨к, k⟩	q ⟨кх, q⟩	ʡ ⟨Ӏ, ȟ⟩	ʔ ⟨ъ, ʼ⟩
Plosive	ejective	pʼ ⟨пӀ, pʼ⟩	tʼ ⟨тӀ, tʼ⟩	kʲʼ ⟨кӀ, kjʼ⟩		kʼ ⟨кӀ, kʼ⟩	qʼ ⟨къ, qʼ⟩		
Plosive	voiced	b ⟨б, b⟩	d ⟨д, d⟩	ɡʲ ⟨г, gj⟩		ɡ ⟨г, g⟩			
Affricate	voiceless		t͡s ⟨ц, c⟩	t͡ʃ ⟨ч, c̈⟩					
Affricate	ejective		t͡sʼ ⟨цӀ, cʼ⟩	t͡ʃʼ ⟨чӀ, c̈’⟩					
Fricative	voiceless	f ⟨ф, f⟩	s ⟨с, s⟩	ʃ ⟨ш, s̈⟩		x ⟨х, x⟩		ħ ⟨хь, ħ⟩	h ⟨хӀ, h⟩
Fricative	voiced	ʋ ⟨в, v⟩	z ⟨з, z⟩	ʒ ⟨ж, z̈⟩		ʁ ⟨гӀ, ğ⟩			
Approximant		ʋ ⟨в, v⟩	l ⟨л, l⟩	j ⟨й, j⟩					
Trill	voiceless		r̥ ⟨рхӀ, ř⟩						
Trill	voiced		r ⟨р, r⟩						

Single consonants can be geminated by various morphophonemic processes.

== Writing system ==
It is possible that during the period of the 8–12th centuries, when churches like Tkhaba-Yerdy emerged in Ingushetia, a writing system based on a Georgian script emerged. This is attested by the fact that a non-Georgian name, 'Enola', was found written on the arc of Tkhaba-Yerdy. Furthermore, Georgian text was found on archaeological items in Ingushetia that could not be deciphered.

It is impossible to pinpoint the precise date at when Arabic writing entered the territory of Chechnya and Ingushetia. One thing is certain: both the Arabic language and writing emerged among the Chechens and Ingush in connection with the spread of Islam. Consequently, Arabic writing appeared in Chechnya no earlier than the second half of the 17th century, and in Ingushetia even later. Already during Imam Shamil's reign, mullahs from among the local population appeared in Chechnya, teaching the Chechen children Arabic literacy; that is, how to read the foreign language of Arabic mechanically, as well as reciting Arabic prayers. Imam Shamil was not supportive of establishing a written language (similar to Persian and Ottoman Turkish) for the languages of the peoples of the Caucasus. He and the clergy tried to introduce the Arabic language and script, but this was unsuccessful because the people did not understand it. Written communication, all official and private correspondence in the part of Chechnya subordinated to Shamil, was conducted in Arabic, while in the part of Chechnya that was part of Russia, official correspondence was conducted in Russian, and private correspondence was conducted in both Russian and Arabic. However, from mid to late 19th century, parallel with efforts with Avar language, Chechnya and Ingushetia also saw the start of using Arabic for the first time for their orthography.

Ingush became a written language with an Arabic-based writing system at the beginning of the 20th century. In those eras, and in the letters written by native Ingush speakers, certain unique letters seem to have been in use:

Arabic Ingush letters
Arabic letters	څ	چ	ژ	ڕ	ڥ	ڢ	ڨ	ڭ	ڮ
Cyrillic equivalents	ч	чI	цI	ц	пI	п	кх	кI	г

After the October Revolution, in the 1920s, simultaneous with Chechen, Circassian, and Turkic languages of the USSR, there was a process of standardizing and indigenizing the already-utilized Arabic script for each of these languages. By the late 1920s, with a change in Soviet policy, an adaptation of Latin alphabet was taken up. In July 1938, a new Cyrillic script was announced for both Ingush and Chechen, and this script remains in use to this day.

Modern Ingush Cyrillic
А а	Аь аь	Б б	В в	Г г	ГӀ гӀ	Д д	Е е
Ё ё	Ж ж	З з	И и	Й й	К к	Кх кх	Къ къ
КӀ кӀ	Л л	М м	Н н	О о	П п	ПӀ пӀ	Р р
С с	Т т	ТӀ тӀ	У у	Ф ф	Х х	Хь хь	ХӀ хӀ
Ц ц	ЦӀ цӀ	Ч ч	ЧӀ чӀ	Ш ш	Щ щ	Ъ ъ	Ы ы
Ь ь	Э э	Ю ю	Я я	Яь яь	Ӏ ӏ		

Lower-case palochka, ⟨ӏ⟩, is found in handwriting. Usually, palochka uppercase and lowercase forms consistent in print or upright, but only upper-case ⟨Ӏ⟩ is normally used in computers.

== Grammar ==
Ingush is a nominative–accusative language in its syntax, though it has ergative morphology.

=== Case ===
The most recent and in-depth analysis of the language shows eight cases: absolutive, ergative, genitive, dative, allative, instrumental, lative and comparative.

Cases	Singular	Plural
Absolutive	-⌀	-azh / -ii, -i (Note: The choice of -azh vs. -ii is lexically determined for the nominative, but other cases are predictable.)
Ergative	-uo / -z, -aa (Note: -uo is the only productive form. -z appears with personal names, kin terms, and other nouns referring to humans. -aa occurs with some declensions and is increasingly unproductive in colloquial use.)	–azh
Genitive	-a, -n (Note: Allomorph after vowels)	-ii, -i
Dative	-aa, -na	-azh-ta
Allative	-ga	-azh-ka
Instrumental	-ca	-azh-ca
Lative	-gh	-egh
Comparative	-l	-el

=== Tenses ===
Stem	Suffix	Tense	Example
Infinitive Stem (INFS)	{-a}	Infinitive (INF)	laaca
Infinitive Stem (INFS)	{-a}	Imperative (IMP)	laaca
Present Stem (unmarked)	---	Generic Present (PRES)	loac
Present Stem (unmarked)	{-az&}	Simultaneous Converb (SCV)	loacaz&
Present Stem (unmarked)	{-ar}	Imperfect (IMPF)	loacar
Present Stem (unmarked)	{-agDa}	Future (FUT)	loacadda
Past Stem (PAST)	{-ar}	Witnessed Past (WIT)	leacar
Past Stem (PAST)	{-aa}/{-na}	Anterior Converb (ACV)	leacaa
Past Stem (PAST)	{-aa} + {-D} / {-na} + {-D}	Perfect (PERF)	leacaad
Past Stem (PAST)	{-aa} + {-Dar} / {-na} + {-Dar}	Pluperfect (PLUP)	leacaadar

=== Numerals ===
Like many Northeast Caucasian languages, Ingush uses a vigesimal system, where numbers lower than twenty are counted as in a base-ten system, but higher decads are base-twenty.

Orthography	Phonetic	Value	Composition
cwa	[t͡sʕʌ]	1	
shi	[ʃɪ]	2	
qo	[qo]	3	
d.i'^{1}	[dɪʔ]	4	
pxi	[pxɪ]	5	
jaalx	[jalx]	6	
vorh	[vʷor̥]	7	
baarh	[bar̥]	8	
iis	[is]	9	
itt	[itː]	10	
cwaitt	[t͡sʕɛtː]	11	1+10
shiitt	[ʃitː]	12	2+10
qoitt	[qoitː]	13	3+10
d.iitt^{1}	[ditː]	14	4+10
pxiitt	[pxitː]	15	5+10
jalxett	[jʌlxɛtː]	16	6+10
vuriit	[vʷʊritː]	17	7+10
bareitt	[bʌreitː]	18	8+10
tq'iesta	[tqʼiːestə̆]	19	
tq'o	[tqʼo]	20	
tq'ea itt	[tqʼɛ̯æjitː]	30	20+10
shouztq'a	[ʃouztqʼə̆]	40	2×20
shouztq'aj itt	[ʃouztqʼetː]	50	2×20+10
bwea	[bʕɛ̯æ]	100	
shi bwea	[ʃɪ bʕɛ̯æ]	200	2×100
ezar	[ɛzər]	1000	loan from Persian

1. Note that "four" and its derivatives begin with noun-class marker. d- is merely the default value.

=== Pronouns ===
	1st person			2nd person		3rd person	
	singular	plural		singular	plural	singular	plural
	singular	exclusive	inclusive	singular	plural	singular	plural
Nominative	so	txo	vai	hwo	sho/shu	yz	yzh
Genitive	sy	txy	vai	hwa	shyn	cyn/cun	caar
Dative	suona	txuona	vaina	hwuona	shoana	cynna	caana
Ergative	aaz	oaxa	vai	wa	oasha	cuo	caar
Allative	suoga	txuoga	vaiga	hwuoga	shuoga	cynga	caarga
Ablative	suogara	txuogara	vaigara	hwuogara	shuogara	cyngara	caargara
Instrumental	suoca(a)	txuoca(a)	vaica(a)	hwuoca	shuoca(a)	cynca	caarca(a)
Lative	sogh	txogh	vaigh	hwogh	shogh	cogh	caaregh
Comparative	sol	txol	vail	hwol	shol	cul/cyl	caarel

=== Word order ===
In Ingush, "for main clauses, other than episode-initial and other all-new ones, verb-second order is most common. The verb, or the finite part of a compound verb or analytic tense form (i.e. the light verb or the auxiliary), follows the first word or phrase in the clause".

Muusaa vy hwuona telefon jettazh
Musa V.PROG 2S.DAT telephone strike.CVsim
It's Musa on the phone for you. (After answering the phone.)

== Bibliography ==
=== English sources ===
- Handel, Zev (2003). "Ingush inflectional verb morphology: a synchronic classification and historical analysis with comparison to Chechen" ( (PDF)). Current Trends in Caucasian, East European and Inner Asian Linguistics. pp. 123–175. doi:10.1075/cilt.246.11han. Archived from the original on Feb 1, 2017.
- Nichols, Johanna; Sprouse, Ronald L. (2004). Ingush-English and English-Ingush Dictionary. Routledge.
- Nichols, Johanna (2008). "Case in Ingush syntax". Case and Grammatical Relations. Typological Studies in Language. Vol. 81. John Benjamins Publishing Company. pp. 57–74. doi:10.1075/tsl.81.04nic. ISBN 978-90-272-2994-6.
- Nichols, Johanna (2011-03-15). Ingush Grammar (PDF). Berkeley, California; Los Angeles; London: University of California Press. pp. 1–806.

=== Russian sources ===
- Chentieva, Maryam (1958). Oshaev, Khalid (ed.). История Чечено-Ингушской письменности [The History of Checheno-Ingush writing] (in Russian). Grozny: Checheno-Ingush Book Publishing House. pp. 1–86.
- Dudarov, Abdul-Mazhit (2017). Akieva, Petimat (ed.). История эволюции ингушского письма [History of the evolution of Ingush writing] (PDF) (in Russian). Nazran: Kep. pp. 1–224. ISBN 978-5-4482-0015-1.
- Koryakov, Yuriy (2006). "Реестр Кавказских языков" [Register of Caucasian languages] (PDF). Атлас кавказских языков [Atlas of Caucasian languages] (PDF) (in Russian). Moscow: Piligrim. pp. 21–41. ISBN 5-9900772-1-1.
