= Tushetian horse =

Georgian horse breed

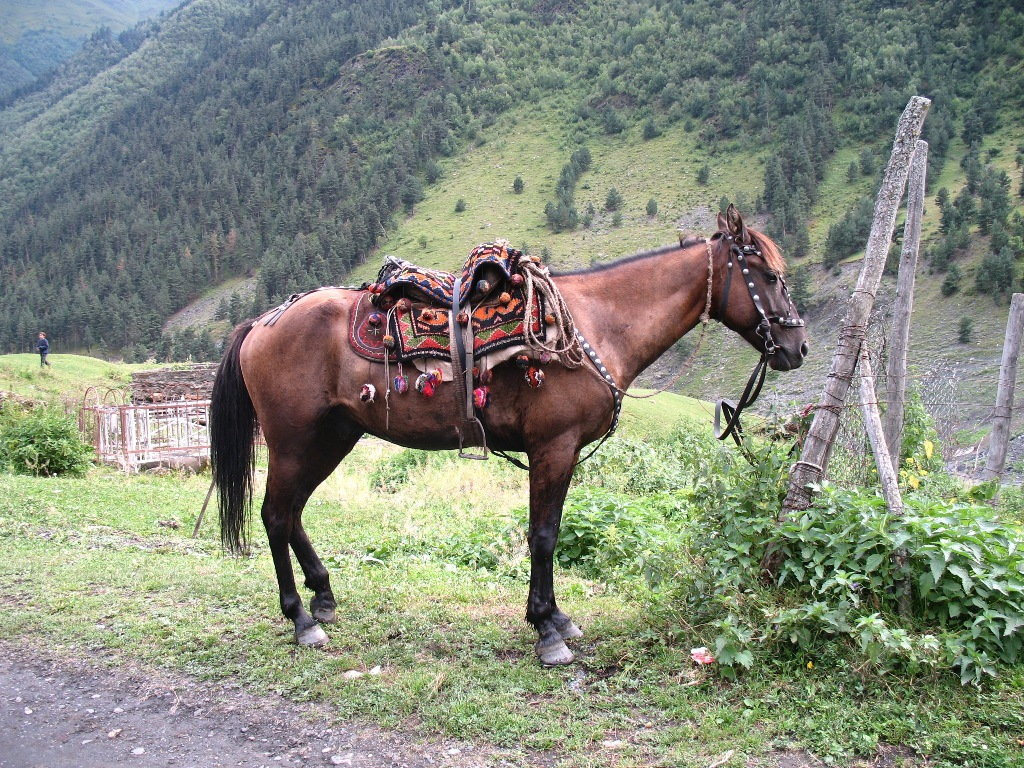
- Tushetian horse in Tusheti
- Use: Working equitation

Traits
- Height: From 1,34 m to 1,45 m
- Color: Bay, chestnut, and gray

The Tushetian (Georgian: თუშური ცხენი) is a breed of small saddle horses native to Tusheti, Georgia. It is probably the result of ancient selection, marked by harsh environmental conditions, under the influence of Arabian and Turkoman horses. Small in size, the Tushetian is known for its resistance, its adaptation to its mountainous region, and its ability to move at the amble gait. Historically, they were mainly ridden for farm work with sheep, and coveted for off-road mountain transport. A rare breed, it is very local and could be threatened with extinction. Protection measures have been recommended in order to preserve it, notably because of its genetic heritage.

== Denomination ==
The name of the Tushetian horse is transcribed თუშური ცხენი (Tushuri / Tushuri Cxeni) in Georgian, which literally means "from the region of Tusheti". The name is transcribed as Tushinskaya in Russian, and Ninca de Spengler translated it in 1997 as Touchine in French. In English there are different names: Tushetian, Tush, Tushin, Tusheti, or even Tushetianan.

== History ==
The Tushetian is one of two horse breeds identified in Georgia, and it is one of the oldest horses in the Caucasus. Its ancestors, known as the "Old Georgian Breed", appear to have been present in the region as early as the 1st and 3rd centuries. In addition to natural selection due to environmental and climatic conditions, they were influenced by the oriental horse, and in particular by horses from Turkmenistan, Turkey, Iran and the Arabian horse. The breed is used in military combat by the inhabitants of Tusheti. It has spread to all the sheep-breeding regions of Georgia, due to its use by agricultural horse riders. Recent crossbreeding with the Thoroughbred and the Kabardin has resulted in a loss of adaptability, and these crossbreeds have been discontinued. In 1976, the number of registered horses was very low, at around a thousand.

== Description ==
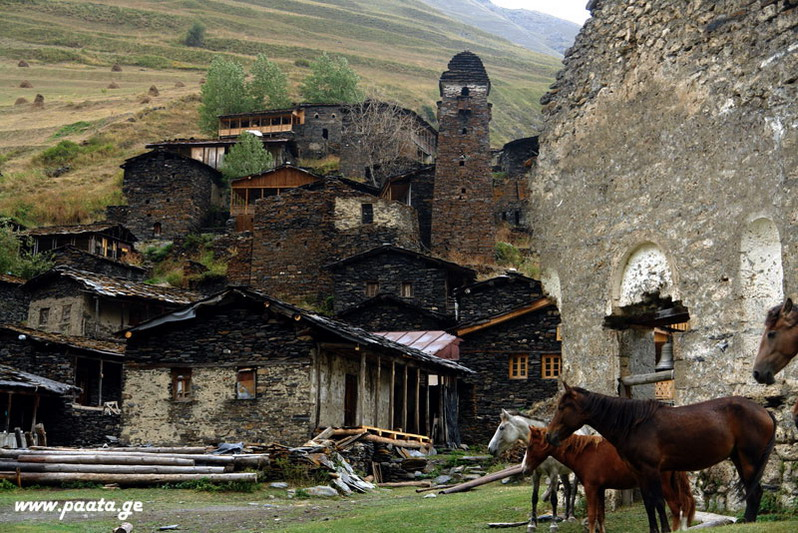
Tushetian horses in Dartlo.

A genetic characterization study published in 2017 shows that the Tushetian is the most specific of Georgian horses. It presents the type of the oriental horse and the mountain horse, being a fine, rather compact and lean animal, with an elongated and shallow body. The DAD-IS database classifies it as a "light pony", with an average height of 1.34 m. The CAB International study gives a range of 1.34 m to 1.42 m, with the University of Oklahoma study specifying a maximum of 1.45 m. L. A. Tortladze (Georgia Agricultural University) and Guide Delachaux give an average of 1.34 m for mares and 1.36 m for males. Horses bred in good conditions are taller and more developed.

The head, with its straight profile, is light and broad between the eyes (medium size), topped by short ears. The neck is straight and short or of medium length, set rather low. The withers are long and moderately prominent. The thorax may be broad or narrower, but deep. The shoulder is long and sloping. The back is short and straight, the croup short and moderately sloping. The legs are slender, with clean sinews and often closed hocks. The hooves are small, solid and black-horned. Mane and tail are well furnished.

Rather late, the Tushetian reaches maturity at around 5 or 6 years of age. Mares have good fertility, estimated at 65-70 %. Tushetian horses are very long-lived, still working at the age of 20 or even 25.

=== Coat ===
The coat is generally dark in color. According to Hendricks (University of Oklahoma), the most common is bay, followed by chestnut, gray, and black. However, L. A. Tortladze cites chestnut as the most common (45%), followed by gray (28%).

Pinto and leopard complex coats are rare, but possible. White markings are rare overall.

=== Temperament and gait ===
With a reputation for calmness and obedience, these horses are well suited to the harsh working conditions at altitude, with a strong capacity to store fat reserves during the summer in order to survive the winter months. Its sense of wayfinding is combined with sure-footedness. Furthermore, it is described as courageous and enduring.

The breed is reputed to have an additional gait, the amble, often much sought after by breeders and horse riders for the comfort it provides in the saddle. According to Hendricks, the amble is preferred to the trot, which is notoriously uncomfortable for these horses. L. A. Tortladze, on the other hand, believes that these horses have good trot and gallop qualities; measurements of speed over 1 000 m give an average of 1 min 327.

The Tushetian was the subject of a study to determine the presence of the DMRT3 gene mutation responsible for the extra gaits (and therefore the amble): this study did not confirm the presence or absence of extra gaits in the Tushetian, but it did confirm the existence of the genetic mutation responsible for them in the breed.

== Usage ==
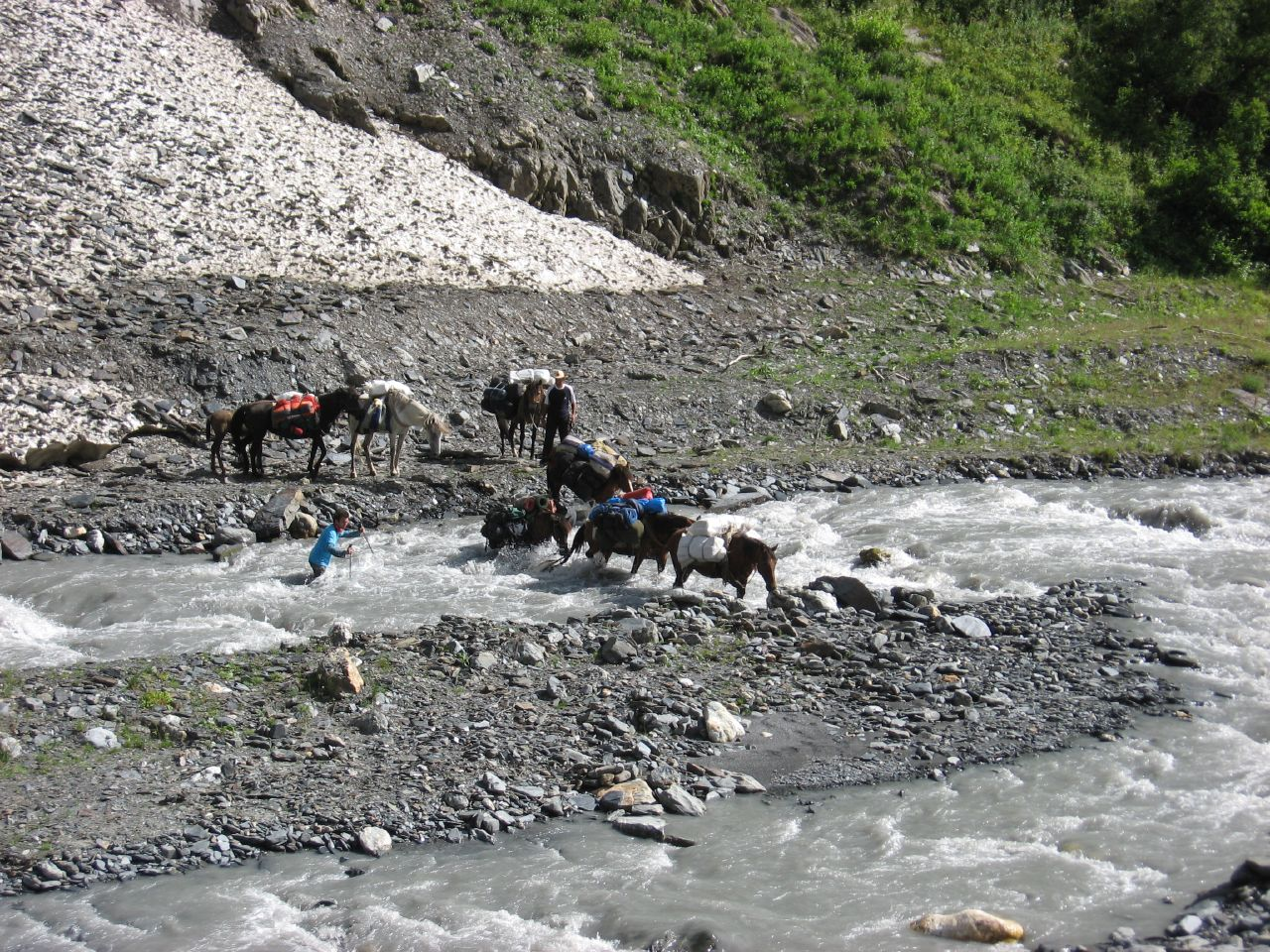
Packhorse in Tusheti

Usually put to moderate work from the age of 3, the Tushetian is used as a saddle horse, particularly for working equitation. Local breeders, nomadic pastoralists, ride them to maneuver their sheep from one grazing area to another in the mountains, depending on the season. Thanks to its sure-footedness, the breed is highly appreciated locally. These horses continue (2014) to be used as packhorses to transport goods, including cheese, around the region. They also participate in the annual transhumance, when the animals and their keepers come down from the mountains for the winter. The absence of roads favors the use of horses for mountain travel. Horse races are organized in the region, but the traditional way of life and the entertainment associated with it are in decline.

While most mares provide milk, others have also served as a military horse. It is well-suited to equestrian tourism, and the protected areas of Tusheti are open to equestrian tourism.

== Breeding distribution ==
The horse is bred in Tusheti, eastern Georgia, in the mountainous areas of the Caucasus, mainly as a purebred. A census carried out in 1990 revealed the presence of 1,496 individuals of the breed throughout the USSR. According to the Guide Delachaux, breeding has remained fairly stable since then, but Tortladze reports a decline in equine breeding practices, and with them in the number of animals, technical know-how and associated equipment.

The University of Oklahoma study (2007) considers the Tushetian to be rare. It is in danger of extinction in Georgia. Its genetic interest as an ancient local breed has been highlighted. It has been reported to contribute to the biological diversity of the Black Sea basin.

== See also ==
- List of horse breeds
- Tusheti

== Bibliography ==
- Bobilev, Igor (1977). Le grand livre du cheval en Russie (in French). Translated by De Spengler, Nina. La bibliothèque des Arts. p. 204.
- Chubinidze, A.; Gugushvili, J.; Barbakadze, T.; Gioirgobiani, T.; Gigitashvili, G. (2002). Growth and Physical Development of Tushuri Growing Horses. Proceedings of the Georgian State Zooveterinary Academy.
- Hendricks, Bonnie Lou (2007). International Encyclopedia of Horse Breeds (2nd ed.). University of Oklahoma Press. ISBN 978-0-8061-3884-8. OCLC 154690199.
- მაზმანიანი, შორენა (2017). Საქართველოს რეგიონებში გავრცელებული ცხენების პოპულაციურ გენეტიკური კვლევა [Horse populations distributed throughout Georgia - Genetic research] (PDF) (in Georgian). 2017: ილიას სახელმწიფო უნივერსიტეტი.
- Porter, Valerie; Alderson, Lawrence; Hall, Stephen J. G.; Sponenberg, Dan Phillip (2016). Mason's World Encyclopedia of Livestock Breeds and Breeding (6th ed.). CAB International. ISBN 978-1-84593-466-8. OCLC 948839453.
- Rousseau, Élise (2016). Guide des chevaux d'Europe (in French). Delachaux et Niestlé. ISBN 978-2-603-02437-9.
- Tortladze, L. А. (2014). The diversity of georgian local agriculture animals. Vol. 12. Annals of agrarian science.
