= Diklosmta =

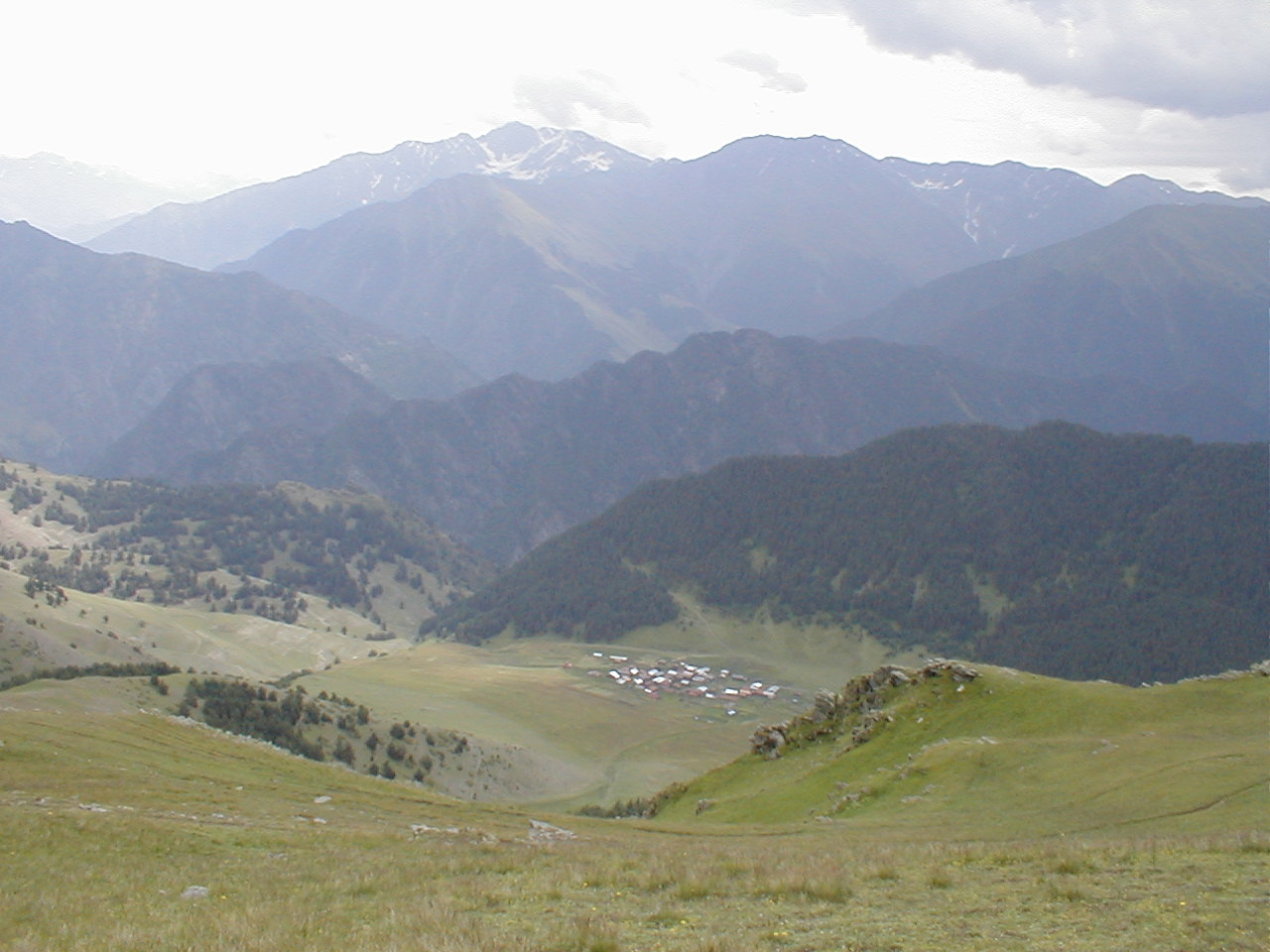

Highest point
- Elevation: 4,285 m (14,058 ft)
- Prominence: 1,263 m (4,144 ft)
- Isolation: 38.71 km (24.05 mi)
- Coordinates: 42°29′32″N 45°46′51″E

Geography
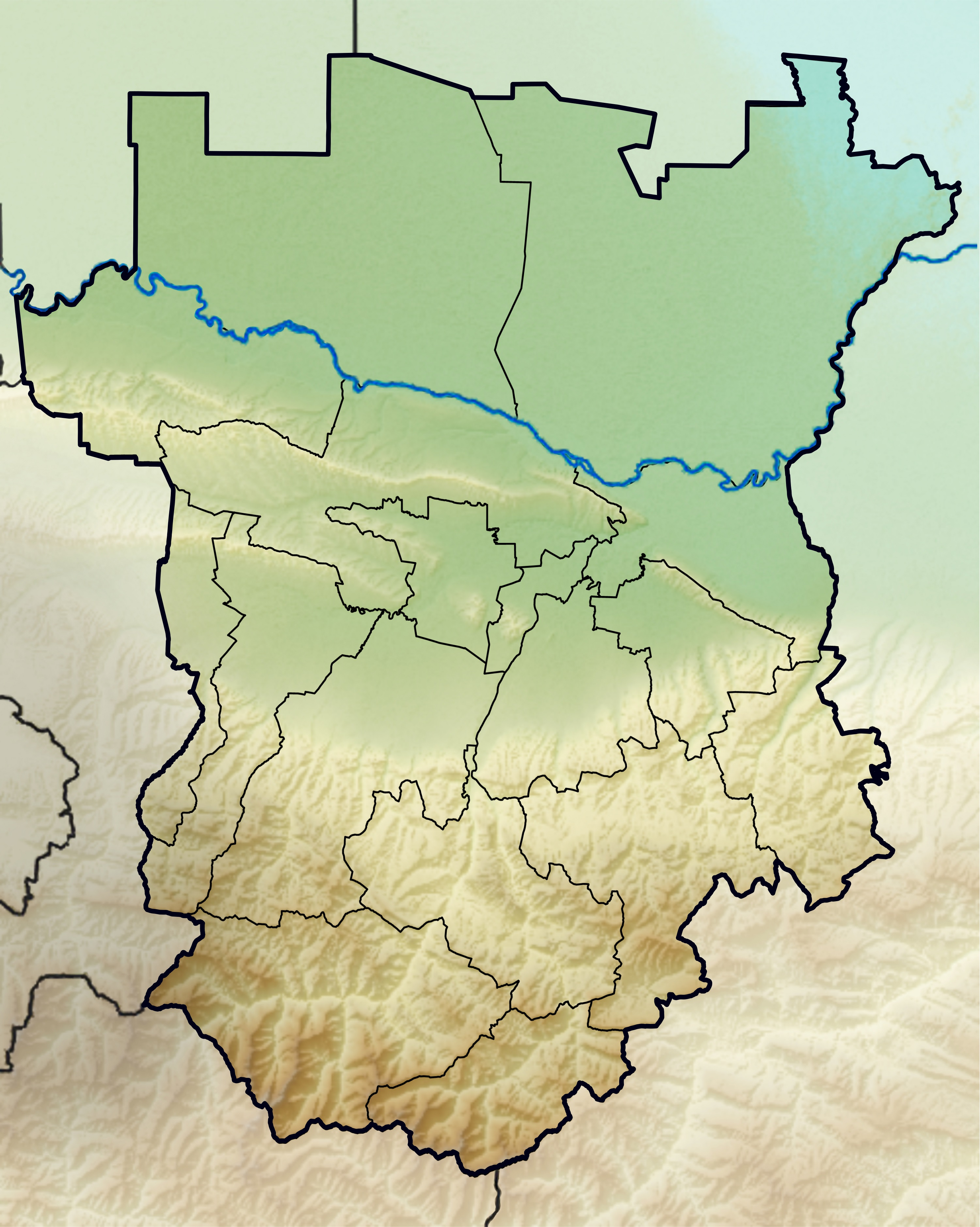
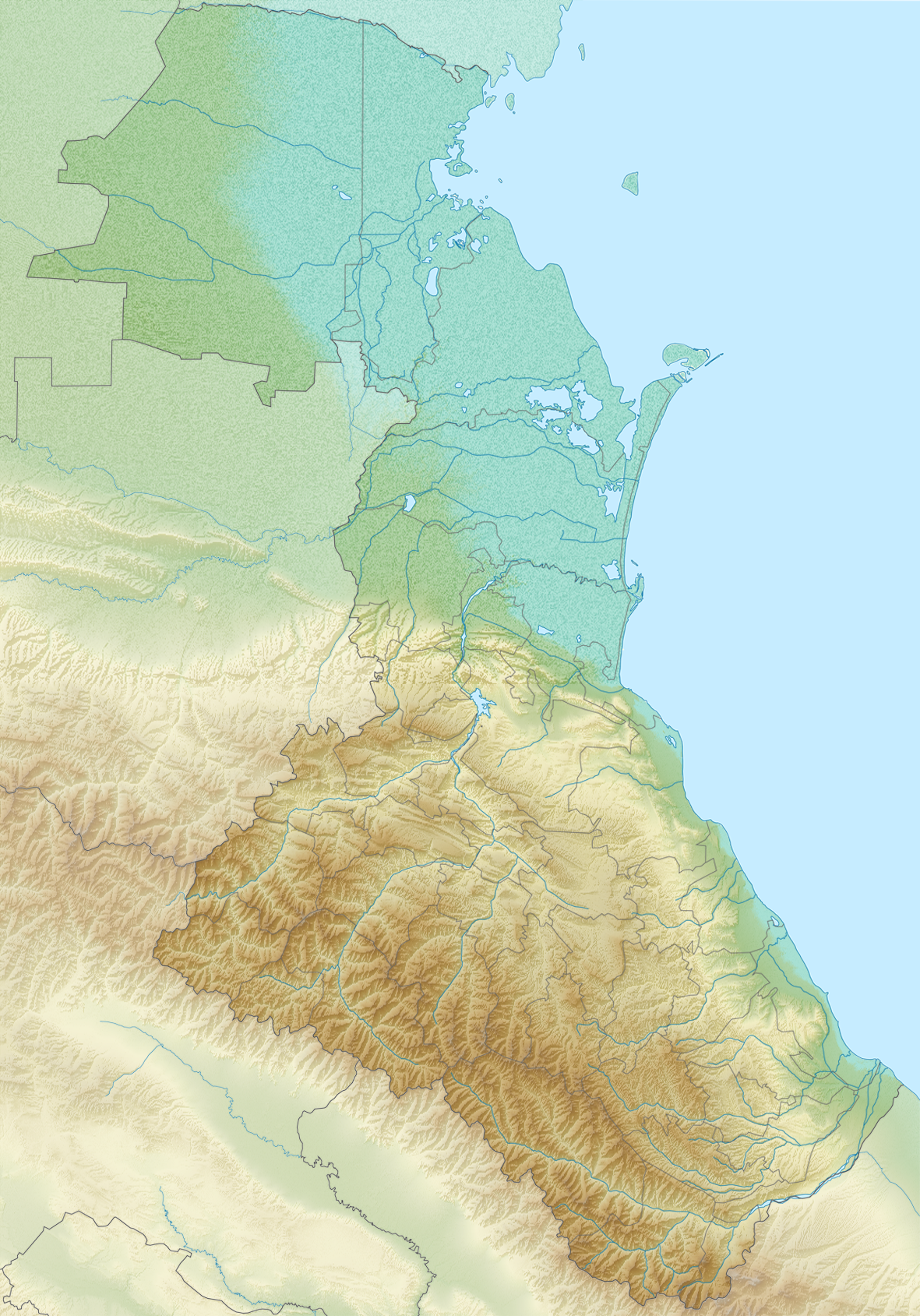
- Location within Caucasus Mountains Location within Chechnya Location within Georgia Location within Republic of Dagestan
- Location: Chechen Republic, Russia / Tusheti, Georgia
- Countries: Georgia; Russia
- Parent range: Pirikita Range

Diklosmta or simply Diklo (Chechen: Дукълуо-Лам, Duklo-Lam, Georgian: დიკლოსმთა) is a peak in the eastern part of the Caucasus Mountains, located mostly in the Russian Republic of Chechnya, with some parts of the peak also located in Dagestan and the Tusheti region of Georgia. The name Diklo(Дукълуо) derives from the Chechen language, and means "snowy peak".

== Geography ==
The mountain is located on the Pirikita Range which lies to the north of the Greater Caucasus Mountain Range. The elevation of the summit is 4,285 m (14,058 ft) above sea level. The mountain has several glaciers, some of which descend deep into the valleys of the Pirikita Range.
