= Keselo =

Medieval Fortress

Coordinates: 42°22′41″N 45°37′55″E

- კესელო
- Omalo, Tusheti, Georgia
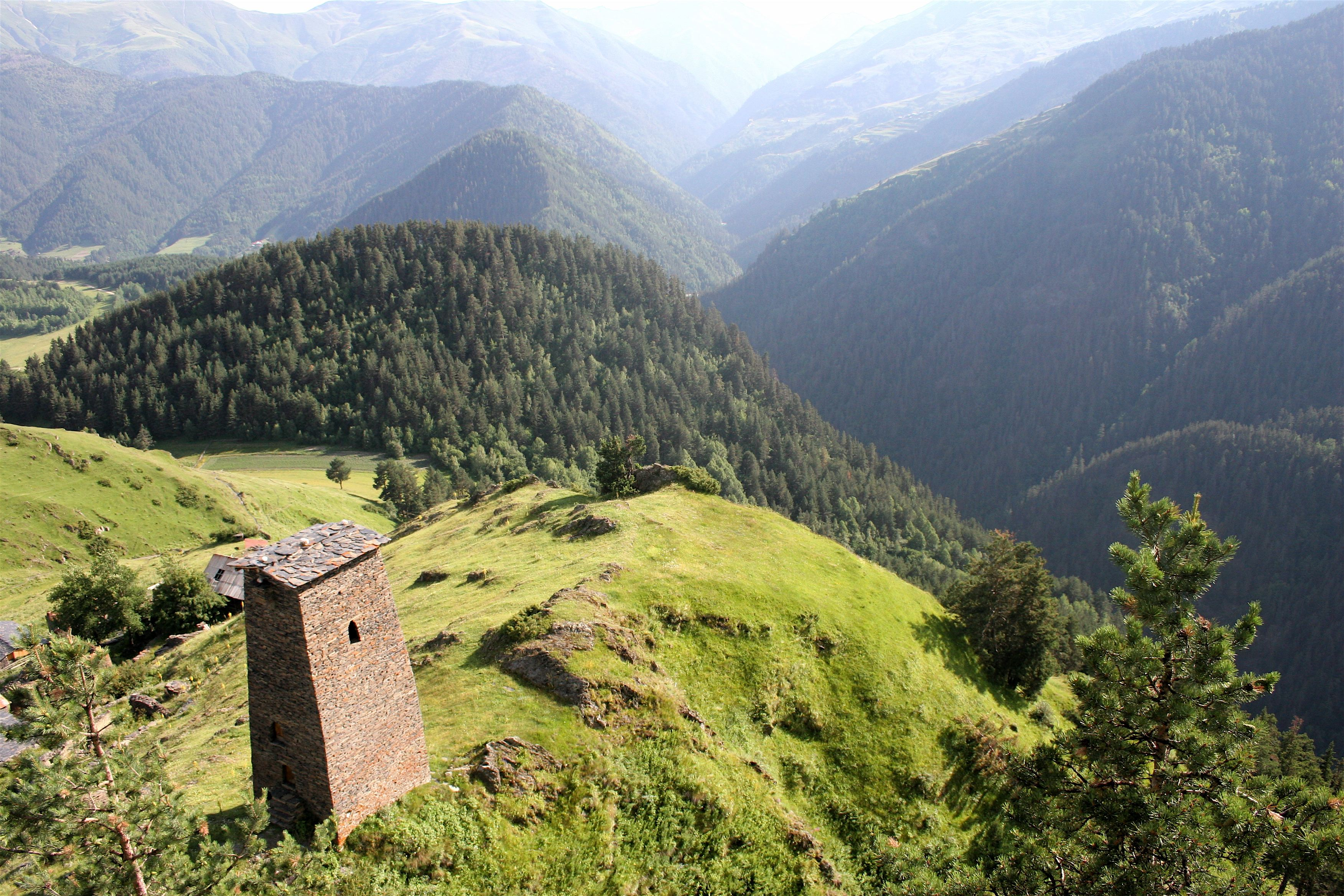

Site information
- Type: Fortress
- Open to the public: Yes
- Condition: Partly restored

Location

Site history
- Built: 1230s
- Built by: Tush people
- Materials: Stone

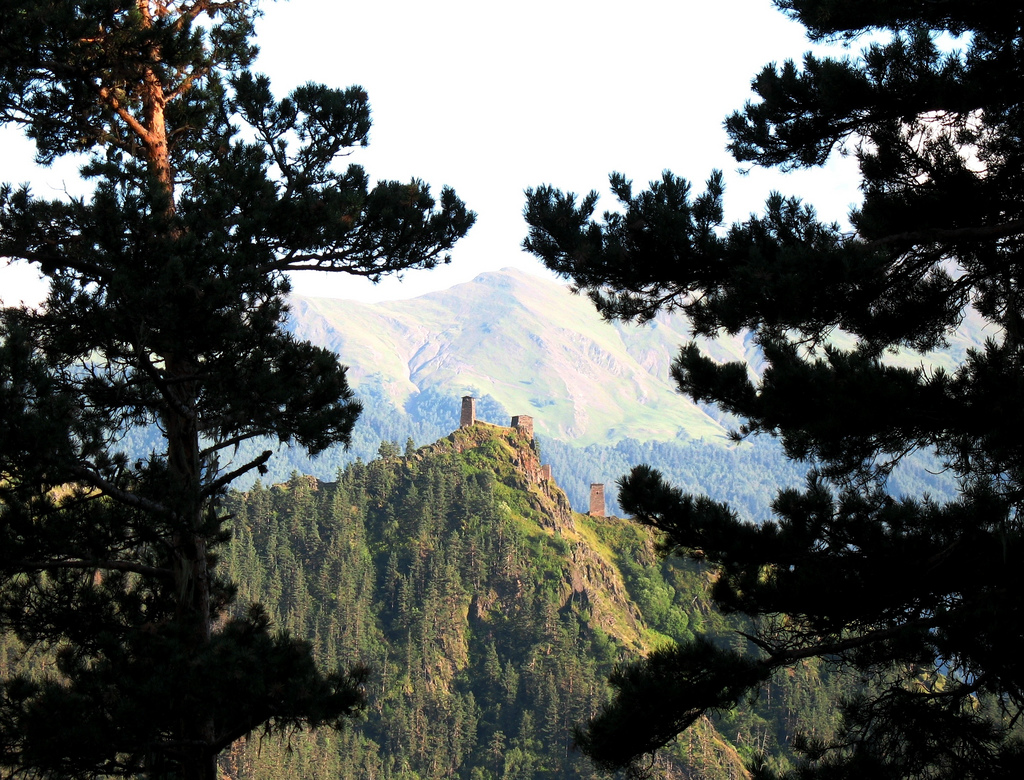
Keselo, Tusheti

Keselo (Georgian: კესელო) is a small medieval fortress just above the village of Omalo in Tusheti (historic geographic area in eastern Georgia). The site is surrounded by the northern slopes of the Greater Caucasus Mountains. It is bordered to the north and east by Russia, to the east by the Georgian historic provinces Kakheti and to the south by Pshav-Khevsureti. The population of the area is mainly ethnic Georgians called Tush or Tushetians (Georgian: tushebi), However, there are some villages nearby which are populated by Daghestanis.

== History ==
Traditionally Tush peoples abandoned their villages and used towers as temporary shelters during raids on their villages. Keselo was constructed during the Mongol invasion of Georgia in 1230s. It originally had 13 towers. The inhabitants of old Omalo used the towers to protect themselves from the invading Mongols and later raids by Daghestani tribes.

By the 20th century, most of the towers were in ruins. However, in 2003, work began to rebuild five towers of the medieval fortress. The project was privately sponsored by Henk and Eliane Hooft, a Dutch family living in Georgia and later by the Keselo Foundation. The restoration was done in accordance with the medieval Tush techniques of constructing fortified towers. A monument was also erected in the nearby village of Dartlo and a tower in Khiso, on the road to Omalo, was also rebuilt. During the work, an array of archaeological artefacts, such as ancient rock art motifs and Bronze Age axes and jewellery, were discovered.

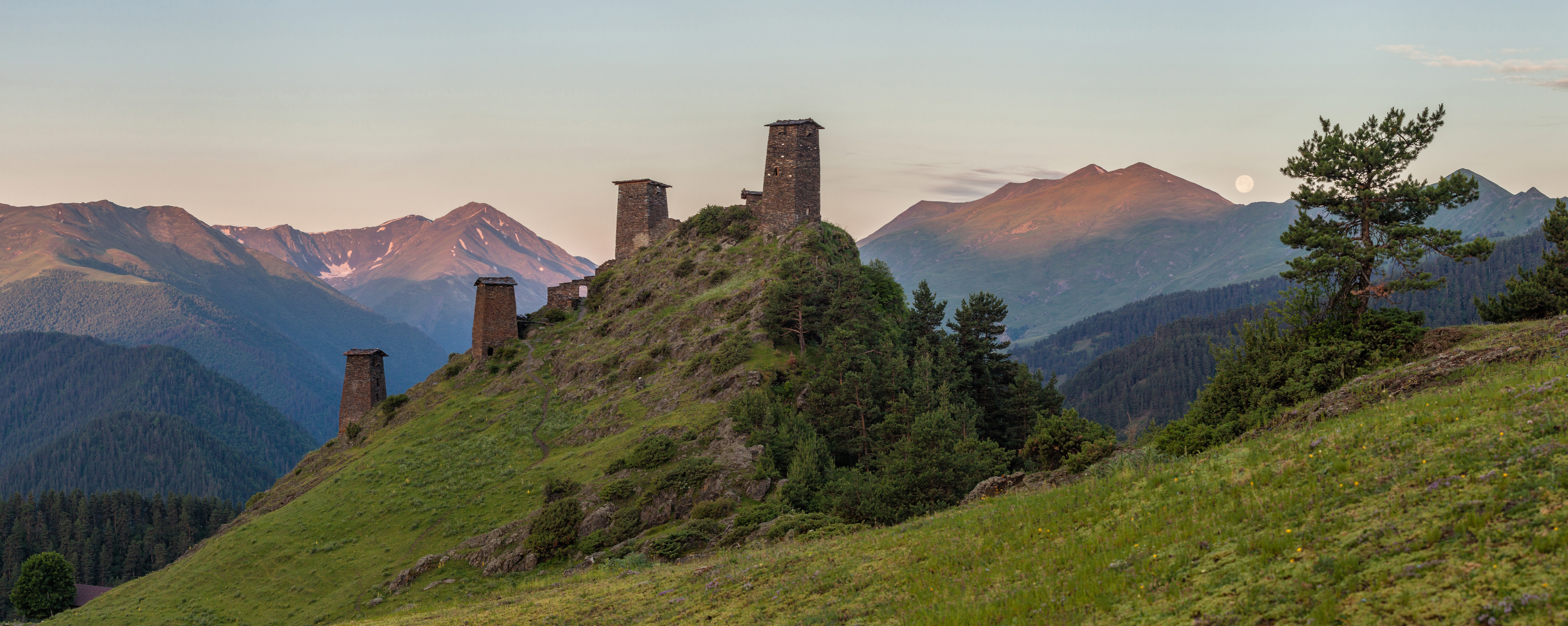
Moonrise over Keselo Fortress
