= Nakh languages =

Branch of the Northeast Caucasian language family

Nakh
- Geographic distribution: Central Caucasus
- Ethnicity: Nakh peoples
- Linguistic classification: Northeast Caucasian: Nakh
- Subdivisions: Vainakh; Bats

Language codes
- Glottolog: nakh1246
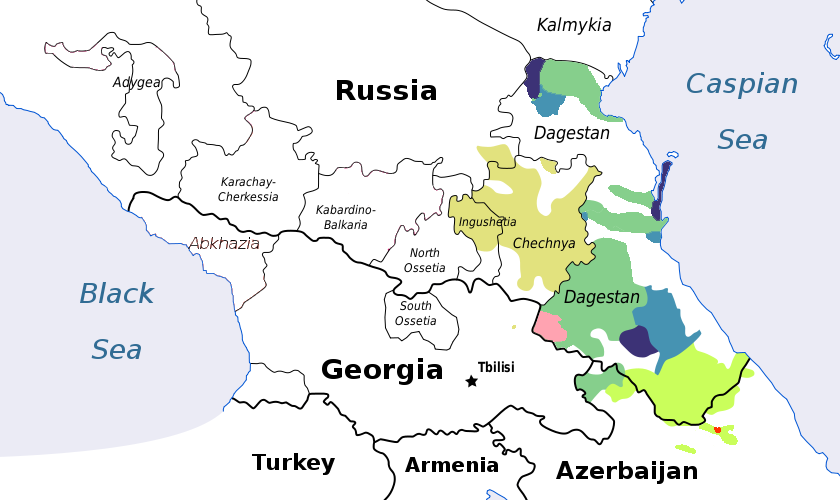
- Nakh

The Nakh languages are a group of languages within the Northeast Caucasian family, spoken chiefly by the Chechens and Ingush in the North Caucasus.

Bats is the endangered language of the Bats people, an ethnic minority in Georgia. The Chechen, Ingush and Bats peoples are also grouped under the ethno-linguistic umbrella of Nakh peoples.

== Classification ==
The Nakh languages were historically classified as an independent North-Central Caucasian family, but are now recognized as a branch of the Northeast Caucasian family.

The separation of Nakh from common Northeast Caucasian has been tentatively dated to the Neolithic (ca. 4th millennium BC).

- Nakh language family
  - Vainakh languages, a dialect continuum with two literary languages:
    - Chechen – approximately 2,000,000 speakers (2020).
    - Ingush – approximately 400,000 speakers (2020).
  - Bats or Batsbi – approximately 3,420 (2000), spoken mostly in Zemo-Alvani, Georgia. Not mutually intelligible with Chechen or Ingush.

== The voicing of ejective consonants ==
The Nakh languages are relevant to the glottalic theory of Indo-European, because the Vainakh branch has undergone the voicing of ejectives that has been postulated but widely derided as improbable in that family. In initial position, Bats ejectives correspond to Vainakh ejectives, but in non-initial position to Vainakh voiced consonants. (The exception is *qʼ, which remains an ejective in Vainakh.)

Bats	Chechen	gloss	Dagestanian cognate
nʕapʼ	naːb	'sleep'	
ʃwetʼ	ʃad	'whip'	Gigatil Chamalal: tsatʼán
pʰakʼal	pʰaɡal	'hare'	Andi: tɬʼankʼala
dokʼ	dwoɡ	'heart'	Andi: rokʷʼo
matsʼ	mezi	'louse'	Chadakolob Avar: natsʼ
ʕartsʼiⁿ	ʕärʒa-	'black'	Gigatil Chamalal: -etʃʼár
jopʼqʼ	juqʼ	'ashes'	

A similar change has taken place in some of the other Dagestanian languages, see Lezgic languages § The voicing of ejective consonants.

A change from ejectives to implosives is also reconstructed in the East Cushitic languages, specifically in Somaloid.

== Proposed connections to extinct languages ==
Many obscure ancient languages or peoples have been postulated by scholars of the Caucasus as Nakh, many in the South Caucasus. None of these have been confirmed; most are classified as Nakh on the basis of placenames.

=== Malkh ===
The language of the Malkhs (whose name, malkh, refers to the sun) in the North Caucasus, who lived in modern day Kabardino-Balkaria, Karachay–Cherkessia, and once briefly conquered Ubykhia and Abkhazia, is believed to be of Nakh affiliation. They were conquered first by Scythian-speaking Alan tribes and then by Turkic tribes, and seem to have largely abandoned their homeland and found shelter among the Chechens, leading to the formation of a teip named after them. Those who stayed behind were either wiped out or assimilated.

=== Dval ===
The language of the Dvals is thought to be Nakh by many historians, though there is a rivaling camp arguing for its status as a close relative of Ossetic. Various backing for the Nakh theory (different scholars use different arguments) includes the presence of Nakh placenames in former Dval territory, evidence of Nakh–Svan contact which probably would've required the Nakh nature of the Dvals or people there before them, and the presence of a foreign-origin Dval clan among the Chechens, seemingly implying that the Dvals found shelter (like the Malkhs are known to have done) among the Chechens from the conquest of their land by foreign invaders (presumably Ossetes).

=== Tsov ===
According to Georgian scholars I. A. Javashvili and Giorgi Melikishvili, the Urartian state of Supani was occupied by the ancient Nakh tribe Tsov, whose state is called Tsobena in ancient Georgian historiography. The Tsov language was the dominant language spoken by its people, and was thought by these Georgian historians (as well as a number of others) to be Nakh. Tsov and its relatives in the area may have contributed to the Hurro-Urartian substratum in the Armenian language.

== See also ==
- Languages of the Caucasus
- Northeast Caucasian languages
- North Caucasian languages
- Alarodian languages
