= Bats language =

Northeast Caucasian language

Bats
- ბაცბა მოტტ Batsba Moṭṭ batsba motjiti
- Pronunciation: [batsʰba motʼː] [batsbur mɔt'ː]
- Native to: North Caucasus
- Region: Zemo-Alvani in Kakheti
- Ethnicity: Bats people
- Native speakers: (500 cited 1997); Far fewer than 3,000 active (2007)
- Language family: Northeast Caucasian: Nakh; Bats
- Writing system: Georgian script

Language codes
- ISO 639-3: bbl
- Glottolog: bats1242
- ELP: Batsbi
- Bats

- Bats is classified as Severely Endangered by the UNESCO Atlas of the World's Languages in Danger

Bats (Batsbur Mott, or Batsba Moṭṭ, ბაცბა მოტტ, [batsʰba motʼː]), also known as Batsbi, Batsi, Batsb, Batsaw, or Tsova-Tush is the endangered language of the Bats people, a North Caucasian minority group living in Georgia. Batsbi is part of the Nakh branch of Northeast Caucasian languages. It had 2,500 to 3,000 speakers in 1975, with only one dialect. Batsbi is only used for spoken communication, as Bats people tend to use Georgian when writing.

== History ==
Tusheti, the northeastern mountainous region of Georgia, is home to four tribes that consider themselves Tushetians: the Batsbi (also known as Tsova-Tush), the Gometsari, the Piriqiti, and the Chagma-Tush. Tsova-Tush people make up 50% of Tushetians. Only several hundred Tsova-Tush people speak the Bats language, whereas the other tribes (Gometsari, Piriqiti and Chagma-Tush) have lost the language. Evidence from toponymics indicates that the other three Tushetian tribes formerly spoke Batsbi, suggesting that all Tushetians once did and over time the Georgian language replaced Batsbi.

By linguistic lineage, the Bats (or Tsova-Tush) language can be traced back to Ghalghai (Ingush) origins.

The mountainous terrain preserved the culture and traditions of Tushetians, but the history of isolation makes it more difficult to document them as only a few records exist.

The first grammar of Batsbi, Über die Thusch-Sprache, was compiled by the German orientalist Anton Schiefner (1817–1879), making it into the first grammar of an indigenous Caucasian language based on sound scientific principles.

== Classification ==
Batsbi belongs to the Nakh branch of the Northeast Caucasian language family. The language is not mutually intelligible with either Chechen or Ingush, the other two Nakh languages.

== Geographic distribution ==
Most speakers of Batsbi live in the village of Zemo Alvani, on the Kakheti Plain, in the Akhmeta Municipality of Georgia. There are some families of Batsbi in Tbilisi and other bigger towns in Georgia.

== Phonology ==
=== Vowels ===
Batsbi has a typologically common five-vowel system. Although some authors claim that all vowels but /u/ contrast in length, no minimal pairs are given in any studies of Batsbi, nor are many examples of long vowels available in the literature.

| | Front | Back |
|---|---|---|
| High | i | u |
| Mid | ɛ | ɔ |
| Low | a aː | |

Batsbi also has the following diphthongs: /ei/, /ui/, /oi/, /ai/, /ou/, and /au/.

All vowels and diphthongs have nasalised allophones that are the result of phonetic and morphophonemic processes: [ ĩ ẽ ã õ ũ ]. Nasalised vowels are represented in the Mkhedruli script via a superscript ⟨ნ⟩ following the vowel in question, as in კნათე^{ნ} for [kʼnatʰẽ] 'boy-GEN'.

=== Consonants ===
Batsbi has a large consonant inventory, relatively typical for a Nakh-Dagestanian language, containing ejectives, pharyngeals and uvulars. Unlike its close Nakh relatives, Chechen and Ingush, Batsbi has on the other hand retained the voiceless lateral fricative /ɬ/. Also notable is the presence of two geminate ejectives, /tʼː/ and /qʼː/, which are cross-linguistically rare.

Consonant Phonemes of Bats
| | | | Labial | Dental | Alveolar | Palatal(ized) | Velar | Uvular | Pharyngeal | Glottal |
|---|---|---|---|---|---|---|---|---|---|---|
| Nasal | | | m | n | | | | | | |
| Plosive | aspirated | lenis | pʰ | tʰ | t͡sʰ | t͡ʃʰ | kʰ | qʰ | | ʔ |
| Plosive | voiceless | fortis | | tː | | | | qː | | |
| Plosive | voiced | | b | d | d͡z | d͡ʒ | g | | | |
| Plosive | ejective | lenis | pʼ | tʼ | t͡sʼ | t͡ʃʼ | kʼ | qʼ | | |
| Plosive | ejective | fortis | | tʼː | | | | qʼː | | |
| Fricative | voiceless | lenis | | | s | ʃ | x | | ħ | h |
| Fricative | voiceless | fortis | | | sː | | xː | | | |
| Fricative | voiceless | lateral | | | ɬ | | | | | |
| Fricative | voiced | | v | | z | ʒ | ɣ | | ʕ | |
| Approximant | | lenis | | l | | j | | | ʕ | |
| Approximant | | fortis | | lː | | | | | | |
| Flap | | | | | ɾ | | | | | |

=== Phonotactics ===
The most common syllable type in Batsbi is CVC. However, Batsbi words commonly contain sequences of two consonants, the second of which is often a fricative (e.g. /ʒ ħ x/). Stop-stop clusters often contain an ejective (e.g. /pʼ tʼ kʼ qʼ/). Cross-linguistically common stop-liquid sequences also occur.

Those two-consonant clusters can occur in any position within the word, although less commonly word-finally. Sequences of three consonants do occur as well, although many are borrowings from Georgian. Like many clusters in non-Indo-European languages, consonant sequences in Batsbi often fail to conform to the sonority sequencing principle.

Word-initial Two-consonant Clusters
| C1 | C2 | Example | | English |
| Stop | Fricative | Example | | English |
|---|---|---|---|---|
| b | ʒ | bʒã | ბჟა^{ნ} | livestock |
| pʰ | ħ | pʰħe | ფჰჾე | village |
| t͡ʃ | x | t͡ʃʰxotʼ | ჩხოტ | waterfall |
| kʼ | ʕ | kʼʕokʼ | კჺოკ | hole |
| m | ʕ | mʕal | მჺალ | common |
| Stop | Stop | Example | | English |
| tʼ | qʼ | tʼqʼa | ტყა | twenty |
| kʼ | n | kʼnatʰẽ | კნათე^{ნ} | boy |
| t͡ʃʼ | qʼ | t͡ʃʼqʼempʷʼ | ჭყემპუ | throat |
| Stop | Liquid | Example | | English |
| pʰ | l | ploko | ფლოქუ | New Year ritual |
| t͡s | ɾ | t͡sɾintʼ | ცრინტ | infant |
| qʼ | l | qʼloɾtʼ | ყლორტ | gulp |
| kʼ | ɾ | kʼɾampʼul | კრამპულ | tusk |
| Fricative | Stop | Example | | English |
| s | tʼ | stʼakʼ | სტაკ | man |
| x | kʼ | xkʼor | ხკორ | bladder |

Word-initial Three-consonant Clusters
| C1 | C2 | C3 | Example | | English |
|---|---|---|---|---|---|
| pʰ | s | tʼ | pʰstʼu | ფსტუ | wife |
| tʰ | x | ɾ | tʰxɾil | თხრილ | ditch |
| tʼ | kʼ | m | tʼkʼmel | ტკმელ | dust |
| tʼ | qʼ | v | tʼqʼve | ტყვე | prisoner |
| g | ɾ | d | gɾdeml | გრდემლ | anvil |

Of the words containing three-consonant onsets above, only /pstʼu/ "wife" and /tʼkʼmel/ "dust" are native to Batsbi, the rest being loanwords from Georgian.

Word-final clusters
| C1 | C2 | Example | | English |
|---|---|---|---|---|
| ɾ | kʼ | tsaɾkʼ | ცარკ | tooth |
| pʰ | x | vepʰx | ვეფხ | tiger |
| tʰ | x | matʰx | მათხ | sun |
| v | r | skʼivɾ | სკივრ | chest, trunk |
| n | tʼ | abʒontʼ | აბჟონტ | stirrup |

== Writing system ==
=== Comparison table ===
| Schiefner, 1856 | Imnaishvili, 1977 | | Kadagidze, 1984 | | Holisky & Gagua (1994) | Mikeladze, 2012 | | Desheriev, 1953 | Chrelashvili, 1999 | IPA |
| Schiefner, 1856 | Georgian transcription | Latin transcription | Georgian transcription | Latin transcription | Holisky & Gagua (1994) | Georgian transcription | Latin transcription | Desheriev, 1953 | Chrelashvili, 1999 | IPA |
|---|---|---|---|---|---|---|---|---|---|---|
| a | ა | a | ა | a | a | ა, ⁀ა | A a, ⁀A ⁀a | а | а | a |
| a | ა | a | ა | a | a | | Ǎ ǎ, â | а͏̆ | а͏̆ | ă |
| a | | ā | | ā | a: | | Ā ā | а̄ | а̄ | aː |
| a | | ā | | ā | a: | | ā̄ | а̄ | а̄ | aː |
| a | აჼ | aⁿ | აჼ | aⁿ | aⁿ | აჼ, ⁀აჼ | Ã ã, ⁀Ã ⁀ã | а̃ | а̃ | ã |
| a | აჼ | aⁿ | აჼ | aⁿ | aⁿ | | Ā̃ ā̃ | а̃ | а̃ | ãː |
| b | ბ | b | ბ | b | b | ბ | B b | б | б | b |
| g | გ | g | გ | g | g | გ | G g | г | г | ɡ |
| d | დ | d | დ | d | d | დ | D d | д | д | d |
| e | ე | e | ე | e | e | ე | E e | е, э | е | e |
| e | ე | e | ე | e | e | ⁀ | Ē ē, ⁀Ē ⁀ē | е, э | е̄ | eː |
| e | | ĕ | | ĕ | _ | | ě, ê | е͏̆ | е͏̆ | ĕ |
| e | ეჼ | eⁿ | ეჼ | eⁿ | eⁿ | ეჼ | Ẽ ẽ | е̃ | е̃ | ẽ |
| e | ეჼ | eⁿ | ეჼ | eⁿ | eⁿ | | Ē̃ ē̃ | е̃ | е̃ | ẽː |
| w | ვ | v | ვ | v | v | ვ | V v | в | в | v |
| z | ზ | z | ზ | z | z | ზ | Z z | з | з | z |
| t̔ | თ | t | თ | t | t | თ | T t | т | т | tʰ |
| t̔ | თთ | tt | თჾ | tჾ | t: | თჾ | tჾ | тт | тт | tː |
| i | ი | i | ი | i | i | ი, ⁀ი | I i, ⁀I ⁀i | и | и | i |
| i | ი | i | ი | i | i | | Ī ī | ӣ | ӣ | iː |
| i | | ĭ | | ĭ | I | | î | и͏̆ | и͏̆ | ĭ |
| i | იჼ | iⁿ | იჼ | iⁿ | iⁿ | იჼ | Ĩ ĩ | и̃ | и̃ | ĩ |
| i | იჼ | iⁿ | იჼ | iⁿ | iⁿ | | Ī̃ ī̃ | и̃ | и̃ | ĩː |
| k | კ | ḳ | კ | ḳ | kʼ | კ | Ḳ ḳ | кӀ | кӀ | kʼ |
| l | ლ | l | ლ | l | l | ლ | L l | л | л | l |
| l | ლლ | ll | ლჾ | lჾ | l: | ლჾ | lჾ | лл | лл | lː |
| l͓ | ლʻ | lʻ | ლʻ | lʻ | ɫ | ლʻ | lʻ | лъ | лъ | ɬ |
| m | მ | m | მ | m | m | მ | M m | м | м | m |
| n | ნ | n | ნ | n | n | ნ | N n | н | н | n |
| j | ჲ | j | ჲ | j | j | ჲ | J j | й | й | j |
| j | ჲ | j | ჲ | j | j | ჲჼ | j̇̃ | й | й | j̃ |
| o | ო | o | ო | o | o | ო, ⁀ო | O o, ⁀O ⁀o | о | о | o |
| o | ო | o | ო | o | o | | Ō ō | о̄ | о̄ | oː |
| o | ო | o | ო | o | o | | ō̄ | о̄ | о̄ | oː |
| o | | ŏ | | ŏ | O | | ǒ, ô | о͏̆ | о͏̆ | ŏ |
| o | ოჼ | oⁿ | ოჼ | oⁿ | oⁿ | ოჼ | Õ õ | о̃ | о̃ | õ |
| o | ოჼ | oⁿ | ოჼ | oⁿ | oⁿ | | Ō̃ ō̃ | о̃ | о̃ | õː |
| p | პ | p̣ | პ | p̣ | pʼ | პ | P̣ p̣ | пӀ | пӀ | pʼ |
| z̔ | ჟ | ž | ჟ | ž | ž | ჟ | Ž ž | ж | ж | ʒ |
| r | რ | r | რ | r | r | რ | R r | р | р | ɾ |
| r | რʻ | rʻ | რ | r | r | რʻ | rʻ | р | р | ɾ̥ |
| s | ს | s | ს | s | s | ს | S s | с | с | s |
| s | სს | ss | სჾ | sჾ | s: | სჾ | sჾ | сс | сс | sː |
| t | ტ | ṭ | ტ | ṭ | tʼ | ტ | Ṭ ṭ | тӀ | тӀ | tʼ |
| t | ტტ | ṭṭ | ტჾ | ṭჾ | tʼ: | ტჾ | ṭჾ | тӀтӀ | тӀтӀ | tʼː |
| u | უ | u | უ | u | u | უ, ⁀უ | U u, ⁀U ⁀u | у | у | u |
| u | უ | u | უ | u | u | | Ū ū | у | ӯ | uː |
| u | | ŭ | | ŭ | U | | Ǔ ǔ, û | у͏̆ | у͏̆ | ŭ |
| u | უჼ | uⁿ | უჼ | uⁿ | uⁿ | უჼ, ⁀უჼ | Ũ ũ, ⁀Ũ ⁀ũ | у̃ | у̃ | ũ |
| p̔ | ფ | p | ფ | p | p | ფ | P p | п | п | pʰ |
| k̔ | ქ | k | ქ | k | k | ქ | K k | к | к | kʰ |
| g̔ | ღ | ɣ | ღ | ɣ | ǧ | ღ | Ɣ ɣ | гӀ | гӀ | ɣ |
| q | ყ | q̣ | ყ | q̣ | qʼ | ყ | Q̣ q̣ | къ | къ | qʼ |
| q | ყყ | q̣q̣ | ყჾ | q̣ჾ | qʼ: | ყჾ | q̣ჾ | къкъ | къкъ | qʼː |
| s̔ | შ | š | შ | š | š | შ | Š š | ш | ш | ʃ |
| s̔ | შ | š | შ | š | š | შჾ | šჾ | ш | ш | ʃː |
| c̔ | ჩ | č | ჩ | č | č | ჩ | Č č | ч | ч | t͡ʃʰ |
| c | ც | c | ც | c | c | ც | C c | ц | ц | t͡sʰ |
| ʒ | ძ | ʒ | ძ | ʒ | ʒ | ძ | Ʒ ʒ | дз | дз | d͡z |
| c̣ | წ | c̣ | წ | c̣ | cʼ | წ | C̣ c̣ | цӀ | цӀ | t͡sʼ |
| c̣̔ | ჭ | č̣ | ჭ | č̣ | čʼ | ჭ | Č̣ č̣ | чӀ | чӀ | t͡ʃʼ |
| x | ხ | x | ხ | x | x | ხ | X x | х | х | x |
| x | ხხ | xx | ხჾ | xჾ | x: | ხჾ | xჾ | хх | хх | xː |
| q | ჴ | q | ჴ | q | q | ჴ | Q q | кх | кх | qʰ |
| q | ჴჴ | qq | ჴჾ | qჾ | q: | ჴჾ | qჾ | ккх | кхкх | qː |
| ʒ̔ | ჯ | ǯ | ჯ | ǯ | ǯ | ჯ | Ǯ ǯ | дж | дж | d͡ʒ |
| x̣ | ჰ | h | ჰ | h | h | ჰ | H h | хӀ | хӀ | h |
| ḥ | ჰჾ | hჾ | ჰ_{⌝} | h_{⌝} | ħ | ჰ⁊ | H⁊ h⁊/Ⱨ ⱨ | хь | хь | ħ |
| ḥ | ჵ | ꞷ | ჵ | | _ | ჵ | ꞷ | Ӏъ | Ӏъ | ʡ |
| ʼ | ʻ | ʻ | ჺ | ʻ | ʕ | ჺ/ع | ʻ | Ӏ | Ӏ | ʕ |
| — | ʼ | ʼ | ჸ | ʼ | ʔ | ჸ | ʼ | ʼ | ъ | ʔ |
| — | — | — | — | — | — | — | — | ф | — | f |
| — | | w | — | — | — | — | — | — | — | w |

== Morphosyntax ==
Batsbi is an SOV language with ergative-absolutive alignment which makes extensive use of bound morphological derivation and inflection. It has both grammatical gender (i.e. noun classes) and several grammatical cases.

=== Pronouns ===
==== Personal pronouns - first and second persons ====
Batsbi pronouns encode three persons, two numbers, and clusivity for first person plural ("you and me and maybe them" vs. "me and them"). Demonstratives work as third person pronouns.

It is noteworthy that for singular first person ('I') and second person ('you') almost always differ systematically by a single consonant, first person having /s/ and second person /ħ/, whereas the plural forms regularly have /txo/ for first person exclusive, and /ʃu/ for second person. Case endings are regular for all pronouns, shown below.

| | Singular | | Plural | | |
| | First | Second | First Inclusive | First Exclusive | Second |
|---|---|---|---|---|---|
| Nominative | სო so | ჰჾო ħo | ვე/ვაი ve/vai | თხო txo | შუ šu |
| Ergative | ას as | აჰჾ aħ | ვე ve | ათხ atx | ეშ eš |
| Genitive | სე^{ნ} sẽ | ჰჾე^{ნ} ħẽ | ვაი^{ნ} vaĩ | თხე^{ნ} txõ | შე^{ნ} šũ |
| Dative | სონ son | ჰჾონ ħon | ვაინ vain | თხონ txon | შუნ šun |
| Allative | სოგუ sogu | ჰჾოგუ ħogu | ვაიგუ vaigu | თხოგუ txogu | შუგუ šugu |
| Adverbial | სოღ soǧ | ჰჾოღ ħoǧ | ვაიღ vaiǧ | თხოღ txoǧ | შუღ šuǧ |
| English | I | You (Thou) | You and us | Us but not you | You (Ye) |

==== Third person pronouns/Demonstratives ====
In Batsbi, the distal demonstrative ('that yonder') also serves as a third person pronoun ('s/he', 'it', 'they'). As such, the language does not encode gender in its pronouns. However, gender may still be indexed on verbs and adjectives.

| | Singular | Plural |
|---|---|---|
| Nominative | ო o | ობი obi |
| Ergative | ოჴუს oqus | ოჴარ oqar |
| Genitive | ოჴუი^{ნ} oquĩ | ოჴრი^{ნ} oqrĩ |
| Dative | ოჴუინ oquin | ოჴარნ oqarn |
| Instrumental | ოჴუვ oquv | |
| English | s/he | they |

==== Adnominal demonstratives ====
| | Proximal | Medial | Distal |
|---|---|---|---|
| Absolutive | ე e | ის is | ო o |
| Oblique | ეჴ eq | იცხ icx | ოჴ oq |
| English | this | that | that yonder |

Adnominal demonstratives code no gender in Batsbi.

ე ფსტუიჩოვ
e pstʼuičov
DEM.proximal woman-ERG
"This woman"

ე სტაკოვ
e stʼakʼov
DEM.proximal man-ERG
"This man

ო სტაკოვ
o stʼakʼov
DEM.distal man-ERG
"That man over there"

==== Interrogative pronouns ====
| | who? | what? | when? | how much? | where? | which one? |
|---|---|---|---|---|---|---|
| Absolutive | მე^{ნ} mẽ | ვუხ vux | მაცა^{ნ} macã | მელʻ meɬ | მიჩ, მიჩა mič, miča | მენუხ menux |
| Ergative | ჰჾა^{ნ} ħã | სტევ st'ev | მაცა^{ნ} macã | მელʻ meɬ | მიჩ, მიჩა mič, miča | მენხუიჩოვ menxuičov |

=== Noun classes ===
As in other Nakh languages, Batsbi has several noun classes (grammatical genders) that are indexed through class prefixes on some vowel-initial verbs, adjectives, numerals, and a few other words. That is, nouns themselves show no morphologically marks for gender. Gender indexing is highly complex in the language, with subject gender agreement on intransitive verbs (absolutive), but object agreement on transitive verbs. The table below shows gender agreement on verbs for three of the noun classes:

| Noun class | Subject | Verb group | Translation |
| Noun class | Intransitive (subject agreement) | | |
|---|---|---|---|
| M | ვაშუ vašu | ვახე^{ნ} v-axẽ | Brother M-left |
| F | ჲაშუ jašu | ჲახე^{ნ} j-axẽ | Sister F-left |
| D | ბადერ bader | დახე^{ნ} d-axẽ | The child D-left |
| Bd | ფჰჾუ pħu | ბახე^{ნ} b-axẽ | The dog Bd-left |
| | Transitive (object agreement) | | |
| M | ნანას nanas | ვაშუ ვიკე^{ნ} vašu v-ik'ẽ | Mother M-took brother (lit. "Mother brother took") |
| F | დადას dadas | ჲაშუ ჲიკე^{ნ} jašu j-ik'ẽ | Father F-took sister (lit. "Father sister took") |
| D | ნანას nanas | ბადერ დიკე^{ნ} bader d-ik'ẽ | Mother D-took the child |
| Bd | დადას dadas | ფჰჾუ ბიკე^{ნ} pħu b-ik'ẽ | Father Bd-took the dog |

==== Number of classes ====
Holisky and Gagua (1994) analyse Batsbi as having five noun classes, whereas Alice Harris posits that Batsbi has eight genders in total, based on the behaviour of words that fail to conform to the patterns of the five major classes. The breakdown below follows Harris:

| Label | Singular | Plural | Description | Nouns | Adjective "big" | Verb "to be" | English |
|---|---|---|---|---|---|---|---|
| M | v- | b- | male humans | მარ mar; ჺუვ ʕuv; ვოჰჾ voħ | ვაჴჴო^{ნ} v-aqqõ | ვა v-a | "the husband is big" "the shepherd is big" "the son is big" |
| F | j- | d- | female humans | ნან nan; ფსტუ pstʼu; ჲოჰჾ joħ | ჲაჴჴო^{ნ} j-aqqõ | ჲა j-a | "the mother is big" "the wife is big" "the daughter is big" |
| D | d- | | various, default class for unknown gender | ბადერ bader; კუიტი kʼuit'i; დოკ dokʼ; დითხ ditx | დაჴჴო^{ნ} d-aqqõ | და d-a | "the child is big" "the cat is big" "the heart is big" "the meat is big" |
| Bd | b- | d- | animals | ფჰჾუ pħu; ჩა ča | ბაჴჴო^{ნ} b-aqqõ | ბა b-a | "the dog is big" "the bread is big" "the bear is big" |
| J | j- | | various | ცარკ carkʼ; მაიჴი maiqi; ყარ q'ar | ჲაჴჴო^{ნ} j-aqqõ ჲ-ავი^{ნ} j-avĩ | ჲა j-a | "the tooth is big" "the milk is light" "the rain is light" |
| *Bd | b- | d- | body parts (15 nouns) | ბაქ bak; ბჺარკ bʕarkʼ; ჭყემპუ čʼqʼempʷʼ | ბაჴჴო^{ნ} b-aqqõ | ბა b-a | "the fist is big" "the eye is big" "the throat is big" |
| *D/J | d- | j- | body parts (4 nouns) | ბატრ batʼr; ლარკ larkʼ; ტოტ tʼotʼ; ჭამაღ čʼamaǧ | დაჴჴო^{ნ} d-aqqõ | და d-a | "the lip is big" "the ear is big" "the hand is big" "the cheek is big" |
| *B/B | b- | | only 3 nouns | ბორაგ borag; ჩექამ čekam; ქაქამ kakam | ბაჴჴო^{ნ} b-aqqõ | ბა b-a | "the knit slipper is big" "the boot is big" "the autumn wool is big" |

==== Exceptions and Nouns without inherent gender ====
According to Holisky and Gagua (1994), the class with the largest number of nouns is the D-class (e.g. da "it is"), followed by the J-class (e.g. ja "it is"). Class D markers are also used when the noun class is unknown (as in open interrogatives, see 1a) and in clauses with mixed genders (1d).

ვუხ და
vux d-a
what Cl.D-be
"What is it?"

ღოჭ ჲა
ǧočʼ j-a
stick Cl.J-be
"It is a stick"

ნექ და
nek d-a
knife Cl.D-be
"It is a knife"

ღოჭე ნექე და
ǧočʼe neke d-a
stick-and knife-and Cl.D-be
"It is both a stick and knife"

Additionally, some nouns referring to humans have no inherent gender, so that class agreement is contextual. These include the words for "teacher" (უჩიტელ učitʼel), "friend" (ნაყბისტ naq'bist'), "enemy" (მასთხოვ mastxov), "neighbor" (მეზობელ mezobel) and others.

უჩიტელ ვა
učitʼel v-a
teacher Cl.M-is
"He is a teacher"

უჩიტელ ჲა
učitʼel j-a
teacher Cl.F-is
"She is a teacher"

Gender is lexicalized in a few words such as vašu (ვაშუ "brother") vs. jašu (ჲაშუ "sister"), in that -ašu could be translated as "sibling".

==== Gender agreement in adjectives ====
Only eight vowel-initial adjectives agree in gender with the noun they modify:

Adjective agreement (singular)
| Gender (sg/pl) | -aqqõ | -ut'q'ĩ | -avĩ | -acĩ | -uq'ĩ | -asẽ | -acũ | -axxẽ |
|---|---|---|---|---|---|---|---|---|
| Gender (sg/pl) | -აჴჴო^{ნ} | -უტყი^{ნ} | -ავი^{ნ} | -აცი^{ნ} | -უყი^{ნ} | -ასე^{ნ} | -აცუ^{ნ} | -ახხე^{ნ} |
| M (v-/b-) | v-aqqõ | v-ut'q'ĩ | v-avĩ | v-acĩ | v-uq'ĩ | v-asẽ | v-acũ | v-axxẽ |
| F (j-/d-) | j-aqqõ | j-ut'q'ĩ | j-avĩ | j-acĩ | j-uq'ĩ | j-asẽ | j-acũ | j-axxẽ |
| D (d-) | d-aqqõ | d-ut'q'ĩ | d-avĩ | d-acĩ | d-uq'ĩ | d-asẽ | d-acũ | d-axxẽ |
| J (j-) | j-aqqõ | j-ut'q'ĩ | j-avĩ | j-acĩ | j-uq'ĩ | j-asẽ | j-acũ | j-axxẽ |
| Bd (b-/d-) | b-aqqõ | b-ut'q'ĩ | b-avĩ | b-acĩ | b-uq'ĩ | b-asẽ | b-acũ | b-axxẽ |
| English | "big" | "small" | "light" | "heavy" | "thick" | "empty" | "short" | "long" |

=== Grammatical number and case ===
Batsbi nouns are inflected for two numbers, singular and plural, and nine cases. Number inflection occurs via suffixation and/or root changes, and is chiefly unpredictable. Harris (ms) identifies nine suffixes for plural marking in the nominative case; note that vowel changes (i.e. ablaut) may also affect the root of the plural form.

Nominative
| Suffix | Nom-Singular | Nom-Plural | English |
|---|---|---|---|
| -i | საგ sag | საგი sag-i | deer |
| -iš | ნიყ niq' | ნიყიშ niq'-iš | road(s) |
| -bi | ხე^{ნ} xẽ | ხენბი xen-bi | tree(s) |
| -mi | დოკ dok' | დაკმი dak'-mi | heart(s) |
| -arč | ფჰჾუ pḥu | ფჰჾარჩ pḥ-arč | dog(s) |
| -erč | ტჺირ tʼʕir | ტჺირერჩ tʼʕir-erč | star(s) |
| -ar | კეჭ kʼeč̣ | კაჭარ kʼač̣-ar | bundle(s) |
| -er | ჲოპყ jopʼqʼ | აპყერ apʼqʼ-er | ash(es) |

Batsbi makes use of nine noun cases total. In the majority of nouns, the ergative and instrumental cases have a common form.

| | ნეკ nekʼ 'knife' | | ცოკალ t͜sʰokʼal 'fox' | | დოკ dok' 'heart' | |
| | Singular | Plural | Singular | Plural | Singular | Plural |
|---|---|---|---|---|---|---|
| Nominative | nekʼ | nekʼi | t͡sʰokʼal | t͡sʰokʼli | dok' | dak'bi |
| Genitive | nekʼẽ | nekʼã | t͡sʰokʼlẽ | t͡sʰokʼlã | dak'ĩ | dak'bĩ |
| Dative | nekʼen | nekʼin | t͡sʰokʼlen | t͡sʰokʼlin | dak'an | dak'bin |
| Ergative/Instrumental | nekʼev | nekʼiv | t͡sʰokʼlev | t͡sʰokʼliv | dak'av | dak'bav |
| Contacting | nek'ex | nekʼax | t͡sʰokʼlex | t͡sʰokʼlax | dak'ox | dak'bax |
| Allative | nekʼegʷ | nekʼigʷ | t͡sʰokʼlegʷ | t͡sʰokʼligʷ | dak'ogʷ | dak'bigʷ |
| Adverbial | nekʼeɣ | nekʼiɣ | t͡sʰokʼleɣ | t͡sʰokʼliɣ | dak'oɣ | dak'biɣ |
| Comitative | nekʼt͡sʰĩ, nekʼet͡sʰĩ | nekʼicĩ | t͡sʰokʼlet͡sʰĩ | t͡sʰokʼlit͡sʰĩ | | |

=== Verbs ===
Verbs in Batsbi encode not only tense, and aspect, but also gender, person, mood, and other categories. Person suffixes also encode whether the subject of the verb is ergative or absolutive. Person suffixes for are shown in the table below. Note that Batsbi verbs also agree with the object through a prefix denoting a noun class, not shown in the table that follows.

| | | Singular | Plural |
|---|---|---|---|
| First | Ergative to cut | თეტოს tet'o-s | თეტოთხ tet'o-tx |
| First | Absolutive to take | -იკესუ -ikʼe-sʷ | -იკესთხუ -ikʼe-txʷ |
| Second | Ergative to cut | თეტოჰჾ tet'o-ħ | თეტუიშ tet'w-iš |
| Second | Absolutive to take | -ისკეჰჾუ -ikʼe-ħʷ | -ისკეშუ -ikʼe-šʷ |
| Third | Ergative to cut | თეცტ^{უ} tet'ʷ | |
| Third | Absolutive to take | | |

Batsbi has explicit inflections for agentivity of a verb; it makes a distinction between:

as woʒe (I fell down through no fault of my own)
so woʒe (I fell down and it was my own fault)

=== Postpositions ===
In Batsbi, a number of spatial and time relations are expressed via postpositions. In many cases, the nouns that precede the postposition occur in the dative case, although there are exceptions.

| Postposition | Example | English |
|---|---|---|
| მაქ mak | ტივენ მაქ ბა t'iv-en mak ba | They (M) are on the bridge (lit. bridge on they.are) |
| on | ტივენ მაქ ბა t'iv-en mak ba | They (M) are on the bridge (lit. bridge on they.are) |
| კიკელ kʼikʼel | ტივენ კიკელ ვაიხნას tʼiv-en kʼikʼel vaixnas | I (M) walked under the bridge (lit. bridge under I walked) |
| under | ტივენ კიკელ ვაიხნას tʼiv-en kʼikʼel vaixnas | I (M) walked under the bridge (lit. bridge under I walked) |
| ფეხ pex | ნანენ ფეხ nan-en pex | Next to mother (lit. mother next to) |
| next to | ნანენ ფეხ nan-en pex | Next to mother (lit. mother next to) |
| ჰჾათხ(ე) ħatx(e) | წენინ ჰჾათხე c'en-in ħatxe | In front of the house (lit. house in front of) |
| in front of | წენინ ჰჾათხე c'en-in ħatxe | In front of the house (lit. house in front of) |

Some of the directions or states which in English and Indo-European languages are expressed via prepositions, are in Batsbi expressed via locative cases.

=== Word order ===
The neutral word order in Batsbi is SOV.

სტაკოვ ჲაჰჾონ ჴირ ბალინ
stʼakʼov jaħon qor balin
man-ERG girl-DAT apple B.Cl-give.AOR
"The man gave an apple to the girl"

ფსარე ფჰჾე ჲაიხნას
psare pħe jaixnas
yesterday village F.Cl-go-1S.ERG
"I (a woman) went to the village yesterday"

== Vocabulary ==
=== Numerals ===
Like most of its relatives, Batsbi numerals are vigesimal, using 20 as a common base. This is mainly evident in the construction of higher decads, so:

40 (šauztʼqʼ) is formed from 2 × 20
200 (icʼatʼqʼ) formed from is 10 × 20

When modifying nominals, the numeral precedes the noun it modifies.

==== Basic numbers ====
Basic numbers
| Number | Name | | Number | Name | | Structure |
|---|---|---|---|---|---|---|
| 1 | ცᲰჲა | cħa | 11 | ცᲰჲაიტტ | cħaitʼtʼ | 1+10 |
| 2 | ში | ši | 12 | შიიტტ | šiitʼtʼ | 2+10 |
| 3 | ჴო | qo | 13 | ჴოიტტ | qoitʼtʼ | 3+10 |
| 4 | -Ჰჲივჸ | D-ʕivʔ | 14 | -Ჰჲივაიტტ | D-ʕevaitʼtʼ | 4+10 |
| 5 | ფხი | pxi | 15 | ფხიიტტ | pxiitʼtʼ | 5+10 |
| 6 | ჲეთხ | jetx | 16 | ჲეთხაიტტ | jetxaitʼtʼ | 6+10 |
| 7 | ვორლ′ | vorɬ | 17 | ვორლ′აიტტ | vorɬaitʼtʼ | 7+10 |
| 8 | ბარლ′ | barɬ | 18 | ბარლ′აიტტ | barɬaitʼtʼ | 8+10 |
| 9 | ისს | iss | 19 | ᲢᲧეხᲬ | tʼqʼexcʼ | 20–1 |
| 10 | იტტ | itʼtʼ | 20 | ᲢᲧა | tʼqʼa | |

==== Higher decads ====
Higher decads
| Number | Form | | Structure |
|---|---|---|---|
| 21 | ტᲧაცᲰჲა | tʼqʼacħa | 20+1 |
| 22 | ტᲧაშ | tʼqʼaš | 20+2 |
| 30 | ტᲧაიტტ | tʼqʼaitʼtʼ | 20+10 |
| 31 | ტყაცჰჲაიტტ | tʼqʼacħaitʼtʼ | (20+1)+10 |
| 32 | ტყაშიიტტ | tʼqʼašiitʼtʼ | (20+2)+10 |
| 40 | შაუზტყ | šauztʼqʼ | 2×20 |
| 50 | შაუზტყაიტტ | šauztʼqʼaitʼtʼ | (2×20)+10 |
| 60 | ჴოუზტყ | qouztʼqʼ | 3×20 |
| 70 | ჴოუზტყაიტტ | qouztʼqʼaitʼtʼ | (3×20)+10 |
| 80 | -Ჰჲე(ვ)უზტყ | D-ʕe(v)uztʼqʼ | 4×20 |
| 90 | -Ჰჲე(ვ)უზტყაიტტ | D-ʕe(v)uztʼqʼaitʼtʼ | (4×20)+10 |
| 100 | ფხაუზტყ | pxauztʼqʼ | 5×20 |
| 120 | ჲეხწატყ | jexcʼatʼqʼ | 6×20 |
| 160 | ბარლ′წატყ | barɬcʼatʼqʼ | 8×20 |
| 200 | იცატყ | icʼatʼqʼ | 10×20 |
| 1000 | ათას | atas | from Georgian |

In Bats, as in its closest relatives Chechen and Ingush, the number four (Dʕivʔ) begins with a noun-class marker, represented by D (by default, or another capital letter for the other classes). This marker will agree in class with the class of the nominal which the number modifies, even if that nominal is not overtly expressed and is only apparent through pragmatic or discursive context, as in Vʕivʔev (four (males)). This is seen in the word 'four' itself as well as its derivatives.
