= Chabinaani =

Chabinaani ჩაბინაანი (Georgian)
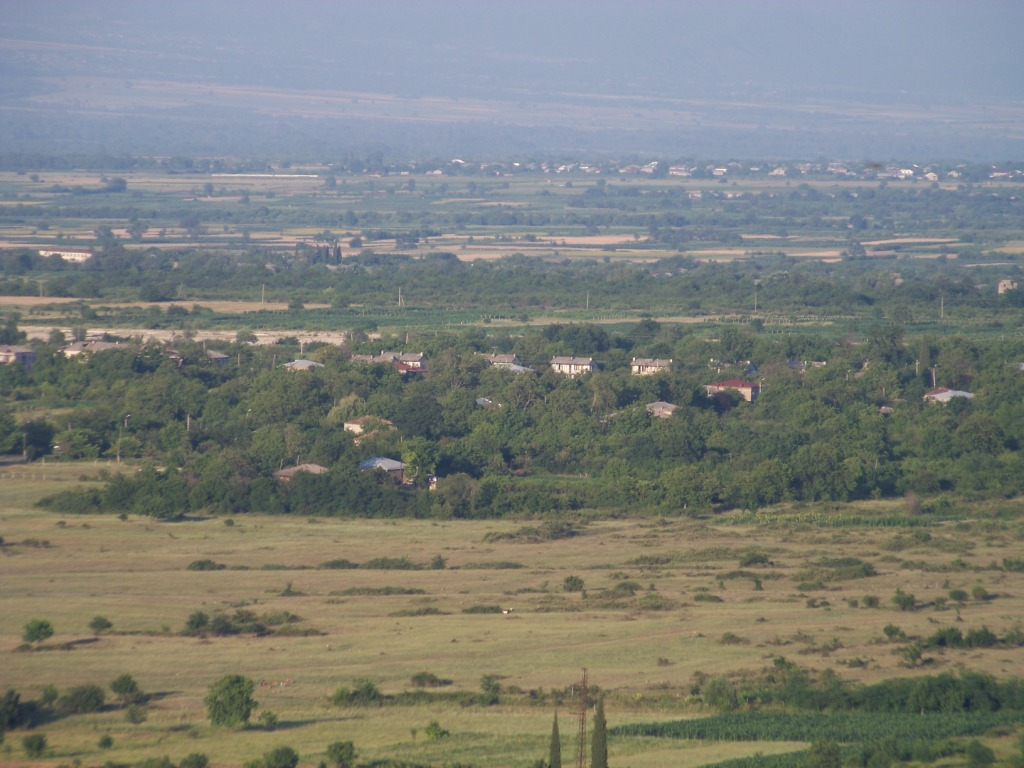

- Location within Georgia
- Coordinates: 41°58′20″N 45°20′16″E
- Country: Georgia
- Mkhare: Kakheti
- District: Akhmeta
- Elevation: 580 m (1,900 ft)

Population (2014)
  - Total: 143
- Time zone: UTC+4 (Georgian Time)

Chabinaani (Georgian: ჩაბინაანი) is a village in the Akhmeta Municipality (Zemo Khodasheni Community), Kakheti region, Georgia. It is situated on the left bank of the Khodashenikhevi River (a right tributary of the Alazani). The village lies at an elevation of 520 meters above sea level, 14 kilometers from Akhmeta.

According to the population census data of Georgia (2014), 143 people live in Chabinaani.
