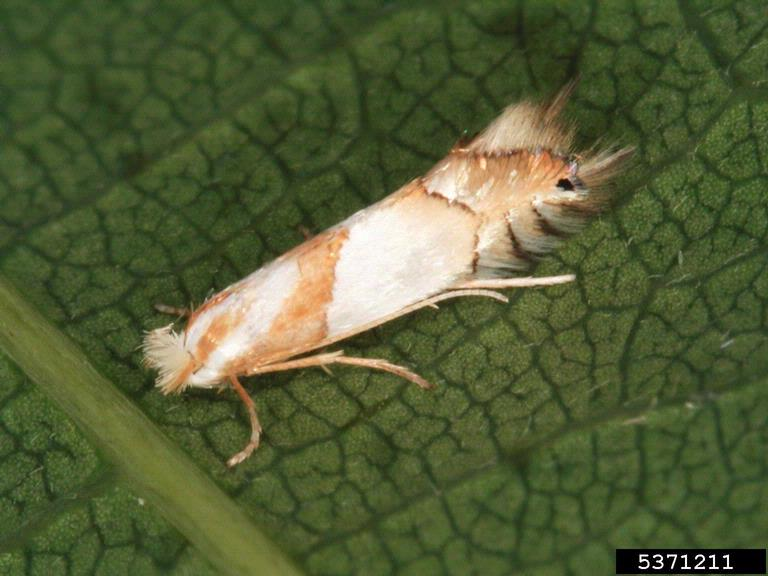

Scientific classification
- Kingdom: Animalia
- Phylum: Arthropoda
- Clade: Pancrustacea
- Class: Insecta
- Order: Lepidoptera
- Family: Gracillariidae
- Genus: Phyllonorycter
- Species: P. roboris

Binomial name
- Phyllonorycter roboris (Zeller, 1839)

Synonyms
- Lithocolletis roboris Zeller, 1839

= Phyllonorycter roboris =

Species of moth

Phyllonorycter roboris is a moth of the family Gracillariidae. It is found in all of Europe.

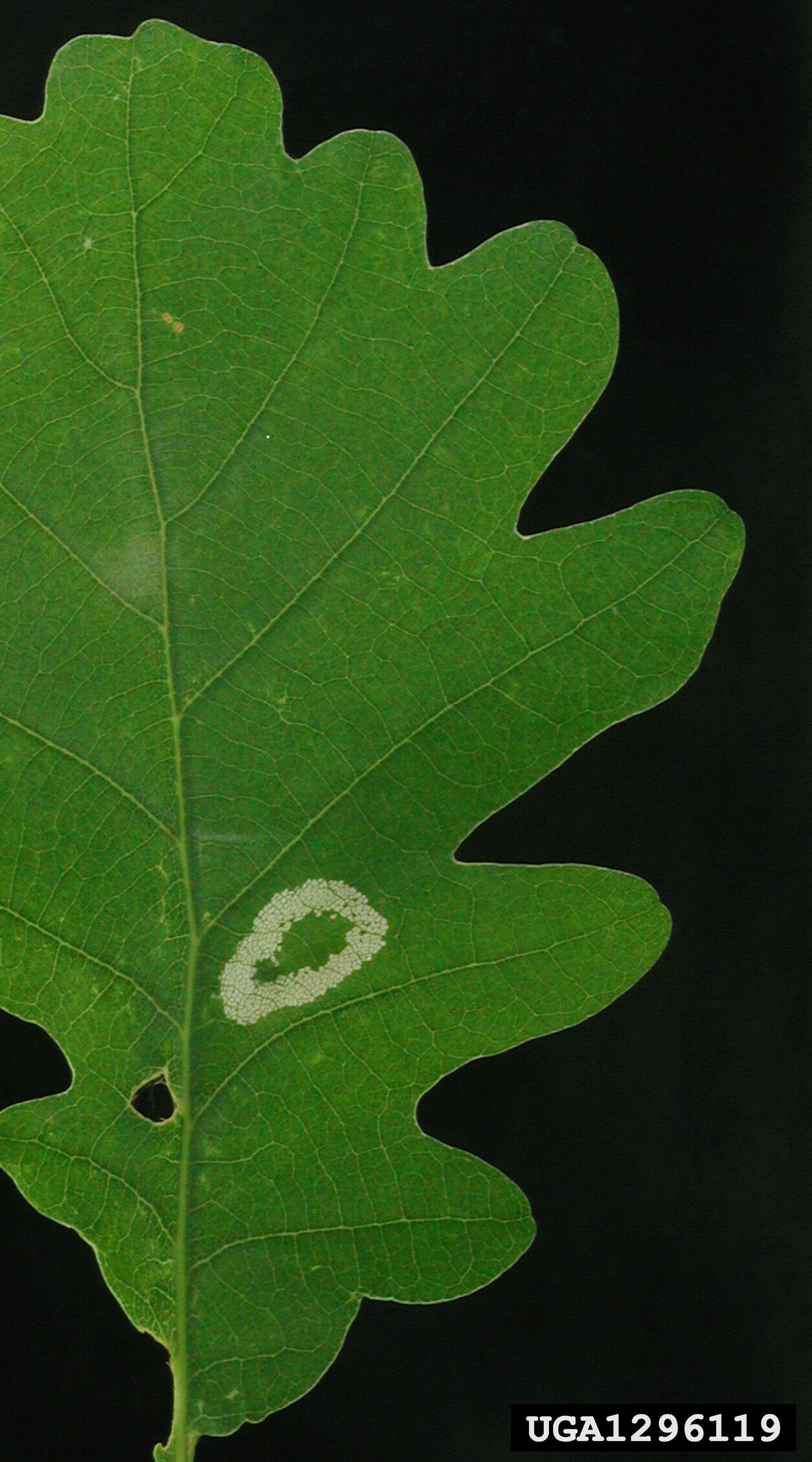
Damage

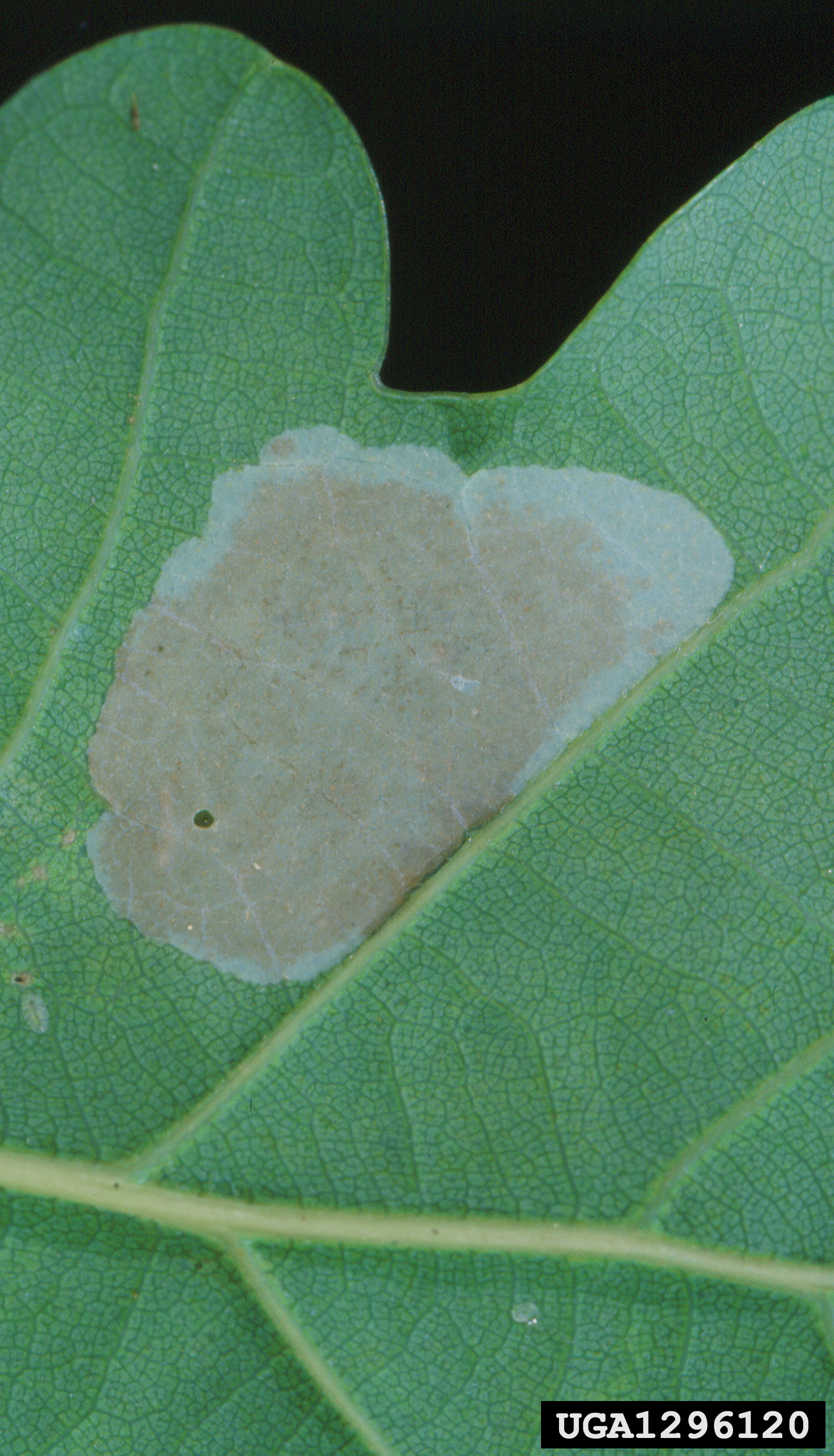
Damage

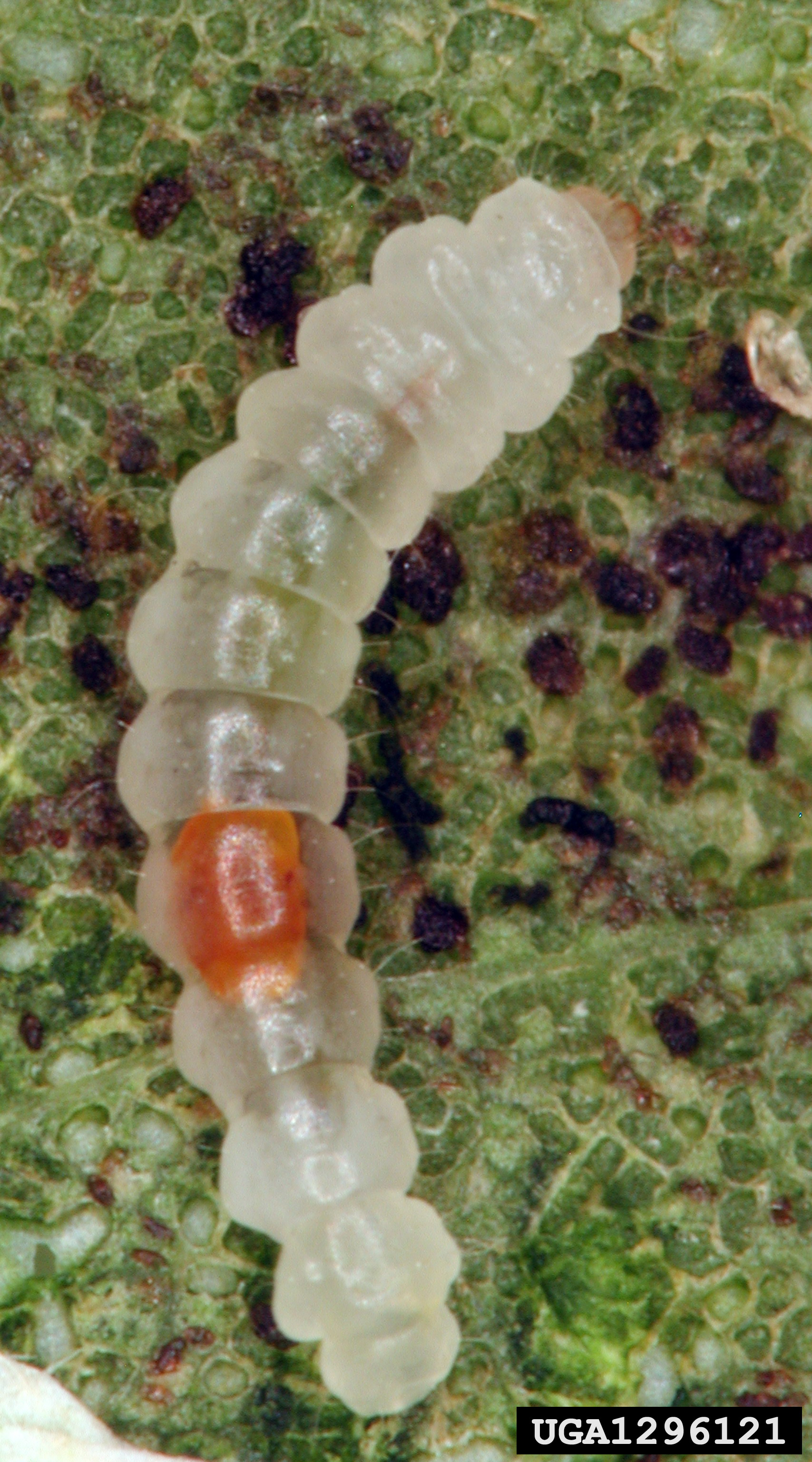
Larva

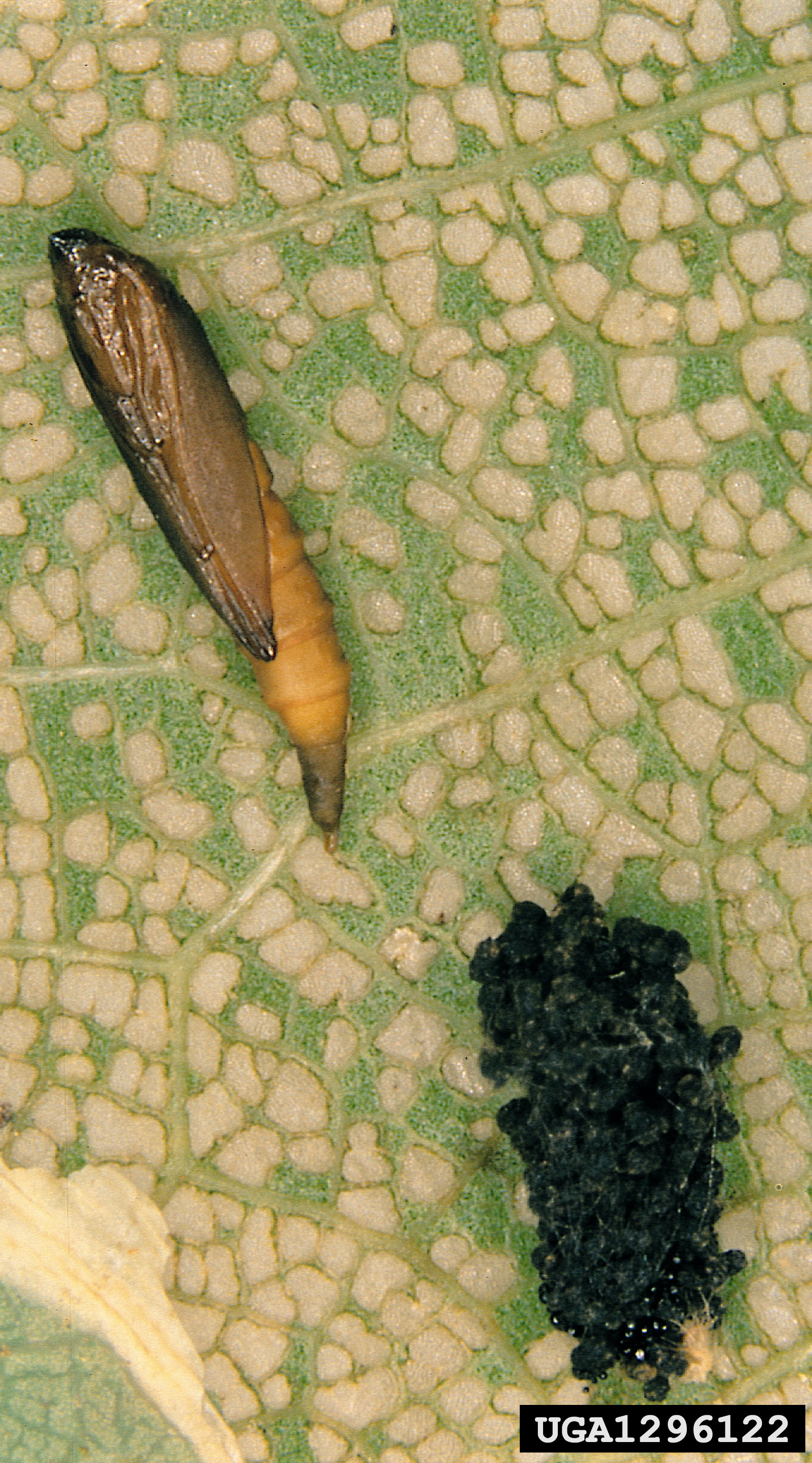
Pupa

The wingspan is 7–9 mm. The forewings are shining white; a very oblique golden-brown fascia from base of costa, broad above, posteriorly fuscous-edged; four dark fuscous costal strigulae towards apex, anteriorly edged with an ochreous tinge, first oblique and nearly meeting a similar dorsal strigula; a golden brown apical spot containing a black dot; a dark apical hook in cilia. Hindwings are grey.

Adults are on wing in June in one generation.

The larvae feed on Quercus cerris, Quercus dalechampii, Quercus faginea, Quercus frainetto, Quercus macrocarpa, Quercus pedunculiflora, Quercus petraea, Quercus polycarpa, Quercus pubescens and Quercus robur. They mine the leaves of their host plant.
