= Akhshani =

Akshani ახშანი (Georgian)
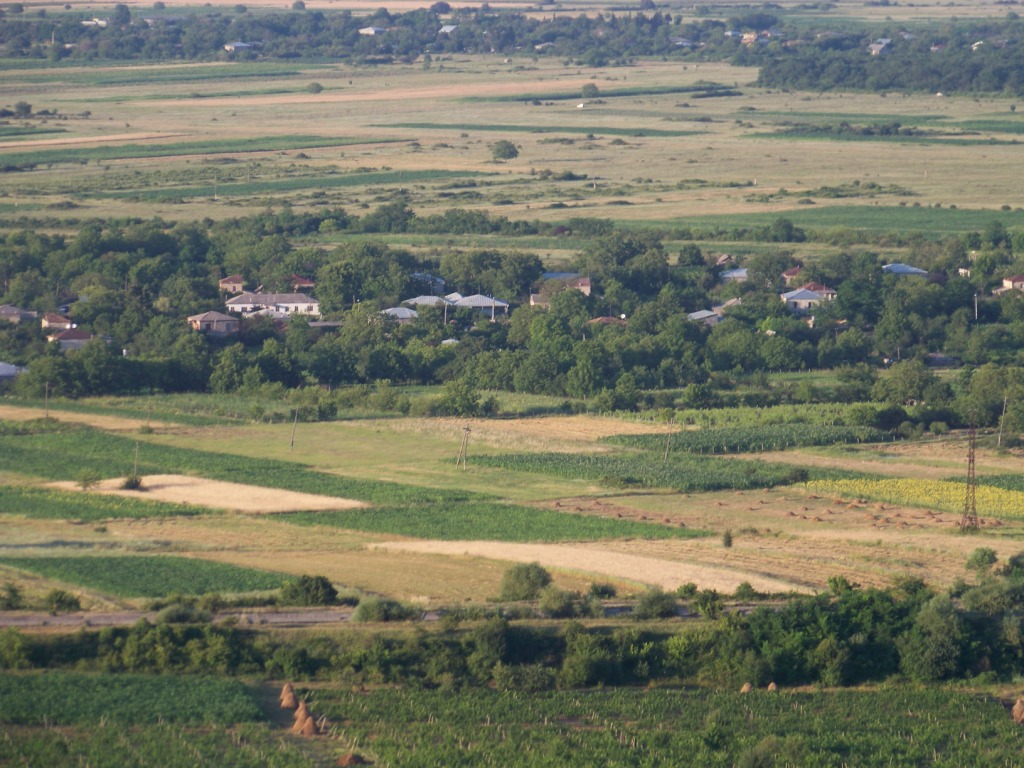

- Location within Georgia
- Coordinates: 41°59′04″N 45°18′51″E
- Country: Georgia
- Mkhare: Kakheti
- District: Akhmeta
- Elevation: 550 m (1,800 ft)

Population (2014)
  - Total: 236
- Time zone: UTC+4 (Georgian Time)

Akhshani (Georgian: ახშანი) is a village in the Akhmeta Municipality (Kistauri Community), Kakheti region, Georgia. It is situated on the Alazani Valley, on the Ghurula River (a right tributary of the Alazani), along the Telavi-Akhmeta road. The village lies at an elevation of 550 meters above sea level, 11 kilometers from Akhmeta.

== Demographics ==
According to the population census data of Georgia (2014), 236 people live in Akhshani.

== Notable sites ==
The Gorisjvari Church of Akhshani, a three-nave basilica from the second half of the 9th century, is located 1 kilometer from the village. The complex includes a bell tower and a wall. The basilica is built of tuff stone, with shale stone used sporadically, and has been repaired with brick. The bell tower, the western wall paintings, and fragments of decoration are believed to date from the 15th–16th centuries.

== Gallery ==
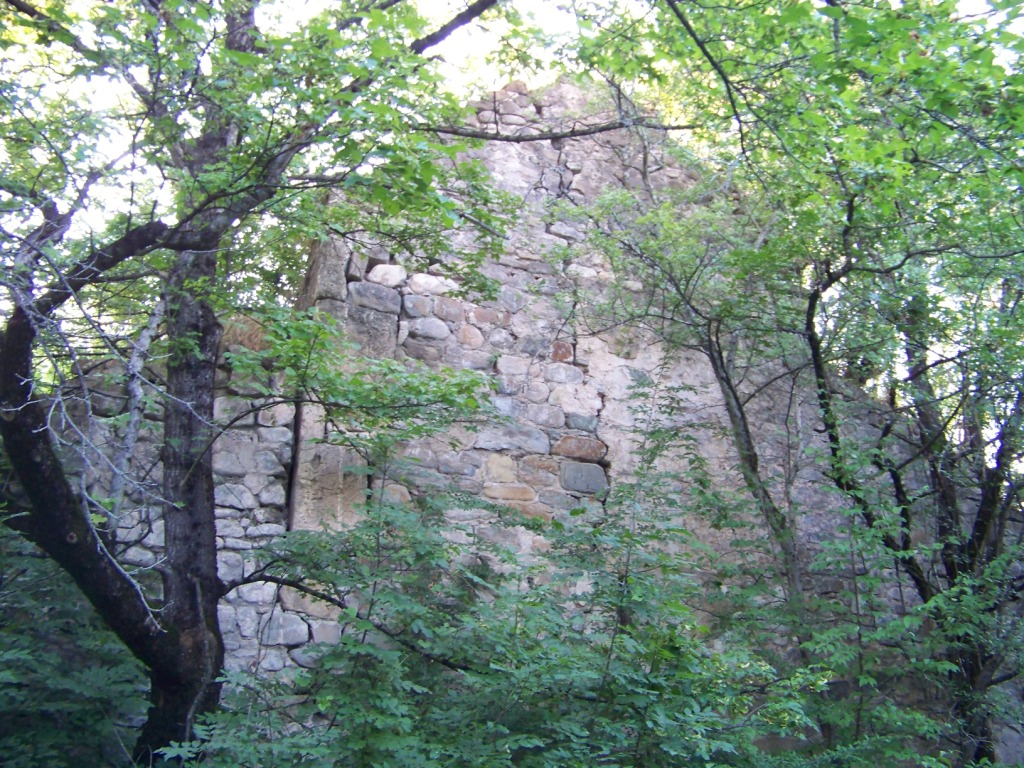

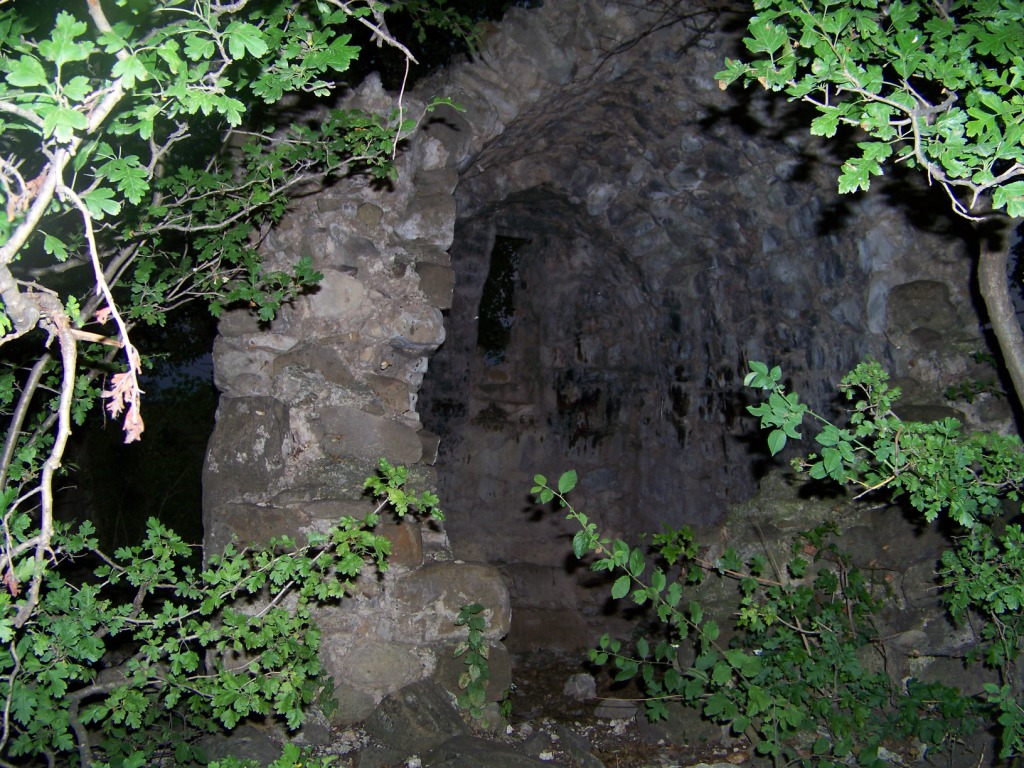

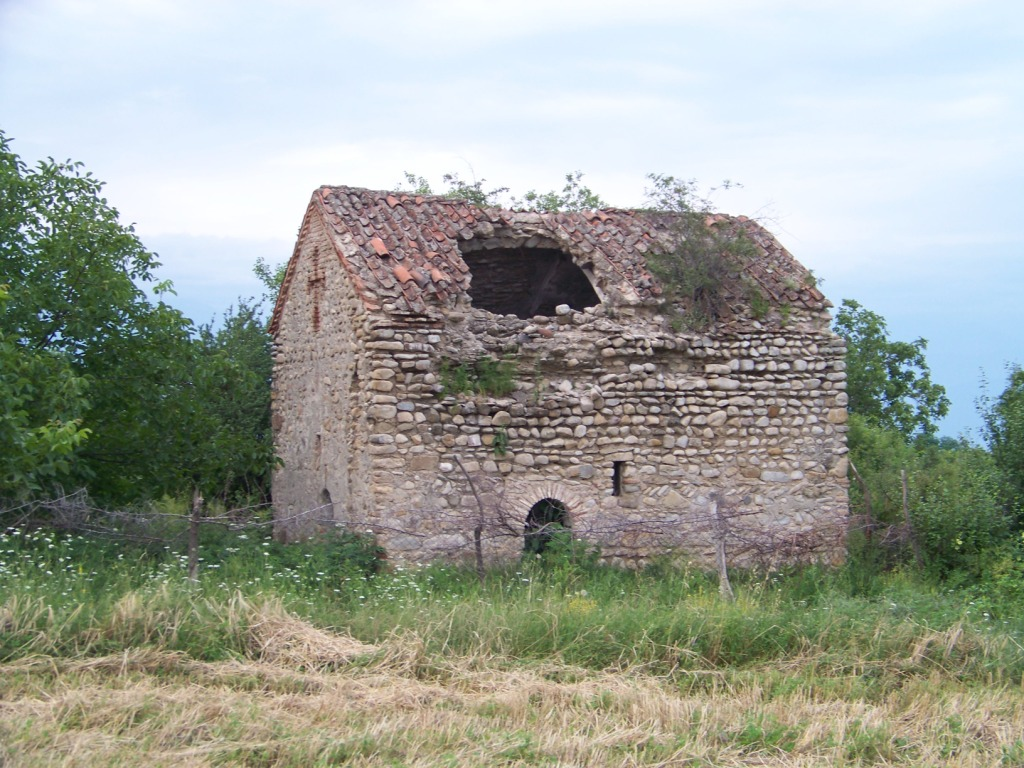

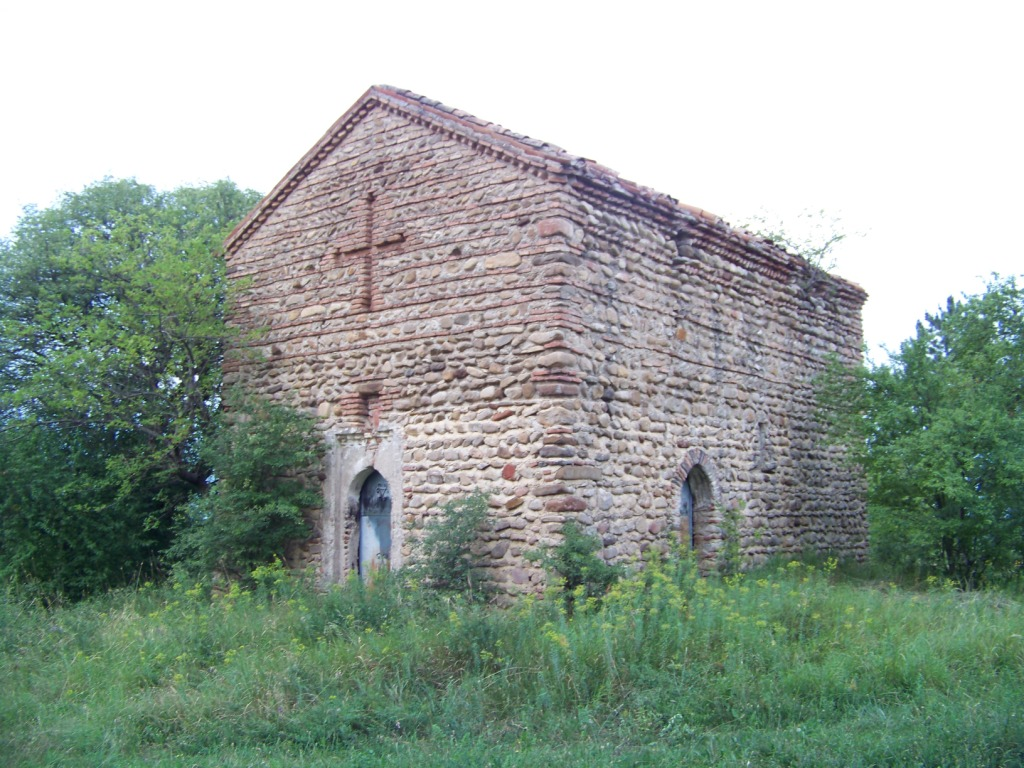

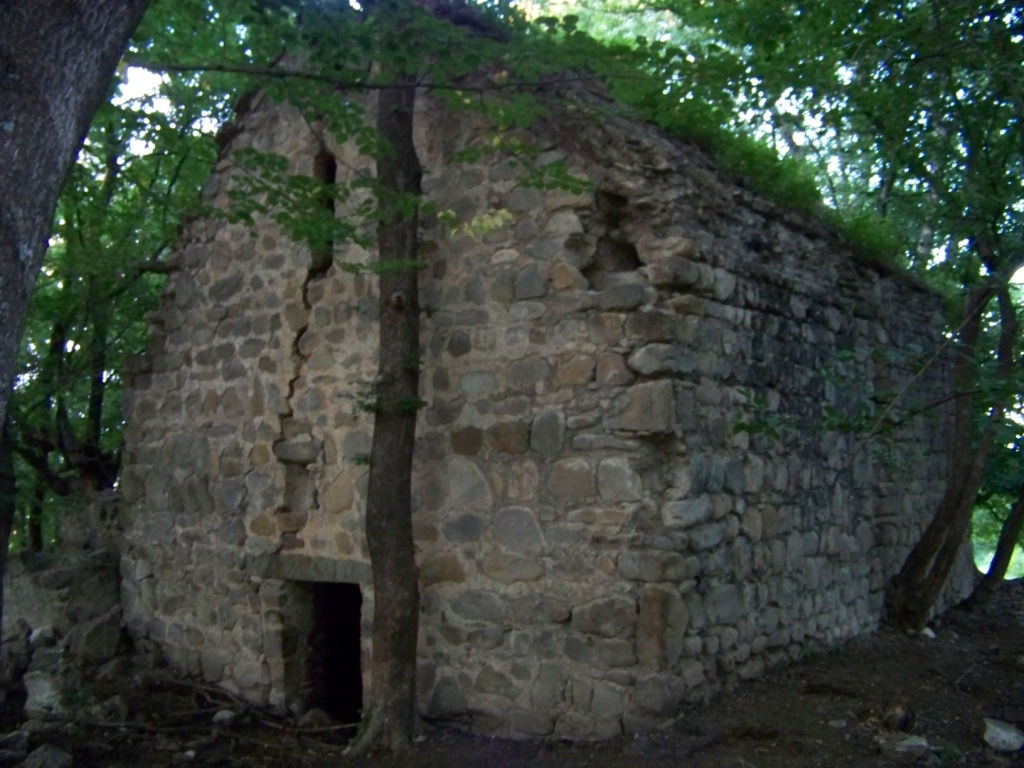

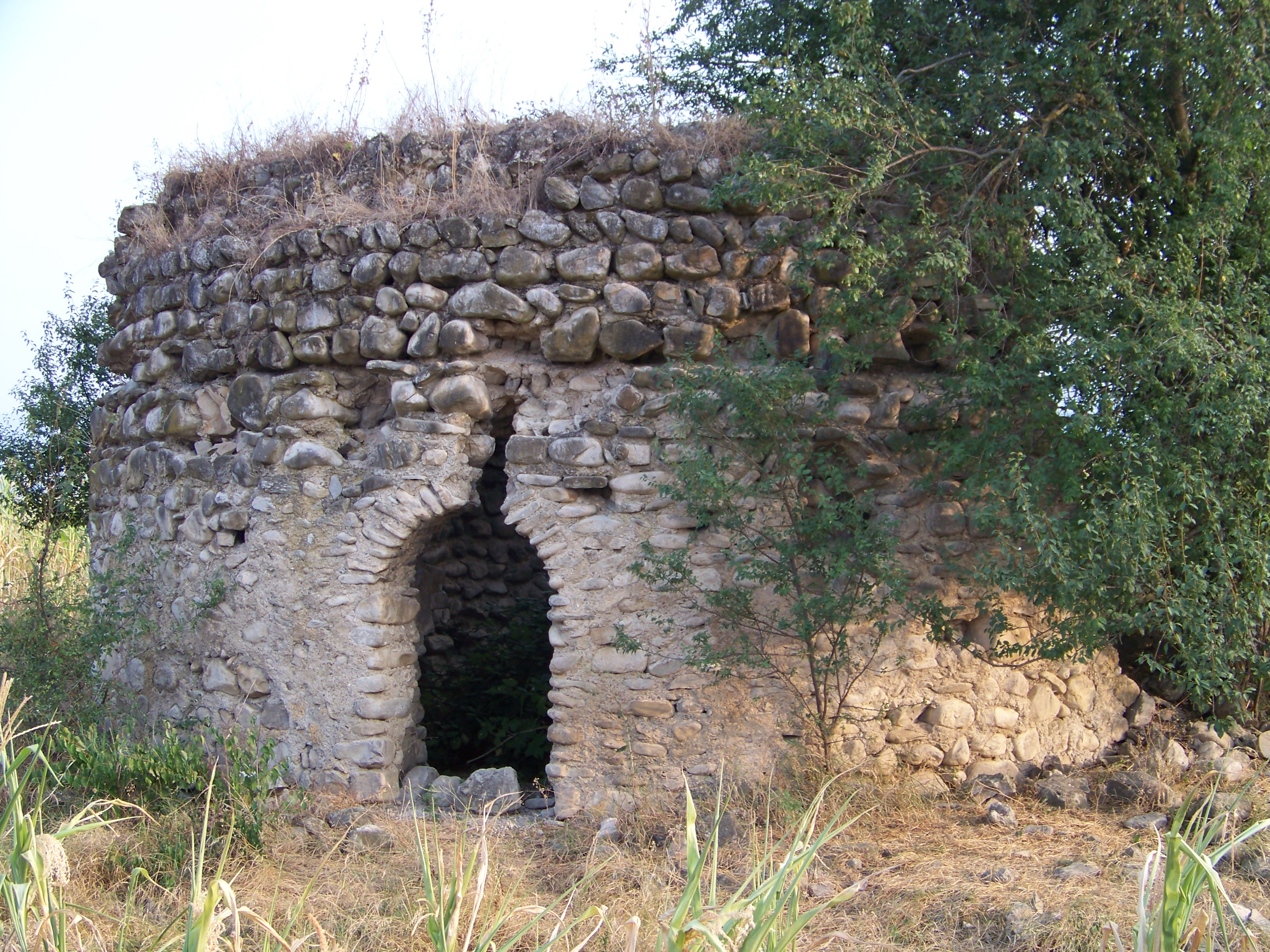

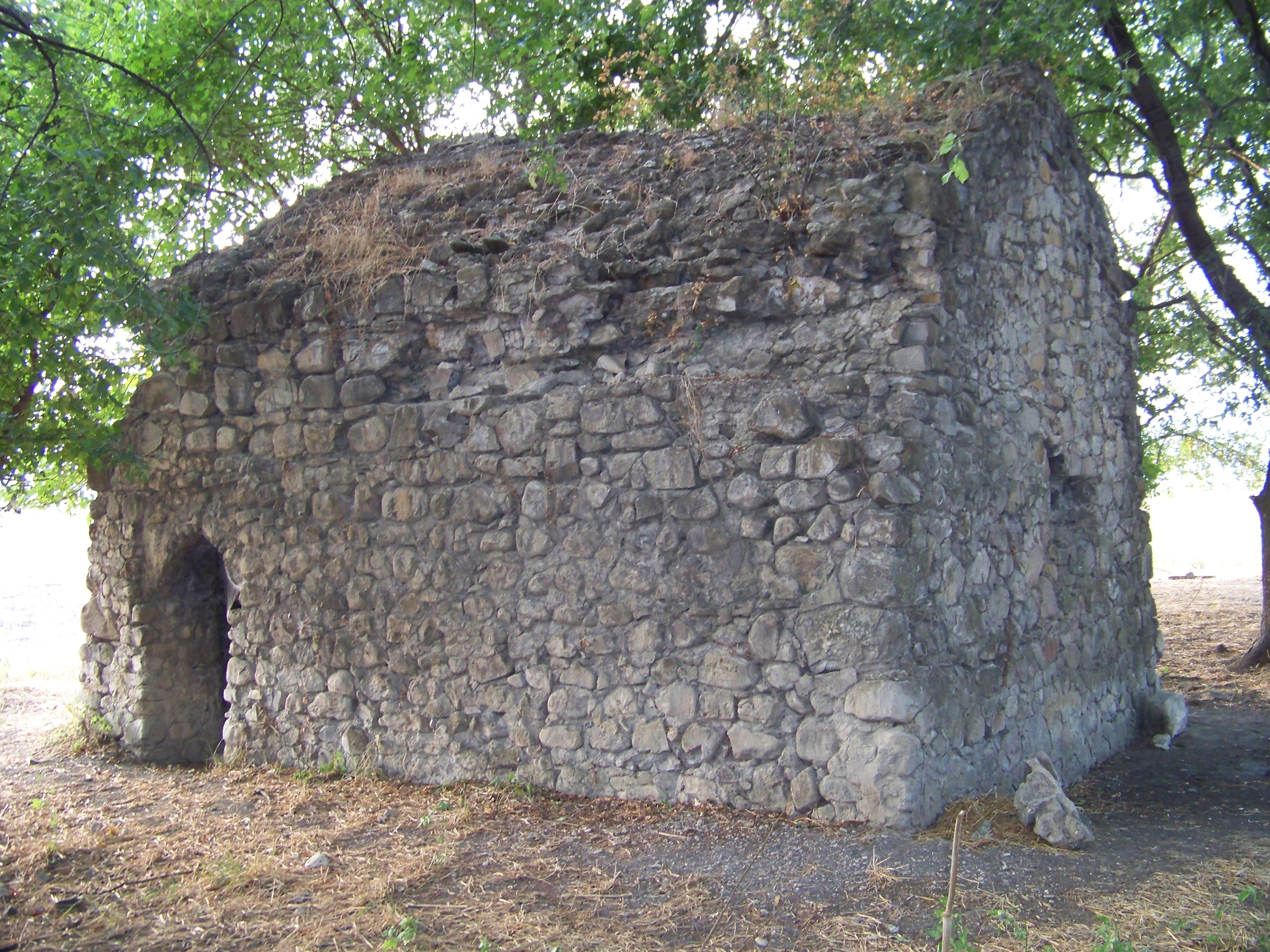

== See also ==
- Kistauri

== Bibliography ==
- (in Georgian) GSE, (1977) volume II, page 110, Tbilisi.
