= Ilto Managed Reserve =

Protected nature area in Georgia

- Georgian: ილტოს აღკვეთილი
- IUCN category IV (habitat/species management area)
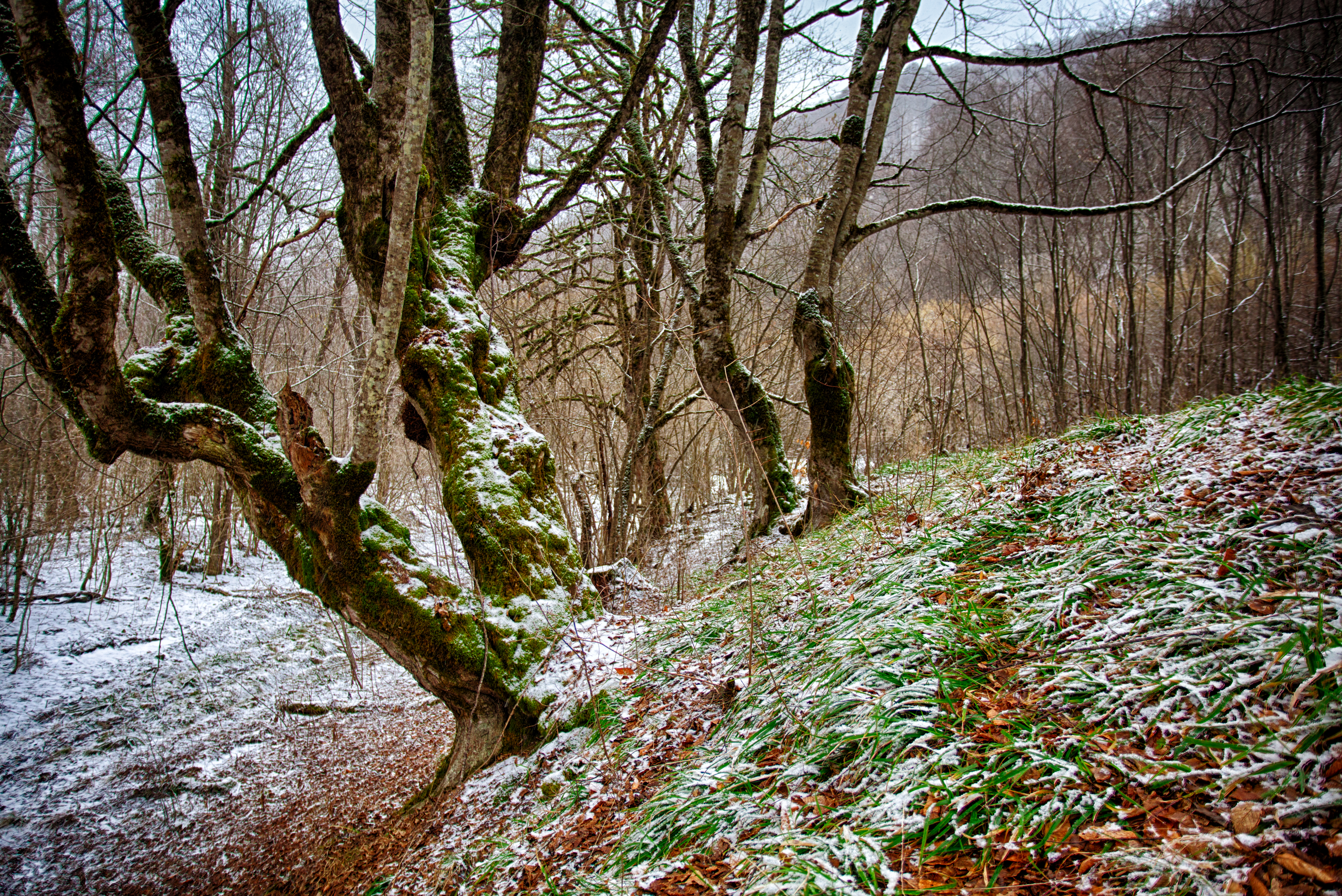
- Ilto Managed Reserve

- Location within Georgia Location within Kakheti
- Location: Georgia
- Nearest city: Akhmeta
- Coordinates: 42°16′16″N 45°10′08″E
- Area: 69.71 km^{2} (26.92 sq mi)
- Established: 2003
- Governing body: Agency of Protected Areas
- Website: Batsara-Babaneuri Protected Areas

Ilto Managed Reserve (Georgian: ილტოს აღკვეთილი) is a protected area in Akhmeta Municipality in Kakheti region of Georgia.

Ilto Managed Reserve is part of Batsara-Babaneuri Protected Areas which also includes Batsara Strict Nature Reserve and Babaneuri Strict Nature Reserve.

Ilto Managed Reserve includes the parts of the head of Ilto valley. It borders Batsara Strict Nature Reserve located in Pankisi Gorge to the east.

Ilto Managed Reserve was established in order to protect and restore precious wood species and characteristic fauna.

== Fauna ==
Birds that are common in area include buzzard, hawk, Eurasian sparrowhawk, eagle. Rarely bearded vulture has been observed also. Mammal species are represented by hedgehogs, martens, rabbits, badgers, jackals, foxes, wolves, wild boar, bear, deer, lynx and chamois. The otter is rather rare.

== See also ==
- Batsara Strict Nature Reserve
