= Babaneuri Strict Nature Reserve =

Protected area in Kakheti, Georgia

- IUCN category Ia (strict nature reserve)
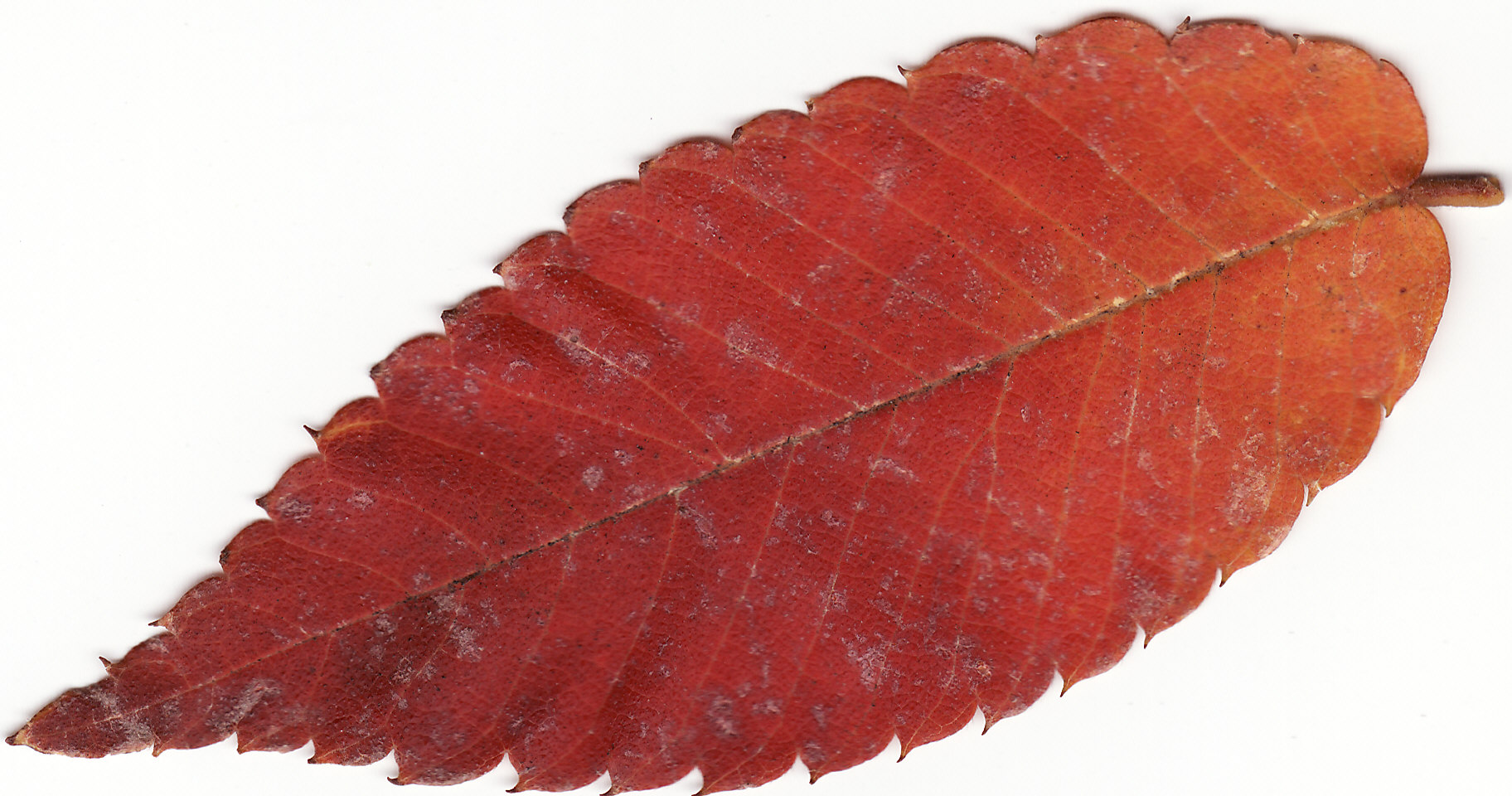
- Zelkova leaf.

- Location within Georgia Location within Kakheti
- Location: Georgia
- Nearest city: village Babaneuri
- Coordinates: 42°05′15″N 45°23′55″E
- Area: 15.16 km^{2} (5.85 sq mi)
- Established: 2003
- Governing body: Agency of Protected Areas
- Website: Batsara-Babaneuri Protected Areas

Babaneuri Strict Nature Reserve (Georgian: ბაბანეურის სახელმწიფო ნაკრძალი) is a protected area in Akhmeta Municipality, Kakheti region of Georgia on the bank of Alazani River, 439–985 meters above sea level.

The Nature Reserve is located at the foot of the Greater Caucasus in the vicinity of villages Babaneuri and Argoq, it also includes the Batsara-Babaneuri Protected Areas. The main objective is to protect up to 240 ha of zelkova (Zelkova carpinifolia) grove, trees that are featured in Regional Red List of Georgia.

Babaneuri Strict Nature Reserve is part of Batsara-Babaneuri Protected Areas which also includes Batsara Strict Nature Reserve and Ilto Managed Reserve.

== Flora ==
The Nature Reserve has the largest grove of the rarest plant in Georgia - the Caucasian zelkova - a tree that has survived from the Tertiary period and was considered to have already disappeared from the face of the earth, but in 1946 it was rediscovered on the banks of the Alazani.

These relict trees can reach height of 30 m with a trunk diameter of 90 cm. The Georgian oak, the field maple and the other are mixed together. The undergrowth is represented by hawthorn, privet, medlar, privet and wild rose.

== Fauna ==
Numerous songbirds spend winter in a preserved grove. A variety of mammals also live here: stone marten, roe deer, rabbits, foxes and others.
