= Dartlo church =

Georgian church

Coordinates: 42.4376°N 45.5827°E

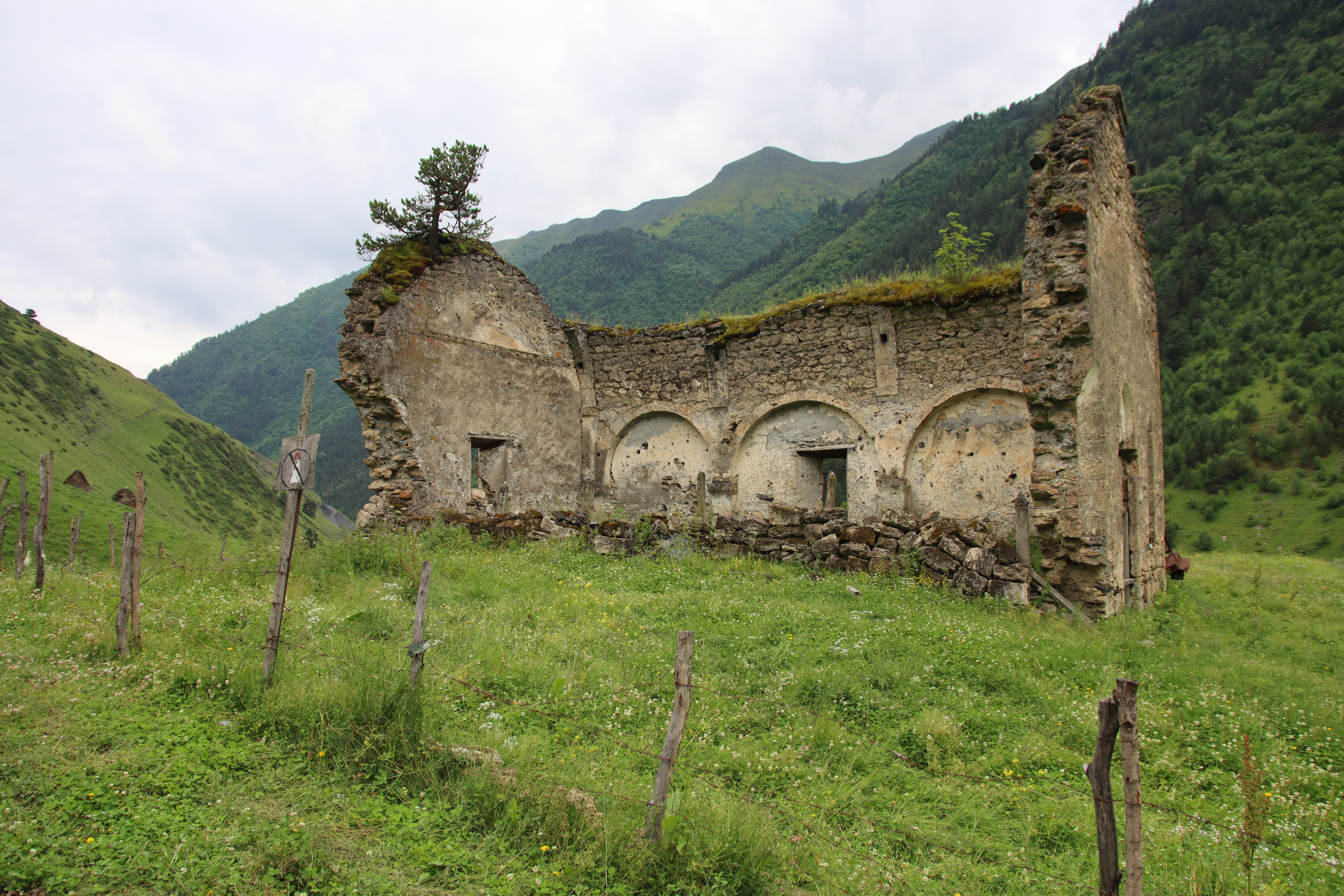
Dartlo church

The Dartlo church (Georgian: დართლოს ეკლესია, romanized: dartlos ek'lesia) is a church located on the outskirts of the town of Dartlo, in the municipality of Akhmeta. The Church has the status of a Monument of National Importance. It is currently under restoration and is expected to be active again.

== Architecture ==
The church of Dartlo is a hall church (12.5 X 8.5 m). It was built with sandstone during the 19th century. The structure of the church is very damaged currently.

The entrance, a rectangular door, is to the west. On the wall there is a large and high rectangular window. Another window cut in the middle of the south wall of the church is relatively low. On the south wall there are two pairs of pilasters, with simple arches embedded in the arches of the wall.
