= Barbare Jorjadze =

Princess Barbare Eristavi-Jorjadze
- Born: 1833; Kistauri
- Died: 1895 (aged 61–62)
- Notable work: Georgian Cuisine and Tried Housekeeping Notes, "A Few Words to the Attention of Young Men"
- Spouse: Zakaria Jorjadze
- Father: Prince Davit Eristavi

Barbare Jorjadze (Georgian: ბარბარე ჯორჯაძე; 1833-1895), also known as Barbare Eristavi-Jorjadze, was a Georgian princess, author, and women's rights advocate.

== Background ==
Jorjadze was born in Kistauri, Georgia in 1833 and the daughter of Prince Davit Eristavi. She was married to Zakaria Jorjadze when she was 12. Her brother was the poet and historian Rapiel Eristavi.

== Writing ==
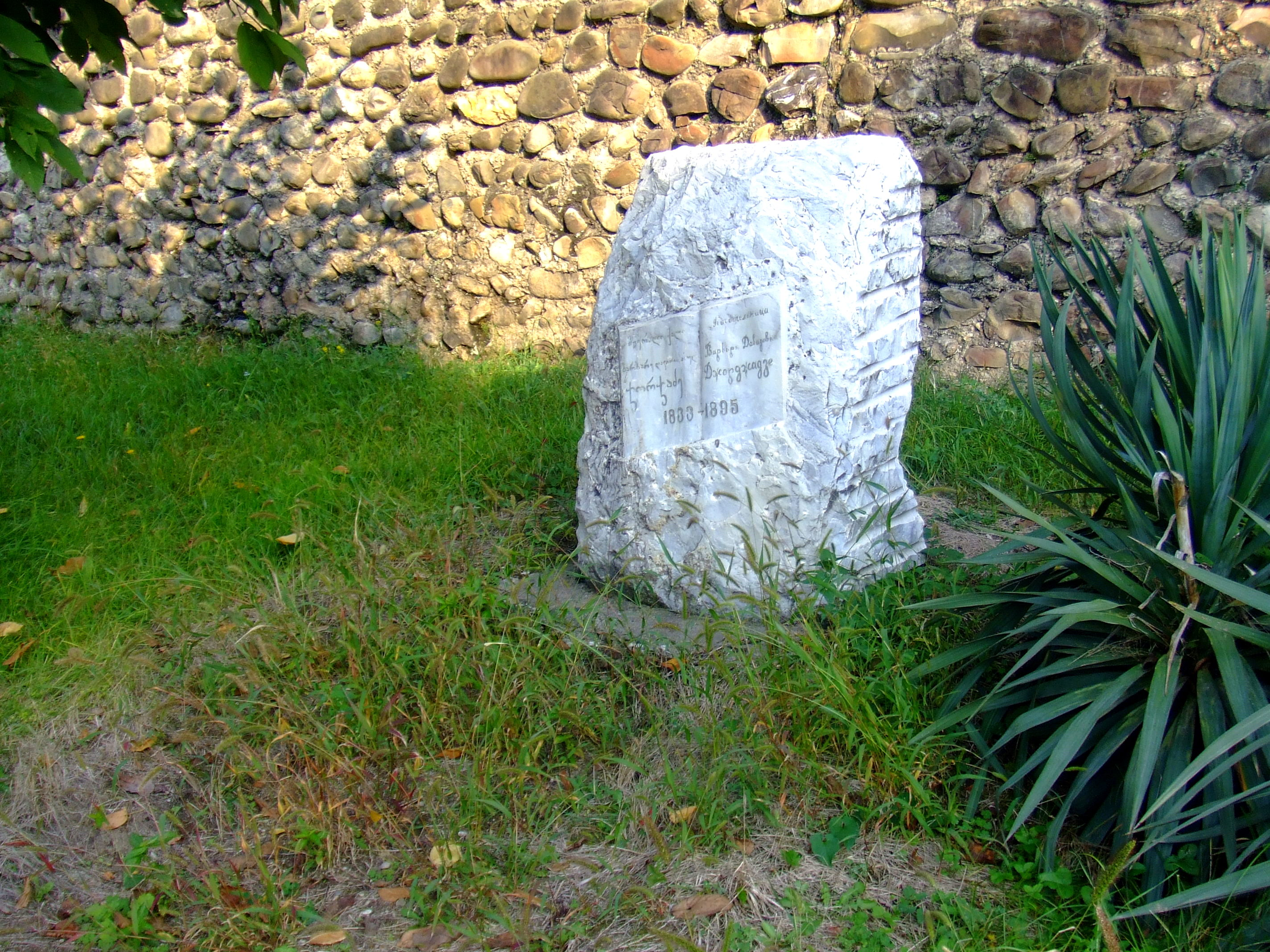
Barbare Jorjadze's tomb in the yard of the Giorgi Chubinashvili Telavi State History and Ethnography Museum

Considered Georgia's first feminist, Jorjadze was a poet, playwright and essayist. She began writing in 1858, publishing poetry in Tsiskari magazine. Despite public criticism, she continued publishing, including in newspapers and magazines such as Droeba, Iveria, Kvali, and Jejili.

In 1861 she was vocal in debates around the modernization of the Georgian language, specifically challenging the ideas of Ilia Chavchavadze.

Jorjadze's play, What I was looking for and what I found, was first staged in 1867 at the Kutaisi Theatre. It was performed for several years and various other theatres.

In 1874 she published the cookbook, Georgian Cuisine and Tried Housekeeping Notes. Published by Ekvtime Kheladze's printing house, it collected recipes for both Georgian and European dishes. Many of her recipes are considered to be standard practice for preparation of traditional Georgian dishes and the book continues to be popular.

Jorjadze penned the letter "A Few of Words to the Attention of Young Men" which was published in 1893 in Kvali magazine. Addressing women's rights, it is considered to be a manifesto of Georgian feminism.

In 2017 the National Parliamentary Library of Georgia named a reading room after Jorjadze. The room also contains murals by Anuk Beluga, depicting Jorjadze and other Georgian female writers and activists.

== See also ==
- Elizabeth Orbeliani
- Anastasia Tumanishvili-Tsereteli
- Ekaterine Gabashvili
- Olga Guramishvili-Nikoladze
- List of Georgian women writers
