= Batsara Strict Nature Reserve =

Protected nature area in Georgia (country)

- IUCN category Ia (strict nature reserve)
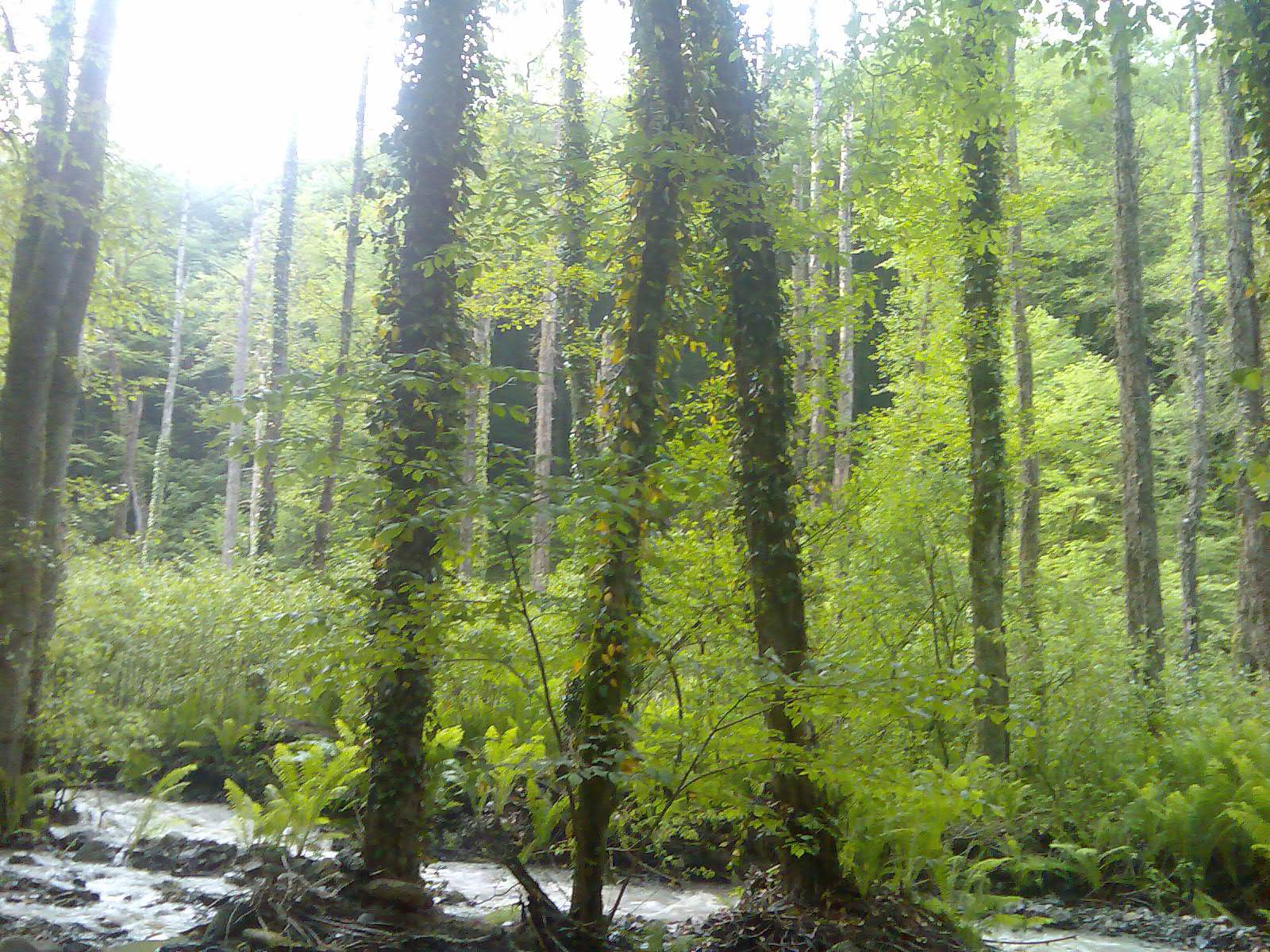
- Batsara Strict Nature Reserve

- Location within Georgia Location within Kakheti
- Location: Georgia
- Coordinates: 42°14′41″N 45°15′06″E
- Area: 55.48 km^{2} (21.42 sq mi)
- Established: 2003
- Governing body: Agency of Protected Areas
- Website: Batsara-Babaneuri Protected Areas

Batsara Strict Nature Reserve (Georgian: ბაწარის სახელმწიფო ნაკრძალი) is a protected area in Akhmeta Municipality, Kakheti region of Georgia in Pankisi Gorge on the bank of Alazani River, 700–2,000 meters above sea level at the foot of the Greater Caucasus. It borders with Ilto Managed Reserve which includes part of Ilto valley.

== History ==
Batsara State Nature Reserve was first created in 1935 in river Batsara gorge, the right tributary of river Alazani.

Batsara Strict Nature Reserve is part of Batsara-Babaneuri Protected Areas which also includes Babaneuri Strict Nature Reserve and Ilto Managed Reserve.

== Flora ==
In central area of Batsara gorge there are remains of relict dendroflora from tertiary period. About 270 ha is covered with yew (Taxus baccata) forests, which is the largest yew forest in the world. Yew grows as a separate grove, and interspersed with maple, ash, linden and other trees.

== Fauna ==
Large variety of birds — vultures, eagles, grouse — are preserved in grove. A variety of mammals also live here: bears, chamois, foxes, roe deer, rabbits, martens, badgers and others.

== See also ==
- Ilto Managed Reserve
- Taxus baccata
