= Poetry of Joseph Stalin =

Poetry by the Soviet leader Joseph Stalin

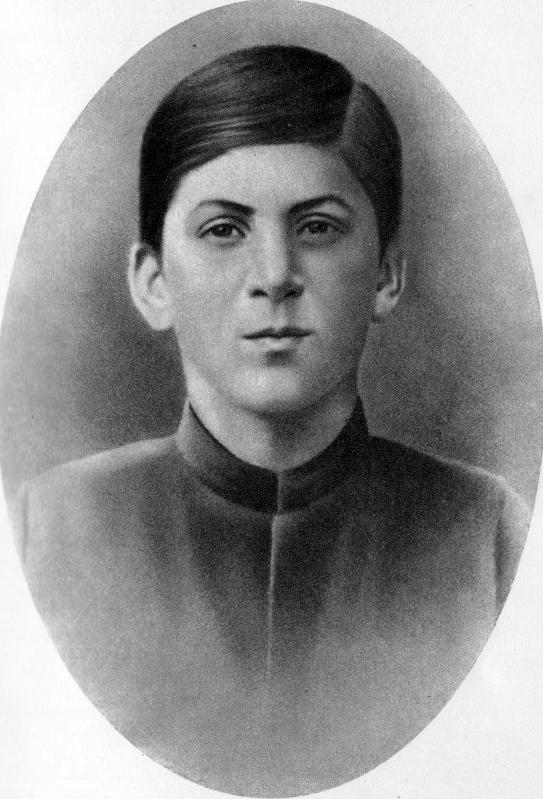
Stalin in 1894, the year he enrolled in the Orthodox Seminary in Tiflis

Joseph Stalin wrote poetry in his youth before becoming a Bolshevik revolutionary and the leader of the Soviet Union.

== Literary career ==
Like many Georgian children, Ioseb Besarionis dze Jughashvili – who would later call himself Stalin – grew up with the national epic, The Knight in the Panther's Skin. As a child, Jughashvili knew the poem by heart and passionately read the other popular poems of the time, notably those by Raphael Eristavi, Akaki Tsereteli and – once he learned Russian – Nikolay Nekrasov.

At the Orthodox Seminary of Tiflis, where he was enrolled beginning in 1894, Jughashvili read Goethe and Shakespeare in translation, and could recite Walt Whitman. He also started writing Romantic poetry in Georgian. In 1895, at the age of 17, Jughashvili's work impressed the noted poet Ilia Chavchavadze, who published five of them in his journal, Iveria, attributed to the pseudonym Soselo.

One of these poems, "Morning" (dedicated to Prince Raphael Eristavi), begins:

"The pinkish bud has opened,
Rushing to the pale-blue violet
And, stirred by a light breeze,
The lily of the valley has bent over the grass."

Once Jughashvili entered revolutionary politics, and became Stalin, he stopped writing poetry regularly, telling a friend it took too much time.

In 1907 he used his prestige as Soselo to obtain information from an admirer needed for a bank robbery. During the Great Purge, he edited a Russian translation of the Knight in the Panther's Skin (by a Georgian intellectual he released from prison for that purpose) and competently translated some of the couplets himself.

Stalin published all of his work anonymously and never publicly acknowledged it. When Lavrentiy Beria secretly had Boris Pasternak and other noted translators prepare a Russian edition of Stalin's poems for the ruler's 70th birthday in 1949, Stalin had the project stopped.

== Reception ==
In his biography of Stalin, Simon Sebag Montefiore notes that the poems in Iveria "were widely read and much admired. They became minor Georgian classics, to be published in anthologies and memorised by schoolchildren until the 1970s (and not as part of Stalin's cult; they were usually published as 'Anonymous')." Montefiore adds that "their romantic imagery was derivative but their beauty lay in the delicacy and purity of rhyme and language".

Robert Service, another Stalin biographer, describes the poems as "fairly standard for early 19th-century Romantic poetry", and as "very conventional, ... very standardized and rather self-indulgent".

Stalin's poems have been translated into English by Donald Rayfield.
