= Zemo Khodasheni =

Zemo Khodasheni ზემო ხოდაშენი (Georgian)
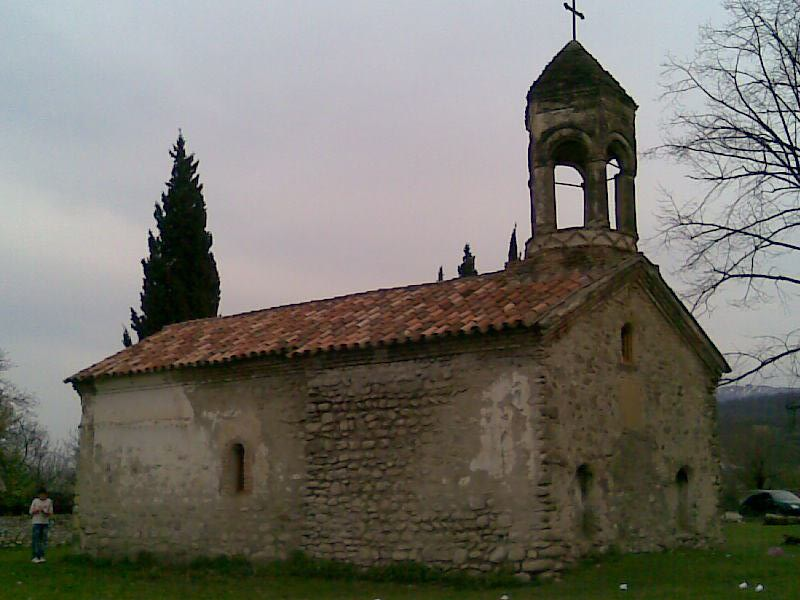

- Location within Georgia
- Coordinates: 41°57′35″N 45°20′59″E
- Country: Georgia
- Mkhare: Kakheti
- District: Akhmeta
- Elevation: 580 m (1,900 ft)

Population (2014)
  - Total: 868
- Time zone: UTC+4 (Georgian Time)

Zemo Khodasheni (Georgian: ზემო ხოდაშენი) is a village in the Akhmeta Municipality, Kakheti region, Georgia. It is situated on the Alazani Valley, on the right bank of the Alazani River. It serves as a community center (for the villages of Atskuri, Akhaldaba, Chabinaani, Charekauli, Khveliandro, and Khorkheli). The village is situated at an elevation of 580 meters above sea level, 15 kilometers from Akhmeta. The historic name is Badagoni. The village is home to the Badagoni winery.

According to the population census data of Georgia (2014), 868 people live in Zemo Khodasheni.
