= Duisi =

Duisi Georgian: დუისი, Chechen: Дуй-Юрт
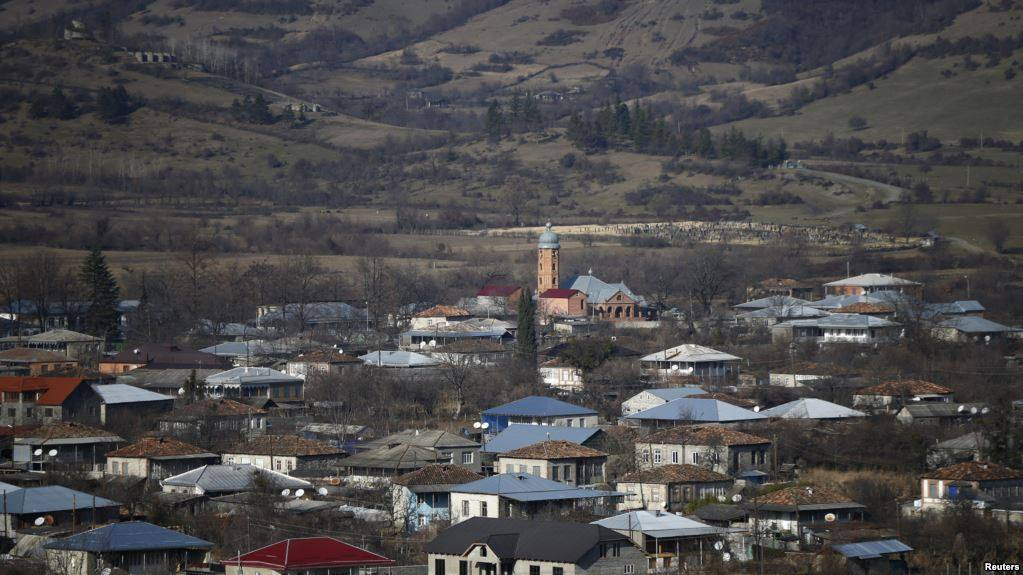

- Location in Georgia
- Coordinates: 42°08′44″N 45°17′38″E
- Country: Georgia
- Region: Kakheti
- Municipality: Akhmeta
- Elevation: 640 m (2,100 ft)

Population (2014)
  - Total: 2,354
- Time zone: UTC+4
- Postal code: 0901
- Area code: +995

Duisi (Georgian: დუისი, Chechen: Дуй-Юрт, romanized: Dui-Yurt) is a village in Akhmeta Municipality, Georgia. It is situated in the Pankisi Gorge, on the banks of the Alazani river. It is located 640 meters above sea level and 17 kilometers from the city of Akhmeta. In 2014, according to census data, there were 2,354 people living in the village, of whom 2,206 (93.71%) were Kists.

Duisi is home to a number of monuments and landmark buildings, including the Amphitheatre and the Old Mosque. The Old Mosque was first completed in 1901 and renovated in 2021.

== Notable people ==
- Zelimkhan Khangoshvili (1979–2019), Chechen soldier

== Bibliography ==
(in Georgian) ქართული საბჭოთა ენციკლოპედია (Georgian Soviet Encyclopedia), vol. 3, pg. 650, Tbilisi, 1978.
