= Ageurta =

Village in Akhmeta, Georgia

Ageurta is a historical village located at the Akhmeta Municipality, in the Kakheti region, Georgia. It is located in the territory of Ajmeta, in the mountainous historical region of Tusheti, 9 km from Omalo.

In 2018, along with nine other Tusheti villages, it was granted the status of a Cultural Monument of National Importance of Georgia.

Located on a slope, the village consists of about twenty residential towers, many of which are in ruins. At present, there are only four towers without significant losses. One of the towers has six floors, but they are so damaged that they are on the verge of collapse. The floor coverings of four other towers were made of wood (the remains of the pedestal structure are still preserved).

== Restructuring ==
In 2018, Giorgi Kvirikashvili, Prime Minister of Georgia, revealed plans for rehabilitation work on 10-point towers and castles in the Tusheti region, considered cultural heritage, included Ageurta. It is planned to start with the inventory of the structures, to subsequently continue with the restructuring planning.

== Literature ==
Description of Georgian Monuments of History and Culture, vol. 2, p. 44-45, Tb., 2008.
