= Dartlo =

Dartlo დართლო
- Village
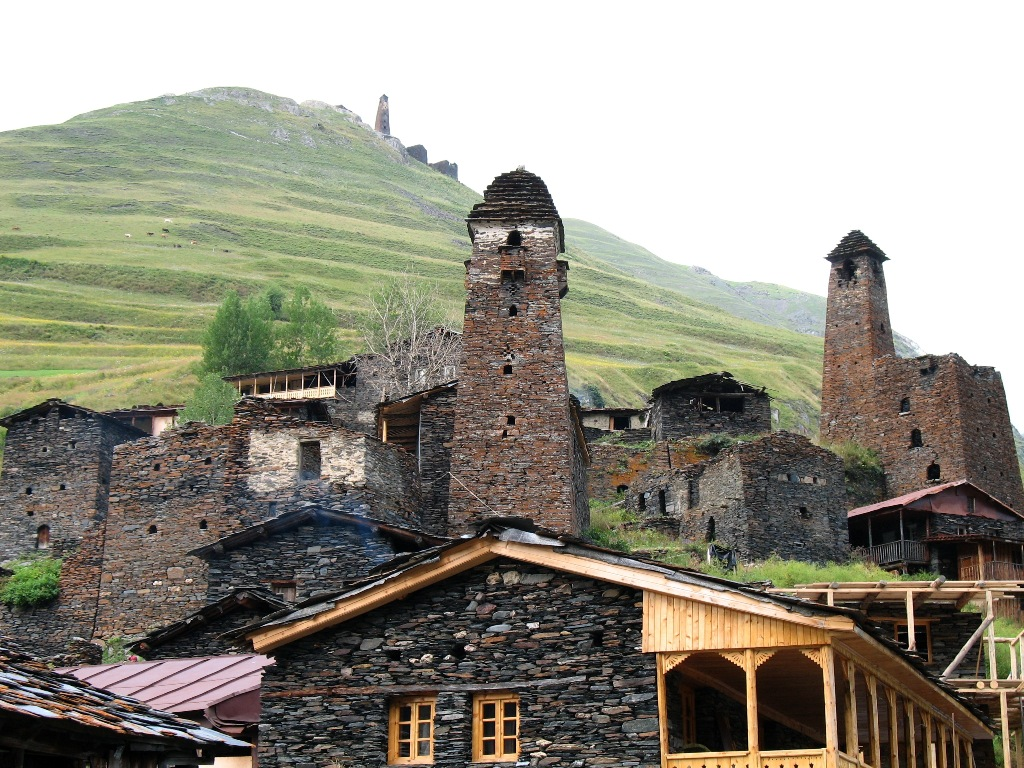

- Location of Dartlo
- Coordinates: 42°26′22″N 45°34′52″E
- Country: Georgia
- Region: Kakheti
- Municipality: Akhmeta
- Elevation: 2,000 m (6,600 ft)

Population (2014)
  - Total: 0
- Time zone: UTC+4 (Georgian Time)

Dartlo (Georgian: დართლო) is a village in the Akhmeta Municipality, Kakheti Region, Georgia.

The village is known for its historic stone towers and houses, and the Dartlo church.

Dartlo is part of the historical region of Tusheti and is located about 12km from Omalo, the main village of the region.

== Population ==
As of the 2014 national census, Dartlo had 0 permanent residents, down from 9 in 2002.

Population	2002 census	2014 census
Total	9	0

== Gallery ==
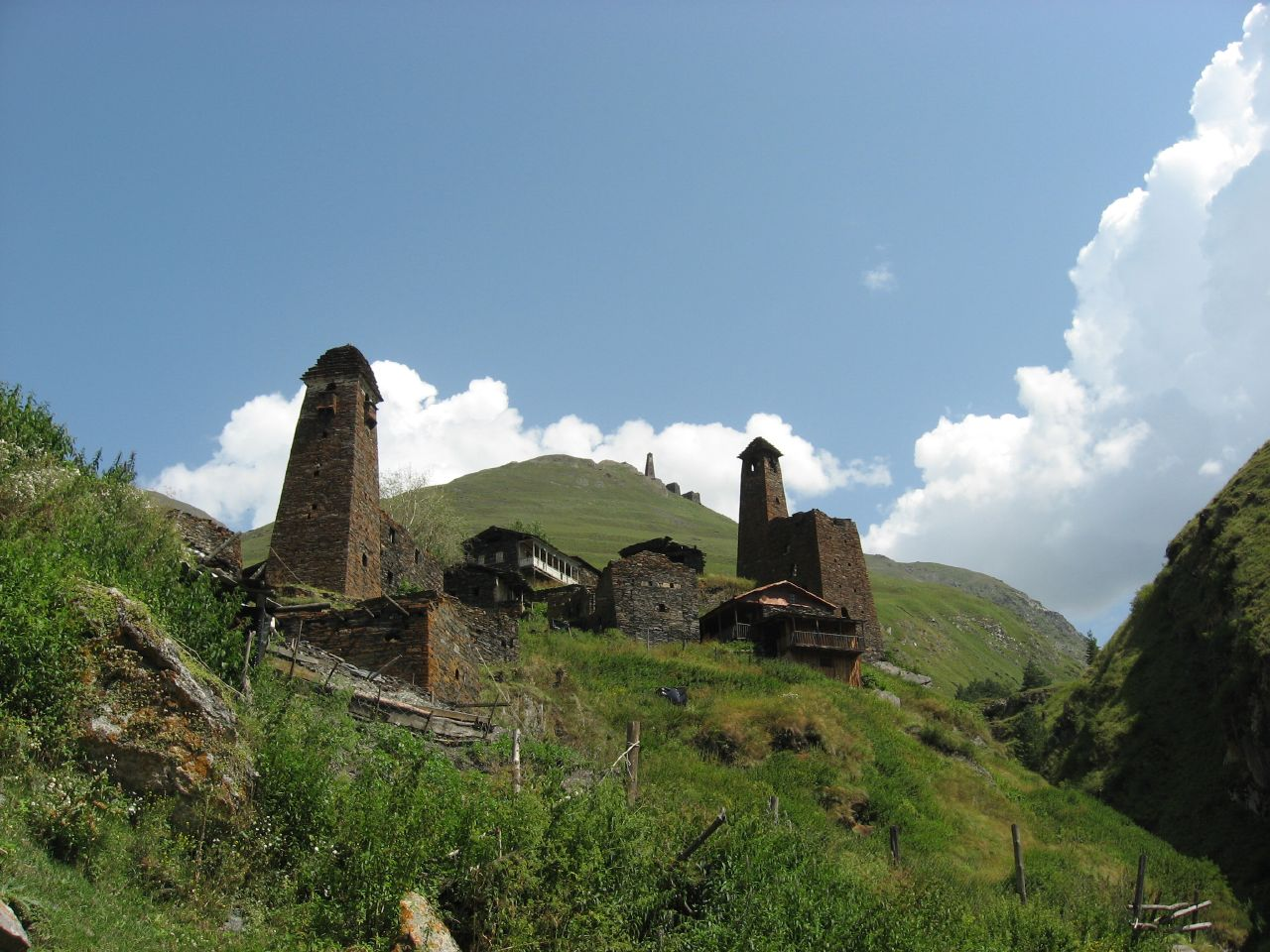
Tower houses in Dartlo

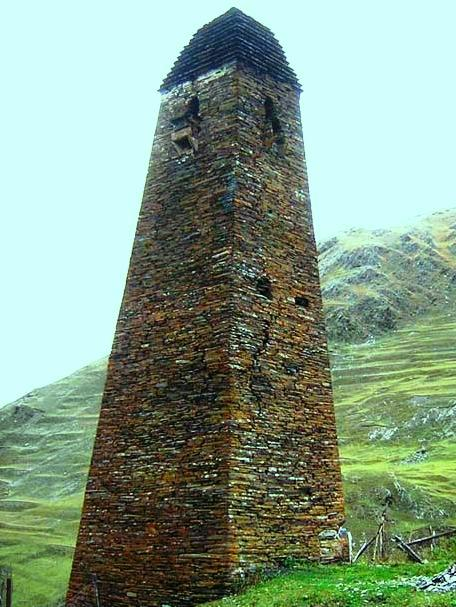
A tower in Dartlo

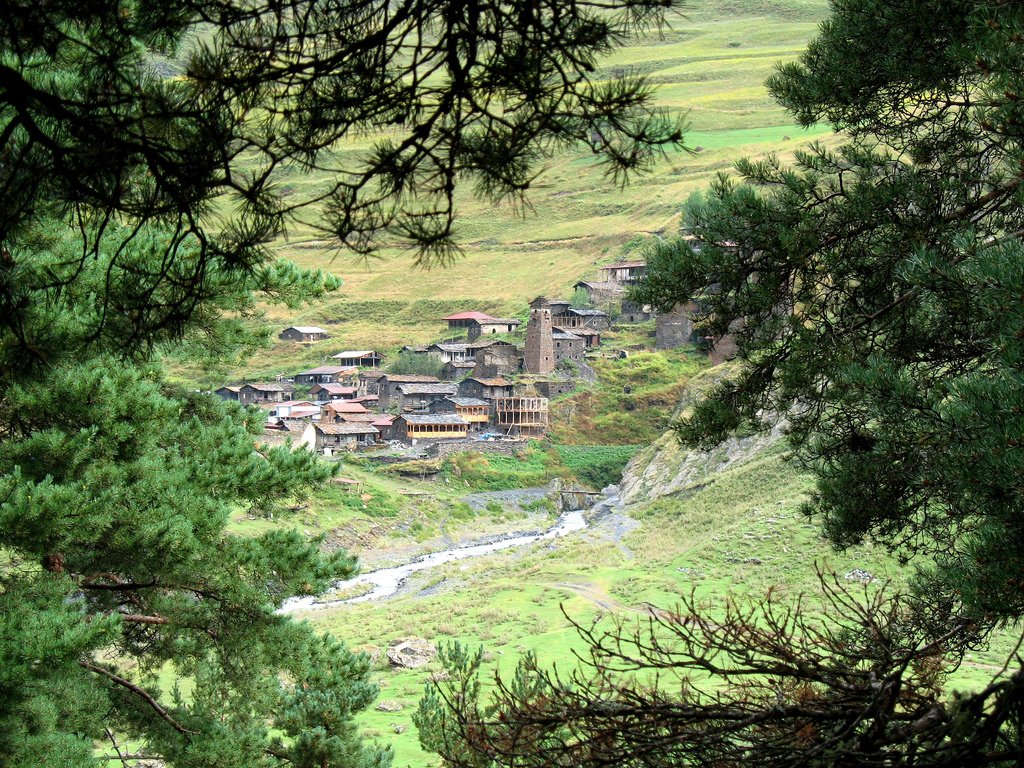
View of the village

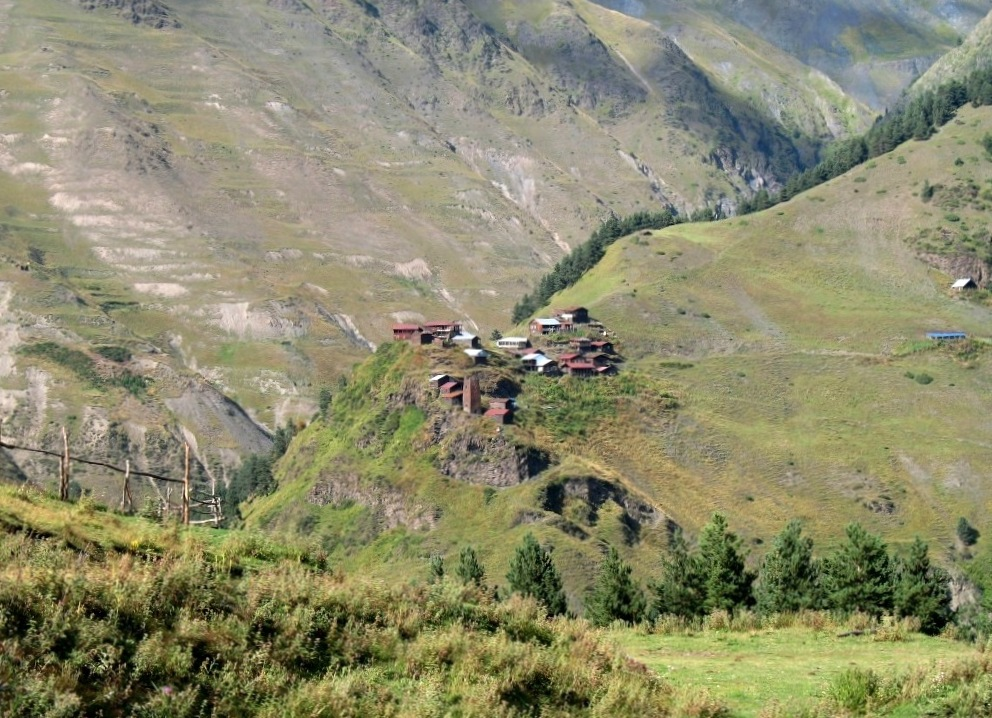
Distant view

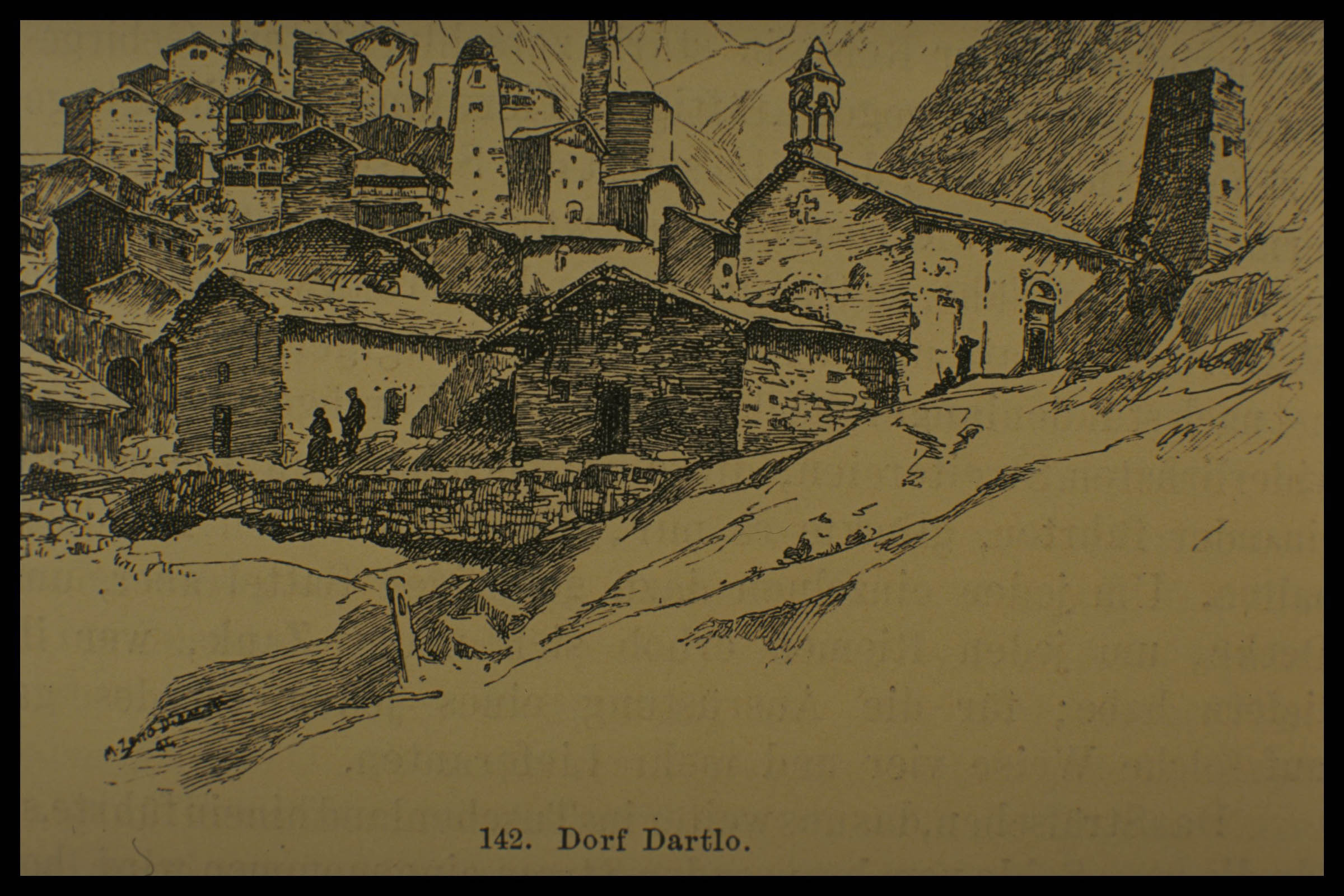
Dartlo in 1892
