= Kistauri =

Kistauri ქისტაური (Georgian)
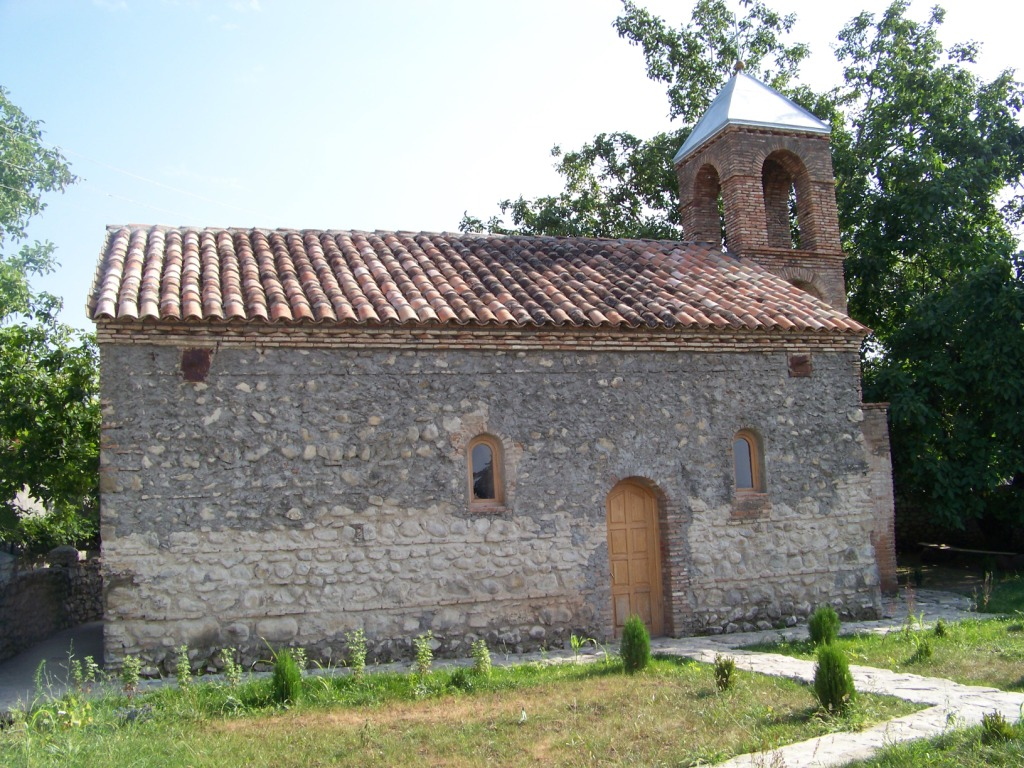
- Saint Nino church of Kistauri

- Location within Georgia
- Coordinates: 41°59′33″N 45°17′15″E
- Country: Georgia
- Mkhare: Kakheti
- District: Akhmeta
- Elevation: 540 m (1,770 ft)

Population (2014)
  - Total: 1,729
- Time zone: UTC+4 (Georgian Time)

Kistauri (Georgian: ქისტაური) is a village in the Akhmeta district, Kakheti region, Georgia. Located 7 kilometres (4.3 mi) east from Akhmeta and 27 kilometres (17 mi) west from Telavi. The village lies on the right bank of Alazani River, in the northeastern foothills of the Gombori Range.

According to the population census data of Georgia (2014), 1,729 people live in Kistauri. This village was the homeland for Georgian poet and playwright Raphael Eristavi.

== Gallery ==
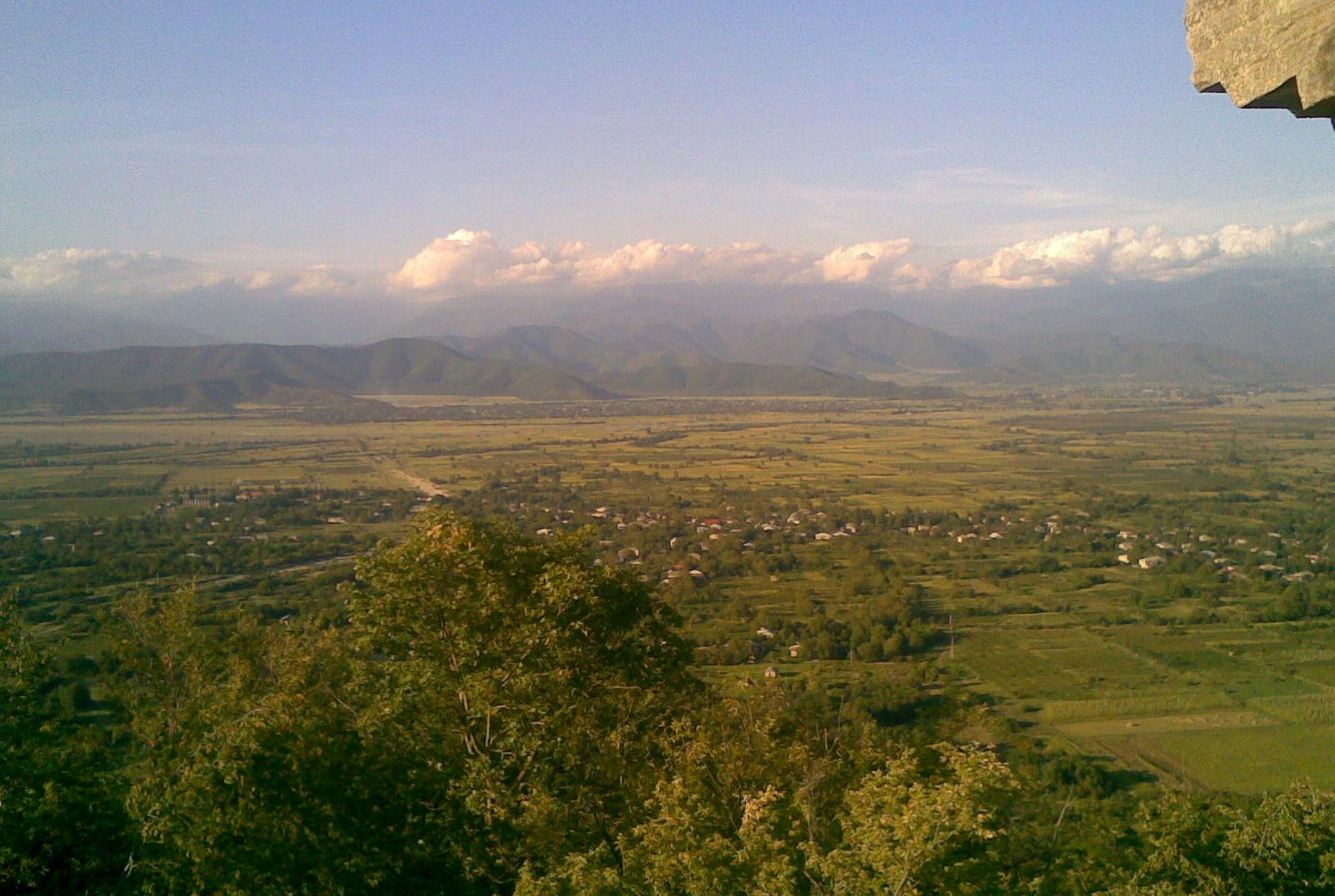
View of Kistauri from south

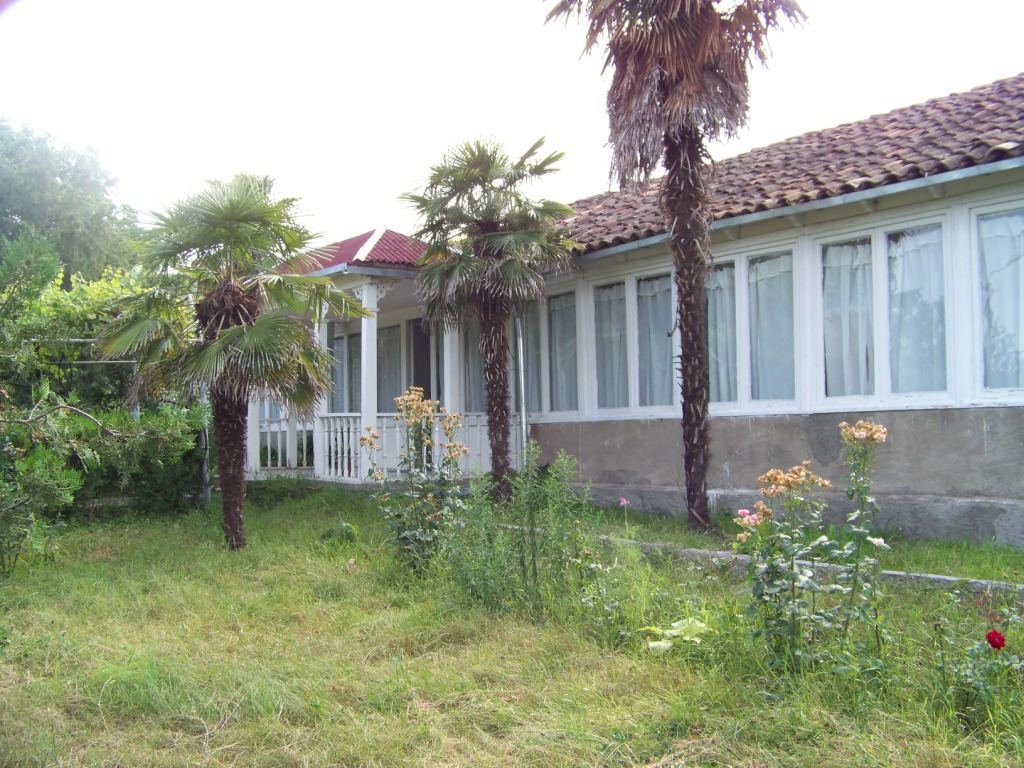
Museum of Raphael Eristavi

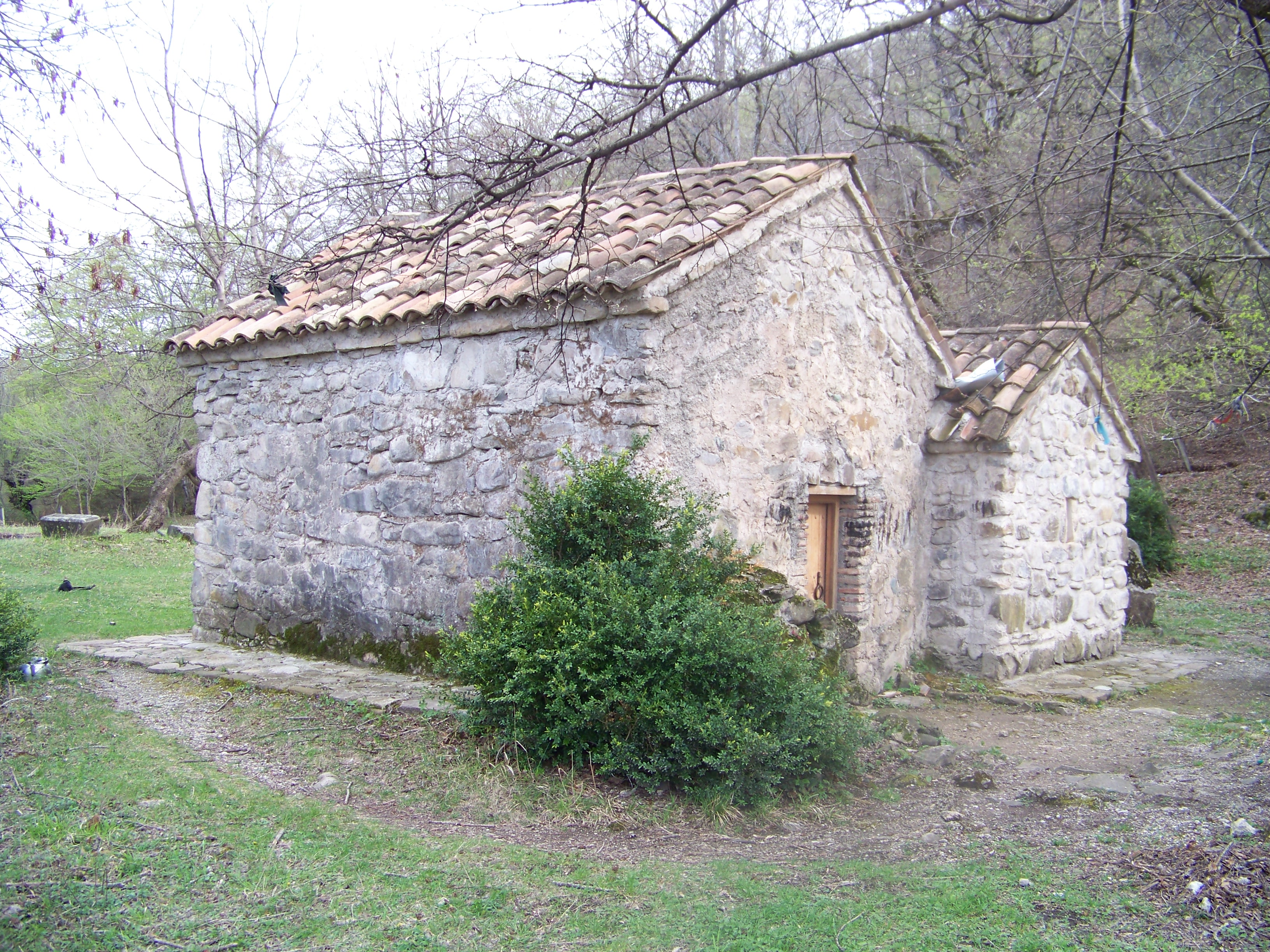
Kvelatsminda Church near Kistauri

== See also ==
- Kakheti
