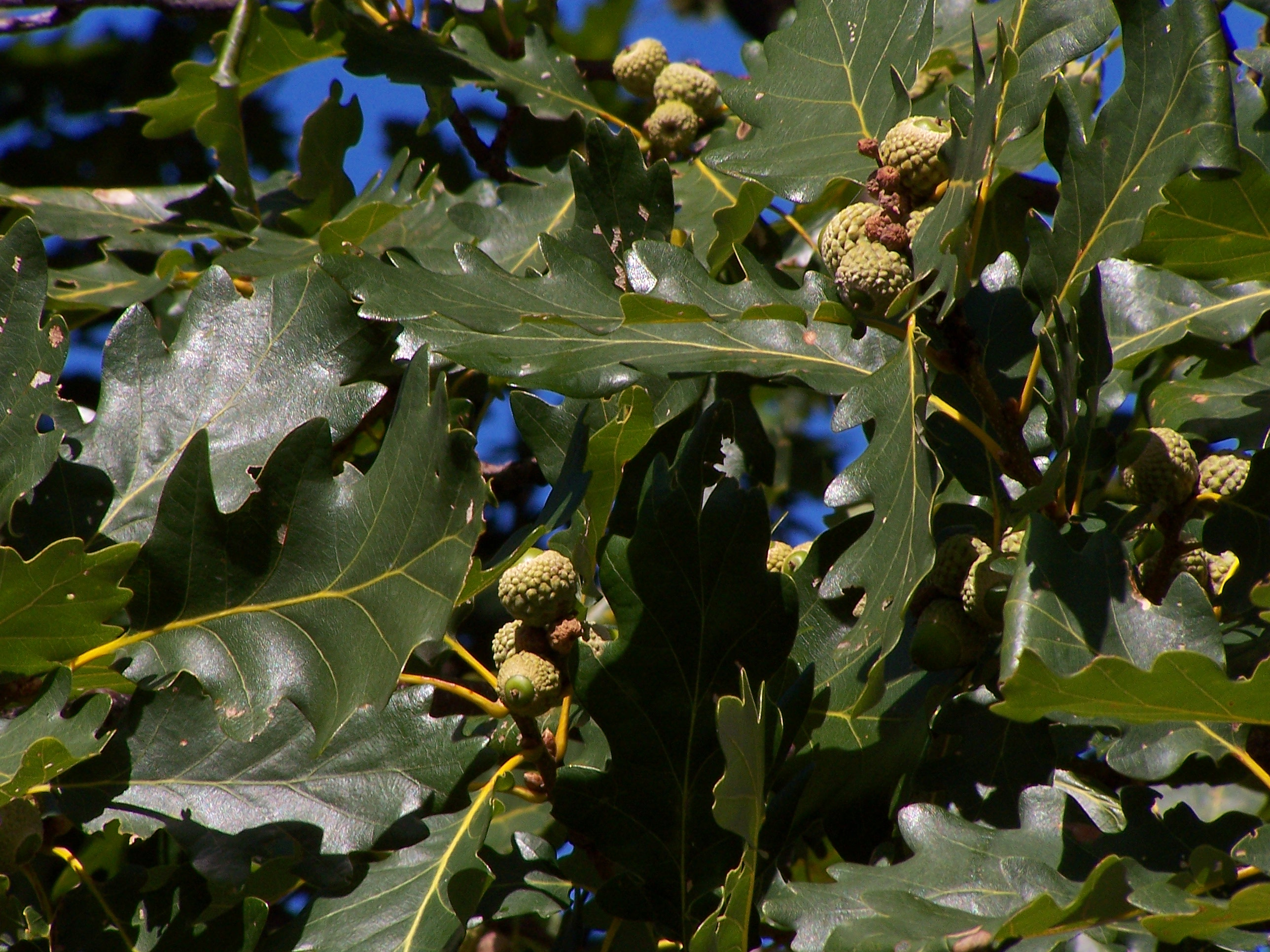

Conservation status
- Data Deficient (IUCN 3.1)

Scientific classification
- Kingdom: Plantae
- Clade: Embryophytes
- Clade: Tracheophytes
- Clade: Spermatophytes
- Clade: Angiosperms
- Clade: Eudicots
- Clade: Rosids
- Order: Fagales
- Family: Fagaceae
- Genus: Quercus
- Subgenus: Quercus subg. Quercus
- Section: Quercus sect. Quercus
- Species: Q. dalechampii

Binomial name
- Quercus dalechampii Ten.

Synonyms
- List: Quercus lanuginosa subsp. dalechampii (Ten.) A.Camus; Quercus petraea var. dalechampii (Ten.) Cristur.; Quercus pubescens var. dalechampii (Ten.) Stoj. & Jordanov; Quercus pubescens subsp. dalechampii (Ten.) B.Bock & J.-M.Tison; Quercus robur var. dalechampii (Ten.) Fiori & Paol.

= Quercus dalechampii =

Species of oak tree

Quercus dalechampii is a European species of oak in the family Fagaceae. It a tree endemic to southern Italy.
