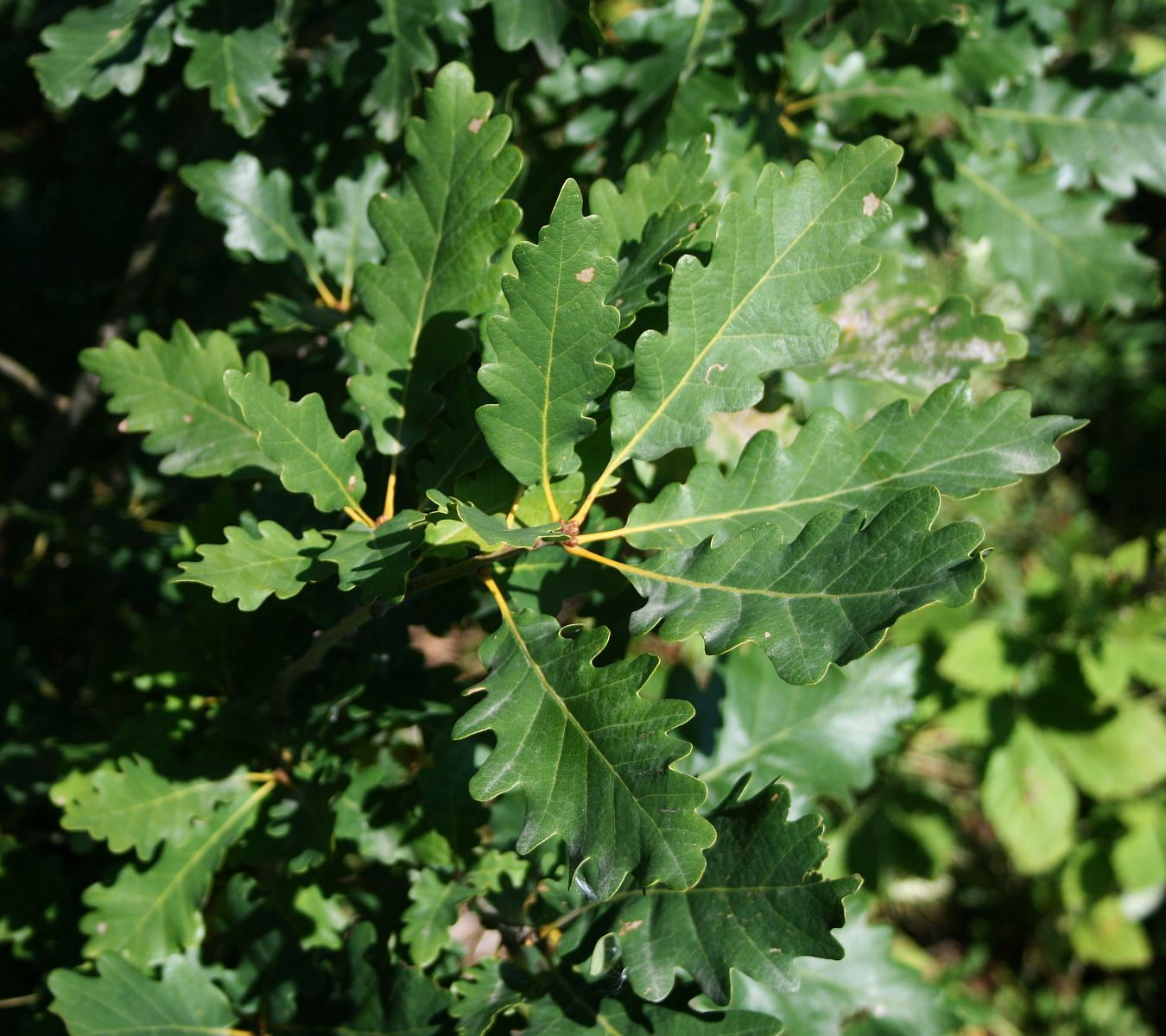
- Foliage

Scientific classification
- Kingdom: Plantae
- Clade: Tracheophytes
- Clade: Angiosperms
- Clade: Eudicots
- Clade: Rosids
- Order: Fagales
- Family: Fagaceae
- Genus: Quercus
- Species: Q. petraea
- Subspecies: Q. p. subsp. polycarpa

Trinomial name
- Quercus petraea subsp. polycarpa (Schur) Soó

Synonyms
- Quercus colchica Czeczott; Quercus dshorochensis K.Koch; Quercus hypochrysa Steven; Quercus iberica Steven ex M.Bieb.; Quercus kochiana O.Schwarz; Quercus kozlowskyi Woronow ex Grossh.; Quercus lamprophyllos K.Koch; Quercus polycarpa Schur; Quercus pseudotscharukensis Kotschy ex A.DC.; Quercus rhodopaea Velen.; Quercus sorocarpa Woronow ex Maleev; Quercus szowitzii Wenz.; plus many others at lower ranks.

= Quercus petraea subsp. polycarpa =

Subspecies of oak tree

Quercus petraea subsp. polycarpa, synonyms including Quercus iberica, is a deciduous tree native from Austria to Iran. Its range includes the Caucasus, where it may be called the Georgian oak.

== Description ==
Quercus petraea subsp. polycarpa is a fairly large tree growing up to 20–25 metres (66–82 ft) in height, or exceptionally up to 40 m (130 ft). It is known for its very short stalk and acorns that occur either in pairs or alone.

== Distribution ==
Quercus petraea subsp. polycarpa is native to central and eastern Europe from Austria to European Turkey, including Bulgaria, Czech Republic, Slovakia, Greece, Hungary, Romania, former Yugoslavia and the Caucasus (including Armenia, Azerbaijan and Georgia) and temperate asia including Turkey and Iran.

In Georgia, the tree is widely distributed throughout the drier regions of eastern Georgia and generally does not like excessively moist or marshy soils, although it can be found in large groves in moist areas of western Georgia as well. It forms forests together with chestnut, hornbeam and maple. In most areas, it grows at elevations of 400–1,000 m (1,300–3,300 ft) above sea level, but in some cases it can be found at elevations up to 1,500–2,000 m (4,900–6,600 ft) above sea level.
