= Raphael Eristavi =

Georgian poet and playwright

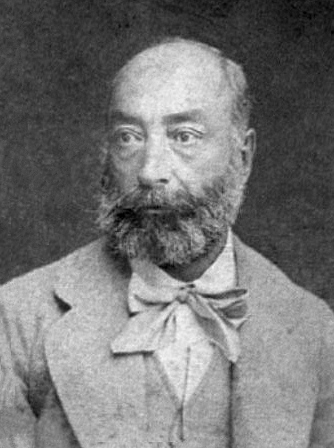
- Born: 21 April [O.S. 9 April] 1824; Kistauri, Russian Empire (now Georgia)
- Died: 4 March [O.S. 19 February] 1901
- Occupations: poet, playwright

Prince Raphael Eristavi (Georgian: რაფიელ ერისთავი; 21 April [O.S. 9 April] 1824 – 4 March [O.S. 19 February] 1901) was a Georgian poet and playwright.

== Biography ==
Eristavi was born in Kakheti on 1824, Georgia, in the Russian Empire. He attended a school for the children of the nobility in Tbilisi, graduating in 1845. In 1846, he took up a position as a civil servant.

Writing in the Georgian language, Eristavi described the life and manners of the Georgian people in poetry, short stories, plays, and ethnographic essays.

Widely popular among Georgians in his day, in 1895, Georgia had a national day of celebration in his honour.

Eristavi was admired by Joseph Stalin who dedicated his poem 'Morning' to him.

Eristavi's sister, Barbare Jorjadze is considered Georgia's first feminist and author of the popular cookbook Georgian Cuisine and Tried Housekeeping Notes.
