= Akhmeta Municipality =

Coordinates: 42.2774°N 45.4988°E

Akhmeta Municipality ახმეტის მუნიციპალიტეტი
- Municipality
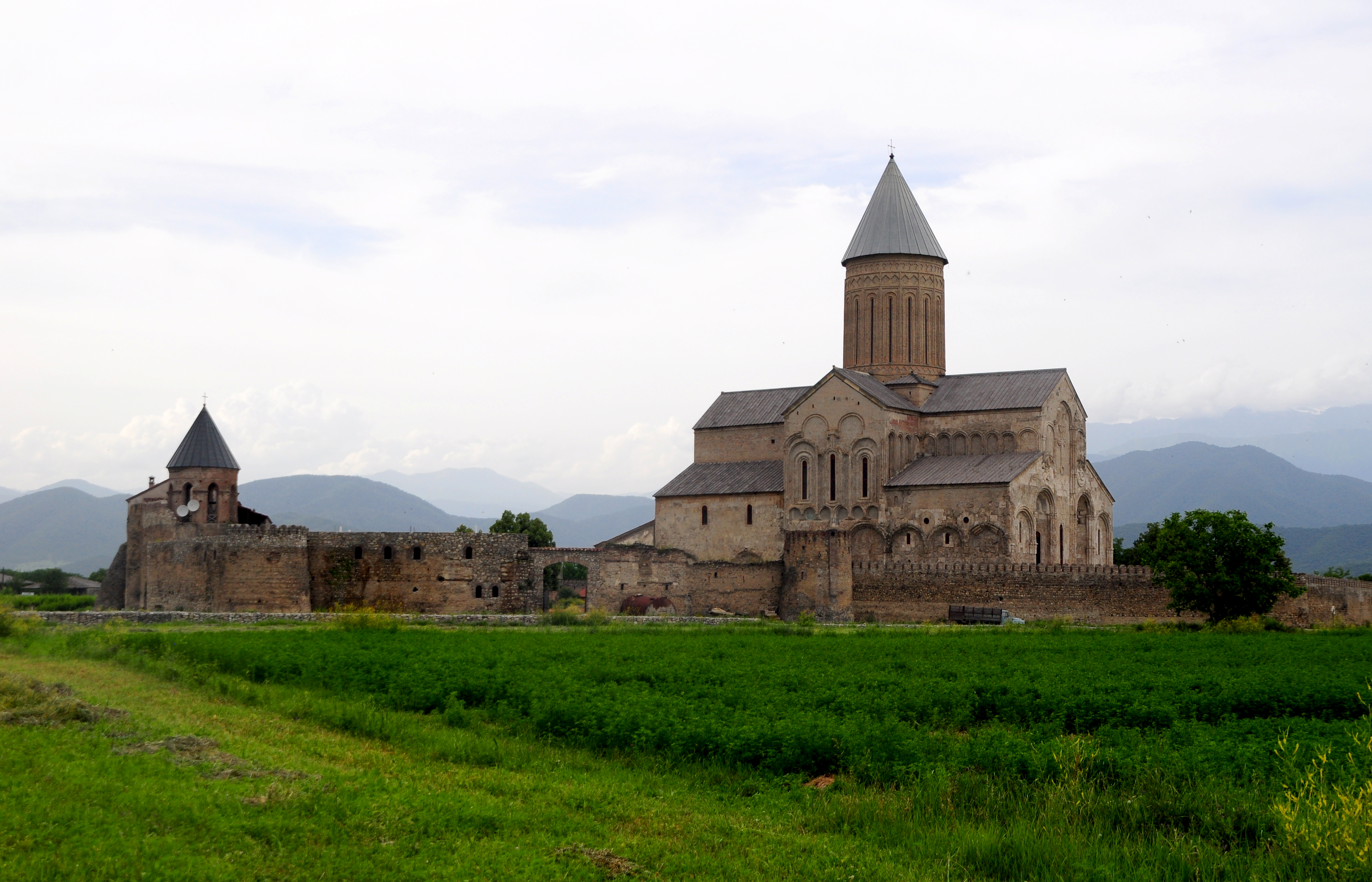
- Alaverdi

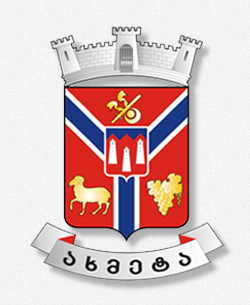
- Flag Seal

- Location of Akhmeta Municipality in Georgia
- Country: Georgia
- Region: Kakheti
- Capital: Akhmeta

Area
  - Total: 2,208 km^{2} (853 sq mi)

Population (2014)
  - Total: 31,461
  - Density: 14.25/km^{2} (36.90/sq mi)
- Time zone: UTC+4
- Website: akhmeta.gov.ge/ge

Akhmeta (Georgian: ახმეტის მუნიციპალიტეტი, Axmeṫis municiṗaliṫeṫi) is the administrative – territorial unit in Eastern Georgia, in the region of Kakheti. The administrative center of Akhmeta municipality is the town Akhmeta.

The Municipality borders Dusheti Municipality and Tianeti Municipality to the west, Chechnya to the north, Telavi Municipality and Dagestan to the east, and Sagarejo Municipality to the south.

Akhmeta Municipality includes the historic region of Tusheti and the Pankisi Gorge. The area of the municipality covers 2207.6 km^{2}.

== History ==
Until 1930, the current territory of Akhmeta Municipality was a part of Tianeti Mazra, from 1930 it moved to Telavi Mazra, from 1951 it was separated into a distinct area, in 1963–1964 it was returned to Telavi district. From August 1964, it was re-established as a separate district within the present borders. Akhmeta was declared a Town in 1966. Since 2006 – municipality.

== Administrative divisions and population ==
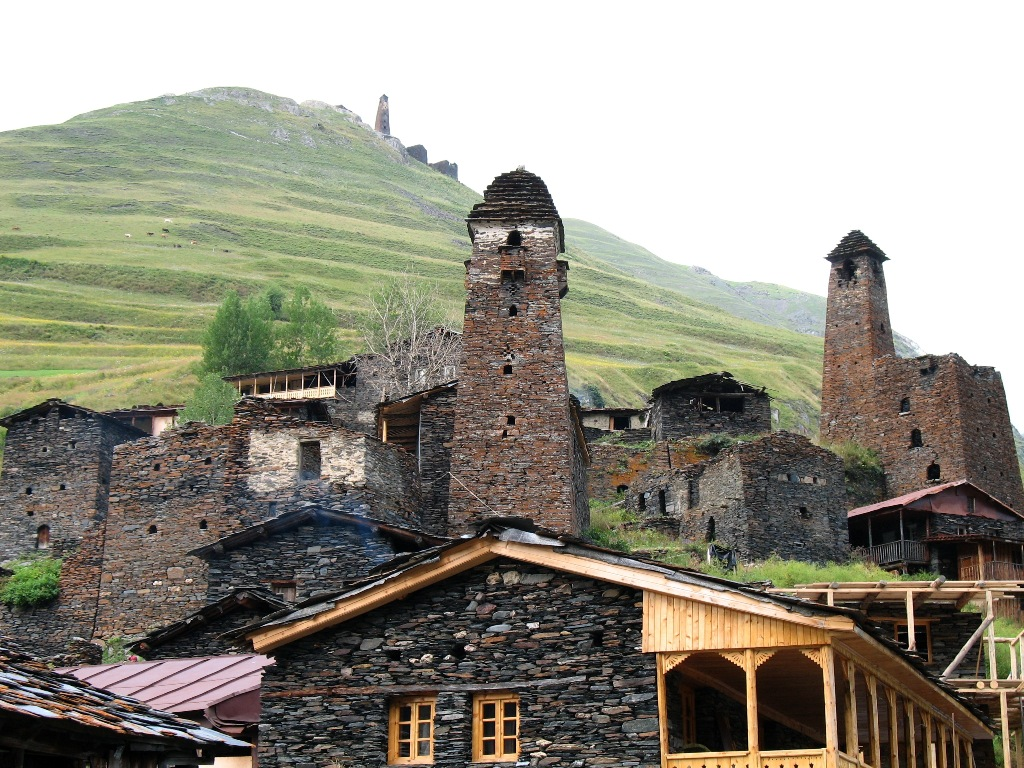
Dartlo

Akhmeta Municipality consists of 15 administrative units and 108 settlements. According to the National Statistics Office of Georgia, the population of Akhmeta Municipality as of 1 January 2021, is 28.9 thousand people. 6.4 thousand people live in urban areas and 22.5 thousand people in rural areas.

According to the 2014 census data the population of Akhmeta District was 31,461. 78.99% of them was Georgians, 17.39% Kists, 2.21% Ossetians, 0.41% Chechens.

- The administrative unit of the town Akhmeta – town Akhmeta, and villages: Bughani, Kvemo Chopchauri;
- The administrative unit of Matani – the village Matani
- The administrative unit of Sakobiano – villages: Bakilovani, Dedisperuli, Kutsakhta, Sakobiano, Koreti, Kvareltskali, Khevischala;
- The administrative unit of Duisi – villages: Duisi, Tsinubani;
- The administrative unit of Jokolo – villages: Birkiani, Dzibakhevi, Jokolo;
- The administrative unit of Khalatsani – villages: Dumasturi, Omalo; Zemo Khalatsani, Kvemo Khalatsani, Shua Khalatsani;
- The administrative unit of Zemo Alvani – villages: Zemo Alvani, Khorbalo;
- The administrative unit of Kvemo Alvani – villages: Babaneuri, Kvemo Alvani;
- The administrative unit of Maghraani – villages: Argokhi, Maghraani, Pichkhovani;
- The administrative unit of Ozhio – villages: Alaverdi, Koghoto, Ozhio;
- The administrative unit of Zemo Khodasheni – villages: Atskuri, Akhaldaba, Zemo Khodasheni, Chabinani, Chareqauli, Khveliandro, Khorkheli;
- The administrative unit of Qistauri – villages: Arashenda, Akhalsheni, Akhshani, The fields of Akhasheni, Ingeti, Akhmeta Municipality, Osiauri, Sachale, Qistauri;
- The administrative unit of Kasristskali – the village Kasristskali;
- The administrative unit of Shakhvetila- villages: Bukhrebi, Vvedzebi, Naduqnari, Sabue, Shakhvetila, Chachkhriala, Tchartala, Jaburi;
- The administrative unit of Tusheti – villages: Ageurta, Alisgori, Baso, Beghela, Biquurta, Botchorna, Bukhurta, Girevi, Gogrulta, Gudanta, Dadikurta, Dano, Dartlo, Daqiurta, Diklo, Dotchu, Etelta, Iliurta, Ipkhori, Vakisdziri, Verkhovani, Vestmo, Vestomta, Vedziskhevi, Tushetis Sabue, Indurta, Intsukhi, Kvavlo, Koklata, Natsikhari, Omalo, Ortsikhe, Zhvelurta, Sagirta, Sachighlo, Tbatana, Parsma, Qumelaurta, Tsokalta, Shenaqo, Shtrolta, Chiglaurta, Chigho, Tsaro, Tchala, Tchero, Tchesho, Tchontio, Khakhabo, Khiso, Jvarboseli, Hegho.

== Geography ==
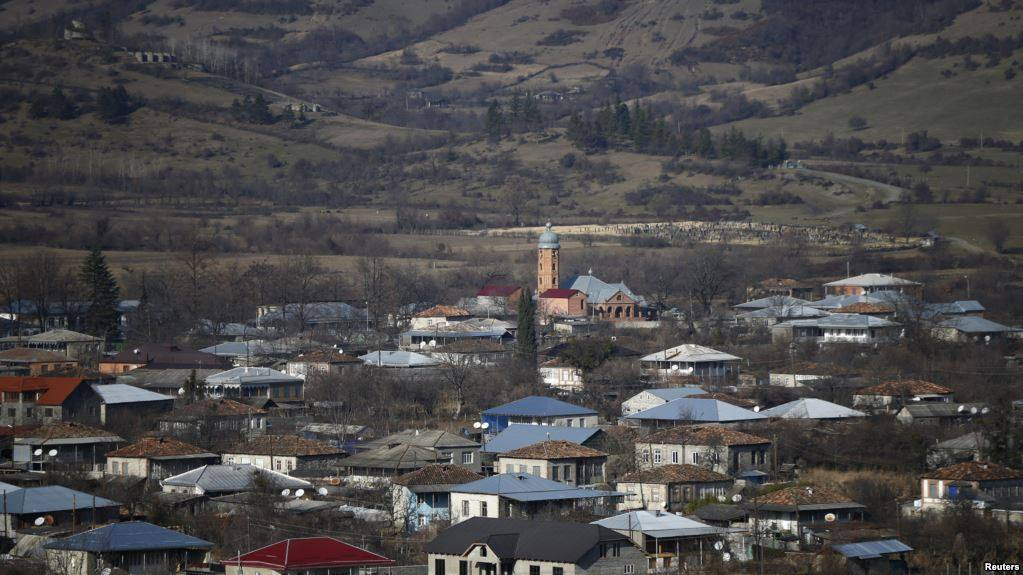
Duisi

The municipality is bordered on the west by Dusheti and Tianeti municipalities, on the north by Chechnya, on the east by Telavi Municipality and the Autonomous Republic of Dagestan, and on the south by Sagarejo Municipality.

The area of Akhmeta municipality is 2207.6 km^{2}. Agricultural lands occupy 80,266 hectares, while 91,200 hectares of the municipality are covered with forests.

The lower zone of the territorial unit has a moderately humid climate, with hot summers and relatively cold winters. Annual precipitation is in the range of 770–820 mm. The moderately humid climate is formed in the area of 700–1200 m above sea level. The average annual rainfall is 1200–2000 mm. The average temperature in the coldest month of the year, January, is (-) 3 °C, and in July - 22 °C. At 1200–2000 m above sea level, a humid climate is developed, with cold winters and cool summers; the average annual rainfall is around 1500–1700 mm.

The hydrological network is very frequent on the territory of the municipality. This administrative unit is characterized by the fast mountain rivers. The Pirikiti Alazani and Tushetis Alazani basins represent the rivers of the municipality.

== Politics ==
Akhmeta Municipal Assembly (Georgian: ახმეტის საკრებულო) is a representative body in Akhmeta Municipality. currently consisting of 30 members. The council is assembles into session regularly, to consider subject matters such as code changes, utilities, taxes, city budget, oversight of city government and more. Akhmeta sakrebulo is elected every four year. The last election was held in October 2021.

Party	2017	2021	Current Municipal Assembly
Georgian Dream	21	18	
United National Movement	4	11	
For Georgia		1	
European Georgia	2		
Alliance of Patriots	1		
Labour Party	1		
Independent	2		
Total	31	30	

== Education ==
There are 24 public schools, 37 Nursery schools, and 1 College operate in the municipality. There are 1547 children enrolled in nursery schools. Eight libraries are functioning in Akhmeta Municipality, where 133688 books are kept. With the initiative of the National Library of Georgia, working on the creation of an electronic library is underway.

== Culture ==
Three museums are operating in Akhmeta municipality (Rapiel Eristavi House Museum, Akhmeta Museum of Local Lore in the village of Kvemo Alvani and Pankisi Ethnographic Museum), Besik Mamiauri School of Art and Cognition, a union of music schools with branches in the villages of Matani, Duisi, Zemo Alvani and Kvemo Alvani and the Cultural Center, under which are 10 Rural Culture Houses.

=== Festivals and public holidays ===
Event	Date	Description
"Bidzinaoba"	October 1	To celebrate the birthday of Georgian national hero and holy martyr, Bidzina Cholokashvili, Bidzinaoba is held in Telavi on October 1 every year.
"Tushetoba"	August	The public holiday Tushetoba was established in the 70s of the 20th century. It is related to the life of Tushetian shepherds and somehow reflects the attitude of the people towards this traditional activity. The holiday is celebrated in August when the one stage of shepherds' summer activities is completed and the preparations for the transition to winter life begin.
"Zezvaoba"	Last Sunday of May	The public holiday Zezvaoba is celebrated on the last Sunday of May, in the village of Kvemo Alvani, where the whole village participates. As a part of a holiday, an exhibition and trade of carpets is held.
"Alaverdoba"	September 28	The feast day of Ioseb Alaverdeli (St. Joseph of Alaverdi, one of the Thirteen Assyrian Fathers) is celebrated in Alaverdi Monastery. Night prayer is held in St. George's Cathedral of Alaverdi. Pilgrims visit Alaverdi Monastery from different parts of Georgia.
Poetry – Kapiaoba festival in Ilto Valley	May	Since 2015, in the village of Tchartala, Akhmeta Municipality, in the Ilto Valley, a poetry festival Kapiaoba on the bank of Ilto river has been held. Poem tellers, singers, and folk ensembles take part in the festival. The main goal of the festival is to promote folk tradition and Poetry. The festival is held in May of each year.
"Kakutsaoba"	July 14	This holiday is related to the name of Kaikhosro (Kakutsa) Cholokashvili, a resident of the village Matani, a national hero of Georgia. The holiday is traditionally celebrated on July 14, Kakutsa's birthday.
"Keinoba"	First day of Great Fasting	"Keinoba" is celebrated on the first day of Great Fasting, but it is not related to the Eastern Orthodox Christian faith. It originates from the pagan era. Until the 20th century, Keinoba was celebrated all over Georgia, now it is only preserved in the village of Matani. It is a theatrical show, in which almost the entire population participates.

== Sports ==
There are three sports schools in Akhmeta Municipality – Akhmeta Football School "Bakhtrioni", Sports-Educational Institution of Akhmeta Sports School Complex, and Zurab Zviadauri Judo Sports School of Akhmeta.

The schools have judo, freestyle, Greco-Roman, arm wrestling, football, basketball, athletics, tennis, kickbox, rugby sections, which involve up to 700 children. Sports competitions and tournaments are held in Akhmeta Municipality throughout the year.

In Akhmeta municipality there is a Horse riding (equestrian) club within Akhmeta Complex Sports School. At the equestrian base, around 35–40 children are taking training.

== Tourism ==
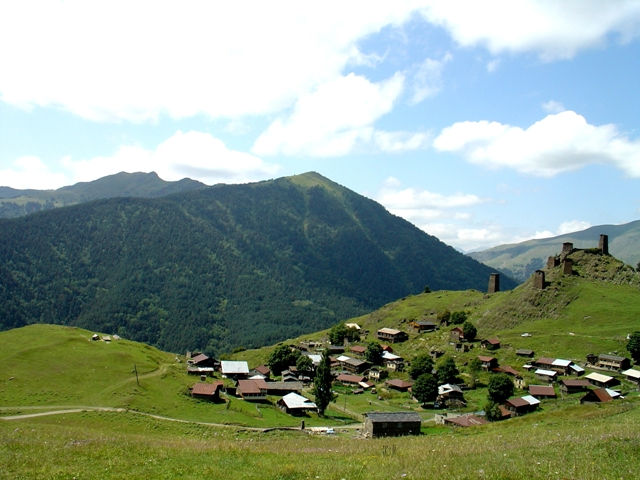
Omalo

A Department of Tourism Development, Foreign Relations and International Projects operates under the Akhmeta Municipal Administration, which provides information to foreign and local tourists on tourism infrastructure, tourist sites, tourism programs, transport, natural monuments, protected areas, architectural and archaeological sites, cultural events, festivals, festivals, public holidays and other topics. The following types of tourism are developed in Akhmeta Municipality:

- Hiking tourism;
- Equestrian tourism;
- Ecotourism;
- Agrotourism.

=== Visitor Center of Akhmeta municipality, Tusheti ===
Tusheti is located across the main ridge of the Caucasus, on its northern slope. Tusheti is included in the tentative list of UNESCO World Heritage sites.

== Economy ==
The local economy of Akhmeta Municipality is mainly represented by agriculture, processing industry, tourism, services, and trade. According to the data of the National Statistics Office of Georgia for May 1, 2019, 3626 registered enterprises are operating in the territory of Akhmeta Municipality, which are classified into 5 large, 30 medium, and 448 small enterprises. There are 9 small family cellars in the municipality.

Most of all, 336 enterprises operate in the trade and services sector, up to 83 facilities provide hotel-type services in the municipality.

The agricultural sector is represented by 13 small enterprises, and 19 cooperatives. 34 small, 3 medium and 1 large enterprise operating in the field of industry are represented by wine factories, building materials, and wood processing industries as well as furniture enterprises.

== Historical landmarks and sightseeing ==
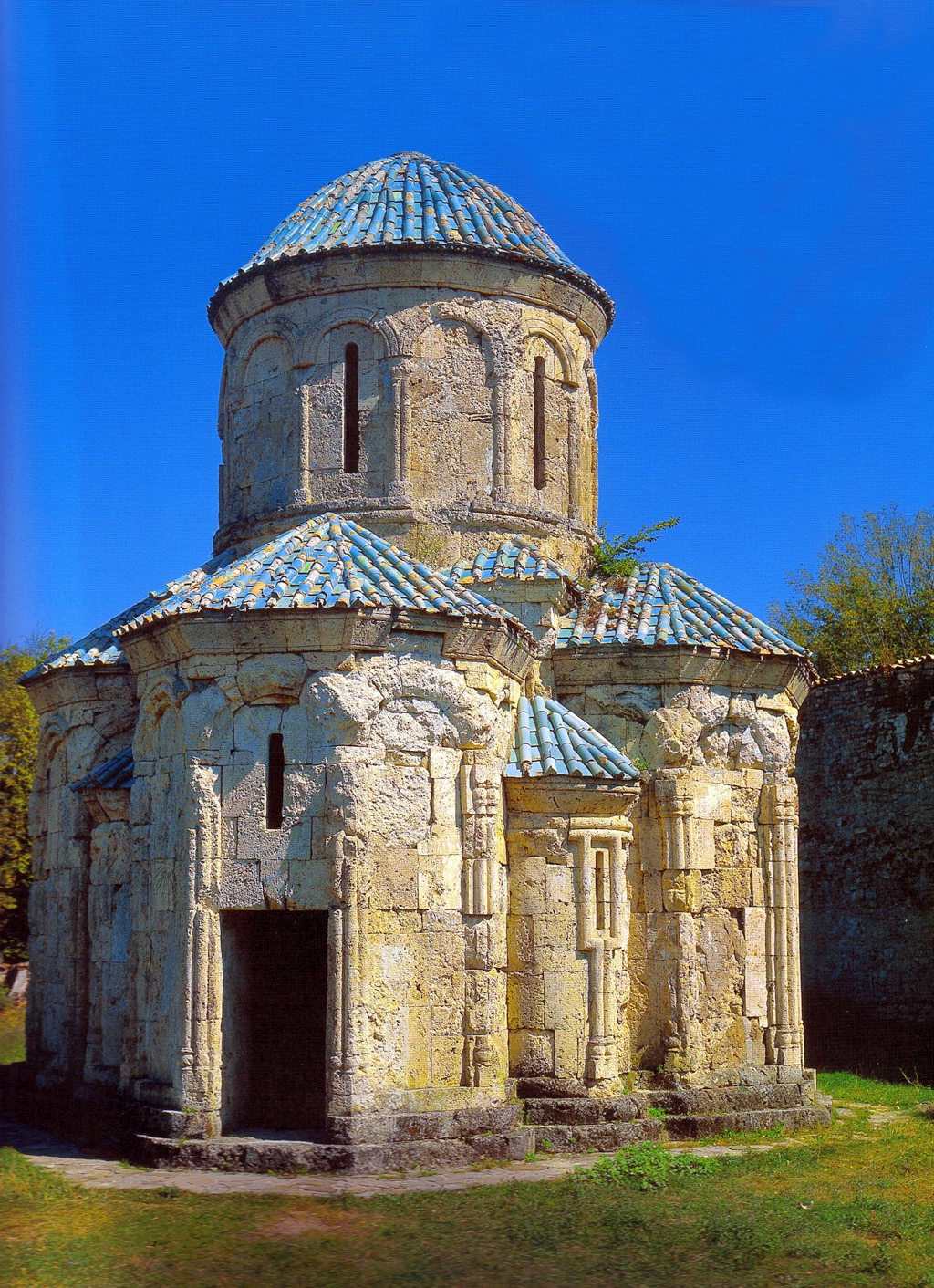
Kvetera Church

=== Bakhtrioni fortress ===
Bakhtrioni Fortress – a feudal era fortress in Akhmeta municipality of Kakheti region. It is located near the town of Akhmeta, southeast of the village of Khorbalo, on the left bank of the Alazani River, near its confluence with the Ilto River. The fortress was built in the late 50s of the XVII century by the command of Shah Abbas II of Iran.

=== Kvetera ===
The historic fortress city of Kvetera is located on the right bank of the river Ilto, on the left side of the highway connecting Akhmeta-Tianeti, 12 km from Akhmeta. The castle-city complex includes inner castle, lower castle, fence, palace, hall church, and the main attraction – a domed church.

=== Alaverdi Monastery ===
Alaverdi Monastery was founded in the middle of the VI century by one of the Assyrian holy fathers, Joseph Alaverdi (Ioseb Alaverdeli). At the beginning of the XI century, Kvirike, the king of Kakheti, in the place of a small church of St. George, built a cathedral, which is known by the name of Alaverdi.

=== Matani Tskhrakara ===
The monastery complex is located in the west of the village of Matani, Akhmeta Municipality. According to the decree of the President of Georgia of November 7, 2006, the monastery complex was awarded the category of the immovable cultural monuments of National significance.

=== Tskhrakara Palace Complex ===
Remains of the palace complex of King Levan of Kakheti (r. 1518–1574) are located between the villages of Zemo Alvani and Kvemo Alvani in Akhmeta Municipality, above the Alazani field, on the foothills of the Caucasus. Near it, the basilica of St. Ioane the Baptist is located, in which the severely damaged portraits of King Levan and Queen Tinatin have survived.

== Notable people ==
Photo	Name	Years	Description
	Raphael Eristavi	1824–1901	Georgian poet and playwright.
	Kakutsa Cholokashvili	1888–1930	Georgian military officer and a commander of an anti-Soviet guerrilla movement in Georgia. He is regarded as a national hero in Georgia.
	Otar Megvinetukhutsesi	1932–2013	Georgian actor.
	Zurab Zviadauri	1981–	Georgian judoka, Olympic champion.
	Giorgi Antsukhelidze	1984–2008	Georgian soldier, National Hero.
	Zviad Gogotchuri	1986–	Georgian Paralympic judoka, Paralympic champion.

== Twin towns ==
Akhmeta Municipality is twinned with:

- Bilhorod-Dnistrovskyi, Ukraine
- Klaipėda, Lithuania
- Panevėžys, Lithuania
- Ialoveni District, Moldova

== See also ==
- List of municipalities in Georgia (country)
