= Akhmeta =

Akhmeta ახმეტა
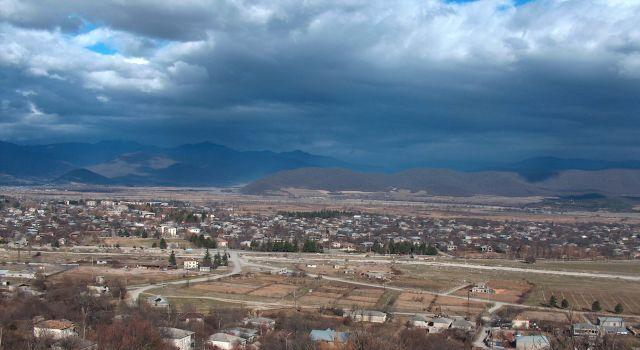

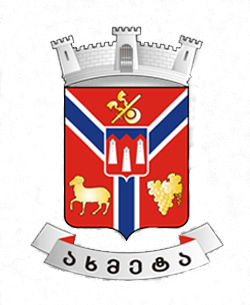
- Flag Seal

- Location in Georgia Akhmeta (Kakheti)
- Coordinates: 42°02′N 45°12′E
- Country: Georgia
- Mkhare: Kakheti
- Municipality: Akhmeta
- Elevation: 567 m (1,860 ft)

Population (2024)
  - Total: 5,795
- Time zone: UTC+4 (Georgian Time)
- Postal code: 0900
- Website: The Georgian Domain Name Registry

Akhmeta (Georgian: ახმეტა [aχmetʼa]) is a town in Kakheti, Georgia, and is the administrative centre of Akhmeta Municipality. It is situated on the west side of Alazani, close to the Pankisi Gorge. The town is situated at 567 m. In 1966, it received the status of Kalaki.

On January 31, 1812, villagers of Akhmeta revolted against the Russians and sparked a massive uprising all across Kakheti.

== See also ==
- Kakheti
- Telavi
- Akhmeta Municipality
