= Nureddin Akhriev =

Ingush scientist

Docent Nurēddin Akhriev
- Born: Musost; September 17, 1904 (Note: O.S. 30 September 1904.); Vladikavkaz, Vladikavkazsky okrug, Terek Oblast, Russian Empire
- Died: October 14, 1987 (aged 83); Moscow, RSFSR, Soviet Union
- Resting place: Furtoug, Ingushetia, Russia
- Education: Mountainous Institute of Public Education
- Parents: Gabert Akhriev (father); Zabi Kurieva (mother)
- Relatives: Rashid-bek Akhriev (cousin)
- Scientific career
- Fields: arab studies, history, oriental studies, philology, caucasology
- Workplaces: Moscow State University
- Military career
- Allegiance: Soviet Union
- Branch: Soviet Army
- Service years: 1940–1945
- Rank: Commander of the division of cadets
- Conflicts: Russian Civil War; World War Two

Nurēddin Gabertovich Akhriev (Note: Russian: Нуреддин Габертович Ахриев, IPA: [nʊrʲɪdʲɪn ɡəbʲɪrtəvʲɪt͡ɕ ɐxrʲɪ(j)ɪf]; Ingush: Оахаранаькъан ГӀаьбартечун Нурдин, romanized: Oakharanäqhan Ghäbartechun Nurdin; his first name also spelled Nurdin while his patronymic spelled Gebertovich, Goberdovich.) (born Musost; 17 September [O.S. 30 September] 1904 – 14 October 1987) was a Soviet orientalist who specialized in Arabic studies, and a docent of Moscow State University, where he used to teach for 40 years, being also the first Ingush to do so. He is considered one of the founders of Ingush Arabic studies.

Born on 17 September 1904, Nureddin first studied at the Vladikavkaz Cadet Corps and then at the 2nd practical school of Vladikavkaz. During the Russian Civil War, he was a reserve lieutenant colonel. After the war, he studied philology and orientalism, successfully graduating with honors from the Moscow Institute of Oriental Studies in 1940. His dissertation on the topic of "Crusades on the development of military affairs in Europe" never came to he published due to him being drafted to Soviet Army.

Nureddin was recruited as a career officer and worked at the headquarters of the Transcaucasian Military District. In the World War II, Nureddin participated on the Transcaucasian, Crimean and 4th Ukrainian fronts. In 1941–1942, Nureddin often was in Iran due to his military missions, in 1943, even becoming a part of a Soviet working group that prepared the Tehran Conference.

Because of Nureddin's public statements about the illegality and erroneousness of the deportation of the Chechens and Ingush and the liquidation of their autonomy, he was arrested on 8 March 1951 and spent almost 4 years in prison. On 10 January 1955 he was released. After his release, Nureddin continued working at the Moscow State University, where he worked up until his death on 14 October 1987.

== Background ==
Born as an ethnic Ingush under the name Musost (possibly in honor of his great-grandfather Musost Akhriev) on 17 September [O.S. 30 September] 1904 in Vladikavkaz, Vladikavkazsky okrug to a family of Gabert Akhriev, a colonel of Russian cavalry who also bore the title of a 'military foreman'. Nureddin's mother was Zabi Kurieva, who died when he was just over 3 years old. Like his father, Nureddin's grandfather Temurko Akhriev was also a colonel of Russian Cavalry and foreman of Dzherakh Society. He died in 1878 in the Bulgarian city of Pleven during the Russo-Turkish War of 1877–1878. Nureddin was the cousin of Rashid-bek Akhriev, aviator of the Soviet Air Forces.

During the outbreak of the Russian Revolution in 1918, Nureddin's father Gabert sided with the Red Army and voluntarily joined it, thus subsequently fighting in the Russian Civil War. Later, after the end of the war, he became a teacher in Novy Dzheyrakh. There he worked up until his death in 1933.

== Early years ==
Nureddin first studied a at the Vladikavkaz Cadet Corps, but soon after the Russian Revolution, it was closed, therefore he began attending the 2nd practical school of Vladikavkaz.

During the Russian Civil War Nureddin Akhriev participated on the side of Bolsheviks and fought against the Whites. By rank, he was a reserve lieutenant colonel. In his autobiography, Nureddin Akhriev even claimed he was a liaison of Sergei Kirov and Sergo Ordzhonikidze.

After the end of the war, Nureddin studied at the Faculty of Physics and Mathematics of the Mountainous Institute of Public Education in Vladikavkaz, from which he graduated in 1926, later teaching at a local school. He also became a member of the CPSU in the same year.

Nureddin later became a member of Ingush Literature Society and then an assistant platoon commander of the Vladikavkaz battalion of special forces. In 1927 he was moved to Rostov-on-Don, so he began working at the North Caucasian Regional Gorsky Research Institute as a researcher, while at the North Caucasian National Publishing House he helped produce textbooks for Ingush and Chechen schools.

In 1928, due to his appointment as the Executive Secretary of the Permanent Mission of the Ingush Autonomous Oblast under the Presidium of the All-Russian Central Executive Committee Nureddin moved to Moscow. For a short period, he held this office until he became a teacher at the Far East University in the same year, where he worked until 1937. This study ended when because of another business trip, he moved to the Arabist department of the Moscow Institute of Oriental Studies, carried out according to a special recruitment of the Central Committee of the Communist Party of the Soviet Union.

In 1940, he graduated with honors from this institute, and was awarded by the decision of the State Examination Commission the qualification of a referent-translator for Arab countries. As noted by the commission, Nureddin Akhriev had an excellent knowledge of Arabic, French and English languages. He was preparing an dissertation on the topic of "Crusades on the development of military affairs in Europe", when all of sudden, he was drafted to Soviet Army, which prevented him from doing so. He was recruited as a career officer and worked at the headquarters of the Transcaucasian Military District. According to family traditions, he also participated in the Winter War, though there's no documentary evidence of his participation.

== World War II ==
During the World War II, Nureddin participated on the Transcaucasian, Crimean and 4th Ukrainian fronts, leading the 7th department of the political administration of the Transcaucasian Military District and the Transcaucasus Front, later successively commander of the division of cadets. In the Tbilisi Higher Artillery Command School, he was a senior teacher as the deputy commander of the 16th Anti-Aircraft Artillery Division.

In the period of 1941 to 1942, Nureddin often was in Iran due to his military missions. In 1943, he was part of a Soviet working group that prepared the Tehran Conference. During his visit of Iran, he even wrote a short enquiry named "Brief historical information about Azerbaijan" (Russian: Краткая историческая справка об Азербайджане, romanized: Kratkaya istoricheskaya spravka ob Azerbayjane) describing the Iranian Azerbaijan, its borders, history, as well as an assessment of its current state.

== Arrest ==
After the end of the war in 1945, Nureddin resumed teaching Arabic at the Diplomatic School of the Ministry of Foreign Affairs of the USSR in Moscow. At the same time he was teaching at the philological and historical faculties of Moscow State University.

On 30 March 1951, the Ministry of State Security filed a case against him, and on 22 August, Nureddin was sentenced to eight years in prison under the article 58-10 of RSFSR, subsequently being removed from the Communist Party. The reason for the arrest was Nureddin's public statements about the illegality and erroneousness of the deportation of the Chechens and Ingush and the liquidation of their autonomy in 1944. During his arrest, part of his personal library was confiscated by the NKVD employees.

== Later years ==
On 10 January 1955 he was released as his sentence was canceled and the criminal case dismissed by a decree of the Procurator General of the Soviet Union. Nureddin was reinstated in the Communist Party.

From 1956 to 1984, Nureddin continued teaching Arabic at the Institute of Asian and African Countries (Note: Before 1956, the "Faculty of Philology of Moscow State University".) and lectured at the Higher Diplomatic School of the Ministry of Foreign Affairs and the Frunze Military Academy. Nureddin also studied the life and activities of Imam Shamil.

The Russian-Soviet historian and archeologist, doctor of historical sciences Evgeny Krupnov thanked Nureddin Akhriev for his help in the foreword of the work Srednevokavaya Ingushetia (published in 1971):

"With special gratitude, I must also mention the help of N. G. Akhriev, an expert on the Ingush language and way of life, who reviewed my manuscript and made a number of valuable comments in it." (Note: See Крупнов 1971, pp. 26, 36 (note 56), 38, 86 (note 54), 186 (note 23) for the comments.)

== Family and friends ==
Nureddin was married to an Ossetian woman named Reynat (Ekaterina) Ramonovna; her brother was Nikolai Ramonov. Nureddin's cousin was Rashid-bek Akhriev, the first Caucasian pilot.

Nureddin personally knew historians like Abdurakhman Avtorkhanov, Evgeny Krupnov; the writers like Khalid Oshaev.

== Death ==
On 14 October 1987, Nureddin died at the age of 83 in Moscow. He was buried in the ancestral village of his family, Furtoug.

== Works ==
=== Main works ===
- Akhriev, N. G. (1957). "О некоторых вопросах движения кавказских горцев в первой половине XIX в." [On some issues of the movement of the Caucasian highlanders in the first half of the 19th century]. In Daniyalov, G. D.; et al. (eds.). Ученые записи [Scholars records] (PDF) (in Russian). Vol. 2. Makhachkala: IIYAL DagFAN SSSR. pp. 52–64.
- Akhriev, N. G. (1975). "Исконные имена чеченцев и ингушей" [Original names of Chechens and Ingush]. Сборник статей и материалов по вопросам нахского языкознания. Известия ЧИНИИИЯЛ [Collection of articles and materials on questions of Nakh linguistics. Izvestia CHINIIIYAL] (in Russian). Vol. 10 (2nd ed.). Grozny: Chech.-Ing. kn. izd-vo. pp. 199–212.

=== As manuscript (unpublished) ===
- Akhriev, N. G. (1940). Влияние Крестовых походов на развитие военного дела в Европе [The influence of the Crusades on the development of military affairs in Europe] (in Russian).
- Akhriev, N. G. (1943). Краткая историческая справка об Азербайджане [Brief historical information about Azerbaijan] (in Russian).
- Akhriev, N. G. Арабская ономастика у народов Северного Кавказа [Arabic onomastics among the peoples of the North Caucasus] (in Russian).

=== Redactions ===
- Abdullaev, M. A. (1968). Akhriev, N. G. (ed.). Из истории философской и общественно-политической мысли народов Дагестана в XIX в. [From the history of philosophical and socio-political thought of the peoples of Dagestan in the 19th century] (in Russian). Moskva: Nauka. pp. 1–336.

== Bibliography ==
=== Russian sources ===
- Vasilkov, Ya. V.; Grishina, A. M.; Perchenok, F. F. (1990). "Репрессированное востоковедение: Востоковеды, подвергшиеся репрессиям в 20—50-е годы" [Repressed Oriental Studies: Orientalists who were subjected to repression in the 20–50s] (PDF). Narody Azii I Afriki (in Russian) (4). SPb.: Peterburgskoe vostokovedinie: 113–125.
- Vasilkov, Ya. V.; Sorokina, M. Yu. (2003). "АХРИЕВ (Ингушский) Нурэддин (Нур-Эддин-бей) Габертович" [Akhriev (Ingush) Nurēddin (Nur-Ēddin-Bey) Gabertovich]. Люди и судьбы. Биобиблиографический словарь востоковедов — жертв политического террора в советский период (1917—1991) [People and destinies. Bio-Bibliographic Dictionary of Orientalists – Victims of Political Terror in the Soviet Period (1917–1991)] (in Russian). SPb.: Peterburgskoe vostokovedinie.
- Gazdiev, A. (2021-06-10). "О, сколько нам открытий чудных" [Oh, how many wonderful discoveries we have]. Serdalo (in Russian). Nazran: Izd-vo Serdalo.
- Dzarakhova, Z. M.-T. (2023-01-13). "К 130-летию со дня рождения: Рашид-Бек Ахриев в истории российской авиации" [To the 130th anniversary of his birth: Rashid-Bek Akhriev in the history of Russian aviation]. Ingushetia (in Russian). GAU redaktsiya gazety "Ingushetia".
- Press-sluzhba Glavy RI (2014-01-14). "Юнус-Бек Евкуров провел встречу с заместителем директора Института стран Азии и Африки при МГУ" [Yunus-Bek Yevkurov held a meeting with the Deputy Director of the Institute of Asian and African Studies at Moscow State University]. ingushetia.ru (in Russian).
- "14 сентября" [14 September]. www.nbri.ru (in Russian). 2023.
- Kartoev, M. M. (2014). Ингушетия в политике Российской империи на Кавказе. XIX век. Сборник документов и материалов [Ingushetia in the policy of the Russian Empire in the Caucasus. 19th century. Collection of documents and materials]. Istoriya Ingushetii: otkrytyy arkhiv (in Russian) (1st ed.). Rostov-Na-Donu: Yuzhnyy izdatelsky dom. pp. 1–604. ISBN 978-5-98864-060-8.
- Kartoev, M. M. (2020). Ингушетия в политике Российской империи на Кавказе. XIX век. Сборник документов и материалов [Ingushetia in the policy of the Russian Empire in the Caucasus. 19th century. Collection of documents and materials]. Istoriya Ingushetii: otkrytyy arkhiv (in Russian) (2nd ed.). Rostov-Na-Donu: Yuzhnyy izdatelsky dom. pp. 1–760. ISBN 978-5-98864-060-8.
- Khalilov, A. M.; Idrisov, M. M. (1998). Шамиль в истории Северного Кавказа и народной памяти [Shamil in the history of the North Caucasus and people's memory] (in Russian). Makhachkala: Dagpress. pp. 1–128.
- Kharsieva, L. (2022-05-08). "Они сражались за Родину: Учителя Ингушетии на фронтах Великой Отечественной войны" [They fought for their Motherland: Teachers of Ingushetia on the fronts of the Great Patriotic War]. Ingushetia (in Russian). GAU redaktsiya gazety "Ingushetia".
- Kadishev, A. B. (1960). Интервенция и гражданская война в Закавказье [Intervention and civil war in Transcaucasia] (in Russian). Moskva: Voenizdat. pp. 1–510.
- Крупнов, Е. И. (1971). Средневековая Ингушетия [Medieval Ingushetia] (in Russian). Москва: Наука. pp. 1–211.
- Malsagov, A. (2009-11-20). Под знаком большого террор [Under the sign of great terror] (in Russian).
- Martirosian, G. K. (1928). Нагорная Ингушия [Upland Ingushiya] (in Russian). Vladikavkaz: Gos. tip. A. O. I. pp. 1–150.
- Ozdoeva, Radimkhan (2007). Арабизмы в ингушской лексике [Arabisms in the Ingush vocabulary] (in Russian). Moscow.
- Ozdoeva, Madina (2018-07-23). "Быть нужным своему народу: Нуреддин Ахриев — человек своей эпохи" [To be needed by your people: Nureddin Akhriev is the man of his era]. Ingushetia (in Russian). GAU redaktsiya gazety "Ingushetia".
- Ozdoeva, Madina (2020-09-14). "Судьба дипломата: Выдающийся ингушский ученый: Нуреддин Ахриев — человек своей эпохи" [The fate of a diplomat: Outstanding Ingush scientist: Nureddin Akhriev - a man of his era]. Ingushetia (in Russian). Magas: GAU redaktsiya gazety "Ingushetia".
- Serdalo (2014-09-14). "Историк, кавказовед и арабист" [Historian, caucasologist and arabist]. Serdalo (in Russian). Nazran: Izd-vo Serdalo. Archived from the original on 2019-01-11.
- Serdalo (2021-06-21). "Сильные духом: Интеллигенция Ингушетии в годы Великой Отечественной войны" [Strong in Spirit: The Intelligentsia of Ingushetia during the Great Patriotic War]. Serdalo (in Russian). Nazran: Izd-vo Serdalo.
- "Неизвестный автор (друг Н.И. Штанько) — Д.Д. Мальсагову" [Unknown author (friend of N.I. Shtanko) to D.D. Malsagov]. Дошлуко Дохович Мальсагов: день за днем. Из эпистолярного наследия [Doshluko Dokhovich Malsagov: day by day. From the epistolary heritage] (PDF) (in Russian). SPb.: MAĒ RAN. 2018 [1964]. pp. 151–152. ISBN 978-5-88431-354-5.
