= Chakh Akhriev =

Ingush academic

Chakh Elmurzievich Akhriev
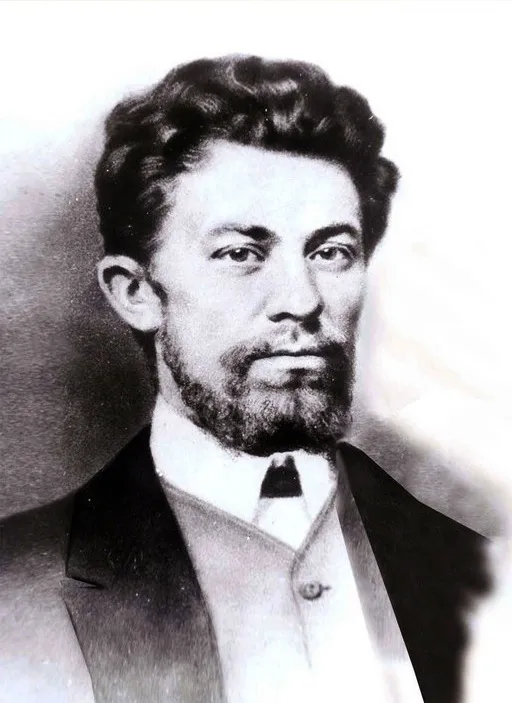
- Akhriev c. 1873
- Born: 22 May 1850 (Note: O.S. 10 May 1850.); Furtoug, Dzherakh
- Died: 12 May 1914 (Note: O.S. 29 April 1914.); Vladikavkaz
- Spouse: Ayshi Bazorkina
- Children: Rashid-bek, Ruslan, Tamara, Nina
- Parents: Elmurza Akhriev (father); Dali Ozieva (mother)
- Relatives: Assadula Akhriev (cousin)

Academic background
- Education: Stavropol classical men's gymnasium (1868); Nizhyn Legal Lyceum (1874)

Academic work
- Discipline: Ethnography and local history
- Military career
- Allegiance: Russian Empire
- Branch: Imperial Russian Army
- Rank: Colonel

Chakh Elmurzievich Akhriev (Note: Russian: Чах Эльмурзиевич Ахриев; (Note: Pre-reform orthography: Чахъ Эльмурзіевичъ Ахріевъ.) Ingush: Оахаранаькъан Элмарзий ЧхьагӀа, romanized: Oakharanäqhan Ēlmarziy Chh'agha.) (22 May [O.S. 10 May] 1850 – 12 May [O.S. 29 April] 1914) was the first Ingush ethnographer and a lawyer by education, who recorded Ingush folklore, mythology, and culture.

Akhriev was born in Furtoug and became an amanat (mountain hostage) (Note: Mountaineers-hostages, who, by their stay among the Russians, guaranteed loyalty to Russia.) at the age of seven. He entered a military cantonist school, where Akhriev studied from 1857 to 1862. From 1862 to 1868, he studied at the Stavropol Gymnasium, after which he returned to Furtoug, and started collecting folklore and ethnographic materials. In 1870s, he published some of those ethnographic works in Collection of information about the Caucasian highlanders and the newspaper Terskie vedomosti. From 1870 to 1874, Akhriev studied at the Nizhyn Lyceum, after which he relocated to Elizavetpol Governorate, where he worked for the administrative authorities of the cities of Yevlakh and Nukha. Akhriev continued working until 1912, when he resigned due to illness. He returned to Vladikavkaz, where he died on 12 May 1914.

== Early life ==
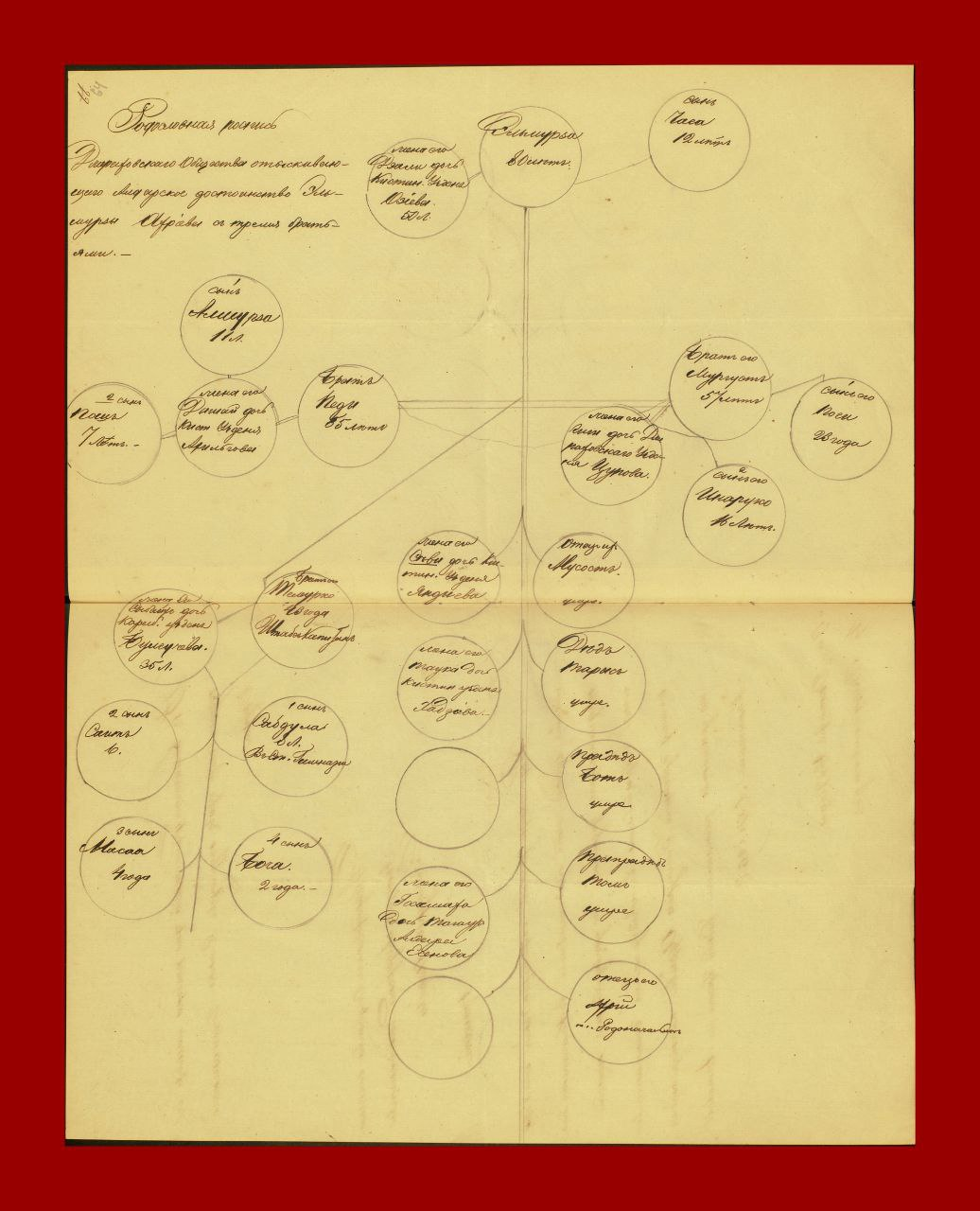
Family tree of Elmurza, Peda, Murgust and Temurko Akhrievs (in Russian). Chakh Akhriev is indicated as "Chaga (12 year old)".

Akhriev was born on 10 May 1850, in the village of Furtoug, Vladikavkazsky okrug of the Terek Oblast. His father was Elmurza Akhriev, while his mother was Dzali Ozieva. Akhriev himself was an ethnic Ingush of the Akhriev family, which in turn was part of the Dzherakh clan (teip). In the family he had four older sisters; his cousin was Assadula Akhriev, a prominent Ingush researcher and revolutionary.

In 1857 seven-year-old Chakh Akhriev, along with other Ingush boys of the Akhievs and Lyanovs, became amanat (mountaineer hostage). He was taken to Vladikavkaz Fortress, where he entered a military cantonist school from 1857 to 1862. Thanks to the assistance of his uncle Temurko Akhriev, an officer in the Imperial Russian Army, Akhriev's position in Vladikavkaz was somewhat better than other hostage children; he was respected by the Russian authorities and had more freedom.

From 1862 to 1868, Akhriev studied at Stavropol Gymnasium, at which many Caucasian intellectuals began their creative and scientific careers, including the Ingush intellectual Adil-Girey Dolgiev. During the 1860s and 1870s, the historical and ethnographic study of the North Caucasus and Caucasian studies were encouraged in the Russian Empire, and branches of All-Russian scientific societies were opened. During these years, fundamental studies of scientists Adolf Berzhe, Pyotr Butkov, Nikolay Dubrovin and others began to be published. Akhriev engaged with Russian culture and was among the leading people of his time.

== Ethnography career ==
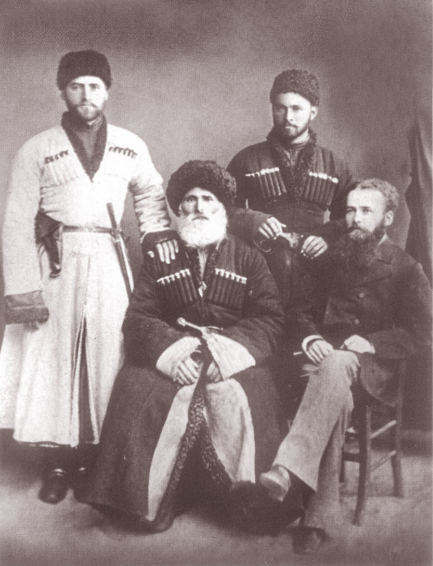
Akhriev sitting on the right.

After graduating from high school in 1868, Akhriev spent two years in Furtoug due to illness. During this period, he collected folklore and ethnographic materials, and published some of the ethnographic works in Collection of information about the Caucasian highlanders and the newspaper Terskie vedomosti.

Akhriev's informants were the elders of the mountain villages of Ingushetia who witnessed the events and ceremonies of 18th-century Ingush culture and remembered stories about the lifves of their 17th-century ancestors. Akhriev was the first to describe the elements of the Ingush Nart saga.

From 1870 to 1874, he studied at Nizhyn Lyceum. After his graduation, he was in unofficial exile in Elizavetpol Governorate for his criticism of Tsarist policies in the Caucasus. There, he worked in administrative bodies of the cities of Yevlakh and Nukha.

== Later life ==
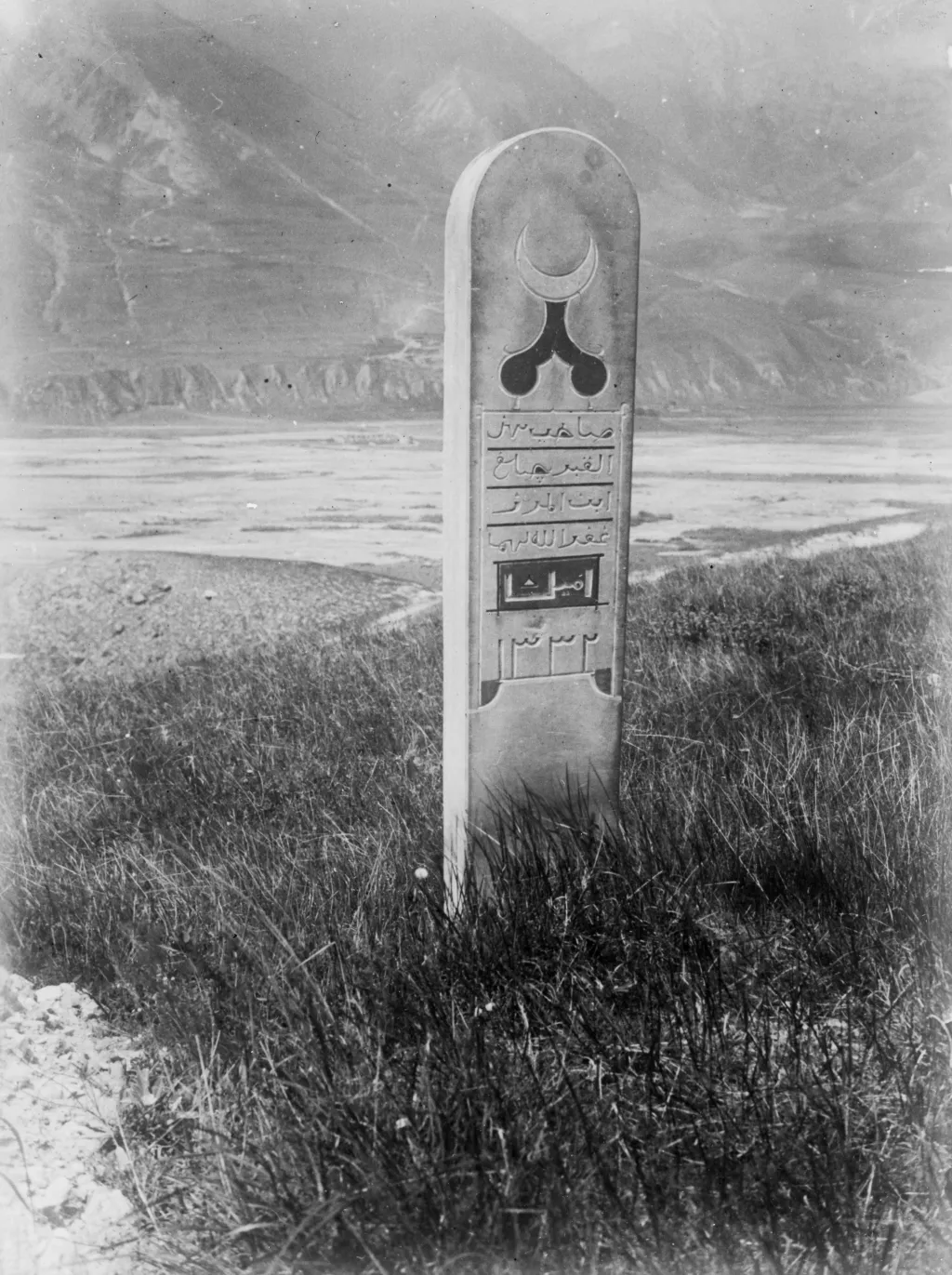
Headstone at the grave of Akhriev in 1928.

On 16 October 1874, Akhriev was appointed a candidate for judicial office at the Tiflis Court of Justice and for eight years, he worked as a candidate for judicial office, assistant magistrate and forensic investigator. On 24 November 1882, Akhriev was appointed an agent for managing state property in the districts of the Elizavetpol Governorate, and from 31 January 1889, he worked as an official on special assignments to supervise the populated lands and quitrent articles. (Note: Quitrent articles—state-owned real estate in Russian Empire, which was received in quitrent, at public auction or maintenance; if the auctions failed, the real estate was subordinated to the economic management of the Ministry of Agriculture and State Property.) From 27 May 1897, Akhriev was director of the Nukha branch of the committee of prison custodians. From 23 October 1900, he worked as a junior overseer for the state lands and quitrent articles of the Elizavetpol Governate.

Akhriev suffered from chronic diabetes and homesickness. On 28 September 1912, he submitted a resignation letter due to poor health, and he was dismissed from the rank of collegiate counselor. He returned with his family to Vladikavkaz, where he spent the rest of his life. Akhriev died on 29 April 1914, and was buried according to Islamic burial customs in Furtoug, his native village.

== Views ==
Akhriev often highlighted the position of an Ingush woman in his works, and he dedicated a separate essay about it. According to him, compared to other peoples, the Ingush woman has relatively greater freedom, but at the same time she has to work a lot. Akhriev also believes that being free from physical labor does not yet mean true freedom. Furthermore, he states that the position of an Ingush woman varies in different periods of her life. According to Akhriev, Islam further constrained the position of women and men.

Akhriev's views on Ingush men are often contradictory and erroneous. His essay On the Character of the Ingush is the first attempt to describe the complex issue. Akhriev sees character as a category that changes under the influence of various factors. According to him, in the past, a man's warlike life put him in a freer attitude towards work; rich nature has a very beneficial effect. Furthermore, Akhriev sees the influence of the conquerors-Tatar-Mongols, the spread of Islam, as well as the difficult economic conditions of the Ingush people's life, as damaging to the Ingush character.

Akhriev had a negative attitude towards the new religion of Ingush, Islam, and saw Ingush paganism as a past stage. His progressive views, however, do not indicate that he was an atheist and took a materialist position; some of his progressive views were on par with the views of Russian revolutionary democrats.

== Family ==
Akhriev was married to Ayshi Bazorkina, daughter of Mochqo Bazorkin. They had six children, of whom two boys died in childhood. The children spent their childhood in Azerbaijan's Elizavetpol Governorate, where Akhriev lived after being exiled. Akhriev's daughter Tamara was the first Ingush woman to become a teacher and she ran a Russian-Muslim school in Baku for some time. She died at a young age. Akhriev's son Ruslan served in the police and died in a fight with bandits during the Russian Civil War of the 1920s. Akhriev's son Rashid-Bek became an aviator of the Soviet Air Forces and was the first pilot to originate in the North Caucasus region. He died near Leningrad during World War Two. Akhriev's daughter Nina Akhrieva became an ethnographer.

== Legacy and assessment ==
From 1994, "Akhriev readings" are held in the Ingush Research Institute of the Humanities, which in 2001 was named in honor of Akhriev.

On 26 January 2005, Akhriev was posthumously awarded the Order of Merit for "outstanding services in the field of ethnography and many years of scientific activity" by Murat Zyazikov.

According to professor of North Ossetian State University Leonid Semyonov:

Chakh Akhriev's works are ethnographic in nature and varied in topics. The author is interested in both general questions (the nature of the Ingush epic, the origin of the Ingush) and special ones (the Ingush oath, Ingush kashes [graves]). He pays attention to both the distant past of his region and its present. All his notes and articles are very informative, revealing the author’s excellent acquaintance with the spirit of the country, with the peculiarities of its unique way of life and ancient culture.

Professor of Ingush Research Institute of the Humanities Ibragim Dakhkilgov: said:

Chakh Elmurzievich Akhriev is rightfully our national pride. In the difficult 70s of the 19th century, he recorded and published invaluable materials on the ethnography and folklore of the Ingush people, and carried out a number of scientific studies that were very valuable for Ingush studies. His legacy is of great importance not only for the history, sociology and folkloristics of his people, but also for all Caucasian studies.

Ingush writer and poet Vakha Khamkhoev wrote:

He [Chakh Akhriev], like his contemporaries Adil-Girey Dolgiev, Inal Bekbuzarov, Aslanbek Bazorkin, Saadulla Akhriev, made his worthy contribution to the education of his people.

== Works ==
=== In historiography ===
During Akhriev's lifetime, scientists, scholars, archaeologists, ethnographers, and Russian lawyers such as Fyodor Leontovich, Bashir Dalgat and Maksim Kovalevsky referred to his works in their studies.

Akhriev's works that contained newly recorded legends about the emergence of Ingush societies and the founding of some auls, along with materials about the Chechens collected by Adolf Berge and Umalat Laudaev, served as the only primary sources the first Soviet authors incorrectly used to judge the histories of the Chechens and Ingush. This use of legends was a problem because no single picture emerged due to each community and teip having its own unrelated traditions. The typical features of the legends were that in the Middle Ages, the Chechens and Ingush arrived at their modern lands from somewhere else, and that the ancestors of individual teips came from very different regions, such as Georgia, Syria and Persia.

=== List of works ===
- Akhriev, Ch. E. (1870). "Похороны и поминки у горцев" [Funeral and commemoration at the highlanders]. Сборник сведений о кавказских горцах [Collection of information about the Caucasian highlanders] (in Russian) (2nd ed.). Tiflis. pp. 28–32.
- Akhriev, Ch. E. (1870). "Несколько слов о героях в ингушских сказаниях" [A few words about the heroes in Ingush legends]. Сборник сведений о кавказских горцах [Collection of information about the Caucasian highlanders] (in Russian) (4th ed.). Tiflis. pp. 1–33 (dep. 2).
- Akhriev, Ch. E. (1871). "Из чеченских сказаний" [From Chechen legends]. Сборник сведений о кавказских горцах [Collection of information about the Caucasian highlanders] (in Russian) (5th ed.). Tiflis. pp. 38–46 (dep. II, § 2).
- Akhriev, Ch. E. (1871). "Ингушские праздники" [Ingush holidays]. Сборник сведений о кавказских горцах [Collection of information about the Caucasian highlanders] (in Russian) (5th ed.). Tiflis. pp. 1–16 (dep. 3, § 2).
- Akhriev, Ch. E. (1871). "Об ингушских кашах (фамильных склепах знатных родов)" [About Ingush kashes (family crypts of noble families)]. Terskie vedomsti (in Russian). No. 17. Vladikavkaz.
- Akhriev, Ch. E. (1871). "Присяга у ингушей" [The oath of the Ingush]. Terskie vedomsti (in Russian). No. 20. Vladikavkaz.
- Akhriev, Ch. E. (1871). "Нравственное значение присяги у ингушей" [The moral meaning of the oath of the Ingush]. Terskie vedomsti (in Russian). No. 21. Vladikavkaz.
- Akhriev, Ch. E. (1871). "О характере ингушей" [On the nature of the Ingush]. Terskie vedomsti (in Russian). No. 30. Vladikavkaz.
- Akhriev, Ch. E. (1871). "Об ингушских женщинах" [About Ingush women]. Terskie vedomsti (in Russian). No. 31. Vladikavkaz.
- Akhriev, Ch. E. (1872). "Этнографический очерк ингушского народа с приложением его сказок и преданий" [Ethnographic sketch of the Ingush people with the application of its tales and legends]. Terskie vedomsti (in Russian). No. 27–35, 39, 42, 43, 45–49. Vladikavkaz.
- Akhriev, Ch. E. (1873). "Этнографический очерк ингушского народа с приложением его сказок и преданий" [Ethnographic sketch of the Ingush people with the application of its tales and legends]. Terskie vedomsti (in Russian). No. 3, 21, 22, 24–26. Vladikavkaz.
- Akhriev, Ch. E. (1875). "Ингуши. Их предания, верования и поверья" [Ingush. Their legends, beliefs and beliefs]. Сборник сведений о кавказских горцах [Collection of information about the Caucasian highlanders] (in Russian) (8th ed.). Tiflis. pp. 1–40 (dept. 1).
- Akhriev, Ch. E. (1878). "Заметки об ингушах («О характере ингушей», «Присяга у ингушей», «Об ингушских женщинах», «Ингушские каши»)" [Notes about the Ingush ("On the character of the Ingush", "The oath of the Ingush", "On Ingush women", "Ingush kashes")]. Сборник сведений о Терской области [Collection of information about the Terek Oblast] (in Russian) (1 ed.). Vladikavkaz. pp. 276–290.

== Sources ==
=== English sources ===
- Baddeley, John F. (1940). The Rugged Flanks of Caucasus. Vol. 1. London: Oxford University Press: Humphrey Milford. pp. 1–318.

=== Russian sources ===
- Akhriev, Kh. R.-B. (1999-06-25). Мой дед — Чах Эльмурзиевич Ахриев [My grandfather - Chakh Elmurzievich Akhriev]. Nalchik.
- Akhrieva, N. Ch. (1968). "Воспоминания об отце" [Memories of Father]. Ингушский просветитель Чах Ахриев [Ingush educator Chakh Akhriev] (in Russian). Grozny: Chech.-Ing. kn. izd-vo.
- Albogachieva, Makka (2022-11-21). "Ахриев Чах Эльмурзиевич" [Akhriev Chakh Elmurzievich]. Great Russian Encyclopedia (in Russian).
- Dakhkilgov, I. A. (1975). Zyazikov, A. A. (ed.). Ингушская литература (период развития до 40-х годов) [Ingush literature (period of development until the 40s)] (in Russian). Grozny: Chech.-Ing. kn. izd-vo. pp. 1–186.
- Dakhkilgov, I. A. (2000). "Он стоял у истоков ингушской науки" [He stood at the origins of Ingush science]. Чах Ахриев. Избранное [Chakh Akhriev. Favorites] (in Russian). Nazran. pp. 1–.
- Dakhkilgov, Sh. E-Kh. (1991). Zyazikov, A. A. (ed.). Происхождение ингушских фамилий [Origin of Ingush surnames] (in Russian). Grozny: Kniga. pp. 1–108.
- Dolgieva, M. B. (2019). "Чах Эльмурзиевич Ахриев: Жизненный путь и творческое наследие" [Chakh Elmurzievich Akhriev: Life path and creative work heritage]. Sovremennaya Nauchnaya Mysl (in Russian) (6). Moskva: ANO "Nauchno-issledovatelsky institut istorii, ekonomiki I prava": 36–41. ISSN 2308-264X.
- Donogo, Kh. M. (2019-12-25). "Аманаты. Заложники большой политики" [Amanates. Hostages of big politics]. www.gazavat.ru (in Russian).
- Dzarakhova, Z. M.-T. (2010-12-08). "Чах Ахриев и этнография ингушей (к 160-летию со дня рождения)" [Chakh Akhriev and the ethnography of the Ingush (on the 160th anniversary of his birth)]. Serdalo (in Russian). Nazran: Izd-vo Serdalo.
- Dzarakhova, Z. M.-T. (2020-05-11). "К юбилею ученого: Чах Ахриев. Жизнь и творчество (к 170-летию со дня рождения)" [On the anniversary of the scientist: Chakh Akhriev. Life and creativity (to the 170th anniversary of his birth)]. Ingushetia (in Russian). GAU redaktsiya gazety "Ingushetia".
- Khamkhoev, V. V. (1990). "Чаху Ахриеву — 140 лет" [Chakh Akhriev is 140 years old]. Dosh (in Russian). No. 2. pp. 8–12.
- Kosven, M. O. (1958). "Материалы по истории этнографического изучения Кавказа в русской науке. Часть 2" [Materials on the history of ethnographic study of the Caucasus in Russian science. Part 2]. In Kosven, M. O. (ed.). Кавказский этнографический сборник [Caucasian ethnographic collection] (in Russian). Vol. 2. Moskva: Nauka. pp. 139–274.
- Krupnov, E. I. (1971). Средневековая Ингушетия [Medieval Ingushetia] (in Russian). Moskva: Nauka. pp. 1–211.
- Malsagov, A. O. (1933). Библиографический справочник по ингушской художественной литературе [Bibliographic reference book on Ingush literature] (in Russian). Ordzhonikidze: Serdalo. pp. 13–15.
- Maklashesky, Ivan (1897). "Оброчные статьи" [Quitrent articles]. Brockhaus and Efron Encyclopedic Dictionary (in Russian). Saint Petersburg. p. 577.
- Semyonov, L. P. (1928). Чах Ахриев [Chakh Akhriev] (in Russian). Vladikavkaz: Gos. tip. A. O. I. pp. 1–12.
- Shnirelman, V. A. (2006). Kalinin, I. (ed.). Быть Аланами: Интеллектуалы и политика на Северном Кавказе в XX веке [To be Alans: Intellectuals and Politics in the North Caucasus in the 20th Century] (in Russian). Moskva: Novoe literaturnoe obozrenie. pp. 1–348. ISBN 5-86793-406-3. ISSN 1813-6583.
- Smirnov, I. A.; Bokov, Kh. Kh.; Vinogradov, V. B.; Goygova, Z. A.-G.; Gritsenko, V. N.; Krupnov, E. I.; Salamov, A. A.; Samarzin, V. S.; Topakalyan, N. A.; Chentieva, M. L., eds. (1967). Очерки истории Чечено-Ингушской АССР [Essays on the history of the Chechen-Ingush ASSR] (in Russian). Vol. 1. Grozny: Chech.-Ing. kn. izd-vo.
- "Указ Президента РИ "О награждении орденом "За заслуги" Ахриева Ч.Э."" [Decree of the President of the Republic of Ingushetia "On awarding the Order of Merit to Ch. E. Akhriev."] (in Russian). Magas, Ingushetia. 2005-02-09 [2005-01-26].
- Velikaya, N. N.; Vinogradov, V. B. (1989). Chistov, K. V. (ed.). "Доисламский религиозный синкретизм у вайнахов" [Pre-Islamic religious syncretism among the Vainakhs]. Sovetskaya etnografia [Soviet Ethnography] (in Russian). No. 3. Moskva: Nauka. pp. 39–48.
- Yandarov, A. D. (1968). Ингушский просветитель Чах Ахриев [Ingush educator Chakh Akhriev] (in Russian). Grozny: Chech.-Ing. kn. izd-vo.
- Yandarov, Andarbek (July–August 1971). Petrova-Averkieva, Julia; et al. (eds.). "Первый ингушский этнограф Чах Ахриев (К 120-летию со дня рождения)" [The first Ingush ethnographer Chakh Akhriev (To the 120th anniversary of his birth)]. Soviet Ethnography (in Russian) (4). Moscow: Nauka: 127–130.
