= Idris Bazorkin =

North Caucasian writer and playwright (1910–1993)

- Байсаранаькъан Идрис
- Born: 15 June 1910 (Note: O.S. 3 June 1910.); Bazorkino, Nazran okrug, Terek Oblast, Russian Empire
- Died: 31 May 1993 (aged 82); Grozny, Chechen Republic of Ichkeria
- Resting place: Egikal, Ingushetia, Russia
- Education: Pedagogical Institute of Vladikavkaz (1933)
- Occupations: writer, playwright, poet
- Writing career
- Language: Russian (mostly), Ingush
- Years active: 1927–1993
- Period: (1927–1993)
- Genres: historical fiction, literary realism
- Notable work: From the Darkness of Ages (1968)
- Notable awards: People's Writer of Checheno-Ingushetia (11.09.1990); Order of Friendship of Peoples (15.08.1991)

Idris Murtuzovich Bazorkin (Note: Russian: Идрис Муртузович Базоркин, IPA: [ɪdrʲɪs mʊrtʊzəvʲɪd͡ʑ bəzərkʲɪn]; Ingush: Байсаранаькъан Муртаза Идрис, romanized: Baysaranäqhan Murtaza Idris) (15 June [O.S. 3 June] 1910 – 31 May 1993) was a North Caucasian writer, playwright, poet and statesman who mainly wrote his works in Russian but also in Ingush to a lesser degree. He had been recognized a classic of the Ingush literature during his lifetime.

Having graduated from the North Caucasus Pedagogical Institute in Vladikavkaz (1933), Idris worked as a teacher. In the following year Idris participated in the First Congress of Soviet Writers and was accepted into the newly formed Union of Soviet Writers. In 1944 Idris entered the Communist Party of the Soviet Union. Deported to Kyrgyz SSR in 1944, Idris worked there as an administrator of the Frunze Opera and Ballet Theater. In 1957 Idris led a national movement of the Chechen and Ingush peoples. After the Grozny rally of 1973, one of whose leaders was Idris, accused of nationalism, was expelled from the Communist Party, his books were removed from libraries, and his name was deleted from textbooks and anthologies. During the East Prigorodny conflict of 1992, Idris was taken hostage by North Ossetian gangs, and his personal property was exported and never returned. In November 1992, immediately after the end of the armed phase of the conflict, Idris was taken to Ingushetia. He died in Grozny on 31 May 1993 and was buried in the family village of Egikal in Ingushetia.

Idris was acquaintanced for the first time with literature by writing poetry for the handwritten magazine Red Sprouts during his studies at the preparatory department of the Ingush Pedagogical College in Vladikavkaz. From 1928, his works began publishing. Bazorkin was a pioneer in many genres in the Ingush literature: he wrote the first multi-act play At Dawn (На заре; 1934), modern literary fairy tale Kuni (Куни; 1957), an adventure story Call (Призыв; 1958), a film script Labor and Roses (Труды и розы; 1963) and a historical novel/an epic novel (Note: According to Yandieva 1990, p. 37, Yandieva 2005, Gould 2016, pp. 88, 91, 94, 97 & Gould 2020, p. 404 the work is a historical novel; according to Patiev 2001, pp. 3, 14 & Gorchkhanova 2016, p. 130 it is an epic novel.) From the Darkness of Ages (Из тьмы веков; 1968), his magnum opus, which became not only his main book, but also the main book of the entire Ingush literature. Although there were already novels in Ingush literature, Idris, however, gave this genre a large-scale epic character with From the Darkness of Ages.

== Life ==
=== Early life ===
Born on 15 June 1910 in Bazorkino, Russian Empire, in the family of the tsarist officer Murtuz-Ali, Idris was of Ingush background. Murtuz-Ali, not wanting to come under Soviet rule, emigrated to Qajar Iran during the Russian Civil War and died there in 1924. Idris' grandfather, Bunukho, was one of the first Ingush generals of the tsarist army; his granduncle was the founder of Idris' native village of Bazorkino, Mochko Bazorkin. The Bazorkin branch of the Gazdiev family came from the village of Egikal in mountainous Ingushetia. Idris' mother Gretta, a daughter of the Swiss engineer Louis de Ratzé, who worked in Vladikavkaz, instilled in Idris the foundations of Russian and Western European cultures. Not wanting to emigrate with her husband to Iran, she remained in Vladikavkaz where she died in 1923.

At first, Idris studied in the preparatory class of a gymnasium in Vladikavkaz, but being affected by the Russian Civil War (Note: Idris' native village, Bazorkino, was burned and plundered by the Denikinites; Ten-year-old Idris' apartment in Vladikavkaz was robbed at gunpoint by Bicherakhov's detachments in 1920.) he was forced to continue further studies in a madrasah of his native village, Bazorkino, the impressions from which later formed the basis of one of his first stories, Boang (lit. 'Trap'). In 1924, Bazorkin entered the preparatory department of the Ingush Pedagogical College in Vladikavkaz. While there, Idris for the first began acquaintanced with literature by writing poetry for the handwritten magazine Red Sprouts, organized by Victoria Abramova and Tembot Bekov. One of Idris' teachers was a professor and linguist Mikhail Nemirovsky who offered Idris to become his student and heir by becoming a linguist. Idris, not wanting to give up literary activity, refused the offer.

=== Post-graduation from the College ===
In 1930, after graduating from the college, Bazorkin entered the Social and Literary Department of the North Caucasus Pedagogical Institute in Vladikavkaz. During his study years, Idris wrote stories, plays, poems and articles. In 1932, Bazorkin, in collaboration with Mukharbek Shadiev, published a textbook of the Ingush language for 1st grade in rural schools. The drawings for the publication were also made by Bazorkin. In 1933, in collaboration with A. Akhriev and Akhmet Oziev, he published a primer for rural schools.

In 1932–1934, Idris combined his studies in Vladikavkaz with work as a teacher in the villages of mountainous Ingushetia. A significant year for Bazorkin was 1934 as he participated in the First Congress of Soviet Writers as a delegate from Checheno-Ingushetia, where he met the writer Maxim Gorky and was accepted into the newly formed Union of Writers of the USSR.

In 1934–1935, Bazorkin, together with the Chechen-Ingush Theater Studio, underwent an internship at the Tbilisi State Theater named after Shota Rustaveli. In 1935–1938, he worked as the head teacher of the Pedagogical Workers' Faculty in Ordzhonikidze.

In 1934, with the merging of Ingush Autonomous Oblast and Chechen Autonomous Oblast into Checheno-Ingush Autonomous Oblast, Bazorkin, like most of the Ingush intelligentsia, was forced to move from Ordzhonikidze to Grozny in 1938. There he worked as the head of the Literary Department of the Checheno-Ingush State Drama Theater.

With the beginning of the Great Patriotic War, the main theme of Bazorkin's work became fight against the Nazis and victory over them. Being a full-time lecturer for the regional party committee and a correspondent for republican newspapers and radio, he, together with his colleagues, travelled to the cities and villages of Checheno-Ingushetia, Kabardino-Balkaria, North Ossetia, where he spoke to soldiers and the population of front-line and rear settlements on the radio, and wrote essays and articles in the press and works with characteristic titles about the deeds of the Nazis on their native land like "We will not forgive!", "The face of the enemy", "At the open grave", "The anger of the people", "The honor of a mountain woman", "Son of the Motherland", "A word to the Chechen-Ingush intelligentsia" and "They will not pass". In 1943, due to the retreat of German troops from the territory of Checheno-Ingushetia, Idris decided to switch exclusively to literary work. In 1944 Idris joined the Communist Party of the Soviet Union.

=== In exile ===
On 23 February 1944, the Chechen and Ingush were deported to Kazakh SSR and Kyrgyz SSR. Idris was deported to Kyrgyz SSR where he began working as an administrator of the Frunze Opera and Ballet Theater. It was forbidden for exiled writers to write and publish at that time, so Bazorkin resorted to collecting material for his works, hoping for further rehabilitation.

The deported peoples, especially after the 20th Congress of the Communist Party of the Soviet Union, began to hope that justice would be restored to them. In Kazakhstan and Kyrgyzstan, a national movement for returning to the homeland began, the informal leader of which was Idris, who at that time worked as the chief administrator of the State Kyrgyz Opera and Ballet Theater. On 9 June 1956, together with Chechen linguist Iunus Desheriev as a co-head of a group of Checheno-Ingush representatives, Idris arrived in Moscow to meet with the First Deputy Chairman of the Council of Ministers of the Soviet Union, Anastas Mikoyan. Mikoyan promised the delegation to multiply their letters and send them to all members of the Soviet Government and assist in the restoration of the Checheno-Ingush Autonomous Soviet Socialist Republic. On 24 November 1956, the Central Committee of the Communist Party of the Soviet Union adopted a resolution "On the restoration of the national autonomy of the Kalmyk, Karachay, Balkar, Chechen and Ingush peoples". In September 1956, a group of Ingush writers and other representatives of the intelligentsia, among whom was Idris, sent an appeal to the Presidium of the Board of the Union of Soviet writers in which they petitioned for "the return of the Ingush people to the fraternal family of Soviet peoples and the restoration of the autonomy of the Ingush and Chechens". The appeal received a great response among the Communist Party's bureaucracy, since it was forwarded by the secretary of the Board A. Surkov to the Central Committee of the Communist Party of the Soviet Union. Such initiatives of the Ingush intelligentsia had a certain positive impact on the country's leadership making the decision to restore the Checheno-Ingush Autonomous Soviet Socialist Republic.

=== Return ===
In 1957, Idris returned to Grozny. At the end of 1972, Bazorkin initiated a collective letter to the Central Committee of the Communist Party of the Soviet Union, in which he raised the issue of returning the Prigorodny District of North Ossetia to the jurisdiction of the Chechen-Ingush Autonomous Soviet Socialist Republic.

Constant discrimination of the Ingush in the Prigorodny District forced them to organize a rally in Grozny on 16–19 January 1973, at which they demanded that the Soviet authorities solve the problem of the Prigorodny region and provide the Ingush with social equality with the Ossetians. One of the leaders of this movement was Bazorkin. Despite the fact that the rally was peaceful, held under the slogans of "friendship of peoples", "restoration of Leninist norms" with the Ingush themselves maintaining order, they did not receive any reaction from the authorities and the rally ended in clashes with the police and the condemnation of its most active participants. Thus, the organizers of the rally, including Bazorkin, were accused of nationalism. Bazorkin was expelled from the Communist Party, his books were removed from libraries, and his name was deleted from textbooks and anthologies. (Note: For instance, Soviet Censorship removed an entire chapter from Ibragim Dakhkilgov's monograph Ingush literature (period of development until the 40s) (Ингушская литература (период развития до 40-х годов); 1978) dedicated to Idris, as any mention of his name in the press was prohibited.)

According to Bazorkin himself, after the rally, conditions of Ingush in the Prigorodny District improved somewhat. Ingush language appeared in schools, literature in the Ingush language arrived in the region, broadcasts in the Ingush language began on radio and television, for the first time Ingush deputies appeared in the Ordzhonikidze City Executive Committee and the Prigorodny District Executive Committee. However, much remained the same: authorities continued to limit the registration of Ingush in the district, Ingush children couldn't receive a normal education, discrimination in employment continued and Ingush were negatively portrayed in historical and fiction literature.

Idris participated in the Second Congress of the Ingush people on 9–10 October 1989 as a delegate.

=== Last years ===
During the East Prigorodny conflict in the Prigorodny region of North Ossetia and in Vladikavkaz in October–November 1992, Idris was taken hostage by North Ossetian gangs, and his personal property, which included the manuscript of the continuation of the epic novel, was exported by unidentified persons. According to neighbors, four people in civilian clothes, accompanied by a platoon of fully equipped armed soldiers, arrived to Idris' apartment in a passenger car and a UAZ military minibus, and stole from his apartment several large cardboard boxes full of papers. The fate of the manuscripts is still unknown. Part of Idris' family archive (two albums with photographs) was returned and handed over to Mukharbek Didigov, the then Chairman of the Government of Ingushetia, in 1995.

In November 1992, immediately after the end of the armed phase of the conflict, Idris was taken to Ingushetia. He died in Grozny on 31 May 1993. He was buried in the family village of Egikal.

== Works ==
Idris wrote mainly in Russian and to a lesser degree Ingush. According to writer Yakub Patiev, even his Russian language works feel as if they were written in Ingush. Khanifa Martazanova, a professor of Ingush literature at Ingush State University, characterized Idris' works by having "thematic richness, diversity of genre forms, and artistic perfection" and being "closely connected with the everyday life of the [Ingush] people, with its past and present, with the spiritual demands of the time, [...] pos[ing] and solv[ing] problems that were important, relevant in nature, global and deep in their essence and content"; and his prose works also showing a great interest in the concept of man, the world, and history.

=== From the Darkness of Ages ===
Idris' magnum opus is considered his historical novel/epic novel From the Darkness of Ages (Из тьмы веков, Iz t'my vekov; 1968), written by him in Dzheyrakh, a mountainous village in Ingushetia, near which much of the story takes place, from 16 August 1965 to 10 February 1967. Based on rich folkloric, ethnographic, historical and documentary material about life of the Ingush in the second half of 19th – beginning of 20th century life, the novel's purpose was to describe the most important moments of national history of the Ingush from the point of view of social struggle and the principle of historicism. Liliia Kharsieva compares the work's significance for Ingush people in terms of historical significance and philosophical understanding of reality with Leo Tolstoy's War and Peace's (Война и мир; 1869) significance for Russian people. According to Patiev, the main theme of the novel is optimism (good faith in the future), which according to him, for the Ingush people, who have been not once deported and resettled, is the most precious feeling, necessary today.

The novel became not only the main book of Idris during his lifetime, but also the main book of all Ingush literature, in which activated Idris' talent in connecting historical fact and artistic fiction, writing a broad epic view of history, personality and exploring the deep layers of human character. Although there were already novels in Ingush literature, Idris, however, gave this genre a large-scale epic character with From the Darkness of Ages. Amongst readers arose opinion that the novel is an encyclopedia of the life of the Ingush people during the second half of the 19th century but Idris refused such a definition.

=== Plays ===
Idris also wrote a number of plays. Among them is his first play At dawn (На заре; 1934), which is not only the first multi-act play by an Ingush writer and playwright, written about the Ingush people and staged by a professional theater, but also the first heroic drama about the life of the Ingush people. His family drama Tamara (Тамара; 1938) is the first Ingush play, which highlighted the issues of class relations between people in the 1920-30s and the problems of dealing with the remnants of the past, which put Caucasian women in difficult conditions. It was also the first play in Ingush literature to realistically portray a woman. During the Great Patriotic War, Idris' one-act play In These Days (В эти дни; 1941) passionately called on the population of Checheno-Ingushetia to fight off Nazi Germany while his other one-act play of three scenes Captain Ibragimov, or My Answer (Капитан Ибрагимов, или Мой ответ, later The Birth of Hatred (Рождение ненависти); 1941–1942) talked about the heroic deeds of his fellow countrymen during the War, and has remained one of the most significant works of Checheno-Ingush literature about the period of the Great Patriotic War. For the play Operation (Операция; written in 1949, published in 1957) Idris received an honorable mention at a republican competition in Kyrgyzstan.

=== Other works ===
Idris also wrote Singer (Назманч; 1934), a collection of poems and stories; Kuni (Куни; 1957), which is the first modern fairy tale for children in Ingush literature; the first repertoire collection for amateur artistic circles in the Ingush language; biographical essay of Makhmud Esambayev, The Artist's Path (Путь артиста; 1958); the historical story The Call (Призыв; 1958), which is about the events of Russian Civil War that took place at the beginning of 1918 in the city of Vladikavkaz.

Idris also wrote film drama. His film script Labor and Roses (Труд и розы; 1958), was the first film script in the Ingush literature. Based on it, the film studio Azerbaijanfilm made the film I will dance! (Я буду танцевать!; 1962). For this work he received a Certificate of Honor from the Presidium of the Supreme Council of the Chechen-Ingush Autonomous Soviet Socialist Republic in 1963. In 1966, Bazorkin also wrote a new film script and play called Roads of Love (Дороги любви), which is about an unsuccessful relationship between two young people, Dota and Adil. The image of Dota, a purposeful and active character, was a new phenomenon in the drama of Ingush literature.

== Awards ==
- People's Writer of Checheno-Ingushetia (11.09.1990)
- Order of Friendship of Peoples (15.08.1991)

== Legacy and assessment ==
Described by Khanifa Martazanova as having a "multifaceted artistic talent", Idris was recognized a classic of the Ingush literature during his lifetime, with some contemporary scholars like Rebecca Gould even declaring him the founder of modern Ingush literature.

A decree "On perpetuating the memory of the writer Idris Bazorkin" was issued by the Government of Ingushetia at the beginning of May 1994 which made 31 May an official day of remembrance of Idris in the republic. The Ingush State Drama Theater of the Republic of Ingushetia is named after Idris. An avenue in Nazran is named after Idris; the same avenue had a bust of Idris' book From the Darkness of Ages installed by Nikolai Dzukaev on 2 April 2018. On 27 July a bust of Idris Bazorkin was installed by Ibragim Polonkoev in the "Alley of Writers of All Nations, who write in Cyrillic" of the "Cyrillic Courtyard" in the town of Pliska, Bulgaria.

== Sources ==
=== In English ===
- Bazorkin, Idris (2010). Grant, Bruce; Barker, Adele (eds.). "Evening Prayers". The Russia Reader: Culture, History, Politics. Translated by Gould, Rebecca. Durham, NC: Duke University Press: 293–302. doi:10.1215/9780822392583-047.
- Gould, Rebecca (April 2020). "Enchanting Literary Modernity: Idris Bazorkin's Postcolonial Soviet Pastoral". Modern Language Review. 115 (2): 405–428. doi:10.1353/mlr.2020.0071.
- Gould, Rebecca (2016). "Finding Bazorkin: A Journey from Anthropology to Literature". Anthropology and Humanism. 41 (1): 86–101. doi:10.1111/anhu.12109. hdl:1983/6f06753e-2f3e-4d0f-8dd9-de531d58ff59.
- Karabulatova, Irina; Ebzeeva, Julia; Pocheshkhov, Nurbiy (2017). "The repressed Caucasians' ethno-trauma expressed as "light" and "darkness" in selected writings of Idris Bazorkin" (PDF). Terra Sebus. Acta Musei Sabesiensis. 9: 447–457. eISSN 2344-5432. ISSN 2066-9143.
- Shakarian, Pietro A. (2025). Anastas Mikoyan: An Armenian Reformer in Khrushchev's Kremlin. Bloomington: Indiana University Press. ISBN 978-0253073556.
- Tsutsulaeva, Sapiyat; Mamsurova, Makka (2021-11-29). "Role of the Chechen intellectuals in the decisions on Chechen people rehabilitation". European Proceedings of Social and Behavioural Sciences. 117: 2606–2612. doi:10.15405/epsbs.2021.11.344. eISSN 2357-1330.

=== In Russian ===
- Abadiev, Bek (2013). "Театральное искусство" [Theater arts]. In Albogachieva, Makka; Martazanov, Arsamak; Solovyeva, Lyubov (eds.). Ингуши [The Ingush]. Narody I kultury (in Russian). Moscow: Nauka. pp. 391–398. ISBN 978-5-02-038042-4.
- Barakhoeva, A. (1996-04-23). Barakhoev, M. S.; et al. (eds.). "Частично возвращен архив Идриса Базоркина" [The archive of Idris Bazorkin has been partially returned]. Serdalo (in Russian). No. 17. Nalchik: GP KBR "Respublikanskiy poligrafkombinat im. Revolyutsii 1905 g.". p. 1.
- Dakhkilgov, Ibragim; Martazanova, Khanifa (2013). "Национальная литература" [National literature]. In Albogachieva, Makka; Martazanov, Arsamak; Solovyeva, Lyubov (eds.). Ингуши [The Ingush]. Narody I kultury (in Russian). Moscow: Nauka. pp. 380–391. ISBN 978-5-02-038042-4.
- Dolgieva, Maryam; Kartoev, Magomet; Kodzoev, Nurdin; Matiev, Timur (2013). Kodzoev, Nurdin; et al. (eds.). История Ингушетии [History of Ingushetia] (4th ed.). Rostov-on-Don: Yuzhnyy izdatelsky dom. pp. 1–600. ISBN 978-5-98864-056-1.
- Dzarakhova, Zeinep (2018). Barakhoeva, Nina; et al. (eds.). "Грузинская театральная школа в истории развития ингушского профессионального театра (1934—1984)" [The Georgian Theatre School in the history of the development of the Ingush Professional Theatre (1934–1984)]. Herald of the Ingush Research Institute of Humanities named after Ch. E. Akhriev (in Russian) (2): 10–13.
- Evloeva, Aza (2012). Ингушская драматургия [Ingush dramaturgy] (in Russian). Nalchik.
- Gazdiev, Ahmet (2023-05-31). "В Ингушетии отмечают День памяти выдающегося писателя и гражданина Идриса Базоркина" [Ingushetia celebrates the Day of Remembrance of the outstanding writer and citizen Idris Bazorkin]. Serdalo (in Russian).
- Gorbachev, Mikhail (1991-08-15). О награждении писателей Чечено-Ингушской республики орденом Дружбы народов [On awarding writers of the Chechen-Ingush Republic with the Order of Friendship of Peoples]. Bulettin of the Congress of People's Deputies of the USSR and The Supreme Council of the USSR (34, Art. 976) (in Russian). Kremlin, Moscow: Congress of People's Deputies of the Soviet Union.
- Gorchkhanova, Tanzila (2016). Жанр рассказа в ингушской литературе. Истоки. Становление [Genre of short story in Ingush literature. Origins. Becoming] (PDF) (in Russian). Moscow: Gorky Institute of World Literature. pp. 1–211.
- Kharchevnikov, Vladimir (1962). "Идрис Базоркин" [Idris Bazorkin]. Призыв: Избранное [Call: Favorite] (in Russian). Grozny: Checheno-Ingush Book Publishing House. pp. 3–15.
- Kharsieva, Liliia (2010). Patiev, Iakub (ed.). Специфика ингушской культуры: эстетические и духовно-нравственные основы романа И. Базоркина "Из тьмы веков" [Specifics of Ingush culture: aesthetic and spiritual-moral foundations of I. Bazorkin's novel "From the Darkness of Ages"] (in Russian). Rostov-on-Don: Yuzhnyy izdatelsky dom. pp. 1–164. ISBN 978-5-98993-028-9.
- Kharsieva, Liliia (2018-04-03). "Памятник юбиляру: Роману Идриса Базоркина «Из тьмы веков» открыт памятник в городе Назрани" [Monument to the hero of the day: A monument to Idris Bazorkin’s novel “From the Darkness of Ages” was unveiled in the city of Nazran]. Ingushetia (in Russian).
- Kodzoev, S. N. (2017-09-13). "К 28-летию II-го съезда ингушского народа" [To the 28th anniversary of the 2nd Congress of the Ingush people]. Serdalo (in Russian).
- Malsagov, Abu (1971). В боевом строю : Литературно-критические очерки [In combat formation: Literary critical essays] (in Russian). Grozny: Checheno-Ingush Book Publishing House. pp. 1–161.
- Martazanov, Arsamak (2017). "Повесть как жанр ингушской литературы" [The novel as a genre of the Ingush literature]. Baltysky gumanitarny zhurnal (in Russian). 6 (4): 121–123.
- Martazanov, Arsamak; Martazanova, Khanifa; Sarbasheva, Alena (May–August 2021). "Folklore and literary continuum in the North Caucasian novel of the late 20th century in the aspect of ethnopedagogy". Eduweb. 15 (2): 261–277. doi:10.46502/issn.1856-7576/2021.15.02.20. ISSN 1856-7576.
- Martazanova, Khanifa (2015a). "Творчество И. М. Базоркина: Векторы развития" [Creativity of I. M. Bazorkin: Vectors of development]. Mir nauki, kul'tury, obrazovaniya, zhurnal (in Russian). 6 (55): 315–317. eISSN 1991-5500. ISSN 1991-5497.
- Martazanova, Khanifa (2015b). "Художественный психологизм И. Базоркина" [Artistic psychologism by I. Bazorkin]. Mir nauki, kul'tury, ibrazovaniya, zhurnal (in Russian). 6 (55): 317–318. eISSN 1991-5500. ISSN 1991-5497.
- Nekrich, Аlexander (1978). Наказанные народы [The Punished peoples] (in Russian). New York: Khronika Press. pp. 1–170.
- Patiev, Iakub (2001). "Всегда с народом" [Always with the people]. In Murgustov, Magomed (ed.). Собрание сочинений в шести томах: Из тьмы веков [Collected works in six volumes: From the Darkness of Ages]. Библиотека ингушской литературы (in Russian). Vol. 1. Magas: Serdalo. pp. 3–24. ISBN 5-94452-011-6.
- Patiev, Iakub (2007). Хроника истории ингушского народа с древнейших времен до наших дней [Chronicle of the history of the Ingush people from ancient times to the present day] (in Russian). Makhachkala: Lotos. ISBN 978-5-91471-045-0.
- Patiev, Iakub (2015). Писатели Ингушетии [The writers of Ingushetia] (in Russian). Vol. 1. Rostov-on-Don: Yuzhnyy izdatelsky dom. pp. 1–203. ISBN 978-5-98864-071-4.
- Patiev, Iakub (2016-08-06). Patiev, Iakub; et al. (eds.). "Главная книга ингушской литературы" [The main book of Ingush literature]. Serdalo (in Russian). No. 117. Nazran: Serdalo. p. 2.
- Prokhorov, Alexander; et al., eds. (1970). "Базоркин Идрис Муртузович" [Bazorkin Idris Murtzuvovich]. Great Soviet Encyclopedia (in Russian). Vol. 2: Ангола-Барзас. Moscow: Great Soviet Encyclopedia. p. 528.
- Shnirelman, Victor (2006). Kalinin, Ilya (ed.). Быть Аланами: Интеллектуалы и политика на Северном Кавказе в XX веке [To be Alans: Intellectuals and Politics in the North Caucasus in the 20th Century] (in Russian). Moscow: NLR. pp. 1–691. ISBN 5-86793-406-3. ISSN 1813-6583.
- Turkaev, Hasan; Malsagov, Abu (1969). Писатели Советской Чечено-Ингушетии [Writers of Soviet Checheno-Ingushetia] (in Russian). Grozny: Checheno-Ingush book publishing house. pp. 1–150.
- Uzhakhova, Roza (2016). "Ранний период творчества Идриса Муртузовича Базоркина" [The early period of creativity of Idris Murtuzovich Bazorkin]. Lingua – universum (in Russian) (6): 20–26. ISSN 1819-3110.
- "В Болгарии во "Дворе кириллицы" установили бюст ингушского писателя Идриса Базоркина" [In Bulgaria, a bust of the Ingush writer Idris Bazorkin was installed in the "Cyrillic Courtyard"]. TASS (in Russian). 2018-07-28.
- Yandieva, Maryam (1990). Elsanov, Islam (ed.). Ингушский исторический роман [Ingush historical novel] (in Russian). Grozny: Kniga. pp. 1–106. ISBN 9785766600701.
- Yandieva, Maryam (2005). "Базо́ркин Идрис Муртузович" [Bazórkin Idris Murtuzovich]. In Kravets, S. L.; et al. (eds.). Great Russian Encyclopedia (in Russian). Vol. 3: "Banketnaya kampaniya" 1904 – Bolshoy Ipriz. Moscow: Great Russian Encyclopedia. ISBN 5-85270-331-1.

=== In Ingush ===
- Dzeytnäqhan, Zh. (2019-06-14). "Кхоллама никъ" [Career]. igmkri.ru (in Ingush).
