= Kist people =

Subgroup of Chechens living in Georgia

Kists ქისტები ПӀаьнгазхой
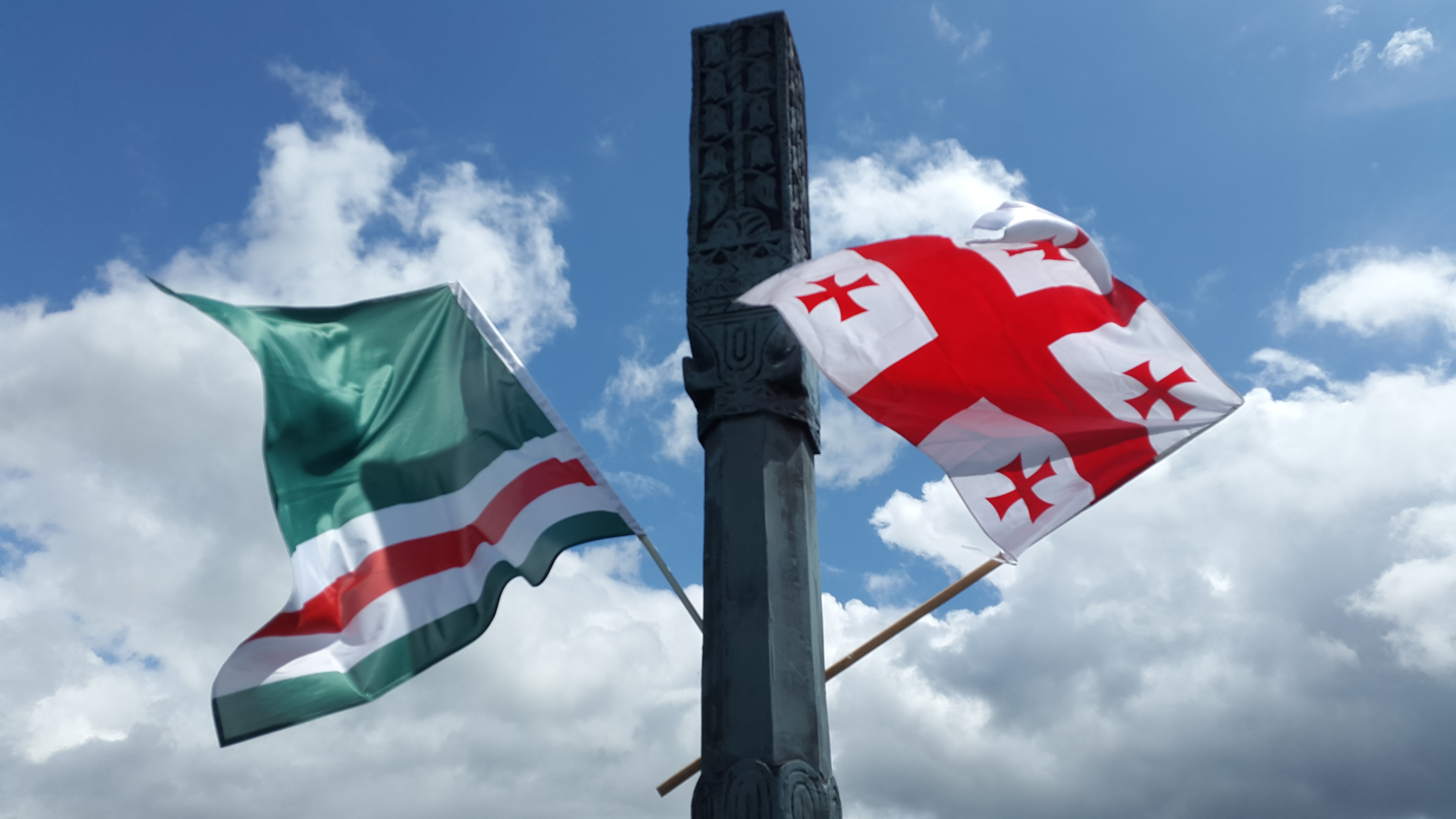

Total population
- c. 7,000

Regions with significant populations
- Pankisi Gorge, Kakheti and Tusheti (Georgia)
- Georgia: 5,697 (2014)
- Russia: 707 (2010)

Languages
- Chechen (Kist dialect), Georgian

Religion
- Predominantly Sunni Islam, minority Christianity

Related ethnic groups
- Other Nakh peoples, especially other Chechens

The Kists (Georgian: ქისტები, kist'ebi; Chechen: P'ängazxuoj) are a Chechen sub-ethnic group in Georgia. They primarily live in the Pankisi Gorge, in the eastern Georgian region of Kakheti, where there are approximately 5,700 Kist people. The modern Kists are not to be confused with the historical term Kists, an ethnonym of Georgian origin, which was used to refer to the Nakh peoples in the Middle Ages.

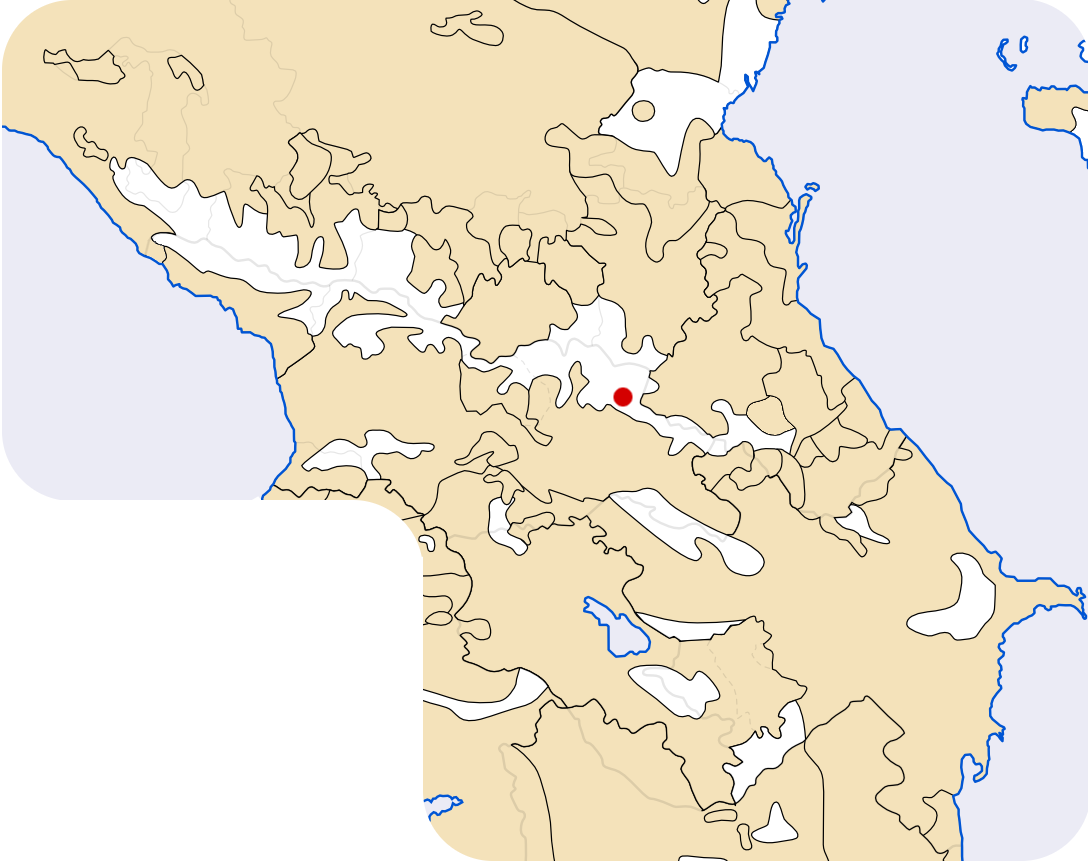
Map of Kists in Georgia

== Name ==
Ethnonyms given by neighboring people to Kists:
Sources of 19–20th centuries
Ethnonyms:	Term meaning	Year	Author	Work
phengisxuoj	Ingush name for Kistins	1930	Anatoly Genko	"Iz kylturnogo proshlogo ingushey"
пӀенгисхой	Vainakh name for Pankisians	1975	Nureddin Akhriev	"Iskonnye imena chechentsev i ingushey"
пӀаьнгазхой	Chechen name for Kistin dialect speakers	1978	Ibragim Aliroev	"Russko-chechenskiy slovar"

== Geographic distribution ==
Currently there are six Kist villages in Pankisi: Duisi, Dzibakhevi, Jokolo, Shua Khalatsani, Omalo (different from the village of Omalo in Tusheti), and Birkiani. The Kist community remains quite small and is scattered across northeast Georgia, but in the decade to 2007 the number of residents in the Pankisi area at least doubled due to an influx of refugees from neighboring Chechnya.

In 1989, it was calculated that Pankisi was about 43% Kist, 29% Georgian and 28% Ossetian, but many of the Ossetians later fled as a result of the more hostile situation due to the Russian-supported conflict of Ossetians against ethnic Georgians in the Samachablo region of Georgia.

== History ==
The Kist people's origins can be traced back to their ancestral land in lower Chechnya. In the 1830s and 1870s they migrated to the eastern Georgian Pankisi Gorge and some adjoining lands of the provinces of Tusheti and Kakheti. Named "Kists" (ქისტები) in Georgian, they are closely related culturally, linguistically and ethnically to other Nakh-speaking peoples such as Ingushes and Chechens, but their customs and traditions also share many similarities with the eastern Georgian mountaineers.

Around the same region of Georgia, there is also a related but still different community of Nakh origin called Bats. The early history of the Kist people is not well known and there are few sources mentioning their traditions, culture and history. The only historical sources available about the ethnic Kists in the area of Pankisi are found in the Georgian press, dated in the 1880s by E. Gugushvili, Zakaria Gulisashvili, Ivane Bukurauli, and Mate Albutashvili (ethnic Kist).

During the Second World War, the Kists were the only Chechens in the Soviet Union who were not ethnically cleansed by Stalin in 1944.

During the Second Chechen War, the Kists gave shelter to about 7,000 refugees from Chechnya.

== Demographics ==
In the 1886 census there were 2,314 Kistins in the Tiflis province of the Russian Empire. In the 1897 census the Kistins were classified together with Chechens as a single ethnicity (Chechen) that were "Chechen or Kist speaking" and there were 2,502 of them living in the Tiflis province. As per the Russian Empire Census of 1897, there were 413 Kistin dialect speakers present in the Russian Empire, out of which 259 were men and 154 were women. In the 1926 Soviet Census, there were 1,891 Kists in the Georgian SSR and they were classified together with the Ingush proper as single ethnicity (Ingush) whose native language was classified as Chechen. In the 1939 census the Kistins were classified as Chechens and there were 2,433 of them in the Georgian SSR.

== Religion ==
The majority of Kists adhere to religion made up of syncretized Sunni Muslim beliefs with animistic folk religion. Small pockets of Christian Kists still remain in Pankisi, Tusheti and Kakheti. To this day, the Kists worship the Khevsur sacred places (jvari) and make sacrifices to the Anatori jvari near the Khevsureti village of Shatili, which is located at the Georgian-Chechen border. The Anatori jvari was also considered sacred by Chechens in Maisti and Melkhisti. Highlanders from both the northern Caucasus and Georgia participated together in religious celebrations until the borders were closed. Although today the Kists pray in the mosque in the village of Duisi, they also pray at the sites of old, now-ruined Christian sanctuaries. The Christians among them and some folk followers pray in Saint George church in the village of Joqolo and attend the religious celebration Alaverdoba in the Alaverdi Monastery of Kakheti. Additionally, Kists celebrate Tetri Giorgoba, a local variation of St George's Day.

When the Kists first arrived in the valley in the early 19th century from Chechnya and Ingushetia, their religious practices included both Islam and their original Nakh religion, with some overlap with the indigenous beliefs of their highland Georgian neighbors. There were also Christian influences. In the latter half of the 19th century, the Russian government pressured the Kists to convert to Orthodox Christianity, and there were various episodes of mass baptisms and church construction. In 1902, Kists who had remained Muslim constructed a mosque in Duisi, but the Russian government refused to recognize it. The Duisi mosque was forcefully closed, along with other religious structures after the Bolshevik revolution, and not reopened until 1960. Sanikidze notes that many Kists, regardless of their designation, have a mix of Muslim, Christian and indigenous religious practices.

The position of Islam strengthened among the Kists in the Soviet period, in part because "wandering" mullahs continued to proselytize and managed to persuade many to convert to Islam, a process that continued into the 1970s. In sum, over the years considerable numbers of Kists became Christian, but most of those who did later reconverted to Islam. Even so, until around 1970, a considerable part of the villagers of Jokolo, Omalo, and Birkiani were Christian, and a Christian chapel was built in Omalo in the 1960s. In the 1970s, however, many Christians in Jokolo and Omalo returned to the Islamic faith. Only Birkiani has a majority Christian population today. Birkiani has two mosques as of 2022. There is also a small community of Kists in Kakheti (a region of Georgia bordering on the Gorge), mainly in the city of Telavi, who consider themselves Orthodox Christians.

== Traditions ==
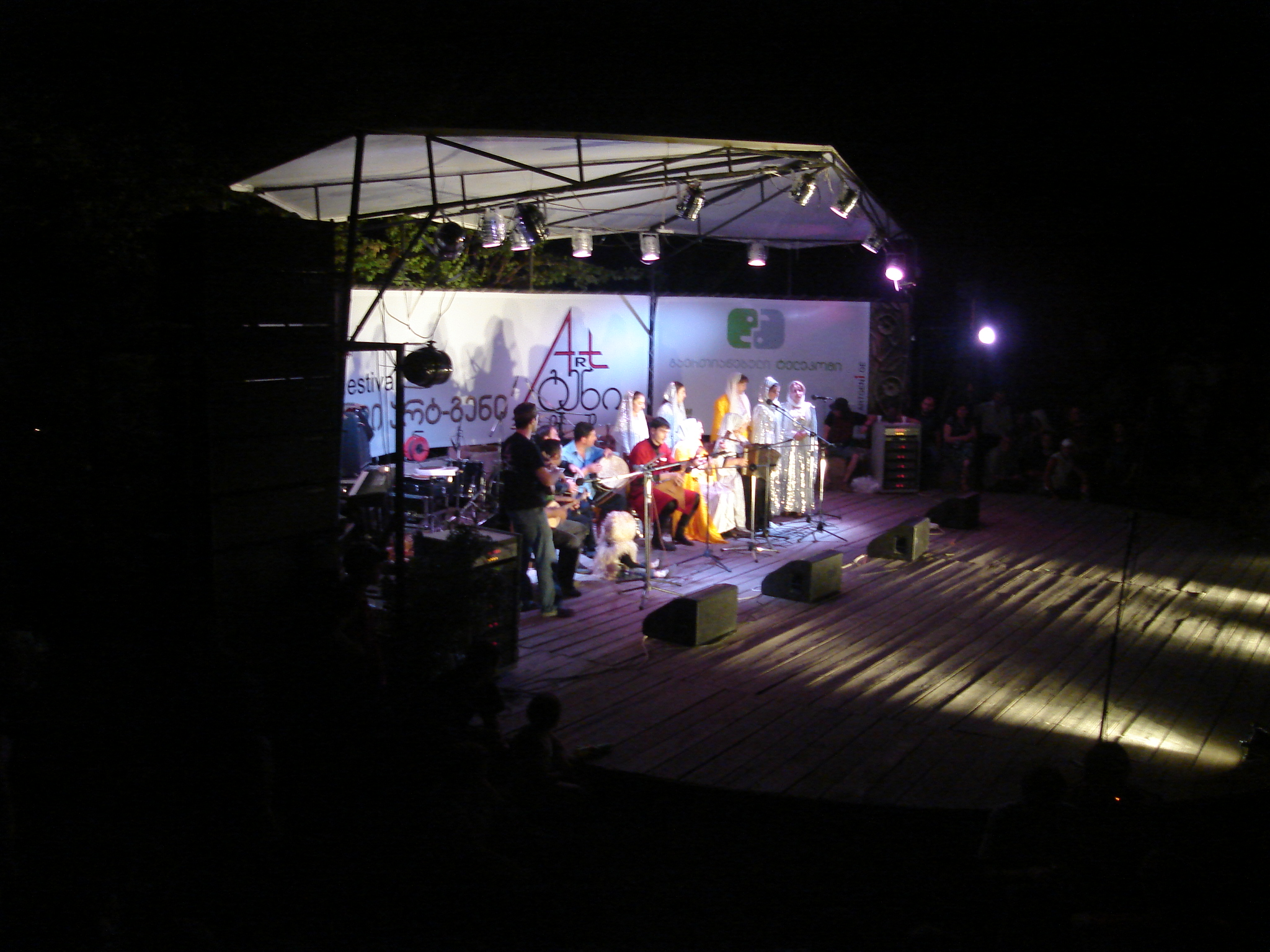
The Kist folk ensemble Pankisi at the Art-Gene festival in Tbilisi

The Kists retain family traditions and customs. They identify themselves as Chechen, and for official purposes declare themselves of Georgian nationality. They are typically bilingual in Chechen and Georgian. The customs and habits of the Kist people have been described in a number of ethnographic studies.

== Notable Kistis ==
Zelimkhan Khangoshvili (1979-2019) - Georgian military officer, platoon commander for the Chechen Republic of Ichkeria.

== See also ==
- Vainakh

== Bibliography ==
=== English sources ===
- National statistics office of Georgia (Geostat) (2016-04-28). "2014 General Population Census" (PDF). pp. 1–17. Archived from the original (PDF) on 2017-10-10.
- Tsutsiev, A. A. (2014). Atlas of the Ethno-Political History of the Caucasus (PDF). Translated by Nora Seligman Favorov. New Haven: Yale University Press. pp. 1–221. ISBN 9780300153088. Archived (PDF) from the original on 17 June 2023.

=== Russian sources ===
- Алироев, И. Ю. (1978). "Дешхьалхе" [Foreword]. In Алироев, И. Ю.; Карасаев, А. Т.; Тимаев, А. Д.; Эсхаджиев, Я. У.; Ред. языков народов СССР (eds.). Русско-чеченский словарь: 40 тыс. слов [Russian-Chechen dictionary: 40 thousand words] (in Chechen). Москва: Русский язык. pp. 7–9.
- Ахриев, Н. Г. (1975). "Исконные имена чеченцев и ингушей" [Original names of Chechens and Ingush]. Сборник статей и материалов по вопросам нахского языкознания. Известия ЧИНИИИЯЛ [Collection of articles and materials on questions of Nakh linguistics. Izvestia CHIIIIYAL] (in Russian). Vol. 10. Грозный: Чеч.-Инг. кн. изд-во. pp. 199–212.
- Волкова, Н. Г.; Лавров, Л. И. (1968). "Современные этнические процессы" [Modern ethnic processes]. In Гарданов, В. К. (ed.). Культура и быт народов Северного Кавказа (1917—1967 гг.) [Culture and life of the peoples of the North Caucasus (1917-1967)] (in Russian). Москва: Наука. pp. 329–346.
- Генко, А. Н. (1930). "Из культурного прошлого ингушей" [From the cultural past of the Ingush] (PDF). Записки коллегии востоковедов при Азиатском музее [Notes of the College of Orientalists at the Asian Museum] (PDF) (in Russian). Vol. 5. Ленинград: Изд-во Академии наук СССР. pp. 681–761.
- "Первая всеобщая перепись населения Российской Империи 1897 г. Распределение населения по родному языку, губерниям и областям" [The first general census of the population of the Russian Empire in 1897 Distribution of the population by native language, provinces and regions]. Демоскоп Weekly (in Russian). Archived from the original on 2020-10-14.
- Закавк. центр. стат. упр. (1928a). Население Закавказья: народность-родной язык-возраст-грамотность [The population of Transcaucasia: nationality-mother tongue-age-literacy]. Всесоюзная перепись населения 1926 г.: краткие итоги (in Russian). Тифлис: Б. и. pp. I–XXI, 1–39.
- Центр. стат. упр. СССР (1928b). Выпуск IV. Народность и родной язык населения СССР [Issue IV. Nationality and native language of the population of the USSR]. Всесоюзная перепись населения 17 декабря 1926 г.: краткие сводки в 10 вып. (1927—1929) (in Russian). Москва: Изд. ЦСУ Союза ССР. pp. I–XXIX, 1–138.
