= Restoration of Checheno-Ingush autonomy =

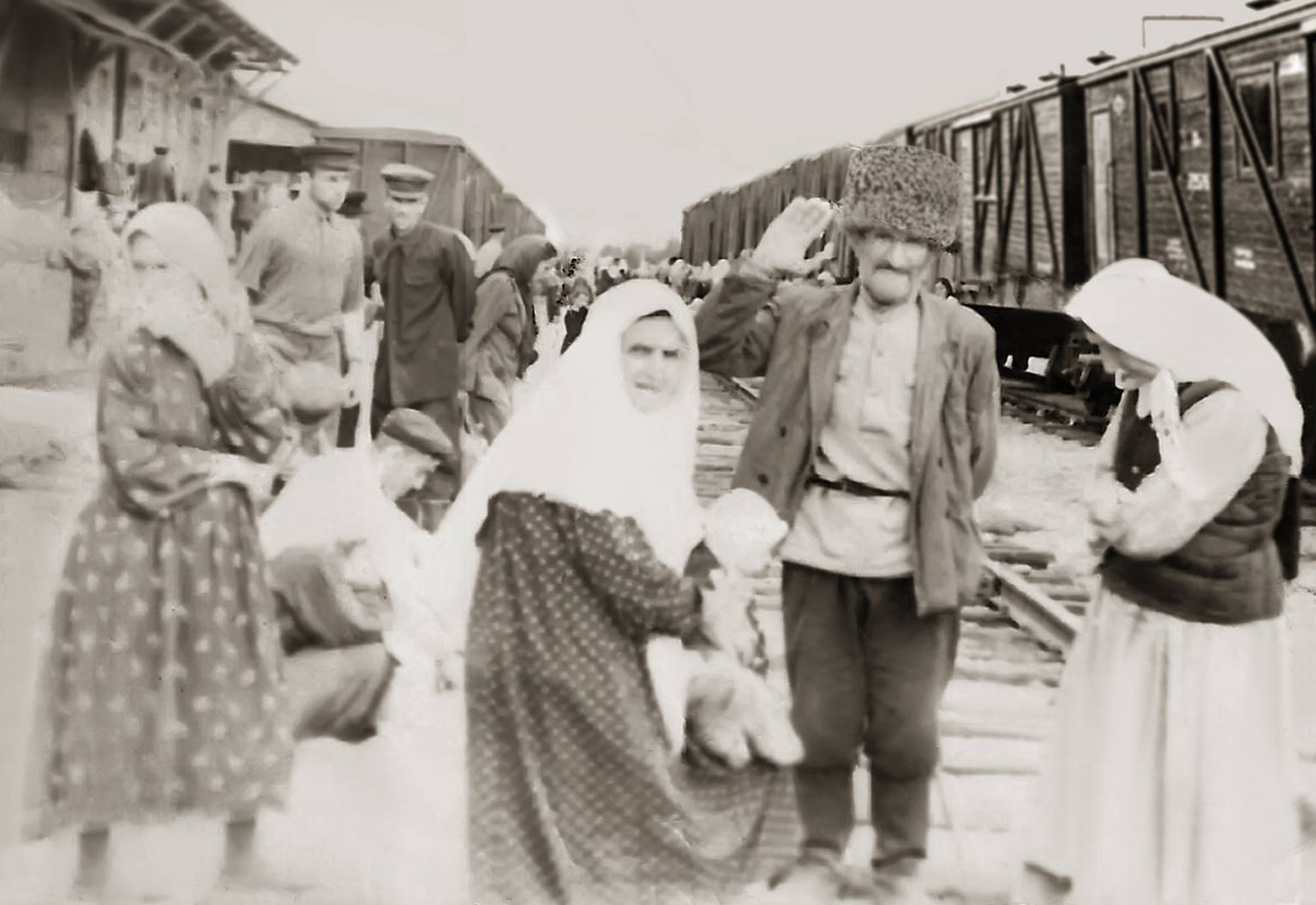
Chechen residents of the village of Yurt-Aukh, awaiting return to their homes at a railway station in Bishkek, 1957

The restoration of the Checheno-Ingush autonomy was facilitated by decrees of the Presidiums of the Supreme Soviets of the USSR and the RSFSR on January 9, 1957, re-establishing the Checheno-Ingush ASSR amid the larger Khrushchev Thaw.

== History ==
On February 23, 1944, the Chechens and Ingush were deported. In 1948, by a special resolution of the Council of Ministers of the USSR, it was confirmed that the Chechens and Ingush were deported "forever." After the death of Stalin and the execution of Beria, the deported peoples had hope for rehabilitation and return to their homeland. Well-known representatives of the repressed peoples (writers, scientists, executives, retired officers) and ordinary citizens began to persistently apply to the authorities with their requests, the main of which was to immediately return the deported peoples and remove charges of collaborationism from them.

Nikita Khrushchev officially condemned the deportation of nationalities in his "Secret Speech" at the 20th Party Congress in February 1956. On June 9 of that year, Khrushchev's close ally, Anastas Mikoyan, met with a delegation of Checheno-Ingush representatives in the Kremlin, led by Ingush writer Idris Bazorkin and Chechen linguist Iunus Desheriev. At the meeting, Mikoyan promised the delegation that he would support them in their effort to restore the Checheno-Ingush ASSR. Several other public figures also played an important role in the restoration, among them Abdurakhman Avtorkhanov, Muslim Gairbekov, and Magomed Shataev.

On February 11, 1957, the Supreme Soviet of the USSR approved the decree of its Presidium of January 9 and returned the mention of autonomy to Article 22 of the USSR Constitution. The autonomous republic was restored with only slightly different boundaries than when abolished. Naursky and Shelkovsky districts with a predominantly Russian population transferred in 1944 from the Stavropol Krai to the Grozny Oblast remained in its composition, but the Prigorodny District, which remained in the North Ossetian ASSR, was not returned to it. The area of the republic after the restoration was 19,300 km². At the same time, the Checheno-Ingush population was forbidden to live in the southern mountainous regions of the republic adjacent to the Georgian SSR.

Due to the inconsistent implementation of the decree, as well as the resistance of part of the party-Soviet nomenklatura in the center and in the field, the restoration process dragged on, was fraught with many difficulties and created new problems. The restoration of the republic launched the process of the outflow of the Russian and Russian-speaking population from the region and led to a sharp aggravation of interethnic relations.

== See also ==
- History of Chechnya
- History of Ingushetia
- Deportation of the Chechens and Ingush
