= Dzherakh =

Ingush society

Dzherakh Джейрхой
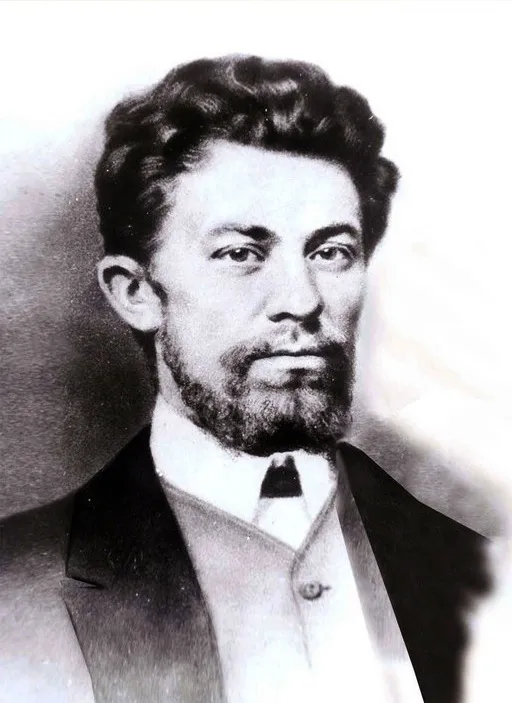
- Chakh Akhriev, representative of the society.

Regions with significant populations
- Russia: ?
- Ingushetia: ?

Languages
- Ingush

Religion
- Sunni Islam

The Dzherakh or Jeyrakh (Ingush: ЖӀайрахой, romanized: Ƶjayraxoy, IPA: [ˈʒˤəɪɾəxʷɔɪ]), historically also known as the Erokhan, were a historical Ingush ethno-territorial society, existing today as a tribal organisation or clan (teip), (Note: Dzherakh were mentioned as an Ingush society by "Overview of the political state of the Caucasus in 1840", "Caucasian Territory // Military Statistical Review of the Russian Empire, 1851", Bulletin of the Caucasian Department of the Imperial Russian Geographical Society, Volkonsky, Maksimov, Vertepov, Pantyukhov, Kovalevsky, Milyutin, Martirosian, Soviet Ethnography, Geiger, Halasi-Kun, Kuipers, Menges, Krupnov, Volkova, G. Anchabadze, V. A. Kuznetsov and Pavlova.) originally formed in the Dzheyrakhin gorge, as well as in the lower reaches of the Armkhi River and the upper reaches of the Terek River.

The Dzherakhs first appeared in Russian sources in the 16th century under the name Erokhan people (Russian: Ероханские люди, romanized: Erokhanskie lyudi).

== History ==
The Dzherakhs were first mentioned in the 16th century in Russian documents as the Erokhan people. They were also noted by the Georgian prince, historian, and geographer Prince Vakhushti of Kartli in 1745. According to the ethnographer Chakh Akhriev, the foundation of the society traces back to Prince Dzherakhmat, from whom the Dzherakh clans descend.

Their first documented contact with the Russian Empire occurred in 1833 during a punitive expedition in Mountainous Ingushetia, led by General Abkhazov.

The Dzherakhs were known for conducting raids during the Caucasian War, alongside the Kists (Fyappiy) and Tagaurs.

== Composition ==
Dzherakh society/teip consisted of the following fortified villages (auls) and surnames (nyaqhash/vyarash): (Note: The information in the table is based on several archive documents such as: "List of populated locations of the Voeynno-Ossetinskiy Okrug" (1859), "List of residents of the Gorsky Uchastok of the Ingushskiy Okrug, with testimony against everyone who, how many have their own arable hay days of land" (1864) and "List of mountain villages of the Kuban and Terek Oblasts" (1869). The orthography of the teips and nyaqhash/vyarash was mainly based on the work "Onomasticon of Ingushetia", while the information regarding what auls they inhabit/inhabited is mainly based on the information of Zaurbek Malsagov and Shukri Dakhilgov.)

Auls	Teips and nyaqhash/vyarash
Dzheyrakh (Жӏайрах)	Lyanovs (Льяннаькъан), Tsurovs (Чурнаькъан), Khamatkhanovs (Хаматханнаькъан)
Ezmi (Эзми)	Kozyrevs (Къоазанаькъан)
Furtoug (Фуртовг)	Akhrievs (Оахаргнаькъан)
Pkhmat (Пхьмат)	Borovs (Бурнаькъан)
Non-existent auls whose territory comprise today's Dzheyrakh. Biykau layer became part of (Anzor) Borova aul, which later, was evicted by Russian Administration from the left bank of Terek River in 1865.
Biykau (Бийков)	
Borova	
Egon-Kale (Эгӏара-кхал)	
Kalmykov (Калмыков)	
Makhan-Kale (Maгӏapa-кхал)	

== Bibliography ==
=== English sources ===
- Anchabadze, George (2001). Vainakhs (The Chechen and Ingush). Tbilisi: Caucasian House. pp. 1–76.
- Geiger, Bernard; Halasi-Kun, Tibor; Kuipers, Aert; Menges, Karl H. (Columbia University) (1959). Peoples and Languages of the Caucasus. A Synopsis. Janua Linguarum. Hague: S-Gravenhage: Mouton & Co. pp. 1–79.

=== Russian sources ===
- Багратиони, Вахушти (1904). География Грузии [Geography of Georgia] (in Russian). Translated by Джананашвили, М. Г. Тифлис: Типография К.П. Козловского. Головинск. просп., № 12. pp. 1–290.
- Волкова, Н. Г. (1973). Этнонимы и племенные названия Северного Кавказа [Ethnonyms and tribal names of the North Caucasus] (in Russian). Москва: Наука. pp. 1–210.
- Волконский, Н. А. (1886). "Война на Восточном Кавказе с 1824 по 1834 годы в связи с мюридизмом" [War in the Eastern Caucasus from 1824 to 1834 in connection with Muridism]. Кавказский сборник [Caucasian collection] (in Russian). Vol. 10. Тифлис. pp. 1–225.
- Воронов, Н. И.; Кавказскій отдѣлъ Императорскаго русскаго географическаго общества (1869). "Списокъ горскихъ ауловъ Кубанской и Терской областей" [List of mountain villages of the Kuban and Terek Oblasts]. Сборникъ статистическихъ свѣдѣній о Кавказѣ [Collection of statistical information about the Caucasus] (in Russian). Vol. 1. Тифлисъ: Типографія Главнаго Управленія Намѣстника Кавказскаго; Типографія Меликова и К. pp. 41–52 (418–429 as PDF).
- Дахкильгов, Ш. Э-Х. (1989). "По следам легенды" [In the footsteps of a legend]. Слово о родном крае: записки краеведа [A word about the native land: notes of a local historian] (in Russian). Грозный: Чечено-Ингушское книжное изд-во. ISBN 9785766600237.
- Дахкильгов, Ш. Э-Х. (1991). Зязиков, А. А. (ed.). Происхождение ингушских фамилий [Origin of Ingush surnames] (in Russian). Грозный: Книга. pp. 1–108.
- Долгиева, М. Б.; Картоев, М. М.; Кодзоев, Н. Д.; Матиев, Т. Х. (2013). Кодзоев, Н. Д. (ed.). История Ингушетии [History of Ingushetia] (4nd ed.). Ростов-на-Дону: Южный издательский дом. pp. 1–600. ISBN 978-5-98864-056-1.
- Картоев, М. М. (2020). Ингушетия в политике Российской империи на Кавказе. XIX век. Сборник документов и материалов [Ingushetia in the policy of the Russian Empire in the Caucasus. 19th century. Collection of documents and materials]. История Ингушетии: открытый архив (in Russian) (2 ed.). Ростов-на-Дону: Южный издательский дом. pp. 1–760. ISBN 978-5-98864-060-8.
- Кодзоев, Н. Д.; Киева, З. Х. (2021). Накостхоев, Х. А.; Хайрова, Р. Р. (eds.). Ономастикон Ингушетии [Onomasticon of Ingushetia] (in Russian). Москва: ТПК «Центробланк». pp. 1–121. ISBN 978-5-91303-022-1.
- "Кавказский край" [Caucasian territory]. Военно-статистическое обозрение Российской империи: издаваемое по высочайшему повелению при 1-м отделении Департамента Генерального штаба [Military Statistical Review of the Russian Empire: published by the highest command at the 1st branch of the Department of the General Staff] (in Russian). Vol. 16. Part 1. СПб.: Типография Департамента Генерального штаба. 1851. pp. 1–274.
- Ковалевский, П. И. (1914). Народы Кавказа [Peoples of the Caucasus] (in Russian). Санкт-Петербург: Типография М. И. Акинфиев. pp. 1–346.
- Крупнов, Е. И. (1971). Средневековая Ингушетия [Medieval Ingushetia] (in Russian). Москва: Наука. pp. 1–211.
- Кузнецов, В. А. (2004). Введение в кавказоведение (историко-этнологические очерки народов Северного Кавказа) [Introduction to Caucasian Studies (Historical and Ethnological Essays on the Peoples of the North Caucasus)] (in Russian). Владикавказ: ИПП им. В. А. Гассиева. pp. 1–184.
- Кушева, Е. Н. (1963). Народы Северного Кавказа и их связи с Россией (вторая половина XVI — 30-е годы XVII века) [The peoples of the North Caucasus and their relations with Russia (the second half of the 16th - 30s of the 17th century)] (PDF) (in Russian). Москва: Издательство Академии наук СССР. pp. 1–370.
- Максимов, Е.; Вертепов, Г. (1892). Туземцы Северного Кавказа. Историко-статистические очерки. Выпуск первый. Осетины, ингуши, кабардинцы [Natives of the North Caucasus. Historical and statistical essays. Release the first. Ossetians, Ingush, Kabardians] (in Russian). Владикавказ: Типография Областного правления Терской Области. pp. 1–189.
- Мальсагов, З. К. (1963). Оздоева, Ф. (ed.). Грамматика ингушского языка [Grammar of the Ingush language] (in Ingush and Russian). Vol. 5 (2nd ed.). Грозный: Чечено-Ингушское Книжное Издательство. pp. 1–164.
- Мартиросиан, Г. К. (1928). Нагорная Ингушия [Upland Ingushiya] (in Russian). Владикавказ: Государственная типография Автономной Области Ингушии. pp. 1–153.
- Мациев, А. Г.; Оздоев, И. А.; Джамалханов, З. Д. (1962). Саламов, А. А.; Зязиков, Б. Х. (eds.). Чеченско-ингушско-русский словарь [Chechen-Ingush-Russian dictionary] (in Ingush, Chechen, and Russian). Грозный: Чечено-Ингушское Книжное Издательство. pp. 1–212.
- Милютин, Д. А. (1919). Христиани, Г. Г. (ed.). Воспоминания. Книга 1, 2, 3 [Memorials. Book 1, 2, 3] (in Russian). Vol. 1. Томск: Издание военной Академии. pp. 1–458. ISBN 5998998936.
- Павлова, О. С. (2012). Ингушский этнос на современном этапе: черты социально-психологического портрета [The Ingush ethnos at the present stage: features of the socio-psychological portrait] (in Russian). Москва: Форум. pp. 1–384. ISBN 9785911346652. OCLC 798995782.
- Пантюхов, И. И. (1901). Ингуши. Антропологический очерк [Ingush. An anthropological essay] (in Russian). Тифлис: Типография К. П. Козловского. Головинский пр.. д. № 12. pp. 1–35.
- Сулейманов, А. С. (1978). Шайхиев, А. Х. (ed.). Топонимия Чечено-Ингушетии. Горная Ингушетия (юго-запад) и Чечня (центр и юго-восток) [Toponymy of Checheno-Ingushetia. Mountainous Ingushetia (southwest) and Chechnya (center and southeast)] (in Russian). Vol. 2. Грозный: Чечено-Ингушское Книжное Издательство. pp. 1–233.
- Щербатов, А. П. (1891). Генерал-Фельдмаршал князь Паскевич (in Russian). СПб. ISBN 9785518040410.
