= Rashid-bek Akhriev =

Rashid-bek Chakhovich Akhriev
- Рашид-бек Чахович Ахриев
- Born: 1893 (Note: Sources differ as to whether he was born in 1893, 1895, or 1897); Furtoug, Russian Empire
- Died: 20 January 1942; Kirovsky district, Soviet Union
- Military career
- Allegiance: Russian Empire; Soviet Union
- Branch: Aviation
- Service years: 1914 – 1942
- Conflicts: World War I World War II †

Rashid-bek Chakhovich Akhriev (Note: Russian: Рашид-бек Чахович Ахриев; Ingush: Оахаргнаькъан ЧхьагӀий Рашид-Бек, romanized: Oakhargnäqan Chkhaghiy Rashid-Bek) (1890s – 20 January 1942) was an Ingush aviator of the Soviet Air Forces and the first North Caucasian pilot. He became the first person to land a plane in Tajikistan, doing so in the midst of the Basmachi revolt in 1924. During the Second World War he served as a flight commander in a special-purpose transport unit until he died in the line of duty in 1942 after being shot down by German anti-aircraft guns.

== Background ==
Akhriev was born in 1893 to an Ingush family in Furtoug within the Russian Empire. His father, Chakh Akhriev, was a famous historian and ethnographer. In 1914 Rashid-bek Akhriev entered the Tiflis Military School in Georgia and graduated from the Gatchina Aviation School. He was subsequently wounded twice during the first world war.

== Career in Soviet aviation ==
After joining the Red Army in 1923 he was sent to Central Asia to assist in the development of aviation in the region. The Soviet government had purchased eight Junkers U-13 from Germany for use by the branch of Dobrolyot based in Central Asia. The U-13s were disassembled, shipped by rail to Tashkent, and then reassembled. In August 1924 Akhriev piloted the maiden flight of the Tashkent-Bukhara route. Shortly thereafter he and flight engineer Pyotr Komarov flew the maiden flight of the Bukhara-Dushanbe route, which was also the first time an airplane landed in Tajikistan. The aircraft flying the route was armed with two rifles and hand grenades, due to the risk of the plane being shot down and attacked by Basmachi rebels in the area. The plane was not attacked and made a successful landing in Dushanbe on 3 September 1924. The anniversary of the historic flight is celebrated annually in by people in Tajikistan's aviation industry after the date was officially declared the Day of Aviation of the Republic of Tajikistan in 1994.

In 1927 Akhriev was transferred to the Kharkiv directorate in the Ukrainian Division of the Civil Air Fleet, where he flew the Kharkiv-Moscow, Kharkiv-Kiev, and Kharkiv-Rostov routes. During his career he worked with some of the USSR's most famed pilots, including Mikhail Gromov, Mavriky Slepnyov, and Mikhail Vodopyanov. He remained in the Ukrainian Division of the Civil Air Fleet until 1941.

== World War II ==
After the German invasion of the Soviet Union in 1941, Akhriev volunteered to serve on the warfront and was deployed as part of a special-purpose aviation unit under the command of Shalva Chankotadze. The squadron he was assigned to carried out deliveries of ammunition and food to besieged Leningrad from Moscow. He completed dozens of combat mission before he was killed in action on 20 January 1942. On that day he was leading a flight of three aircraft over enemy territory; Akhriev and another one of the planes were shot down by German anti-aircraft guns when they tried to attack a strategically important bridge. After the blockade of Leningrad ended in 1944 the remains of Akhriev and the other pilots were found and buried with full military honors in the village near Arbuzovo.
