= Caucasology =

Academic study of the culture, geography, history and people of the Caucasus region

Caucasology, or Caucasiology is the historical and geopolitical studies of the Caucasus region. The branch has more than 150 years history. In 1972, the Caucasiological Center (renamed to International Caucasiological Center in 2000) was founded under the auspices of the Israel President Zalman Shazar.

== See also ==
- Armenian studies
- Kartvelian studies
- Russian studies
- Turkish studies
- Cultural studies
- Area studies
