= Furtoug =

Furtoug Фуртоуг
- selo

Other transcription(s)
  - Ingush: Фуртовг
- Interactive map of Furtoug
- Location of Furtoug Furtoug (Republic of Ingushetia)
- Coordinates: 42°50′35″N 44°39′36″E
- Country: Russia
- Federal subject: Ingushetia
- Elevation: 1,210 m (3,970 ft)

Population (2010 Census)
  - Total: 0
  - Estimate (2024): 2 )

Administrative status
  - Subordinated to: Dzheyrakhsky District
- Time zone: UTC+3 (MSK)
- Postal code: 386430
- OKTMO ID: 26620410111

Furtoug (Russian: Фуртоуг, Ingush: Фуртовг, romanized: Furtovg) is a rural locality (aul) in Dzheyrakhsky District of the Republic of Ingushetia, Russia. Furtoug is one of the six rural localities comprising the Dzheyrakh rural settlement. It was the birthplace of two influential figures in Ingush history: one of the first Ingush scholars, Chakh Akhriev, and the famous revolutionary Gapur Akhriev.

== History ==
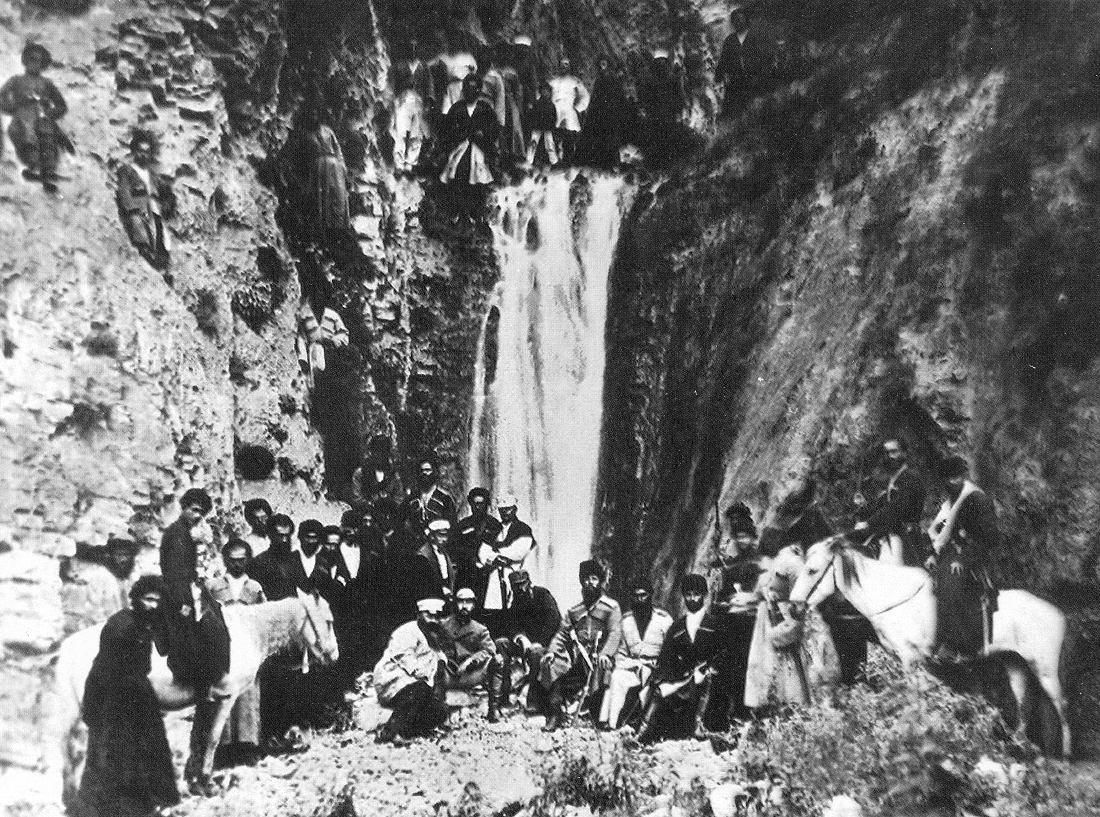
D. I. Mendeleev, together with the Ingush highlanders at the Furtoug waterfall.

Archaeological evidence suggests that the area has been inhabited since the 9th century, with various Bronze Age artefacts, such as bracelets, mirrors, earrings, rings, and ceramics, having been discovered in local necropolises.

In the 18th century, Furtoug was home to several notable builders of towers, cult structures, and burial monuments, including Dugo Akhriev, Dyatsi Lyanov, and Khazbi Tsurov. The mausoleum of Dugo Akhriev still stands today.

In 1880, the Russian scientist D. I. Mendeleev visited the area as part of a geological expedition.

On 15 May 1981, a memorial museum was opened in the former home of Gapur Akhriev in Furtoug. The museum showcases a variety of artefacts and cultural items, including antiquities, a traditional hearth, kitchen utensils, old photographs, and documents. The village is home to several Ingush clans (taips), including the Akhrievs, Lyanovs and the Borovs.

== Geography ==
Furtoug is situated in the Dzheyrakh Gorge, at the top of a spur of the Table Mountain, on the right bank of the Armkhi (Kistinka) River. The region is known for its landmarks, including the Furtougsky waterfall, which was named after D. I. Mendeleev.

The village is surrounded by mountainous terrain, with the Dikduk and Myatlom mountains to the north and northeast, and the Beryr-gala and Duhargisht mountains to the east. To the southeast lies the Dzheyrakh mountain range, while Ezmi and Pkhamat mountains are to the south.

To the west, the entrance arch to the Dzheyrakh region is located, beyond which lies the Georgian Military Road and the village of Chmi.

== Infrastructure ==
The village has one street - Bodi-Khadzhi Street.

== Gallery ==
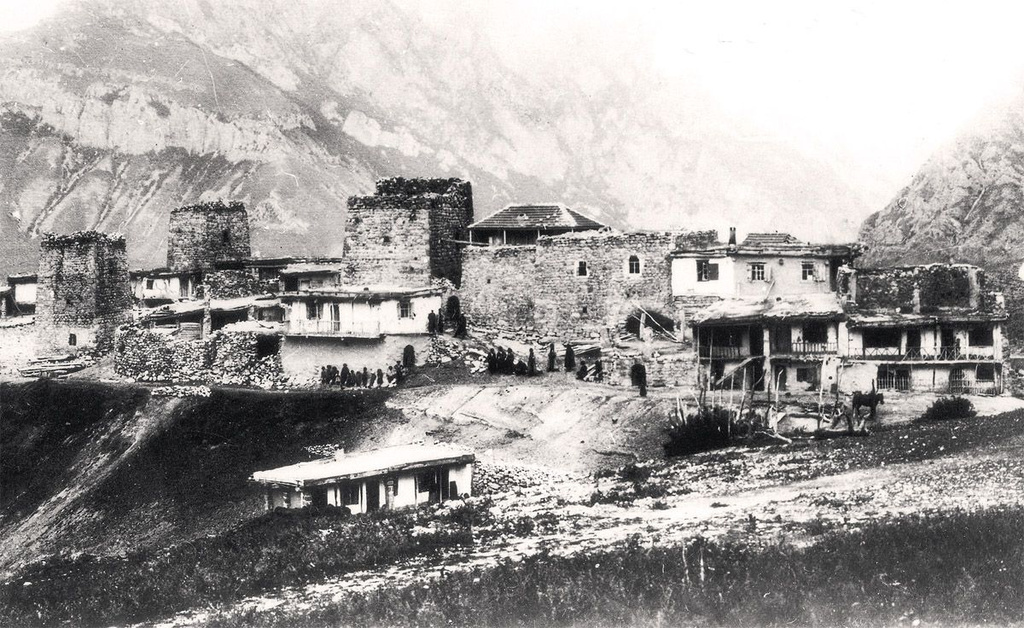
Furtoug in early XX century.

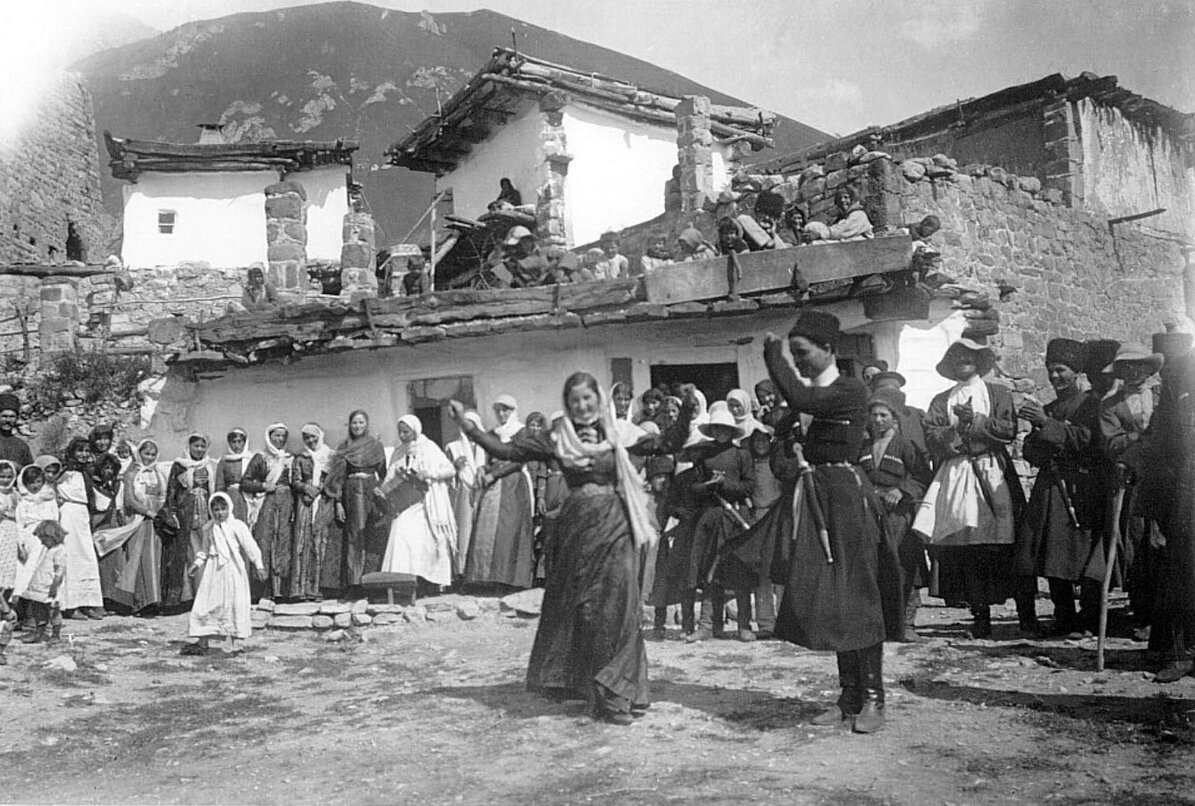
Wedding in Furtoug. Early 1900's.

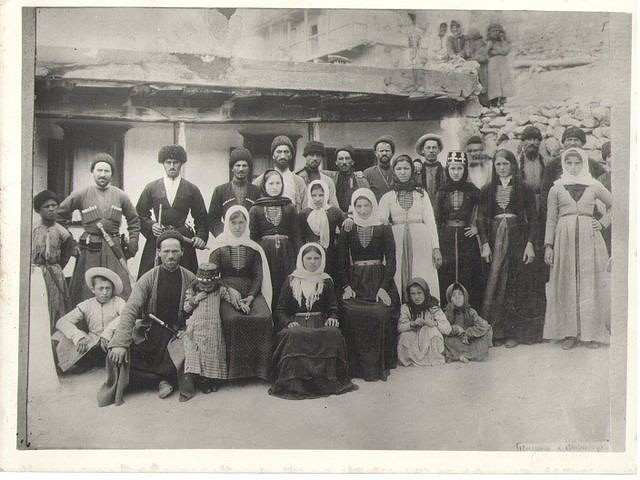
Akhrievs from Fortoug. 1920s.

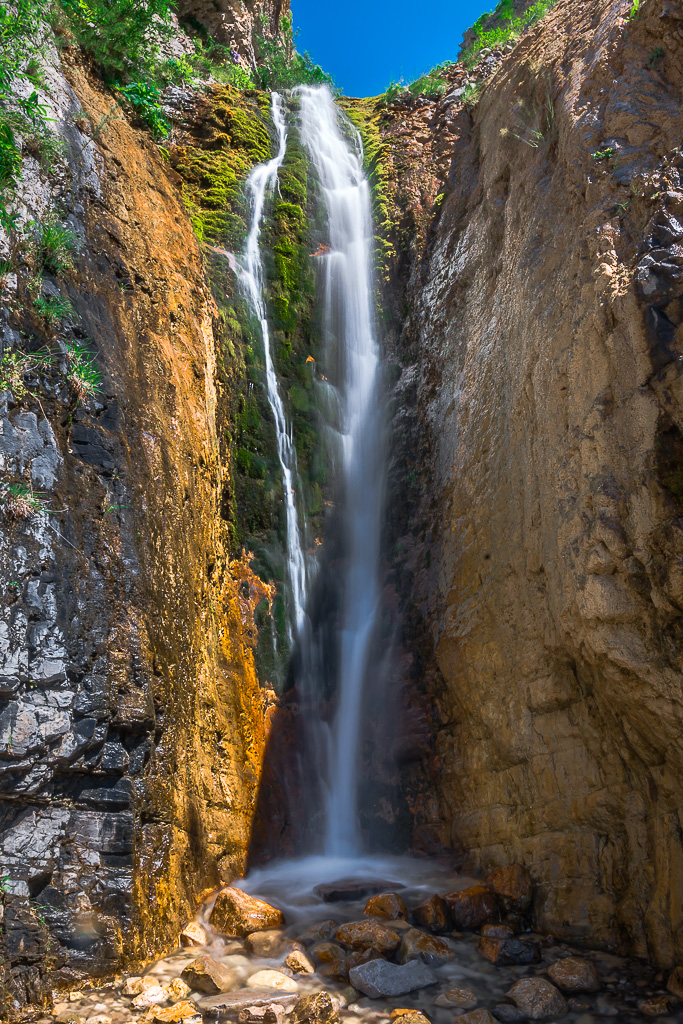
Furtoug waterfall

== Notable people ==
- Chakh Akhriev – the first Ingush ethnographer, historian and lawyer.
- Gapur Akhirev – one of the leaders of revolutionary struggle for power in the North Caucasus.
- Rashid-bek Akhriev – the first North Caucasian pilot
- Khadzhi-Bekir Akhriev – sculptor, the first professional painter in Ingushetia

== Sources ==
- Krupnov, E. I. (1960). Smirnov, A. P. (ed.). Древняя история Северного Кавказа [Ancient history of the North Caucasus] (in Russian). Moscow: Nauka. pp. 1–520.
