= Serdalo =

Weekly newspaper in Nazran, Ingushetia

- Type: Weekly newspaper
- Format: A3
- Editor-in-chief: Khadizhat Kurskieva
- Launched: May 1, 1923; 103 years ago
- Ceased publication: 1944–1957
- Relaunched: June 21, 1957
- Language: Russian, Ingush
- Headquarters: 60 Idris Bazorkin Avenue, Nazran
- City: Magas
- Country: Ingushetia, Russia
- Circulation: 2000
- Website: serdalo.ru

Serdalo (Russian: Сердало, Ingush: Сердало, lit. 'Light' (Note: The Ingush spelling for Serdalo in the 1920-1930s varied: until the beginning of 1924 it was spelled Sierdaluo, in the middle of 1924 - Serdalo, from the end of 1924 to June 1929 - Serdælo, from June 1929 - Serdalo, from September 1938 - Сердало (Serdalo; in Cyrillic script).)) is a weekly newspaper based in Nazran, Ingushetia.

== History ==
=== Early history ===
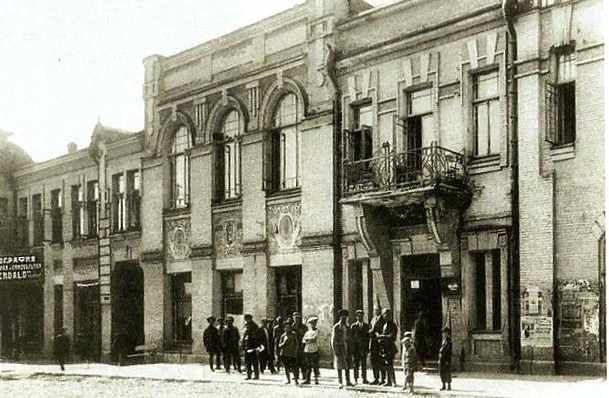
c. 1930s, Printing house of Serdalo, Vladikavkaz.

As a result of the birth of Ingush writing system, Serdalo newspaper launched on 1 May 1923 and originally also served as the organ of the Ingush district committee of the Communist Party and the Ingush district executive committee. Serdalo was the first newspaper published in Ingush. The date of its launch is considered to be birthday of Ingush literature by some authors, while others consider the birthday of Ingush literature the year 1921, when Zaurbek Maslagov first recorded ethnographic material in Ingush language. The founder of Serdalo was the Ingush linguist Zaurbek Maslagov who was its first editor. The executive secretary and proofreader was the Ingush writer and poet Tembot Bekov. The print circulation of the first issue was only 500.

The new Ingush Latin alphabet appeared in Serdalo, which contributed to the locals mastering writing. At the end of the 1920s, a literary page which contained the work of an Ingush writer appeared on every issue. For instance, such works like: May 1 by Sultan Aldiev, Early Spring by Tembot Bekov, as well as The Internationale, translated into Ingush, were published. In the 1925–1927s, plays by Zaurbek Malsagov: Abduction of a Maiden and Revenge were also published.

With regards to the literary pages in Serdalo, the first Ingush literary critic Ortskho Malsagov noted the potential of Ingush language in poetry:

"We see poems written in our native [Ingush] language, we see that our language is musical, rhythmic with the appropriate combination of words. We see that in our language it is brilliantly possible to select both adjacent and cross rhymes."

In 1928, the Ingush Publishing House "Serdalo" was organized in Vladikavkaz, under which the "Serdalo" Printing House was opened. In the 1920s, it was the main printed organ in Ingush Autonomous Oblast. Book publishing was of great importance during the cultural transformations in Ingush Autonomous Oblast, so in the period of 1926–1929, a total volume of 719 printed sheets were printed with a circulation of 367 000 copies.

Due to the 1944 deportation of the Chechens and Ingush, the publication of Serdalo stopped.

On 21 June 1957, Serdalo launched again after the restoration of Chechen-Ingush ASSR. The editor of Serdalo became Jabrail Khamatkhanov while its executive secretary became Khamzat Osmiev. Serdalo wrote about the return of Ingush people from the deportation, their settlement and the beginning of their working career.

In 1973, Serdalo received the Order of the Badge of Honour. As of 1976, Serdalo was issued thrice a week and was published in Grozny, the then capital of Checheno-Ingush ASSR.

After the establishment of Republic of Ingushetia, the place of publication Serdalo changed from Grozny to Nazran.

== Staff ==
=== 1920–1930 ===
The first editor-in-chief of Serdalo was the Ingush linguist Zaurbek Maslagov while its executive secretary and proofreader was the Ingush writer and poet Tembot Bekov.

=== 1950–1960 ===
After the relaunch of Serdalo in 1957, the chief editor became Jabrail Khamatkhanov while its executive secretary became Khamzat Osmiev. Serdalo wrote about the return of Ingush people from the deportation, their settlement and the beginning of their working career.

=== 2023 ===
As of 2023, the chief editor is Khadizhat Kurskieva while the managing editor is Ibragim Kurskiev.

== Bibliography ==
- Aliroev, I. Yu. (1990). Iriskhanov, I. A. (ed.). Язык, история и культура вайнахов [Language, history and culture of the Vainakhs] (in Russian). Grozny: Kniga. pp. 1–368. ISBN 5-766-0102-06.
- Dakhkilgov, I. A. (1975). Zyazikov, A. A. (ed.). Ингушская литература (период развития до 40-х годов) [Ingush literature (period of development until the 40s)] (in Russian). Grozny: Chech.-Ing. kn. izd-vo. pp. 1–186.
- Dakhkilgov, I. A.; Martazanova, Kh. M. (2013). "Профессиональная культура: Национальная литература" [Professional culture: National literature]. In Albogachieva, M. S.-G.; Martazanov, A. M.; Solovyeva, L. T. (eds.). Ингуши [The Ingush] (in Russian). Moskva: Nauka. pp. 380–391.
- Dolgieva, M. B.; Kartoev, M. M.; Kodzoev, N. D.; Matiev, T. Kh. (2013). Kodzoev, N. D.; et al. (eds.). История Ингушетии [History of Ingushetia] (4th ed.). Rostov-Na-Donu: Yuzhnyy izdatelsky dom. pp. 1–600. ISBN 978-5-98864-056-1.
- Gazdiev, A. (2022-11-16). "Заурбек Куразович Мальсагов — создатель и первый редактор ингушской газеты "Сердало"" [Zaurbek Kurazovich Malsagov - creator and first editor of the Ingush newspaper "Serdalo"]. Serdalo (in Russian). Magas, Ingushetia: Izd-vo Serdalo.
- "История: 100 лет назад вышел первый номер газеты «Сердало»" [History: 100 years ago the first issue of the newspaper "Serdalo" was published]. Ingushetia (in Russian). GAU redaktsiya gazety "Ingushetia". 2023-05-01.
- Malsagov, A. O. (1969). "О нарт-орстхойском эпосе ингушей и чеченцев" [About the Nart-Orstkhoy epic of the Ingush and Chechens]. In Petrosyan, A. A.; Alieva, A. I.; Gatsak, V. M.; Dalgat, U. B. (eds.). Сказания о нартах — эпос народов Кавказа [Tales of the Narts - the epic of the peoples of the Caucasus] (in Russian). Moskva: Nauka. pp. 255–281.
- Ozdoeva, M. (2023-05-01). "Из века в век: К 100-летию со дня рождения общенациональной газеты "Сердало" Ингушетии" [From century to century: To the 100th anniversary of the birth of the national newspaper "Serdalo" of Ingushetia]. Ingushetia (in Russian). GAU redaktsiya gazety "Ingushetia".
- "Сердало" [Serdalo]. Bolshaya sovetskaya entsoklopedia (in Russian). Vol. 23: Saflor - Soan. Moskva: Izd-vo Bolshaya sovetskaya entsoklopedia. 1976.
- Yandieva, M. J. (2023-07-03). "Мальсагов Заурбек Куразович" [Malsagov Zaurbek Kurazovich]. Great Russian Encyclopedia (in Russian).
