= Ingushetia (newspaper) =

Weekly newspaper based in Magas, Ingushetia, Russia

Ingushetia (Ghalghaiche)
- Type: Weekly newspaper
- Format: A3
- Owner: Government of Ingushetia
- Founder: Government of Ingushetia
- Publisher: GAU redaktsiya gazety "Ingushetia"
- Editor-in-chief: Shamsudin Bokov
- Launched: April 24, 1993; 32 years ago
- Language: Russian, Ingush
- Headquarters: st. Nikita Khrushchev, 12
- City: Magas
- Country: Ingushetia, Russia
- Circulation: 5000
- Website: gazetaingush.ru

Ingushetia (Ghalghaiche) (Russian: Ингушетия, Ingush: ГӀалгӀайче) is a weekly newspaper based in Magas, capital of Ingushetia, that also serves as the official press organ of the Government of Ingushetia. (Note: See Roskomnadzor.)

== History ==
On the basis of the Sunzha regional newspaper Banner of Labor, Ingushetia newspaper launched on 24 April 1993, though, the decree on the formation of the newspaper Ingushetia was signed later on 27 April 1993, by then the President of Ingushetia Ruslan Aushev. The first chief editor of Ingushetia became Khuseyn Shadiev.

In 2016, the editors of Ingushetia changed the format, design and frequency of the newspaper. Therefore, the newspaper became published weekly. In the same year, the online newspaper was launched which became the first state-owned information and analytical resource in Ingushetia.

== Bibliography ==
=== Russian sources ===
- "Об издании" [About the publication]. Ingushetia (in Russian). GAU redaktsiya gazety "Ingushetia". 2016-03-13. Archived from the original on 2017-01-04.
- "Ингушетия" [Ingushetia]. Roskomnadzor (in Russian). Archived from the original on 2021-12-25.
