= Nakh peoples =

Ethnolinguistic group

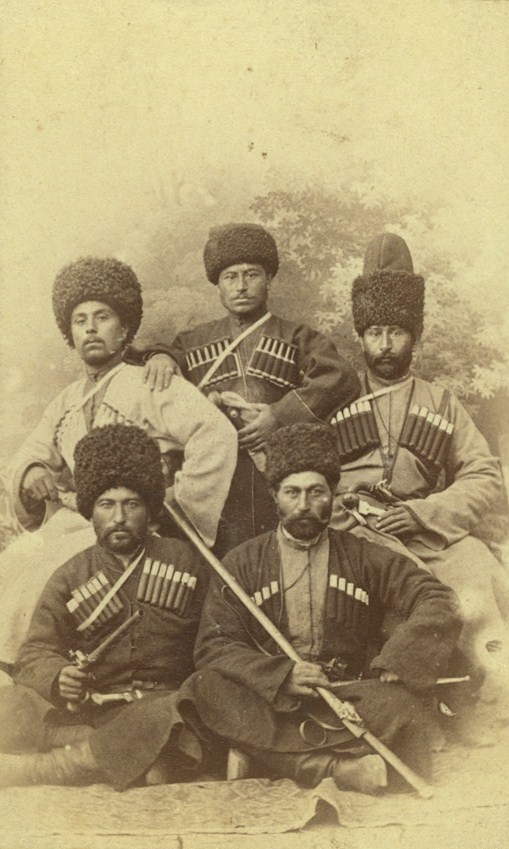
Chechens at a wedding, circa 1870–1886

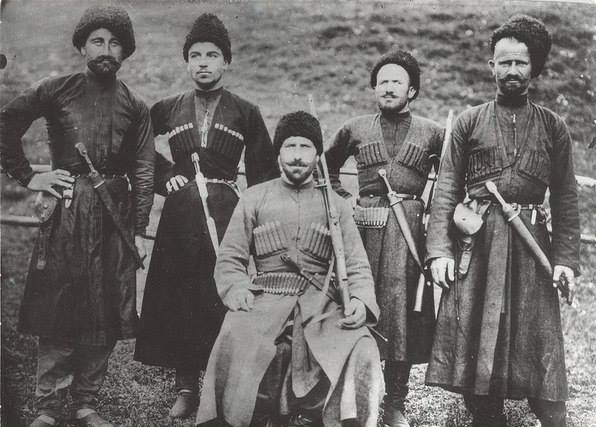
Ingush highlanders, early 20th century

The Nakh peoples are a group of North Caucasian peoples identified by their use of the Nakh languages and other cultural similarities. These are chiefly the ethnic Chechen, Ingush and Bats peoples of the North Caucasus, including closely related minor or historical groups.

== The ethnonyms "Vainakh" and "Nakh" ==
"Nakh peoples" and "Vainakh peoples" are two terms that were coined by Soviet ethnographers such as the Russian linguist Nikolai Yakovlev and Ingush ethnographer Zaurbek Malsagov. The reasoning behind the creation of these terms was to unite the closely related nations of Chechen and Ingush into one term. The terms "Vainakh" (our people) and "Nakh" (people) were first used as a term to unite two peoples in 1928. It was subsequently popularized by other Soviet authors, poets, and historians such as Mamakaev and Volkova in their research. According to the historian Victor Schnirelmann, the terms "Vainakh" and "Nakh" were introduced more actively during the period from the 1960s through the 1980s. The first documented collective term used to refer to the Nakh peoples in general, "Kists" was introduced by Johann Anton Güldenstädt in the 1770s. Julius von Klaproth believed the term Kists only applied to the Kistin society of Ingushetia, and instead used the Tatar term "Mizdschegi" to refer to the Nakh peoples.

== The ethnonym "Nakhchi" ==
The term Nakhchiy (in the form of Natschkha, Nakhchui and Nacha) at the end of the 18th and beginning of 19th centuries was mentioned as the name (i.e. exonym) that the Ingush gave to the Chechens and not as the self-name of the Ingush. Starting in the second half of the 19th century, the term was used by some Russian officers, historians and linguists for both the Chechen and Ingush nations (and sometimes for the Batsbi, notably by Peter von Uslar). Today, the term is in its modern lowland version of "Nokhchi" and is only used by Chechens and Pankisi Kists. In 1859, Adolf Berge was the second one to use this term for both the Chechens and Ingush. The famous Russian linguist Peter von Uslar, who studied the North Caucasian languages, also referred to both nations in 1888 as "Nakhchuy"/"Nakhchiy". This classification was also used by Potto, Veidenbaum, Gan, Dubrovin and many others during the 19th century.

According to Umalat Laudaev, the first Chechen ethnographer and historian, Nazranians (a subgroup of Ingush) used this ethnonym occasionally:

The Shatois and Nazranians are reluctant to call themselves Nakhchoy, which stems from their previous hostile attitudes towards the Chechens. But with the outpouring of heartfelt feelings at meetings, at a party, on the way, etc. they always confirm their unity of tribe, expressing themselves: "We are common brothers (wai tsa vezherey detsy)" or "We are the same Nakhchoy (wai tsa nakhchoy du)".

— Umalat Laudaev, "Collection of information about the Caucasian highlanders, Vol. VI."

However, it was mentioned by Peter Simon Pallas in the late 18th century that a clear distinction between self-designation of the Ingush and Chechens had already existed:

There is a tribe of people differing entirely from all other inhabitants of the Caucasus, in language as well as in stature, and features of the countenance: the Galgai or Ingush, also referred to as Lamur, meaning "inhabitants of mountains". Their nearest relatives, both by consanguinity and language, are the Chechens, whom they call Natschkha.

— Peter Simon Pallas, "Travels Through the Southern Provinces of the Russian Empire, in the Years 1793 and 1794"

The 19th-century historian Bashir Dalgat published several works about Chechen and Ingush ethnography. He proposed to use the term "Nakhchuy" for both the Chechens and Ingush. This, however, had no fruition in Caucasology, mainly due to the fact that the Ingush commonly referred to themselves as "Ghalghaï", while the Chechens called themselves "Nakhchoy" or "Nokhchoy".

The oldest mention of Nakhchiy occurred in 1310 by the Georgian Patriarch Cyril Donauri, who mentions the "People of Nakhche" among Tushetians, Avars and many other Northeast Caucasian nations. The term Nakhchiy has also been connected to the city Nakhchivan and the nation of Nakhchamatyan (mentioned in the 7th-century Armenian work Ashkharhatsuyts) by many Soviet and modern historians. Chechen manuscripts in Arabic from the early 1820s do mention a certain Nakhchuvan (near modern-day Kagizman, Turkey) as the homeland of all Nakhchiy.

=== Etymology of the ethnonym Nakhchi ===
The etymology of "Nakhchi" is believed to have come from "Nakh" (people) + "-chi" (suffix) or "Nakh" (people) + "Chuo" (territory). Chechen researcher Ahmad Suleymanov claimed that the terms "Nakh" and "Nakhchi" are not the same, and have different foundations and different origins. Many historians such as Potto, Berge, Gan, Dubrovin believed that it meant "the nation". Linguists like Arbi Vagapov have also pointed out that similar terms are found in other Northeast Caucasian languages such as Rutul where "Nukhchi" translates to "Tribesman".

Chechen ethnographer Umalat Laudaev offered a different etymology for the origin of the ethnonym Nakhchi:

In primitive times, having not yet been acquainted with arable farming, for lack of bread they (lowland Chechens) ate a large amount of cheese; boasting of their abundance in front of their compatriots who lived in the meager Argun mountains and populous Ichkeria, they called themselves in Chechen "Nakhchoy". Cheese in Chechen is called "nakhchi"; the plural form of the word is "nakhchiy", hence the popular name "Nakhchoy", that is, "people abounding with cheese." It is also possible that this name was ascribed to the lowland Chechens as a mockery, calling them raw foodists, just as today the Nadterechny Chechens are mockingly called "kaldash yuts nakh", that is, people who eat cottage cheese. That the Chechens got the name "Nakhchoy" from cheese is also confirmed by the fact that the Nazrans, who do not speak in the same Chechen language, call cheese "nakhchi", and the Chechens – "Nakhchiy".

— Umalat Laudaev, "Collection of information about the Caucasian highlanders, Vol. VI."

This version has been criticized by many authors including the Chechen linguist I. Aliroev who believed the etymology made no sense. Linguists and historians such as Shavlaeva and Tesaev, however, believed the etymology confused "Nakhch" (cheese) with the Chechen term "Nakhch" (processed), which has the same root. In their version, the etymology would mean "the processed ones" (i.e. the people who are accepted in society due to their qualities and lineage). Authors such as Berge mentioned also that the term "Nakhchi" could mean "the people of excellence".

=== Historical mentions of Nakhchi ===
Historical mentions
Name	Author	Source	Date
Nakhche	Archbishop Cyril Donauri	Historical document	1310
Nakhshai	Sala-Uzden Prince Adzhi	Historical letter	1756
Natschkha	Peter Simon Pallas	"Travels through the southern provinces of the Russian Empire in the years 1793 and 1794"	1793
Nakhchui	Julius Klaproth	"Description of trips to the Caucasus and Georgia in 1807 and 1808"	1807
Nacha	Semyon Bronevsky	"News of the Caucasus"	1823
Nakhchoy	Chechen Manuscript	"Migration from Nakhchuvan"	1828
Nakhche	Adolf Berge	"Chechnya and Chechens"	1859
Nakhchoy	Kedi Dosov	"Nakhchoyn Juz"	1862
Nakhche	Nikolai Dubrovin	"History of war and domination of Russians in the Caucasus"	1871
Nakhchoy	Umalat Laudaev	"The Chechen Tribe"	1872
Nakhche	Kerovbe Patkanian	"Armenian geography of the 7th century AD"	1877

== The ethnonym "Ghalghaï" ==
Ghalghaï (Ingush: ГIалгIай, [ˈʁəlʁɑj]) is the self-name of the Ingush, a Caucasian people, that is most often associated with the word "ghāla" (гIала) – meaning "tower" or "fortress" and the plural form of the suffix of person – "gha" (гIа), thus, translated as "people/inhabitants of towers", though according to some researchers the ethnonym has a more ancient origin. Some scholars associate it with the ancient Gargareans and Gelaï mentioned in the 1st century in the work of the ancient historian and geographer Strabo. In Georgian sources, in the form of Gligvi, modern researchers mention them living in the Darial Gorge at the time of the deployment of Mirian I's forces into the Darial Pass in the 1st century. They are also mentioned in the 18th century edition of Georgian Chronicles during the reign of Kvirike III. In Russian sources, "Ghalghaï" first becomes known in the second half of the 16th century, in the form of "Kolkans"/"Kalkans", "Kolki"/"Kalki", "Kalkan people". The famous Georgian historian and linguist Ivane Javakhishvili proposed to use Ghalghaï (Georgian: Ghilghuri or Ghlighvi) as a general name or classification for the Ingush, Chechen and Bats languages:

"Chachnuri" (Chechen) – i.e. "Nakhchouri" (Nakhchoy), "Ingushuri" (Ingush) – i.e. "Kisturi" (Kist) in the North Caucasus, and "Tsovuri" (Tsova) – i.e. "Batsburi" (Batsbi) in Georgia, in the Tushin community, constitute another separate group, which currently does not have its own common distinct name. In ancient times, Greek and Roman geographers called the native inhabitants of the middle and eastern parts of the North Caucasus – "Geli" and "Legi". The name Geli (Gelae) is the equivalent of the modern "Ghalgha", as pronounced in their own language and in the Tushin language; and the equivalent of Legi is the Georgian "Lekebi" (Leks, Avars). In Georgian, the first corresponds to "Ghilghvi" (singular) and "Ghilghvelebi" (plural), which are often found in old Tushin folk poems. And in other regions of Georgia, it is customary to designate them as "Ghlighvi". Since there is no common name for the above three languages, such a name is necessary, therefore, instead of an artificially invented name, it is better to use the (traditional) name that existed in antiquity. It is with this in mind that I choose to present this group of languages – Chachnuri (Chechen), Kisturi (Ingush) and Tsovuri (Tsova, i.e. Batsbi) — under the general name "Ghilghuri" (Ghalghaï)

— I. Javakhishvili, "The initial structure and relationship of the Georgian and Caucasian languages." Tbilisi, 1937. / p. 97

== History ==
Antiquity

Earliest mention of the Nakh people was the Malkh Kingdom by Greco-Syrian writer Lucian.

9th–12th centuries
An association of clans called Durdzuks (Durdzuki) is mentioned by the Persian writers Ibn al-Faqih and Al-Baladhuri in the 9th to 10th centuries, stating "the construction of Chosroes Anushirvanom (VI) in Durzukia 12 gates and stone fortifications".
1239
Destruction of the Alania capital of Maghas (both names known solely from Muslim Arabs) and Alan confederacy of the Northern Caucasian highlanders, nations, and tribes by Batu Khan (a Mongol leader and a grandson of Genghis Khan). "Maghas was destroyed in the beginning of 1239 by the hordes of Batu Khan. Historically, Maghas was located at approximately the same place on which the new capital of Ingushetia is now built." However, there are many other theories as to where Maghas was originally located, such as in Chechnya, Kabardino-Balkaria or North-Ossetia.
13th–14th centuries
Independence wars against Tatar-Mongol hordes and the army of Tamerlane.
14th–16th centuries
The State of Simsir was a union of Vainakh teips. They started a national struggle of liberation from the Golden Horde. After the Mongol invasion, Islam started its spread in the region. The spread of Islam seems to have started in the lowland part of the Vainakh states at this time, associated with the advent of the Arabic language and Arabic writing. Inscriptions on monuments from this time, preserved in some Vainakh villages, also testify to this.
17th century – present
Ongoing struggle over the independence of Chechnya; Ingush remain less openly rebellious, but still have a particularly problematic conflict with the Ossetes; Batsbi and Kists are considered Georgians and are part of Georgia (living mainly in the Tusheti region).
1829–1859
Caucasian Imamate
1917–1922
Mountainous Republic of the Northern Caucasus
1919–1920
North Caucasian Emirate
1921–1924
Mountain Autonomous Soviet Socialist Republic of the Russian SFSR

== Social structure ==
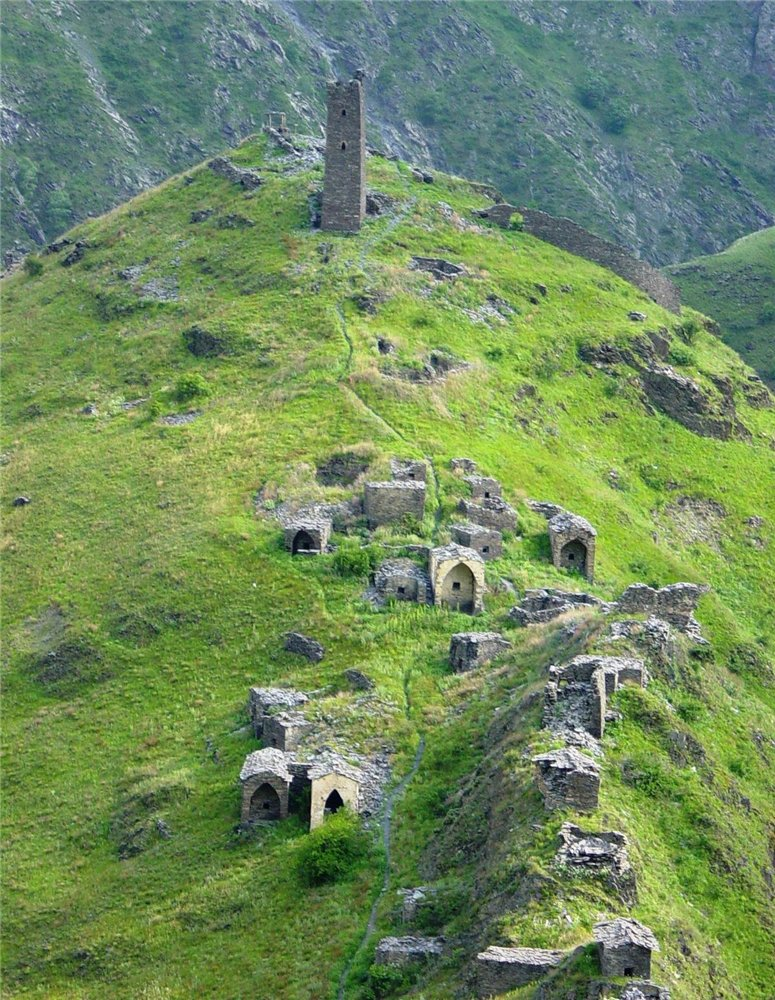
Necropolis in Itum Kale (Chechnya), and tower of Tsoi-Pheda protecting the peace of the dead.

Traditionally, Nakh peoples were known as a society with a highly developed and complex clan system. Individuals are united in family groups called "Tsa" – house. Several Tsas are part of the "Gar" -branch or "Nekh"-road, a group of Gars is in turn called a teip, a unit of tribal organization of Vainakh people. Teip has its own Council of Elders and unites people from the political, economic and military sides. Teips leave all cases to the democratically elected representatives of houses i.e. "Tsa". The number of participants of Teipan-Kheli depends on the number of houses.

Some believe that most teips made unions called shahars and tukkhums, a military-economic or military-political union of teips. However, this has been heavily disputed by several historians and ethnographers, including Dalgat who claims that most Chechens never used tukkhums. He also claims that they were only used by some societies in the lowlands.

The national scale issues were addressed through Mehk-Khel, the People's Council. Representatives of the Council were elected by each Teip Council and had an enormous influence on the destiny of the people. They could start a war or prohibit and prevent any teip from starting one. Mehk-Khel could gather in different places at different times. It used to gather in Terloy-Mokhk and Akkhi-Mokhk's Galain-Chozh region. A gigantic Mehk-Kheli stone still stands in Galain-Chozh, around which Mehk-Kheli members solved issues.

=== Political structure ===
Chechen-Ingush society has customarily been egalitarian, unstratified, and classless. Traditionally, there was no formal political organization and no political or economic ranking. Many observers, including famous Russians such as Leo Tolstoy, have been very impressed by the democratic nature of the indigenous Chechen governments prior to Russian conquest. According to the Western Ichkerophile Tony Wood, the Vainakh peoples, in particular the Chechens (as the Ingush and the Batsbi have fallen under foreign domination much more frequently and as a result, the indigenous system and democratic values are less deeply ingrained), could be described as one of the few nations in the world with an indigenous system highly resemblant of democracy (others cited are often Scots, Albanians and Basques; notably, all three, much like the Vainakh peoples, are mountain dwelling peoples with a clan-based social organization and a strong attachment to the concept of freedom). In the late 18th and early 19th centuries, a couple of Circassian tribes overthrew their traditional aristocracy and established a democratic, egalitarian society, with some adoptions from the Nakh system. This advance, which may have spread eventually to all of the Circassian tribes, was halted by their political state being annihilated by Russian conquest, a fate later shared by the rest of the Caucasus.

It is notable that the Chechen and Ingush systems, as well as the system later adopted from them by some Eastern Circassian tribes, resembles the typical Western democratic republic. It has a central government with a legislative body (the Mehk-Khel), a body resemblant of an executive branch (the Mehk-Khetasho) as well as a judicial branch (the other councils). The adat and other bodies have served as the constitution. The members of all three of the main national councils of the nation were elected, producing an indigenous democracy of the Nakh peoples.

During the Soviet Union period, as well as during Ramzan Kadyrov's regime, the Teip-Council system was strongly criticized by the federal and local administration installed in Chechnya and Ingushetia, who viewed it as a destabilizing force and an obstacle to maintaining order. They said that such a system was illustrative of the anarchic nature of the Caucasian ethos.

The democratic and egalitarian nature, the values of freedom and equality of Chechen society have been cited as factors contributing to their resistance to Russian rule (in addition, there was no elite to be coopted by Tsarist authorities, as Wood notes).

== Tower architecture ==
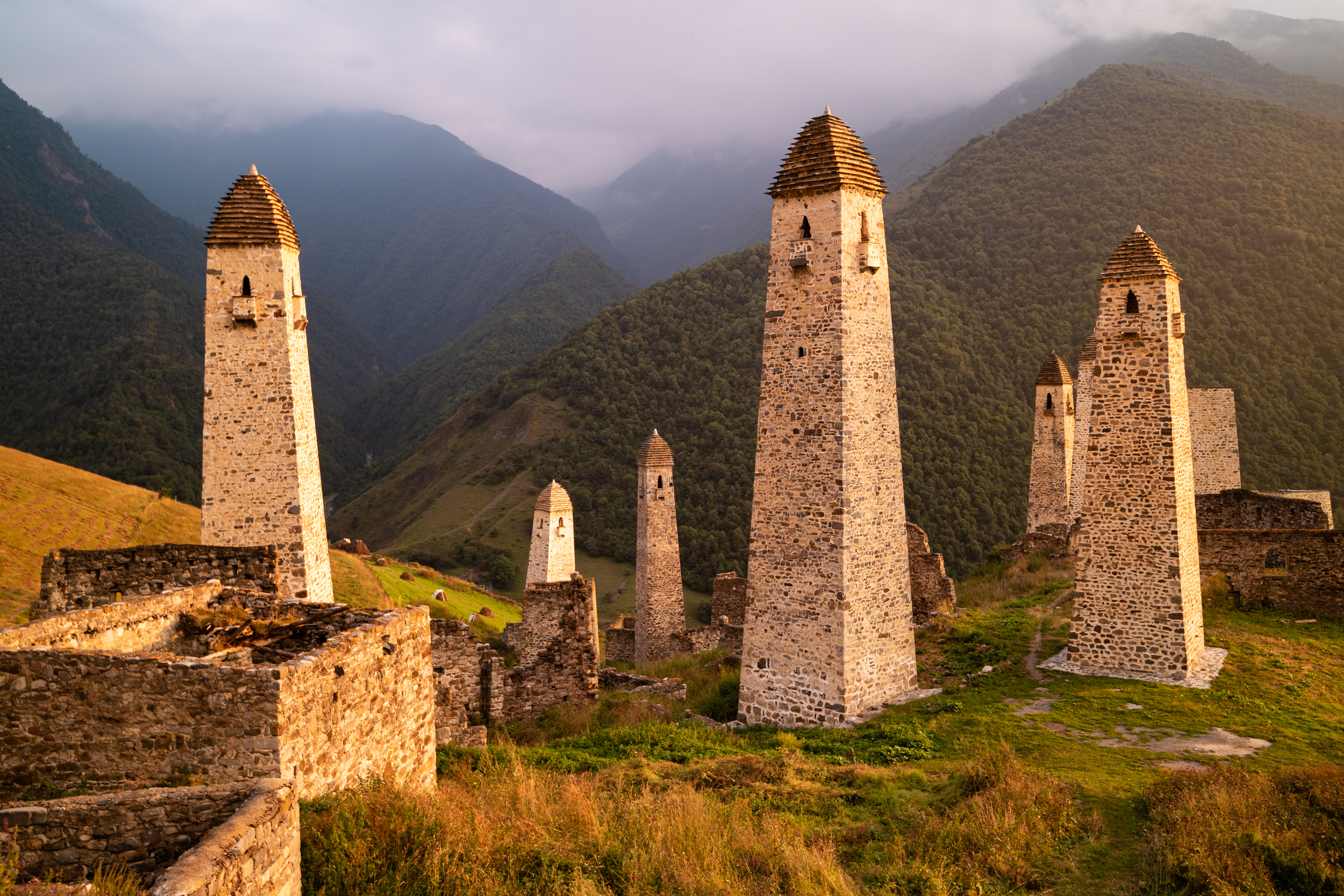
Ruins of the medieval settlement Erzi (Ingushetia)

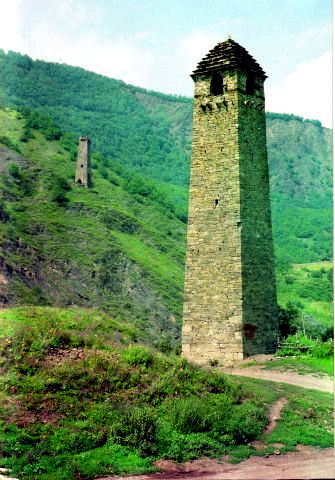
Chechen military tower near settlement Chanta

A characteristic feature of Vainakh architecture in the Middle Ages, rarely seen outside Chechnya and Ingushetia, was the Vainakh tower. This was a kind of multi-floor structure that was used for dwelling or defense (or both). Nakh tower architecture and construction techniques reached their peak from the 15th to 17th centuries.

Residential towers had two or three floors, supported by a central pillar of stone blocks, and were topped with flat shale roofing. These towers have been compared in character to the prehistoric mountain settlements dating to 8000 BC.

Military ("combat") towers were 25 meters high or more, with four of five floors and a square base approximately six meters wide. Access to the second floor was through a ladder. The defenders fired at the enemy through loopholes. The top of the tower had mashikul – overhanging small balconies without a floor. These towers were usually crowned with pyramid-shaped roofing built in steps and topped with a sharpened capstone.

Buildings combining the functions of residential and military towers were intermediate in size between the two types, and had both loop-holes and mashikuls. Nakh towers used to be sparingly decorated with religious or symbolic petrographs, such as solar signs or depictions of the author's hands, animals, etc. Military towers often bore a Golgotha cross.

== Traditional economy ==
=== Agricultural structures ===
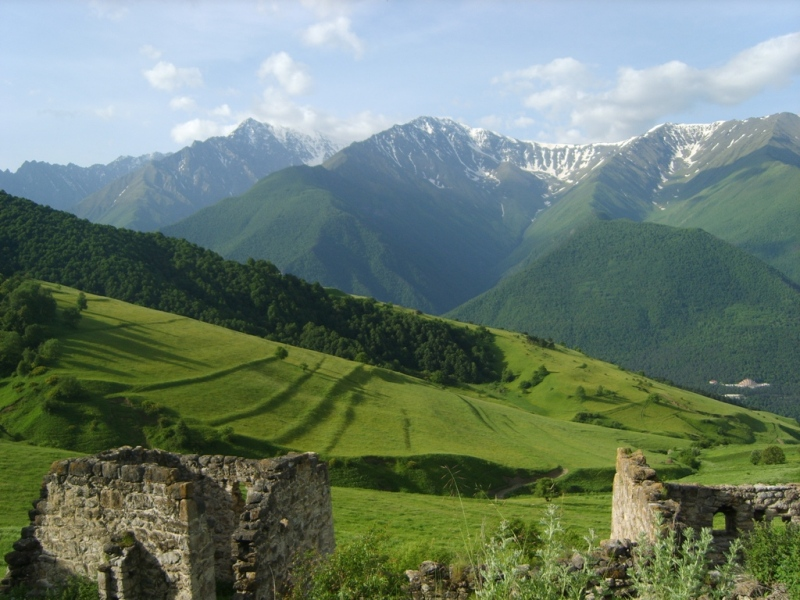
Ruins of ancient Ingush settlement, and agricultural terraces behind.

Lack of arable land in sufficient quantities in the mountainous areas forced Vainakhs to use their territory of residence as efficiently as possible. They leveled the steep slopes and organized terraces suitable for agriculture. On the barren rocky slopes of rocks, which are unsuitable for agriculture, Vainakhs hew foundations for terraces. On carts, they harnessed donkeys and oxen to bring black soil of the lowlands and filled artificial terraces with it. For maximum harvest was organized by the entire irrigation system, which consisted of small artificial stream canals connected with the mountain rivers. These canals were called Taatol. They also built small stone canals called Epala and small wooden troughs Aparri. Some scholars, notably I. Diakonov and S. Starostin, proposed that Epala and Aparri may correspond to Urartian irrigation canal name "pili" and Hurrian "pilli/a". Some irrigation structures were built also on lowlands but they were less complicated.

=== Vehicles ===
Carts and carriages made by Vainakh masters were highly valued in the region and beyond. Products of Vainakh masters brought power not only to the Caucasian peoples, but also by such excess power to the established industry of Russia. To support non-competitive domestic producers, Russia overlaid Vainakh manufacturers with large fees after complaints from the Terek Cossacks in their letters to the Russian government. In 1722 the Russian Army bought 616 vehicles for 1308 rubles, at a time when the annual salary of the governor of the three villages was only 50 rubles.

=== Carpet weaving ===
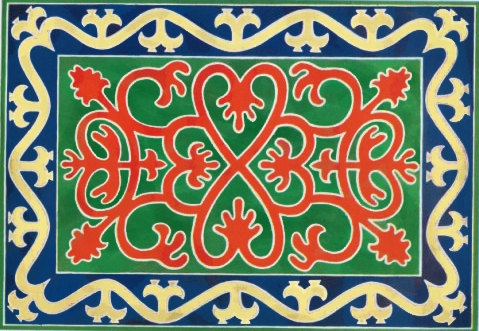
Nakh traditional feasting carpet: Isting/Istang

Since ancient times Ingush and Chechens have been producing thin felt carpets called Isting (Ingush) or Istang (Chechen). Ingush and Chechen rugs are distinguished by a peculiar pattern and high quality. Jacob Reineggs, who visited the region in the 18th century, noticed that Chechen and Ingush women skillfully manufactured carpets and fringes. Vainakh carpets were divided among themselves into different groups dependent on patterns:

- Сarpet with colorful ornaments (Chechen: Khorza istang), (Ingush: Khoza isting).
- Rug with fringe (Chechen: Khinja yolu istang), (Ingush: Chachakh isting).
- Plain rug, without any decorations or ornaments.
- Thick floor rugs (Chechen: Kuuz), (Ingush: Kuvz)
- Expensive wall carpet (Chechen: Pals)
Rugs and carpets

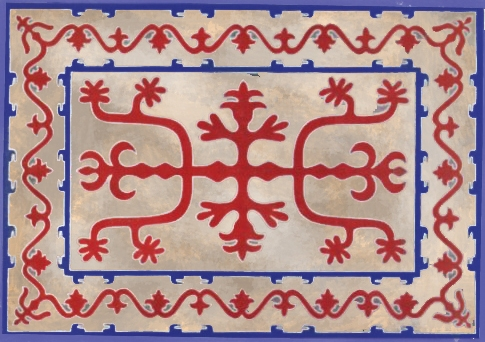

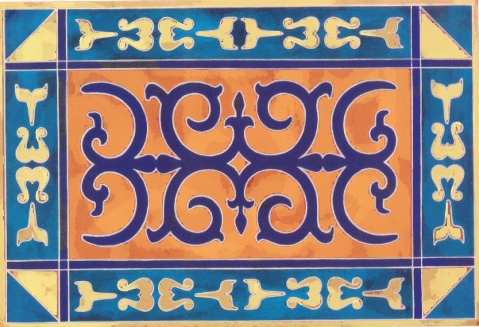

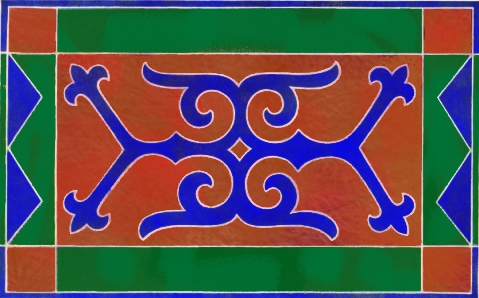

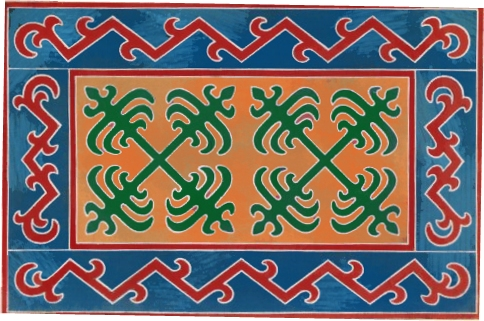

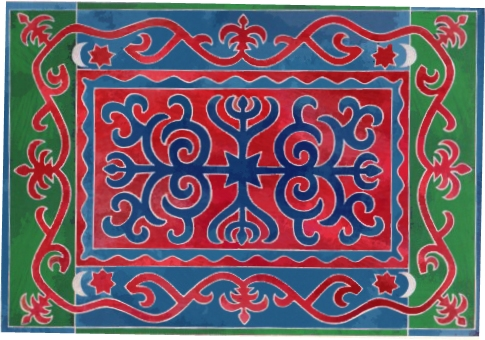

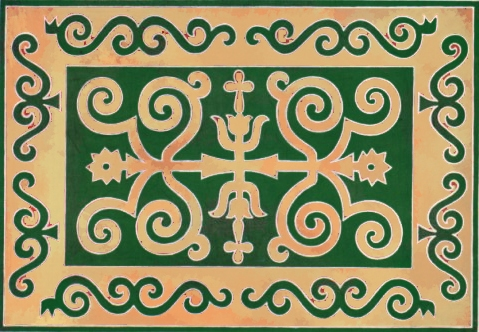

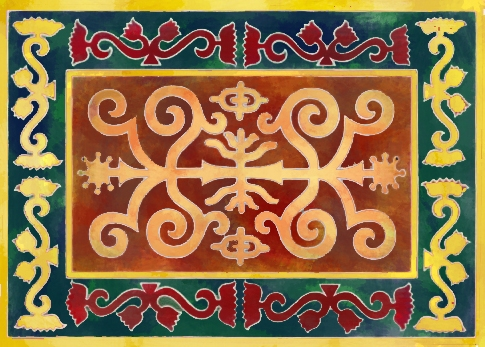

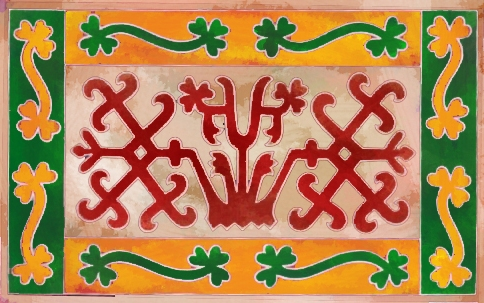

== Religion ==
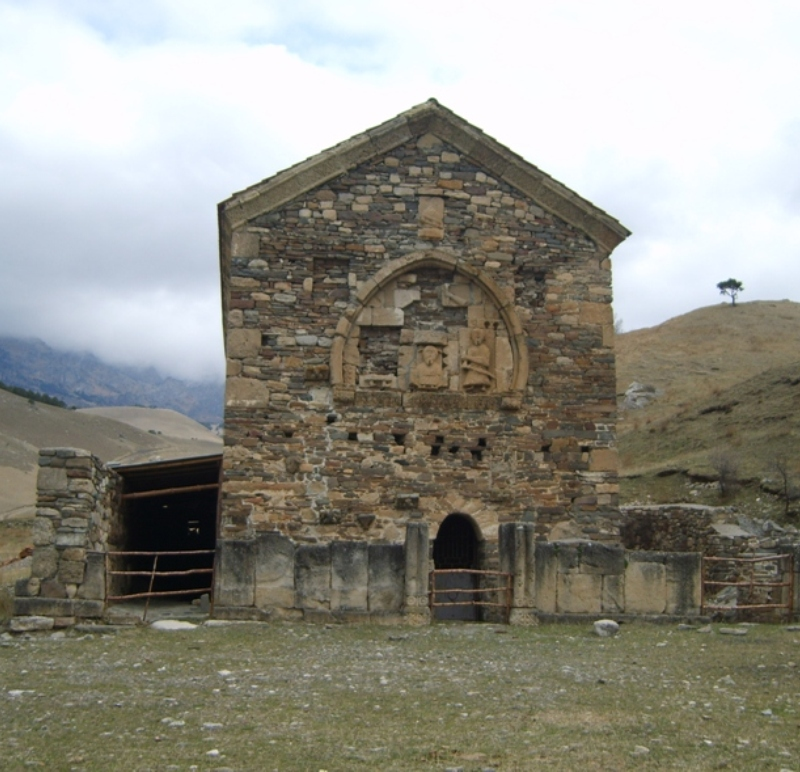
Tkhaba-Yerdy Church in Ingushetia.

During the Middle Ages, Vainakh society felt a strong Byzantine influence that led to the adoption of Eastern Orthodox Christianity in some parts of the country (particularly the mountainous South). However, Christianity did not last long. After the devastation of the country by Tamerlane, Christianity was extinguished (due to the temporary loss of contacts between Georgia and Nakh Christians) and gradually the Chechens and Ingush returned to their native, pagan beliefs (while the Bats were permanently Christianized). Islam began to spread on Nakh peoples lands from 16th and 17th centuries.

Vainakhs are predominantly Muslim of the Shafi`i school of thought of Sunni Islam. The majority of Chechens (approx. 2 million) and Ingush (approx. 1 million people) are Muslim of the Shafi`i school. Kists (about 15,400 people) are mainly Sunni Muslims with a Georgian Orthodox minority, while Bats (approx. 3,000 people) are Christian (Georgian Orthodox).

By rite, most Chechens are Qadiris, with a considerable Naqshbandi minority. There is also a tiny Salafi minority (Sunni sect). The two main groups (Salafism is more of a modern introduction to the region, and is still considered to be completely foreign) have often had divergent responses to events (for example, the Qadiri authorities initially backing the Bolsheviks who promised to grant freedom to the Chechens from Russia; while the Naqshbandis were more sceptical of the Bolsheviks' sincerity).

Burial vaults or crypts remained from the pagan period in the history of Vainakhs, before some of them converted to Islam in the 16th century (Islam has spread throughout the entire region only in the 17th century). They were built either a bit deepening into the ground or half underground and on the surface. The latter formed whole "towns of the dead" on the outskirts of the villages and reminded sanctuaries from the outside, with a dummy vaults constructed of overlapping stones. The deceased were placed on the special shelves in the crypts, in clothes and decorations and arms.

The general Islamic rituals established burials with the further penetration of Islam inside the mountainous regions of Chechnya and Ingushetia. Stone steles, churts, inscribed with prayers and epitaphs, began to be erected at the graves, and more prosperous mountaineers were honoured with mausoleums after death. The Borgha-Kash Mausoleum dating to the very beginning of the 15th century and built for a Noghai prince is a good example of this.

=== Legends and mythology ===
Only a few fragments of Vainakh mythology have survived to modern times. These fragments consist of the names of deities personifying elements of animist ideas, the Nart sagas, cosmogonic tradition, remnants of stock-breeding and landtilling, totemic beliefs, and folk calendar.

The greatest samples of Nakh mythology are the legends of Pkharmat, Lake Galanchozh, the epic war of Pkhagalberi (hare riders) dwarves against the Narts, Lake Kezenoyam, and myths about how sun, moon and stars appeared.

The Nakh myth recounts the tale of the legendary figure Pkharmat, who was purportedly shackled atop Mount Kazbek by God Sela as punishment for his audacious theft of heavenly fire. This narrative bears notable similarities to the Greek myth of Prometheus and the Georgian myth of Amirani. The legendary war of Pkhalberi (hare riders) dwarves against the Narts can be compared to the Greek myth of "Cranes and Pygmies war". The Golden Fleece myth appears to be intricately intertwined with the Nakh 11-year calendar tradition. According to this myth, a ram's skin was ceremonially placed within an oak frame known as "Jaar" for a duration of 11 years, eventually yielding the revered Golden Fleece known as "Dasho Ertal."

==== Legend of Kouzan-Am Lake ====
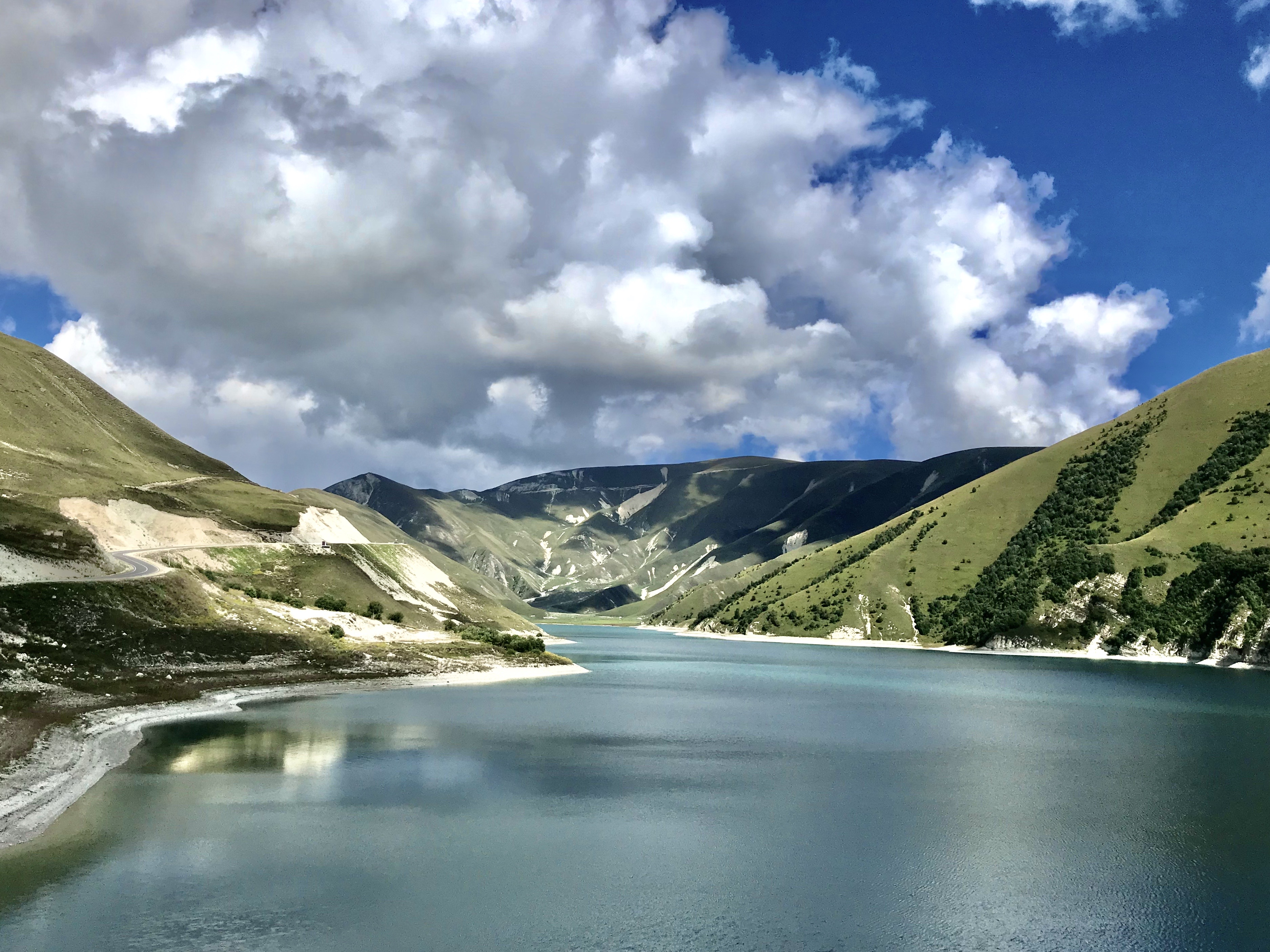
Lake Kezenoyam

This legend has explicit parallels with Biblical Sodom and Gomorrah, Grecian Baucis and Philemon, and the Islamic Lot. It relates that there once stood a very rich town at the place where now there is only a lake. Despite their great wealth, the people of this town were afflicted with insatiable greed and covetousness. Thus it came to pass that the supreme god Dela sent his representatives in the guise of beggars, to test them. They begged the wealthy citizens to give them food, but were driven away with only blows and curses in return. Only one poor family in the village shared their food with them, keeping only a morsel of burnt bread for themselves, while giving an unburnt loaf of fine white bread to their guests. On leaving the house, the grateful strangers told the family that after some time had passed, water would begin to form puddles outside their front door, and that when this happened they should gather up only the barest of necessities, leave their home, and go to the mountains. The poor family heeded this advice, but, before departing for higher ground, warned the rich of the town of the impending disaster, and begged them to follow them, but, such was the avarice of the rich folk, that they would not abandon their treasures – not even to save themselves from a watery grave. That evening, the family watched from the mountains as a terrible catastrophe unfolded: they saw the water cover their house and with it the greedy folk who had stayed behind. To commemorate the terrible flood, the Vainakhs named the newly-formed lake Kouzan-am/Kezenoyam 'lake of sorrow and cruelty'.

Interestingly, the tradition of an ancient settlement associated with the lake is borne out by the archeological record for the area: traces of human habitation dating back as far as 40,000 BC have been found near Kouzan-am. Cave paintings, artifacts, and other archaeological evidence bear witness to continuous habitation for some 8,000 years. People living in these settlements used tools, fire, and clothing made of animal skins.

==== Legend of Galain-Am Lake ====
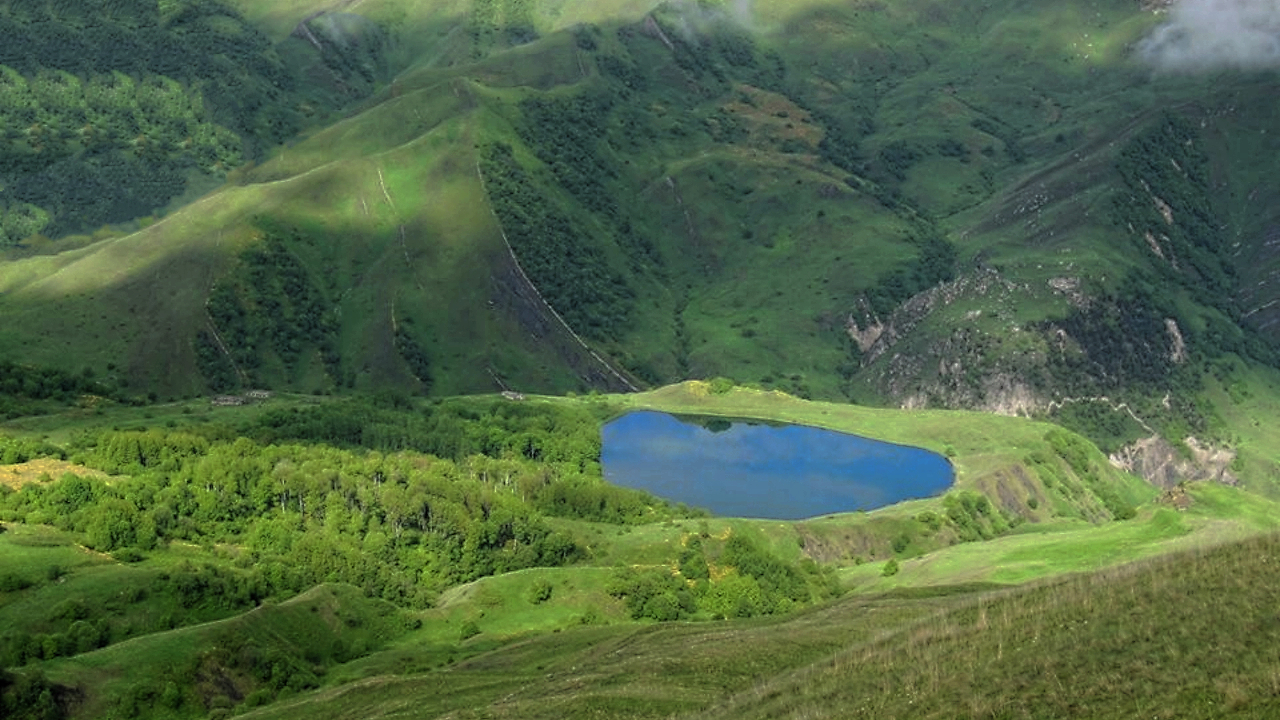
Galain-Am Lake

Legend has it that two women once decided to wash their laundry in the purest water to be found near their village, and that this water proved to be that of the sacred Lake Galain-am, abode of Tusholi, daughter of the Vainakh supreme deity Dela. The goddess, outraged at such sacrilege, punished the offenders by turning them into two stones. This, however, did not solve the problem of the ritually impure lake and the enraged goddess could no longer bear to dwell in its sullied waters. Emerging from them, she assumed the form of a supernatural bull, and began systematically to destroy the villages that dotted the hillside. This destruction continued until, at last, the bull was tamed in the aul of Ame in the area named Galain-Chazh (after the Galai teip, a clan later deported en masse to Kazakhstan in 1944). The inhabitants of Galain-Chazh harnessed the energies of the newly-tamed animal, availing themselves of its mighty strength to plough their fields; but the following Spring torrential rain began to fall upon the fields which the sacred animal had ploughed. This pelting rain continued to flood the fields until at last they disappeared beneath the waters of a new lake, into which Tusholi gratefully disappeared, rejoicing in the purity of her newly-formed abode.

==== Cosmology and creation ====
In ancient Nakh cosmology, the universe was created by the supreme god Dela. Earth, created in three years, was three times larger than the heavens and was propped up on gigantic bull horns. The realm of the Vainakh Gods lay above the clouds. Ishtar-Deela was the ruler of the subterranean world, Deeli-Malkhi. Deeli-Malkhi was larger than the human realm and took seven years to create. Nakhs believed that when the sun sets in the west it goes to the netherworld and rises out of it in the east. Deeli-Malkhi was not an evil realm of the dead or undead, but not far removed in morality from the upper world – even superior to it in some respects – most notably in its social structures. Unlike in certain other religions, there was no judgment in the afterlife. Dela-Malkh was the sun god playing a central role in religious celebrations. On December 25, Nakhs celebrated the Sun Festival in honour of the Sun God's birthday.

The names of stars and constellations were also connected to myths:

- Milky Way as the route of scattered straw (Chechen: Ča Taqina Tača)
- Great Bear as the seven brothers’ seven stars (Chechen: Vorx Vešin Vorx Seda) meets 7 sons of the god of the universe Tq'a. In the Ingush version of the legend Pkharmat, seven sons of Tq'a were punished by his wife Khimekhninen for help Magal, stealing fire from Tq'a. She lifted them up into the air, far from land that they have become the seven stars.
- Gemini (Chechen: Kovreģina Seda)
- Sirius, Betelgeuse and Procyon as Tripodstar (Chechen: Qokogseda)
- Orion as Evening star (Chechen: Märkaj Seda)
- Capricornus as Roofing towers (Chechen: Neģara Bjovnaš)
- Venus depending on daytime as sunset star (Chechen: Sadov Seda) and sunrise star (Chechen: Saxül Seda). The name of the planet is Dilbat

== Genetics ==
A 2011 study by Oleg Balanovsky and a number of other geneticists showed that the Y-DNA haplogroup J2a4b* (a subclade of J2, located mainly in the Middle East, Caucasus and Mediterranean) was highly associated with Nakh peoples. J2a4b* accounted for the majority of the Y-chromosomes of Ingush and Chechen men, with the Ingush having a much higher percentage, 87.4%, than Chechens, who had 51–58% depending on region (the lowest being in Malgobek, the highest in Dagestan and Achkhoy-Martan). In their paper, Balanovsky et al. speculated that the differences between fraternal Caucasian populations may have arisen due to genetic drift, which would have had a greater effect among the Ingush than the Chechens due to their smaller population. The Chechens and the Ingush have the highest frequencies of J2a4b* yet reported (other relatively high frequencies, between 10 and 20 percent, are found in the Mediterranean and Georgia).

== Hypotheses of origins ==
The Vainakh have been referred to by various names, including Durdzuks in medieval Arab, Georgian and Armenian ethnography.

Historical linguists, including Johanna Nichols, have connected ancestral Nakh languages and their distant relatives to a Neolithic migration from the Fertile Crescent.

Igor Diakonoff and Sergei Starostin have suggested that Nakh is distantly related to Hurro-Urartian, which they included as a branch of the Northeastern Caucasian language family (which were dubbed Alarodian languages by Diakonoff). Several studies argue that the connection is probable. Other scholars, however, doubt that the language families are related, or believe that, while a connection is possible, the evidence is far from conclusive. Various interpretations of the Nakh-Urartian relationship exist: another, held by Kassian (2011), is that Urartian and Nakh's common vocabulary instead reflects a history of intense borrowing from Urartian into Nakh.

According to Amjad Jaimoukha, the mythological Gargareans, a group who migrated from eastern Asia Minor to the North Caucasus mentioned by Greek writer Strabo, are connected to the Nakh root gergara, meaning "kindred" in proto-Nakh. However, Jaimoukha's theory is unlikely as Strabo and other ancient Greek writers considered the Gargareans to be Greeks.

== List of Nakh peoples ==
=== Contemporary ===
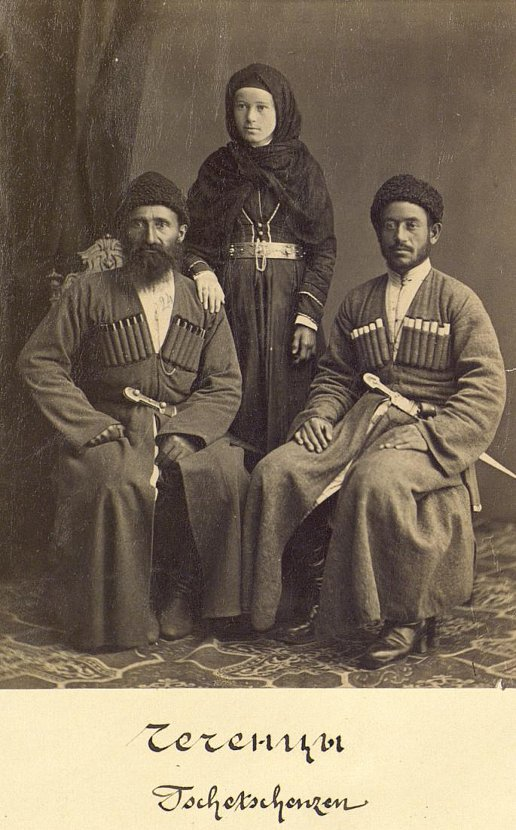
Group portrait of Chechen men and young woman in traditional costumes, 19th century

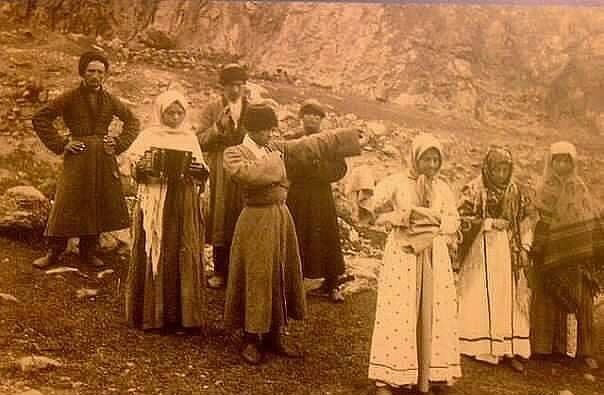
Ingush from the village of Gvileti

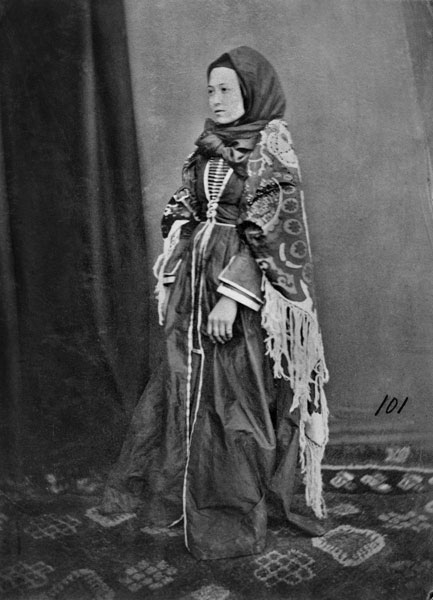
Ingush woman in traditional costume, 1881

- Vainakh (Chechen-Ingush dialect continuum)
  - The Chechen people are a North Caucasian native ethnic group, they refer to themselves as Nokhchiy (pronounced [no̞xtʃʼiː]). Their worldwide population is around 2 million, approximately 75% of which live in the Republic of Chechnya, a subdivision of the Russian Federation. Most Chechens are Sunni Muslims of the Shafi'i school.
    - The Kist people are a Chechen sub-ethnos, belonging to Chechen teips, living in Georgia. They primarily live in the Pankisi Gorge, in the eastern Georgian region of Kakheti, where there are approximately 5,000 Kist people. Majority of Kists are Sunni Muslim, however, there are still remaining small pockets of Christian Kists in Pankisi, Tusheti and Kakheti.
  - The Ingush people are a North Caucasian native ethnic group of the North Caucasus, mostly inhabiting the Russian republic of Ingushetia. The endonym they use for self-designation is Ghalghai. The Ingush people are predominantly Sunni Muslims and speak the Ingush language, which, according to some authors, is mutually intelligible with Chechen, despite popular misconceptions, and they are closely related. Their total population is estimated to be c. 1 million worldwide.
    - The Orstkhoy are a historical ethnoterritorial society (sub-group) among the Chechen and Ingush people. In the tradition of the Chechen ethno-hierarchy, it is considered one of the nine historical Chechen tukkhums, in the Ingush tradition as one of the seven historical Ingush shahars. Many sources refer to them as one of the most militant Vainakh tribe.
- The Bats people or the Batsbi are a small Nakh-speaking community in Georgia who are also known as the Ts'ova-Tush after the Ts’ova Gorge in the historic Georgian province of Tusheti (known to them as "Tsovata"), where they are believed to have settled after migrating from the North Caucasus in the 16th century. Their population is estimated to be ca. 3000. Unlike the other Nakh peoples the Bats people are overwhelmingly Orthodox Christians.

=== Historical ===
The following is a list of historical or prehistoric peoples who have been proposed as speakers of Nakh languages.

Sophene

According to Georgian scholars I. A. Djavashvili and Giorgi Melikishvili the Urartuan state of Supani was occupied by the ancient Nakh tribe Tzov, the state of which is called Tsobena in ancient Georgian historiography. Sophene was part of the kingdom of Urartu from the 8th to 7th centuries BCE. After uniting the region with his kingdom in the early 8th century BCE, king Argishtis I of Urartu resettled many of its inhabitants to his newly built city of Erebuni. However, Djavashvili's and Melikishvili's theory is not widely accepted.

Gargareans

Jaimoukha argued that the Vainakhs are descended from the Gargarei, a mythological tribe who are mentioned in the Geographica of Strabo (1st century BCE) and in Naturalis Historia of Pliny the Elder (1st century CE). Strabo wrote that "... the Amazons live close to Gargarei, on the northern foothills of the Caucasus Mountains". Gaius Plinius Secundus also localizes Gargarei as living north of the Caucasus, but calls them Gegar. Some scholars (P. K. Uslar, K. Miller, N. F. Yakovleff, E. I. Krupnoff, L. A. Elnickiy, I. M. Diakonoff, V. N. Gamrekeli) supported the proposal that Gargarei is an earlier form of the Vainakh ethnonym. Jaimoukha notes that "Gargarean" is one of many Nakh root words – gergara, meaning, in fact, "kindred" in proto-Nakh. If this is the case, it would make Gargarei virtually equivalent to the Georgian term Dzurdzuk (referring to the lake Durdukka in the South Caucasus, where they are thought to have migrated from, as noted by Strabo, before intermixing with the local population) which they applied to a Nakh people who had migrated north across the mountains to settle in modern Chechnya and Ingushetia.

Despite Jaimoukha's claims, Strabo suggests that the Gargareans were Aeolian Greeks and locates their homeland Gargara in Troad, in the far west of modern Turkey.

Tsanars and Tzanaria

The Tsanars were a people of East-Central Northern Georgia, living in an area around modern Khevi. Tsanaria was their state, and it distinguished itself by the decisive role it and its people played in fending off the Arab invasion of Georgia. Their language is thought by many historians (including Vladimir Minorsky and Amjad Jaimoukha) to be Nakh, based on placenames, geographic location, and other such evidence. However, there is opposition to the theory that theirs was a Nakh language. Others claim they spoke a Sarmatian language like Ossetic. The Tsanars, too, eventually were assimilated within Georgiandom.

Ghlighvi

Ghlighvi has been a historical name for the Ingush, deriving from their ethnonym Ghalghaï. It was mentioned by Vakhushti of Kartli in 1745, a Georgian noble.

Dvals and Dvaleti

The Dvals were a historic people living in modern-day South Ossetia and some nearby regions, as well as the southern parts of North Ossetia (South and West of the Gligvs, South and East of the Malkh). They integrated themselves into the Georgian kingdom and produced a number of fine Georgian calligraphers and historians. They also produced an Orthodox saint: Saint Nicholas of Dvaleti. The language of the Dvals is thought to be Nakh by many historians, though there is a rival camp which argues for its status as a close relative of Ossetic. Another theory posits that the Dvals were of Karvelian (Georgian) origin. Various evidence given to support the Nakh theory (Different scholars use different arguments.) includes the presence of Nakh placenames in former Dval territory, taken as evidence of Nakh–Svan contact, which probably would have indicated the Nakh nature of the Dvals or of people there before them, and the presence of a foreign-origin Dval clan among the Chechens. The Dvals were assimilated by the Georgians and the Ossetians. It is thought that Dval did not become fully extinct until the 18th century, making the Dvals the most recent Nakh people known to have disappeared.

Malkhs

The Malkhs were a Nakh people, who were deemed to be the westernmost Nakh people, and made an alliance with the Greek Bosporus Kingdom.

Durdzuks and Durdzuketi

Durdzuk is a medieval ethnonym used mainly in Georgian, Armenian and Arabic sources in the 9th–18th centuries, in which most researchers identify the Durdzuks as the ancestors of modern Chechens and Ingush. Some researchers localize the Durdzuks in the mountainous Ingushetia and identify them with the Ingush, others believe that during the Middle Ages the population of Chechnya was known to the South Caucasian peoples under the name "Durdzuks" (or "Dzurdzuks"), and the population of Ingushetia under the names "Gligvi" The Georgian historian V. N. Gamrekeli claims that "Durdzuk" is definitely and, with all its references, uniformly localized, between Didoet-Dagestan in the east and the gorge of the Terek River, in the west.

The Durdzuks constructed numerous kingdoms, notably Durdzuketi; and they were noted for their exceptionally fierce devotion to freedom and their ability to resist invaders, ranging from the Arabs to the Scythians to Turkic peoples to the Mongolian invaders. They seemed also to have been employed as mercenaries by various parties. They had a written language using Georgian script (It is not known whether they spoke that language however.), but most of these writings have been lost, with only a few pieces surviving. After the 14th-century Second Mongol Invasion of Durdzuketi and the destruction wrought by the two invasions (including, as Amjad Jaimoukha notes, the destruction of their memory of their past), they radically changed their culture.

Isadiks

The Isadiks were an ancient Nakh people of the North Caucasus who were farmers. They were probably undone by Scythian invaders. A remnant of them may have been absorbed by the Vainakh, as their name can now be seen in the Chechen teip Sadoy.

Khamekits

The Khamekits were another ancient Nakh people of the North Caucasus who were farmers. They were also probably undone by Scythian invaders. A remnant of them may have been absorbed by the Vainakh, as their name may now be reflected in the Ingush teip Khamki.

== Ideology ==
Pan-Nakhism refers to a political and cultural movement aimed at the unification, cooperation, and solidarity of the Nakh peoples, primarily the Chechens and Ingush, as well as other related ethnic groups such as the Kists of Georgia. The movement seeks to promote the shared linguistic, cultural, and historical heritage of the Nakh peoples while advocating for their autonomy, preservation of identity, and protection of their rights.

== See also ==
- Deportation of the Chechens and Ingush
- Peoples of the Caucasus
- Northeast Caucasian languages
- Nakh languages
- Y-DNA haplogroups in populations of the Caucasus
- List of Chechen people

== Bibliography ==
- ჯავახიშვილი, ივანე (1937). ქართული ერის ისტორიის შესავალი [Introduction to the history of the Georgian nation] (PDF) (in Georgian). Vol. 2: ქართული და კავკასიური ენების თავდაპირველი ბუნება და ნათესაობა. თბილისი: სსრკ მეცნიერებათა აკადემია – საქართველოს ფილიალი. pp. 1–754.
- Чикобава, А.С. (2010). Введение в иберийско-кавказское языкознание [Introduction to Iberian-Caucasian Linguistics] (in Russian). Тбилиси: Тбилисский Гос. Университет им. И. Джаважишвили. Изд. «Универсал».
- Гюльденштедт, Иоганн Антон (2002). Путешествие по Кавказу в 1770–1773 гг (in Russian). Санкт-Петербург: Петербургское Востоковедение. pp. 1–508.
- Pallas, Peter Simon (1811). Second voyage de Pallas, ou voyages entrepris dans les gouvernemens méridionaux de l'Empire de Russie: pendant les années 1793 et 1794 (in French). Vol. 2. Paris. pp. 1–383.
- Klaproth, Julius Heinreich (1814). Geographisch-historische Beschreibung des östlichen Kaukasus, zwischen den Flüssen Terek, Aragwi, Kur und dem Kaspischen Meere. Pt.2 of Volume 50 (in German).
- Броневский, Семён Михайлович (1823). Новейшие географические и исторические известия о Кавказе: Часть II (in Russian). Москва: Типография С. Селивановского. pp. 1–458.
- Робакидзе, А. И. (1968). Кавказский этнографический сборник. Очерки этнографии Горной Ингушетии (in Russian). Тбилиси: Мецниереба. pp. 1–333.
- Крупнов, Е.И. (1971). Средневековая Ингушетия (in Russian). Москва: Изд. Наука.
- Латышев, В.В. (1947). Известия древних писателей о Скифии и Кавказе // ВЕСТНИК ДРЕВНЕЙ ИСТОРИИ, №4 (in Russian). Москва-Ленинград: Издательство Академии Наук СССР.
- Anchabadze, George (2009). Vainakhs (The Chechen and Ingush). Tbilisi: Caucasian House. pp. 1–76.
- Mayor, Adrienne (2016). The Amazons. Princeton University Press. ISBN 9780691170275.
- Яновский, А. О. (1846). Древней Кавказской Албании. Часть LII. Отд. II (in Russian). Санкт-Петербург: Журнал Министерства народного просвещения.
- Кох, Карл (1842). Путешествие через Россию к Кавказскому перешейку — 1836, 1837, 1838 г. (in Russian).
- Бутков, П. Г. (1869). Материалы для новой истории Кавказа, с 1722 по 1803 год. Часть вторая / Императорская академия наук. Непременный секретарь академик К. Веселовский (in Russian). Санкт-Петербург: Типография Императорской академии наук. pp. 1–602.
- Wahl, O. W. (1875). The Land of the Czar. London: Chapman and Hall. pp. 1–417.
- Бердзенешвили, Н. А.; Дондуа, В. Д.; Думбадзе, М. К.; Меликишвили, Г. А.; Месхиа, Ш. А. (1962). История Грузии: с древнейших времён до 60-х годов XIX века (in Russian). Тбилиси: Издательство учебно-педагогической литературы.
- Джанашвили, М. Г. (1897). Известия грузинских летописей и историков о Северном Кавказе и России (in Russian). Тифлис: Типография К.П. Козловского.
- Волкова, Н. Г. (1973). Этнонимы и племенные названия Северного Кавказа (in Russian). Москва: Наука. pp. 1–211.
- Кушева, Е. Н. (1963). Народы Северного Кавказа и их связи с Россией (вторая половина XVI – 30-е годы XVIII века) (in Russian). Москва: Издательство Академии Наук СССР. pp. 1–373.
- Белокуров, Сергей Алексеевич (1889). Сношения России с Кавказом. Выпуск 1-й. 1578–1613 гг (in Russian). Москва: Университетская типография. pp. 1–715.
- Албогачиева, М. С.-Г. (2017). Ислам в Ингушетии: этнография и историко-культурные аспекты [Islam in Ingushetia: ethnography and historical and cultural aspects] (in Russian). СПб: Российская академия наук; Музей антропологии и этнографии им. Петра Великого (Кунсткамера). pp. 1–264. ISBN 978-5-88431-349-1.
- Anchabadze, George (2001). Vainakhs (The Chechen and Ingush). Tbilisi: Caucasian House. pp. 1–76.
- Павлова, О. С. (2012). Ингушский этнос на современном этапе: черты социально-психологического портрета [The Ingush ethnos at the present stage: features of the socio-psychological portrait] (in Russian). Москва: Форум. pp. 1–384. ISBN 9785911346652. OCLC 798995782.
- Сулейманов, А. С. (1978). Шайхиев, А. Х. (ed.). Часть II: Горная Ингушетия (юго-запад) и Чечня (центр и юго-восток) [Part 2: Mountainous Ingushetia (southwest) and Chechnya (center and southeast)]. Топонимия Чечено-Ингушетии: в IV частях (1976–1985 гг.) (in Russian). Грозный: Чечено-Ингушское Книжное Издательство. pp. 1–233.
