= Adermakhus =

Chief of Mahlia
- Reign: ?–480 BCE
- Died: 480 BCE; Scythia
- Spouse: Mazaeya

Adermakhus, also known as Adirmakh or Adermalkh, was an ancient Caucasian chief of the Mahlians. His only mention is in the work of the ancient Greco-Syrian writer Lucian of Samosta, "Toxaris", also known as Friendship. According to the story, Adermakhus married the daughter of the Bosporan king Leukanor, Mazaeya, which enraged the Scythian ambassador and tax collector Arsakomas, who successfully orders the assassination of Leukanor and the kidnapping of Mazaeya. Following this, Adermakhus gathers an army and invades Scythia, but is later killed in battle by Arsakomas himself. However, the novel by Lucian is fiction and not based on historical records.

== In the source ==
The novel of Lucian of Samosta, Toxaris, (Note: Greek: Τόξαρις, romanized: Toxaris; also known as Friendship Greek: Φιλία, romanized: Filía) starts as a conversation between two friends, the Athenian Mnesippus and the Scythian Toxaris. After the latter tells Mnesippus that the Scythians are masters of practicing friendship while the Greeks have mastered merely describing it through their plays and writings. Following that, both tell each other five stories of true friendship that they have witnessed in their live.

In one of the tales of Toxaris, he talks about the three friends Arsakomas, Makentes and Lonkhates.

Arsakomas, a Scythian ambassador and tax collector, visited the Bosporan king Leukanor to collect the annual tribute which the Bosporan Kingdom owed Scythia. A feast was held, where Leukanor, Arsakomas, but also Adermakhus, chief of Mahlia, Tigrapates, king of the Laz people and many other princes and kings from across the Caucasus met. The feast was held to determine whom the daughter of Leukanor, Mazaeya, would marry. Arsakomas fell in love with the girl, proposed but was rejected due to his lack of wealth, as he was a poor commoner among the Scythians.

"Sire," he said, "give me your daughter Mazaeya to wife: if wealth and possessions count for anything, I am a fitter husband for her than these.' Leucanor was surprised: he knew that Arsacomas was but a poor commoner among the Scythians. "What herds, what waggons have you, Arsacomas?" he asked; "these are the wealth of your people." "Waggons and herds I have none," was Arsacomas's reply: "but I have two excellent friends, whose like you will not find in all Scythia."

The Caucasian nobles at the table made fun of him, thinking he was drunk.

Adermakhus, who also proposed, got accepted and soon after married Mazaeya. Adermakhus was a healthy man, having 10 golden cups, 80 waggons of four seats and a number of sheep and oxen. Angrily, Arsakomas returned to Scythia, told the story to his friends and the three plotted revenge. Lonkhates was supposed to go to the Bosphorus and kill Leukanor, while Makentes would travel to Mahlia and kidnap Mazaeya. Arsakom would stay at home and gather an army in case of enemy invasion.

Lonkhates travelled to the Bosphorus and met with Leukanor, warning him about a large Scythian invasion led by Arsakom. Leukanor invated Lonkhates to his temple in order to discuss further action, but as soon as nobody was near the two, Lonkhates stabbed the king in the chest and then decapitated him. He took his head and returned to Scythia.

Makentes was also successful, he managed to convince Adermakhus to go to the Bosphorus in order to claim his thrown as the next king of the Bosphorus. Adermakhus believed him and went to the Bosphorus, allowing Makentes to kidnap Mazaeya. Adermakhus soon found out about the deceit and returned to Mahlia and prepared for an invasion of Scythia.

Meanwhile, in Scythia, Arsakom managed to gather not much less than 30,000 soldiers, 20,000 of whom were infantry and less than 10,000 cavalry.

Adermakh gathered a large army and invaded Scythia. On his way there, he met a Greek commander by the name Eubiotus, who was at the head of a 20,000 strong Greek, Alan and Sarmatian army. The two joined forces and numbered 90,000 troops, ~30,000 of whom were mounted archers.

When the two sides met, Arsakom ordered his cavalry to go forward, followed by his infantry. The superior army of Adermakhus and Eubiotus turned out successful, and split the Scythian army in to two: One larger and one smaller part. The larger part deserted the battlefield, while the smaller part, including the three friends, were encircled. The effective use of the mounted archers decimated the Scythian army, and many began surrendering. In the front lines, Makentes and Lonkhates were fighting, and both were severely wounded. Seeing this, Arsakom mounted on his horse and rushed at the enemy and singele-handedly pushed them back, saving his friends. Then, he gathered the remaining troops and charged at Adermakhus. Arsakom pulled out his sword, hit Adermakhus in the next, and then split him in two. After the death of the king, his army deserted the battlefield, followed by the Greek army shortly after.
The next day, ambassadors arrived to discuss the peace agreement. In the agreement, the Bosphorus agreed to double the annual tribute, Mahlia promised to release all war captives, and the Alans promised to subjugate the Sindians, a tribe which had revolted against the Scythians.

== Gumba and other sources ==
Guram Gumba, a historian and politician from Abkhazia, included the story of Adermakhus in his work "Settlements of the Vainakh tribes according to Ashkharatsuyts", in which he is presented as the king of the Malkh nation, an ancient Nakh tribe. According to Gumba, he is called Adirmalkh and his name translates to "Owner of the power of the sun" in the Vainakh languages. The name "Adirmalkh" was supposedly a common name for the kings of the Malkh. Gumba states that Adermakh's invasion of Scythia is supposed to portray the strength and influence of the Malkh kingdom in the North Caucasus. Nevertheless, his portrayal of Adermakhus as a historical figure is criticized by historians.

== See also ==
- Malkh — Nakh nation in the Northwest–central Caucasus during ancient times
- Toxaris — Novel by Lucian of Samosta, only mention of Adermakhus
