= Dvals =

Extinct Caucasian ethnolinguistic group

The Dvals (Georgian: დვალები, Dvalebi; Iron Ossetic: Туалтæ, romanized: Twaltæ) were an extinct ethnolinguistic group associated with the historical region of Dvaleti in the central Greater Caucasus. Their historical territory extended across both sides of the central Greater Caucasus, between the Darial Gorge and Mamison Pass. It encompassed areas north of Kartli, parts of the Racha and Khevi regions in present-day Georgia, and territories south of present-day North Ossetia–Alania in Russia.

== Etymology ==
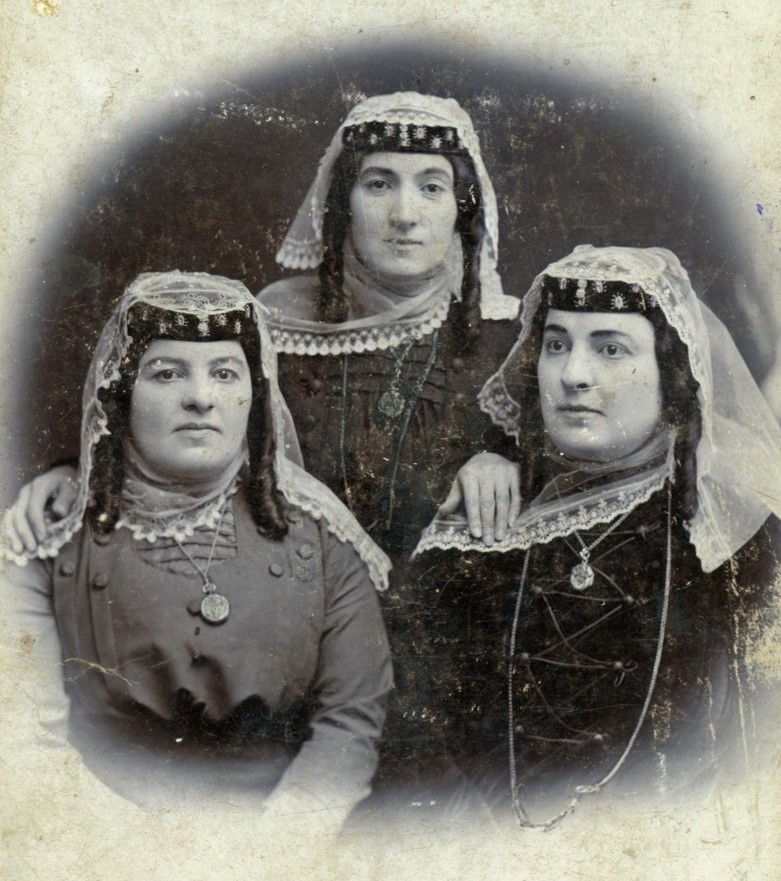
Circa 19th century photo of Dvali family sisters.

The name of the Dvals (Georgian: დვალნი, Dvalni) is found in old Georgian annals. Their land was called Dvaleti (დვალეთი. Dvalet`i) after them.

The ethnonym survived to modern times as "Twal" and "Urs-Twal" (Iron Ossetic: Урстуалтæ meaning "white Twals"). The Georgian surname Dvali (დვალი), Dvalishvili (დვალიშვილი), Dvalidze (დვალიძე) and Ossetian Tuallagov/Twallægtæ also come from the name Dvals.

According to the Swedish linguist G. Skjold, the term Dval comes from the name of the Alanian prince "Dula".

== History ==
When the Mongols destroyed the Alanian kingdom in the Northern Caucasus in the 13th–14th centuries, the Ossetes migrated across the Caucasus mountains. In a part of Dvaletia they formed their community called Tualläg. The Dvals were pushed southward and, as a result, the process of their assimilation into the Georgians and Ossetes accelerated. By the early 18th century it was complete. The term Dvaleti retained only a geographic meaning, narrowed to refer solely to the area around the Kudaro valley in the west (modern-day Java district in South Ossetia/Shida Kartli).

== Genetics ==
Members of the Dvali last name from Georgia belong to G-M201 haplogroup.

== Language and origin ==
There are different theories about the Dvals' origins.

=== Georgian theory ===
Throughout the history of Georgian statehood, even after its inclusion into the Russian Empire, Dvaleti had always been considered an integral part of Kartli.

From the 15th century on Ossetians began to settle in Dvaleti province, located in the northern part of the main Caucasus range. This continued throughout the 16th century, while in the 17th century, assimilation of the local Georgian ethnic group of Dvalians draws to its end. Before the settlement of Ossetians in Dvaleti, a major part of the Dvalians had migrated to different parts of Georgia: Shida Kartli, Kvemo Kartli, Imereti, Racha.

Russia annexed Kartli-Kakheti in 1801 along with Dvaleti. In 1858 Dvaleti was administratively detached from Tiflis Governorate, and attached to the Tersky district of Russia.

Vakhushti Bagrationi pointed out that “the language they speak is old, Dvalian, but presently they use Ossetian as if it were their native tongue”. V. Gamrekeli regarded Dvalians Vainakhs, Kartvelian Vainakhs to be more exact. V. Gamrekeli believed that the Kartization of the Dvalians occurred in the 7th century, when the Kartlian population, fatigued by the Arab rule, had migrated. The author later changed his views, and in an article published in Georgian Soviet Encyclopedia he recognized the Dvalians as Kartvelian tribes, namely Zans. Some scholars point that they were not exactly Zan but represented one the Kartvelian languages. The last of the Georgian authors to address the issue of Dvalian origins was B. Gamkrelidze, who arrived at the conclusion that “Dvaleti, from ancient times, culturally, and administratively had always been an integral part of the Georgian world″.

Another detail to prove their Kartvelian origin is the absence of crypts in Dvaleti. Crypts were encountered only in Chechnya and Ingushetia, while Chechens and Ingush were recognized as skillful builders and used to build the crypts not only in their native lands but in neighbouring Ossetia as well. It is suggested that if the Dvalians had been related to the Vainakhs, the culture of crypt building would have existed among them as well.

=== Nakh theory ===
According to a number of historians and linguists, the Dvals probably spoke a Nakh language. Gamrekeli (a Georgian historian) provides the typical version of the Nakh theory, stating that the Dvals had a language clearly distinct from that of the Ossetes (who eventually migrated onto their land) and akin (but not equivalent to) to the Vainakh languages, but he later changed his view as he saw more arguments backing up the theory of Dvals being Georgian mountaineers

Backing the theory that the Dvals were Nakh are numerous sources.

- The people directly to their West (the Malkh; in the northern part of their territory in Southern North Ossetia-"Alania"; not the South Caucasian part where the Svans bordered them) are already more or less confirmed to be Nakh in origin.
- There is evidence produced by the German Caucasologist, Heinz Fähnrich, of extensive Nakh-Svan contact before the advent of Iranian-speaking invaders. Thus, in order to have extensive contact with the Svans, enough for the strong Nakh influence detected by Fähnrich in Svan, a Nakh people must have lived close to them. However, without the Dvals or at least a people who lived on their territory before them being Nakh, this could not have happened, as the Malkh, the closest people, lived across one of the most difficult parts of the Caucasus, and to this day the modern inhabitants of Malkhia and the Svans have little if any contact with each other. The Georgian historian Melikishvilli argued, using the similarity in name to the old Vainakh clan Dvali, that the Dvals were akin to the Vainakh (i.e. a Nakh people) but distinct and that a remnant of them became absorbed by the Vainakh proper (as was confirmed happened with actually confirmed Nakh peoples, such as the Malkh after they declined).
- Kuznetsov notes the presence of Nakh placenames in South- and North Ossetia: including Tsei, Leah and Leah-hee (Liakhvi).
- Almost all historians agree that the Dvals were not Alans. If they were really Scythians, it would be unlikely that they would have diverged so sharply in such a small area; especially considering that in the Caucasus, many peoples that no longer formed an ethnic unity and already had been separated for a long period were still considered as one.

=== Ossetian theory ===
Another theory is that the Dvals were an Ossetian speaking people. According to this, they were among first Ossetes to settle in the southern Caucasus. Evidence for the Ossetian theory also draws from various elements:

- In 1957 an example of text thought by some to be Dval was found in Dvaleti. It was written with a Syrian-nestorian writing system.

Original text, provided by Turchanikov:

hcawj acgar ama[r]di a jnn mishnq jtkajin ish kwtwn ljkchh khnkn dan aljka ja ctj (m) mhhh at r k jz azj

Translation to english
Modern Ossetic form:

Xwycwy agcar amardi a jyn mysinag y tyxa jyn yz kotton ...

- Modern day Ossetes living in the old territory of the Dvals (who some believe to be partially descended from the Dvals), are called Tuals in the north and Urs-Tuals in the south, and speak the Tual dialect of the Ossetic language.

== Accomplishments ==
The most prominent Dvals were, perhaps, the 11th–13th calligraphers – John, Michael, Stephen, and George – who worked at various Georgian Orthodox monasteries abroad, chiefly in Jerusalem and at the Mount Athos, and created several fine examples of old Georgian manuscripts, e.g. The Months and The Vitae of St Basil (John the Dval, circa 1055), and the so-called Labechini Gospels (George the Dval, 13th century). Another famous Dval calligrapher was Vola Tliag (Iron Ossetic: Vola Tliag meaning "Vola from Tli") who worked over Kapelle of Nuzal.

The Orthodox church venerates also the memory of St Nicholas of Dvaletia, a Dval monk from the Georgian monastery at Jerusalem, who was martyred, on October 19, 1314, at the order of Amir Denghiz for having preached Christianity. He was canonized by the Georgian Orthodox Church.

== See also ==
- Dvaleti
- History of Georgia
