= Vainakh religion =

Pre-Islamic religion of Vainakh people

The Vainakh peoples of the North Caucasus (Chechens and Ingush) were Islamised comparatively late, during the early modern period, and Amjad Jaimoukha (2005) proposes to reconstruct some of the elements of their pre-Islamic religion and mythology, including traces of ancestor worship and funerary cults. The Nakh peoples, like many other peoples of the North Caucasus such as Circassians, practised tree worship, and believed that trees were the abodes of spirits. Vainakh peoples developed many rituals to serve particular kinds of trees. The pear tree held a special place in the faith of Vainakhs.

== Comparative mythology ==
K. Sikhuralidze proposed that the peoples of the Caucasus region shared a single, regional culture in ancient times. Careful study of the Nakh and Kartvelian mythologies reveals many similarities.

Jaimoukha (2005) adduces comparison with the Circassians, but also more generally with the Iron Age mythology of western Indo-European cultures, especially emphasizing parallels to Celtic polytheism, such as the worship of certain trees (including, notably, a pine tree on the winter solstice, supposedly related to the modern Christmas tree, reconstructed calendar festivals such as Halloween and Beltane, veneration of fire, and certain ghost related superstitions).

== Pantheon ==
Jaimoukha (2005) on page 252 gives a list of reconstructed "Vainakh deities".

- Dela (Chechen), Däl (Ingush), or Dala – The supreme god. Equivalent to Greek Zeus, Roman Jupiter, Germanic Wodan and Circassian Theshxwe.
- Deela-Malkh – Sun-god and patron of cattle breeders. Worshipped on the Nakh New Year's Day, and offered metal orbs and candles, as well as animal sacrifices at times.
- Hela – God of darkness.
- Seela or Sela – God of stars, thunder and lightning. Sela is often portrayed in Vainakh myth as an evil and cruel god. His skein (a loose bag made of animal skin) held the "night" (stars, lightning and thunder). He lives on the top of Mount Kazbek with his fiery chariot. It was he who chained Pkharmat to a mountain for stealing fire, and for this reason, on the Wednesday of his month in the old Vainakh calendar, it was forbidden to carry embers or ashes. During the era of Christianization in Chechnya and Ingushetia, he was (like the Ossetian Watsilla and the Russian Ilya-Muromyets) identified with the prophet Elijah, thus keeping his status. He is also, like the Greek Zeus, unable to control his desires for human women (much to the dismay of his wife, Furki), and one episode with a mortal maiden resulted in the birth of a daughter goddess, Sela Sata.
- Sata or Sela Sata – either wife or daughter of Seela, according to different versions; a goddess of artisanship and especially female crafts, corresponding to Northwest Caucasian Satanaya. Her face is described as shining like the sun with beauty. She helps Pkharmat steal Sela's fire for the Earth's inhabitants by guiding him to the peak of Mount Kazbek.
- Maetsill – God of agriculture and the harvest and protector of the weak.
- Ishtar-Deela – Lord of life and death and ruler of the underworld ("Deeli-Malkhi"), responsible for punishing the wicked.
- Molyz-Yerdi – The war god who brought the Vainakh victory.
- Elta – God of the hunt and animals and - before Maetsill took over his role - the harvest. He was blinded in one eye for disobedience by his father, Deela.
- Amgali(-Yerdi) – A minor deity.
- Taamash(-Yerdi) – ("lord of wonder") Lord of fate. Usually tiny in size but becomes gigantic when angered.
- Tusholi – Goddess of fertility, A greater protector of the people even than her father, Deela. She is believed to dwell in the sacred Lake Galain-Am. According to scholars, in earlier beliefs Tusholi was the dominant deity. People petitioned her for healthy offspring, rich harvests and thriving herds of cattle. In later times Tusholi was mainly the object of worship of childless women. She had a holy day, Tusholi's Day, on which women would bring offerings of the horns of red deer, bullets and candles to her sanctuary on Mount Deela T'e (which non-priests could enter only with the explicit permission of the priesthood and within which it was forbidden to fell her trees). Nowadays her day is considered "Children and Women's day." The hoopoe, known as "Tusholi's hen" was considered "her" bird and could not be hunted except with permission from the high priest and for strictly medicinal purposes.
- Dartsa-Naana ("Blizzard mother") – Goddess of blizzards and avalanches. She dwells on the snowy summit of Mount Kazbek around which she has traced a magic circle, which no mortal of any sense dare cross. Should any be foolhardy enough to do so, Dartsa-Naana will cast them into the abyss and bring tumbling down upon them the death-dealing snows of her mountain home.
- Mokh-Naana – Goddess of the winds.
- Seelasat – ("Oriole") Protectress of virgins (possibly identical to Sata / Sela Sata, see above).
- Meler Yerdi – God of plants and cereal beverages.
- Aira – Patron of eternal timeline.
- Mozh – Evil sister of the sun and moon. Mozh devoured all their other relatives in the sky, and now constantly chases her celestial siblings. Eclipses occur on the rare occasions when she catches up with them and takes them prisoner. Mozh will consent to release the sun and the moon only after it has been so requested by an innocent first-born girl.
- Bolam-Deela – Not much is known about him/her. He/she may or may not have been equivalent to Deela-Malkh.
- Khagya-Yerdi or Maetskhali – Lord of the rocks.
- Mattir-Deela – Another little known deity.
- P'eerska – (Friday) The keeper of time.

== Supernatural creatures and heroes ==
- Pkharmat (Ingush: Kurqo), demi-god Nart who stole fire from the cruel god Sela. Equivalent of Greek Prometheus, and Georgian Amirani. He is also equivalent to the Circassian Pataraz.
- Pkhagalberi tribe. Mythological dwarf race, Pkhagalberi translated as "Hare-riders". They were invulnerable to any kind of weapons their enemies the Narts had.
- Turpal, a free-roaming horse who came to help Pkharmat in his journey when he called him. "Turpal always roamed free, grazing among seven mountains, and drinking sea-water."
- Uja. A cyclops, faithful servant of Sela. He chained Pkharmat to the summit of Mount Kazbek.
- Ida. King of birds, – a falcon who comes every morning to tear Pkharmat's liver.
- Spirit of Galain-Am Lake, a mythologic bull protecting sacred Galain-Am Lake from pollution and from unfaithful acts.
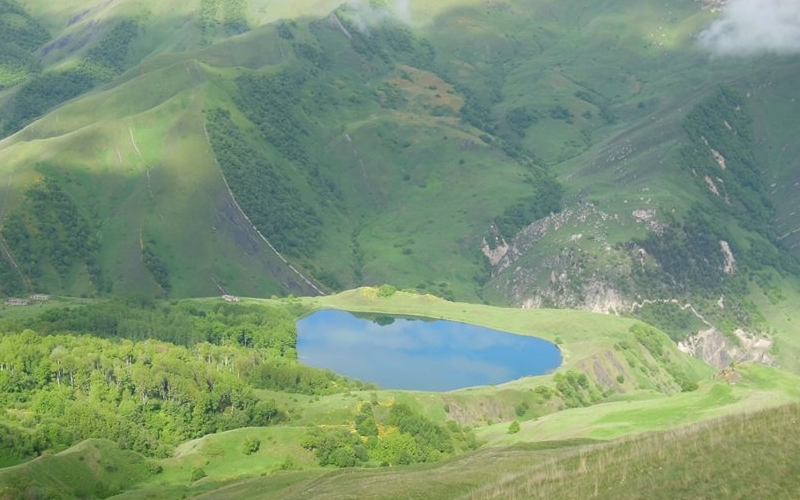
  The sacred lake of Galain-Am
- Melhun, the fallen angel.
- Nart, a mythical race of giants. Separately from the mythology of other peoples of the Caucasus, in Waynakh mythology Narts could be both good and evil.
- Almas, evil forest spirits. They can be both male and female almases. Almas-men covered with hair, a terrible kind, fierce and insidious; on the chest of them is a sharp axe. Female almases have an extraordinary beauty, but also evil, insidious and dangerous. Sometimes they seem terrifying creatures of enormous growth with huge breasts, thrown over his shoulders behind his back. Favorite theirs occupation - dance: throwing his chest behind his back, raising his hands up, they dance in the moonlight. Almases live in the woods, on the highlands. They are patronized by wild animals and sometimes come with a hunter in a love affair. Luck on hunting, according to legends, depends on the benevolence of an almas.
- Ghamsilg (or Gham-stag) was a witch who could leave her body and enter into an animal. If in her absence to turn the body, then, on his return from travels, it will not be able to return to his body and dies.
- Djinim (Jinn). In perceptions of Chechens and Ingush good and evil spirits are between angels and devils. Good and evil djinim together are in the same hostility as angels with devils. Through deceit or eavesdropping, they steal the innermost secrets of the future of man and tell their friends of the earth. Falling star - a star angels cast during eavesdropping. Contact with a djinim leads to insanity.
- Taram, invisible guardian spirits that protect his master from all sorts of disasters. On representations of the Nakhs, every person, every household (family), all natural objects had a Taram.
- Uburs, the evil, bloodthirsty spirits, entered into any animal. Close to the vampire in Slavic mythology (cf. Polish: upiór, Ukrainian: upir).
- Hunsag (or Hunstag), the patron spirit of the forest and forest animals. Hunsag seeks to destroy every hunter who encounters him in the woods, using the bone axe which protrudes from his chest. The forest animals, birds, trees, grass rise to defend Hunsag.
- Batiga-Shertko, a shamanic figure with the ability to cross over into the underworld in order to ascertain how the deceased loved ones of his clients are faring in the afterlife - often with an animal sacrifice as payment. The spirit of the animal offered was then believed to come into the possession of the dead kinsman or kinswoman.

== See also ==
- Nart saga
- Circassian paganism
- Ossetian mythology
- Germanic mythology
- Caucasian neopaganism
- Celtic mythology

== Sources ==
- Amjad Jaimoukha The Chechens: a Handbook (Routledge/Curzon, 2005) pp. 109–111 and appendix pp. 252–253
