= Malkh =

Ancient nation in the Caucasus

The Malkhi (Ancient Greek: Μαχλυη) (Note: Also known as Malkhi, Makhliyans, Makhals, Malkh, while their country was known as Makhelonia or Malkhiya/Makhliya.) were an ancient nation, living in the Western/Central North Caucasus, mentioned in classical sources, primarily by ancient Greco-Syrian writer Lucian and ancient Roman writer Claudius Aelianus.

== Mention in the source ==
Malkhi are mentioned by ancient Greco-Syrian writer Lucian and ancient Roman writer Claudius Aelianus. Despite Lucian's work having a literary and narrative nature, it shows what image the people living in Bosporan Kingdom had about the military-political union of the ancient Chechen, which they knew as "Malkhi". As per the tradition, Malkh acted as one of the large state formations of Southeast Europe in the second half of the 1st millennium BC, having connections with Bosporus, as well as competing with it and with the Scythians, the Colchis.

== Identity ==
Some historians consider them as Maeotian, while others consider them equivalent to the Durdzuks, an ethnonym mentioned primarily in Georgian sources. Some historians consider that the ethnonym was used to designate Nakh peoples.

== See also ==
- Toxaris — Work of Lucian of Samosta mentioned the "Mahlians"
- Adermakhus — King of the Mahlians according to Gumba

== Bibliography ==
- Ахмадов, Я. З.; Гумба, Г. Д.; Курумов, Д. С.; Хасмагомедов, Э. Х. (2019). Ахмадов, Я. З. (ed.). История нахов Передней Азии, Кавказа и Чечни с древнейших времен до конца XV века [The history of the Nakhs of Western Asia, the Caucasus and Chechnya from ancient times to the end of the 15th century] (PDF) (in Russian). М.: Литера. pp. 1–686.
- Гумба, Г. Д. (1988). Расселение вайнахских племен по "Аш-харацуйцу" ("Армянская география" VII в.) [Settlement of the Vainakh tribes according to "Ash-kharatsuytsu" ("Armenian Geography" of the 7th century)] (in Russian). Ереван: Ереванский государственный университет. pp. 1–167.
- Гумба, Г. Д. (1990). "Об одном обще-нахском этнониме второй половины первого тыс. до н.э." [About one common Nakh ethnonym of the second half of the first millennium BC.]. Актуальные проблемы истории дореволюционной Чечено-Ингушетии [Actual problems of the history of pre-revolutionary Checheno-Ingushetia] (in Russian). Грозный.
- Долгиева, М. Б.; Картоев, М. М.; Кодзоев, Н. Д.; Матиев, Т. Х. (2013). История Ингушетии [History of Ingushetia] (4th ed.). Ростов-на-Дону: Южный издательский дом. pp. 1–600. ISBN 978-5-98864-056-1.
- Латышевъ, В. В. (1890). Извѣстія древнихъ писателей о Скиѳіи и Кавказѣ (in Russian). Vol. 1: Греческіе писатели. Санктпетербургъ: Типографія Императорской Академіи Наукъ. pp. 1–946.
- Лукиан (1987). Аверинцев, С.; Апта, С.; Гаспарова, М.; Тахо-Годи, А.; Шервинский, С.; Ярхо, В. (eds.). Избранное [Favorite]. Библиотека античной литературы (in Russian). Translated by Нахова, И. Москва: «Художественная литература». pp. 1–622.
- Лукиан (1996). Избранное [Favorite]. Сокровища мировой литературы (in Russian). Москва: Терра. pp. 1–536. ISBN 5-300-00503-7.
- Ростовцев, М. И. (1925-02-26). Фармаковский, Б. В. (ed.). Скифия и Боспор: Критическое обозрение памятников литературных и археологических [Scythia and the Bosporus: A Critical Review of Literary and Archaeological Monuments] (in Russian). Ленинград: Тип. 1-й Лен. труд. арт. печати. pp. 1–621.
