= Tusholi =

Tusholi (Тушоли) is a goddess of Spring and fertility in Ingush and Chechen mythologies and the daughter of the supreme god Dyala/Däl.

She was the best-loved goddess of the Vainakh people before their adoption of Islam, revered as the patroness of her people, and believed to intercede on their behalf with her father, the more aloof Dyala. The ancient Ingush and Chechen people prayed to her for healthy offspring, abundant crops, and the fertility of their livestock.

Tusholi was the only deity of the Vainakh pantheon who was depicted regularly in an icon - usually a wooden or silver belt ornament depicting a woman with a tear on her cheek. Tusholi is also often depicted on the building stones of Chechen and Ingush towers.

In the Ingush calendar the month of April was named in her honour. The goddess was also worshipped by childless women. Ingushetians and Chechens celebrated the Spring Festival of Tusholi at the time of the annual return migration of hoopoe from warmer climes (the hoopoe, known as Tusholi-kotam (= Tusholi's hen) was believed to be the companion of the goddess and considered highly sacred).

In 2010, the Spring Festival of Tusholi was celebrated for the first time in Ingushetia since the adoption of Islam by the Ingushetians.
