= Dvali =

Dvali (Georgian: დვალი) is a Georgian surname. Notable people with the surname include:

- Giorgi Dvali (born 1964), Georgian professor of physics and a director at the Max Planck Institute for Physics
- Jaba Dvali (born 1985), Georgian football player for Dacia Chișinău
- Lasha Dvali (born 1995), Georgian football player for Śląsk Wrocław
