= Galain-Chazh =

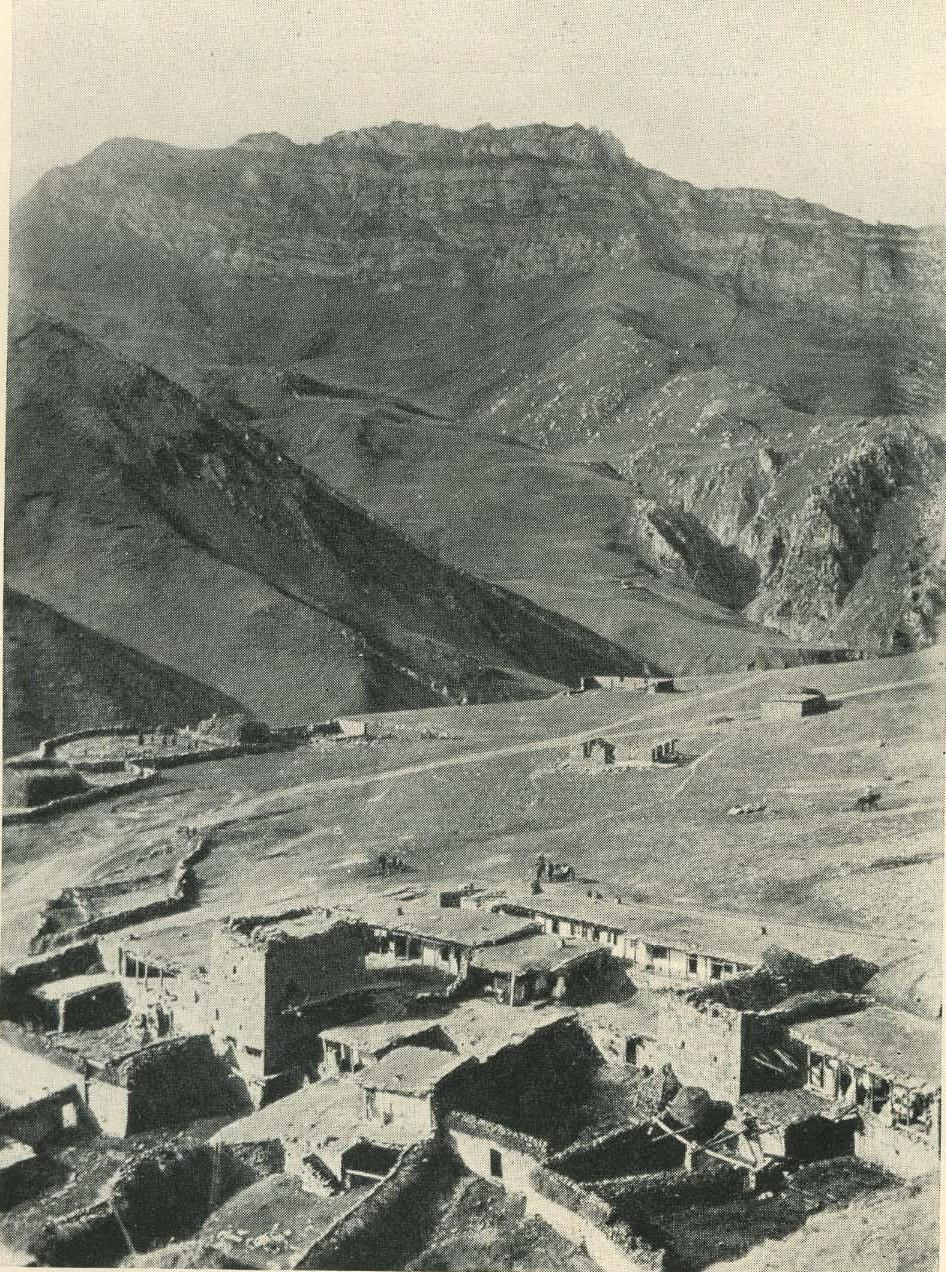
- Interactive map of Galain-Chazh
- Location of Galain-Chazh
- Coordinates: 42°53′00″N 45°18′00″E
- Country: Russia
- Elevation: 1,500 m (4,900 ft)

Map of historical area Galain-Chazh

Galain-Chazh (Chechen: Галайн-ЧӀаж, lit. 'Gorge of Galais') is a historical region in the North Caucasus. Today, Galain-Chazh is a part of Galanchozhsky District, Chechnya.

Since the Middle Ages, Galain-Chazh has been known as the historical center and birthplace of the Galai, a clan (teip) of the Orstkhoy society. In 1944, the entire population was deported to Kazakhstan. Since then, there has been no permanent population in the region.

== Name ==
The name Galain-Chazh roughly translates to English as "gorge of Galai". The name originated from the Galai clan, who settled in the gorge.

== Geography ==
Galain-Chazh is located in the center of Galanchozhsky District. The territory includes Galain-Am (Lake Galanchozh), which is also named after the Galai clan.

Galain-Chazh borders with Yalkharoy-Mokhk in the north, Akka in the west, Khaykharoy in north west, Nashkha in the east, and Terloy-Mokhk in the south.

== Auls ==
Galain-Chazh includes the following villages:

- Aka-Bass,
- Ame,
- Amka,
- Chusha,
- Ei-Salashka,
- Iga-Yurt,
- Kerbeta,
- Kerbicha,
- Korga,
- Ochakh,
- Terkhie.
