= Dvaleti =

- Historical region
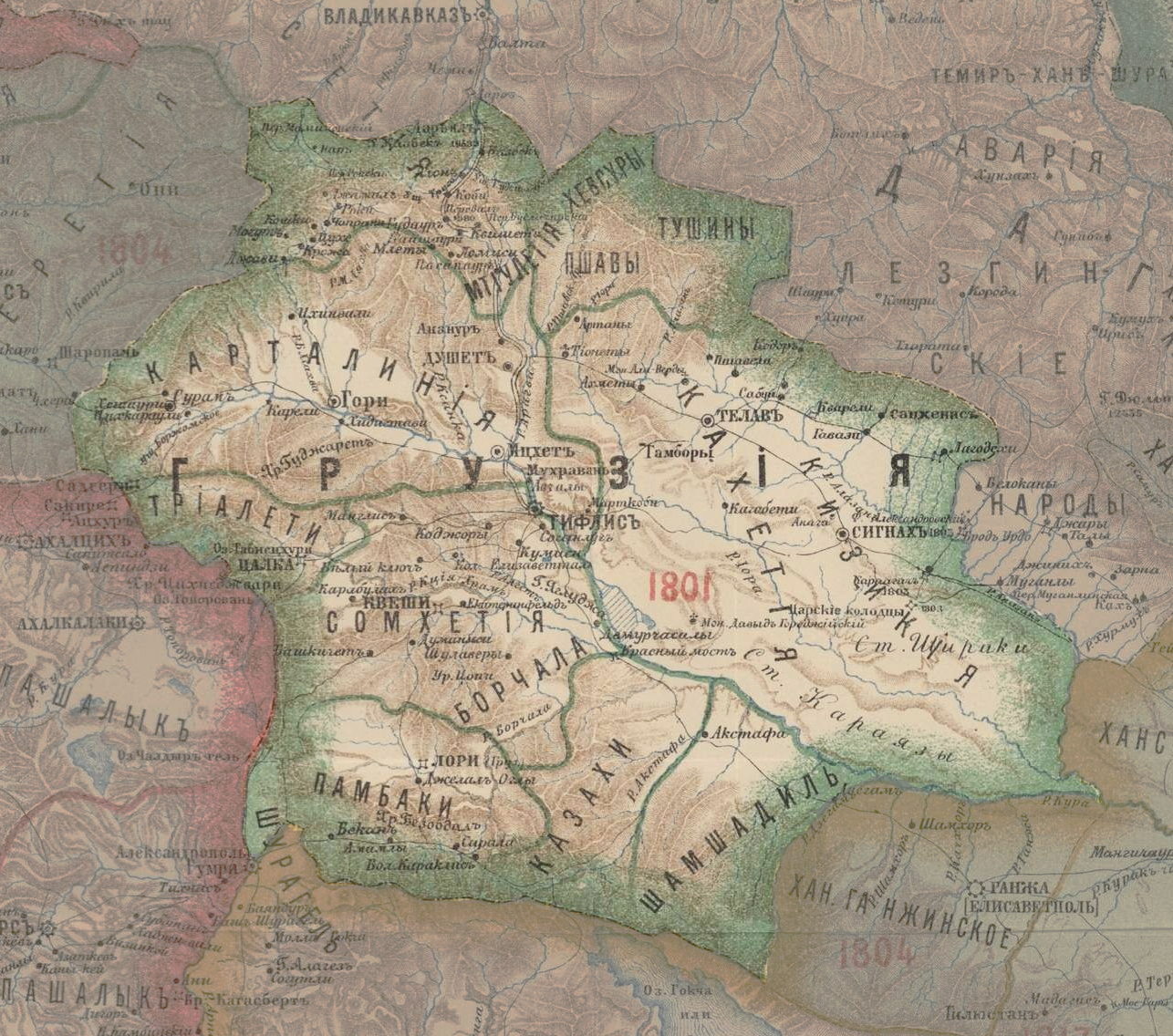
- The Kingdom of Kartli-Kakheti on the Map of the Caucasus, showing the borders in which Dvaleti is included as part of Kartli-Kakheti

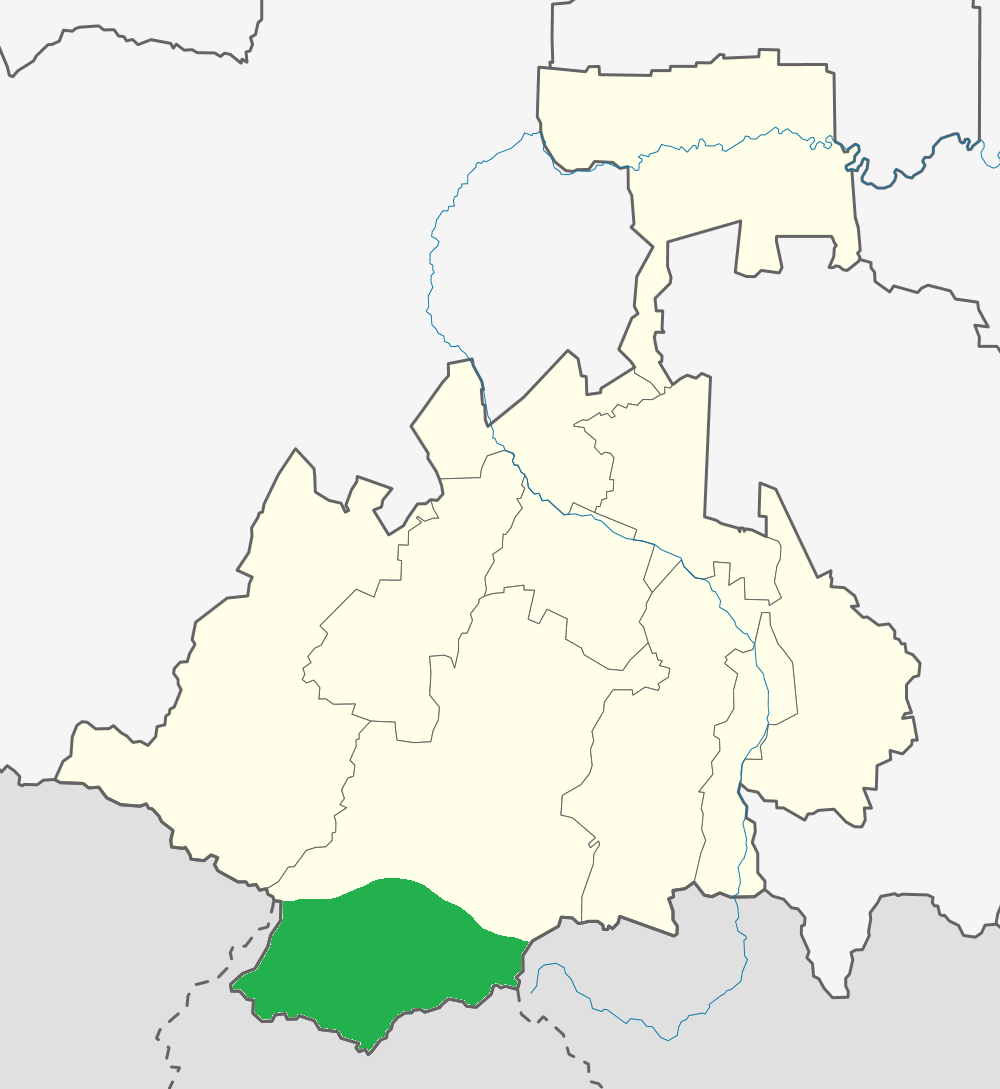
- Map highlighting the historical region of Dvaleti in the borders of modern North Ossetia–Alania.

- Location within North Ossetia–Alania Location within Georgia
- Coordinates: 42°40′N 44°00′E
- Country: Georgia; Russia

Dvaleti (Georgian: დვალეთი; also Tvaleti — თვალეთი; Iron Ossetic: Туалгом — Twalgom) was a historical and ethnographic region in medieval Georgia. Territory in the central part of the Greater Caucasus Mountains, between Mamison Pass and Darial Gorge was associated with Dvaleti. According to Prince Vakhushti of Kartli territory of Dvaleti included several gorges, namely: Kasris-Kkhevi, Zramaga, Zhghele, Nara Gorge, Zrogo, and Zakha. Some authors also mentioned Trusso Gorge and Magrandvaleti as being part of Dvaleti, while others disagree. Dvaleti was integral part of the Georgian Kingdoms from the 4th to 3rd century BC onward. After the Russian annexation of the Kingdom of Kartli-Kakheti, in 1859 Dvaleti was excluded from the Tiflis Governorate and incorporated into the Terek Oblast. On modern maps historical region Dvaleti can be found in the south of North Ossetia–Alania, Russian Federation.

== History ==
Christianity spread in Dvaleti from the middle of the 6th century. Later Dvaleti was included in the Episcopal Diocese of Nikozi. Roads from the Transcaucasia to the North Caucasus passed through Dvaleti. In the Middle Ages, the "Road to Dvaleti" was known. The fortification of the Dvaleti valleys from the north was of great importance for Georgia Kingdoms. After the Mongol invasions in 13th century Dvaleti was inhabited by Ossetian refugees from the north. The indigenous population of Dvaleti (Dvalebi), in turn, moved en masse to the south of the Caucasus. Even after the collapse of the unified Kingdom of Georgia in 15th century, Dvaleti was part of the Kingdom of Kartli. At the beginning of the 17th century Dvaleti was ruled by Giorgi Saakadze. Famous Dvali figures include 11th century clergymen: Michael Dvali, John Dvali and Svimon Dvali. In 1711, Vakhtang VI launched an armed expedition against the Ossetians in Dvaleti. He destroyed 80 towers and forced the Ossetians of Dvaleti to submit to Kingdom of Kartli. According to Johann Anton Güldenstädt In 18 century Dvaletia was an Ossetian province in the upper reaches of the Ardon River.

Historical monuments of Dvaleti that survived till modern times include forts built at the headwaters of the rivers Ardon and Fiagdon — Kasris-karma and Khilka. The ruins of Christian temples in the valleys of Zrogo and Mamison (Zhghele)

== See also ==
- Dvals
- South Ossetia
- Shida Kartli
