= Umalat Laudaev =

First Chechen ethnographer

- Fictional depiction of Laudaev on the front page of his work The Chechen Tribe, republished by M. Kh. Aduev in Grozny in 1994.
- Born: c. 1827; Nogai-Mirza-Yurt, Chechnya
- Died: 1890s
- Scientific career
- Fields: Ethnography and local history
- Military career
- Allegiance: Russian Empire
- Branch: Imperial Russian Army
- Service years: 1830s – 1862
- Rank: Rittmaster

Umalat Laudaev (Russian: Умалат Лаудаев, IPA: [ʊməɫət ɫəʊdə(j)ɪf]; (Note: Pre-reform orthography: Умалатъ Лаудаевъ.) c. 1827 — 1890s) was the first Chechen ethnographer and a Russian officer known for his only work The Chechen Tribe, published in the Collection of information about the Caucasian highlanders in 1872.

== Biography ==
Little is known about Laudaev's life. From his personal appeal to the Russian administration, it is known that his great-grandfather was Nogai-Mirza who emigrated from Ichkeria to the Terek River where he founded an eponymous village with the Russian authorities' allowance. Both Laudaev's father and grandfather lived in the village of Nogai-Mirza-Yurt throughout their lives. Here, Laudaev was born too. From the 1886 census conducted in the village, Laudaev's age is indicated as 69 which historian Nikolai Gritsenko sees as a typo that should be read as 59. This coupled with Laudaev's other biographical information makes Gritsenko assume that Laudaev was born in 1827.

According to the folklore, Laudaev received his education at a Terek Cossacks' school. At the age of 12, Laudaev was sent by his family to study at the Second St. Petersburg Cadet Corps. After graduating from there, he was sent to serve in the Caucasus in the 1830s. In 1862 Laudaev was already a rittmaster. After his retirement, he settled in his native village, Nogai-Mirza-Yurt.

== Publications ==
Laudaev has only one work titled The Chechen Tribe, published in the Collection of information about the Caucasian highlanders in 1872. The work was an attempt to give an idea of the past and present of Chechnya and Ingushetia. Based mainly on personal observations, as well as on folklore, linguistic and historical evidence, Laudaev mentioned daily information about the origins and settlement of the Chechen and Ingush tribes and the social system and culture of their people.

One must critically approach Laudaev's work as it contains a lot of anti-national simplification; in addition, the author was under the influence of official Russian historiography. Chakh Akhriev's works that contained newly recorded legends about the emergence of Ingush societies and the founding of some auls, along with materials collected by Adolf Berge and Laudaev about the Chechens, served as the only primary sources in the absence of others that the first Soviet authors incorrectly used to judge about the history of the formation of the Chechens and Ingush. This usage of the legends was problematic as no single picture emerged due to each community and teip having its own traditions that were not related to each other. The typical features of the legends were that: firstly, the Chechens and Ingush in the Middle Ages came to their modern lands from somewhere else, and secondly, that the ancestors of individual teips came from very different regions (e.g. Georgia, Syria, Persia).

== Sources ==
- Gritsenko, Nikolai (1966). "Умалат Лаудаев — первый чеченский этнограф и историк" [Umalat Laudaev - the first Chechen ethnographer and historian]. Археолого-этнографический сборник [Archaeological and ethnographic collection]. Известия ЧИНИИИЯЛ при СМ ЧИАССР [News of ChIRIHLL under the Council of Ministers of the ChIASSR] (in Russian). VII (1). Grozny: ChIKI: 103–110.
- Shnirelman, V. A. (2006). Kalinin, I. (ed.). Быть Аланами: Интеллектуалы и политика на Северном Кавказе в XX веке [To be Alans: Intellectuals and Politics in the North Caucasus in the 20th Century] (in Russian). Moskva: Novoe literaturnoe obozrenie. pp. 1–348. ISBN 5-86793-406-3. ISSN 1813-6583.
- Smirnov, I. A.; Bokov, Kh. Kh.; Vinogradov, V. B.; Goygova, Z. A.-G.; Gritsenko, V. N.; Krupnov, E. I.; Salamov, A. A.; Samarzin, V. S.; Topakalyan, N. A.; Chentieva, M. L., eds. (1967). Очерки истории Чечено-Ингушской АССР [Essays on the history of the Chechen-Ingush ASSR] (in Russian). Vol. 1. Grozny: ChIKI.
