= Dvalishvili =

Dvalishvili (Georgian: დვალიშვილი) is a Georgian surname. Notable people with the surname include:

- Nadezhda Khnykina-Dvalishvili (born 1933), Soviet track and field athlete
- Merab Dvalishvili (born 1991), Georgian mixed martial artist
- Nelli Dvalishvili (born 1968), Georgian figure skater
- Vladimir Dvalishvili (born 1986), Georgian football player
