= Toxaris =

"Toxaris or Friendship"
- Short story by Lucian of Samosata

Text available at Greek Wikisource
- Original title: Τόξαρις ἢ Φιλία
- Country: Ancient Greece
- Language: Ancient Greek
- Genre(s): dialogue

Publication
- Publication date: 163 AD

Toxaris or Friendship (Greek: Τόξαρις ἢ Φιλία) is a dialogue-style work by the Ancient Syrian novelist Lucian. The text is thought to have been written around 163 AD in Asia. The text is set up as a dialogue between an Athenian, Mnesippus, and a Scythian friend, Toxaris.

== Plot ==
The conversation takes place somewhere in Greece, but the location is unknown. Their discussion begins with Mnesippus questioning the Scythians' devotion to Orestes and Pylades, in whose honor the Scythians had constructed a temple. Mnesippus asks why the Scythians would ever honor two men who had attacked their city, stolen Iphigenia who was priestess of their temple to Artemis, and finally the statue of Artemis itself from the Scythian city of Tauris.

Toxaris tells Mnesippus that the Scythians venerate Orestes and his companion Pylades because of their devotion to friendship. He claims that Scythians are masters of practicing friendship while the Greeks have mastered merely describing it through their plays and writings. They decide to test the validity of his statement which Mnesippus claims is false. What follows is a contest of tales where Mnesippus and Toxaris determine whether Toxaris is correct. They both swear an oath to tell only true tales and decide on each telling five stories of true friendship that they have witnessed during their own lifetimes.

== See also ==
- Scythians
- Blood brother
- List of works by Lucian
